= Abeokuta =

Capital city of Ogun State, Nigeria

Abeokuta Abẹ́òkúta (Yoruba)
- City
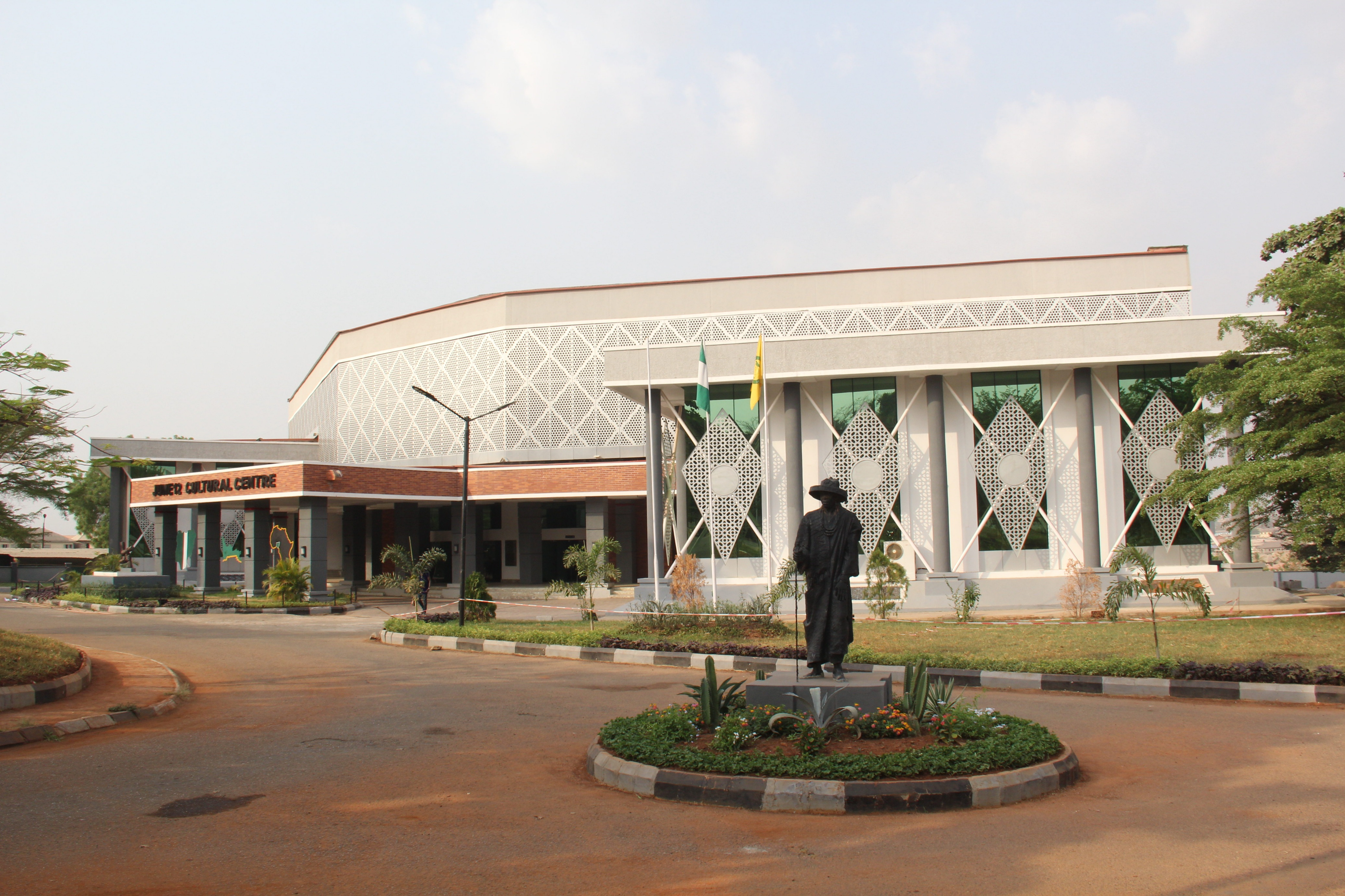
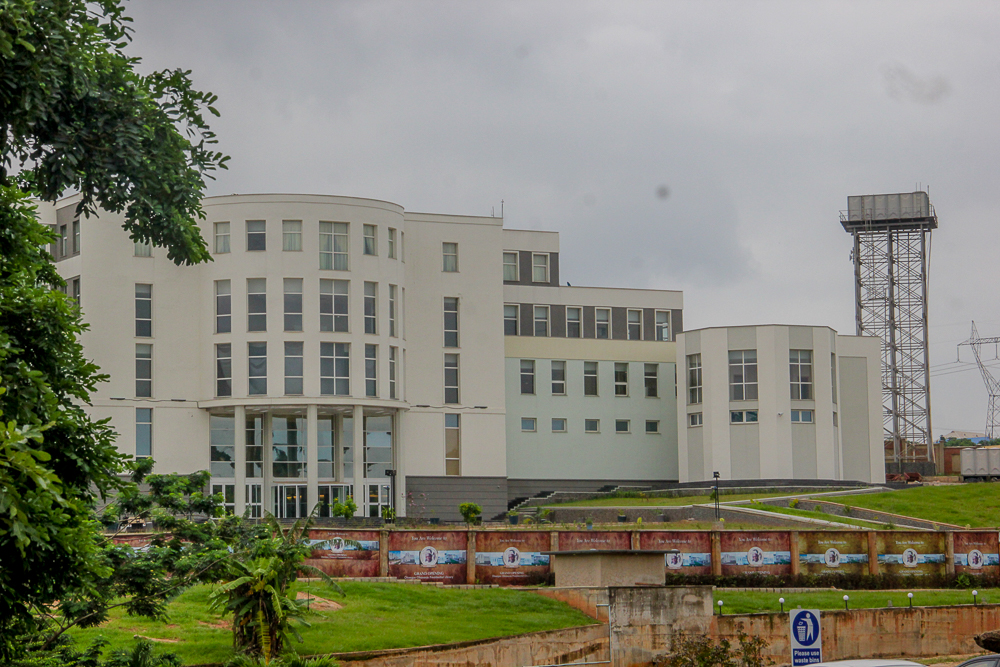
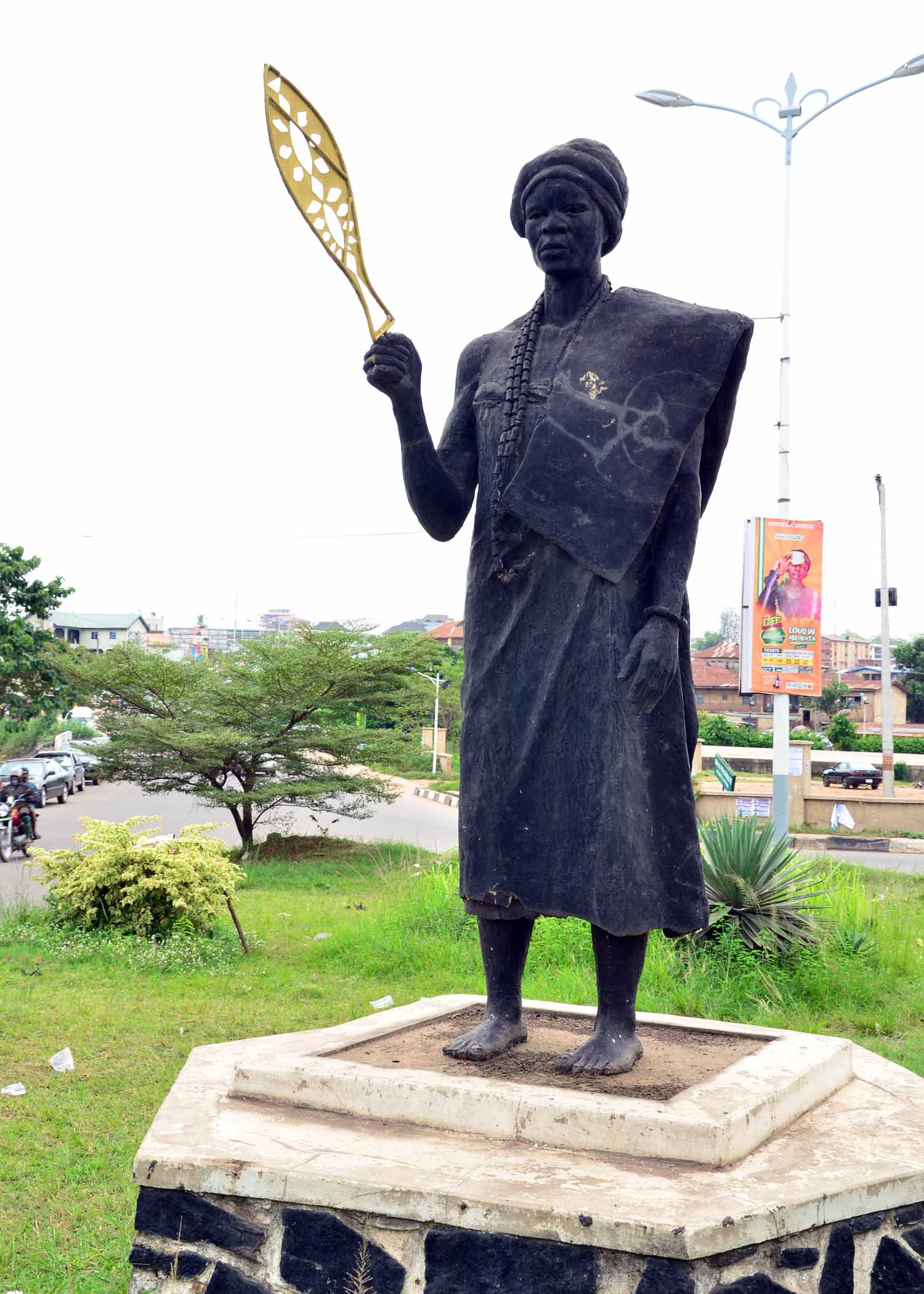
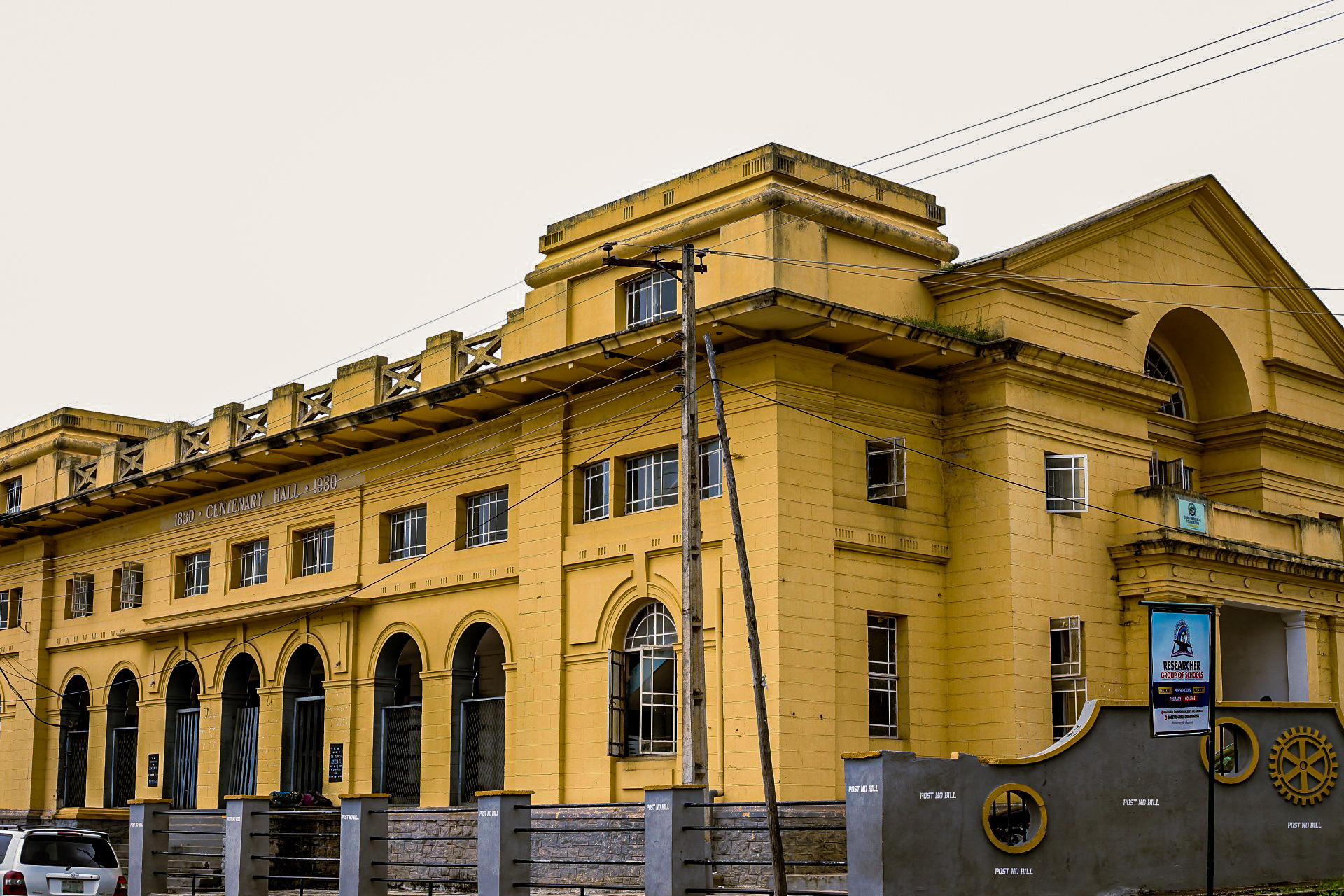
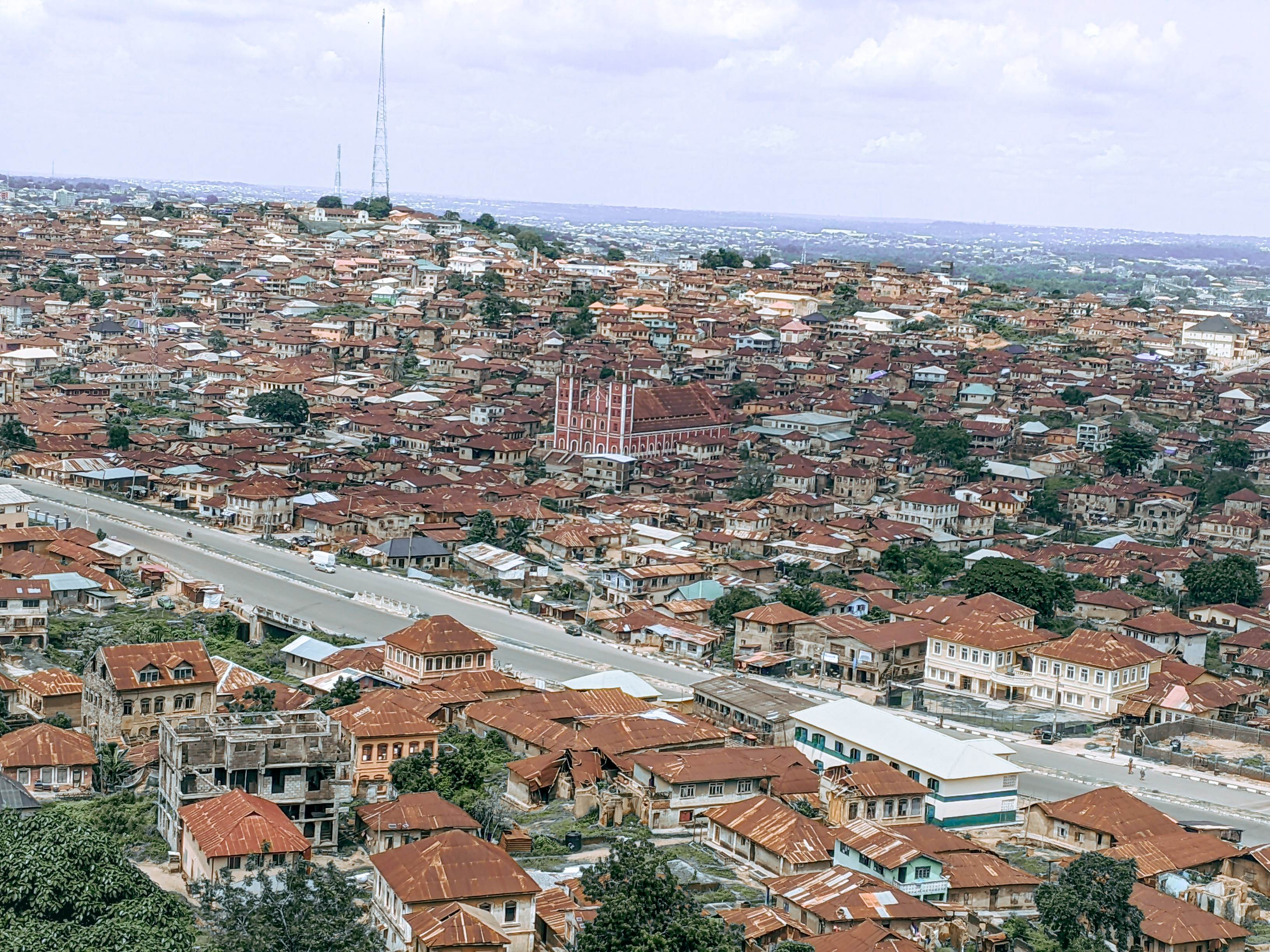
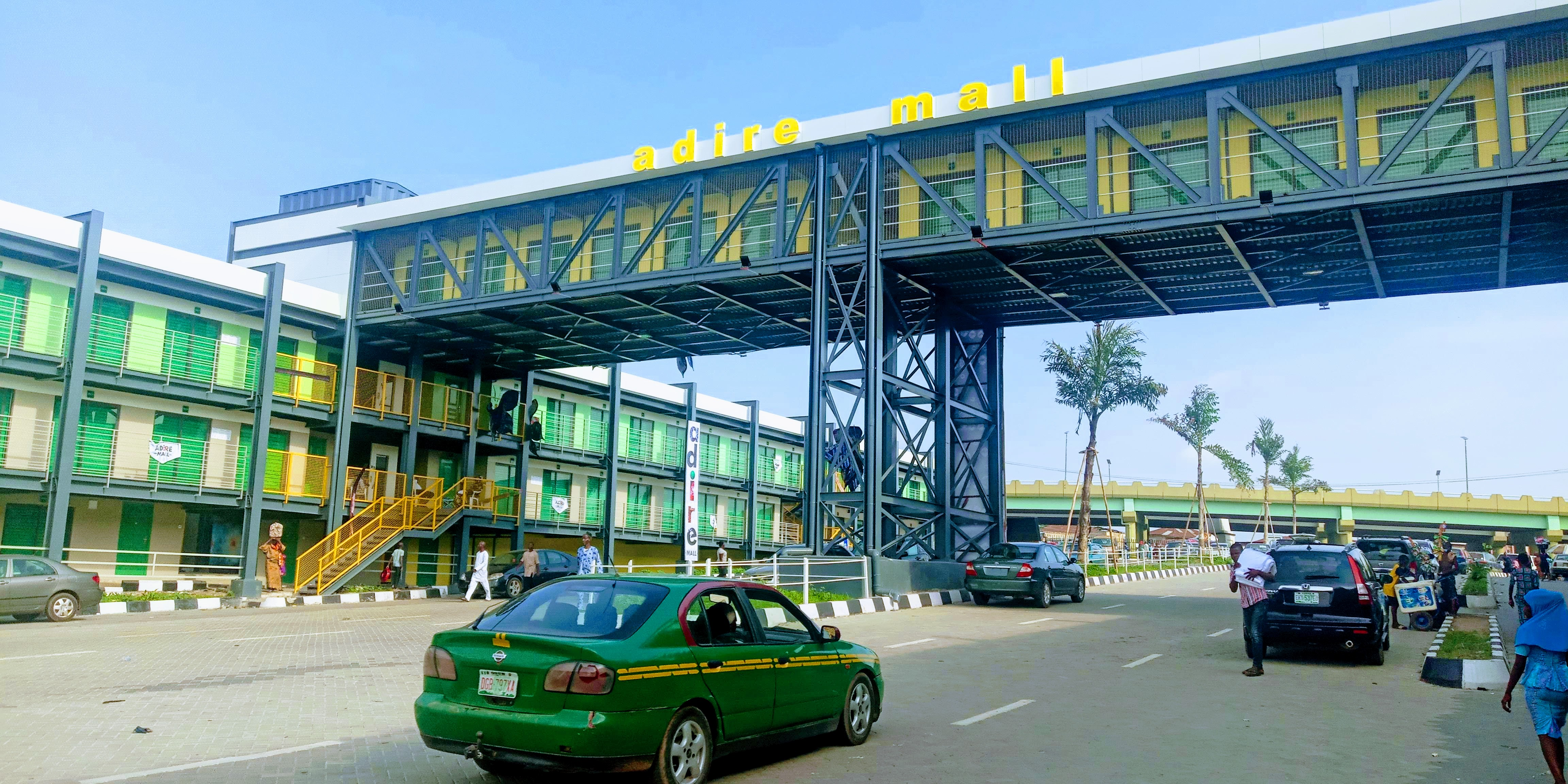
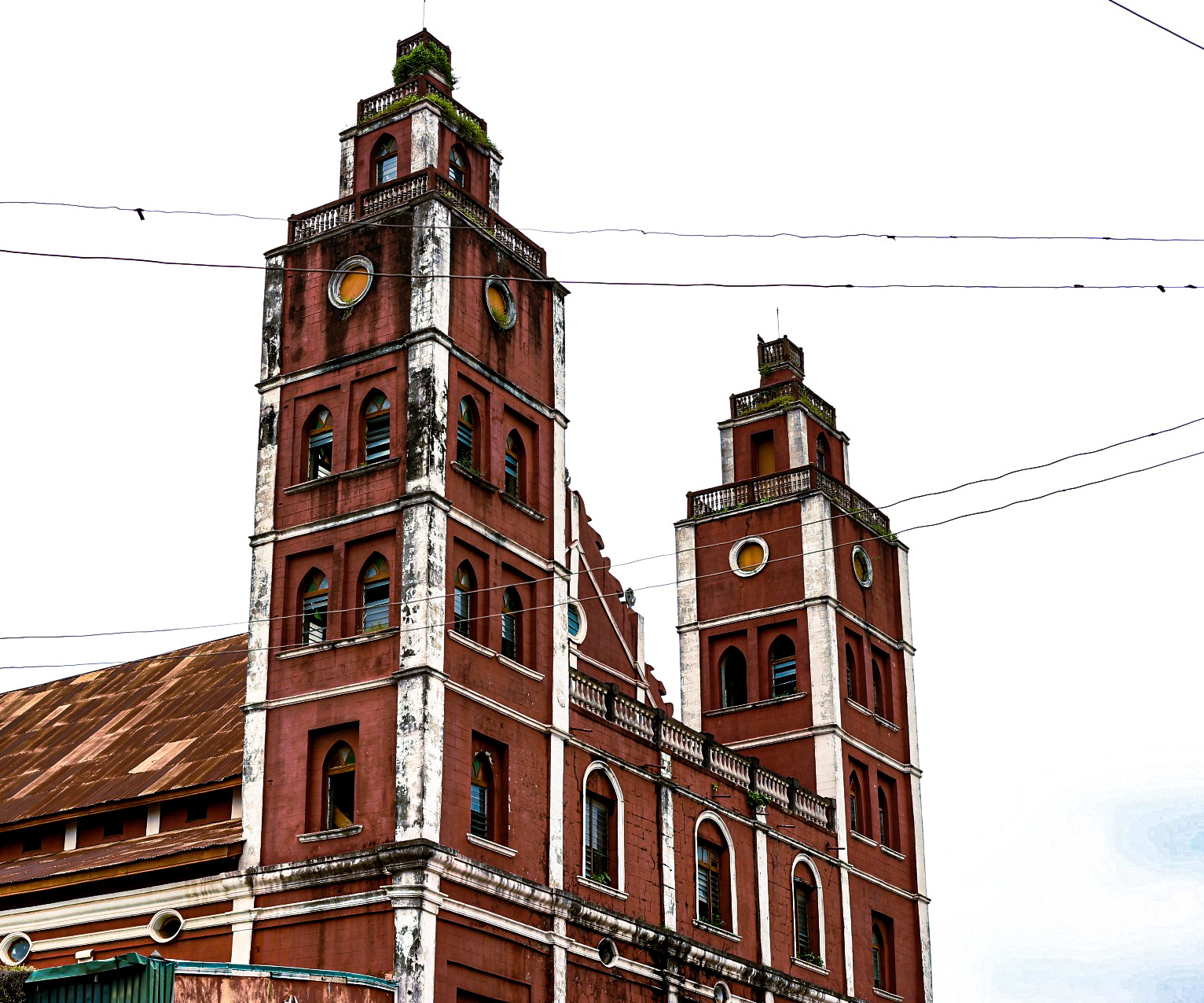
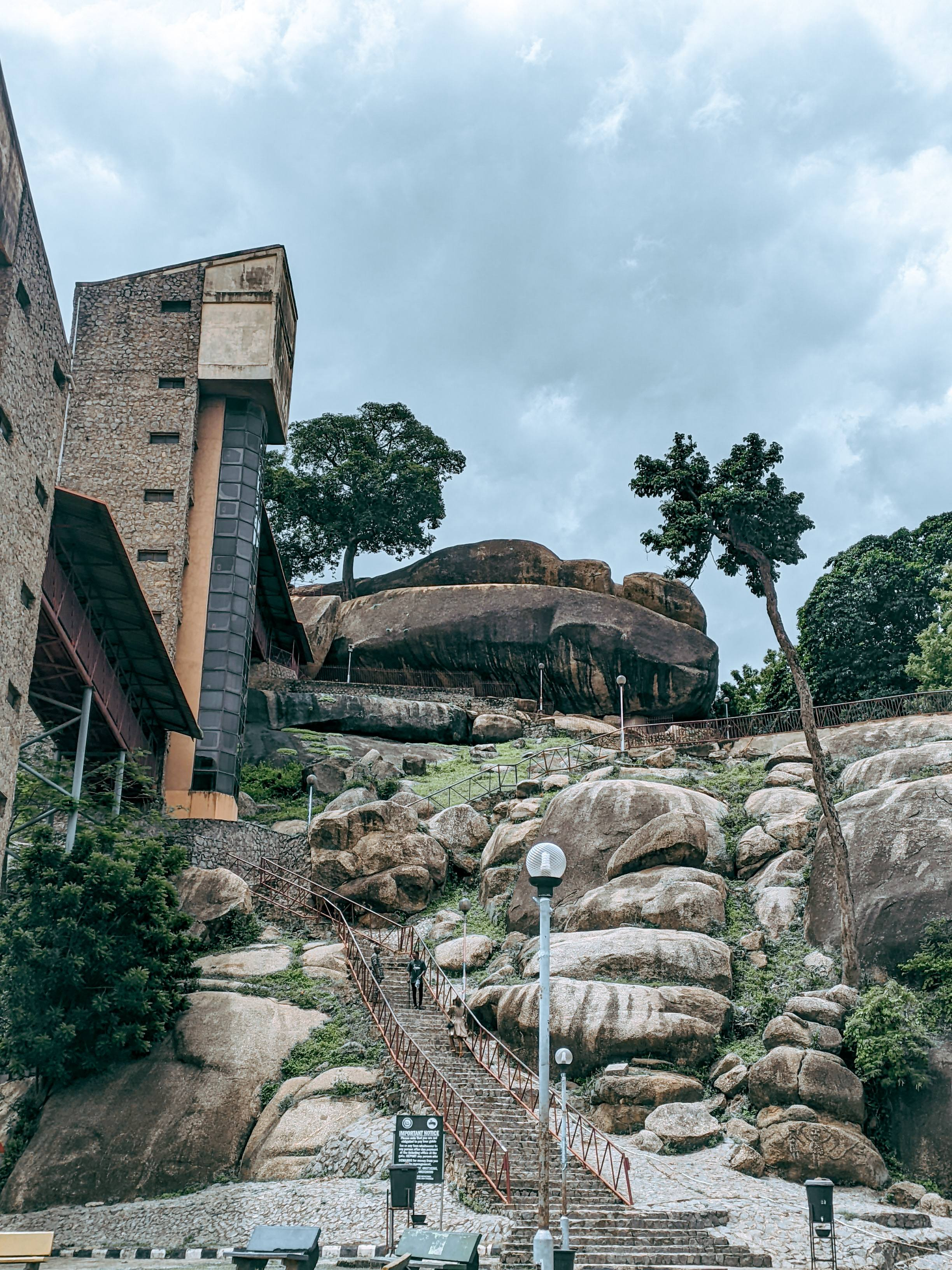
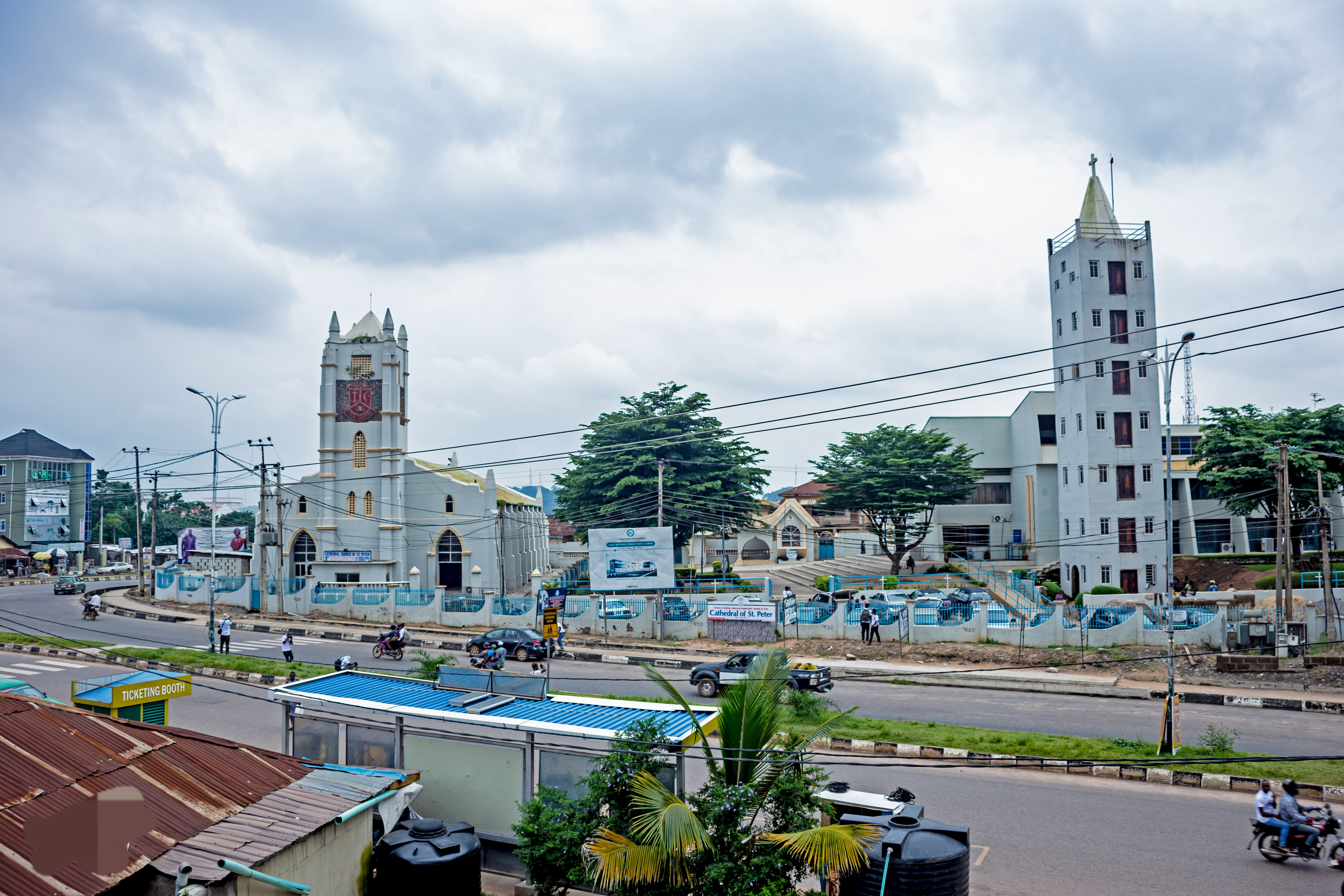
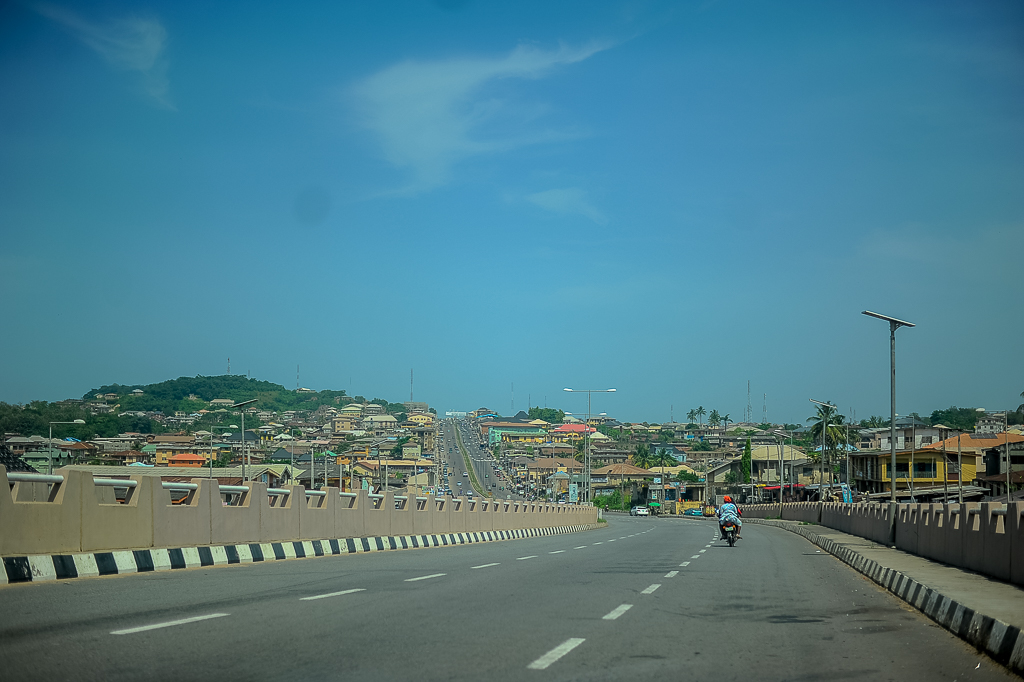
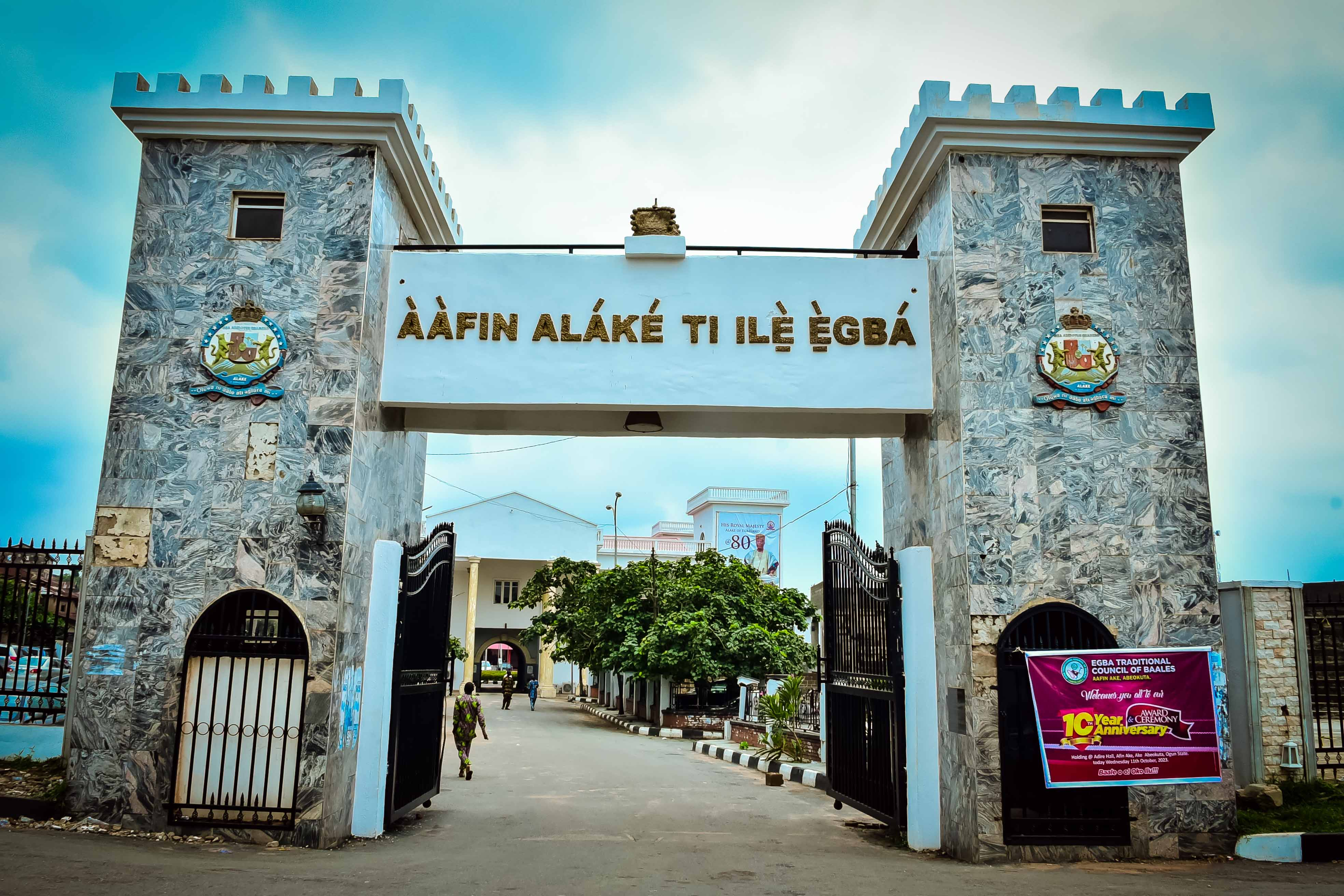
- June 12 Cultural Center Obasanjo Presidential Library Efunroye Statue Centenary Hall, Ake The Old City Adire shopping complex, Itoku Kobiti Mosque Olumo Complex St. Peter's Cathedral, Ake M.K.O. Abiola Way The Alake's Palace

- Location in Nigeria
- Coordinates: 7°9′39″N 3°20′54″E
- Country: Nigeria
- State: Ogun State
- LGAs: Abeokuta North; Abeokuta South; Odeda
- Founded: 1830

Area
  - City: 879 km^{2} (339 sq mi)
- Elevation: 66 m (217 ft)

Population (2006)
  - City: 735,000
  - Density: 836/km^{2} (2,170/sq mi)
  - Metro: 1,117,000
- Climate: Aw
- National language: Yorùbá

Abeokuta is the capital city of Ogun State, which is located in southwestern Nigeria. It is situated on both banks of the Ogun River, near a group of rocky outcrops in a wooded savanna; 77 kilometres (48 mi) north of Lagos by railway, or 130 kilometres (81 mi) by water. As of 2006, Abeokuta (comprising the two local government areas of Abeokuta North and South) had a combined population of 449,088. Its estimated population as at 2022 based on this definition was 735,000 inhabitants, although the city limits has sprawled into the neighbouring LGA of Odeda since the last enumeration exercise.

== Geography and economy ==
Abẹokuta lies in fertile country of wooded savanna, the surface of which is broken by masses of grey granite. It spreads over an extensive area, being surrounded by mud walls 29 km (18 mi) in extent. Palm oil, lumber, natural rubber, yams, rice, cassava, maize, cotton, fruits, and shea butter are the chief articles of trade. It is a key export location for cocoa, palm products, fruits, and kola nuts. Both rice and cotton were introduced by the missionaries in the 1850s and have become integral parts of the economy, along with the dye indigo.

Abeokuta lies below the Olumo Rock, home to several caves and shrines. The city depends on the Oyan River Dam for its water supply, which is not always dependable. The dam is situated in the Abeokuta North local government area of Ogun State in the West of Nigeria, about 20 km northwest of the state capital Abeokuta. The dam crosses the Oyan River, a tributary of the Ogun River.

Abeokuta is the headquarters of the Ogun-Oshun River Basin Development Authority, which is responsible for development of land and water resources for Lagos, Ogun, and Oyo states. Included in its development programme are irrigation, food-processing, and electrification.

Local industries include but are not limited to fruit canning plants, plastics, breweries, sawmills, and an aluminum products factory. South of town are the Aro granite quarries.

== History ==
An account suggests that the early Abeokuta settlements were established by Yoruba migrants from various places within Yoruba land. According to The History of the Yorubas by Samuel Johnson, Eso Ikoyi Chiefs in the retinue of the first Alake of the Egba joined him in founding a new community—the confederacy of towns that became known as Orile Egba—in the forest after they left the nascent Oyo empire in around the 13th century AD. Orile Egba continued to exist until its destruction during the Yoruba Civil Wars of the 19th century. As a result, many of the leading families of the Egba claim descent from the Eso Ikoyis today.

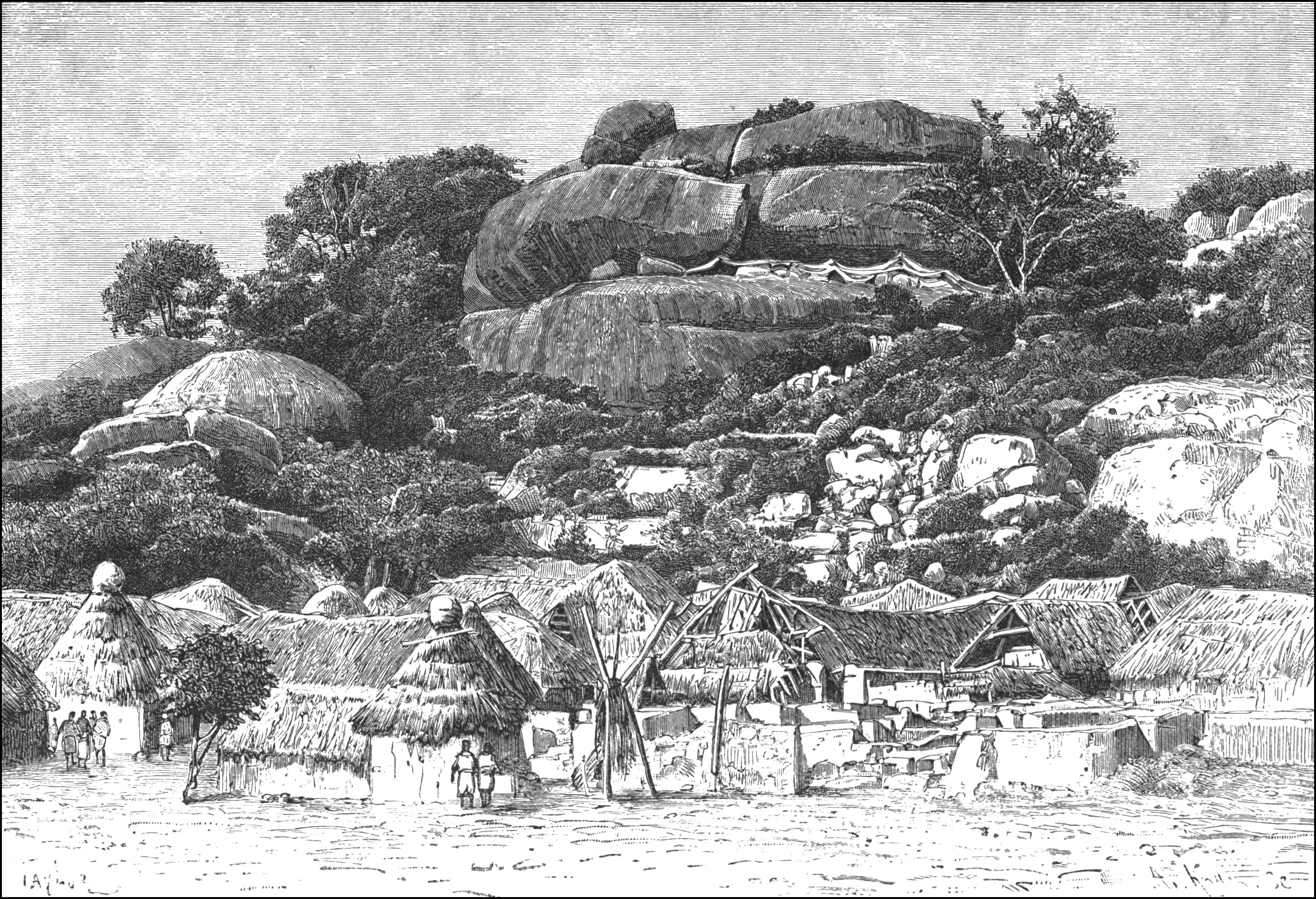
'The Rock of Abeokuta', as drawn c.1892

Abeokuta was founded as a replacement for Orile Egba in around 1830 by the Egbas after the collapse of the Oyo empire during the civil war. The city was founded because of its strong defensive physical position by refugees trying to protect themselves against slave raiders from Dahomey, who were trying to benefit from the war.

The Owu-focused account states that in 1817, the Oyo Empire dissolved into civil war. Refugees displaced by the collapse of Oyo joined with the Ijebu in their war against the Owu in southern Yorubaland, which had broken out around the same time. Following the fall of Owu in around 1822, the leading Ife and Ijebu generals returned to their respective homes, but the rest of the armies that had allied with the Oyo refugees were invited by the Ijebus to Ipara, which they made their headquarters for further attacks against several towns in the region. This group then turned their attention to waging war with the Egba, a loose confederacy of towns that had been established by Yoruba migrants in the 13th century and were spread throughout the forested land between Ipara and Ibadan. The group conquered and destroyed many of these towns, eventually settling in one of the villages that had not been completely destroyed, Ibadan, which they used as their headquarters for additional conquests.

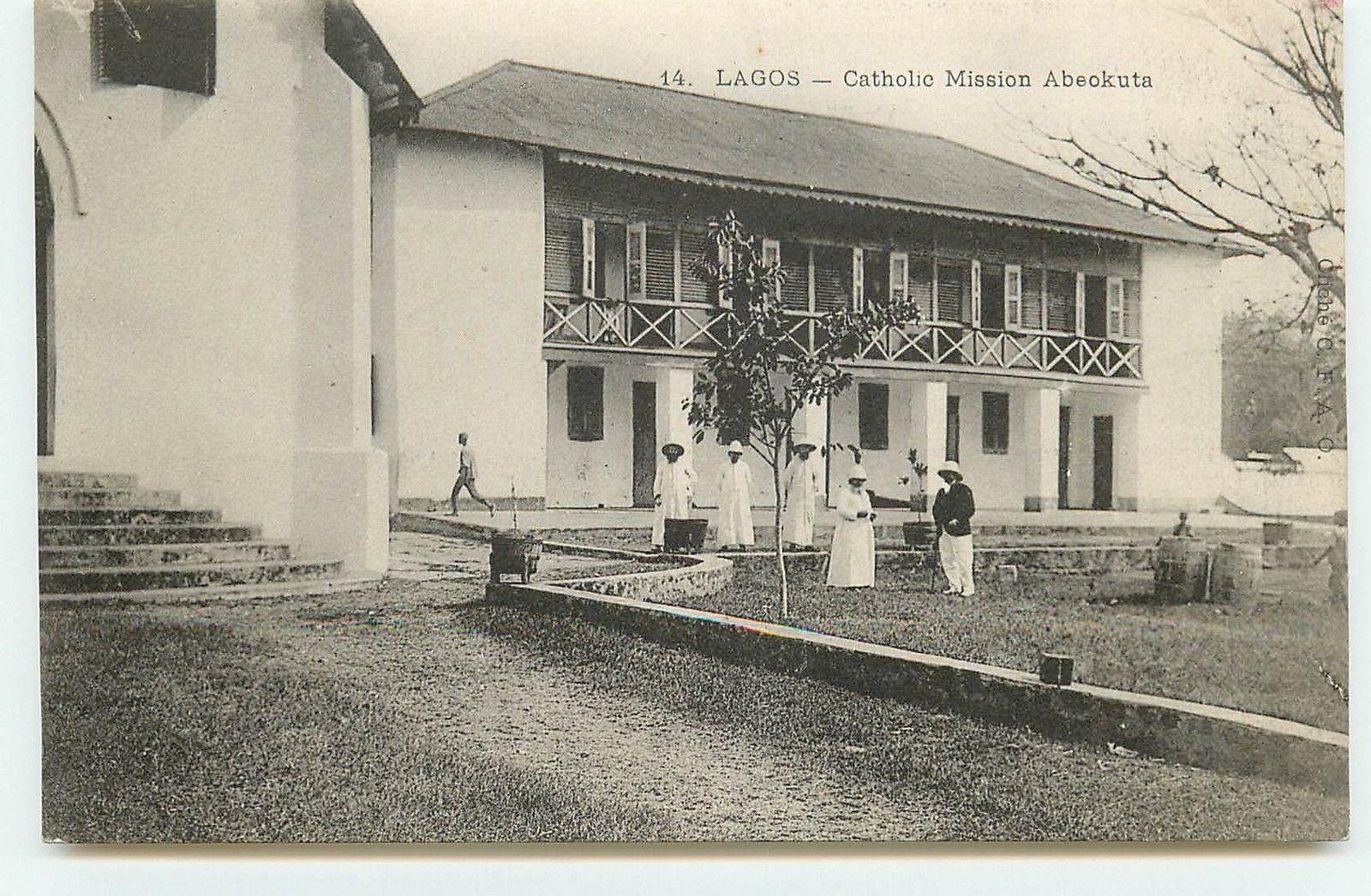
Catholic Mission, Abeokuta

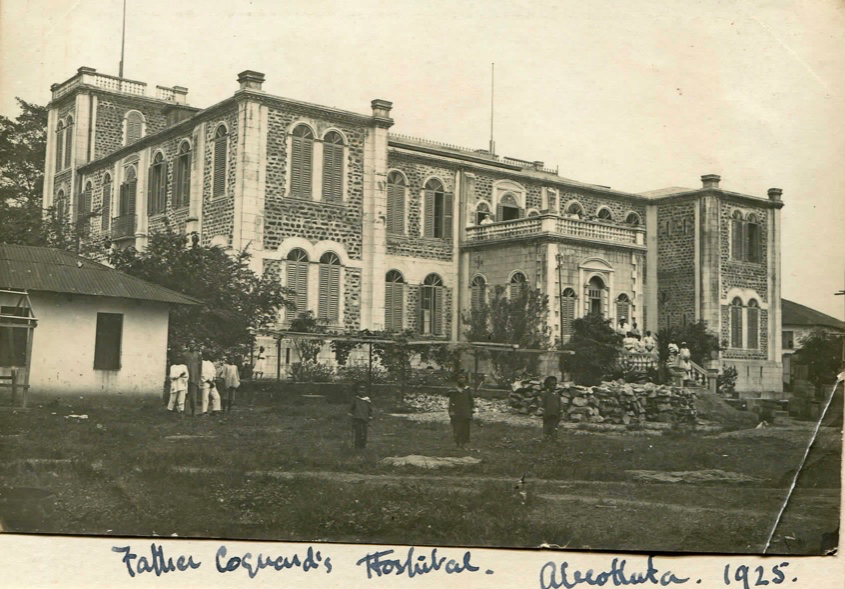
Father Coquard's hospital, Abeokuta, 1925

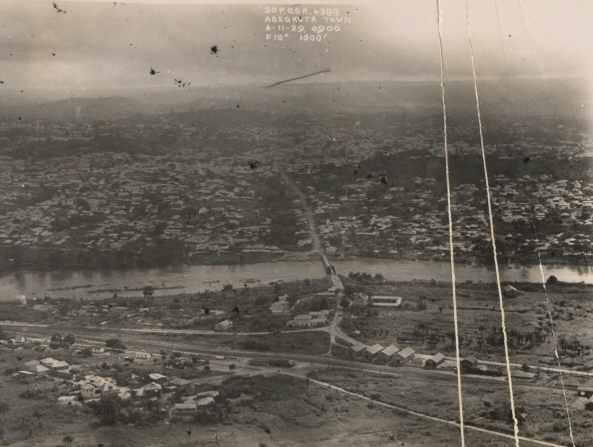
Aerial view of Abeokuta in 1929, with the Ogun river running through

At least a handful of Egba groups had by this point joined the group of marauders, and they too were living at Ibadan. Conflict between the various groups arose, and in one incident, an Egba chief named Lamodi shot an Ife chief named Ege to death with a pistol at a public meeting before himself being killed in the ensuing commotion. Fearing Ife reprisal, most of the Egba population withdrew as a group to an encampment about 3 or 4 miles distant on the other side of the Ona River. Here they enlisted Sodeke to be their leader and migrated to a hilly area known as Olumo Rock, where they established the town of Abeokuta around 1830 at what was then a small farming village.

Nevertheless, all accounts agree that in the 19th century, the Olumo Rock became a place of refuge for displaced Yoruba people during the Yoruba Revolutionary Wars, and from the Dahomey slave hunters. People were scattered throughout the landscape, taking shelter among the rocks surrounding the settlement. The Egba who established Abeokuta were soon joined by other Egba refugees and a substantial number of Owu who had escaped their captors. It became a busy metropolis and home to the majority of the Egba. However, the various groups of Egba did not fuse into a single community; rather, Abeokuta functioned more as a "federation of communities within a town wall than a community in its own right".

Because Abeokuta was in a key location for the palm oil trade and because it was the so-called capital of the Egbas, Dahomey soon became hostile. In the 1851 Battle of Abeokuta, the Egba defeated King Gezo and the Dahomey incursion. They again beat back the Dahomey military in 1864.

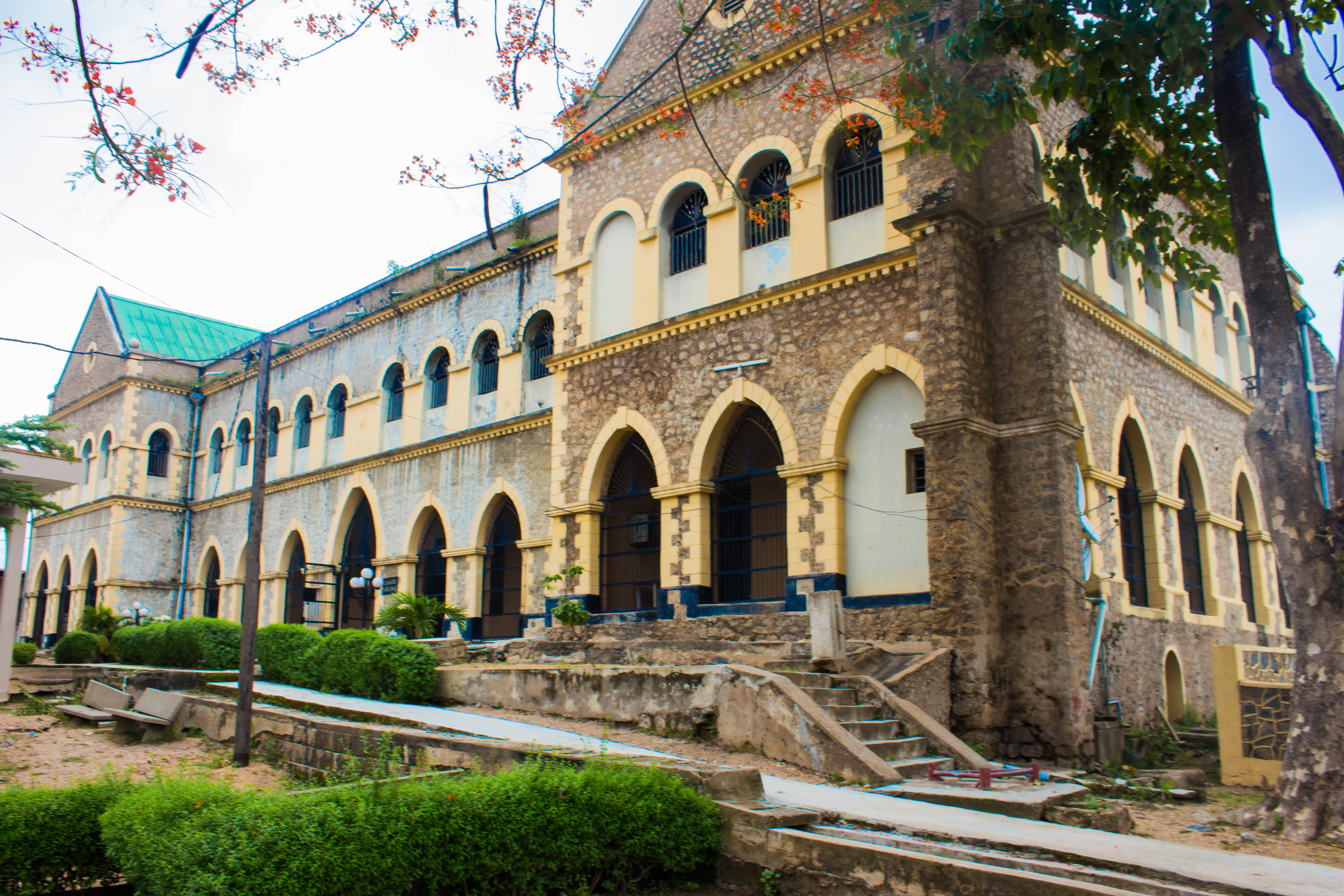
Abeokuta Grammar School Old School Hall

The 1860s also saw problems arise with the Europeans, namely the British in Lagos, which led to the Egba first closing trade routes, followed by the expulsion of missionaries and traders in 1867. Between 1877 and 1893 the Yoruba Civil Wars occurred, and Abeokuta opposed Ibadan, which led the king or alake of the Egba to sign an alliance with the British governor, Sir Gilbert Carter. This occurred in 1893, which formalized the Egba United Government based in Abẹokuta which became recognized by the United Kingdom. In 1914, the Egba lands were incorporated into the colony of Nigeria by the British, with Abeokuta as the provincial capital.

In 1918, an uprising took place, the Adubi War, which was related to the levying of taxes and the policy of indirect rule by Sir Frederick Lugard, the British Governor-General. This was the only internal threat to British control of Nigeria during the course of the First World War.

The Abeokuta Women's Revolt, led by the Abeokuta Women's Union (AWU), took place in the 1940s. It was a resistance movement against the imposition of unfair taxation by the Nigerian colonial government.

In 1976, Abeokuta became the capital of the newly created Ogun State.

== Transportation ==
Abeokuta is connected to nearby Lagos by a railway that was completed in 1899, with a length of 77 kilometres (48 mi). In 2013, the Abeokuta flyover was constructed. Since 2021 there is a standard gauge railway line Lagos-Ibadan, which stops at Abeokuta. For this a new railway building has been built in Abeokuta. Tickets are bought by online booking only.

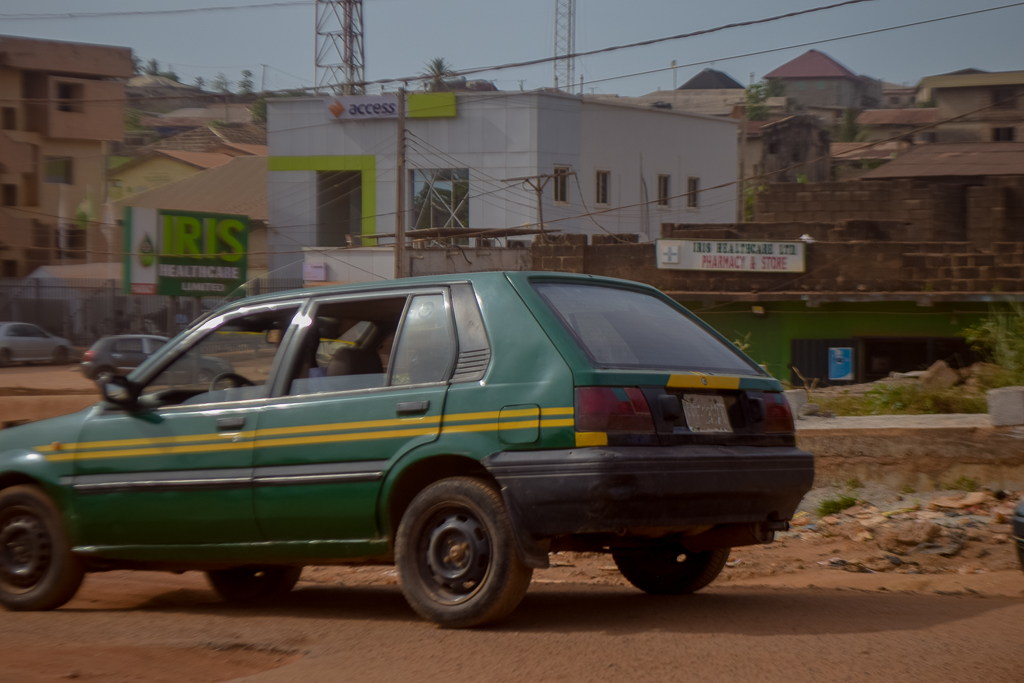
Abeokuta Taxi

Roads connect it to Lagos as well as Ibadan, Ilaro, Shagamu, Iseyin, Sango Ota, and Ketou.

== Tourism ==
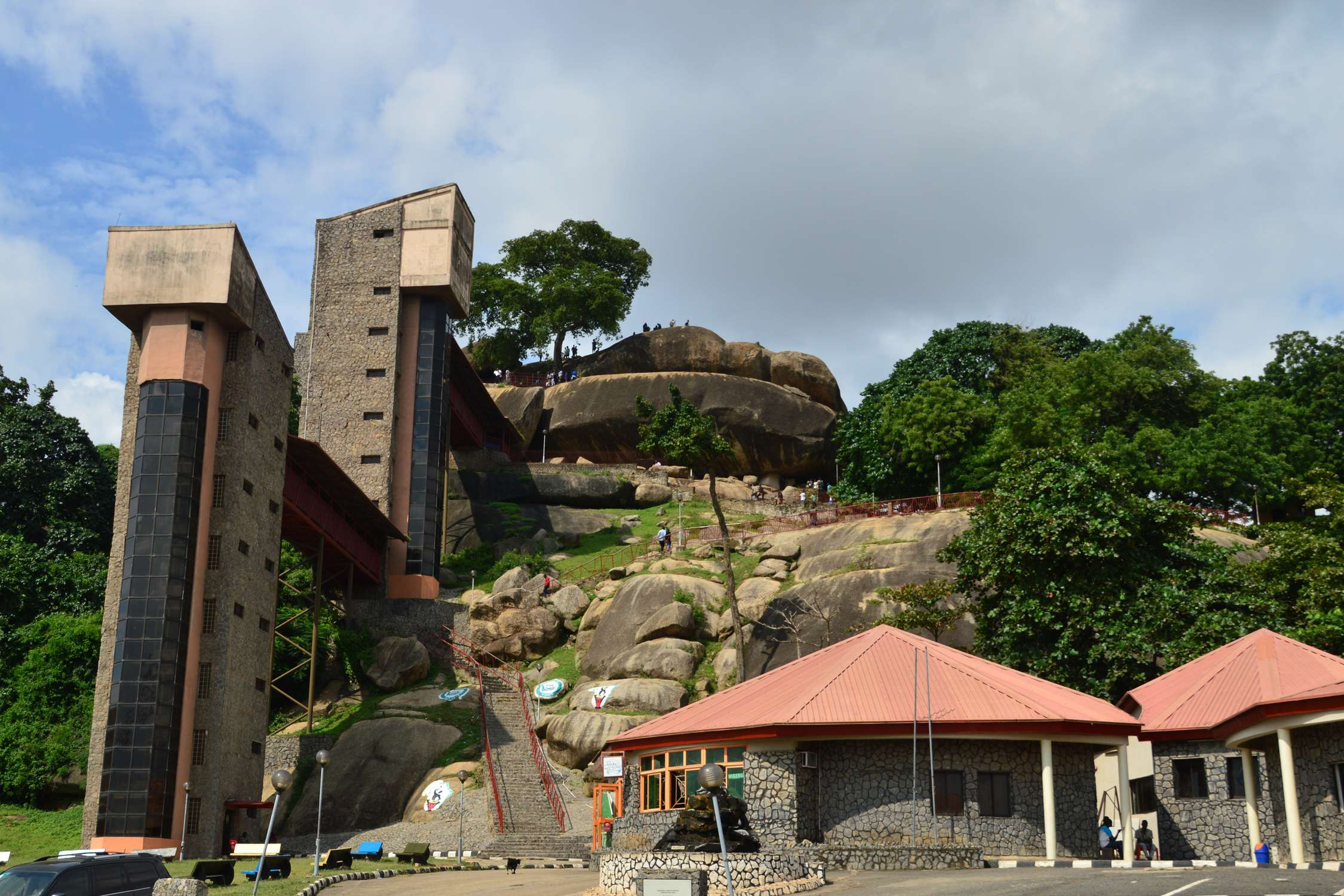
Olumo Rock in Abeokuta

Abeokuta's name already refers to several rock formations in the neighbourhood, especially Olumo Rock. Visitors should be aware that the rock has a spiritual significance and respectful behaviour is therefore strongly recommended.

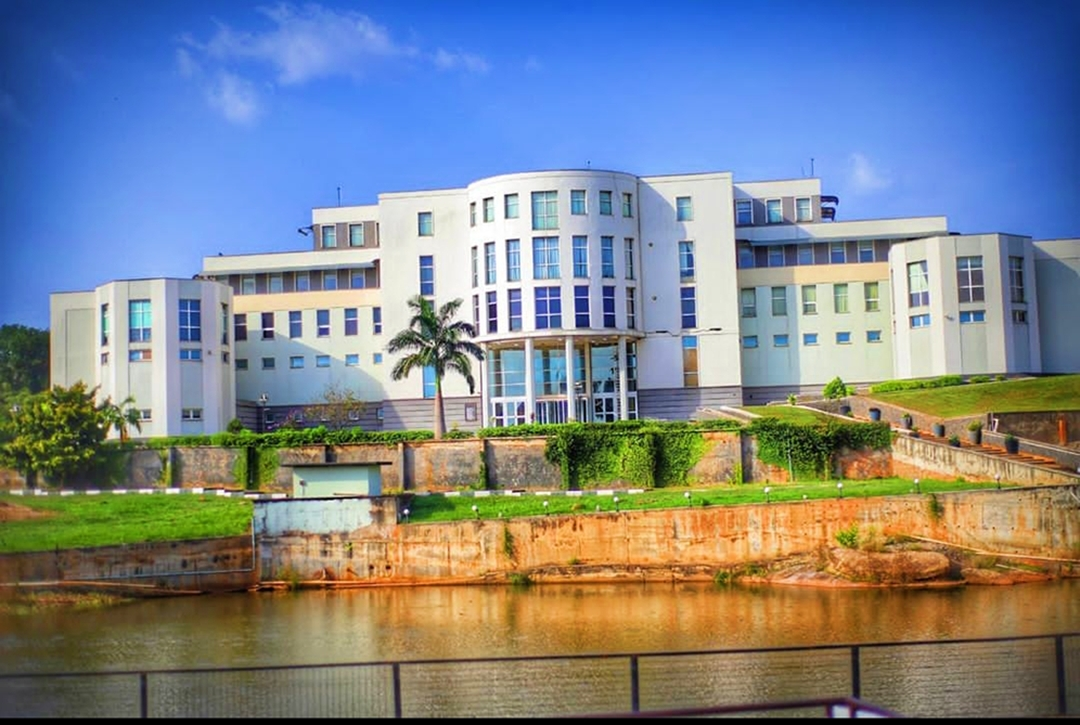
Olusegun Obasanjo Presidential Library

The Olusegun Obasanjo Presidential Library is another tourist destination in Abeokuta. (As a colonel in the Biafra War, Obasanjo carried out the decisive operation to defeat the secessionist region of Biafra, was later Chief of Staff under dictator Murtala Mohammed, escaped assassination by mistaken identity during a coup, became dictator himself, and led his country into democracy; was on death row under Sani Abacha and then democratically elected twice as the first president of the Fourth Republic, which still exists today.) The library is less a library than a museum about the eventful life of the general and politician.

== Climate ==
Climate data for Abeokuta (1991–2020)
Month	Jan	Feb	Mar	Apr	May	Jun	Jul	Aug	Sep	Oct	Nov	Dec	Year
Record high °C (°F)	39.4 (102.9)	40.1 (104.2)	39.8 (103.6)	39.0 (102.2)	39.6 (103.3)	35.6 (96.1)	34.5 (94.1)	34.2 (93.6)	34.0 (93.2)	38.0 (100.4)	37.7 (99.9)	38.4 (101.1)	40.1 (104.2)
Mean daily maximum °C (°F)	35.3 (95.5)	36.5 (97.7)	35.8 (96.4)	34.6 (94.3)	33.0 (91.4)	31.3 (88.3)	29.8 (85.6)	29.4 (84.9)	30.3 (86.5)	31.9 (89.4)	34.0 (93.2)	34.9 (94.8)	33.1 (91.6)
Daily mean °C (°F)	28.8 (83.8)	30.4 (86.7)	30.5 (86.9)	29.8 (85.6)	28.6 (83.5)	27.5 (81.5)	26.4 (79.5)	26.1 (79.0)	26.7 (80.1)	27.6 (81.7)	28.8 (83.8)	28.7 (83.7)	28.3 (82.9)
Mean daily minimum °C (°F)	22.3 (72.1)	24.3 (75.7)	25.1 (77.2)	25.0 (77.0)	24.3 (75.7)	23.6 (74.5)	23.1 (73.6)	22.9 (73.2)	23.1 (73.6)	23.3 (73.9)	23.5 (74.3)	22.5 (72.5)	23.6 (74.5)
Record low °C (°F)	10.2 (50.4)	12.3 (54.1)	16.0 (60.8)	18.0 (64.4)	19.0 (66.2)	19.6 (67.3)	19.6 (67.3)	19.2 (66.6)	19.7 (67.5)	19.0 (66.2)	13.9 (57.0)	11.8 (53.2)	10.2 (50.4)
Average precipitation mm (inches)	5.3 (0.21)	24.9 (0.98)	70.5 (2.78)	117.9 (4.64)	164.6 (6.48)	189.4 (7.46)	192.1 (7.56)	103.3 (4.07)	203.4 (8.01)	146.1 (5.75)	23.7 (0.93)	5.2 (0.20)	1,246.3 (49.07)
Average precipitation days (≥ 1.0 mm)	0.6	2.0	5.2	7.7	10.7	12.3	11.7	9.0	12.9	11.6	2.2	0.5	86.3
Average relative humidity (%)	76.0	79.7	84.3	87.3	89.0	90.1	89.6	88.6	89.7	89.6	85.5	78.5	85.7
Source: NOAA

== Notable buildings ==
Abeokuta was once surrounded by 29 kilometres (18 mi) of wall, and remnants of the historic wall still exist today. Ake, the traditional residence of the Alake, along with Centenary Hall (1930), are both in the Egba Alake's territory. There are secondary and primary schools and the University of Lagos Abeokuta Campus opened in 1984. This campus specializes in science, agriculture, and technology. This has since been changed to an independent full-fledged tertiary institution, Federal University of Agriculture, Abeokuta (FUNAAB) in 1988.

The Green Legacy Resort is a large resort/hotel built by former president Olusegun Obasanjo and investors. The Olusegun Obasanjo Presidential Library (OOPL) is also located within the grounds of the resort.

The governor's office located at Oke-Mosan is also a notable building. The Federal University of Agriculture, Abeokuta (FUNAAB), Federal College of Education, Osiele, are also notable locations in Abeokuta.

== Notable people from Abeokuta ==
- Chief Moshood Abiola, businessman, politician and presidential candidate.
- Chief Simeon Adebo, a Nigerian administrator, lawyer and diplomat.
- Odunlade Adekola: Nollywood Actor
- Sir Adetokunbo Ademola, Chief Justice of Nigeria and son of the Alake of Egbaland Sir Ladapo Ademola.
- Prince Bola Ajibola, former World Court judge.
- Dr. Tunde Bakare, pastor.
- Dimeji Bankole, politician and businessman.
- Princess Sarah Forbes Bonetta, Egbado princess of the Yoruba people, goddaughter of Queen Victoria.
- Jean-Marie Coquard, French Christian medical missionary
- Oba Adedotun Aremu Gbadebo III, monarch and businessman.
- Abimbola Jayeola, Nigeria first female helicopter pilot
- Fela Kuti, musician and political activist.
- Mudashiru Lawal, footballer and sports analyst.
- Shane Lawal, basketball player.
- Lijadu Sisters, identical twin sisters that were an iconic music pair in Africa between the 1960s and 1980s.
- Chief Olusegun Obasanjo, President of Nigeria from 1999 to 2007.
- Ebenezer Obey, juju musician and evangelist.
- Segun Odegbami, footballer and sports analyst.
- Akin Ogungbe, film actor, film maker, producer and director.
- Princess Bola Kuforiji-Olubi, former federal minister.
- Chief Olusegun Osoba, politician and businessman.
- Tunji Oyelana, musician, actor, folk singer and composer.
- Sir Shina Peters, musician and businessman.
- Shina Rambo, bandit
- Chief Funmilayo Ransome-Kuti, women's rights activist.
- Professor Olikoye Ransome-Kuti, professor of pediatrics, former Minister of Health.
- Chief Ernest Shonekan, businessman and former head of the defunct interim government of Nigeria.
- Ike Shorunmu, footballer and coach.
- Jimi Solanke, actor, musician, storyteller and playwright.
- Professor Wole Soyinka, Nobel Prize-winning author.
- Oba Adedapo Tejuoso, monarch and businessman.
- Chief Bisoye Tejuoso, businesswoman and titled aristocrat.
- Efunroye Tinubu, titled aristocrat.
- Chief Akintola Williams, accountant, founder of ICAN.
- Chief Frederick Rotimi Williams, legal scholar.

== Gallery ==
Some Notable places in Abeokuta

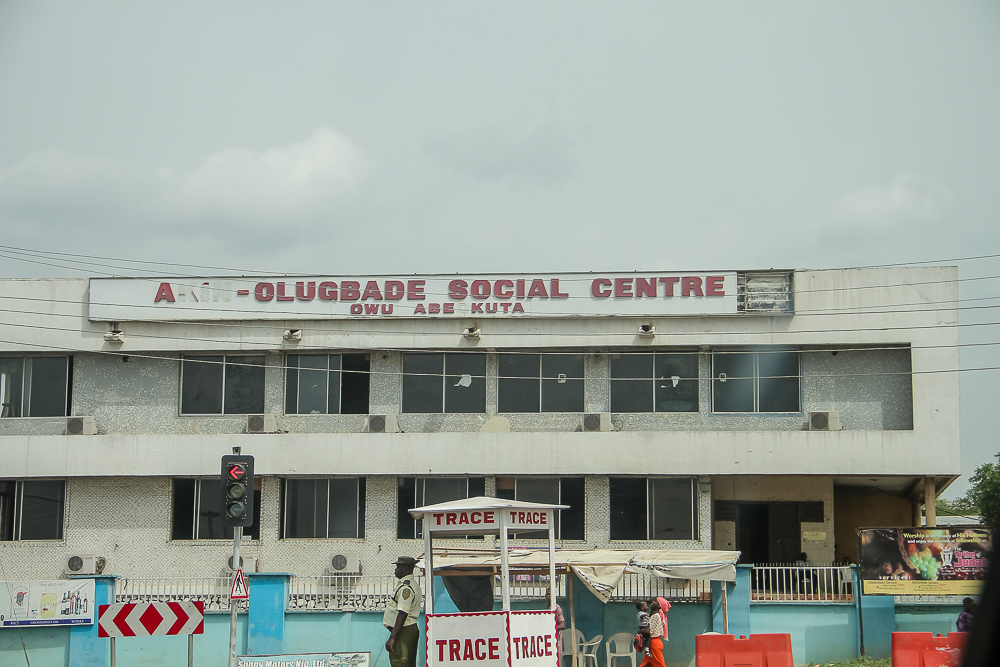
Akin Olugbade Social Centre, Owu, Abeokuta

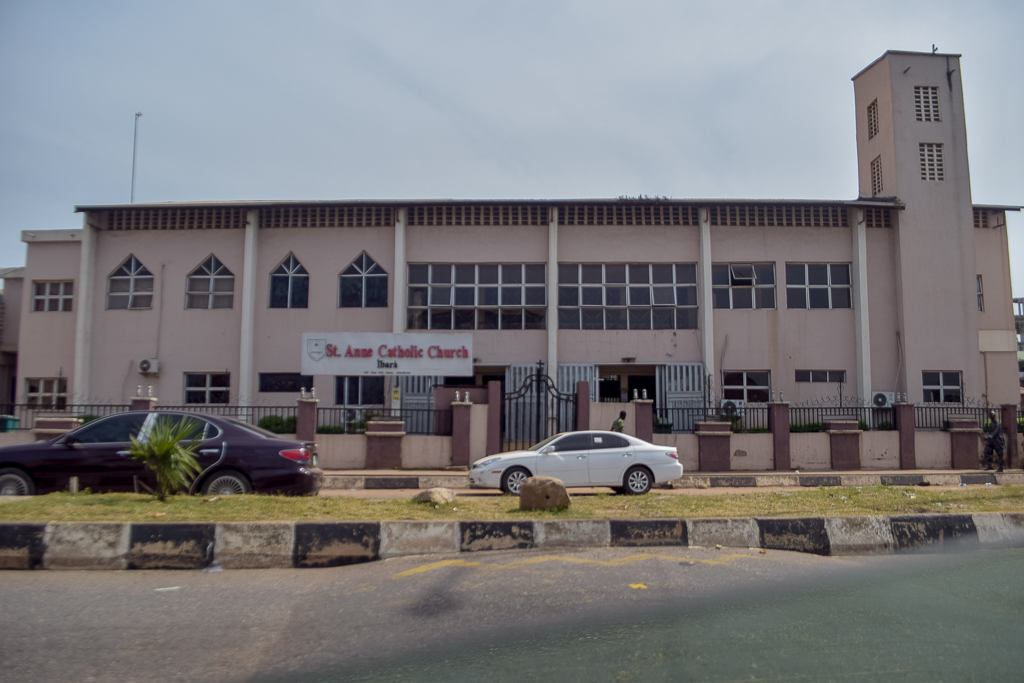
St. Anne Catholic Church, Ibara, Abeokuta

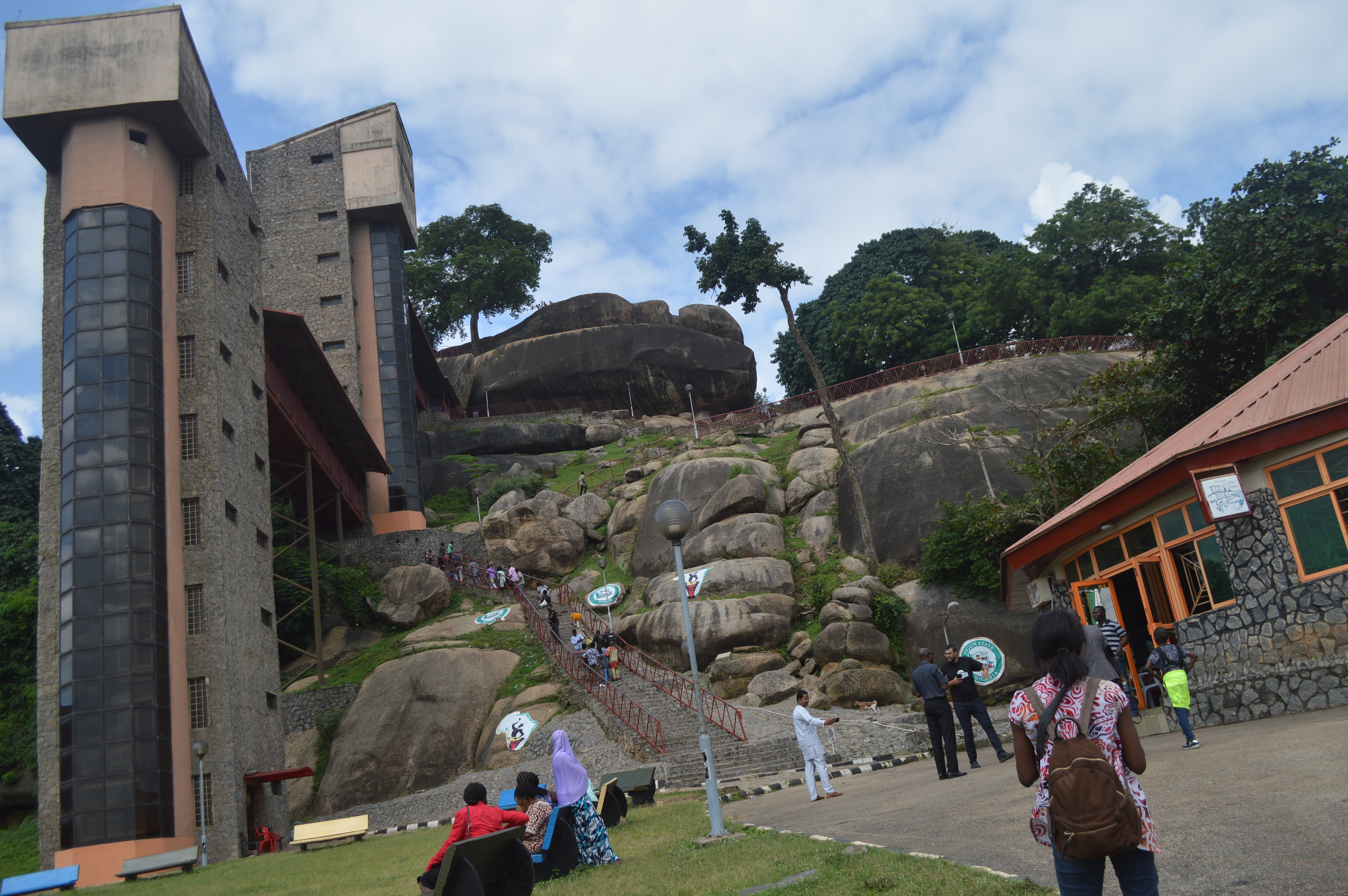
Olumo Rock, Abeokuta

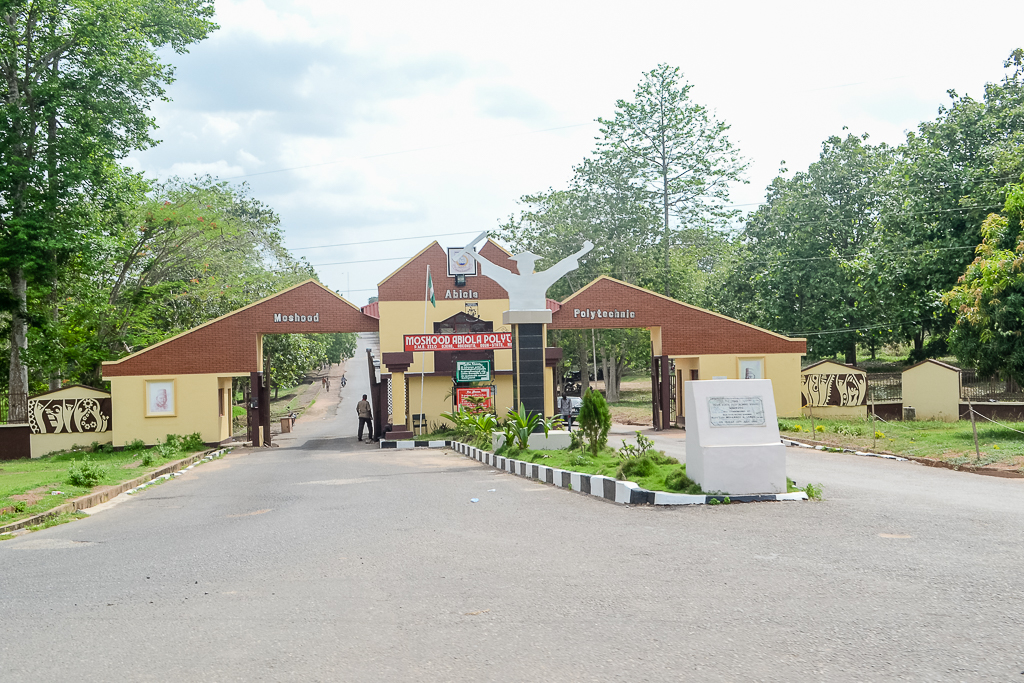
Moshood Abiola Polytechnic, Ojere (Main Entrance)

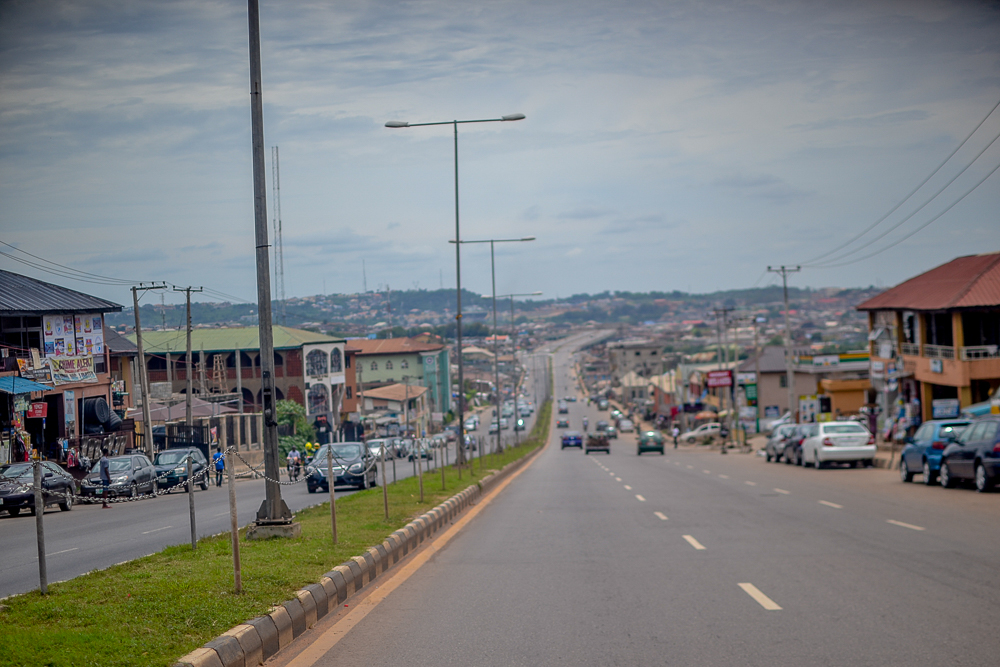
Abiola way, Abeokuta

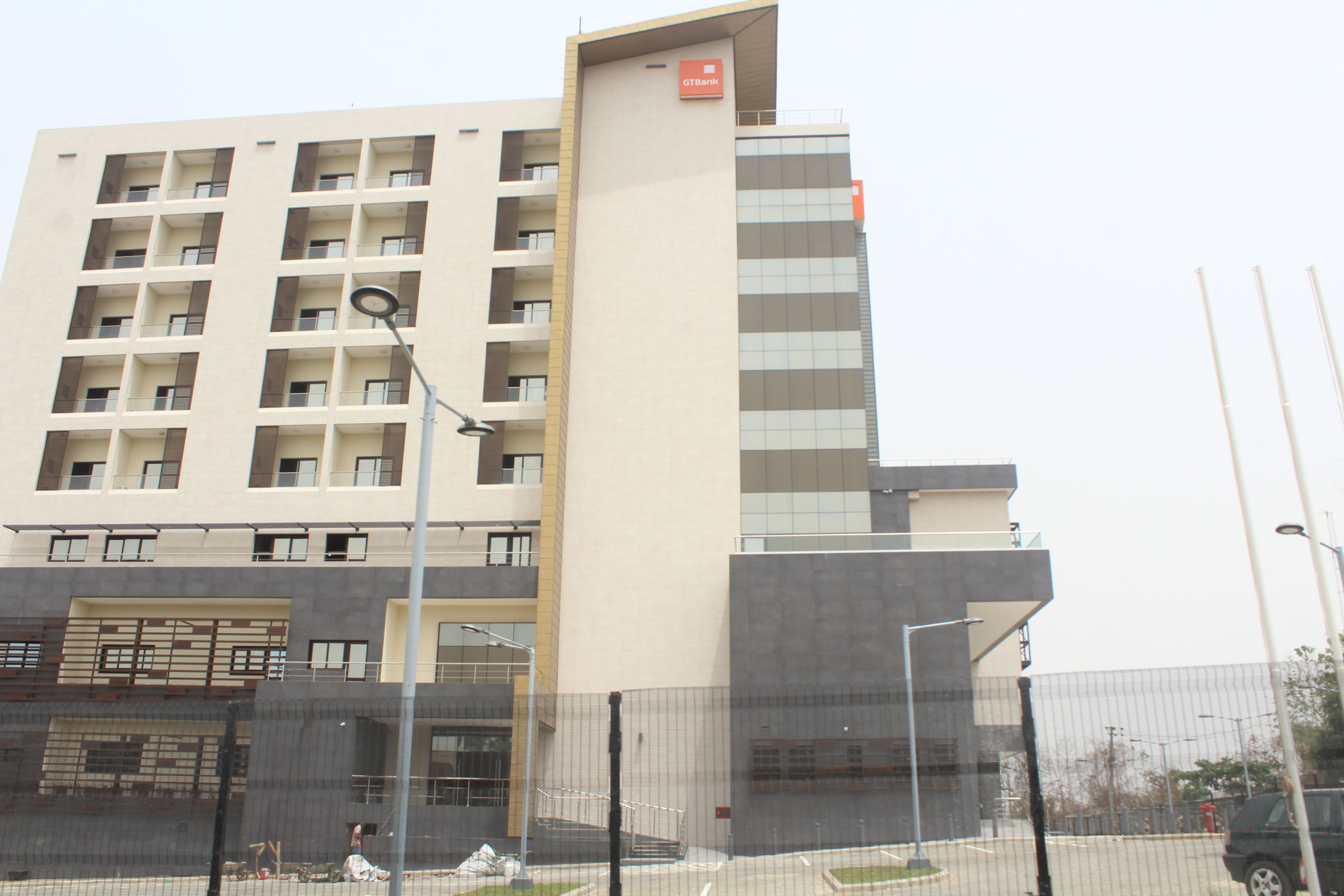
Guaranty Trust Bank building, Abeokuta

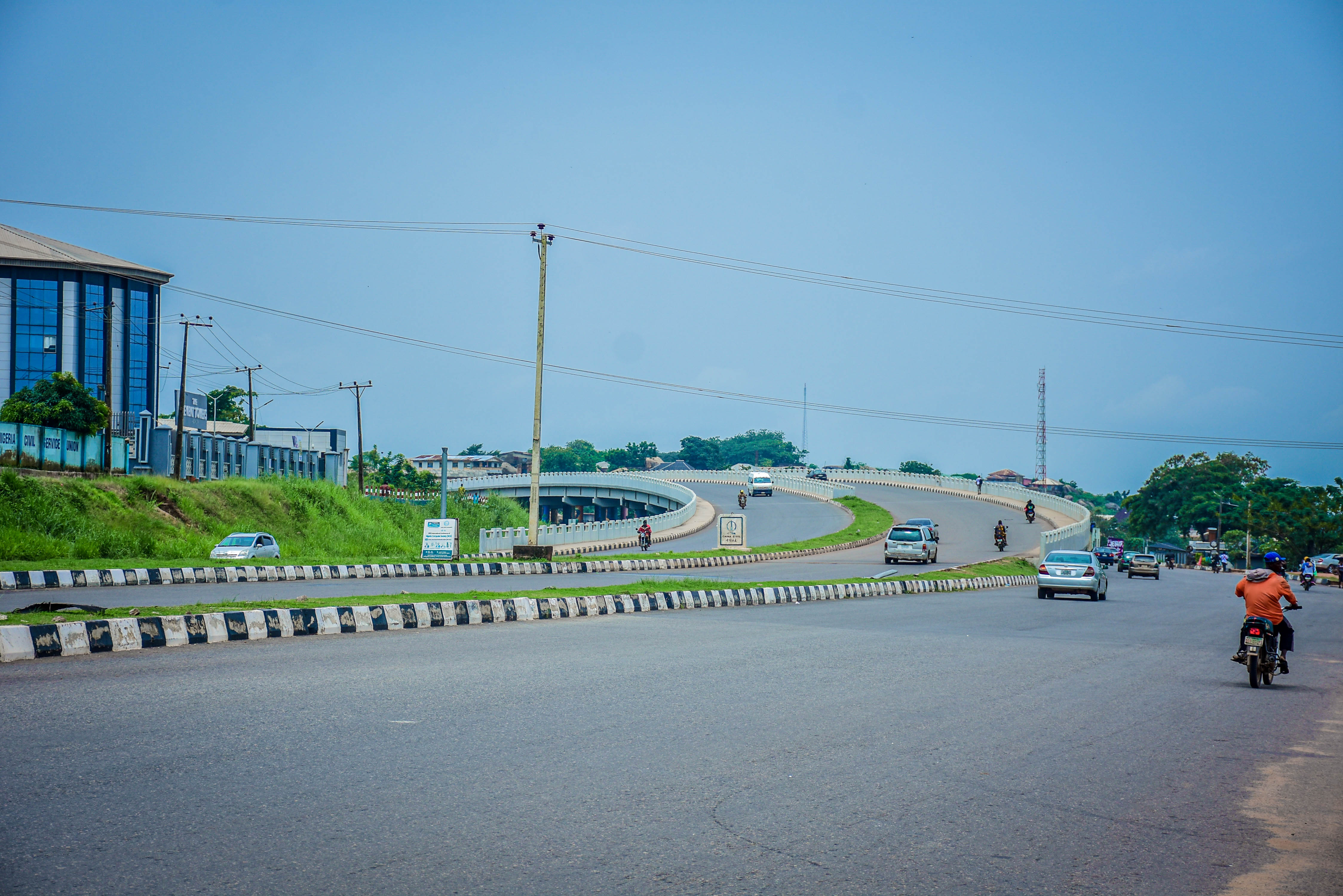
Abeokuta metropolis

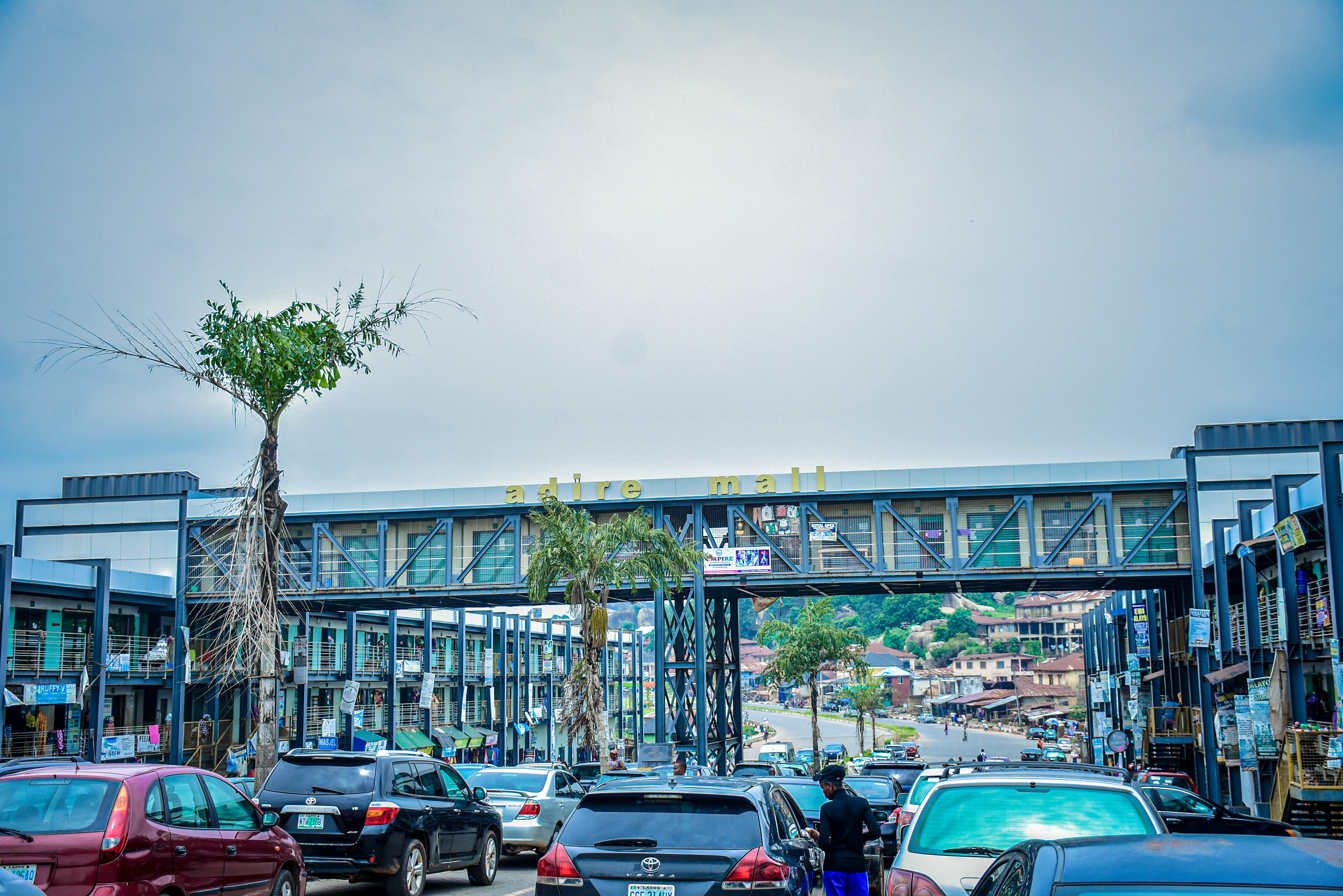
Adire Mall, Itoku Abeokuta

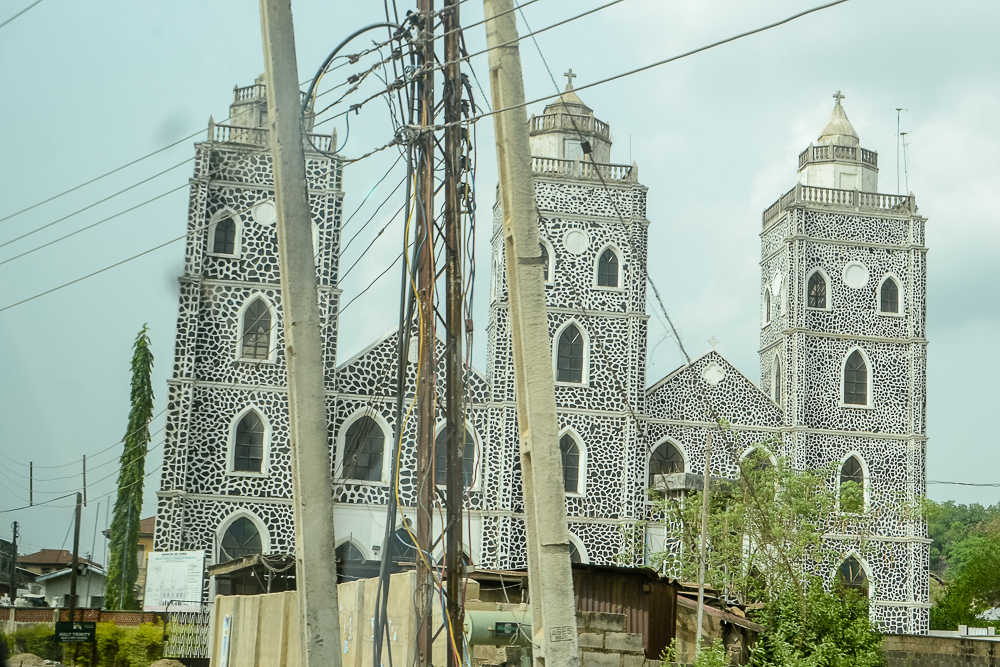
Diocese of Egba (Anglican Communion)

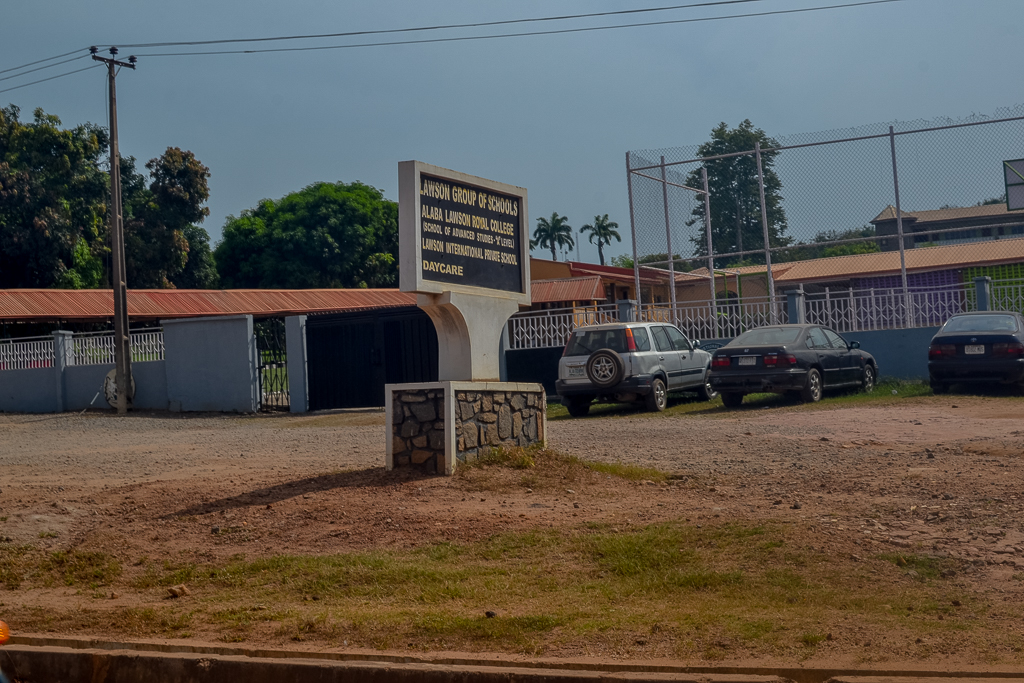
Alaba Lawson School, Abeokuta

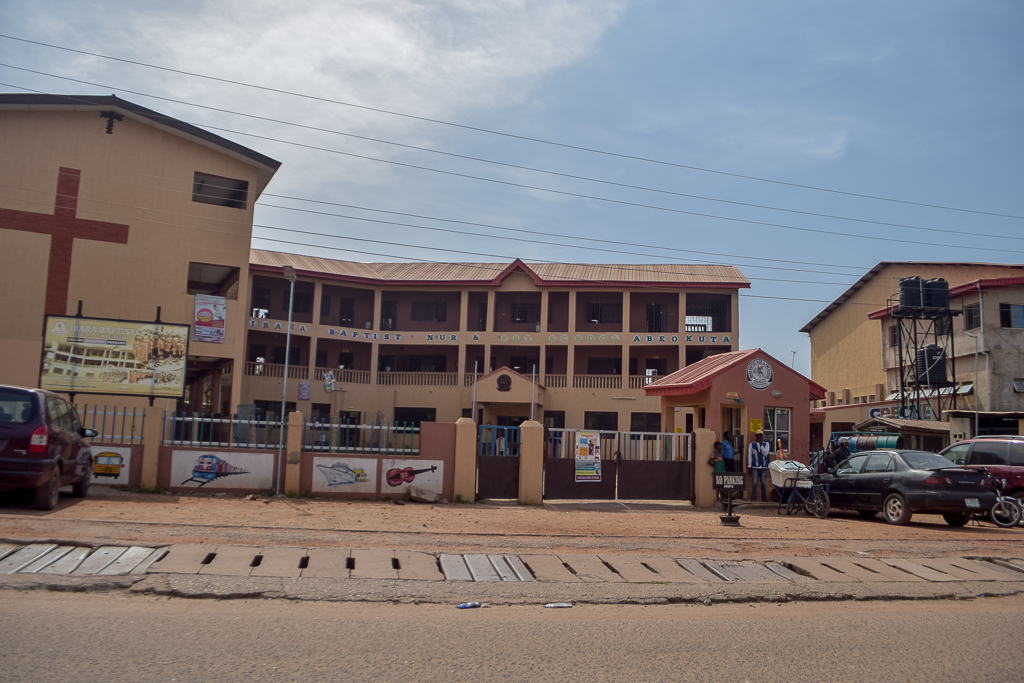
Ibara Baptist Nursery/Primary School, Abeokuta

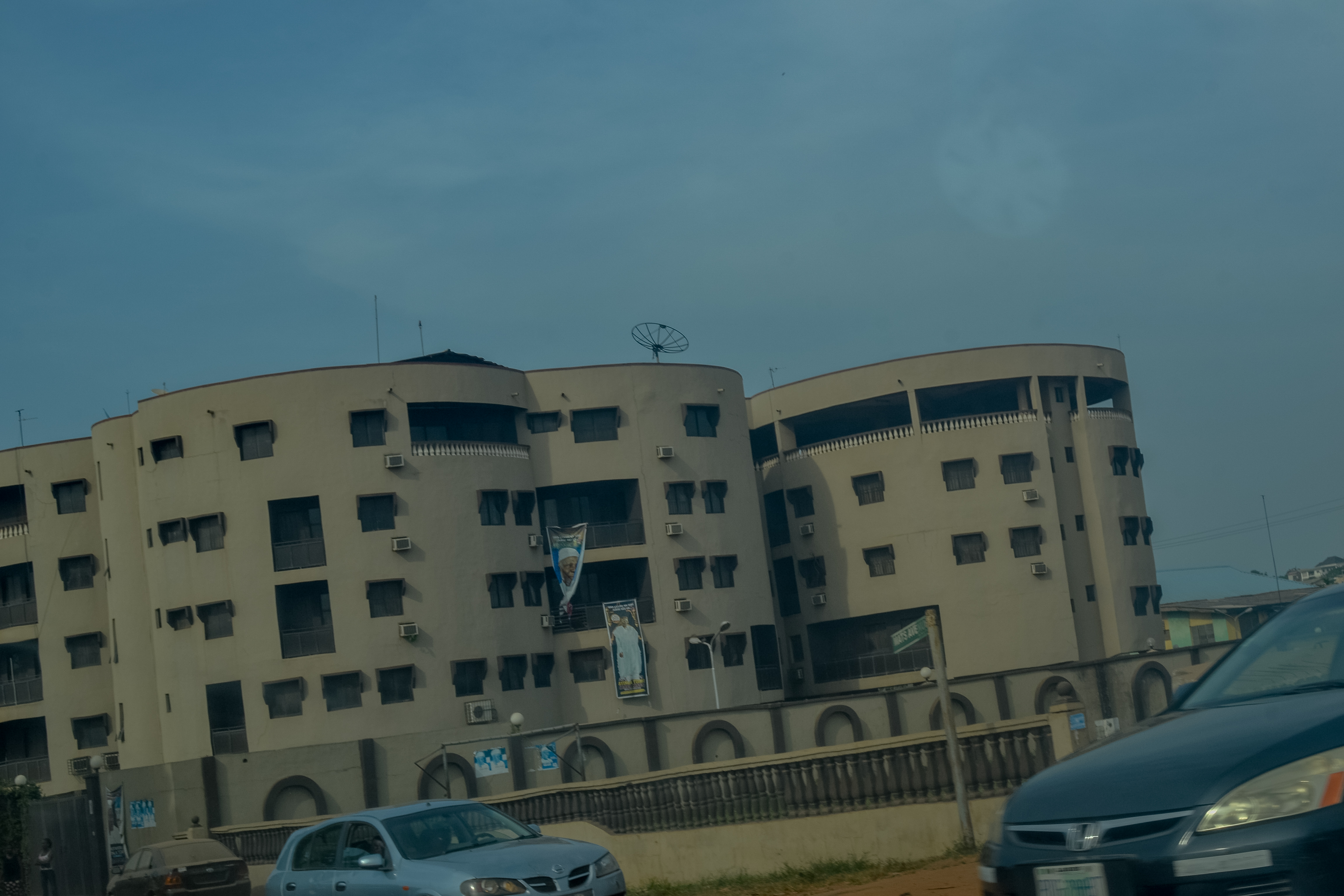
Alhaji M.A. Tijanni (Baba MAT), Asero, Abeokuta

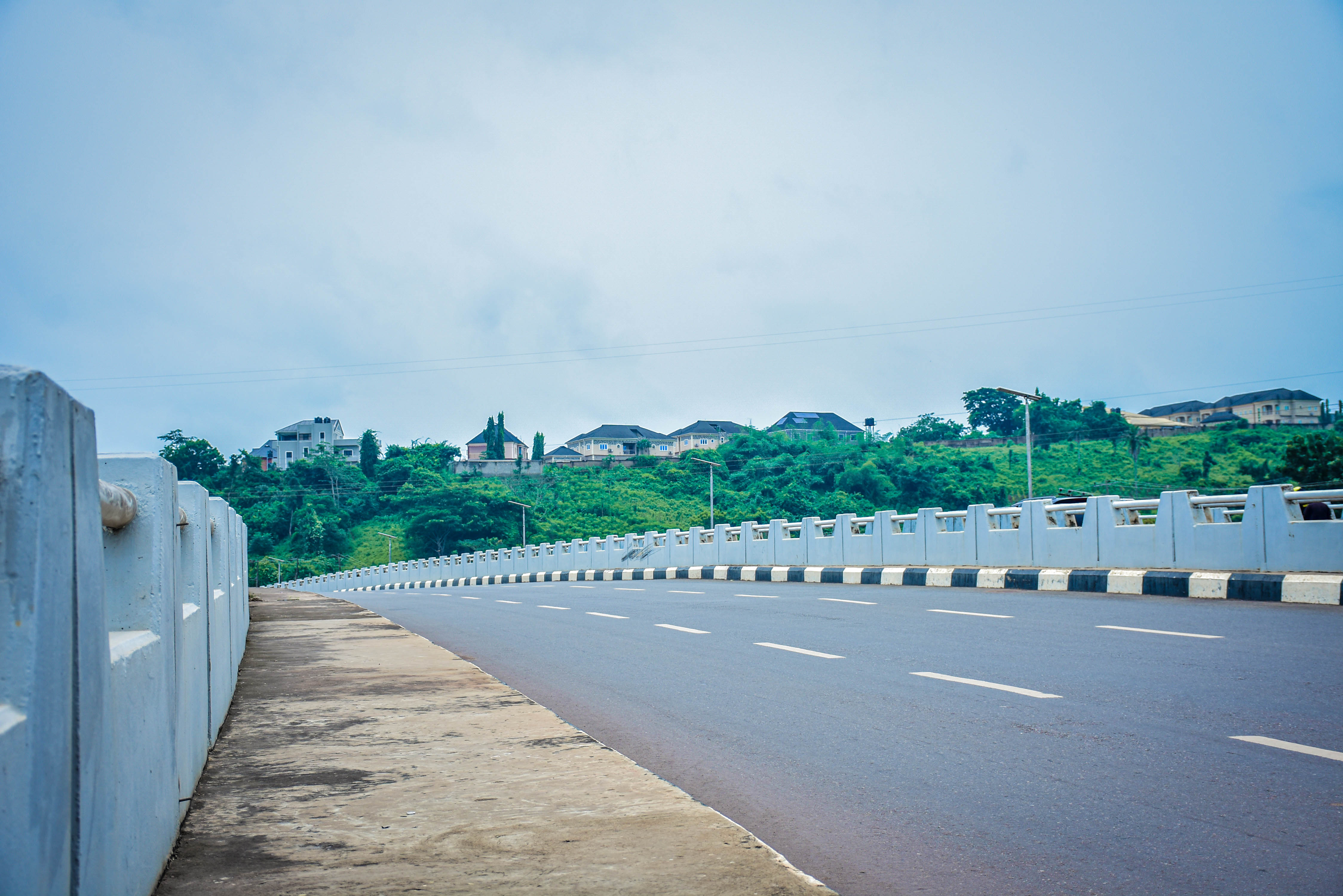
Around The Abeokuta Metropolis

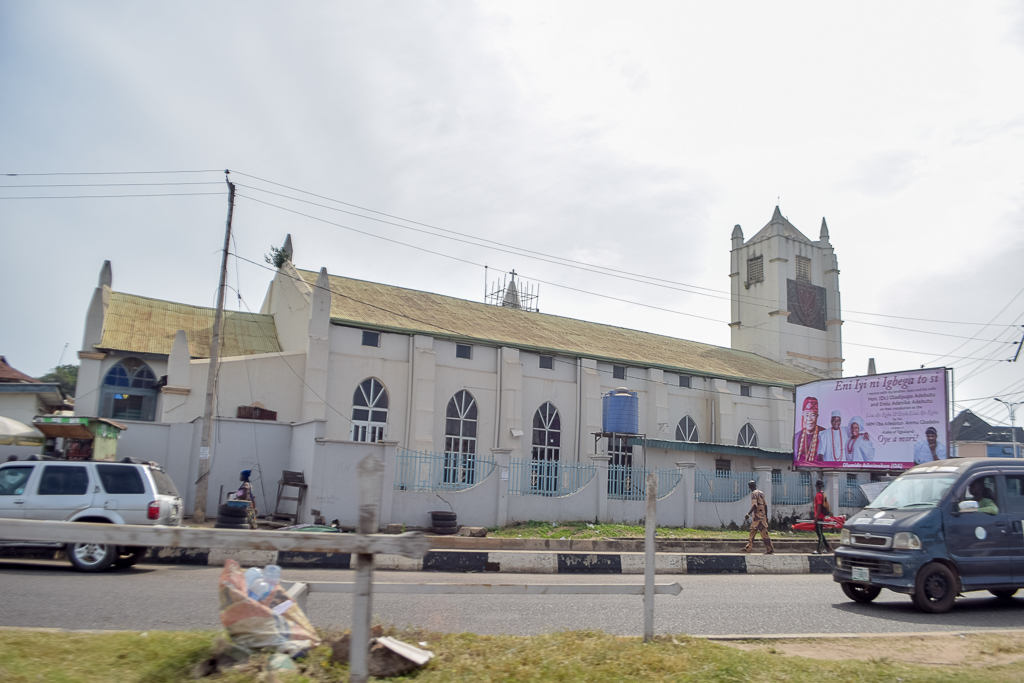
Cathedral of St. Peter Anglican church, Abeokuta

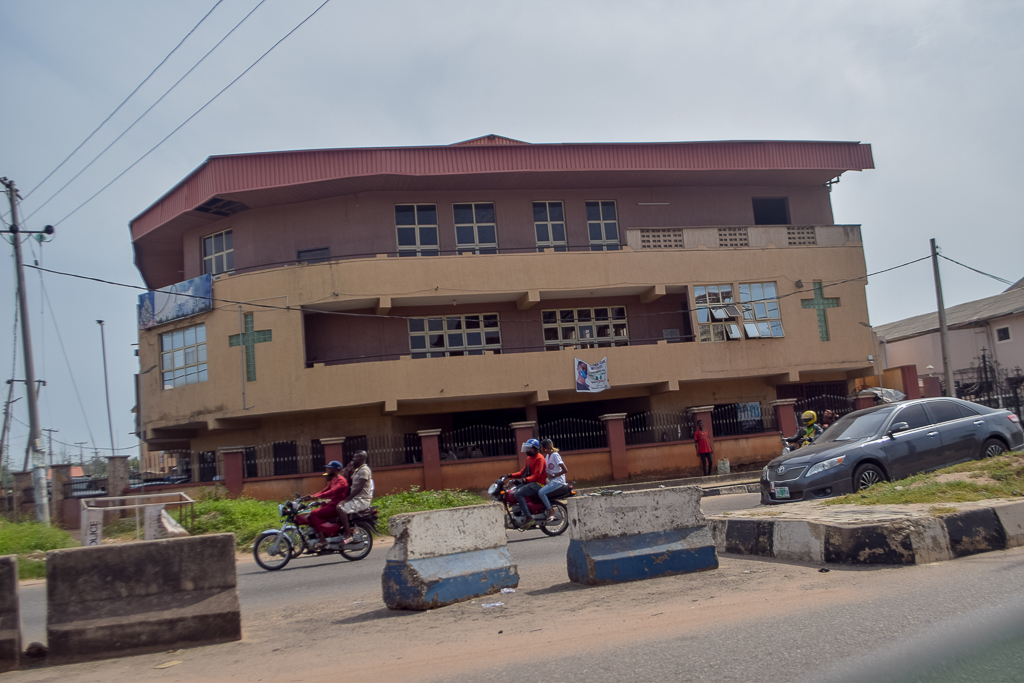
Church Cathedral, Ibara, Abeokuta

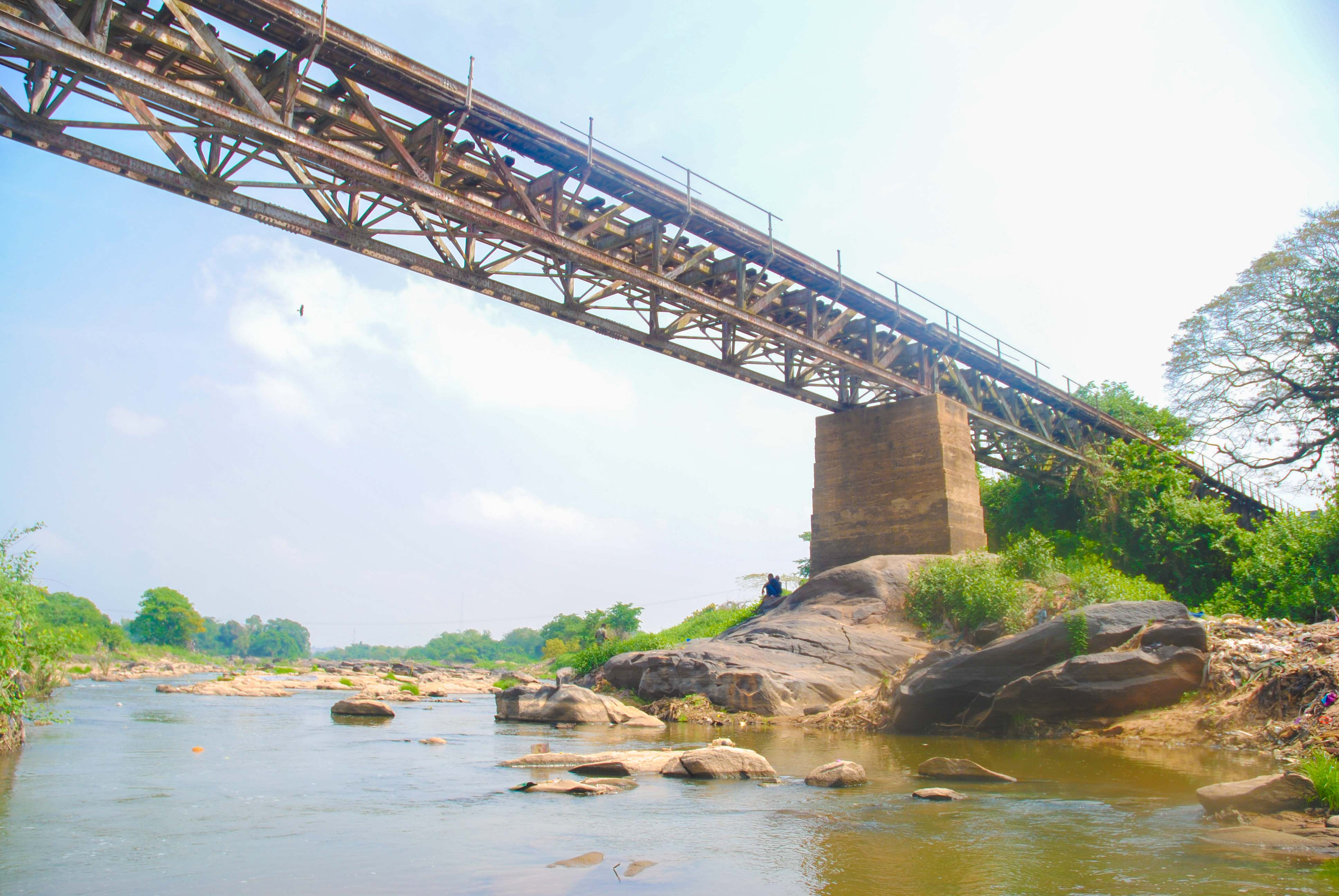
Gada Aro Old Bridge, Abeokuta

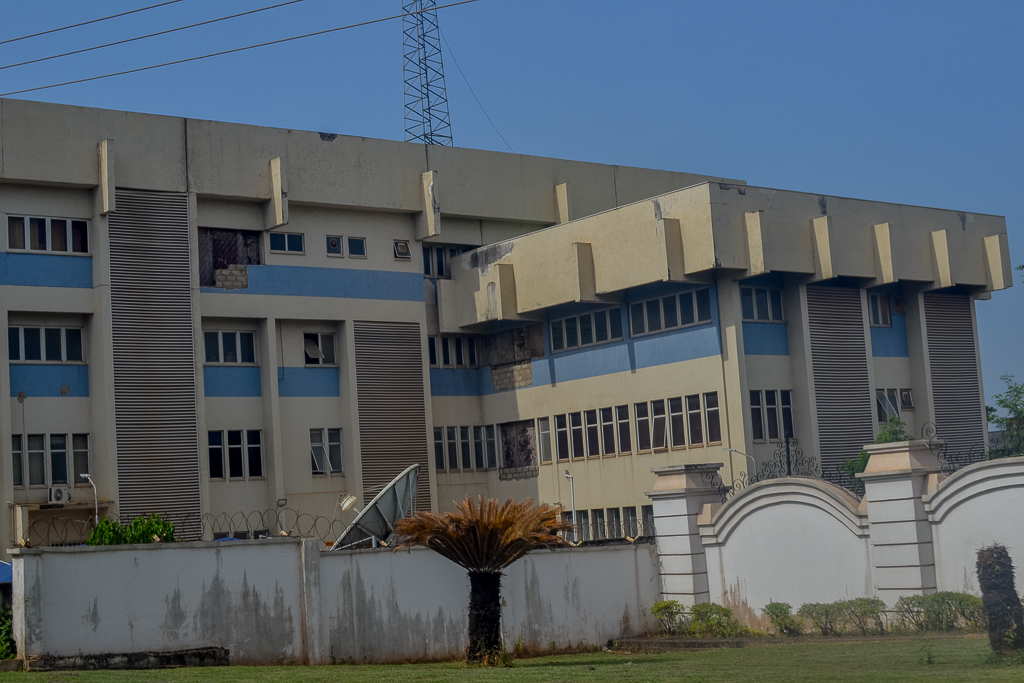
Central Bank of Nigeria, Abeokuta

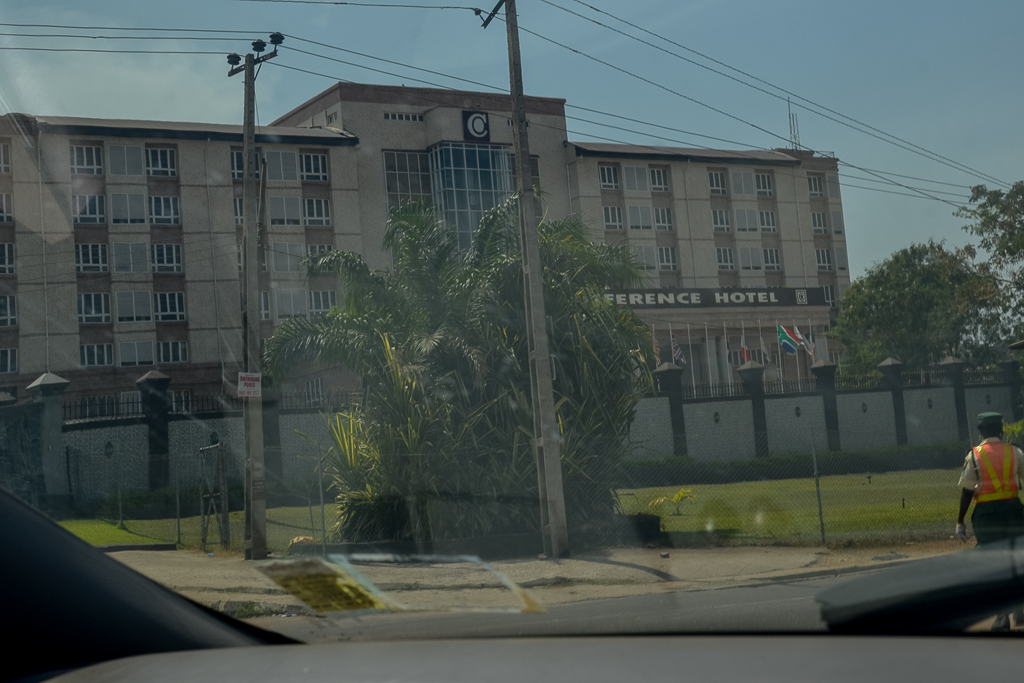
Conference Hotel, Abeokuta

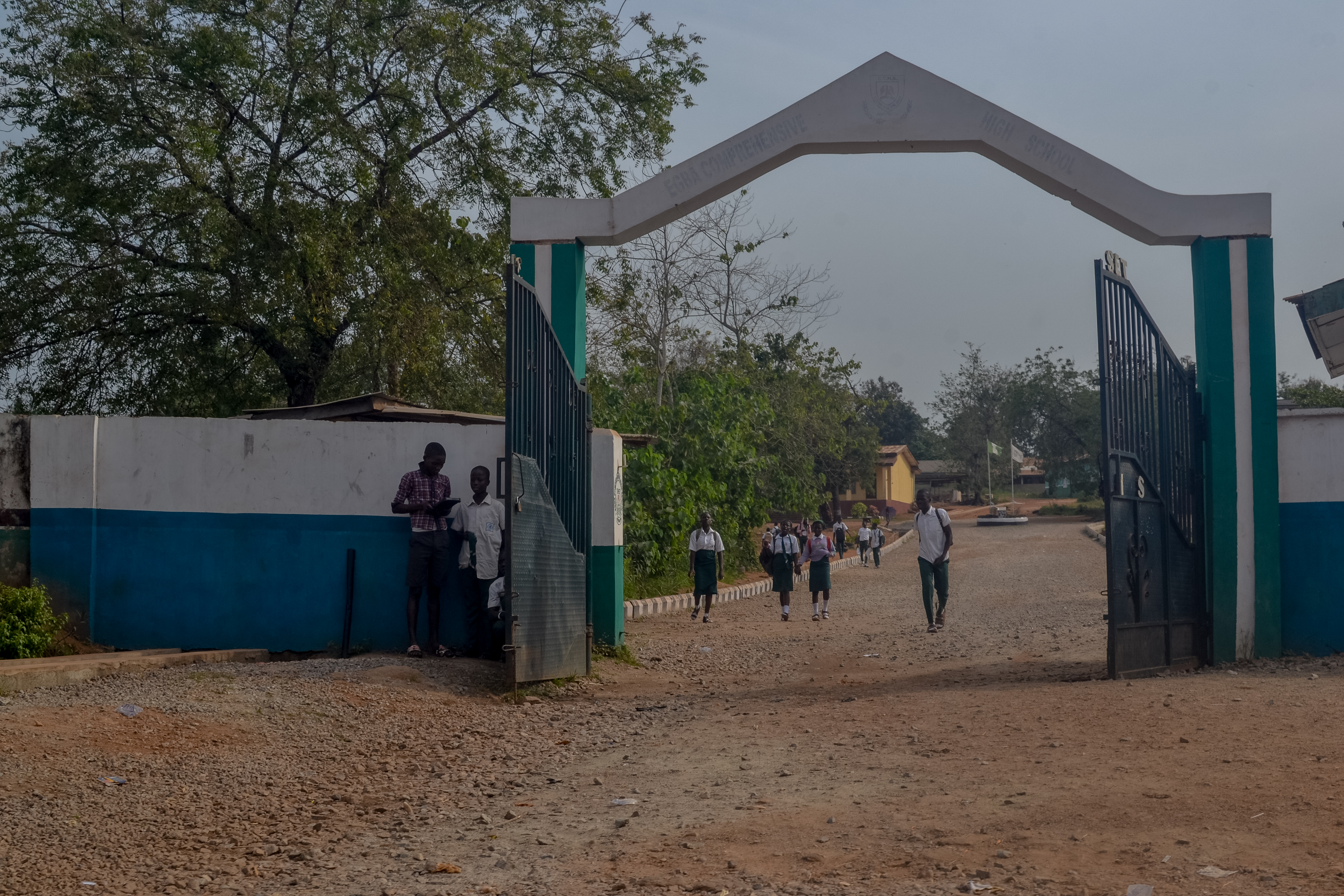
Egba High School, Abeokuta

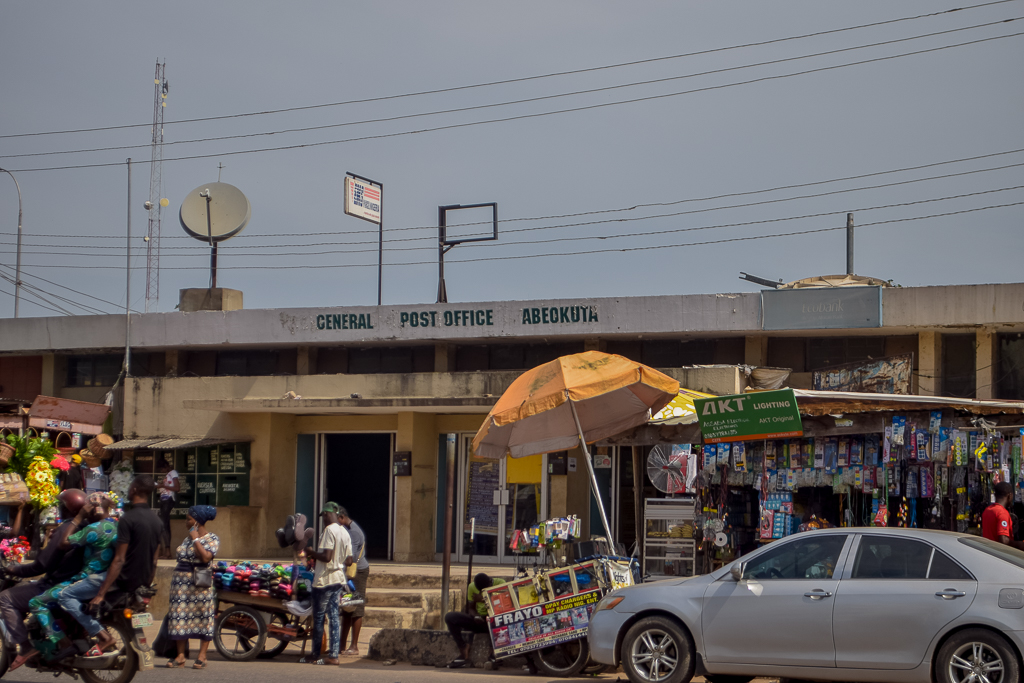
General Post Office, Sapon, Abeokuta.jpg

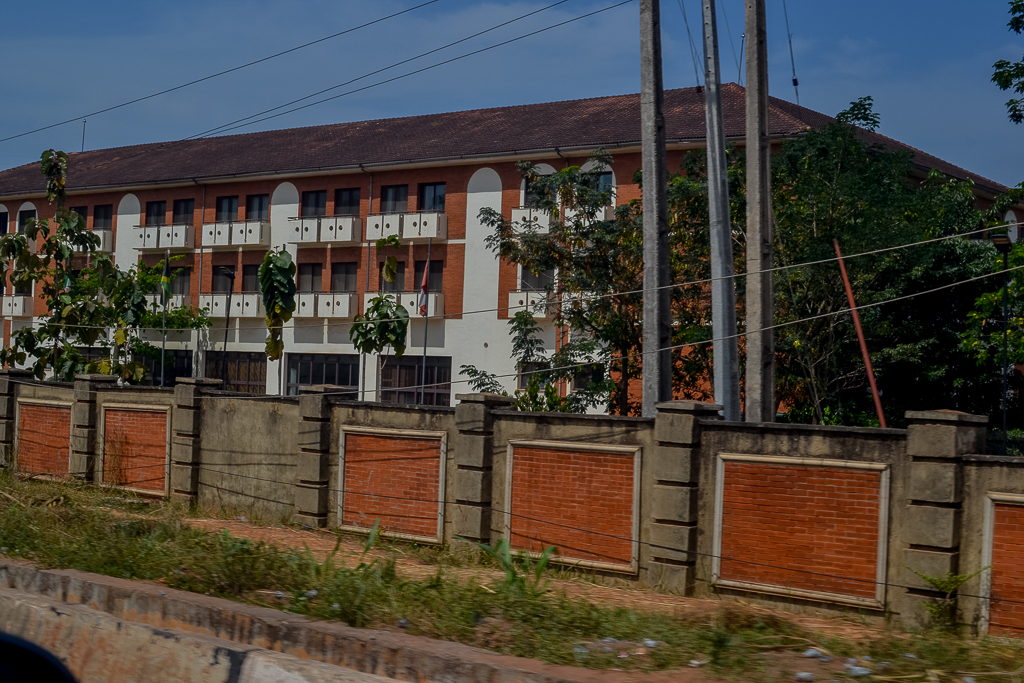
Green Legacy Resort, Oke Mosan, Abeokuta

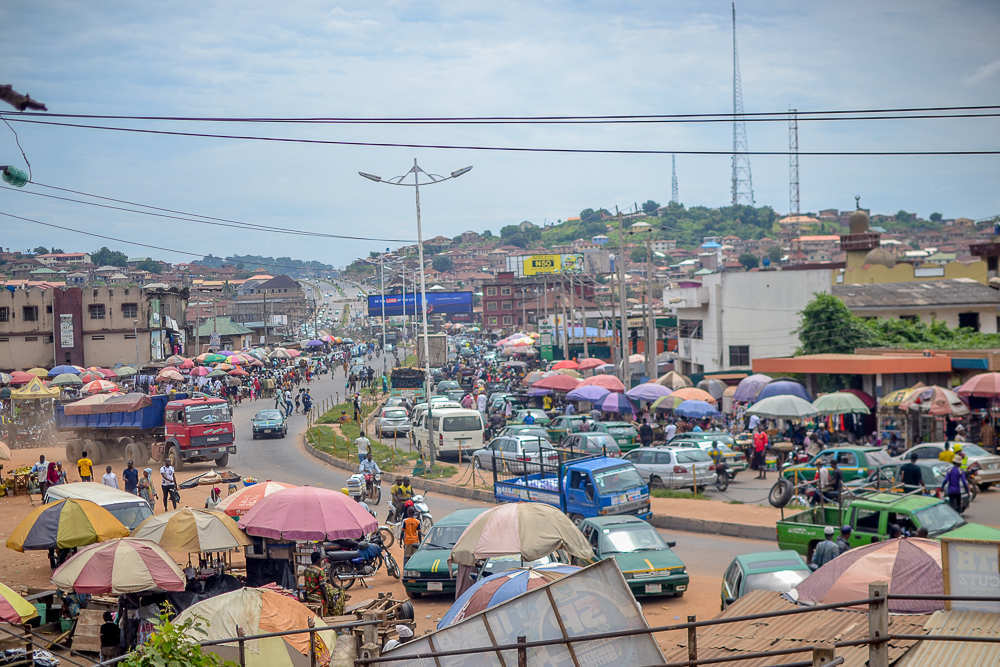
Lafenwa road, Abokuta

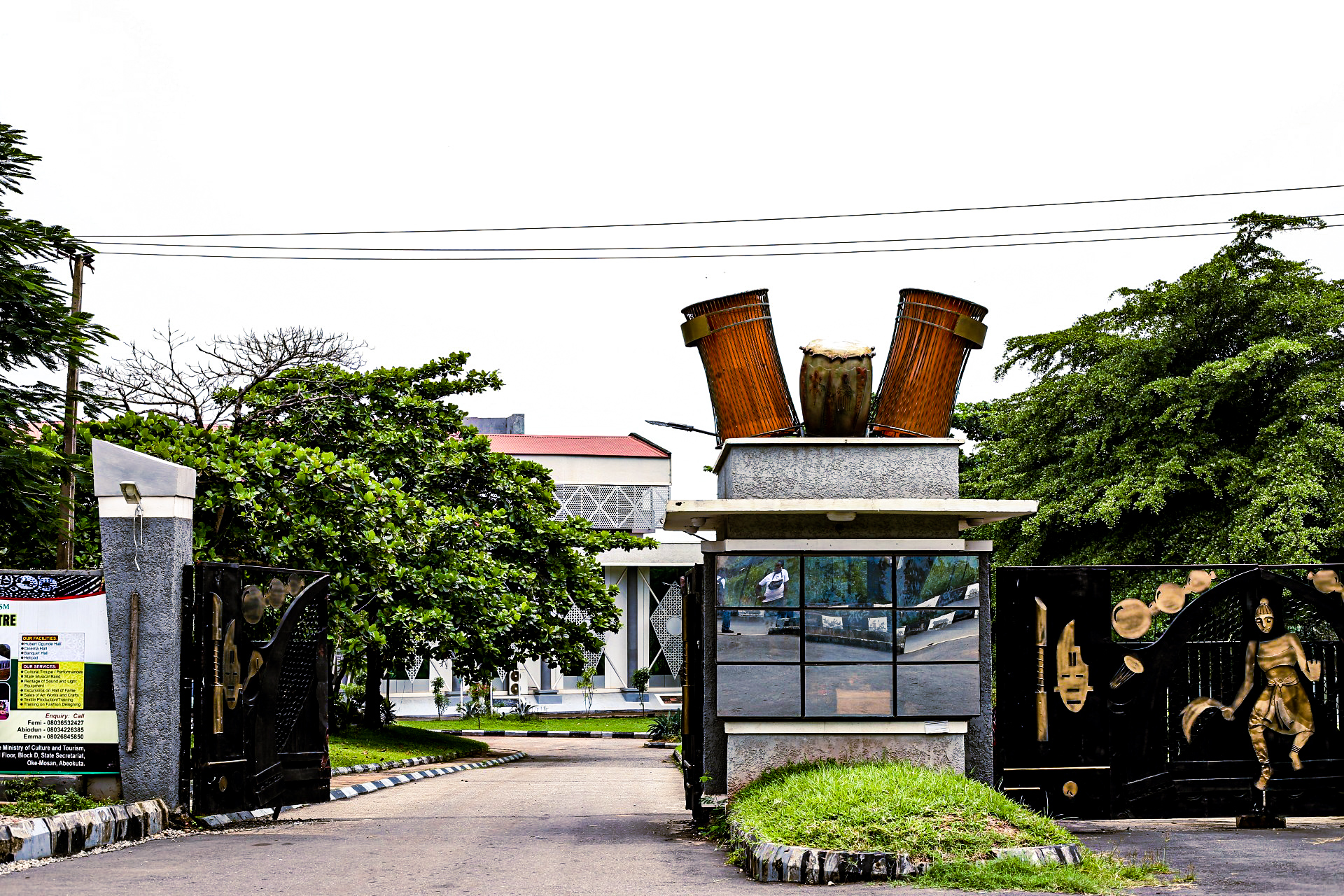
Front Gate of the Kuto Cultural center, Kuto

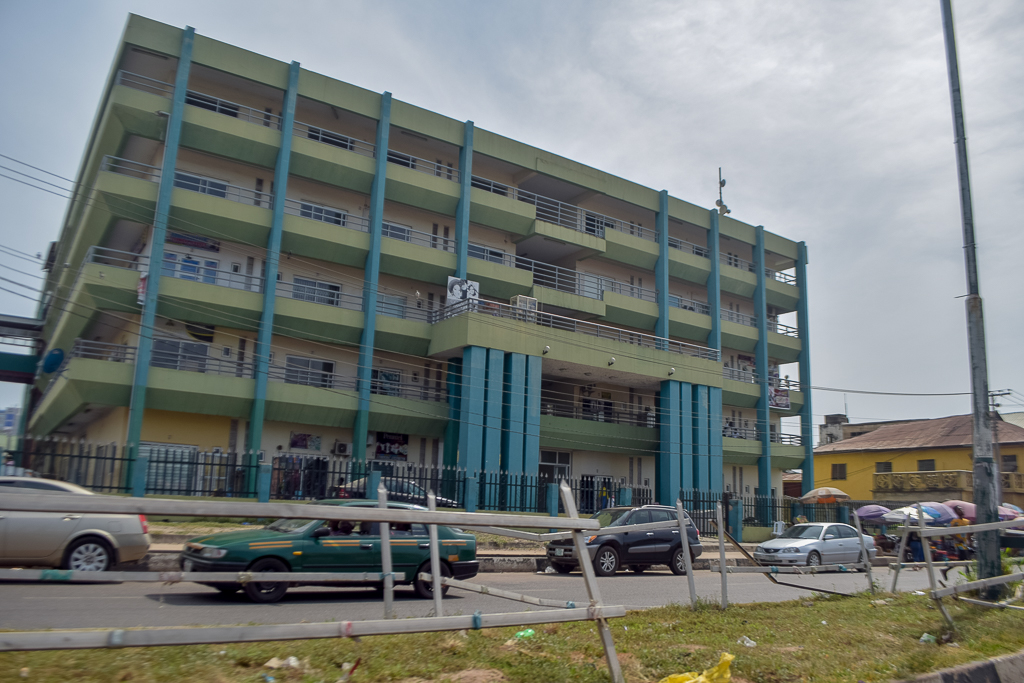
Ibara Market mall, Abeokuta

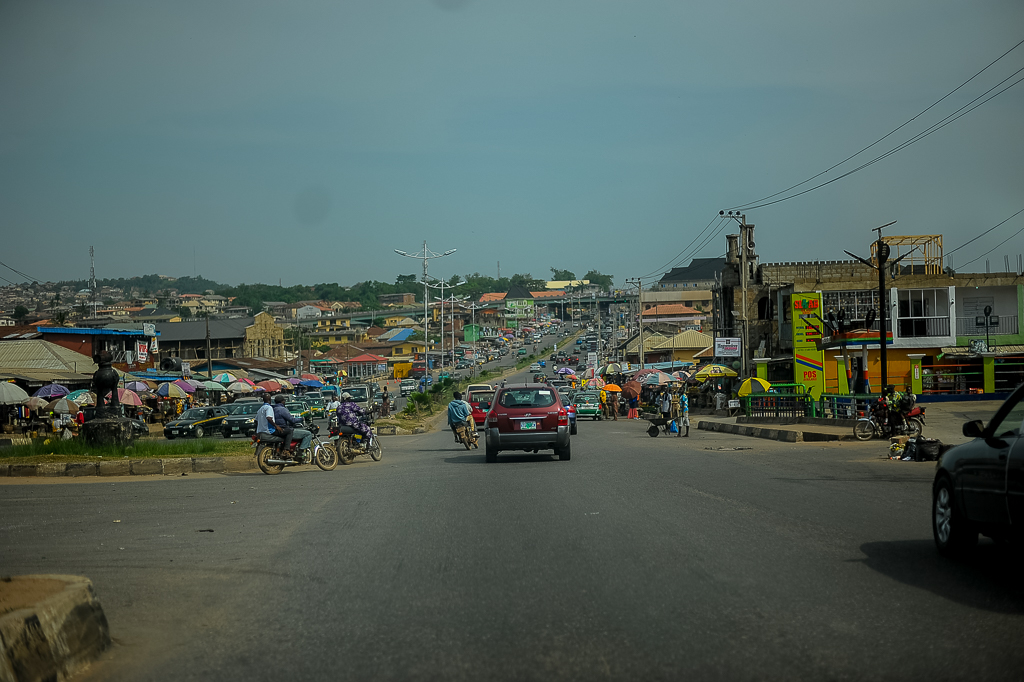
Kuto road, Abeokuta

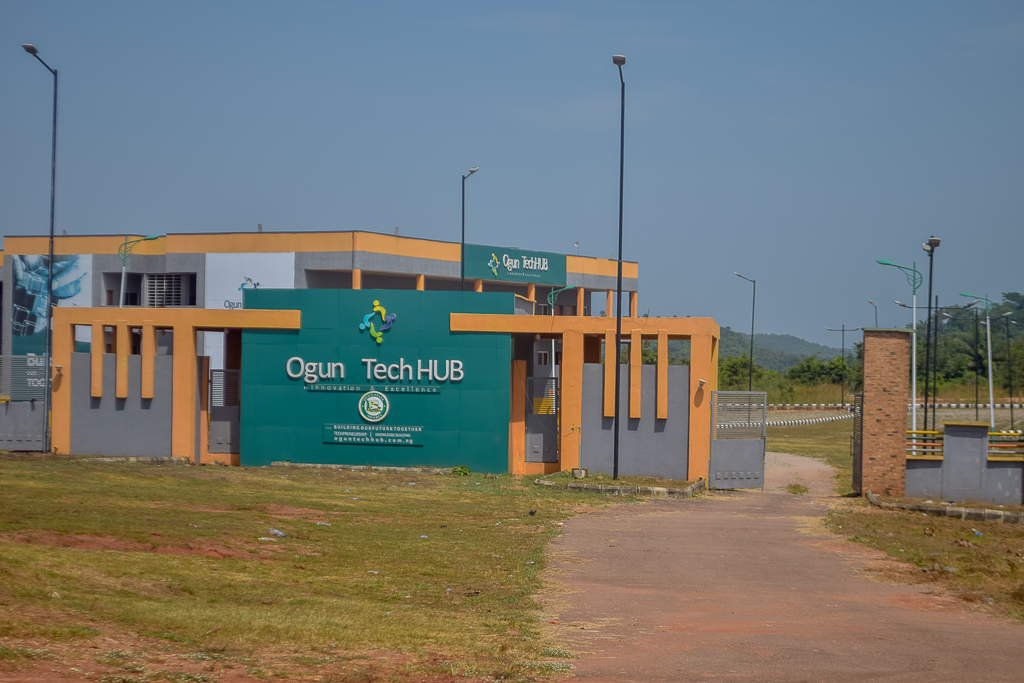
Ogun Tech Hub Development, Abeokuta

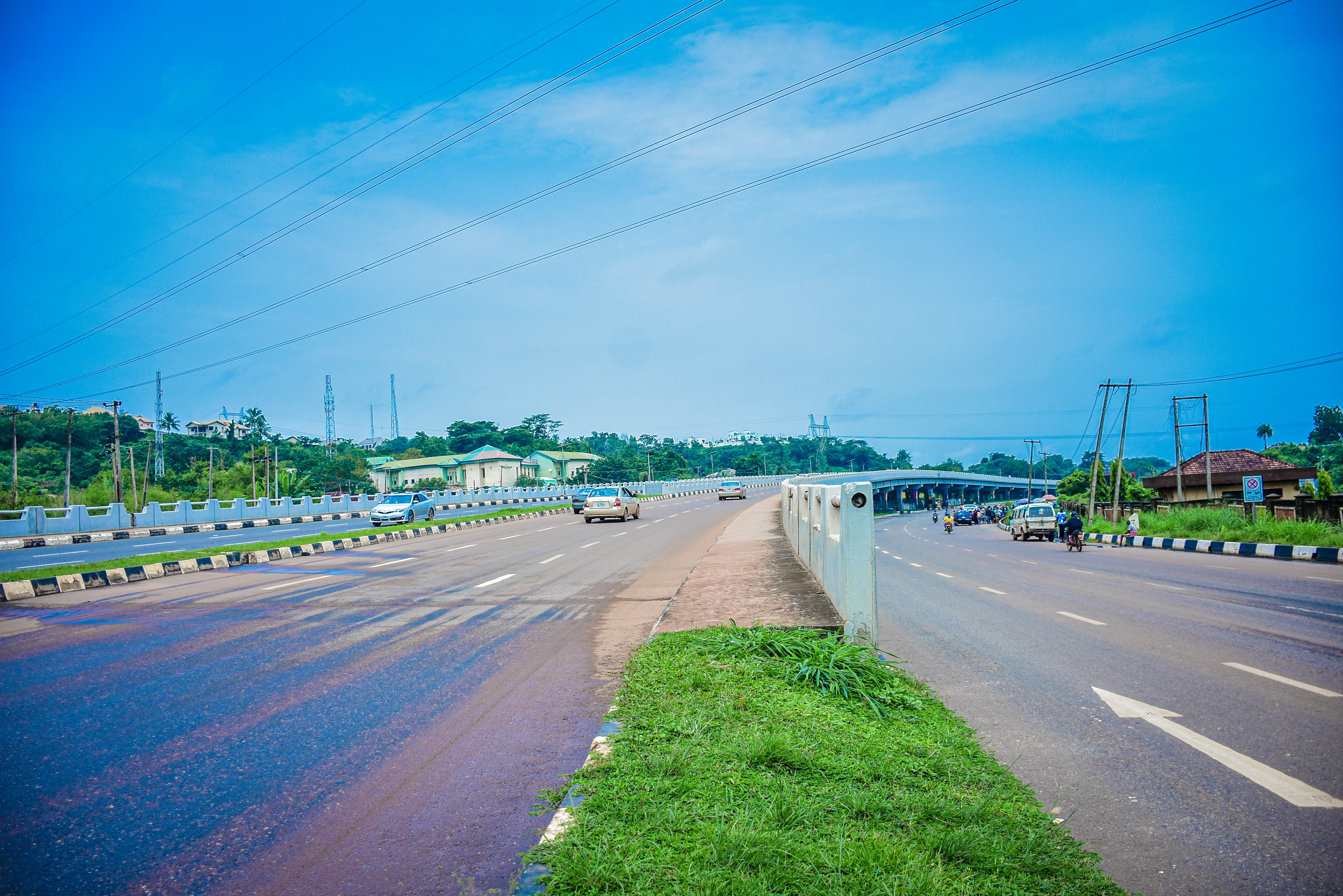
Around The Abeokuta Metropolis

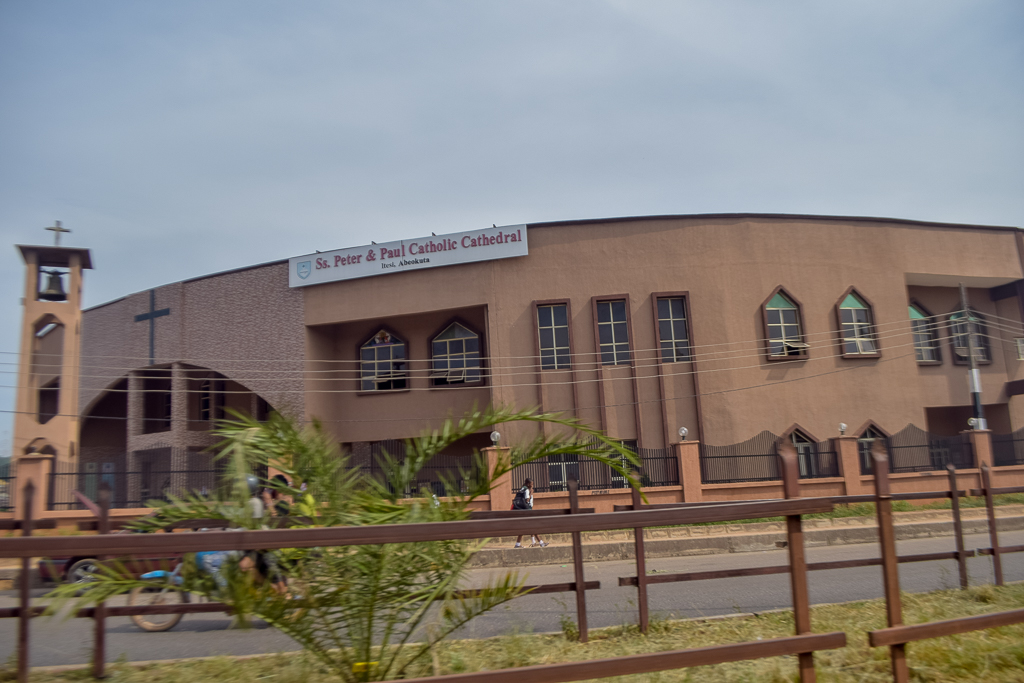
St. Peter & Paul Catholic Church, Abeokuta

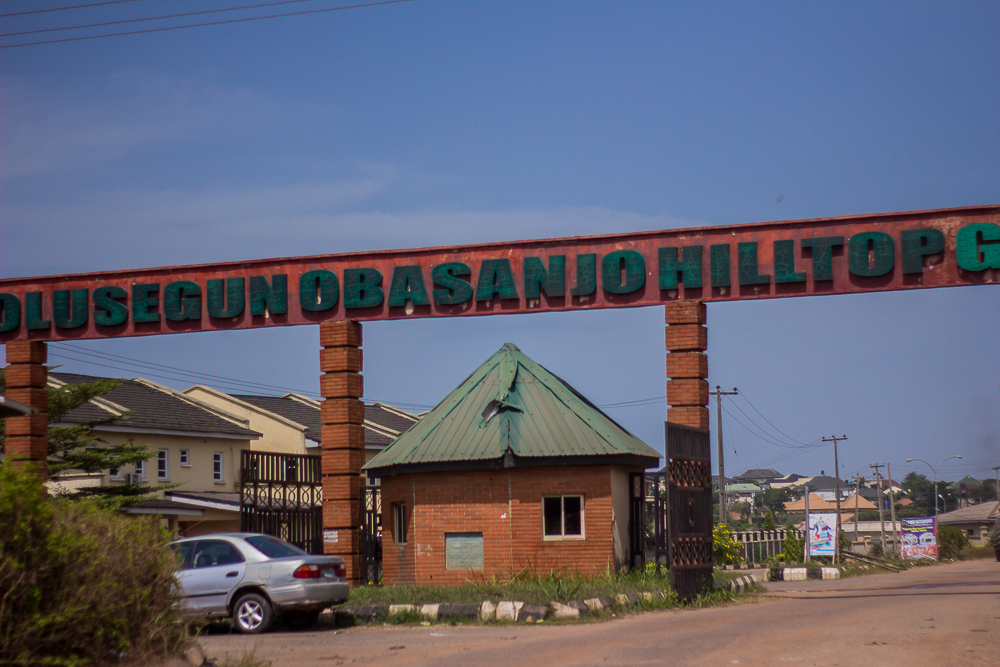
Olusegun Obasanjo hilltop G.R.A, Abeokuta

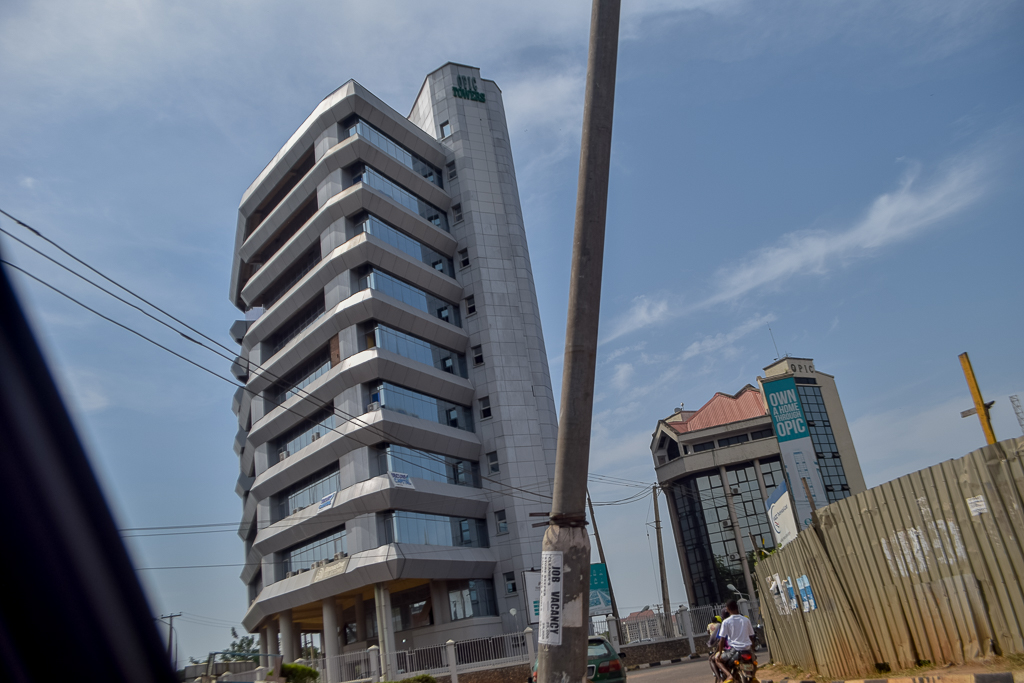
OPIC building, Abeokuta

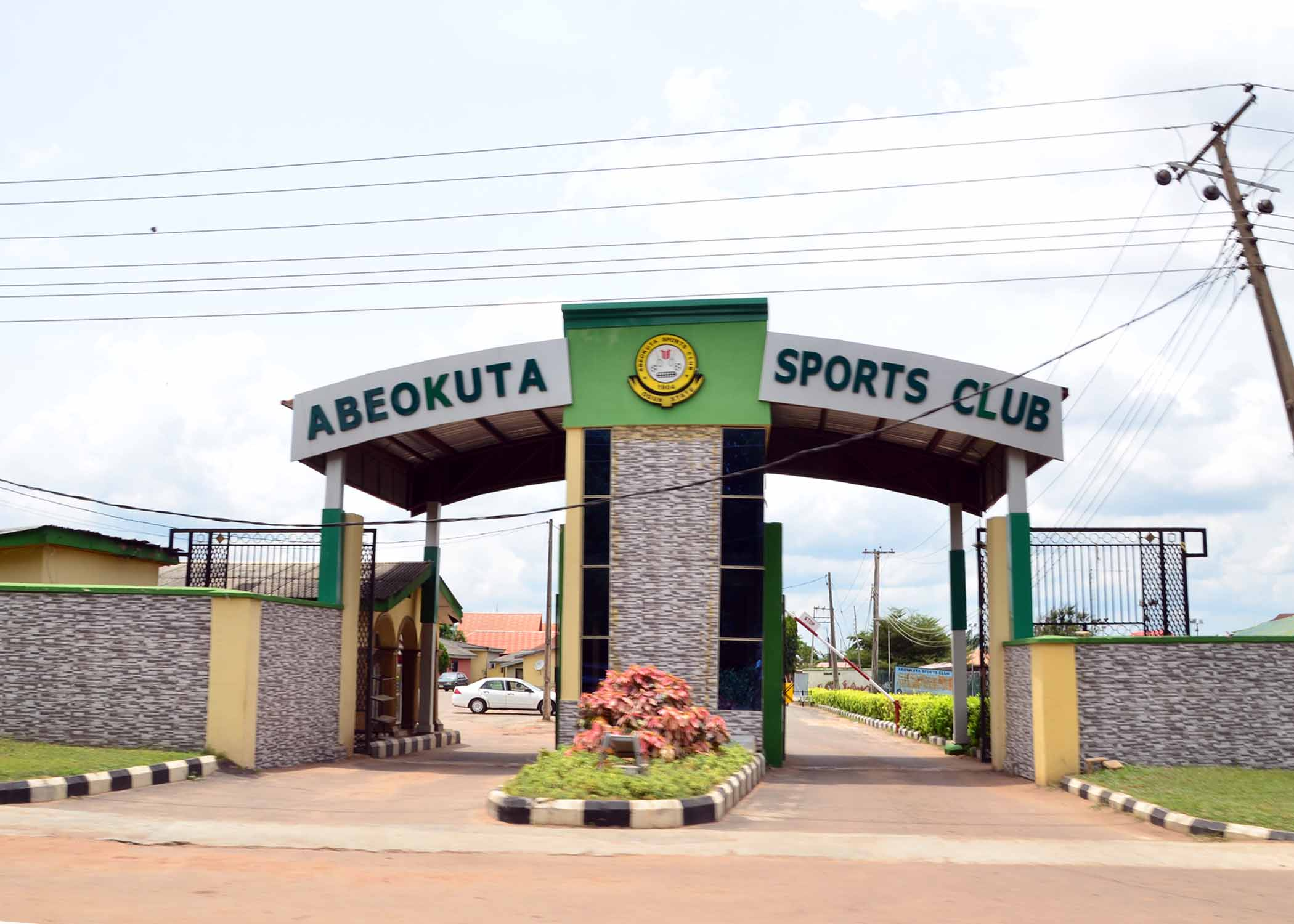
Abeokuta Sport Club, Front Gate

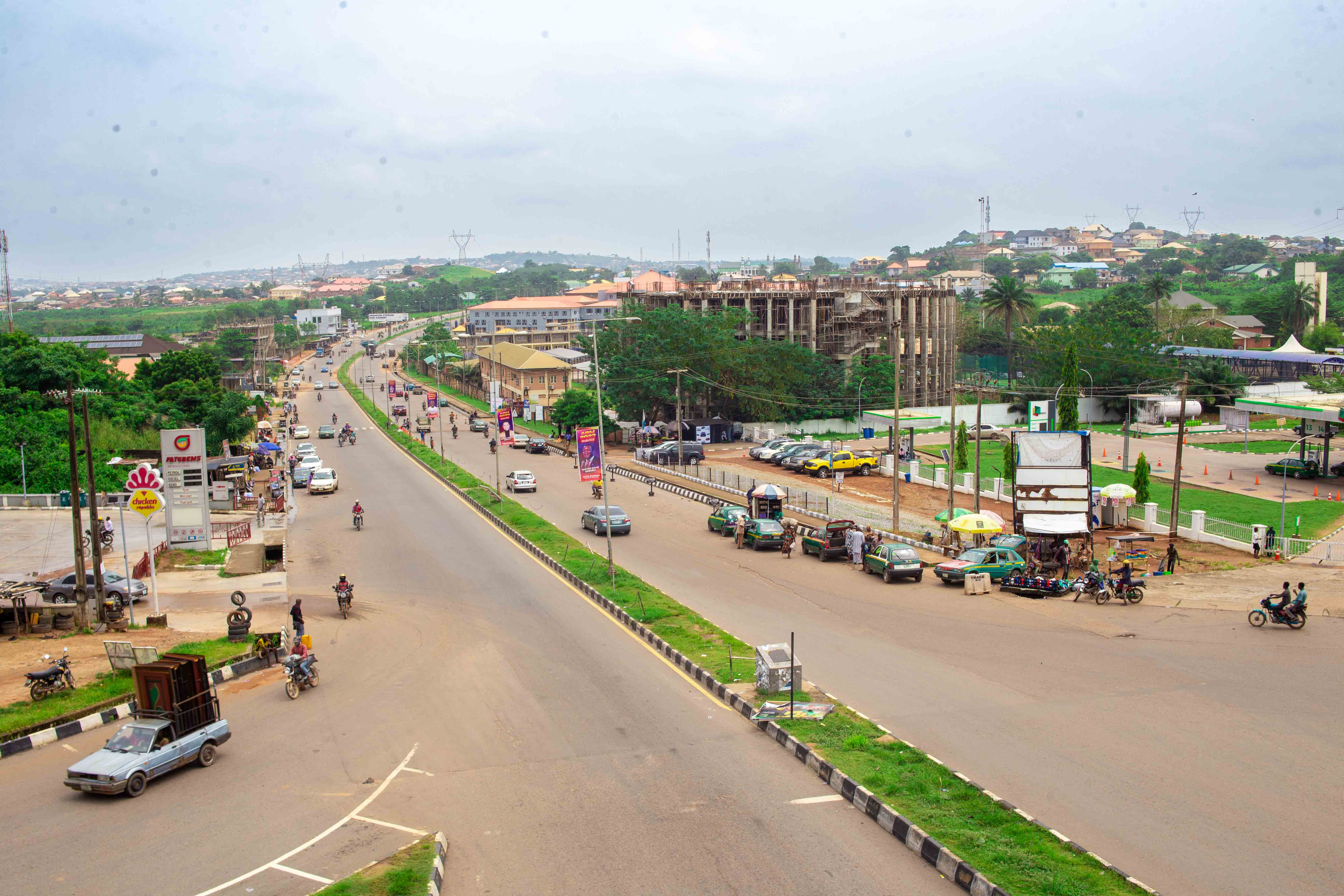
NNPC Road

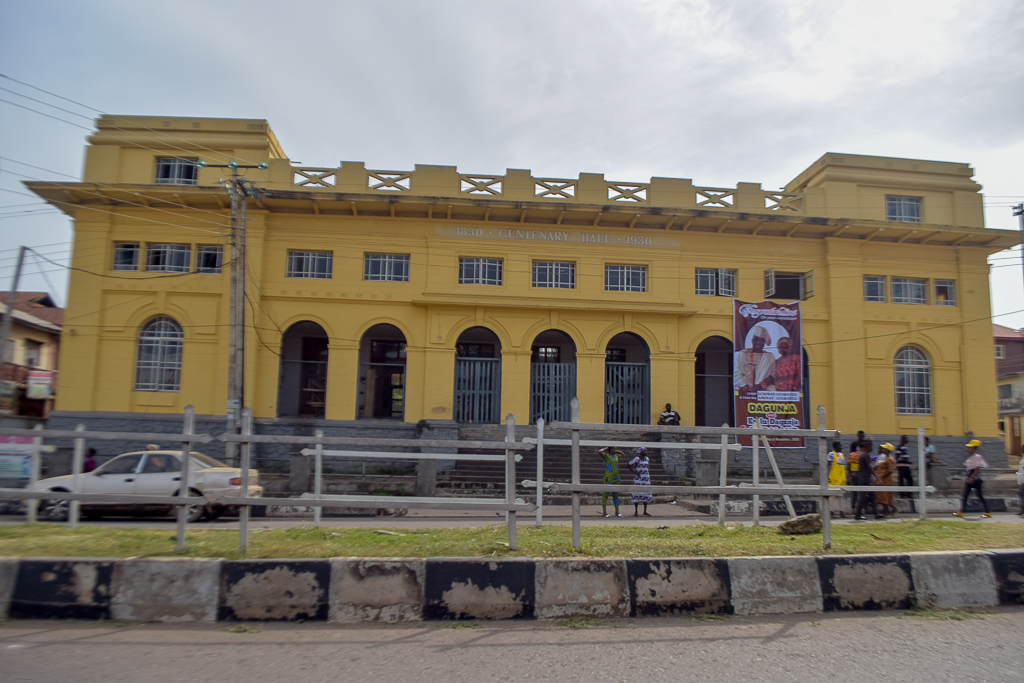
Centenary hall, Abeokuta

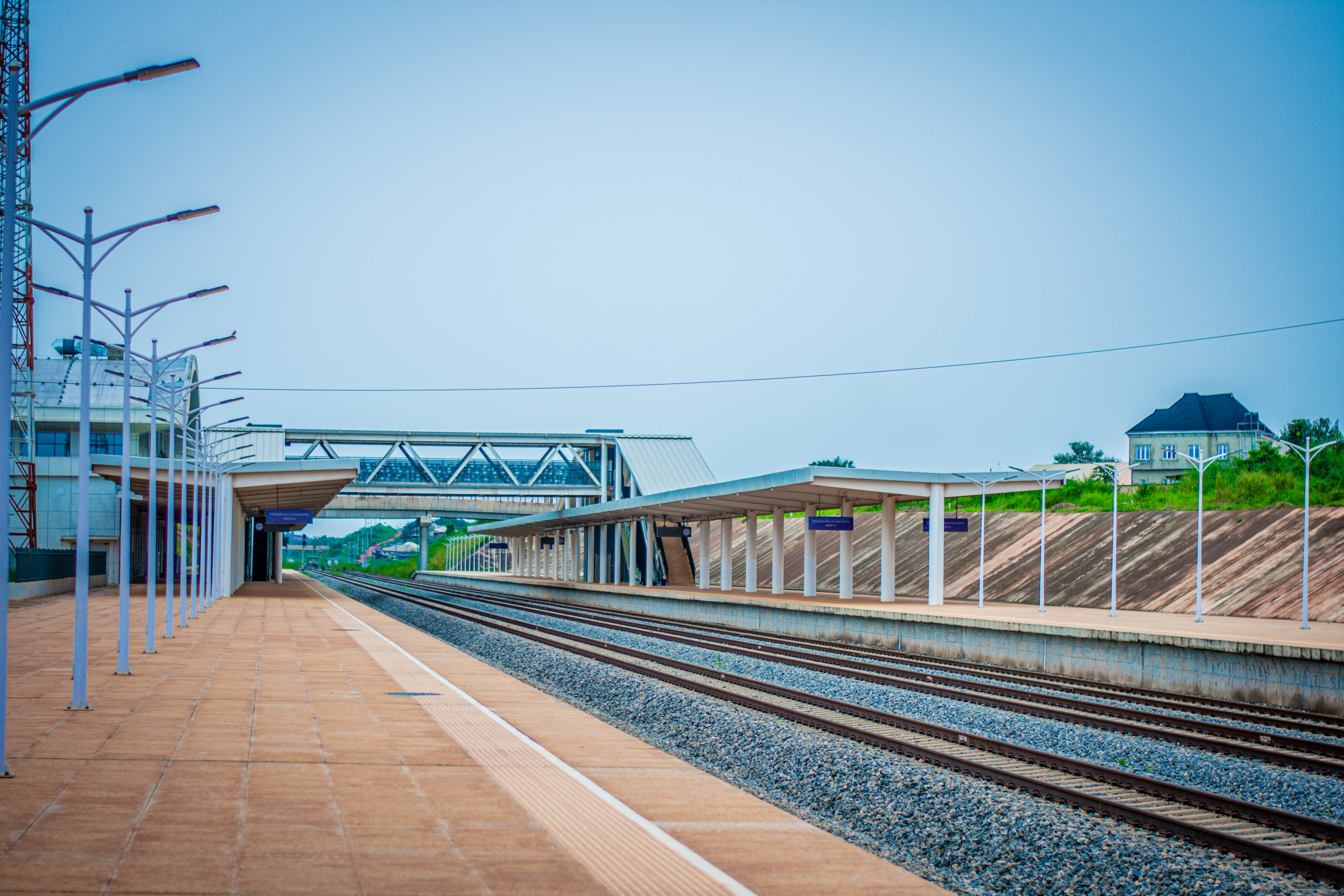
Abeokuta Railway Track

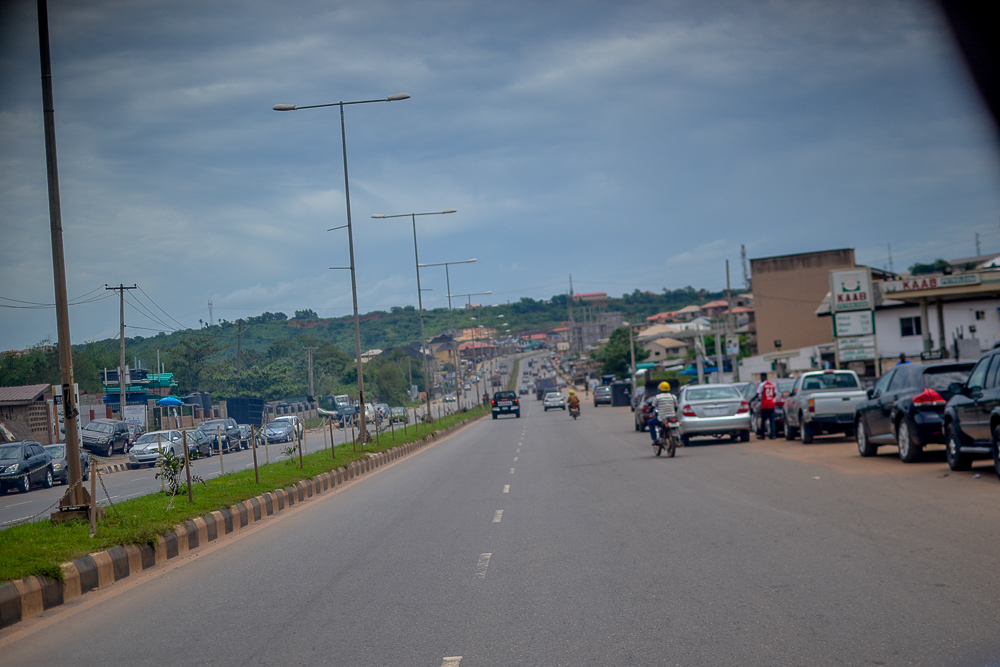
Iyana mortuary bridge, Abeokuta

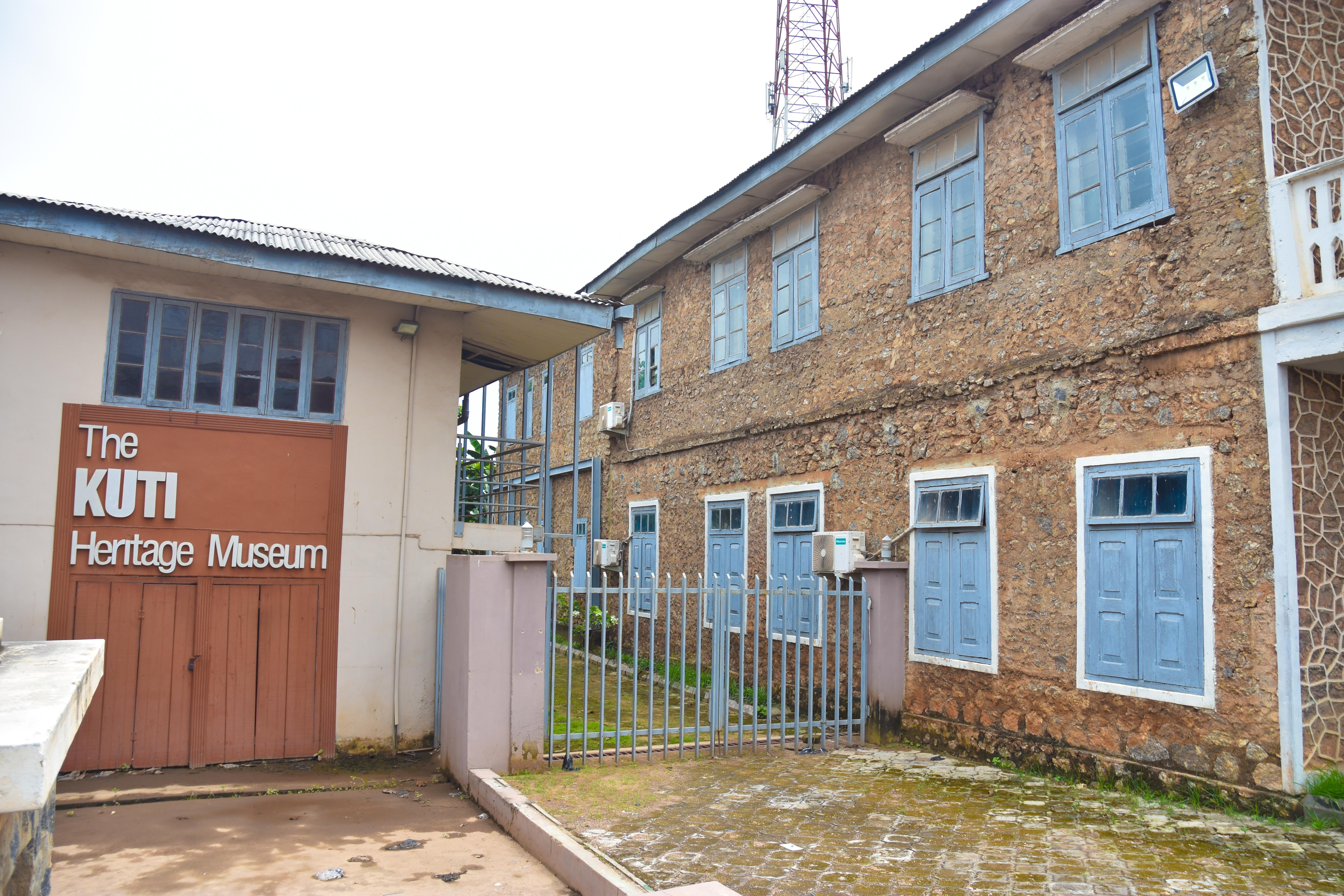
The kuti Heritage Museum

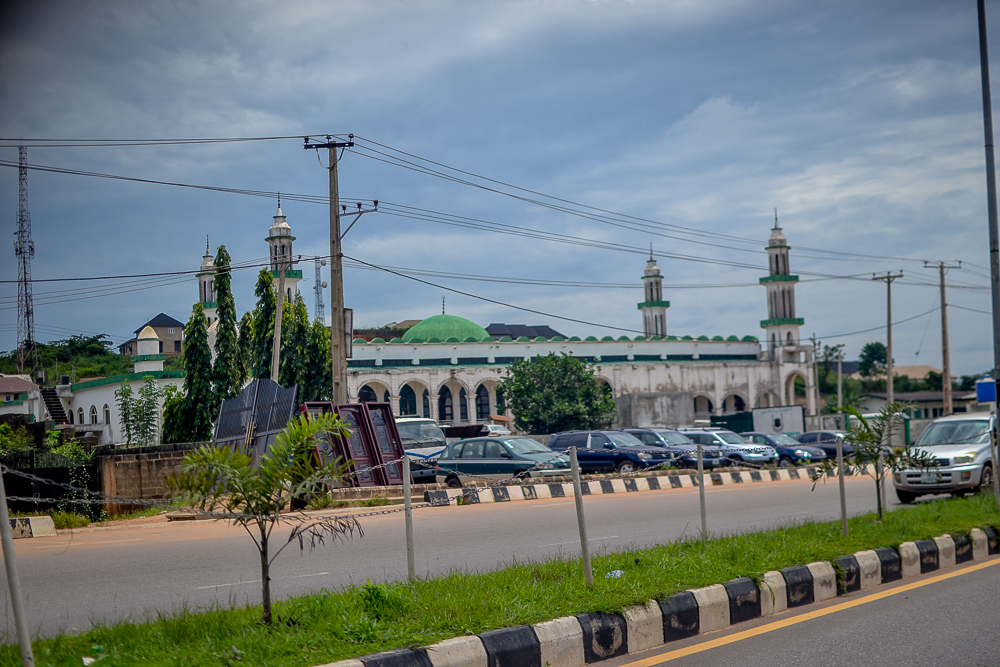
Central mosque, Abeokuta

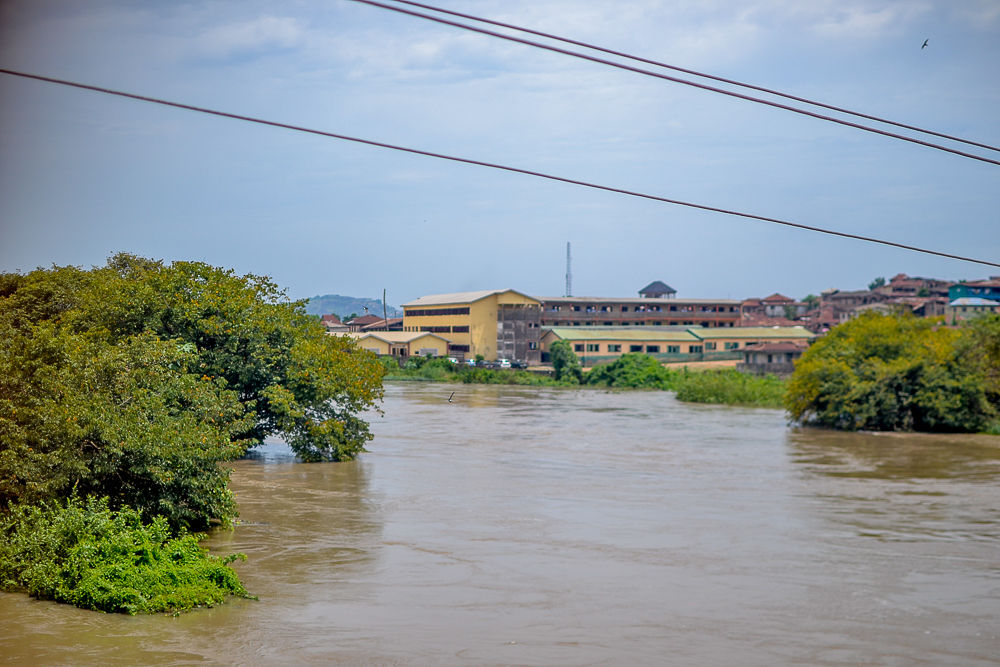
The Ogun river in Abeokuta

== See also ==
- Egba people
- Egba United Government
