= Egba Ake =

Egba Ake Egba Alake
- Traditional state
- Location in Nigeria
- Coordinates: 7°9′39″N 3°20′54″E
- Country: Nigeria
- State: Ogun State

Egba Ake, otherwise known as Egba Alake, is one of the four sections of Egbaland, the others being Oke-Ona, Gbagura, and the Owu (Ibara is often mentioned as another section; this is part of Yewa historically, not Egba, though it is also located in the present-day Abeokuta geographically).

It is a traditional state which joins with its bordering sections to form something of a high kingship. The Alake of Abeokuta, or Alake of Egbaland, is the traditional ruler of the Egba clan of Yoruba in the city of Abeokuta in southwestern Nigeria.

The Egba Ake section is seen by traditionalists as Abeokuta's aristocracy because its principal noblemen, the Omo-Iya-Marun, serve as the kingmakers of the Alake, who must himself also come from this section.

== History ==
House of Egba Alake
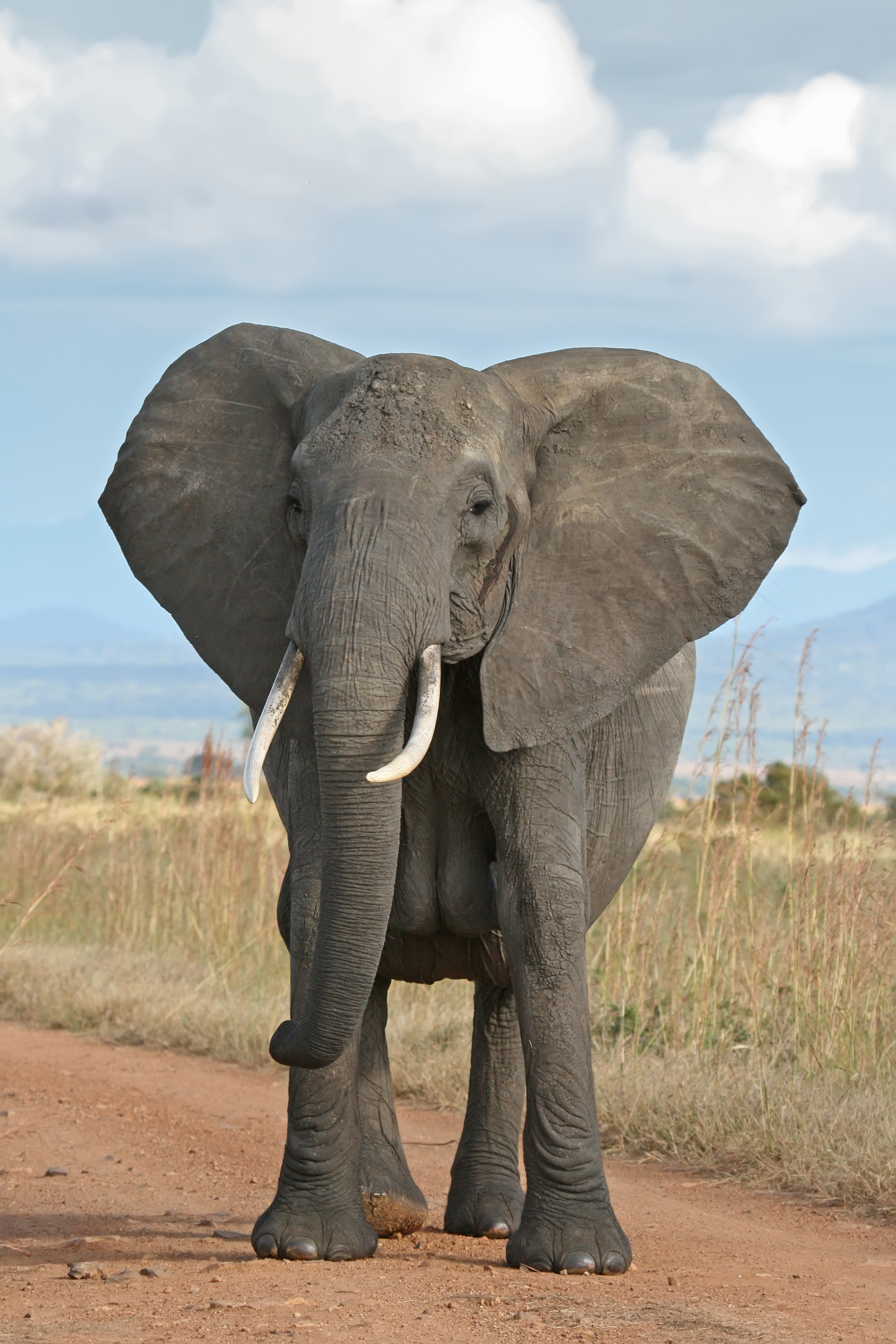
- Nigerian royal dynasty The Elephant, totem of the ancestral line of emperors of Oyo and symbol of Egba Ake royalty
- Parent house: Oodua
- Current region: Yorubaland
- Founded: c.1300 (Orile Egba); 1830 (Abeokuta)
- Founder: Ajalake (Orile Egba); Sagbua Okukenun (Abeokuta)
- Current head: Adedotun Aremu Gbadebo III
- Titles: Oba Alake, Prince of Oyo; Oba Alake of Orile Egba; Oba Alake of Abeokuta; Oba Alake of Egbaland; Oloye of Egbaland; Omoba of Egbaland; Oloori of Egbaland
- Styles: Kabiyesi; Majesty; Royal Highness
- Members: Ladapo Ademola; Adetokunbo Ademola; Yemisi Adedoyin Shyllon
- Connected families: Odunjo family Vaughan family
- Traditions: Ifá; Christianity; Islam
- Motto: Awon Egba, Omo Lisabi (Yoruba for "The Egbas, children of Lisabi")
- Cadet branches: Jibodu; Laarun

The Egba people's original homeland in the Egba forest was established by Yoruba migrants from elsewhere. According to The History of the Yorubas by Samuel Johnson, Eso Ikoyi chiefs in the retinue of the first Alake of the Egba joined him in founding a new community - the confederacy of towns that became known as Orile Egba - in the forest after they left the nascent Oyo empire in around the 13th century AD. Orile Egba continued to exist until its destruction during the Yoruba civil war of the 19th century. As a result, many of the leading families of the Egba Ake claim descent from the Eso Ikoyis today.

Abeokuta was founded as a replacement for Orile Egba in around 1830 by the Egbas after the collapse of the Oyo empire during the civil war. The city was founded because of its strong defensive physical position by refugees trying to protect themselves against slave raiders from Dahomey, who were trying to benefit from the war.

Chief Shodeke, the first paramount chief of Abeokuta and the rest of Egbaland, was a member of the Egba Ake section. Using oral traditions of the Alake's claim to membership of Oduduwa's family being superior to that of any of the other Egba kings to cement the section's position, he is said to have allocated the tracts of land that each of the junior sections settled upon following their arrival in the city. The Egba Ake have been the traditional landowners of Egbaland ever since this event.

In 1832, Abeokuta was involved in war with the people of Ijebu Remo, and in 1834 with the Ibadan people. Sporadic fighting continued with the people of Ota (1842), Ado (1844), Ibarapa (1849), Dahomey (1851), Ijebu-Ere (1851), Ijaye (1860–1862) and the Makun War of 1862–1864.

On 18 January 1893, a treaty was signed with the governor and commander-in-chief of the British Lagos Colony for the purpose of trade; the British recognized Egbaland as an independent state. In 1898, the Egba United Government was formed.

In 1904, an agreement was made where the British assumed jurisdiction in certain legal cases, and in the same year, the Alake Gbadebo paid a state visit to England. Over the following years, the British steadily assumed more responsibility for administration while continuing to formally recognize the Egba state. In 1914, the kingdom was incorporated into the newly amalgamated British Colony and Protectorate of Nigeria.

In 1949, as a result of agitation by the women's rights leader Chief Funmilayo Ransome Kuti, the Alake Ladapo Ademola was forced to abdicate. He later returned to the throne.

== Rulers ==
Solomon's knot, a quasi-heraldic symbol of Yoruba royalty

Rulers of the Egba in Abeokuta, who took the title "Alake" in 1854, were:

Start	End	Ruler
1829	1845	Shodeke
1845	1846	Shomoye -Regent (1st time)
1846	1854	Sagbua Okukenun -Regent
8 Aug 1854	1862	Okukenun (Sagbua Okukenun) First Alake
1862	1868	Shomoye -Regent (2nd time)
28 Nov 1869	20 Dec 1877	Ademola I
Jan 1879	15 Sep 1881	Oyekan (d. 1881)
9 Feb 1885	27 Jan 1889	Oluwajin
18 Sep 1891	11 Jun 1898	Oshokalu
8 Aug 1898	28 May 1920	Gbadebo I (1854–1920)
27 Sep 1920	27 Dec 1962	Ladapo Samuel Ademola II (1872–1962) (in exile 1948 – 3 Dec 1950)
29 Sep 1963	26 Oct 1971	Adeshina Samuel Gbadebo II (1908–1971)
5 Aug 1972	3 Feb 2005	Samuel Oyebade Mofolorunsho Lipede (1915–2005)
24 Aug 2005		Adedotun Aremu Gbadebo III (b. 1943)
