= Yemisi =

Yoruba given name

- Gender: Unisex
- Language: Yoruba

Origin
- Origin: Nigeria
- Meaning: Honour me
- Region of origin: Southwestern Nigeria

Yemisi is a unisex Yoruba given name. It means "honour me" in the Yoruba language.

== Notable people with this name include ==
- Yemisi Adedoyin Shyllon, Nigerian prince
- Yemisi Akinbobola, Nigerian journalist
- Yemisi Aribisala, Nigerian essayist
- Yemisi Edun, Nigerian banker
- Yemisi Odusanya (born 1984), Nigerian blogger
- Yemisi Ogunleye (born 1998), German shot putter
- Olatunji Yemisi (Olufunmilayo), former professional squash player
- Yemisi Ransome-Kuti, Chief Pharmacist for the Federation of Nigeria

== Places with Yemisi ==
- Yemisi Shyllon Museum of Art
