= Yemisi Adedoyin Shyllon =

Nigerian royal

Omoba Yemisi Adedoyin Shyllon
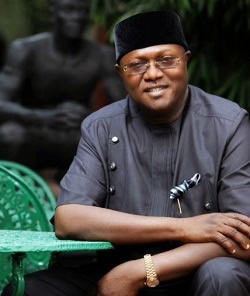
- Organization: Oyasaf
- Spouse: Oloori Funmilayo Shyllon

Yemisi Adedoyin Shyllon is a prince of Ake in Abeokuta, Ogun State, Nigeria. He hails from the Sogbulu and Ogunfayo lineage of the Laarun ruling house of Ake in Egbaland.

== Education and career ==
He studied engineering at the University of Ibadan, law at the University of Lagos, the Nigeria Law School, and earned his MBA from University of Ife. (Note: The University of Ife is now called Obafemi Awolowo University)He also holds an honorary Doctor of Letters degree (D.Litt.), of the University of Port-Harcourt, Nigeria.

Joining as sales engineer after graduating from the university, he became the marketing manager with Tractor and Equipment (a division of UACN) from where he was appointed into the board of Nigerite Limited (Note: Nigerite Limited is a subsidiary of Etex Group) as the marketing director. He also served as legal adviser to the company. Within his years as executive director of Nigerite Ltd, he served as chairman of Ogun State radio and television stations, where he left some significant landmarks at establishing Nigeria's first state owned FM radio station (OGBC FM Stereo). He was also at different times, the chairman of Ogun State Investment Corporation and Gateway Tourism Corporation. Notably as chairman of Gateway Tourism Corporation, his board facilitated the redevelopment of the Olumo Rock into its current state as a major tourism site in Nigeria.

He served as a member of the 1989/90 UNIDO sponsored strategic industrial development committee for Nigeria under, Chief Rasheed Gbadamosi as chairman, that fashioned out some strategic economic development plans for Nigeria and was also a member of the 1994 Chief Chris Ogunbanjo led committee for fashioning out a development plan for Ogun state of Nigeria. He has served as member of the transition committees of incoming governments of Lagos state (1999) and Ogun State (2003) for fashioning out working blueprints for their incoming administrations.

Omoba Shyllon is currently a non-executive director of the Golden Tulip Hotel, Festac, among others. He combines his boardroom, law practice and management engagements with a committed devotion to showcasing and promoting Nigerian art and culture to the world and has served as a member of the National Heritage Council and Endowment for the Arts in Nigeria. He is currently establishing Nigeria's first privately funded public museum for the benefit of Nigeria, at the Pan-Atlantic University in Ibeju, Lekki, Lagos, Nigeria, which construction is at its finishing stage.

He financed the establishment of the First Privately Funded University Museum of Art in Nigeria, and he gave a grant of one thousand (1000) of his artworks to the Yemisi Shyllon Museum of Art at the Pan-Atlantic University, in Lagos. He serves as the Grand Donor and chairman of the museum supervisory council of the museum of the private University in Nigeria. His donated artworks, forms the main exhibit of the museum.

== Art collections ==
The Omoba is currently Nigeria's largest private art collector, with over 7,000 artworks of sculptures, paintings and other media, as well as over 55,000 photographic shots of Nigeria's cultural festivals.

The art works in his collection are dated from as early as the 9th century and as late as the 21st century. They include the works of both early and later Nigerian artists, such as Aina Onabolu, Akinola Lasekan, Ben Enwonwu, Okaybulu Eke, Nike Davis-Okundaye, Charles Shainumi, Okpu Eze, Clary Nelson Cole, Kolade Osinowo, David Dale, Simon Okeke, Isiaka Osunde, Abayomi Barber, Olu Amoda, El Anatsui, Ben Osawe, Bruce Onobrakpeya, Lara Ige-Jacks, Susanne Wenger, Theresa Akinwale, Uzo Egonu, Jimoh Akolo, Lamidi Fakeye, Uche Okeke, Erhabor Emopkae, Kunle Filani, Tola Wewe, Yusuf Grillo, Adeola Balogun, Olawunmi Banjo and Oresegun Olumide.

His collection also includes art from other African Countries like Senegal, Cameroon, Togo, Ghana and South Africa. Paintings of artists from other continents such as Salvador Dalí and Simon Bull are also housed in his collection.

His interest in art and culture dates back to his days as an undergraduate in the late 1970s at the University of Ibadan, as he revealed to CNN. Omoba Shyllon told Vanguard newspaper in a news report that art collection is his obsession. In another interview with Conceptual Art magazine, where he spoke about his life as an art collector, he said: "It goes from interest to passion and passion to obsession until you are buying artwork at every auction and you have to build new storage spaces just to house your art collection."

Omoba Yemisi Shyllon is ranked among the World's top 100 art collectors and was the largest collector in Africa in 2016. He has made presentations about African art and culture at art fairs in different parts of the world.

=== OYASAF ===
Oyasaf is a non-profit organisation established in 2007 to promote the appreciation and study of Nigerian arts and artists, both in Nigeria and internationally.

The art foundation regularly organizes; art exhibitions and public lectures on art and culture. OYASAF sponsors an annual art entrepreneurship workshop with the University of Lagos for artists and non-artists in Nigeria.

In June 2016, "The Yemisi Shyllon Professorial Chair" for fine art and design sponsored a one-week exhibition of the over 2000-year-old Chinese sculptures and photo diary of the Qin dynasty, in Lagos, Nigeria.

The foundation annually sponsors scholars, curators and art historians from outside Nigeria to visit and study Omoba Yemisi Shyllon's collection, interact with Nigerian artists and promote research into Nigerian culture through this.

So far, the art foundation has sponsored 17 fellows from the US, Kenya, South Africa, Ghana, Germany, Switzerland and Austria. Previous beneficiaries of the fellowship programme are from the following institutions: University of Chicago (US), University of Wisconsin (US), Stanford University (US), University of Vienna (Austria), Rhodes University (South Africa), Museum of Cape Town (South Africa), Columbia University (US).

OYASAF has donated some life size sculptural monuments to public places and institutions in Nigeria, notable among which are the 18 life-sized sculptural works of art at the Freedom Park in Lagos and monuments at the University of Lagos and University of Ibadan.

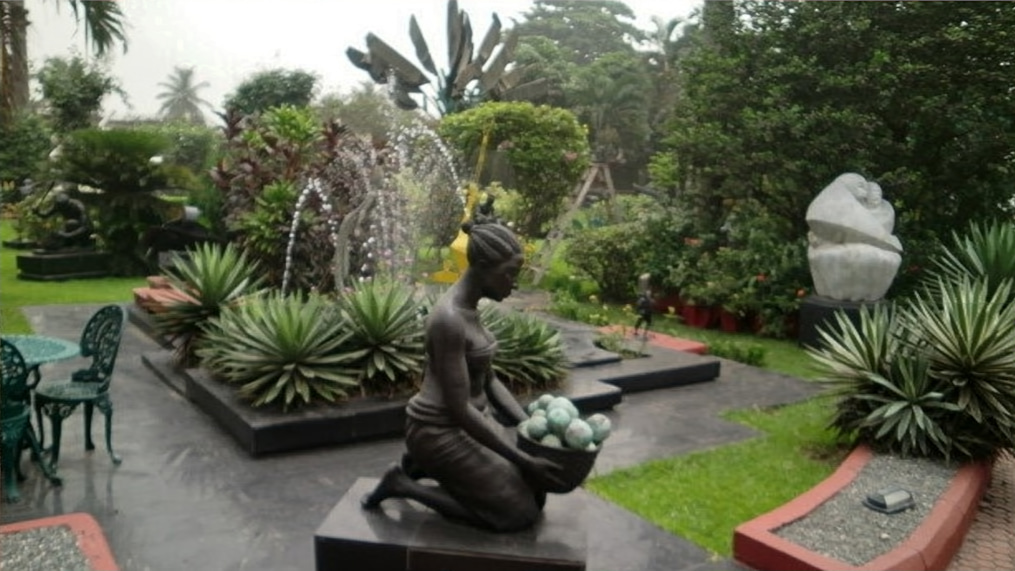
OYASAF Garden

The foundation has two books publications to its credit. A book published in 2008 titled Yoruba Traditional Art: The Collection of Omooba Yemisi Adedoyin Shyllon Art Foundation (OYASAF) is a catalogue with information on the history of the Yoruba; origin, evolution, and elements of Yoruba art; major traditional Yoruban artists; and a map of the Yoruba kingdom. The book was co-authored by the Omoba and Onuoha Louisa, and edited by Dr. Pogoson Ohioma.

OYASAF is the sponsor of the on-line journal of African art, The OYASAF Journal of Art (TOJA), for intellectual discussion of African art.

== Professional membership ==
Omoba Yemisi Adedoyin Shyllon is a member of the Nigerian Bar Association and a fellow of professional bodies like the National Institute of Marketing of Nigeria, Institute of Directors Nigeria, Nigerian Institute of Management, Chartered Institute of Stock Brokers, Nigerian Society of Engineers and the Chartered Institute of Marketing of the United Kingdom. He is also a board member of the University of Ibadan Advancement Center and others, including patron of visual art within and outside Nigeria

== Awards and honours ==
Omoba Shyllon holds an honorary Doctor of Letters degree from the University of Port Harcourt, Nigeria.

He has received numerous awards, notable among which are:

- Art Expo award for Collector of the year by Art Gallery Owners Association of Nigeria.
- Peace and Dialogue Award 2014 by UFUK Dialogue Foundation.
- Yessiey Award

== Personal life ==
He is married to Oloori Funmilayo Shyllon.
