= Tola Wewe =

Nigerian artist

- Born: 1959 (age 66–67); Okitipupa, Nigeria
- Occupation: Artist

Tola Wewe (born 1959) is a Nigerian artist.

== Early life and education ==
Wewe was born in Okitipupa, Ondo State in 1959. In 1983 Wewe graduated with a Bachelor of Arts degree from the department of Fine Art from the University of Ife (now Obafemi Awolowo University). He got a Master of Arts degree in African Visual Arts from the University of Ibadan in 1986.

== Career and art style ==
Wewe taught fine art at the Teachers College Igboegunrin in Ondo, lectured at Adeyemi College of Education, Ondo, was a senior artist at the Daily Times of Nigeria, and the general manager of the Signature Art Gallery in Lagos before becoming a full-time practicing artist in 1995.

Wewe's works draw inspiration from his master's research on the Ijaw water spirit mask and the traditional Yoruba society, folklore and mythology. He is a part of Ona movement, a group of artists, scholars and critics committed to the exploration, interpretation and adaptation of traditional Yoruba symbols, motifs and concepts.

He is frequent collaborator with Nike Davies-Okundaye. Gbolahan Ayoola worked as Wewe's studio apprentice. In Prof. Moyo Okediji published a 149-page book, "Metamodern Vision of Tola Wewe" to commemorate Wewe's work. Wewe's work is also part of the art collection owned by Nigeria's largest private art collector Yemisi Adedoyin Shyllon.

== Iye Boabo ==
In 1989, Tola Wewe's painting titled "Iye Boabo" was stolen along with other works from the apartment of fellow artist Moyo Okediji at Obafemi Awolowo University, Ile-Ife. The stolen artworks included pieces by Kunle Filani and Tunde Nasiru. The theft went unnoticed for years due to limited communication means at the time.

In 2018, "Iye Boabo" resurfaced when Arthouse, a prominent art auction house in Lagos, contacted Wewe to authenticate the painting for an upcoming auction. Upon recognizing his work, Wewe expressed a desire to know the identity of the collector who submitted the painting to potentially trace other stolen pieces. Despite initial communication, Arthouse ceased responding, leaving the situation unresolved and prompting Wewe to seek further investigation into the matter.

== Politics ==
In 2009, Wewe was appointed commissioner of Tourism and Culture in Ondo State for a part of Olusegun Mimiko's administration. His appointment was terminated in 2015 when he defected from the Peoples Democratic Party to the opposition All Progressives Congress and was replaced by Femi Adekanmbi.

== Exhibitions ==
- "Footnotes". An exhibition of paintings and terracotta pieces exhibited at Nike Art Gallery in 2010.
- "Tola Wewe" by Bose Fagbemi. Held at the Galerie Duvivier, Paris, France in 2015.
- "Àpéwò: The Musical Linguistics of Tolá Wewe’s Painting". Held in Abuja in 2018.
- “Metamodern Vision: A Retrospective Exhibition of Tola Wewe’s Works". Held in Lagos in 2022.
- "Best of Ife" by Ayoola Mudasiru. Featuring Kunle Filani, Victor Ekpuk and other alumni of Ife Art School. Held in Lagos in 2023.
