= Okukenu =

Yoruba chief

Okukenu Sagbua (c. 1790–1862) was a Yoruba Egba chief. He was a founding member of the Ogboni of Egbaland, and also served as the first Alake of Egbaland.

== Life ==
Okùkẹ́nù was born sometime in the 1790s to Ọ̀ṣọ́ of Igbein in Egba Ake and Matiku, who was herself from Imo, a town that was also in Egba Ake. His mother was a daughter of Adesomi, who was one of the daughters of Lukoye. Lukoye was a son of Laarun, an Alake of the Egba who ruled in the 18th century. His mother was also related to Deliyi, an early figure in Abeokuta history, who was the Balogun of the town of Ijemo.

Upon the exodus of the Egba refugees to the comparative safety of Olumo Rock in Abeokuta in the aftermath of their homeland's destruction during the Yoruba Civil Wars, the traditional councils of chiefs - otherwise known as the Ogboni - that had formerly governed them were reconstituted. Okukenu was co-opted into the civil council during this exercise, and so his erstwhile title - Sagbua - was recognized as a civil one thereafter, even though it had originally been a military rank as an Eso Ikoyi title.

Following the death of the Egba paramount chief Shodeke in 1845, Okukenu and a brace of other powerful chiefs ruled Abeokuta jointly for a time. The rivalry that existed between them led to an anarchy that was only exacerbated by the slave trade, which was then at its peak.

After the death of the Losi of Ake (hitherto a favourite to succeed Shodeke), Okukenu was chosen and crowned on 8 August 1854. Before his crowning, he unsuccessfully attempted to retrieve the head of the murdered Alake, Okikilu, who was the last paramount chief of the Egba people before the migration to Abeokuta.

Following his coronation, he became the first Alake to rule in the fortified city of Abeokuta. As an ex-civil chief, he had the support of the civil chiefs during his reign, but was opposed by both the war chiefs and the trade chiefs, who had both profited from the state of anarchy. Okukenu managed to maintain order in his kingdom despite their efforts, though his authority wasn't great. He was supported in this by Bashorun Apati, a former rival, who held office during his reign as the prime minister of Egbaland.

Okukenu died on August 31, 1862. During the subsequent interregnum, Bashorun Shomoye, a cousin of his, administered the kingdom.

== Marriage and family ==
Okukenu had many wives and children. One of his wives, Efunwunmi, was originally a wife to another high chief - the Baase of Igbein - and had a son by him by the name of Arikuola. Upon seeing Efunwunmi, Okukenu decreed that she must be his wife, and forcefully took her as such. Okukenu and Efunwunmi's son, Gbadebo (who was born in June 1854), later went on to become Gbadebo I, the Alake of Egbaland.

== Descendants ==
Okukenu's great-grandson, Adedotun Aremu Gbadebo III, is the current Alake of Egbaland.
