= Gbadebo =

Gbadebo is a Yoruba name meaning "the one who brings the crown" or "born with a crown".

== Gbadebo as a first/given name ==
- Gbadebo Rhodes-Vivour

== Gbadebo as a last name ==
- Adebayo Gbadebo
- Adedotun Aremu Gbadebo III
- Samuel Adesina Gbadebo
