= Tolu Aliki =

- Born: Toluwalase Olamigoke Aliki; 7 February 1976 (age 50)
- Citizenship: Nigeria
- Education: Olabisi Onabanjo University Ago-Iwoye
- Occupations: Painter, Sculptor
- Known for: Figurative painting

Toluwalase Olamigoke Aliki (born 7 February 1976), known professionally as Tolu Aliki, is a Nigerian figurative painter and sculptor. He is mostly known for his thematic paintings that focus on family, nature, love, music and social interactions.

== Early life and education ==
Born in Ibadan, Oyo State, in 1976, Tolu Aliki spent much of his childhood in his home state, Ondo State, where he developed an early love for art and visual narrative. He later graduated in Mass Communication from Olabisi Onabanjo University, Ogun State, in 2006. His training in Mass Communication did not stop him from pursuing his artistic interests in drawing and painting.

== Work ==
Aliki integrates human figures with Nigerian landscapes, emphasizing harmony between human presence and the surrounding natural elements. His self-thought approach stylized human figures and compositions capture social interactions and personal emotions.

== Exhibitions ==
Aliki has been featured in group exhibitions in Nigeria, Ethiopia and United States, including “Art in the Bank, Sterling One Private Banking Art Gallery”, Lagos; “Art for Peace, Ufuk Dialogue Foundation (UDF) and OYASAF”, United Nations Headquarters, New York, USA, and a group of exhibition of painting and sculptures, which held at Alexis Gallery, Lagos. Some of the titles of his featured paintings that are exhibited are "The Rebirth," "Shades of Love," "Intimate Moments, " "Presence," "The Good Life," and "Colours of Passion."
