= Omo-Oba Adenrele Ademola =

Nigerian princess and nurse

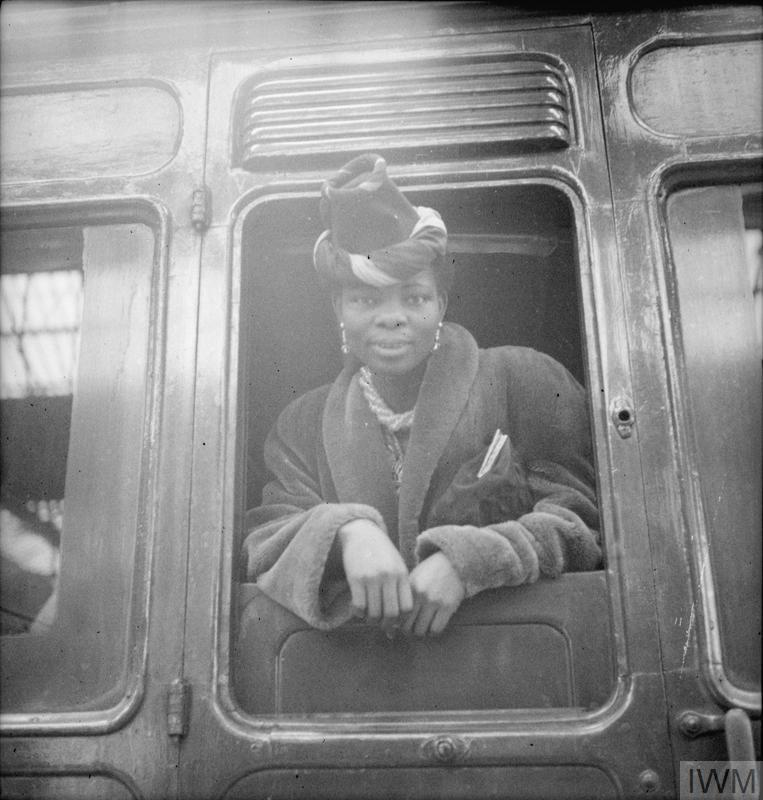
- Omo-Oba Adenrele Ademola returning home from London
- Born: 12 January 1916
- Occupation: Nurse
- Father: The Alake of Egbaland, Oba Ladapo Ademola II
- Relatives: Adetokunbo Ademola

Princess Adenrele Ademola or Omo-Oba Adenrele Ademola (born 1916) was a Nigerian princess and nurse. She trained as a nurse in London in the 1930s, and remained working there through World War II. She was the subject of a film, Nurse Ademola, made by the Colonial Film Unit and now considered lost.

== Life ==
Omo-Oba Adenrele Ademola was born in Nigeria on 2 January 1916. She was the daughter of Ladapo Ademola, the Alake of Abeokuta. She arrived in Britain on 29 June 1935, and initially stayed at the West African Students’ Union's hostel in Camden Town. In 1937 she attended royal appointments in Britain with her father and brother, Adetokunbo Ademola. She attended a school in Somerset for two years, and by January 1938 had started training as a nurse at Guy's Hospital. In 1941 she had become a registered nurse at Guy's. She later also gained Central Midwives Board qualifications, and worked at Queen Charlotte’s Maternity Hospital and New End Hospital.

Ademola's patients apparently called her "fairy" as a term of endearment. "Everyone was very kind to me", she told journalists at the time.

A photograph of Ademola appeared in a 1942 pamphlet about the BBC's international activity. George Pearson's film about her, Nurse Ademola is now lost. Made in 1943 or 1944–5, it was a 16mm silent newsreel film in a series for the Colonial Film Unit called The British Empire at War. The film was screened across West Africa, and said to have inspired many African viewers for the imperial war effort.

In 1948 she was travelling with the businessman Adeola Odutola. Little is known about her activity after the 1940s, with the last record of her being in 1949, when she was working as a nurse in South Kensington.
