= Egba Gbagura =

Ẹ̀gbá Gbágùrá
- Traditional state
- Location in Nigeria
- Coordinates: 7°9′39″N 3°20′54″E
- Country: Nigeria
- State: Ogun State

Egba Gbagura is one of the five sections of Egbaland, the others being Ake, Oke-Ona, the Owu and Ibara (historically, Ibara is part of Yewa (Egbado), not Egba, although it is located in the present day Abeokuta geographically). It is a traditional state which joins with its bordering sections to form something of a high kingship.

The Agura of Gbagura is the traditional ruler of this subsection of the Egba, and under his jurisdiction are the rulers of the 72 townships that each bear the title Baale. Though the Agura is technically in equal power to the Alake, ever since the colonial era the Alake has been considered to be the supreme leader of all of Egbaland, not just the Ake section.

== History ==
The Egba people's original homeland in the Egba forest was established by Yoruba migrants from elsewhere. According to The History of the Yorubas by Samuel Johnson, Eso Ikoyi chiefs in the retinue of the first Alake of the Egbas joined him in founding a new community - the confederacy of towns that became known as Orile Egba - in the forest after they left the nascent Oyo empire in around the 13th century AD. Orile Egba continued to exist until its destruction during the Yoruba civil war of the 19th century.

The Egba people originally lived in the Oyo Empire until an Egba, Lisabi, organized a revolt against the Alaafin of the Oyo Empire. Lisabi is therefore considered the father of the Egba people.

Abeokuta was founded as a replacement for Orile Egba in around 1830 by the Egbas after the collapse of the Oyo empire during the civil war. The city was founded because of its strong defensive physical position by refugees trying to protect themselves against slave raiders from Dahomey, who were trying to benefit from the war. The Gbagura people were specifically lead to Abeokuta by Balogun Ojo of Gbagura.

The Egba Gbagura, along with the other 4 groups who founded Abeokuta, avoided crowning kings until 1870. This was when the Gbagura appointed Jamolu as the first Agura of Gbagura. The Gbagura section of Nigeria originally included 144 townships scattered all over Yorubaland stretching all the way to modern day Ibadan. 72 of these towns rebelled against the allegiance of the Agura and later joined the Oke-Ona section of Egba. Towns under the jurisdiction of the Gbagura include Iddo, Ilugun, Ilawo, and others. Each township brings a chief which serves alongside the Agura and the rest of the kings of Egbaland, and in the Ogboni of Egbaland, the supreme legislative council of chiefs. The township of Iddo is the only township that can produce an Agura.

The history of all the Egba also include many wars fought with neighboring people and kingdoms. In 1832, Abeokuta was involved in war with the people of Ijebu Remo, and in 1834 with the Ibadan people. Sporadic fighting continued with the people of Ota (1842), Ado (1844), Ibarapa (1849), Dahomey (1851), Ijebu-Ere (1851), Ijaye (1860–1862) and the Makun War of 1862–1864. The Dahomeans were long time enemies of the Egba and Dahomey attempted to conquer Egbaland up to 4 times but they were unsuccessful. The Egba success is attributed to the legendary Olumo rock, which towers Abeokuta. In fact, the name Abẹokuta literally means "under the rock," abẹ meaning under and okuta meaning rock or stone. It is said the Egba hid under the rock and use it as an advantage point when fighting. On 18 January 1893, a treaty was signed with the governor and commander-in-chief of the British Lagos Colony for the purpose of trade; the British recognized Egbaland as an independent state. In 1898, the Egba United Government was formed.

In 1904, an agreement was made where the British assumed jurisdiction in certain legal cases, and in the same year, the Alake Gbadebo paid a state visit to England. Over the following years, the British steadily assumed more responsibility for administration while continuing to formally recognize the Egba state. In 1914, the kingdom was incorporated into the newly amalgamated British Colony and Protectorate of Nigeria.

== Rulers ==
Rulers of the Egba Gbagura in Abeokuta, who took the title "Agura" in 1870

There are 2 ruling houses in Gbagura, Ajiboso and Egiri. The Agura answers only to the Alake of Egbaland and is third in power behind the Ake and Oke-Ona Egba.

Start	End	Ruler
1870	1877	Oba Jamolu (Egiri ruling house)
1879	1897	Oba Ijaade (Egiri ruling house)
1897	1910	Oba Olubunmi (Ajiboso ruling house)
1910	1915	Oba Abolade (Egiri ruling house)
1915	1936	Oba Adeosun I (Egiri ruling house)
1936	1960	Oba Sobekun I (Ajiboso ruling house)
1961	1978	Oba Rauf Adeosun II (Egiri ruling house)
1980	12 Jul 2018	Oba Halidu Laloko Sobekun II (Ajiboso ruling house)
12 May 2019		Oba Saburee Babajide Isola Bakre Jamolu II (Egiri ruling house)

== Notable members of the Egba Gbagura community ==
- Chief MKO Abiola, successful Nigerian businessman and undeclared winner of the June 1993 Nigerian Presidential election
- Madam Efunroye Tinubu, powerful female aristocrat in pre-colonial Nigeria
- Alhaji Sarafa Tunji Ishola, Nigerian politician
