= Johfrim Art and Design Studio =

Arts and culture gallery

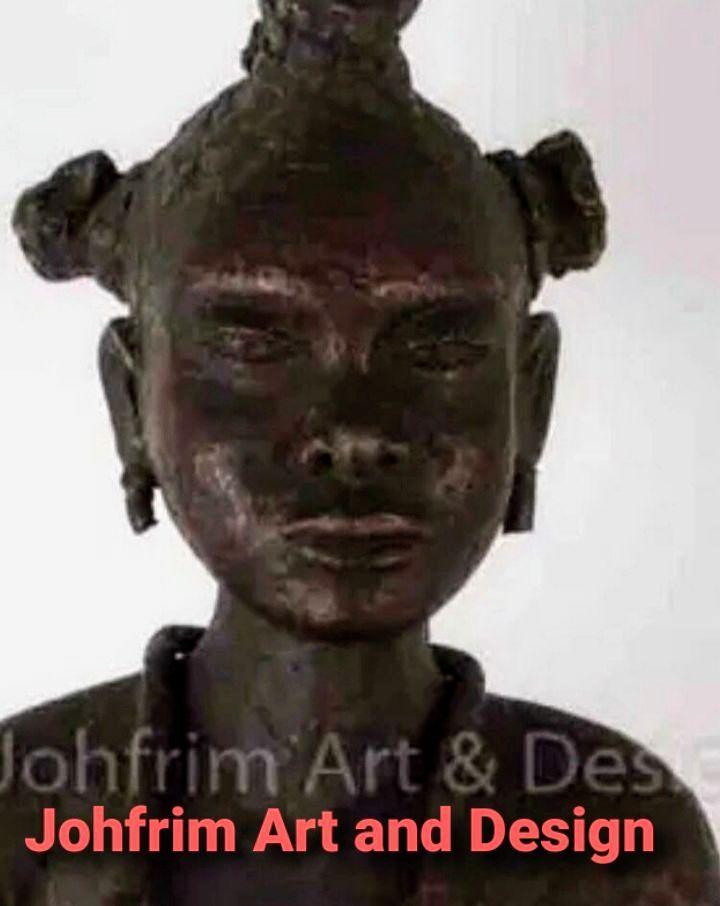
- Abbreviation: JAND
- Formation: 2013; 13 years ago
- Type: Private Art Gallery
- Purpose: Art and Culture Promotion
- Location: Lagos Nigeria, Glasgow Scotland.
- Region served: Nigeria; United Kingdom
- Founder: Josephine Oboh Macleod

Johfrim Art and Design Studio is a contemporary African art gallery in Nigeria and Scotland. The gallery hosts 6,000 diverse artworks from African artists such as Nike Davies-Okundaye, and it holds the third-largest art collection in Nigeria.

== Gallery History ==
Johfrim began as a private art collection in 2013 and was formed by Chief Josephine Oboh Macleod, the first black female in Scotland to possess contemporary African art and a cultural center.

Johfrim is home to several African and foreign artworks, and the gallery houses Nigeria's third largest African art collection, with 6,000 artworks excluding sculptures, paintings, and other media. It is located behind Oyasaf and Nike Art Gallery, which each include 7,000 and 8,000 artworks. Johfrim arranges cross-cultural events and represents the work of about 50 artists, including Lamidi Olonade Fakeye, from Africa. Johfrim is a charity affiliated with the JOM.

== Notable works ==
- African Queen, the painting was sold by Nelson Mandela Foundation
- The Maiden, sculpture displayed by Nike Art Gallery
