= Eso Ikoyi =

Aristrocratic attribute in Yoruba culture

Eso Ikoyi (also appearing as Esho Ikoyi) is an aristocratic attribute amongst the Yoruba people which denotes an eminent warrior. It has been used as everything from a chieftaincy title to a part of praise poetry.

== History ==
The Eso of Ikoyi were a class of military aristocrats that were just a rank below the Oyo Mesi (or council of State) of Old Oyo, a Yoruba empire that flourished in the medieval and early modern periods.

They were originally a professional group of cavalry officers who became the elite corps of the Oyo army. They evolved within a number of prominent families in Ikoyi, in the metropolitan province of Oyo in the 17th and 18th centuries, manifesting and sustaining high standards of bravery and proficiency, with their own culture and code of honour handed down from father to son.

With the collapse of the empire at the beginning of the 19th century, and the shift of the capital southwards into the forest zone, cavalry ceased to be the elite of Oyo's army, and the Eso of Ikoyi were dispersed to learn new arts of war. Among generations of descendants, young men in several locations often called Ikoyi aspired to live up to the reputation of the Eso. By the second half of the 19th century, Eso had become a title of honour that was conferred on individual younger warriors for outstanding achievement in battle, reminiscent of the bravery and code of honour of the classical Eso of Ikoyi.

== Notable bearers ==
- Okukenu, Sagbua I of Egbaland. Although Sagbua was originally an Eso title, its first Egba bearer, Okukenu, was admitted to the civil division of the Ogboni of Egbaland while holding it. Due to this, it remains a civil title to this day in that kingdom. Okukenu later relinquished it in order to become the first Alake of Egbaland.
- Lasilo, Osiele I of Osiele. A contemporary of Okukenu's and a fellow holder of an originally Eso chieftaincy, Lasilo was admitted to the military division of the Egba Ogboni while holding the title of Osiele. He thus became the first Egba chief to rule over the Osiele military outpost that eventually became a suburb of Abeokuta. Like Sagbua, Osiele continues to be used as a title of honour in the Egba chieftaincy hierarchy to this day.
- Kayode Eso, a member of the Odumirin/Arobiomo chieftaincy family of Ilesha. Mr. Eso's grandfather, Ifaturoti, was a holder of the Eso chieftaincy title. As a result, the Eso family's praise poetry describes their history: Eso Ikoyi, Eso Aduroja, Apara Ogun bi eni pa'le. When translated to English, this becomes "Eso of Ikoyi, the one who waits to fight, who finishes off the war with the care of one rubbing paint on a paved wall".

== See also ==
- Emi Omo Eso
- Nigerian Chieftaincy
