= Emi Omo Eso =

Moral code of the Eso Ikoyi

Emi Omo Eso is the name ascribed to the moral code of the Eso Ikoyi warrior caste of the Yorubas of West Africa. Its literal translation is I, the child of an Eso.

== History ==
Following the establishment of the cavalry division of the imperial army of Old Oyo in about the 17th century, the dynasties of Eso chieftains that developed out of it in the metropolitan town of Ikoyi became famous over time for a manner of conduct that came to be synonymous with the noble titleholders themselves.

Eventually coming to describe the proper behaviour of both the Esos and their numerous lineal heirs, the code was encapsulated in a series of proverbs that were passed down through the generations of the Eso families, proverbs which served by way of tradition as mnemonic devices.

== Proverbs ==
The proverbs that make up the body of the Emi Omo Eso philosophical credo include the following:

Ohun meji l'o ye Eso
Eso ja O le ogun
Eso ja O ku si ogun.

One of two things befits an Eso: The Eso must fight and conquer or the Eso must fight and perish.

Eso ki igba Ofa lehin
Afi bi o ba gbogbe niwaju gangan.

An Eso must never be shot in the back, his wounds must always be right in front.

Alakoro ki isa ogun.

One that wears a coronet must never flee in battle.

== Affirmation ==
Emi Omo Eso also affected the succeeding generations of Eso heirs. Following the disbanding of the cavalry itself in the 19th century, the children and grandchildren of its former members began to use its name as an affirmation in a manner similar to the usage of the Latin dictum infra dignitatem. Seeing as how a classical Eso was both traditionally obligated and widely considered to be noble in both word and deed, stating that you were a descendant of such a personage was seen within this culture as a means of subconsciously causing yourself to live up to his legacy. The phrase therefore could variously symbolize your contempt for anything mean or low, or your scorn for difficulty, danger or - potentially - death itself. By stating that you were a child of an Eso, you were effectively declaring that you knew no fear, or that a particular thing was beneath your dignity.

== See also ==
- Bushido - A similar concept from Japan
- Chivalry - A similar concept from Europe
