= Samuel Adesina Gbadebo =

Alake of Abeokuta

Samuel Adesina Gbadebo, otherwise known as Gbadebo II, was a Nigerian traditional monarch who held the title of Alake of Egbaland. Prior to becoming Alake, Gbadebo organized agricultural shows in the Western region of Nigeria.

== Life ==
Gbadebo was born in September 1908 to the royal family of Oba Gbadebo I and Esther Omolara. He graduated from Abeokuta Grammar School. He began his professional career within the Egba Native Authority, where he had the opportunity to work with Alake Ladapo Ademola, who took interest in his career. Thereafter, he joined the staff of the Nigerian Railway Corporation as a clerk, he worked for the railways thereafter in both the Eastern and Western regions. In 1936, he returned to Abeokuta, engaged with the Egba Native Authority, he took classes in forestry at Ibadan and later became head of forestry for the Egba Native Authority. Between 1954 and 1955, he was in training at the British Forestry Commission. When he returned to Nigeria, he worked for the Western region in promoting agricultural shows.

In 1963, he was appointed Alake of Egbaland. In his new role, he established an advisory committee consisting of the four areas of Abeokuta: Ake, Gbagura, Oke-Ona and Owu. The committee's decisions were forwarded to the district council for guidance on Abeokuta matters. Gbadebo also instigated a unifying committee to manage the affairs of the Abeokuta Urban District Council and Abeokuta Divisional Council. He sided with Akintola's NNA alliance during the Western region political crisis between 1964 and 1966 and sought to use his patronage to support Egbaland.

He died in 1971 and was succeeded by Oba Lipede. He is an uncle of Oba Gbadebo III.
