= F. A. S. Ogunmuyiwa =

Nigerian judicial official and sports administrator (died circa 1975)

- Born: Francis Albert Shodolamu Ogunmuyiwa
- Died: circa 1975
- Citizenship: Nigerian
- Occupations: Lawyer, educationist, judicial official, sports administrator
- Known for: Serving in the government that inherited power upon Independence in 1960
- Spouse: Emmanuella Agboola Ogunmuyiwa (née Adeyinka)

Francis Albert Shodolamu Ogunmuyiwa (died circa 1975) was a Nigerian judicial official and sports administrator. A man of public affairs, he served in the colonial and First Republic governments of his country.

== Life ==
A Yoruba Catholic, Ogunmuyiwa hailed from the Egba community of Ilawo. His patron saint was St. Francis of Assisi.

After qualifying as a lawyer, he entered the civil service. By 1961, Ogunmuyiwa was a grade-one magistrate in Lagos, and was promoted to a chief magistrate of that city shortly thereafter. He was serving in this capacity when he issued a judgement against a corrupt police officer in 1963.

Ogunmuyiwa served as an acting director of the Nigerian Law School during its infancy, when it was based at a temporary campus at Igbosere in the Lagos Island district.

In addition to serving in the judiciary, he was also concurrently involved in the sporting sector. From 1961 until 1962, he served as the second indigenous chairperson of the Nigerian Football Association. His national service also included membership of the committee, headed by Sir Mobolaji Bank Anthony, that oversaw the construction and management of the national stadium in Surulere.

He retired from the civil service in 1965.

Outside of government, he continued to serve as a notable lawyer. Important cases that he was involved in during this period include The Minister of Lagos Affairs, Mines, and Power and another vs. Akin-Olugbade and others, Olugbade and others vs. Onigbongbo community and others, and Mumuni and others vs. The State.

He died in or around 1975.

== Personal life ==
Ogunmuyiwa was married to Emmanuella Agboola Ogunmuyiwa (née Adeyinka), a member of the Ogunmuyiwa Ologbonwon and Edun families of Egbaland. She was an educationist, women's leader, socialite and papal honouree.

The Ogunmuyiwas had three surviving biological children and one foster child together. Mr. Ogunmuyiwa also had four biological children with other women.
