= Oladejo Okediji =

Nigerian Yoruba writer (1929–2019)

Oladejo Okediji (born 1929 in Oyo, died March 17, 2019; Yoruba: Ọládẹ̀jọ Òkèdìjí) was a Nigerian writer, novelist, and playwright. He authored several works in the Yoruba language and pioneered crime fiction genre in Yoruba literature with his 1969 novel Àjà Ló L'ẹrù.

== Personal life and career ==
Okediji had his primary education at went to Methodist School, Apaara, and St Andrew's Primary School from 1935 and 1943. He then had a stint as a teacher at St Andrew's before entering Wesley College, Ibadan where be had his secondary education from 1945 to 1948.

In 1954, Nigeria's Western Regional Literature Committee advertised for entries into a creative writing programme in Yoruba. Okediji entered for the competition with what would become his first published work, Àjà Ló L'ẹrù. This call was what spurred Okediji to write in Yoruba language. He had actually drafted his manuscript in English language: "The Big Buffoon", later translated as Àgbàlagbà Akàn.

Influenced by the works of Agatha Christie and Conan Doyle, Okediji pioneered the detective fiction writing in Yoruba language, creating the detective character, Lápàdé, in his first two novels, Àjà Ló L'ẹrù (1969) and Àgbàlagbà Akàn (1971). After the duology, Okediji was encouraged by Ola Rotimi to also try writing plays in Yoruba language. it was as a result of that nudge that he published of Rẹrẹ Run, which has been translated in French as Catastrophe au rendezvous. After some three decades, published Ká rìn ká pọ̀ (2007) as a sequel to his Lápàdé crime thriller series extending it to a trilogy.

Almost all of Okediji's works have been prescribed as school texts in Nigeria for WASSCE and in Nigerian universities, and his novels have been serialized in newspapers and on the radio. His plays have also been staged and adapted into movies by various film directors and cinematographers.

From 1958 to 1961, Okediji ventured into politics, and served as a counselor in Oyo. He is the father of Nigerian painter and art historian Moyo Okediji.

== Death ==
Oladejo Okediji died in March 2019, and was buried in Apaara, Oyo, his hometown, on 19 April 2019.

== Anthology ==
Àjà Ló L'ẹrù (1969)

Àgbàlagbà Akàn (1971)

Ọ̀gá ni Bùkọ́lá (1972)

Rẹrẹ Run (1973)

Owó Ẹ̀jẹ̀ (1976)

Ìmúra Ìdánwó Yorùbá (1978)

Atótó Arére (1981)

Ṣàǹgó (1987)

Ọ̀pá Àgbélékà (1989)

Bínú Ti Rí (1989)

Ìròyìn Ayọ̀

Aájò Ajé (1997)

Running After Riches (English translation of Aájò Ajé, trans. by Okediji and Karin Barber, 1999)

Ká rìn ká pọ̀ (2007)

Àárò Ọlọ́mọge (2014)

Ohùn Ẹnu Àgbà - a collection of poems (2018)

== Relevant scholarly literature ==
Adeyemi, Lere. "Proverbs and Anti-proverbs in Ọladẹjọ Okediji’s Rérẹ́ Rún: A Marxist Perspectives.” Paremia, vol. 21, 2012, pp. 207-218. Open access
