= Olatunji Yemisi =

Nigerian squash player

Personal information
- Full name: Olatunji Yemisi Olufunmilayo
- Born: 14 February 1994 (age 32) Igbara-Odo, Ekiti State
- Height: 5.7 ft (174 cm)
- Weight: 64 kg (141 lb)

Sport
- Country: Nigeria
- Handedness: Right-handed
- Turned pro: 2014
- Retired: 2023
- Racquet used: Harrow
- Highest ranking: 104
Medal record
Women'sSquash
Representing Nigeria
National Sport Festival "EDO 2020"
| Gold medal – first place | 2021 Edo | Singles |
| Gold medal – first place | 2018 Abuja | Singles |
Safeguard Zimbabwe Squash International Open
| Gold medal – first place | 2018 Zimbabwe | Singles |
| Gold medal – first place | 2017 Zimbabwe | Singles |
President Obasanjo Squash Open
| Gold medal – first place | 2014 Abeokuta | Singles |
| Gold medal – first place | 2013 Abeokuta | Singles |

Olatunji Yemisi (born 14 February 1994) is a Nigerian former professional squash player from Ekiti State, Nigeria. She turned professional in 2014 and went on to dominate the squash scene in Nigeria and the West Africa region for over a decade. Yemisi achieved the highest ranking of any female player in Nigerian squash history, reaching a career-high of 104 in the Professional Squash Association World Rankings. She is currently a professional squash coach.

She is also instrumental in the Sqaush Development of her sister Olatunji Busayo who is also a PSA Pro Player.

== Early squash career ==
Olatunji Yemisi commenced her squash career in 2004 at the age of 10 in Akure, Ondo State, Nigeria. During her early years, she was coached by Coach Ojo and Coach Sadiat Akande.

Yemisi achieved her first major success in 2008, winning a bronze medal at the Fembass Squash Tournament in the Under-19 category, four years after taking up the sport. Her dominance in the junior category led to her promotion to the senior category in 2011, following a three-year streak of winning numerous medals.

== Professional squash career ==
Yemisi received her promotion to the senior category in 2011 at the age of 17, quickly establishing herself as a formidable opponent to senior players. Her breakthrough came in 2012, when she secured her first senior medals: a bronze medal in the Singles Category and a gold medal in the Teams Category at the National Sports Festival in Lagos.

Yemisi's dominance in Nigerian squash continued unabated, as she won back-to-back national tournaments in 2012 and 2013. This success paved the way for her transition to professional squash, and she became a Professional Squash Association (PSA) player in 2014.

For over a decade, Yemisi dominated Nigerian squash, solidifying her position as the most successful squash player in Nigeria's History.

== Titles ==
Yemisi has competed in numerous high-profile tournaments, achieving victory in several of them. Notable examples include the OTrafford PSA National Closed Satellite Squash Tournament, Lagos International Squash Classic, Wisers PSA Open, Calgary Professional Squash Association, Professional Squash Players Association of Nigeria (PSPAN) National Open Tournament, Chamberlain Squash Open Safeguard Zimbabwe International Open.

== Squash advocacy ==
Yemisi has constantly advocated for the advancement of squash in Nigeria and West Africa, recognized for her strategic insights and recommendations that drive growth and improvement in the sport. With a deep understanding of the region's squash landscape, she has consistently suggested initiatives that will enhance infrastructure, accessibility, and competitiveness, contributing significantly to the sport's development and progress.
