= Oyasaf =

Art Foundation

OYASAF
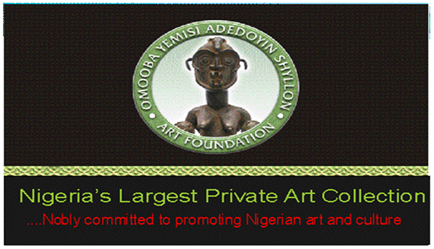
- Formation: 2007
- Founder: Yemisi Adedoyin Shyllon
- Type: NGO
- Purpose: Art & Culture Promotion
- Headquarters: Lagos, Nigeria
- Website: www.oyasaf.com

Oyasaf is an art foundation that holds a large private art collection in Nigeria.

== History ==
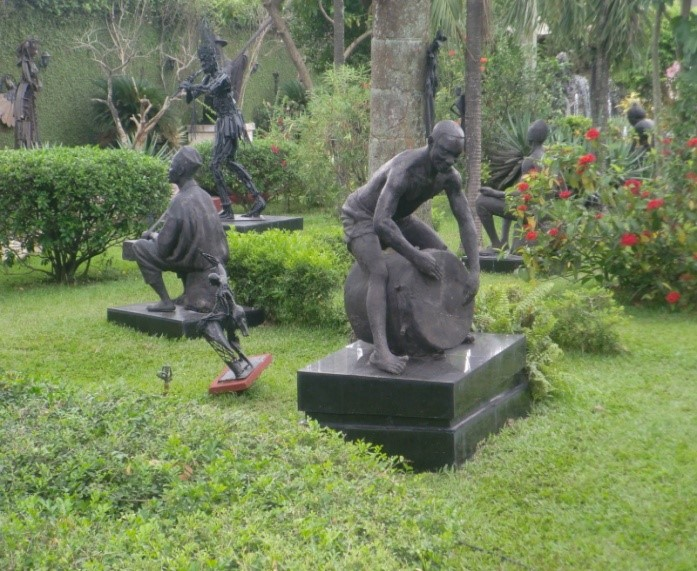
OYASAF Garden.

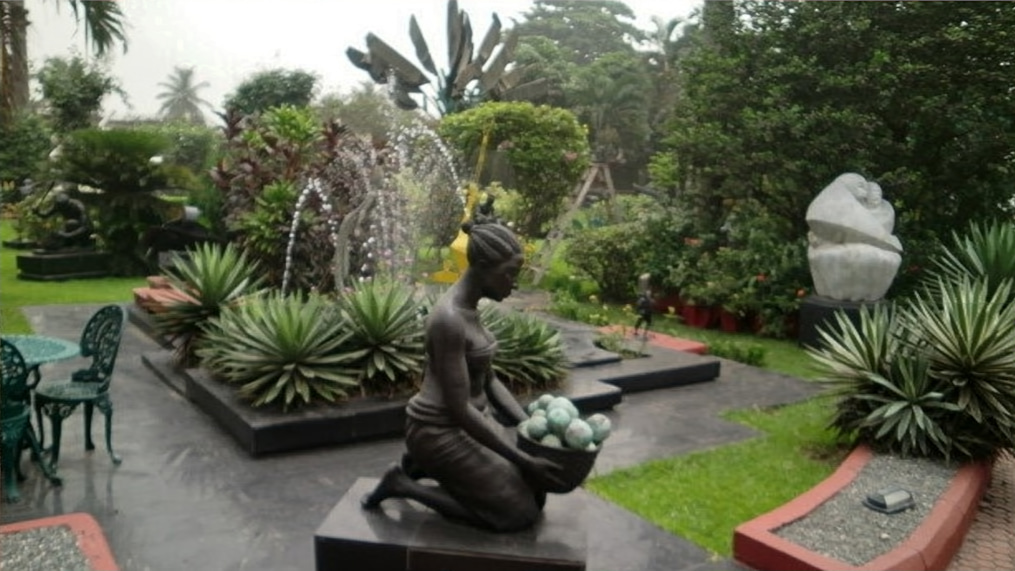
OYASAF Garden.

The foundation was created by Omoba Yemisi Adedoyin Shyllon in 2007.

In March 2020, the Yemisi Shyllon Museum of Art is due to open, a contemporary art museum financed by Oyasaf. The 1,200-foot-square new museum, designed by the architect Jesse Castellote, will be owned and managed by the Pan-Atlantic University. The museum is Nigeria's first privately-funded university museum.

== Collection ==
Oyasaf houses over 7,000 artworks, including sculptures, paintings and other media, as well as over 55,000 photographic shots of Nigeria's cultural festivals.

== Fellowship program ==
The foundation regularly sponsors foreign and Nigerian scholars, curators, artists and art historians to interact with and utilize its art collection for their studies and researches, collaborate with Nigeria’s artists, curators, museums, galleries, other collectors and Nigerian art institutions, for promoting Nigerian art and culture to the world.

It sponsored seventeen fellows from the USA, Kenya, South Africa, Ghana, Germany, Switzerland and Austria. Some of the previous beneficiaries of the Oyasaf fellowship program are from the following institutions: University of Chicago (USA), University of Wisconsin (USA), Stanford University (USA), University of Vienna (Austria), Rhodes University (South Africa), Ziko Museum (South Africa), Columbia University (USA). Most of the foundation's sponsored students are not Nigerian.

== Other activities ==
Oyasaf has organized art workshops and collaborations with tertiary institutions and other foundations including the University of Lagos, the University of Port Harcourt and the Ufuk Dialogue Foundation of Turkey. In April 2017, after a 3-day workshop, the Oyasaf established Beyond Borders Artists Association of Nigeria (BBAAN), which organizes art exhibitions in nigeria's prisons.

Oyasaf lends its art to local and international museums (e.g. New York Museum of African Art, 2010-2013).

Oyasaf donated life-size sculptural monuments to public places and institutions in Nigeria, including the eighteen life-size sculptures at the Freedom Park in Lagos and monuments to the University of Lagos and the University of Ibadan.

Oyasaf launched an online journal, TOJA (The Oyasaf Journal of Art), which is published under the Yemisi Shyllon Professorial Chair of the University of Port Harcourt.
