= Yemisi Shyllon Museum of Art =

Art museum in Lekki, Nigeria

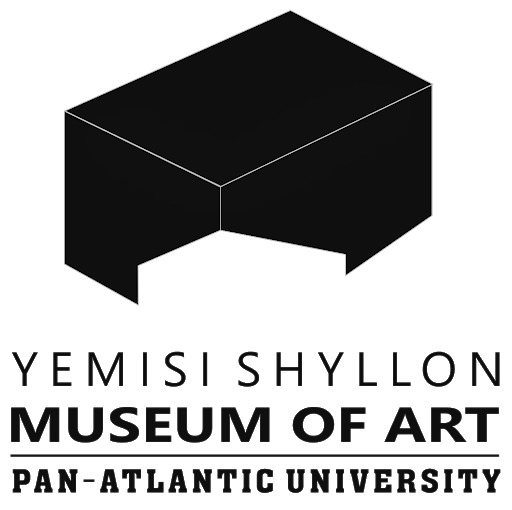

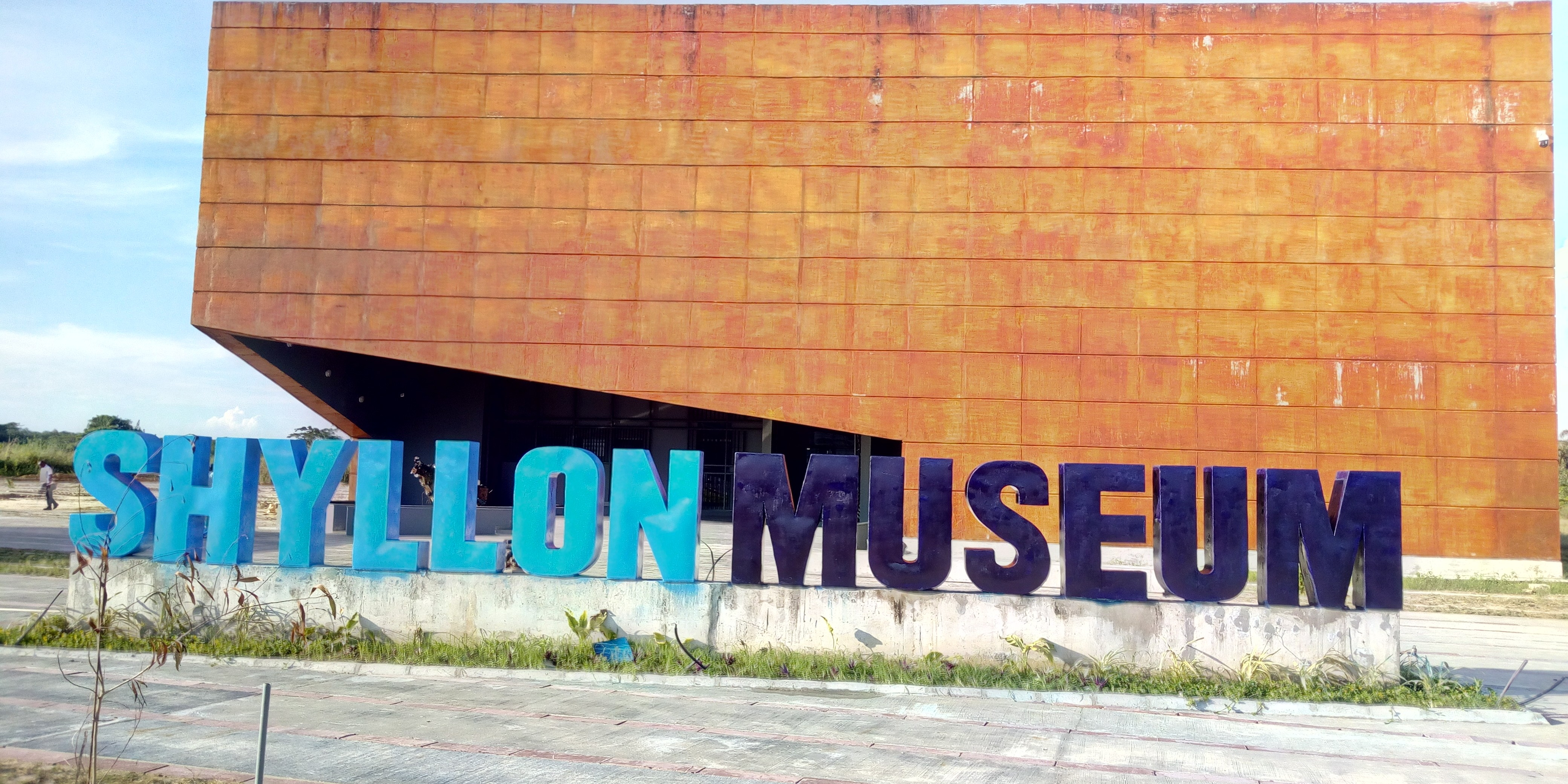
- Established: October 18, 2019; 7 years ago
- Location: Lekki, Nigeria
- Coordinates: 6.488203°N 3.854956°E
- Type: Art museum
- Website: museum.pau.edu.ng

The Yemisi Shyllon Museum of Art is a privately-owned museum located on the main campus of the Pan-Atlantic University in Lagos State, Nigeria.

== History ==
The idea of creating a museum at the university had been in the works for quite some time. In April 2011, the university took a step towards this by launching the Virtual Museum of Modern and Contemporary Nigerian Art on its website. As time went on, the university received proposals from various Nigerian collectors who expressed interest in helping to set up an art museum at PAU. Although none of these proposals materialized, the university included plans for a future museum in its initial Masterplan to develop its main campus in Ibeju Lekki.

In 2012, following an initial brief developed by the university and the design consultants, some preliminary drawings for the museum were produced. Then, in September 2014, Prince Yemisi Shyllon, an art collector, presented a proposal to the university, offering works from his collection to be housed in the university museum. The university accepted his proposal, and in June 2015, both parties signed a formal agreement, establishing the Yemisi Shyllon Museum of Art. The agreement entailed Prince Shyllon donating 1,000 artworks from his collection to the future museum. Additionally, he pledged to provide financial support for the construction and long-term sustainability of the museum through regular payments.

In mid-2015, the university appointed Redgrey Associates, a Lagos-based firm, as consultants for the project. The definition and design of the museum then began to take shape. By December 2018, Jess Castellote, who had previously collaborated on the building's design, was appointed as the museum's first Director. Construction of the museum building was completed in June 2019, and it officially opened to the public in October of the same year.

== Collections ==
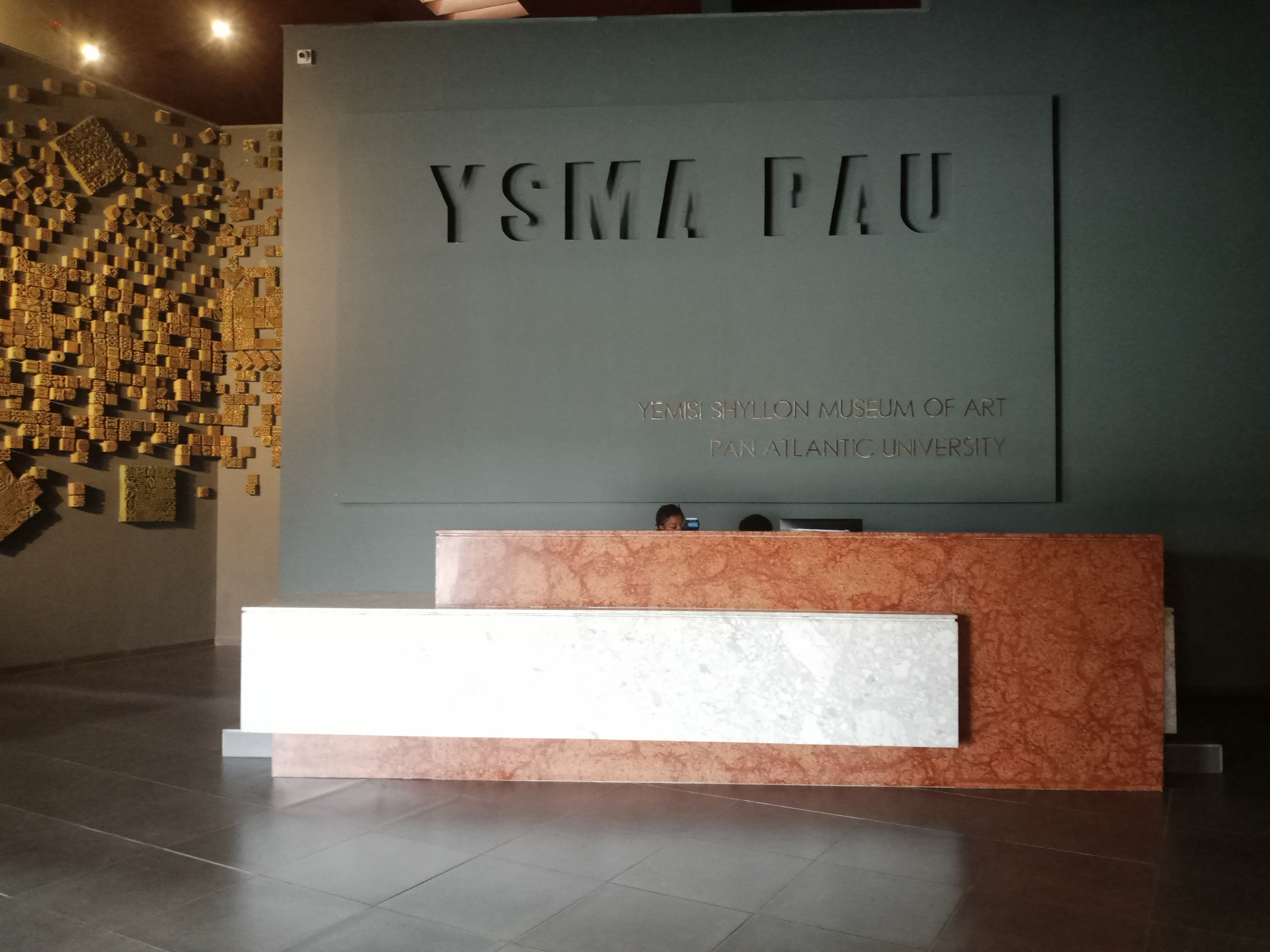
Museum interior

The museum contains works of art from different West African artists such as El Anatsui, Uche Okeke and Bruce Onobrakpeya. The museum contains a collection of historical sculptures. The museum contains artwork dating from the pre-colonial period to the present. The museum contains Nok terracotta found in Igbo-Ukwu and North Central Nigeria, plus exhibits on Ife art and Benin art. The museum contains traditional African wooden sculptures by Yoruba artist Lamidi Olonade Fakeye. In addition, the museum contains artworks by artists Ben Enwonwu, Peju Alatise, Victor Ehikhamenor, Akinola Lasekan and Aina Onabolu. The museum contains a bronze sculpture of an Ife head. The museum contains photographs of different cultural festivals in Nigeria, most of these photographs were produced by Ariyo Oguntimehin. In addition, the museum has sculptures by Isiaka Osunde, Oladapo Afolayan, Adeola Balogun and Okpu Eze. The museum also has a collection of wood carvings. The museum contains a collection of Afikpo masks, which are traditional masks made of wood used by the Afikpo people, an ethnic group of Ebonyi State.

The museum contains a section dedicated to members of the Oshogbo School of Art, featuring works by Muraina Oyelami, Susanne Wenger, Rufus Ogundele, and Nike Davies-Okundaye. The museum also contains Ifa Divination Trays. The museum has among its collections treasures dating from the 16th century from the kingdom of Benin, and a royal figurine dating from the 14th century belonging to the kingdom of Ife.

== Exhibitions ==
In 2019, the museum launched an exhibition curated by Iheanyi Onwuegbuchi titled "Mirroring Man" which was an exhibition on Nigerian art, society, and politics. The second exhibit curated by Ihaenyi Onwuegbuchi in 2020 "Making Matter", was an exhibition on materiality and technology.

In August 2021, the museum presented an exhibition called "The Invincible Hands", curated by Fisayo Bakare, celebrating the artistic contributions of Nigerian women artists.

In November 2022, Fisayo Bakare curated another "Water Under the Bridge", a display that explored the themes of migration and memory, inviting visitors to reflect on the journeys of migrants.
