= Moyo Okediji =

Yoruba historian

- Born: Moyosore Okediji; 1956 (age 69–70); Lagos
- Education: Obafemi Awolowo University; University of Benin; University of Wisconsin
- Known for: Painting; Mixed media
- Movement: African art
- Website: https://www.moyookediji.com

Moyo Okediji is an art historian, painter and artist whose works contains a number of icons and signifiers of the deep aspects of Yoruba culture. He was part of Ona, an art movement at Obafemi Awolowo University.

== Early life and education ==
Okediji was born in Lagos in 1956; his family hails from Oyo town, in Oyo state. His father, Oladejo Okediji, moved to Ile-Ife when Okediji was young and he spent most of his adolescent years in the ancient town. In 1977, he completed a degree in painting at the University of Ife, thereafter, he worked as a graduate assistant in the Faculty of Arts at the university. Okediji later earned a master's degree at University of Benin and returned to the University of Ife as a lecturer. While in Benin, he was influenced by the techniques of Guyanese painter Doris Rodgers who included decorative elements of African origin in her works.

== Work ==
In the late 1980s and early 1990s, Okediji, along with Kunle Filani and others were part of the art movement called Ona, the movement sought to reference Yoruba adages, proverbs, and visual concepts in their art works adjusted to modern Nigerian realities of the twentieth century. During the period, he also edited a short-lived magazine called Kurio Africana. The group held their first exhibition in March 1989 at the University of Ibadan.

Okedeji went on to obtain a PhD at the University of Wisconsin in 1995. He was the Curator of African and Oceanic Arts at the Denver Art Museum from 2003 to 2008. He is currently an academic staff of the University of Texas, Austin.

== Books ==
- Okediji, Moyo, 2011, Western Frontiers of African Art. Rochester, NY: University of Rochester

Press.ISBN 9781580463706.

- Okediji, Moyo. 2003. The Shattered Gourd: Yoruba Forms in 20th Century American Art.

Seattle: University of Washington Press. ISBN 0295981504.

- Okediji, Moyo. 2002. African Renaissance: Old Forms, New Images in Yoruba Art. Boulder:

University Press of Colorado. ISBN 0870816810.
