= Lamidi Olonade Fakeye =

Nigerian sculptor

- Born: 1925
- Died: December 25, 2009
- Known for: Sculpture

Lamidi Olonade Fakeye (1925 – December 25, 2009) was a fifth generation Nigerian sculptor and academic. He was from the Inurin compound of the Isedo Quaters in Ila-Orangun. Professor Lamidi contributed immensely to the growth of sculpture in the whole of the country and even beyond.

== Background ==
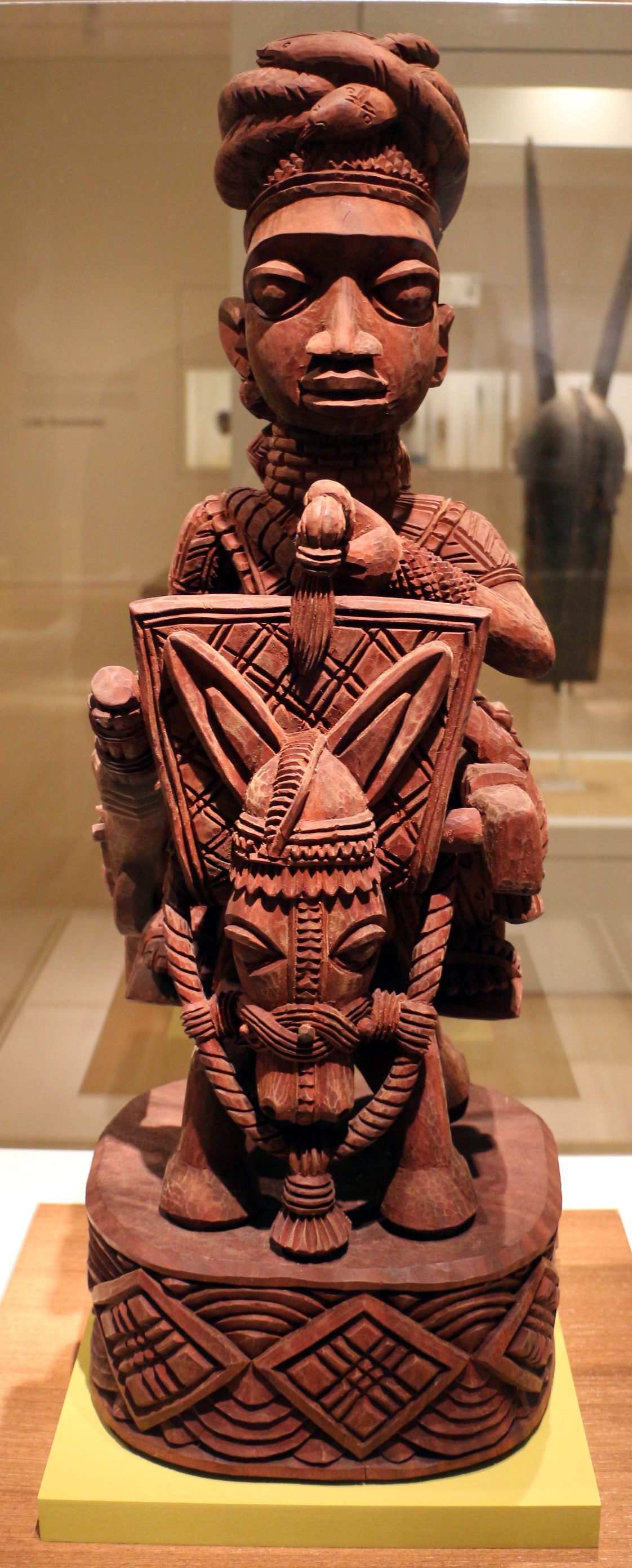
Cavalry Sculpture by Lamidi Fakeye

Fakeye was born on 1925 in Ila Orangun, Nigeria. He first carved a sculpture in 1938 at that point he was an apprentice under the auspice of his father. In 1949, he began to be an apprentice with the master sculptor George Bamidele Arowoogun.

== Career ==
In 1955, he went to work at Holy Cross Primary School in Lagos, Nigeria as an art instructor. His first solo exhibition was in 1960 and took place at the British Council in Nigeria. In 1962, he was named the artist-in-residence at Western Michigan University in Kalamazoo, Michigan. By 1964, he was elected president of the Society of Professional Artists of Nigeria, the same year that his exhibition opened at the United States Information Service in Nigeria. In 1971, there was an exhibition that showed three generations of Fakeye woodcarvers in Ibadan, Nigeria. He was appointed to the Faculty of Arts, University of Ile-Ife in 1978. In 1989, he served as the artist-in-residence at a number of universities in cities such as Cleveland and Pittsburgh. He published his autobiography in 1996 and had a retrospective exhibit at Hope College in Holland, Michigan. A retrospective exhibition of his life's work was held at the Smithsonian in 1999 and some of his artwork is being housed by Johfrim Art and Design Studio.

== Awards ==
- 1989: Awarded Oyo State, Nigeria, Special Merit Award
- 1999: Appointed Kellogg Visiting Artist for Michigan
- 2008: Named a UNESCO Living Human Treasure.

== Movie ==
In 2011, a movie was made about Fakeye's life called Lamidi Olonade Fakeye: The Life of a Master Carver directed by Joe Reese and written by Elizabeth Morton.

== Died ==
Fakeye died on December 25, 2009, in Ile-Ife, Nigeria. His death was due to complications following prostate-cancer surgery.
