= Joseph Folahan Odunjo =

Nigerian writer, teacher and politician (1904–1980)

Chief Joseph Folahan Odunjo
- Born: 1904; Abeokuta, Nigeria
- Died: 1980 (aged 75–76)
- Education: London Institute of Education
- Occupations: Novelist; poet; teacher; politician
- Writing career
- Period: 1943–1970s
- Genres: Yoruba language Children's literature: language texts; novel; poetry; drama
- Notable works: Alawiye (series); Kuye

Chief Joseph Folahan Odunjo (1904–1980) was a Nigerian writer, educator and politician best known for his works in Yoruba children's literature.

== Early life and education ==
Odunjo was born in Ibara, Abeokuta in 1904. He was educated at St Augustine's Primary School, Abeokuta, the Catholic Higher Elementary Training School and the London Institute of Education.

== Teaching and Writing career ==
Odunjo commenced his teaching career as the schoolmaster of the Catholic Training College, Ibadan from 1924 till 1927 and was later the headmaster of his alma mater, St Augustine's, Abeokuta. As a teacher, he formed the Federal Association of Catholic Teachers to negotiate with the Catholic missions on behalf of mission teachers. Odunjo was a teacher and headmaster of various Catholic Schools from the 1940s to the 1950s. His printed work in 1958 was one of the early written works of the language. He wrote several novels, plays, poems and texts in the Yoruba language. His published works later became a source of inspiration for future writers. He was an active member of the Yoruba Orthography Committees of 1966 and 1969. He was also affiliated with the Nigeria Union of Teachers for a number of years.

== Politics ==
In 1951, he won a seat to the Western House of Assembly and later became the region's first minister of Land and Labour. He was a president of the Egbado Union, and also held the chieftaincy title of the Asiwaju of Egbaland.

== Death ==
Chief Odunjo died in 1980.

== Selected works ==
=== Poetry ===
- Ise ni Ogun Ise ("Work is the antidote for poverty")
- Toju Iwa re Oremi ("Watch your behaviour, my friend")
- Akójopò ewì alâdùn (1961)

=== Novels ===
- Omo oku orun (1964; "The deceased woman's daughter")
- Kuye ISBN 978-978-148-016-4 (1978)

=== Textbook ===
- Aláwìíyé Yoruba Readers (Fun awọn ọmọde ati awọn agbà ti o nkọ́ iwe Yoruba ni kikà: Yoruba language comprehensive learning text series) ISBN 978-0-582-63865-5 (1975)
