= Egba people =

Yoruba subgroup

The Egba people are a subgroup of the Yoruba people, an ethnic group of western Nigeria, a majority of whom are from the central part of Ogun State, that is Ogun Central Senatorial District.

Ogun Central Senatorial District comprises six local government areas: Abeokuta North, Abeokuta South, Ewekoro, Ifo, Obafemi Owode and Odeda local governments. Other Egba are located in Lagos West, Lagos East, Oyo North, and Oyo South senatorial zones.

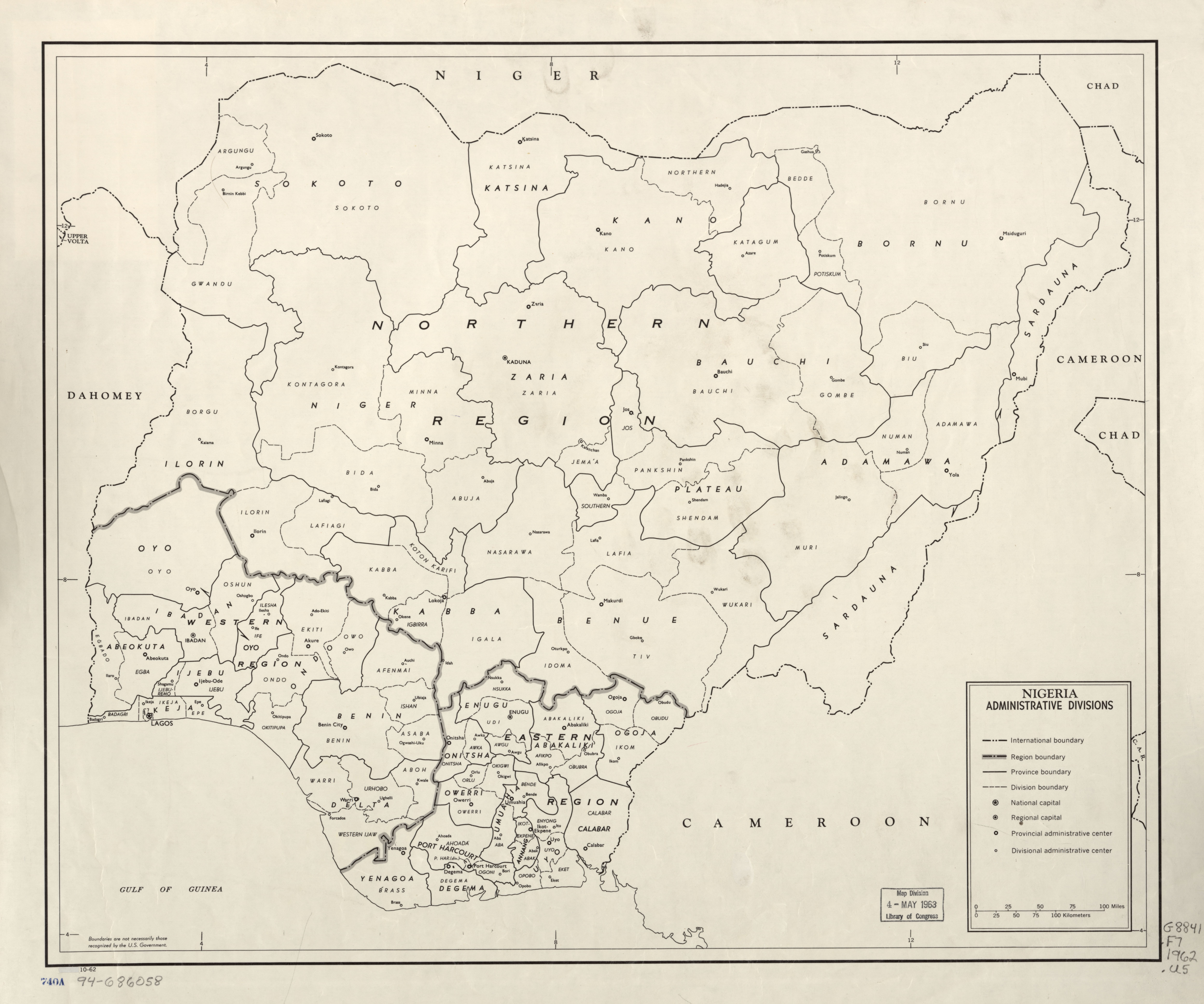
Nigeria, administrative divisions. LOC 94686058

Before the creation of the Southern Nigeria Protectorate, Egba territory and people is bordered by the Ketu (Benin) in the West, the Lagos Colony in south, Ijebu in the east, and Oyo, Ibadan and Isoya near Ile Ife in the north. The people are directly connected to the Ogun River, but detached from the swampy coast of Lagos. Through the Egba land, there are direct routes to other Yoruba towns, including Lagos, Ibadan, Ijebu-Ode, Ketu (Benin), and Porto Novo (Àjàṣẹ́) in the Benin Republic.

== Etymology ==
The origination of the word "Egba" is disputed. The first meaning may come from the word Ẹ̀gbálugbó, meaning wanderers towards the forest, and this comes from the fact that the ancestors of the Egba people came from the region of the Oyo Empire to the "Egba Forest" and formed what we now know as the city of Abeokuta. The "Egbalugbo" were in conjunction with the Ẹ̀gbáluwẹ or Ẹ̀gbálodó, meaning the wanderers towards the river, who later shortened their name to "Egbado," another subethnic group of the Yoruba. Another possible meaning may come from the word Ẹsẹ̀gbá, the title of a chief which led several groups of the Egba to their present location.

== History ==
The Egba group, originally under the Oyo Empire, became independent following the spectacular collapse of Oyo in the first half of the 19th century. Wars with the Dahomey, in which the Egba were successful partly due to the protection afforded by the Olumo Rock, led to the founding of the city of Abeokuta, which literally means "under the rock".

A short introductory expose of The Egbas in Egba dialect by a native speaker

The Egba nation is made up of the following subdivisions: the Ake, Owu, Oke Ona and Gbagura, each with its own king. (Historically, the Egba nation is made up of these four divisions; Ibara, though geographically located in Abeokuta as well, is part of Yewaland.) During colonial rule the British recognised the Alake (or King of Ake) as the paramount ruler of the whole clan and their territory, and so, his successor is now referred to as the Alake of Egbaland. The titles of the kings of the aforementioned subdivisions are therefore Alake of Egbaland, Oshile of Oke Ona, Agura of Gbagura, and Olowu of Owu, in order of settlement and seniority in the Egba nation.

It is worthy of note that the original town and settlement of the Egba nation in Egbaland was under and around Olumo Rock, which is in the Ikija/Ikereku area of the Egba Oke Ona, The Jagunna of Itoko, an Oke Ona chief, is the high priest of Olumo. Olumo Rock is in the territory of and under the control of the Itokos.

Another reference name for Abeokuta by the founding fathers is Oko Adagba (Adagba's Farm) in reference to the hunter that discovered Olumo Rock. Adagba went hunting in search of game animals from the Obantoko township where his fellow Itoko citizens were stationed while wandering for a settlement. He then came across the mountain.

Egbaland was where Henry Townsend lived, and was also the home of the first newspaper in Nigeria (Iwe Iroyin). Its people went on to serve as the first of the many Nigerian nations (until recently, the only one of them) to have an anthem.

== Egba anthem ==
Lori oke o'un petele
Ibe l'agbe bi mi o
Ibe l'agbe to mi d'agba oo
Ile ominira

Chorus: Maa yo, maa yo, maa yo o; l'Ori Olumo; Maa yo, maa yo, maa yo o; l'Ori Olumo

Abeokuta ilu Egba
N ko ni gbagbe e re
N o gbe o l'eke okan mi
Bii ilu odo oya
Emi o f'Abeokuta sogo
N o duro l'ori Olumo
Maayo l'oruko Egba ooo
Emi omoo Lisabi
E e

Chorus: Maa yo, maa yo, maa yo o; l'Ori Olumo; Maa yo, maa yo, maa yo o; l'Ori Olumo

Emi o maayo l'ori Olumo
Emi o s'ogoo yi l'okan mi
Wipe ilu olokiki o
L'awa Egba n gbe

Chorus: Maa yo, maa yo, maa yo o; l'Ori Olumo; Maa yo, maa yo, maa yo o; l'Ori Olumo

== Traditional Attire ==
- Men:
  - Trousers, Kembe/sokoto
  - Top, Buba and Agbada
  - Cap, Fila (abeti aja)
- Women:
  - Wrapper (Iro)
  - Blouse (Buba)
  - Headgear /Headtie (Gele)
  - Other: Ipele – Piece of cloth placed on the shoulder or wrapped around the waist

== Notable individuals ==
- Oba Sir Ladapo Samuel Ademola, the Alake of Abeokuta, Ademola II 1920 to 1962
- The Hon. Adegboyega Edun, clergyman, teacher, principal and government administrator; the Secretary of the Egba United Government
- Oba Samuel Adesina Gbadebo, Okukenu III, 2nd Alake of Egba Kingdom 1962-1971
- Chief Moshood Kashimawo Olawale Abiola, businessman and politician
- Amb. Akin Fayomi, diplomat, ambassador to France, Monaco, Liberia
- Chief Olusegun Obasanjo, President of Nigeria from 1999 to 2007
- Chief Ebenezer Olasupo Obey-Fabiyi, musician and evangelist
- Mr. Olufela Olusegun Oludotun Ransome-Kuti, musician and activist
- Mr. Francis Albert Shodolamu Ogunmuyiwa, judicial official and sports administrator
- Chief Olufunmilayo Ransome-Kuti, human rights activist and the "Mother of the Nation"
- Prince (Ọ́mọ̀ Ọba) Yemisi Adedoyin Shyllon, lawyer, member of the Nigerian Bar Association, art collector, philanthropist, founder of OYASAF and Yemisi Shyllon Museum of Art
- Reverend Oludotun Israel Ransome-Kuti, clergyman, teacher and principal (April 30, 1891 – April 6, 1955)
- Prof. Olikoye Ransome-Kuti, pediatrician, activist, and health minister (30 December 1927 – 1 June 2003)
- Chief Ernest Shonekan, Interim President of Nigeria, 26 August 1993 – 17 November 1993
- Prof. Wole Soyinka, author, activist and Nobel laureate
- Chief F. R. A. Williams S.A.N., a lawyer.
- Chief Bola Tinubu, politician who is the 16th president of Nigeria (since 2023), a former governor of Lagos State (1999-2007), and senator for Lagos West in the Third Republic
- Mr. Adewale Oke Adekola, civil engineer, academic, author, and administrator
- Pastor Tunde Bakare, lawyer and pastor
- Mr. Tunde Kelani, cinematographer and director
- Mr. Segun Odegbami, footballer
- The Rt. Hon. Dimeji Bankole, speaker of Nigeria's House of Representatives
- Ms. Bukola Elemide, alias Asa, a singer
- Mr. Olu Jacobs, actor
- Sir Shina Peters, musician
- Alhaji Waheed Ayinla Yusuf (Omowura), a musician
- Prince Bola Ajibola, retired world court judge
- Chief Simeon Adebo, lawyer and diplomat
- Chief Fela Sowande, composer
- Chief J.F. Odunjo, Yoruba literary icon, writer of the Alawiye series
- Mr. Tunde Lemo, CBN deputy governor
- Mr. John Fashanu, footballer
- Mr. Femi Kuti, musician
- Mr. Seun Kuti, musician
- Mr. Made Kuti, musician
- Mr. Clarence Peters, music video director
- Mr. Ebun Oloyede, actor
- Senator Ibikunle Amosun, governor of Ogun state from 2011 to 2019
- Chief Olusegun Osoba, journalist and politician, governor of Ogun state from 1999 to 2003
- Ms. Zainab Balogun, actress and model
- Prof. Adeoye Lambo, medical professor, one-time Vice Chairman of the World Health Organization (WHO)
- Prof. Saburi Biobaku, vice-chancellor of the University of Lagos
- Chief Alaba Lawson, businesswoman and academic

== See also ==
- Egba United Government
