= Ladapo Ademola =

Alake of Abeokuta (1872–1962)

Oba Sir Ladapo Ademola
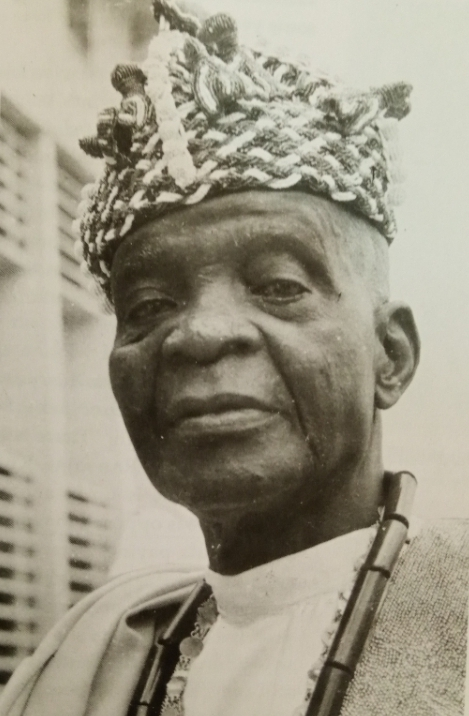

Alake
- Reign: 1920–1962
- Coronation: 24 September 1920
- Predecessor: Oba Gbadebo I
- Successor: Oba Adesina Samuel Gbadebo II
- Born: 1872; Abeokuta
- Died: December 27, 1962 (aged 89–90)
- Burial: December 31, 1962
- Spouses: Olori Tejumade Alakija Ademola, Lady Ademola
- Issue: Omoba Sir Adetokunbo Ademola and Omoba Adenrele Ademola, amongst others
- Father: Oba Ademola I
- Mother: Olori Hannah Adeyombo Ademola

Oba Sir Ladapo Samuel Ademola KBE, CMG (1872–1962), also known as Ademola II, was the Alake of Abeokuta from 1920 to 1962. Before he was crowned Alake, Ademola was involved in the affairs of the Egba United Government. As a member of the Egba council, he was a leading participant in negotiations with the Lagos State colonial government in 1889 for the rights to construct railway tracks passing through Egbaland. In 1904 he travelled with Alake Gbadebo to the U.K., where they were received by King Edward VII. He succeeded Oba Gbadebo in 1920 with overwhelming votes from the Egba council.

One of the earliest Nigerian traditional rulers to own a car, he was known to have driven a speed record of over 30 miles from Abeokuta to Ibadan when he traveled to receive the Prince of Wales at Ibadan before the Prince returned to Lagos after a Durbar at Ibadan. Under his headship, the Egba Native Authority continued infrastructural works in Abeokuta started by Gbadebo including road construction and provision of improved electric and water supply in Abeokuta. He was forced to live outside of Abeokuta in 1948 due to tax related demonstrations led by Funmilayo Ransome-Kuti, a member of the regional House of Assembly, but later returned to Abeokuta in 1950.

He was appointed president of the Western House of Chiefs in 1960.

== Early life and career ==
Ademola was born to the royal house of Alake Ademola I and his wife, Ọkọdabi. Through his father, he was a great-grandson of Jibodu, an Alake of Egbaland before the Egba people migrated to Abeokuta. After the death of his father, Ademola I in 1877, he was taken to Lagos to be raised by his aunt. He was educated at the Ake School, Abeokuta and in Lagos, he attended Breadfruit School, Lagos and Forsythe school. After leaving secondary school, he tried his hand in trading and then printing. He trained as a printer under J. Bagan Benjamin in 1888 and later joined John Payne Jackson of the Lagos Weekly Record. In 1890, he was head printer of Jackson's Weekly Record. While in Lagos, he made acquaintances with personalities such as George W. Johnson, a prominent Egba native and advisor to the Alake Gbadebo I, Balogun Majekodunmi, an Ogboni member and Richard Beale Blaize.

In the late 1800s Egba Kingdom was an independent entity under the guidance of a triumvirate, the Alake, the Ogbonis and the Egba United Board of Management. However, the leading chiefs wanted to enhance cooperation between Abeokuta and colonial Lagos. Ademola who had spent the larger part of his life in Lagos became a broker in the development of relationship between Egba chiefs and Governor Henry McCallum. He also played a leading role in negotiations between Lagos and Abeokuta for the passage of railway through Egba country. Ademola was an adviser to McCallum to create the Egba United Government as a replacement for the triumvirate. The new government system consisted of the Alake as head, the three other Egba Obas as members, and the chiefs who held the title of Seriki, Olori Parakoyi, Apena, and Balogun of Christians. In 1901, he was the agent of the Egba United Government in Lagos, however he soon had a falling out with some of its members. Ademola then took to farming as an occupation but the government system which he had supported in Abeokuta gained little popularity among the residents partly because of a new poll tax.

== Alake ==
Ademola was a popular figure among the Egbas resident in Lagos. He was a modern prince who wore English clothes in Lagos and who had followed Gbadebo to England to visit Edward VII. When Oba Gbadebo I died, Ademola contested the throne against Daniel Lajide, Daniel Mann, the Losi of Ake and Lipede Jibodu. The support of prominent Ogbonis and Egba chiefs such as J.K. Coker, the executor of the late Alake's will, and Alfa Bisiriyu Giwa, a prominent Muslim leader in Egbaland, contributed heavily to his election as Alake in July 1920. His reign started with Ademola filling the vacant chieftaincy titles with his allies. He also created a committee of 24 elders to visit Egba villages and act as his envoys to the villages. In 1922, colonial soldiers stationed in Abeokuta as a result of the aftermath of the Adubi war left and in 1924, his administration was given control of the police, prison and other departments taken over by Lagos during the period of the war. He also continued with public works in Abeokuta and gained support from the British colonial administration as head of the Native Authority.

=== Tax protest and exile ===
Prior to 1946, Ademola was a friend of both the Rev. Dotun Ransome Kuti and his wife, Chief Funmilayo Ransome Kuti. He was also a patron of the Abeokuta Ladies Club which counted Chief Ransome Kuti as a member. After the war, the relationship between the erstwhile friends became strained when the Rev. Ransome Kuti opened a complaints office to receive grievances against the police and native authority officials, two bodies under the control of the Alake. In addition, Funmilayo Ransome Kuti also co-founded a new women's union in Abeokuta. Among the union's prominent agitations were the exclusion of direct female taxation of Abeokuta women and representation of women in local governance. Before the colonial policy of indirect rule, women in Abeokuta had enjoyed some form of representation in government and were not taxed directly. They had a woman leader who held the title of Iyalode, a title that held political importance. The title was allowed to lapse during the era of indirect rule, and so the Egba women found themselves unrepresented in the Egba government for the first time in generations.

The women's union galvanized the market women in the town and by 1950, it had reached a membership figure of 20,000. From 1946 to 1948, the union led intermittent protests against the taxation of women, lack of female representation in the Native Authority, war era policies such as quotas and against some of Ademola's business interests. In late 1946, the union and thousands of Abeokuta women protested against increased direct taxation. In November 1947, market women closed down the local markets and staged a protest at the palace of the Alake, blocking the entrance. Another demonstration was held in December, with the women holding vigils at the palace of Ademola. By 1948, the women had compelled Ademola to suspend the taxation of women. The protest also gained the support of the Ogbonis and by the end of 1948, Ademola went into exile to keep the peace in Abeokuta.

He returned in 1950.

=== Centenary celebration ===
Ademola was on the throne when Abeokuta celebrated its centenary in October 1930, which also coincided with his ten-year anniversary. The Egba Native Authority and the British decided to make the occasion a momentous affair. Prior to the event, a call was made for those with Egba ancestry to come to Abeoukuta and celebrate. The festivities included the erection of the Centenary Hall and the dedication of a cenotaph to Sodeke, the founder of Abeokuta. During the festivities, he gave out chieftaincy titles to individuals including the title of Bariyun of Ake to Sir Adeyemo Alakija, his brother-in-law. The festivities were also used as an avenue to support the Alake's sovereignty over Abeokuta with pamphlets written by Ladipo Solanke.

== Sources ==
- Germaine, Jenna (2007). Integrating Egba epistemologies: Writing historical knowledge in colonial Nigeria (Thesis). Dalhousie University.
- Johnson-Odim, Cheryl; Mba, Nina (1997). For Women and the Nation: Funmilayo Ransome-Kuti of Nigeria. Univ. of Illinois Press.
