= Olumo Rock =

Mountain in Nigeria

Olumo Rock is a mountain in south-western Nigeria. It is located in the city of Abeokuta, Ogun State, and was normally used as a natural fortress during inter-tribal warfare in the 19th century. Its patron spirit is venerated in the Yoruba religion as an orisha. In addition, Olumo Rock is an important paleontological archaeological site that has yielded an outstanding collection of stone tools such as hand axes, artificially shaped spherical rocks, pick-like tools and hammer rocks, dating back approximately 1.5 million years. The name olumo is the combination of two words: "olu" which means god/deity, and "mo" which means moulded.

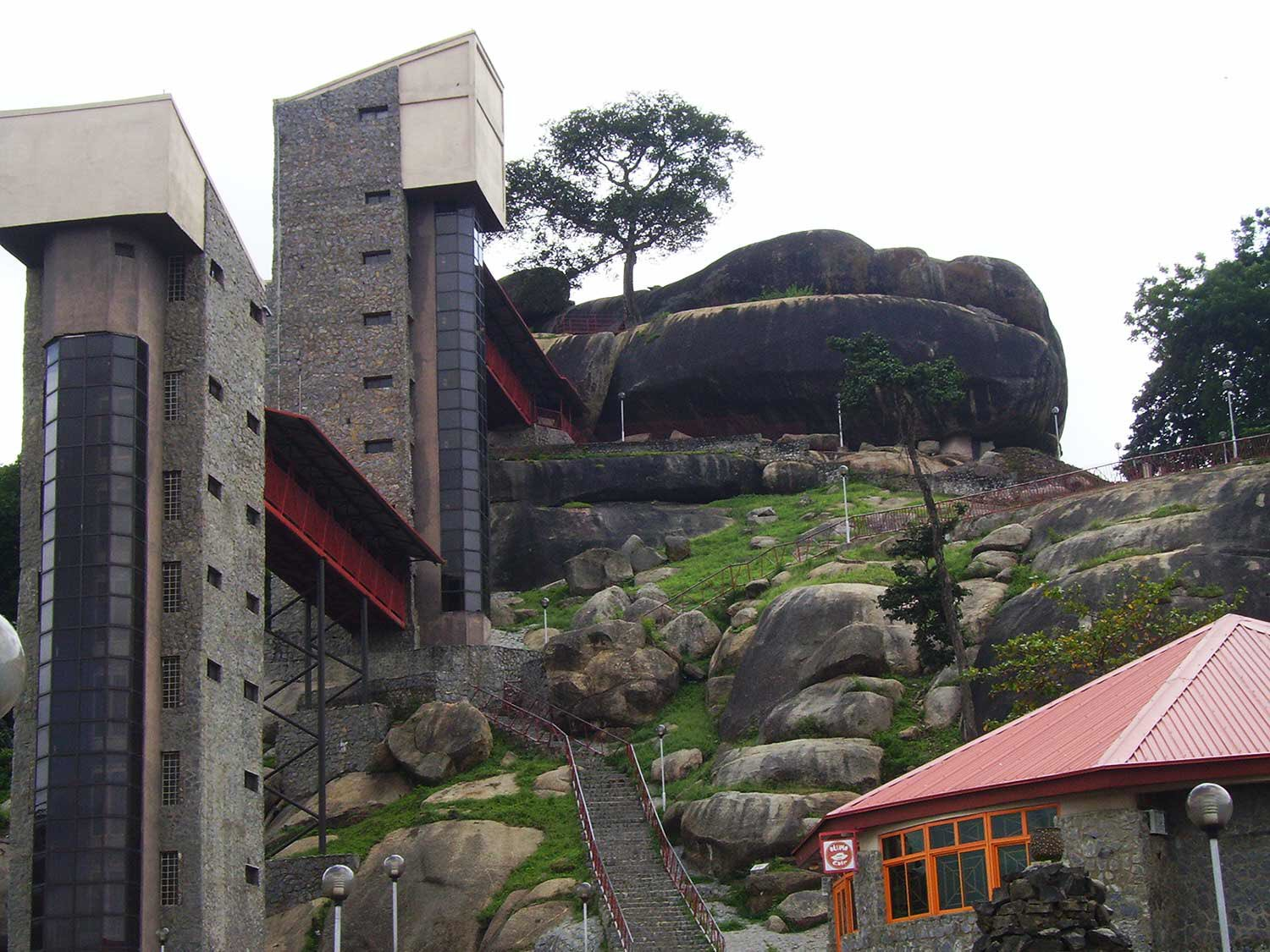

== Tourism ==
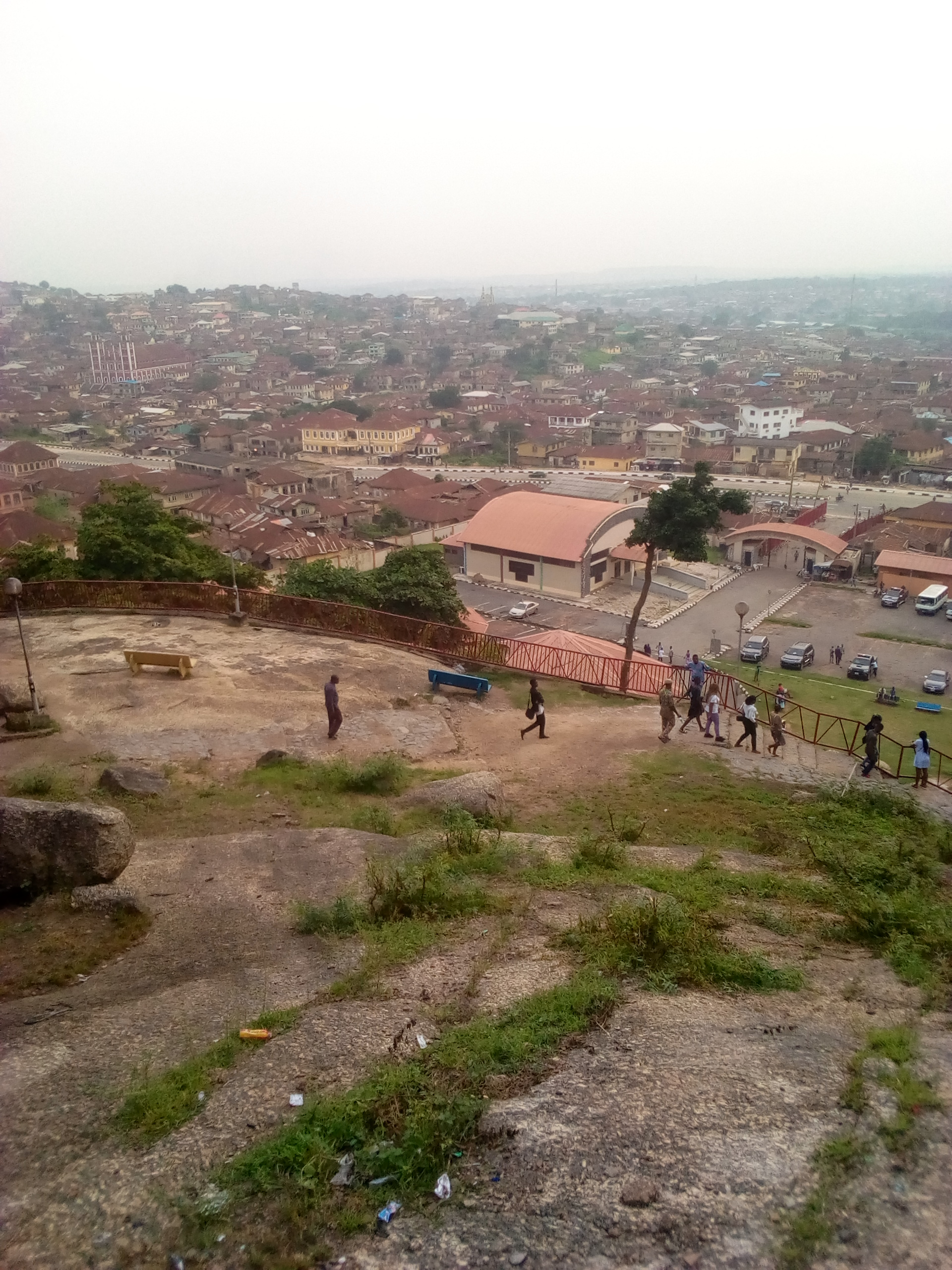
This is a picture of Olumo Rock in Abeokuta, Ogun state. A renowned tourist attraction in Nigeria. It is an historical site.

Olumo Rock is located in the city of Abeokuta, Ogun State, Nigeria. Historically, the rock was a natural fortress for the Egbas during inter-tribal warfare in the 19th century. It provided protection to the Egba people when they needed it, and is now held in high esteem by the members of the clan. The mountain, one of the most popular tourist destinations in Nigeria, sits in the heart of Abeokuta – a name which means “Under the rock” in the Yoruba language. The rock has a height of 137 metres (449 ft) above sea level. Abeokuta was originally inhabited by the Egbas, who the rock provided with sanctuary and gave a vantage point to monitor the enemy’s advance, leading to eventual triumph in war. The town of Abeokuta eventually grew as these new settlers spread out from this location.

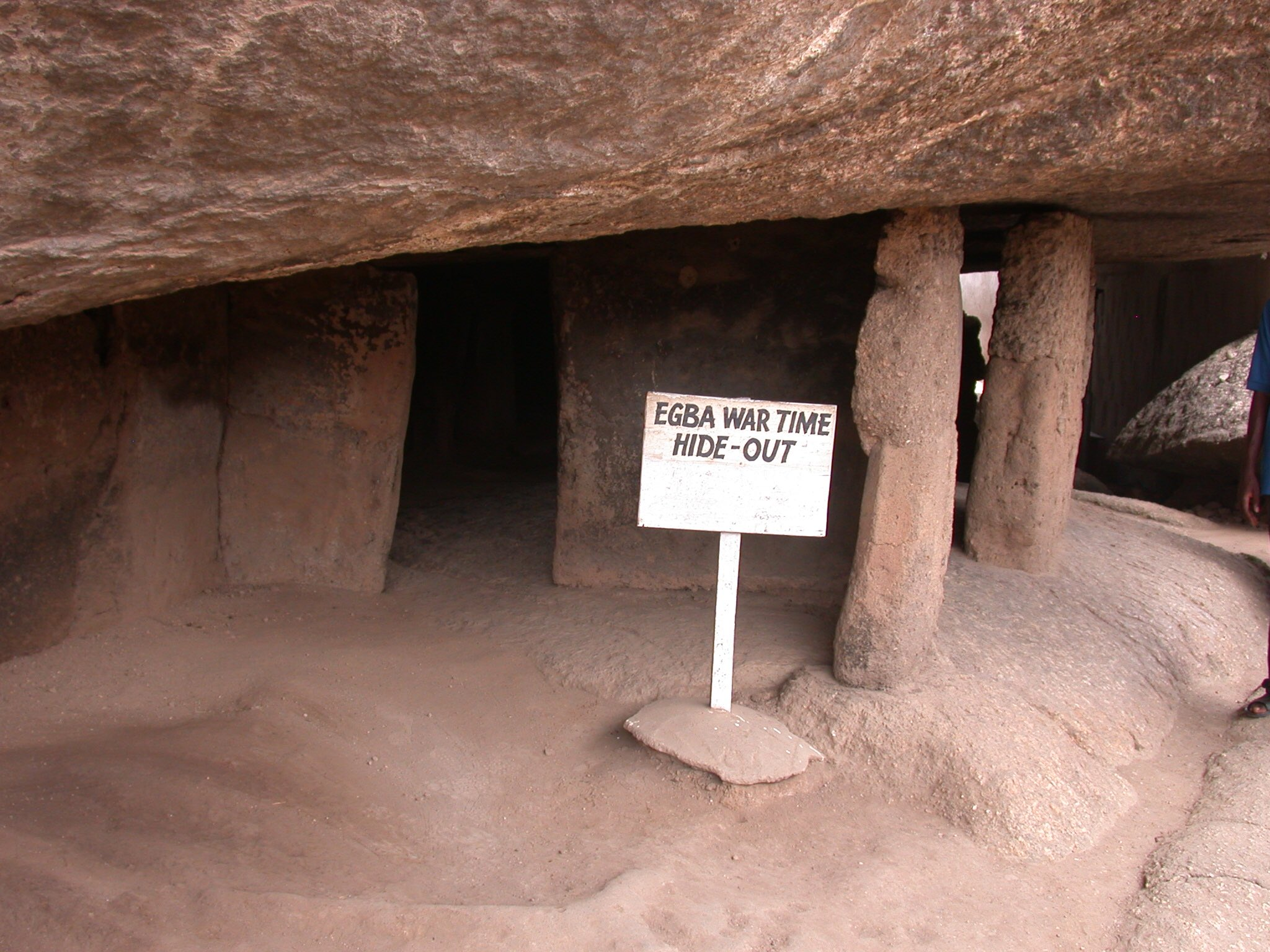

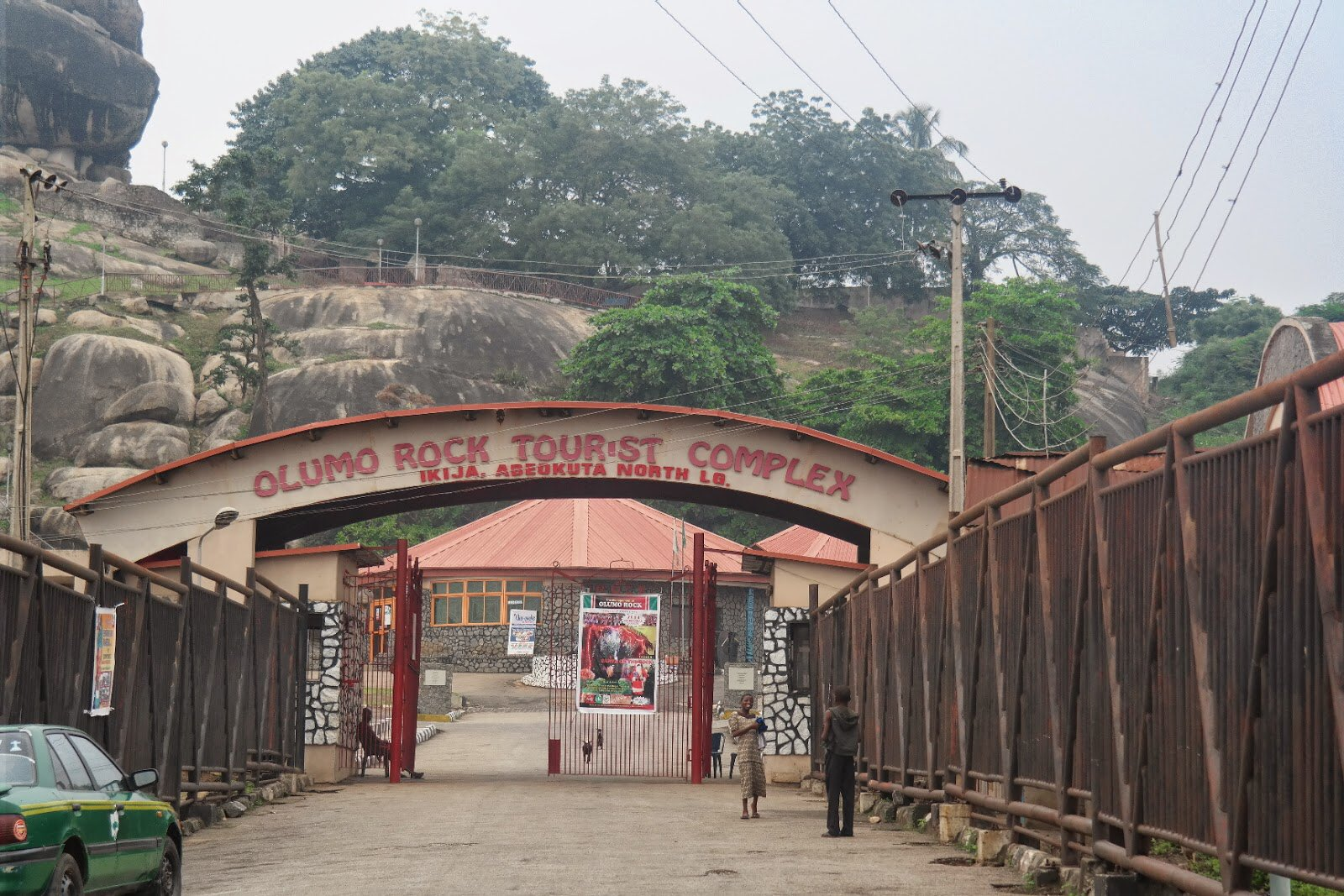
Olumo Rock is located in the ancient city of Abeokuta, Ogun State. Historically, the rock was a natural fortress for the Egbas during inter-tribal warfare in the 19th century.
