= Kunle Filani =

Nigerian educator and artist

Emmanuel Olakunle Filani (born 8 September 1957) is a Nigerian educator and artist. His works are closely identified with the school of thought named Onaism, an art movement that is based on the fusion of the designs, ornamentation and motifs found in traditional Yoruba carvings and textiles with modern art pieces such as drawings and paintings. Filani is also a lecturer and an administrator – he was a provost of the Federal College of Education, Osiele, Abeokuta.

== Early life and education ==
Filani was born 8 September 1957 to a polygamous family, his father Jacob Ogunmoroti Filani was a native of Ikole-Ekiti in Ekiti State, he was a civil servant who worked in the municipal government council while his mother was a teacher. His father died in 1975 when Filani was 17 years old. Due to his father's job, the family lived in various towns when he was a young child. He completed his primary education at Bishop Akinyele Primary School, Ibadan (1967–1969) and St Peter's Primary School, Ikole (1969). He attended Doherty Memorial Grammar School in Ijero Ekiti with his brother, fellow artist Tolu Filani. While in Form 2, the school provided a classroom for students inclined towards artistic activities and subsequently hired an arts teacher to manage the class. He finished secondary education in 1974 and briefly worked for two years as a clerk at the Lafarge Cement plant in Ewekoro. From 1976 to 1980, he studied at Obafemi Awolowo University where he earned a degree in Fine Arts. At Ife, he was taught by some faculty staff that included Babatunde Lawal, Munio Makuchi, Agbo Folarin and Rowland Abiodun. It was at the university he met some of his fellow artists such as Moyo Okediji and Moyo Ogundipe; together they later went on to form the Ona art movement in the late 1980s. He also developed an interest in petro-polystyrene experimentation at Ife. He obtained a Master of Fine Arts degree from the University of Benin, as part of his fulfilment for the completion of the degree, he staged an academic exhibition entitled 'A Trip to Wonderland'. He also developed skills in contrast composition and printmaking. Filani later earned a doctoral degree in Visual Arts from University of Ibadan in 2002.

== Career ==
Filani was a corps member at Kano Teacher's College between 1980 and 1981. He started his career as an art teacher in St Louis School, Owo in 1981. On completion of his M.F.A. studies, he joined the arts faculty of Adeyemi College of Education, Ondo, in 1985. He rose through the ranks to become head of department before leaving the college in 1992 to establish the new arts department in the Federal College of Education, Akoka, Lagos. At Adeyemi College, Filani was involved with the formation of Ona Group. Ona is an artistic concept is focused on re-adaptation and re-interpretation of traditional materials and methods that will culminate in the aesthetic high point of contemporary Yoruba art and design. He had two solo exhibitions during this period – "Coming on Strong", an exhibition of prints, paintings and drawings in August 1989 and "Salute to Patience" in 1991. Between 1992 and 1997, some of his works were shown in group exhibitions in Lagos, including "Best of Ife" in 1993, "On and On" in 1993, "Harvest of Sensation" in 1991 and "Legacy", an exhibition in honor of Irein Wangboje, in 1996. He had a solo exhibition in 1997 named "Patterns of Ona".

He was at a time the dean of the School of Technical Education and Provost, Federal College of Education, Osiele-Abeokuta.

Filani's paintings fall under four categories: figurative expression, landscapes, partially dissected works and completely dissected compositions. A common feature of some of his paintings is the use of decorative linear drawings and patterns.

== Books ==
- Art, design and technology in the 21st century. edited by E.O. Filani ... [et al.] Lagos : Culture and Creative Art Forum (CCAF), 2007.
- Patterns of Culture in Contemporary Yoruba Art. Symphony Books, 2005.

== Personal life ==
Filani married Celestina Omigie in 1988. They attend the Mountain of Fire and Miracles church.
