= Alake of Egbaland (title) =

Royal title in Egbaland

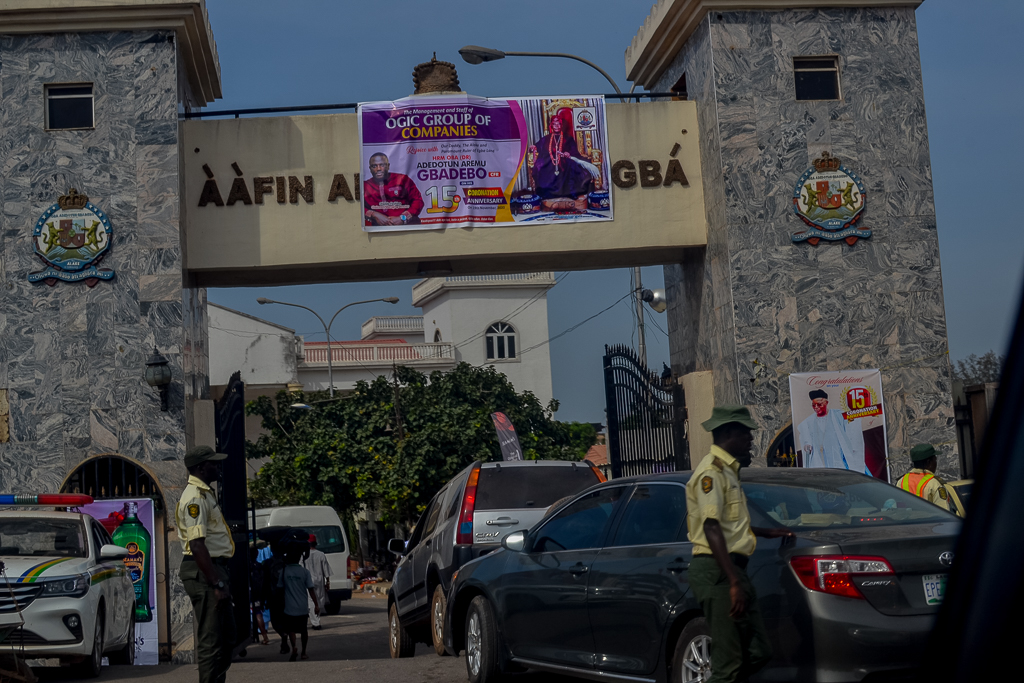
The Alake of Egbaland's palace, Abeokuta

The Alake of Egbaland is the paramount Yoruba king of the Egba, a clan in Abeokuta, Ogun State, southwestern Nigeria. Egba consists of Egba Ake, Oke-Ona and Egba Gbagura.

== Pre-Abeokuta history of the Alake ==
According to oral tradition, the Alake, believed to be a descendant of Oduduwa, was the monarch of the Ake subgroup of the Egba. The Alake was likely under the power and influence of the Alaafin. The Aláké ruled in a region known as "Igbó Ẹ̀gbá," north of present day Abeokuta. There were over 20 kings that ruled Ake before the Ake settled in Abeokuta in 1830. The exact dates of their reigns are still unclear, and many of the names of the supposed kings are linked to oriki or nicknames. The first Alake to rule is said to be Ajalake, who may have ruled sometime in the 15th or 16th century. Laarun, an Alake of Egbaland who ruled during the 18th century, was the great-grandfather of Shomoye, the Bashorun of Egbaland through Laarun's son Lukoye. Lukoye was also the great-grandfather of the first Alake of Egbaland in Abeokuta, Okukenu. Laarun was also a great-grandfather of Alake Jibodu.

Larelu or Lelu Erigi was another Alake of Ake, and reigned sometime in the mid 1700s. He was the grandfather of the Egba warlord and leader Sodeke, through Sodeke's mother Efuwo. Efuwo was also mother to Ọba Okikilu, the last Akale to rule at Igbo-Egba.

Jibodu was the pentultimate Alake in Igbo-Egba, and likely ruled during the turn of the 19th century. Jibodu was a son of Saade, who was a granddaughter of Alake Laarun. Many of Jibodu's descendants became Alake of Egbaland when the Egba moved to Abeokuta.

Okikilu was the last Alake to rule in Igbo-Egba. He was murdered by messengers sometime in the early 1800s during a civil war in the Ake towns of Agbaje. The Egba Ake people soon settled in Abeokuta not too long after his death. Okikilu is believed to be a grandson of Alake

== History of the Alake in Abeokuta ==
Sagbua Okukenu became the first Alake of Egbaland, ruling between 8 August 1854 to 31 August 1862. He was a great-great grandson of Laarun, an ancient Alake. Prior to the appointment of the Sagbua Okukenu in 1846, Shomoye, who was a cousin of Okukenu was installed as regent for one year, between 1845 and 1846. Adekanmbi Somoye was born in Orile-Iporo sometime between 1790 and 1800. His father Jejusimi was a son of Lukoye, who was a son of Laarun, an Alake of Egbaland who ruled sometime in the 18th century. Following the demise of Oba Okukenu in 1862, Shomoye returned to the throne of the Alake of Egbaland as a regent, where he spent four years between 1862 until his death on August 8, 1868. Following this, Oba Ademola I was appointed on 28 November 1869. Ademola was a grandson of Jibodu, an Alake of Egba before the migration to Abeokuta, through his mother Teniade. His rise to throne was bitterly contested with his Oyekan, and supporters of Oyekan, who were primarily the Ogboni chiefs, refused to recognize his rule for many years. He ruled for eight years until his demise on 30 December 1877.

On 1 January 1878, Oba Oyekan was appointed as the Alake of Egbaland. Oyekan was the son of Alake Jibodu. He was quite old when he became king, and he spent only three years on the throne before his demise on 18 September 1881. Thereafter, Oluwaji was appointed on 9 February 1885, and ruled in this capacity for four years, until his death on 27 January 1889. He was from Itoku and was a grandson of Jibodu through his mother Erelu After a two-year vacancy, Oba Oshokalu, a son of Latomi and a grandson of Jibodu, was appointed Alake on 18 September 1891. He ruled in this capacity for seven years until his demise on 11 June 1898. On 8 August 1898 Oba Gbadebo I became the Alake of Egbaland. Gbadebo was a son of the first Alake Okukenu and his wife Efunwunmi. He was born sometime in May or June 1854, when his father was attempting to become the first Alake. He spent twenty-two years on the throne until his death on 28 May 1920. He died at the age of 66 (1854–1920). He was the first Alake to convert to Christianity, which he did shortly before his death. One of his sons, Adesanya Osolake Gbadebo, is the father of Gbadebo III, the current Alake of Egbaland. Following the demise of Oba Gbadebo I in 1920, Oba Ladapo Ademola II became the new Alake on September 27, 1920. He was the son of the past Alake of Egbaland Ademola. The Egba people were initially hesitant to Ademola II's appointment as he had converted to Christianity and was educated in western schools in Lagos. He ruled for 42 years, two of which were spent in exile between 1948 and December 1950. After his death on 27 December 1962, the throne was vacant for one year and on 12 August 1963, Oba Adesina Samuel Gbadebo II was appointed as the new Alake of Egbaland. He was a son of Oba Gbadebo I. After the death of Adesina Samuel Gbadebo on 26 October 1971, Samuel Oyebade Lipede became the king. Lipede was a son of Adebowale Lipede, who was a grandson of Adeluola, a daughter of Oba Jibodu He ruled in this capacity for 33 years until his demise in February 2005, which led to the appointment of Adedotun Aremu Gbadebo III

List of Alakes of Ake in Igbo-Egba, pre-1830:

Rulers title (Alake)
Alake Dada Ajalake	c.16th century
Alake Arokonu (may be the same person as Ajalake)
Alake Ofitete-na-obinrin
Alake A-fi-egungun-tenna
Alake Oyidiyidi-lu-ote
Alake Akurunwon dari ile
Alake Oliyun Arowo
Alake Agbarinmogi
Alake Lupo Mosuleka	mid-late 1600s
Alake Laro d'agbabi oba
Alake Mu'jawu Nepo osi
Alake Larun Abenoku Asolagege	from early to mid-1770s
Alake Larelu (or Lelu) Erigi afinnikan af'owoseso	mid-1700s
Alake Abara-Onika-mogun
Alake Ose-firiro-gbe-edun
Alake Gbogan Abatimo
Alake Osifunwatan ara Igbeti
Alake Gbongbo-bi-irin Atesiwaju-agija
Alake Jibodu Oluyemo Asaramapa	c. 1800 - c. 1815
Alake Okikilu Agunloye-bi-oyinbo	c. 1815-1821

List of the Alakes of Egbaland in Abeokuta, originally of Ake:

Rulers title (Alake)
Alake Somoye (1st time) -Regent	(1845-1846)
Alake Sagbuwa Okunkenu	(28 August 1854 till 31 August 1862)
Alake Somoye (2nd time) -Regent	1862–1866
Alake Ademola I	(28 November 1869 till 30 December 1877)
Alake Oyekan	(1 January 1878 till 18 September 1881)
Alake Oluwaji	(9 February 1885 till 27 January 1889)
Alake Osokalu	(18 September 1891 till 11 June 1898)
Alake Gbadebo I	(8 August 1898 till 8 May 1920)
Alake Ladapo Ademola II	(10 July 1920 till 27 December 1962)
Alake Adesina Samuel Gbadebo II	(12 August 1963 till 26 October 1971)
Alake Samuel Oyebade Lipede I	(5 August 1972 till 3 February 2005
Alake Adedotun Aremu Gbadebo III	(2 August 2005 till present)

== See also ==
- Egba Alake
