= Nike Davies-Okundaye =

Nigerian batik and textile designer (born 1951)

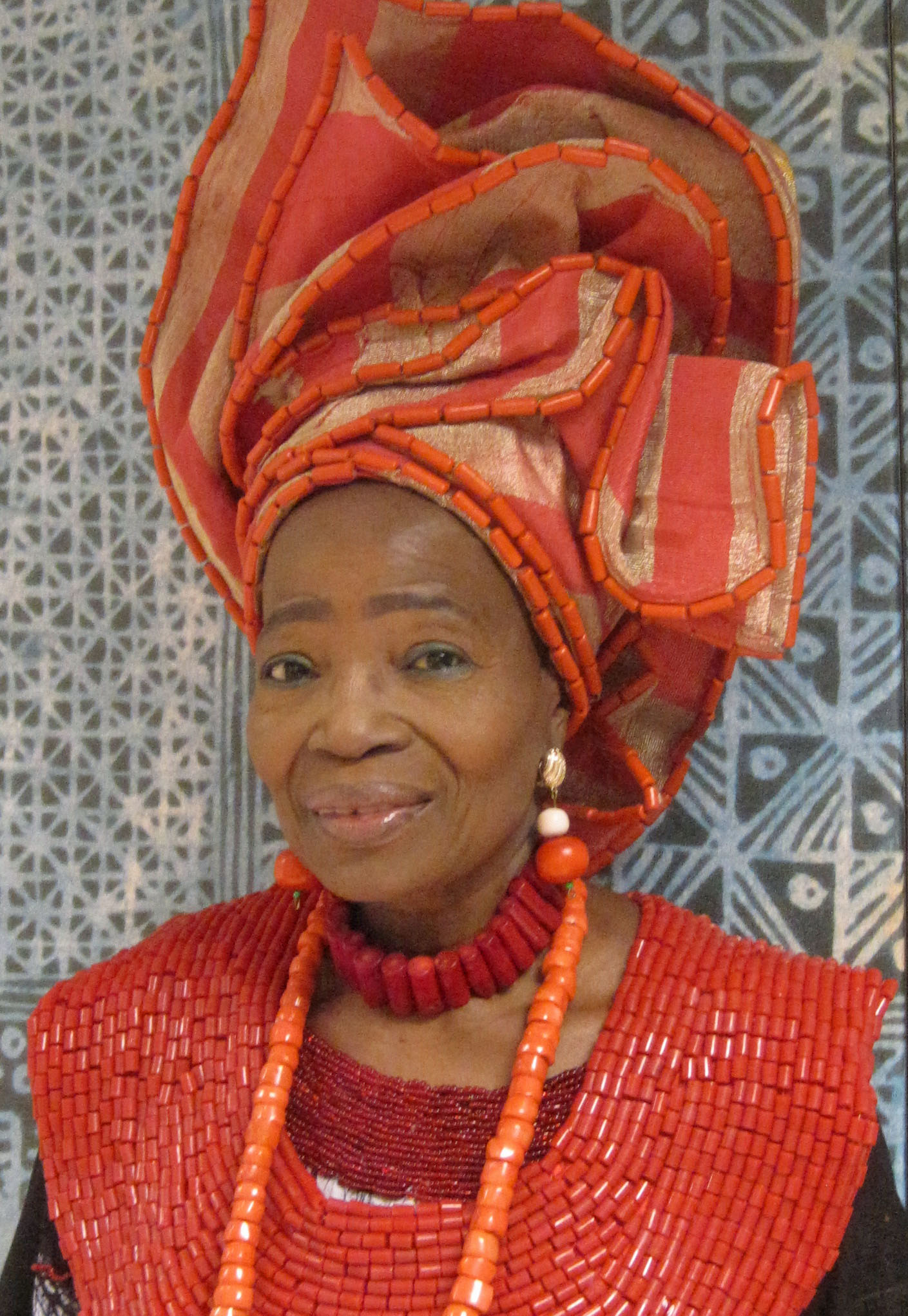
- Okundaye in 2019
- Born: Nike Okundaye; 23 May 1951 (age 75); Ogidi, Kogi State, Nigeria
- Known for: Textile artist
- Spouse: Twins Seven Seven (divorced)
- Website: www.nikeartfoundation.com

Chief Nike Davies-Okundaye (born 1951), also known as Nike Okundaye, Nike Twins Seven Seven and Nike Olaniyi, is a Nigerian Yoruba and adire textile designer. She is best known as an artist for her cloth work and embroidery pieces.

== Early life ==
Okundaye was born 23 May 1951 in Ogidi, Kogi State, in North-Central Nigeria, and was brought up amidst the Yoruba traditional weaving and dyeing as practiced in her hometown. Her parents and great grandmother were musicians and craftspeople, who specialized in the areas of cloth weaving, adire making, indigo dyeing and leather. She learned how to use the loom to produce cloth during the time she lived with her great grandmother Ibitola (“Red Woman”). She spent part of her early life in Osogbo, Western Nigeria, modern-day Osun State. Growing up in Osogbo, which is recognized as a major centre for art and culture in Nigeria, young Okundaye was exposed to the indigo dyeing and adire production that dominated her informal training.

== Career ==
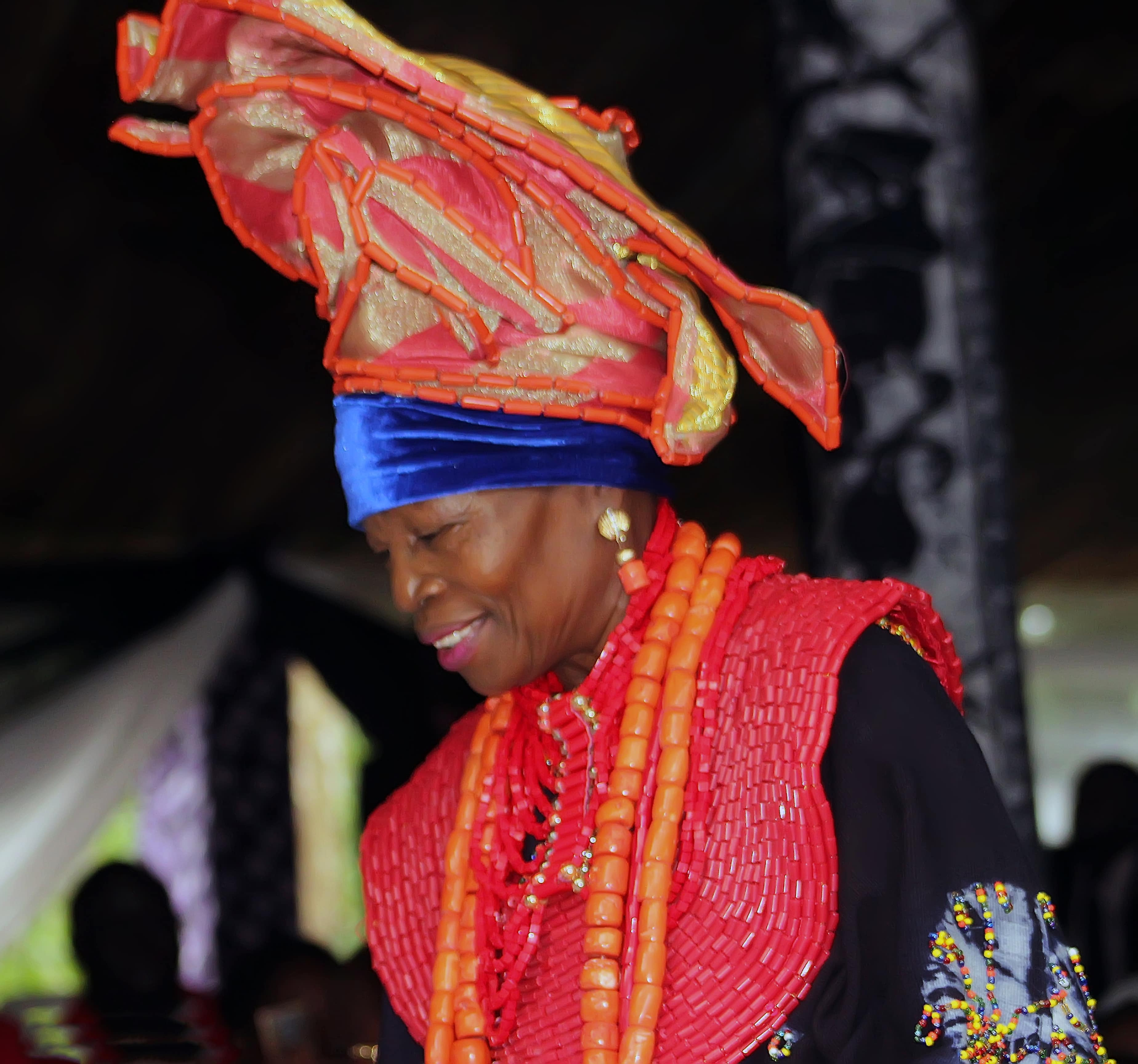
Nike Davies-Okundaye

Over the past twenty years, Okundaye has conducted workshops on traditional Nigerian textiles for audiences in the United States and Europe. She had her first solo exhibition at the Goethe Institute, Lagos, in 1968. She is the founder and director of four art centres that offer free training to more than 150 young artists in visual, musical and performing arts, comprising more than 7,000 artworks.

Finding that the traditional methods of weaving and dyeing that had been her original inspiration were fading in Nigeria, Okundaye set about launching a revival of this aspect of Nigerian culture, building art centres offering free courses for young Nigerians to learn traditional arts and crafts.

As art historian John Peffer states, "One thing shared by many of the latest generation of African artists in the diaspora – those who have been successful on the art circuit – is that their work critiques the very burden of representation that is also the condition of their visibility." In her view, the traditional art of Adire Eleko is only possible because of a specific Nigerian heritage of passing knowledge from one generation to the next. In a video interview published by Nubia Africa, Okundaye states that "school can only teach what they [art students] already know." According to a CNBC Africa interview, she trained more than 3,000 young Nigerians for free and she continues to help by funding many poor to establish their small businesses and art workshops in different parts of Nigeria. Nike Davies-Okundaye has continued to use the Nike Art Gallery as a centre for art education and women’s empowerment. In 2024, the gallery partnered with the United States Embassy in Nigeria to organise a free workshop in Osogbo that trained approximately 35 young women in tie-dyeing, bead-making and Aso-oke weaving.

Okundaye's adire and batik textiles use visual themes taken from Yoruba history and mythology, as well as visual themes inspired by her own life experiences and dreams. According to Kim Marie Vaz, folklore often intermingles with personal experiences to express disheartening subjects regarding female suffering. Folklore that Okundaye was exposed to through evening stories spoken by the village elder, addressing social issues centred on female suffrage, in which she uses folklore figures to express her concerns on female suffering through her batiks that portray the goddess Osun (i.e., "Mother of Africa") communicating on ideologies and social norms that place females in constrained positions.

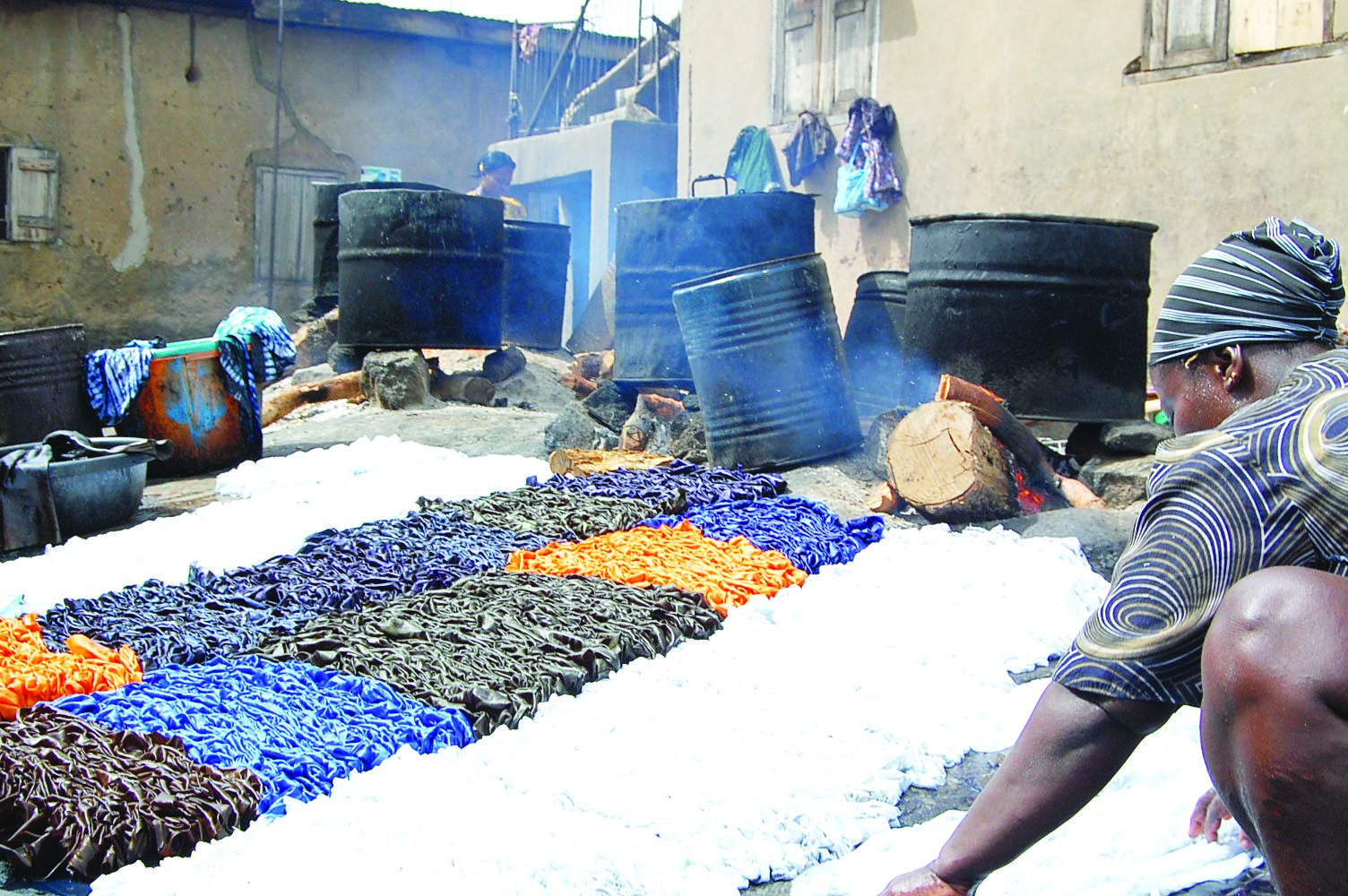
Adire textile staining.

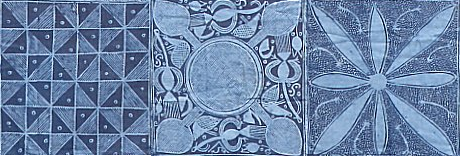
Adire Eleko example.

Okundaye strives to improve lives of disadvantaged women in Nigeria through art. She teaches the unique techniques of indigo cloth-dyeing (Adire) to rural women at her workshop in south-west Nigeria. She hopes to revive the centuries-old tradition and the lives of these women. Adire – that which is tied and dyed – is native to the Southwest region of Nigeria. The freehand dyeing is sometimes known as "Adire Eleko". "Adire" refers to indigo dye, and "Eleko" refers to the boiled cassava, lime, and alum-resist technique used to create patterns. There is a strong tendency to keep dyeing recipes and methods secret from inquisitive outsiders. Okundaye chooses to continuously reference adire patterns in her artwork because adire is a women's art and was taught to her by her mother. Adire pattern motifs were traditionally passed down from mother to daughter, and the designs themselves have virtually not changed in form over time.

Okundaye was featured on CNN International's African Voices, which features Africa's most engaging personalities, exploring their lives and passions. Her painting is permanently displayed at the Smithsonian Museum as of 2012, and her work is also part of the collection of the Gallery of African Art and the British Library in London and at Johfrim Art and Design Studio. She holds the chieftaincy titles of the Yeye Oba of Ogidi-Ijumu and the Yeye Tasase of Oshogbo.

Okundaye was included in the 2019 show I Am… Contemporary Women Artists of Africa at the Smithsonian's National Museum of African Art in Washington, D C. In April of the same year, she was conferred with an honorary doctorate by Rhodes University during its annual graduation ceremonies.

== Personal life ==
Okundaye has two sons (Olabayo David Olaniyi and Mofolorunso Olaniyi) and four daughters (Oluwaseyi Awoyomi, Caroline Davies, Allyson Aina Davies, and Ameh Okundaye). She was previously married to fellow Nigerian artist, Prince Twins Seven Seven, but their marriage ended in divorce. She later married David John Davies and they had two daughters. Her current marriage is to Reuben Okundaye, Nigerian ex-police commissioner and the father of her youngest child.

== Published sources ==
A book about Okundaye was written by Kim Marie Vaz, The Woman with the Artistic Brush: A Life History of Yoruba Batik Artist Nike Okundaye.

== Award and Honours ==
Okundaye is the recipient of honours from numerous esteemed cultural institutions. She has served on the UNESCO Committee of the Intangible Nigerian Heritage Project. She has been honoured as the CEPAN Foundation Art Icon of the year. Okundaye has given workshops and lectures at universities world over.

In 2024, She was given the U.S. Exchange Alumni Lifetime Achievement Award to recognise her significant contributions to the arts and longstanding cultural relationship between the U.S. and Nigeria.

Okundaye was honoured, along with Nobel laureate Wole Soyinka, by the U.S. government through the Pennsylvania House of Representatives and Senate, for their contributions to art in Nigeria and globally, at the unveiling of the African Cultural Festival 2025 held at the Pennsylvania State Capitol.

== See also ==
- Nike Art Gallery
