= Adedotun Aremu Gbadebo III =

Alake of Egba, Nigeria

Alake Adédọ̀tun Aremu Gbadébò lll (Okukenu lV)
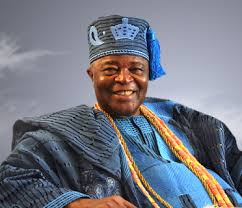

Alake of Egba
- Incumbent
- Assumed office 2 August 2005 - present
- Preceded by: Oba Oyebade Lipede

Personal details
- Born: 14 September 1943 (age 83) Abeokuta

Adedotun Aremu Gbadebo III (born 14 September 1943) is the current Alake of Egba, a clan in Abeokuta, Nigeria. He has ruled since 2 August 2005.

== Early life ==
Gbadebo was born on 14 September 1943, into the Laarun Ruling House. He is a grandson of the sixth Alake of Egbaland, Oba Gbadebo, who ruled from 1898 to 1920, and is a nephew of Oba Gbadebo II. His great grandfather was Okukenu, the first Alake of Egbaland. Through Okukenu, Gbadebo's lineage traces back to Laarun, an Alake of Ake who ruled in the early 1700s. Laarun is Gbadebo's 5x-great-grandfather.

Gbadebo attended the Baptist Boys' High School in Abeokuta and Ibadan Grammar School, then went on to University of Ibadan in 1965, obtaining a Bachelor of Arts degree in 1969. He joined the army in 1969, and attended the Command and Staff College, Jaji from September 1978 to August 1979. He eventually became a Principal Staff Officer to Major-General Tunde Idiagbon, the Chief of Staff at the Supreme Headquarters, Dodan Barracks, from January 1984 to September 1985. He retired from the army as a Colonel.

== Election ==
Gbadebo's election as Alake in August 2005 ended a six-month period of uncertainty about who would succeed the former Alake, Oba Oyebade Lipede, who died on 3 February 2005. He scored 15 out of 23 votes in an election conducted by the Egba kingmakers, defeating eight competitors including his younger brother, Adeleke.

== Dispute ==
In April 2010, a dispute between Gbadebo and the Olu of Igbein, Oba Festus Oluwole Makinde, was taken to the High Court of Ogun State, Abeokuta Judicial Division, Ogun State, Nigeria. The Olu of Igbein was contesting an attempt by the Alake to change his title from Olu of Igbein to Olu of Mowe, a change which would affect his rights to use certain traditional symbols including the Igbein stool.
