= Ransome-Kuti family =

Nigerian political family

Ransome-Kuti
- Nigerian political family
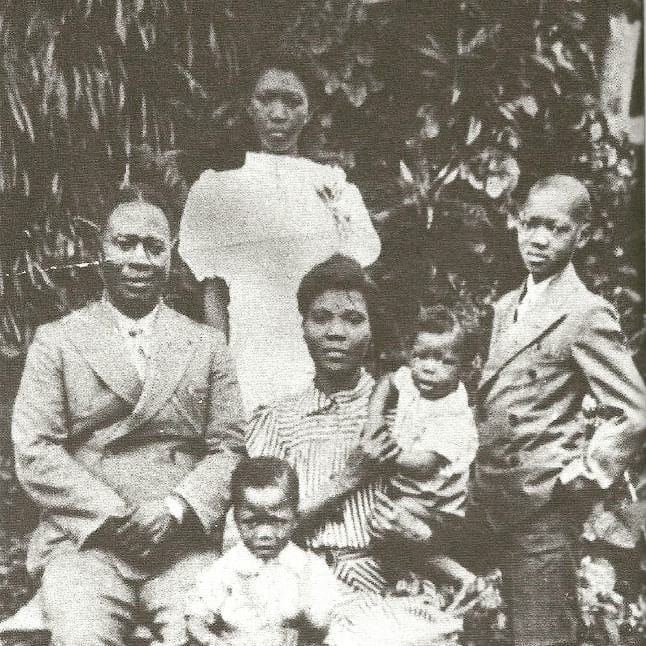
- Ransome-Kuti family c.1940
- Parent house: Oodua
- Current region: Yorubaland
- Origin: Orile Igbein, Egba Forest
- Founded: 1830
- Founder: Likoye Kuti
- Connected families: Jibolu-Taiwo family Soyinka family
- Distinctions: Nobel Prize for Literature; Lenin Peace Prize; Grammy Lifetime Achievement Award; Grand Commander of the Order of the Niger; Member of the Order of the Niger

The Ransome-Kuti family is a Nigerian Yoruba political family noted for its simultaneous contributions to art, religion, education and medicine. It belongs to the Nigerian bourgeoisie, and also has historic links to the Nigerian chieftaincy system.

== History ==
The first member to bear the name Ransome, the Reverend Josiah Jesse "J.J." Ransome-Kuti, adopted it in honour of the Anglican missionary who had first converted his family to Christianity. He followed his father Likoye Kuti — an Egba griot — into the musical vocation, and wrote a series of popular hymns in the Yoruba language while serving as an Anglican cleric.

The descendants of J.J.'s son, the Reverend Israel Oludotun Ransome-Kuti, and Chief Funmilayo Ransome-Kuti include a health minister (who had also served as a university professor), a political activist (who would himself later be adopted as an Amnesty International prisoner of conscience), and six further musicians (including a Grammy Award winner who founded and led a political party and three Grammy nominees).

The Ransome-Kutis have been known to form marital unions with other families of the Yoruba elite: the branch descended from Chief Funmilayo Ransome-Kuti is a sept of the aristocratic Jibolu-Taiwo family of Egbaland by virtue of its descent from her, while the one descended from the Reverend Samuel Ayodele Soyinka, the husband of Grace Eniola Jenkins-Harrison, is related to the royal family of Isara-Remo through him.

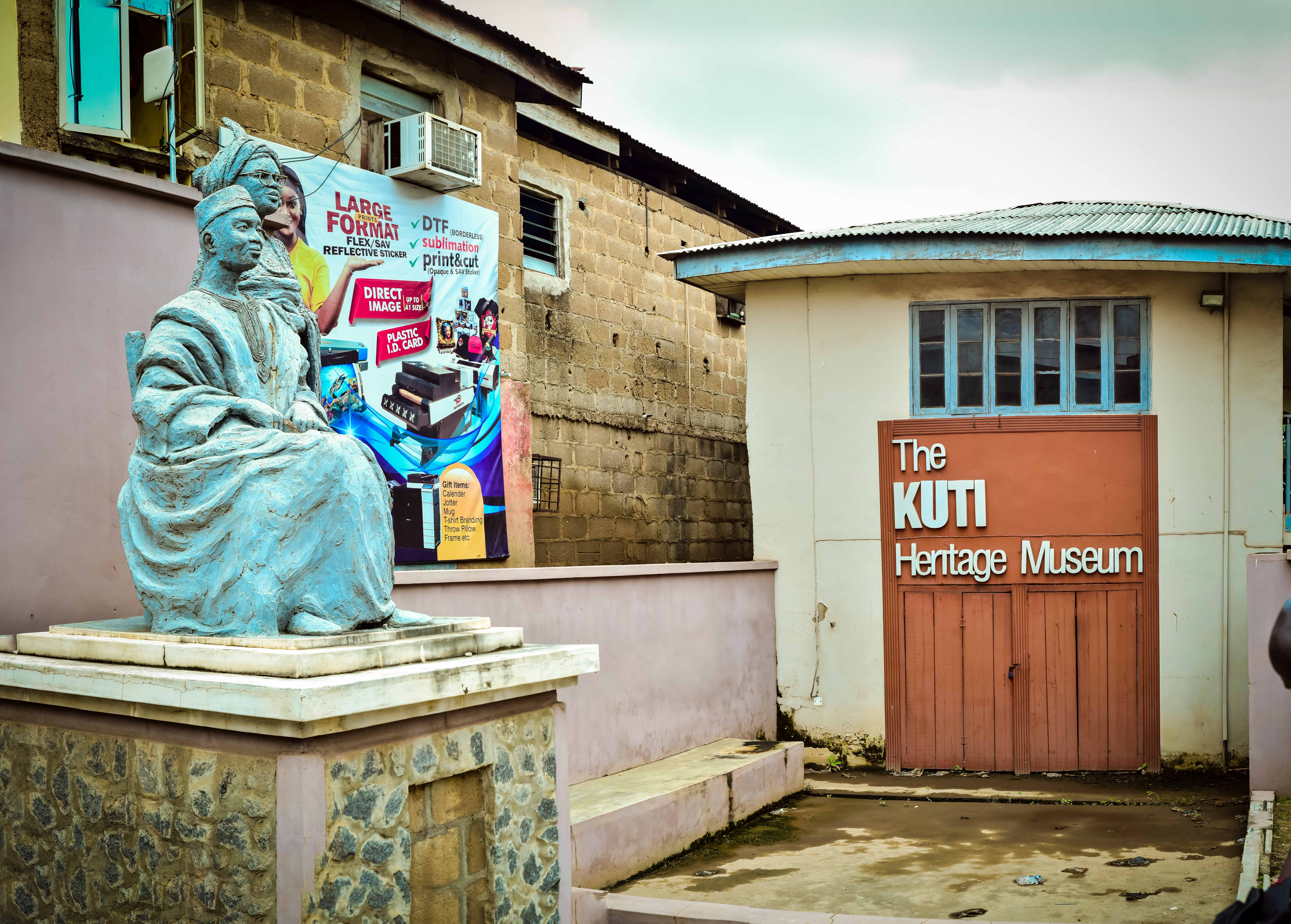

In 2017, in Abeokuta, the house on NEPA Road where the family of Israel and Funmilayo Ransome-Kuti lived was transformed into the Ransome-Kuti Museum, dedicated to the history of the family.

== Family tree ==
- Olasu (c. 1750–c. 1820)
  - Jamo (c.1785–c.1850) m. Orukoloku (c.1795–c.1870)
    - Likoye Kuti (c.1820–c.1863) m. Anne Ekidan Efupeyin (c. 1830–July 1877)
      - Eruwe Lousia Kuti (c.1857–19??)
      - Josiah Jesse Ransome-Kuti (1855–1930), clergyman and the first person to use the double-barrelled family name, m. Bertha Erinade Anny Olubi (1862–1934)
        - Josiah Oluyinka Ransome Kuti (1883–c.1960)
        - Anne Lape Iyabode Ransome-Kuti (1885–c.1960)
          - Grace Eniola Jenkins-Harrison (1908–1983) (Grace Eniola Soyinka) m. Samuel Ayodele Soyinka (1906–1976)
            - Akinwande Oluwole Babatunde Soyinka (1934) (Wole Soyinka), writer, Nobel laureate, among others
          - Samuel Olusanya Ransome-Kuti (1918–1992), journalist
        - Olufela Daniel Ransome-Kuti (1887–1887)
        - Israel Oludotun Ransome-Kuti (1891–1955), clergyman, m. Frances Abigail Olufunmilayo Thomas (1900–1978) (Funmilayo Ransome-Kuti), political activist
          - Dolupo Ransome-Kuti (1922–2010)
            - Frances Kuboye (d. 1997), dentist/jazz singer, m. Tunde Kuboye (Engineer/musician)
          - Olikoye Ransome-Kuti (1927–2003), doctor
          - Olufela Olusegun Oludotun Ransome-Kuti (1938–1997) (Fela Kuti), musician, m. Remilekun Taylor, among others
            - Omoyeni Anikulapo Kuti, (b. 1961) (Yeni Kuti), dancer, m. Femi Segun
              - Rolari Segun (b. 1988)
            - Olufela Olufemi Anikulapo Kuti, (b. 1962) (Femi Kuti), musician, m. Funke Kuti, dancer/music manager (now divorced)
              - Omorinmade Anikulapo Kuti, (b. 1995) (Made Kuti), musician
            - Sola Anikulapo Kuti, (1963–1997), dancer
            - Kunle Anikulapo Kuti, (b. circa 1971), folk singer, m. Olufunmilayo Hastrup (b. 1964)
            - Omosalewa Anikulapo Kuti, lawyer, m. Fehintola (1958–2006)
            - Oluseun Anikulapo Kuti, (b. 1982) (Seun Kuti), musician
            - Motunrayo Anikulapo Kuti, (b. 1980), dancer
          - Bekolari Ransome-Kuti (1940–2006), (Beko Ransome-Kuti), doctor and political activist
            - Enitan Ransome-Kuti, Nigerian Army officer
        - Joshua Oluremi Ransome-Kuti (1894–c. 1970)
        - Susannah Olubade (1898–1898)
        - Victoria Susannah Tinuade Ransome-Kuti (1899–1980)
        - Azariah Olusegun Orisale Ransome-Kuti (1902–1979)
          - Yemisi Ransome-Kuti (1947), current chief of the family
            - Olusegun Bucknor
            - Bola Soyemi
            - Oluwaseun Olasupo Soyemi
            - Eniola Anuoluwapo Mofoluwaso Soyemi

== See also ==
- Cripps–Appiah–Edun family
- Vaughan family
