= Yemisi Ransome-Kuti =

Nigerian activist

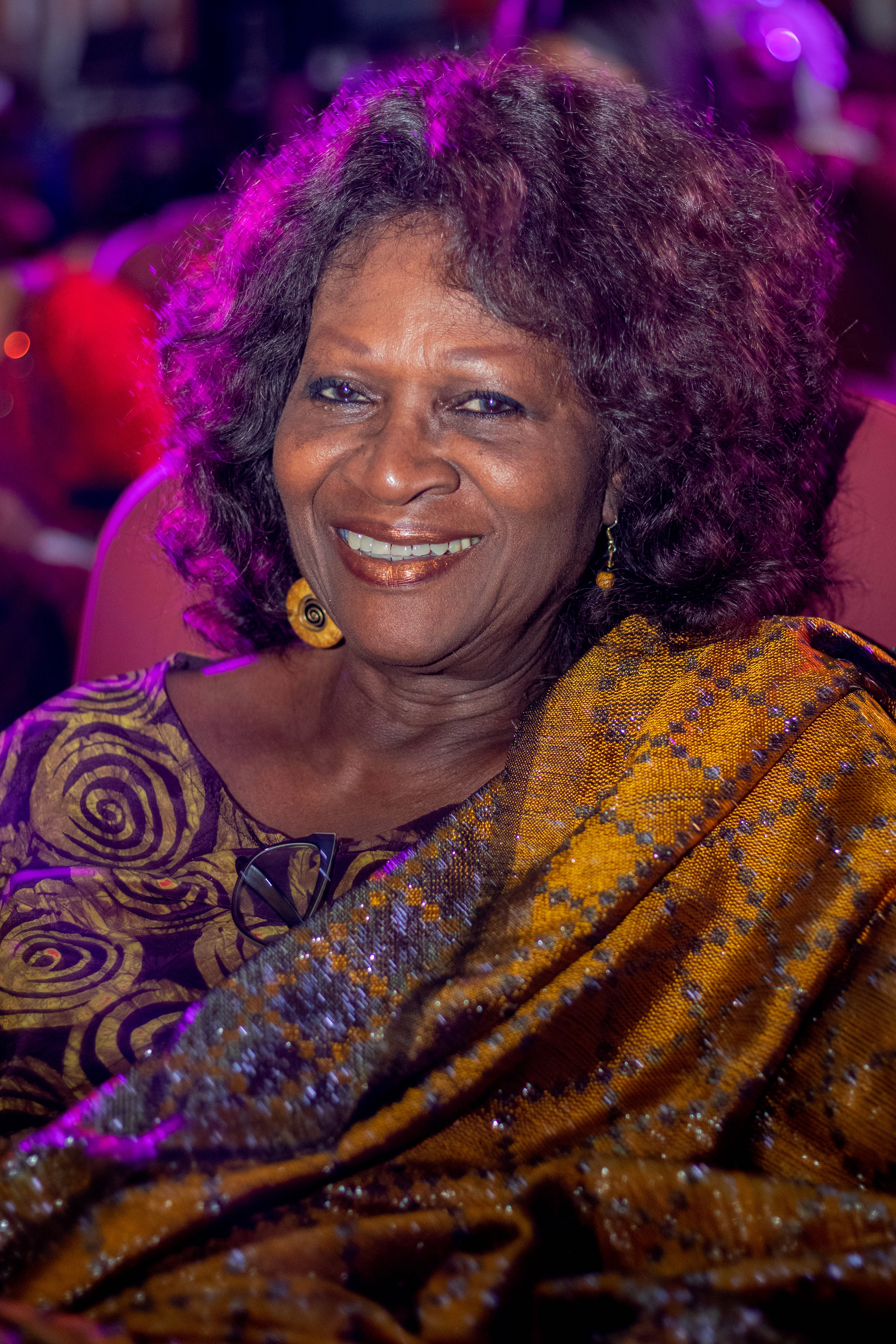
- Yemisi Ransome-Kuti portrait
- Born: Nigeria
- Citizenship: Nigerian
- Occupations: Educator, Activist
- Known for: Contributions to education and social development

Yemisi Ransome-Kuti is the only child of Azariah Olusegun Ransome-Kuti. She is also the granddaughter of Josiah Ransome-Kuti. Her aunt Chief Funmilayo Ransome-Kuti was a foremost feminist in Nigeria who was also part of the delegation that went to negotiate the terms of independence for their country from the British.

Ransome-Kuti is the cousin of Fela Kuti, Olikoye Kuti, Beko Ransome-Kuti and Africa's first Nobel Prize for Literature-winner Wole Soyinka, whose mother was a Ransome-Kuti. She has four children: Segun Bucknor by her first husband, the late Naval Captain Frederick Oluwole Bucknor, and three by her second husband, Dr Kunle Soyemi — Bola Soyemi, Seun Soyemi and Eniola Soyemi. With Fela Kuti, Beko Kuti and Koye Kuti all dead, Yemisi is the current head of the Ransome-Kuti family.

She recently retired as chairperson of the organization she founded, The Nigerian Network of Non-Governmental Organizations (NNNGO). The first organization of its kind in Nigeria to bring together civil society organizations, it has worked since its formation in 1992 to effect a harmonized agenda for third-sector development and its influence in the national framework.

In the early 1990s, she established "Girl Watch"; an organization aimed at educating young Nigerian girls from poor backgrounds. In 2006, she was appointed a Civil Society advisor to the World Bank. Yemisi Ransome-Kuti was one of those leading the charge in working for Nigeria to meet its Millennium Development Goals and eradicate poverty.

== Recognition ==
On May 28, 2022, Ransome-Kuti was nominated for the WIV impact award.
