= Bunmi Olusona =

Nigerian politician

- Born: 2 June 1965 (age 61); Kwara State, Nigeria
- Citizenship: Nigerian
- Education: University of Ibadan
- Occupations: Politician, Human rights activist, Clergy
- Years active: 1982–present

Festus Bunmi Olusona (born 2 June 1965) is a Nigerian human rights activist and politician.

== Education ==
Olusona graduated with a Bachelor of Arts in Philosophy with Honours from the University of Ibadan, Nigeria in 1992.

== Campus politics ==
Reverend Bunmi Olusona also known as 'Beyond Jordan' amongst fellow activists was a fierce Students' Union activist. He started student activism from the Kwara State College of Technology 1984/85 now renamed the Kwara State Polytechnic. He became the vice president of the Reformers Academy: an organisation formed by Professor Osam Edim Osam of the University of Ibadan, UI.

He contested and became the president of the University of Ibadan Students Union in 1989/90 under Professor Ayo Banjo, the then vice chancellor. By 1991/92 Bunmi Olusona became Zonal D chairman of the National Association of Nigerian Students (NANS) comprising all the tertiary institutions of south western part of Nigeria. After a popular nationwide anti-SAP riots of 1989, Bunmi Olusona and a few other students' leaders of the NANS were unlawfully arrested, detained and lumped with hardened criminals at the over-crowded Nigeria Ikoyi Prisons and Kirikiri maximum prison under decree no 2 of 1984. This notorious decree was enacted by the former Nigerian military dictator, General Ibrahim Badamosi Babangida. At the end of the uprising, over two hundred Nigerians were estimated to have been killed by the police, a huge number wounded and some student activists detained.

Bunmi Olusona was unlawfully arrested and detained alongside other students' activists namely: Christian Akanni, Kayode Olatunji, Late Barrister Bamidele Aturu, Barrister Opeyemi Bamidele, Barrister Abdul Aminu Mahmud, Emmanuel Nwanzu and Nasir Kura. He and some of these activists were four months both at the SSS detention facility at Ikoyi, they were later moved into Ikoyi and Kirikiri maximum prisons under the Detention of Persons Decree No. 2 of 1984 as amended. It was detention without trial. He was released along with other (NANS) leaders after a legal battle sponsored by the Barrister Alao Aka Bashorun led Nigerian Bar Association (NBA) and Barrister Olisa Agbakoba led Civil Liberties Organisation (CLO). Bunmi Olusona lost an academic session due to his incarceration at the Ikoyi prisons.

Bunmi Olusona and other detained students' activists were all declared prisoners of conscience by the Amnesty International in 1991/92.

Bunmi Olusona was much loved by students of the University of Ibadan (UI) due to achievements he recorded while he was President of the Students Union. All achieved due to popular struggles. Amongst them was:

- Bringing 'Water Treatment Plant' at the cost of 30m in 1990 after confrontation and negotiation with the Babangida military regime. This was what resolved years of agonizing water crisis of the University. It also impacted on the water consumption needs of the entire inhabitants of the University environments including Agbowo community.
- Forcing the University authority to rename erstwhile 'Students Village Hall' after Chief Obafemi Awolowo through students agitation against the wish of the University authorities.
- Forcing the FG to rebuild burnt section of Queen Elizabeth Hall, extend and complete Idia and Obafemi Awolowo halls.
- Consistently fought for the protection of the rights and privileges of students.
- Launched and raised funds for indigent students of the University of Ibadan.
- Launched students' agricultural scheme where the Students' Union owned a farm at Ajibode, a neighboring Community.
- He was a leading (NANS) activist and participated in many local and national students protests. He was constantly a thorn in the flesh of the Babangida administration even after he graduated from the University.
- Campaign Officer for the Campaign for Democracy, (CD), he was a leading mobilizer against the infamous annulment of the June 12, 1993 presidential election won by late Chief MKO Abiola.

Reverend Bunmi Olusona, who holds a bachelor's degree in Philosophy is married to Elizabeth Aderonke Olusona.

== Human rights activism ==
He was briefly at the Civil Liberties Organisation as Field Research Officer for Women Rights Project As a field research officer. At the CLO, he also did a research on the sufferings of the Nigerian Railway workers who were owed several months salaries. The title of the booklet is Dying in Agony.

- Acting Head of Campaigns, Campaign for Democracy, (CD)
- Co founded Oodua Youth Movement, a Yoruba self-determination platform.
- Co founded Covenant Group, a Yoruba self-determination Organisation.
- Co founded Oodua Peoples Congress with Dr Frederick Fasehun.
- Was a National Administrative Secretary of Movement for Socio and Economic Justice, (MOSEJ)

== Exile ==
Rev. Bunmi Olusona went on exile to Europe during the notorious Military regime of General Sani Abacha, As a 'Campaign Officer' with the Campaign for Democracy, (CD) and an active member of the Committee for the Defense of Human Rights, CDHR, he participated in many protests against the Military dictatorship of late General Sani Abacha. He fled Nigeria in 1996 after he granted a radio interview critical of the regime to CNN over the gruesome assassination of late Kudirat Abiola, wife of the late popular Nigerian millionaire politician, Chief MKO Abiola.

Bunmi Olusona has a close association on the field of activism with Nigerian human rights activists, some of which being Barrister Femi Falana SAN, Late Beko Ransome Kuti, Chief Frederick Fasehun, Late Baba Omojola, Late Alao Aka Bashorun, Late Gani Fawehinmi, Barrister Osagie Obayuwana, Comrade Gbenga Awosode, Comrade Wale Adebisi, Comrade Abiodun Aremu, Comrade Wale Adeniran, Comrade Odion Akhaine, Comrade Jiti Ogunye, Comrade Opeyemi Bamidele, now the Senate Majority Leader representing Ekiti Central. Comrade Popoola Ajayi, Gbenga Toyosi Olawepo, Comrade Rotimi Obadofin, Comrade Joe Okey Odumakin, Comrade Abdul Aminu Mahmud, Comrade Wale Okuniyi, ect.

== Partisan politics ==
On his return to Nigeria, he went into party politics by joining the Alliance for Democracy (AD) and became the party's Kwara State Governorship candidate in 2007. He lost the Election to the incumbent Governor of the State, Senator Bukola Saraki who was the former Nigerian Senate President.

By 2011, he contested for the Irepodun/Oke-Ero/Ekiti/Isin federal constituency seat at the Nigerian National Assembly on the political platform of the Action Congress of Nigeria (ACN) he lost the election in controversial circumstances. The election was believed to have been rigged against him.

Reverend Bunmi Olusona was a close political associate of Barrister Mohammed Dele Belgore, a Senior Advocate of Nigeria who was the 2011 Gubernatorial Candidate of the Action Congress of Nigeria, (ACN) in Kwara State.

Bunmi Olusona became a member of the Kwara State Caretaker Committee of the Action Congress of Nigeria (ACN) and All Progressives Congress (APC) between 2013/2014. He later became the Interim Kwara State Chairman of the All Progressives Congress, (APC), a position the national leadership of the party later ceded to Alhaji Ishola Fulani.

Between 2014/2015, Rev. Bunmi Olusona was the State Director General of Mohammed Dele Belgore's Governorship campaign organization popularly called Orange Revolution

He is still actively involved in party politics as a strong member of the Nigerian ruling party, the All Progressives Congress, (APC).

Rev. Bunmi Olusona was the Special Adviser on 'Media and Illicit Financial Flows' to the chairman House Committee on Financial Crimes, Hon. Kayode Oladele who is currently the acting chairman, Federal Character Commission FCC.

Rev. Bunmi Olusona was a member of the Kwara Transition Committee which ushered in the administration of the Executive Governor of Kwara State, Malam AbdulRahman Abdulrazak.

Rev. Bunmi Olusona is currently a director on the board of the North Central Development Commission NCDC.

== Relevant publications ==
Partisan politics

Senator Michael Opeyemi Bamidele

https://nass.gov.ng/mps/single/158https://nass.gov.ng/mps/single/158

Hon. Kayode Oladele

https://www.efcc.gov.ng/efcc/news-and-information/news-release/2961-work-at-efcc-new-head-office-impressive-repshttps://www.efcc.gov.ng/efcc/news-and-information/news-release/2961-work-at-efcc-new-head-office-impressive-reps

Hon. Kayode Oladele FCC

https://federalcharacter.gov.ng/

https://federalcharacter.gov.ng/Federal Character Commission

https://federalcharacter.gov.ng/

https://www.vanguardngr.com/2019/07/ise-ya-political-group-debuts/amp/Rev. Bunmi Olusona

https://www.vanguardngr.com/2019/07/ise-ya-political-group-debuts/amp/Kwara Transition Committee

https://www.vanguardngr.com/2019/07/ise-ya-political-group-debuts/amp/

https://kwarastate.gov.ng/press_releases/gov-abdulrazaq-congratulates-newly-appointed-nddcs-ed-top-official-from-kwara/Rev. Rev. https://kwarastate.gov.ng/press_releases/gov-abdulrazaq-congratulates-newly-appointed-nddcs-ed-top-official-from-kwara/Rev. Bunmi Olusona NCDC

https://kwarastate.gov.ng/press_releases/gov-abdulrazaq-congratulates-newly-appointed-nddcs-ed-top-official-from-kwara/

https://www.ilorin.info/fullnews.php?id=25089

https://www.ncdc-gov.com/North Central Development Commission

https://www.ncdc-gov.com/

- Nigeria, on the Eve of "change": Transition to What? - Page 33
- 1991 - Full view Five others were held at Ikoyi Prison: Nasir Kura, NANS vice president for national affairs Okereke, NANS secretary general; Olatunji Kayode, clerk of NANS senate; Bunmi Olusona, student at University of Ibadan; and Christian Akanni, student ... Liberty: A Quarterly News Letter of Civil Liberties Organisation
- 1990 - Snippet view - More editions detention, the students had gone on a ten-day hunger strike, causing the collapse of Bunmi Olusona, Nasir Kura and Christian Akanni. All three were suffering from diarrhoea and had been vomiting blood five days prior to their collapse. In the saddle: a vice-chancellor's story - Page 119
- L. Ayo Banjo - 1997 - Snippet view - More editions ... of Mr Bunmi Olusona, (alias Beyond Jordan) former president, University of Ibadan Students Union 1989/90 session. [Olusona had reportedly disappeared from the campus and was suspected to have been abducted by security agents. Democracy in Action: The South-West Experience - Page 91]
- Dapo Olasebikan - 2002 - Snippet view - More editions Akangbe, Wale Balogun, Wale Olabisi (Don), Abiodnn /« remu, Femi Obayori, Bayo Ojo, Funso Mojuba, Ebun Adegoruwa, Segun Sango, Fred Adegoke, Ayodele Akele, Kayode Ogundamisi, Bunmi Olusona, Sola Otitolaye, Taiwo Otitolaye ... The African Guardian - Page 28
- 1991 - Snippet view - More editions Other students challenging their incarceration are Bunmi Olusona, NANS zonal co-ordinator and final year Philosophy student of the University of lbadan. Christian Aka, a graduate student in Port Harcourt and Olatunji Kay ode, a final year ... The News - Volume 28 - Page 27
- 2007 - Snippet view - More editions They are the incumbent governor, Dr. Bukola Saraki (PDP), Hon. Gbenga Olawepo (DPP), Senator Suleiman Makanjuola Ajadi (AC). Others are Chief Theophilus Bamigboye (AP), Alhaji Khaleel Bolaji (ANPP) and Revd. Bunmi Olusona (AD). Annual Report, Human Rights Situation in Nigeria - Page 18
- 1991 - Snippet view - More editions - The affected student leaders include: Mahmud Abdul-Aminu (NANS President), Chima Okereke (NANS Secretary-General), Nasser Kura (NANS Vice-President), Bunmi Olusona (former President University of Iba^in Students Union), Bamidele ... Errands for progress - Page 12
- Opeyemi Bamidele - 2003 - Snippet view ... Biodun Ogunade, Femi Obayori, Biodun Aremu, Rotimi Obadofin, Debo Adeniran, Olumide Akanmu, Bunmi Olusona, Kayode Olatunji, Christian Akani, Olumide Adeyinka, Kayode Oladele, Kayode Opeifa, Anthony Olusanya, Toyin Adeniran, ... Annual Report on Human Rights in Nigeria - Page 77
- 1991 - Snippet view - More editions The said meeting was attended on the side of the Students by Bamidele Opeyemi, a former NANS President; Sylvester Odion, Public Relations Officer; Chima Okereke, Secretary-General; Bunmi Olusona, then President University of Ibadan ... Patterns of Abuse of Women's Rights in Employment and Police ...
- Theresa Akumadu - 1995 - Snippet view - They include Mrs. Ayo Obe and Mr. Dulue Mbachu for editing the Manuscript, Mr. Rotimi Johnson, Miss Anne Aimua and Mr. Bunmi Olusona for carrying out the field work. Our very special gratitude goes to the International Centre For Human ... New Breed - Volume 4, Issues 16-17 - Page 14
- 1991 - Snippet view - More editions - On the commitment of the students, Mr. Bunmi Olusona, the president of the University of Ibadan Students' Union says "the students' body will fight on behalf of the lecturers not because of the personalities involved, but based on the principles ... Newswatch - Volume 13, Issues 14-26 - Page 25
- 1991 - Snippet view - More editions - The, students who attended the meeting are Chukwuma Innocent, University of Nigeria, Nsukka; Bunmi Olusona, UI; Opeyemi Bamidele, Nigerian Law School, Lagos; Okereke Chima, University of Jos; Naseer Kura Ja'afaru, Bayero University, ...
