= Abdul Aminu Mahmud =

Nigerian former Students' Union leader, lawyer, human rights advocate, and poet

Abdul Mahmud
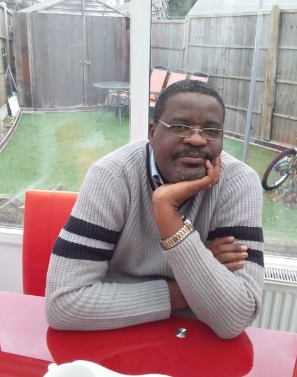
- Mahmud at his Farnham Royal, England home in 2018
- Born: November 20, 1968 (age 57); Bauchi, Northeastern Nigeria
- Citizenship: British Nigerian
- Education: Bachelor of Laws, LL.B University of Jos; Master of Laws, LL.M Nigeria Law School
- Occupation: Lawyer
- Years active: 1993 - present
- Organization(s): President, National Association of Nigerian Students (NANS)
- Known for: Social Commentator, Civil Rights Activist
- Board member of: International Centre For Investigative Reporting; Social Intervention Advocacy; Foundation Centre for Strengthening the Economic Position of the Ultra Poor; Electoral Reform Expert Group
- Children: 3

Abdul Mahmud is a Nigerian lawyer, social critic, columnist, human rights advocate, knowledge worker, essayist, poet, former Students' union leader and activist. He is currently the President, Public Interest Lawyers League (PILL), a body of professional and independent group of lawyers committed to the promotion and enforcement of the rights of vulnerable and minority groups, deepening of democracy and governance and the expansion of public interest law. He is a third-generation Nigerian poet whose works appear under the nom de guerre, Obemata. Some of his poems have also been translated into Polish, Lithuanian and French languages.

== Early life, education and activism ==
=== Education ===
Abdul 'Aminu' Mahmud was born in Bauchi, Northeastern Nigeria on 20 November 1968. He was educated at Federal School of Arts and Science, Ondo State and the University of Jos, Plateau State where he obtained his Bachelor of Laws, LL.B (Honours), then proceeded to the Nigeria Law School for his Master of Laws, LL.M.

=== Student activism and prison ===
Abdul Mahmud became the President of National Association of Nigerian Students aka NANS in November, 1990, and his leadership and activism led to his abduction and detention by the Department of State Security aka DSS alongside other high-ranking members of the association. Detained alongside him were Bamidele Aturu, Nasir Kura, Chima Okereke, Olatunji Kayode, Bunmi Olusona and Christian Akanni.

== Career ==
=== Legal practice ===
He is the Chief Counsel, Ephesis Lex, (Attorneys & Solicitors), Abuja and President of Public Interest Lawyers League (PILL). Prior to that, he was the Senior Legal Executive Tivoli Technology, Stoke Poges, England and served as a Director of Legal Services, Civil Liberties Organization, CLO, Nigeria. He is a Dutch Fellow on Development, Law & Social Justice of International Institute of Social Studies The Hague (class of 1998), and was a Visiting Lecturer in Human Rights Law, Olabisi Onabanjo University, Ogun State. He was a delegate of the 2014 National Conference of Nigeria representing the Civil Society Organizations.

=== Social commentator ===
Obemata, his nom de guerre is a regular contributor on legal and public affairs, national and international issues on major national and international print and electronic news media, including The Guardian (Nigeria) newspaper, Daily Times (Nigeria), Channels Television, Africa Independent Television, Radio Nigeria, African Writer Magazine and the Africa Service of the British Broadcasting Corporation and on several online blogs and social media platforms.

=== Anthologies ===
==== Poetry ====
- Self Portrait
- For WS, for Breytenbach
- In his footsteps
- My Heart Whispers, Prometheus
- Sunset
- Protest Streets
- Memoir

==== Fiction ====
- Chequepoint Charlie

==== Literary reviews ====
- Lola Shoneyin's Love of Flight
- The Legal Framework of Nigeria's Economic Diplomacy: A Review of Nigeria's Economic Diplomacy by Musa Babayo
- We Are All Biafrans - A Participant-Observer's Intervention in a Country Sleepwalking to Disaster by Chido Onumah

==== Selected essays and papers ====
- Audu's Death: Resolving the Legal Conundrum
- Electricity Tariff: What the NERC must do to inspire investors' confidence
- Falling Standards in Education and the Crisis of Higher Education in Nigeria
- Legal and Administrative Imperatives for the Operation of Political Parties in Nigeria, Abuja, 2013
- Making Sense of the Judgment of the Taraba State Election Petition Tribunal
- NANS in Our Eyes: The Journey through Time and Space, Kano, 2015
- On the Cyber Stalker Near You: The Power of Arrest of the EFCC Examined
- Politicians and the Courts are Shackling INEC
- The State Digs in Once More: Preliminary Observations on the Transport Sector of the Transformation Agenda, Abuja, 2012

==== Selected articles ====
- 12 Important Guides For Student Activists and Leaders
- A Nation of Basket Mouths
- Buhari, His Critics and The Case for Efficient Government
- Dear Dame, Don't Abuse Kongi
- EFCC ill-prepared to handle corruption cases/
- Government of Absurdities
- Kabiru Mohammed and the falsification of history
- Our Mutually Assured Destruction
- Why CJN must make assets declaration public

==== Books ====
- Triptych- A collection of poems
- Service Delivery Reports for Most Outstanding Public Institutions in Nigeria (Co-Authored);
- Human Rights in Retreat in Nigeria, Report of the Universal Defenders of Democracy, UDD, December, 1994 (Co-authored with Chief Mike Ozekhome, SAN)

== Political activities ==
- Delegate, 2014 Nigeria National Conference
- Former National Deputy Chairman of Campaign for Democracy(1991-1992)
- Former Secretary of Democratic Alternative(1994-1999)
- Member, Electoral Reform Expert Group

== Selected mentions ==
- Identity Transformation and Identity Politics Under Structural Adjustment in Nigeria
- Karen Sorensen in Nigeria on the eve of change: Transition to what?
- Civil Rights and Pro-Democracy Groups in and outside Nigeria
