= Hakeem Shitta =

Nigerian arts photographer and publisher

Hakeem Olatunbosun Shitta
- Born: 6 August 1955; Lagos, Nigeria
- Died: 5 June 1997 (aged 41); Lagos, Nigeria
- Occupations: Photographer, publisher, martial artist, cultural documentarist
- Years active: 1970s–1997
- Known for: Cultural photography and documentation

Hakeem Olatunbosun Shitta (6 August 1955 – 5 June 1997) was a Nigerian photographer, publisher, editor, and martial artist known for documenting Nigeria's arts and cultural life through portraits, backstage photography, and street-level images of artists, performers, writers, and public events in Lagos and beyond. He founded and edited arts and culture periodicals including Arts Illustrated Weekly and Arts Diary, and compiled the influential Handbook of Nigerian Artists (1993), a reference work on Nigerian artists and their careers. Shitta's photographic work—spanning thousands of images from the 1970s through the 1990s—forms a substantial archive of Nigeria's creative scene and has been discussed in later commentary on the country's visual history and cultural documentation, including posthumous coverage in The Guardian Nigeria.

== Early life and education ==
Shitta was born in Lagos, Nigeria, the son of Alhaji Lamidi Shitta and Alhaja Barakat Oladimeji (née Carew). He attended Ikeja Grammar School in Oshodi, where he developed an early interest in photography. According to a 1989 profile in The Guardian, Shitta's artistic development began with drawing during his primary school years.

Shitta later enrolled at Yaba College of Technology, but left before completing his studies, choosing instead to pursue independent documentation and fieldwork in Nigeria's arts sector. For much of his career, he operated from a two-bedroom apartment in the Amuwo-Odofin Housing Estate in Lagos, which served as both his home and the makeshift office for his photographic library and publishing efforts.

== Publishing career ==
Shitta was active as a cultural publisher and editor. He established the magazine Arts Illustrated Weekly, first published on Thursday, 4 May 1989, as a four-page weekly dedicated to chronicling events in Nigeria's arts and culture sector. In a 1989 Guardian profile, Shitta explained that he conceived Arts Illustrated Weekly as a means of increasing public awareness of the arts, citing the lack of space given to cultural reporting in mainstream newspapers. A 1991 profile in The Guardian (Nigeria), written by arts journalist Jahman Anikulapo, further examined his editorial vision, noting the publication's emphasis on documentation and efforts to remain independent within Nigeria's arts publishing landscape.

Shitta emphasized editorial independence, avoiding reliance on grants or conditional sponsorships, opting instead for advertisement income and contributor content. In December 1990, the National Museum of African Art Library at the Smithsonian Institution wrote to Shitta requesting back issues of Arts Illustrated Weekly, describing the publication as “quite informative and of particular interest” in its documentation of Nigerian art exhibitions. A subsequent letter dated 3 July 1991 from Smithsonian Institution Libraries acknowledged receipt of 32 issues of the magazine for its research collections.

The magazine's influence in cultural reporting was reflected in a 1990 special tribute edition published in honour of theatre legend Hubert Ogunde. Shitta later produced another Lagos-based periodical, Arts Diary, which also focused on Nigeria's visual and performing arts scene, and in 1993 he compiled the Handbook of Nigerian Artists, a reference work cataloguing the careers, exhibitions, and contributions of artists across the country.

== Martial arts ==
A black belt holder in Shotokan Karate, Shitta was a certified instructor.

== Photography and archive ==
By the mid-1980s, Shitta's photographs were regularly published and credited in major Nigerian newspapers, documenting theatre productions, television drama, and live music performances.

He also documented Nigerian theatre and television productions, including Mirror in the Sun and other major productions such as Village Headmaster, Checkmate, and Death and the King's Horseman.

At the time of his death, Shitta's archive comprised more than 6,000 cultural portraits documenting Nigeria's most accomplished poets, actors, musicians, and intellectuals. The Hakeem Shitta Photo and Cultural Archive (HSPACA), currently curated by Esther Oladimeji his niece, catalogues documentation of more than 180 theatre productions staged at the National Theatre and other venues, alongside concerts, exhibitions, festivals, regattas, and human‑interest events. The archive also includes visual records relating to the period surrounding Nigeria's 1993 presidential election.

The archive includes images of international artists such as Dizzy Gillespie, Miriam Makeba, and Yvonne Chaka Chaka, as well as literary giants like Wole Soyinka, Chinua Achebe, and Ken Saro-Wiwa.

== Collaborations ==
Through his work as a photographer and publisher, Shitta documented events and activities involving a range of cultural institutions and arts organizations in Nigeria. A 1991 profile in The Guardian Nigeria noted his close engagement with the country's organized arts sector through Arts Illustrated, which regularly covered institutional programmes, performances, exhibitions, and cultural initiatives across Lagos and other centres.

His photographic work included coverage of events associated with cultural bodies such as the Goethe-Institut Nigeria, the National Council for Arts and Culture, and international cultural programmes active in Lagos during the period.

== Cultural documentation ==
Continuing his photographic practice, Shitta recorded funerals of prominent cultural figures, such as Hubert Ogunde and Orlando Martins. His work also included documentation of exhibitions and cultural displays in Lagos during the late 1980s, as reflected in contemporaneous coverage in national newspapers such as The Punch.

== Final years and death ==
By the mid-1990s, Shitta’s career was increasingly affected by ill health. The Glendora Review noted that he underwent surgery for a growth on his cranium, which stalled his publishing efforts. Later retrospective accounts described his illness as beginning after a head injury and developing into a serious condition that required repeated surgical interventions.

Despite undergoing multiple surgeries, members of Nigeria’s arts community organized fundraising efforts to support his treatment, including travel abroad for specialized medical care. Anikulapo described this period as a struggle against a recurring tumour that required multiple surgeries, detailing how Shitta continued to attempt to work despite the physical toll. In a 2024 interview, actress Princess Golda John Abiola also recalled seeing him visibly unwell during this period, with what she described as a swelling at the back of his head.

Shitta died in Lagos on 5 June 1997. His death coincided with a period of major losses in Nigeria’s cultural community, including Fela Kuti and singer Fran Kuboye, and was noted in contemporaneous tributes as underscoring the vulnerability of Nigeria’s creative class.

== Legacy ==
Because much of Shitta's work survived him through published photographs and preserved archives, it has continued to be reassessed within Nigeria’s cultural discourse. Commentators have described his photographs as a form of ethnographic documentation, providing a visual record of Nigeria's cultural life during a transformative period in the country's artistic history.

His work was featured posthumously at the iREP International Documentary Film Festival in 2017, including a panel discussion titled The Other Archive, which examined the role of personal archives in documenting African cultural memory. In later commentary, his photographic practice has been referenced in discussions of Nigerian documentary traditions and visual historiography.

After his death, the Diamond Awards for Media Excellence (DAME) introduced a prize for News Photography (often styled as Action Photography) in his honor. His images have appeared in Prime People, The Guardian Nigeria, Punch, Vanguard, and international publications such as Afrika und Bild (1993).

Tributes and retrospective commentary from artists and filmmakers have emphasized his influence within Nigeria’s visual culture. In 2007, Jahman Anikulapo described him as “one of the quiet giants of our visual memory.” A 2020 retrospective in THISDAY referred to him as a “fallen general of the Nigerian artsphere” whose absence continued to be felt within the cultural community. In December 2025, the Hakeem Shitta Photo and Cultural Archive (HSPACA) was highlighted as a “functional necessity” for modern African cinema and documentary research, serving as a resource for scholars and filmmakers seeking historical visual documentation.
