= Cheryl Johnson-Odim =

American historian

Cheryl Johnson-Odim is an American historian. She taught at the University of Wisconsin-Madison, Northwestern University and Loyola University Chicago. She became dean at Columbia College Chicago and in 2007 was made provost of Dominican University in River Forest, Illinois.

== Early life ==
Cheryl Johnson-Odim was born April 30, 1948, in Youngstown, Ohio. Her parents were Robert Dawson and Elayne Jeffries, and they raised her Catholic. After the family moved to New York City, she attended P.S. 136 and Springfield Gardens Junior High School, before graduating from Andrew Jackson High School in Queen. She then studied at the City College of New York for two years before transferring to Youngstown State University,where she earned a B.A. cum laude in history in 1972. She completed her PhD at Northwestern University in 1978. . She pursued African history as her area of specialization when she began her doctoral studies at Northwestern University. In 1975, she conducted research in Nigeria as a Fulbright Scholar in support of her doctoral dissertation. Her early exposure to global and African-related issues contributed to her later academic focus. She had first heard about apartheid in South Africa in 1963, when she sang as part of a children's chorus on The Streets I've Walked by Harry Belafonte, released by RCA, and also appeared with the group on the Bell Telephone Hour and later also met South African dancers that Belafonte had brought to the USA.

== Career ==
Between 1980 and 1986, Johnson-Odim was at Northwestern University as a lecturer in the history department and Assistant Director of the program of African Studies. Latter, taught at the University of Wisconsin-Madison. She moved to Loyola University Chicago the following year and chaired the department of history from 1995 until 2000. She was the first woman and the first African-American person to do so. She then held the post of dean at Columbia College Chicago and in 2007, she was made provost of Dominican University in River Forest, Illinois. Having left that role, she is now professor emerita of history at Dominican. Her research focus was African American and West African history.

In 1995, she edited the volume Expanding the Boundaries of Women's History: Essays on Women in the Third World together with Margaret Strobel. This book examined various histories of women in the nineteenth and twentieth centuries. Two years later, she published For Women and the Nation: Funmilayo Ransome-Kuti of Nigeria with Nina Emma Mba. The book gives a full account of Ransome-Kuti's life.

As a community activist in the Chicago area, Johnson-Odim campaigned against apartheid and her materials are now held as a special collection at Columbia College; she addressed the United Nations Special Committee against Apartheid. She participated in the Free South Africa Movement, TransAfrica and the Coalition for Illinois Divestment from South Africa. She was on the Chicago organizing committee for the 2017 Women's March.

She served as chair of the Higher Learning Commission; vice chair of the Illinois Humanities Council; co-chair of the Block Museum of Art at Northwestern; and on the boards of several organizations, including the American Council of Learned Societies and the African Studies Association.

== Personal life ==
Johnson-Odim has been married three times and has three children: attorney Chaka Patterson, artist Rashid Johnson, and Maya Odim, a poet and educator.

== Selected works ==
- Johnson-Odim, Cheryl (1997). For women and the nation: Funmilayo Ransome-Kuti of Nigeria. Urbana: University of Illinois Press. ISBN 978-0252066139.
- Johnson-Odim, Cheryl (1992). Expanding the boundaries of women's history : essays on women in the Third World. Bloomington: Indiana University Press. ISBN 9780253330970.
- Johnson-Odim, Cheryl (2007). Women and Gender in the History of Sub-Saharan Africa. American Historical Association, ISBN 978-0-87229-152-2

Additionally, she has published 30 articles in scholarly journals and book chapters.
