= Fran Kuboye =

- Born: Frances Opeolu Folorunsho; 22 November 1949; Halifax, England
- Died: 21 August 1997 (aged 47) Lagos, Nigeria
- Genres: Afrobeat; Afro jazz
- Occupations: Musician; Singer; Activist
- Instruments: Saxophone; piano
- Years active: 1978–1997

Fran Kuboye (born Frances Opeolu Folorunsho, November 22, 1949 – 21 August 1997) was a British-Nigerian singer, dentist, TV personality and women's rights activist who co-founded the Jazz 38 club in Lagos and the Extended Family Jazz Band. Born into the Ransome-Kuti family, she was the granddaughter of Funmilayo Ransome-Kuti, and niece of Fela Kuti.

== Early life ==
Kuboye was born in Halifax, England to Dolupo Ransome Kuti, and named after her grandmother Frances Funmilayo Ransome Kuti. Kuboye had her primary education at Clifton Church of England School, Carnforth and Lancashire Church of England School, and her secondary education at Lancaster Girls Grammar School, England, later transferring to Skipton Girls High School. She acquired a degree as a dental surgeon in 1974 from Sheffield University.

== Career ==
Kuboye relocated to Nigeria in 1977. She got into music a year later and co-founded the Jazz 38 club with the Extended Family Jazz Band led by herself and her husband Tunde Kuboye. The venue later became the most popular jazz hub in Nigeria where both her uncle and cousin - Fela Kuti and his son Femi - occasionally performed as guest artistes. The Extended Family band members were reputed to be the pioneers of Jazz music in Nigeria and they were the first in the country to release an album on compact disc titled Jisting.

Kuboye - also a TV presenter - hosted the arts segment of The Sunday Show with Livi Ajuonuma. She also acted as a talent judge on several musical contest shows including NTA Network's Who's On? alongside her husband Tunde. She started a non-profit organization with Yemisi Ransome-Kuti called "Girl Watch" to empower less privileged secondary school students on gender equality and social abnormalities in the African culture. Kuboye who was also a painter who used arts and crafts to educate young female students about the dangers of female genital mutilation and the importance of using education to achieve gender equality.

== Personal life ==
Kuboye was married to Tunde Kuboye, an engineer-turned-musician, and they had three children together including their only son, musician Baba Kuboye.

== Death ==
On 21 August 1997, less than a month after her uncle Fela Kuti's death, Kuboye died after a brief illness. This was one of three deaths in the Kuti family that year; Fela's daughter and Kuboye's cousin, Sola, would also pass away shortly after.
