= Enitan Ransome-Kuti =

Nigerian army general (born 1964)

- Born: 1964 (age 61–62); Lagos, Nigeria
- Education: Nigerian Defence Academy; Nigerian Military School
- Relatives: Ransome-Kuti family
- Military career
- Allegiance: Nigeria
- Branch: Nigerian Army
- Rank: Brigadier general
- Commands: Multinational Joint Task Force
- Conflicts: Commander of the United Nations Peacekeeping Mission in Liberia

Enitan Ransome-Kuti (born 1964) is a retired Nigerian Army one-star general and son of the late human rights activist Beko Ransome-Kuti. In 2015, he served as Commander of the Multinational Joint Task Force.

== Early life and education ==
Enitan Ransome-Kuti was born in Lagos, Nigeria. He is an alumnus of the Nigerian Military School, Zaria and the Nigerian Defence Academy, where he had his formal education before receiving his commission into the Nigerian Army.

== Career ==
After rising through the ranks of the army to a brigadier general, Ransome-Kuti was appointed Commander of the Multinational Joint Task Force. On 15 October 2015, he was dismissed from the Nigerian Army by a court martial and sentenced to six months' imprisonment after being found guilty of "cowardice" and "mutiny" following the Baga attacks by the Boko Haram sect in 2015. However, his sentence and dismissal were commuted on 3 March 2016 and he was demoted to the rank of colonel.

== Awards ==
- Meritorious Service Star
- Forces Service Star
- Passed Staff Course
- Fellow of the National Defence College
- Master of Science degree
