= Olikoye Ransome-Kuti =

Nigerian paediatrician, medical professor, and health minister

- Born: 30 December 1927
- Died: 1 June 2003 (aged 75)
- Education: Ransome-Kuti attended Abeokuta Grammar School, University of Ibadan and Trinity College Dublin (1948–54).
- Alma mater: University of Ibadan
- Occupations: Nigerian paediatrician, professor of medicine, and Health Minister of Nigeria.
- Children: 3
- Awards: Leon Bernard Foundation Prize; Maurice Pate Award

Olikoye Ransome-Kuti (30 December 1927 – 1 June 2003) was a physician specialising in paediatrics, a long-time professor of medicine and public health, and a former Health Minister of Nigeria.

== Early life and education ==
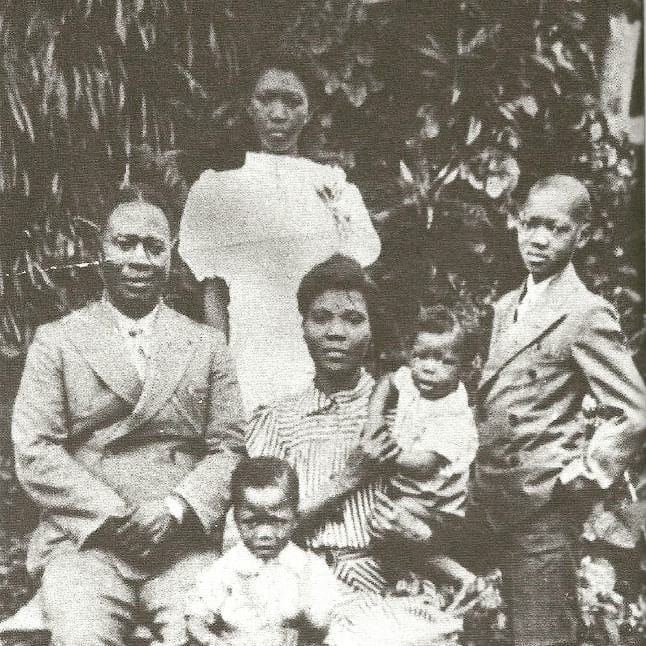
Reverend Israel and Chief Funmilayo beside him; Dolu is behind and Fela in foreground; baby in arms is Beko; Olikoye is to the right.

Olikoye Ransome-Kuti was born in Ijebu Ode on 30 December 1927, in present-day Ogun State, Nigeria. His mother, Chief Funmilayo Ransome-Kuti, was a prominent political campaigner and women's rights activist; his father, Reverend Israel Oludotun Ransome-Kuti, was a Protestant minister and school principal, as well as the first president of the Nigeria Union of Teachers. His brother, Fela Kuti, would grow up to be a popular musician and a founder of Afrobeat (he would die of AIDS-related complications in 1997); another brother, Beko Ransome-Kuti, would become a physician and, eventually, an internationally known political activist.

Olikoye Ransome-Kuti attended Abeokuta Grammar School. He then attended the University of Ibadan in Nigeria for his undergraduate studies, after which he matriculated at Trinity College Dublin in Ireland for his medical degree (in 1948–54).

Olikoye returned to Nigeria for a handful of years to practice general medicine following the completion of his medical degree, then, in 1960, he travelled back to the U.K. to begin his postgraduate training in paediatrics, attending Hammersmith Hospital's postgraduate medical school between 1960 and 1962.

Following completion of his postgraduate training in paediatrics, he once again returned to Nigeria.

== Career ==
Olikoye Ransome-Kuti was a house physician at General Hospital, Lagos. He was senior lecturer at the University of Lagos from 1967 to 1970. He was appointed Director of child health at the College of Medicine, University of Lagos and became Head of Department of Paediatrics from 1968 to 1976. He was professor of paediatrics at the College of Medicine, University of Lagos until his retirement in 1988. He worked as senior house officer at Great Ormond Street Hospital, London, and as a locum in Hammersmith Hospital in the 1960s.

In 1983, along with two other Nigerians, he founded one of Nigeria's largest health-focused non-governmental organizations, the Society for Family Health Nigeria, which was primarily concerned with family planning and child health services at the time.

In 1985, he joined the government of General Ibrahim Babangida as the Health Minister of Nigeria, and in 1986 conveyed word of Nigeria's first AIDS case – a 14-year-old girl who had been diagnosed with HIV. Olikoye remained Health Minister of Nigeria until 1992, when he left the position to join the World Health Organization as its Deputy Director-General.

In the course of his career, Olikoye ikoye held various teaching positions, including a visiting professorship at Baltimore's Johns Hopkins University's school of hygiene and public health. During his career, he also wrote for, and published in, medical journals and publications.

He won the Leon Bernard Foundation Prize in 1986. He was presented in 1990 with the Maurice Pate Award.

At the time of his death in June 2003, Olikoye Ransome-Kuti had been tentatively assigned the post of health minister in President Olusegun Obasanjo's (1999-2007) cabinet.

== Personal life and death ==
Olikoye Ransome-Kuti was married to Doherty Adefare Sonia for 50 years; they produced three children.

Olikoye died on 1 June 2003, suddenly, at the age of 75, of a pulmonary embolism, in a hotel room in London, while in England to attend a World Health Organization meeting. At the time of his death he was chairman of the Primary Health Care Development Agency in Nigeria.
