= Mike Ozekhome =

Nigerian constitutional lawyer

SAN Chief Mike Agbedor Abu Ozekhome
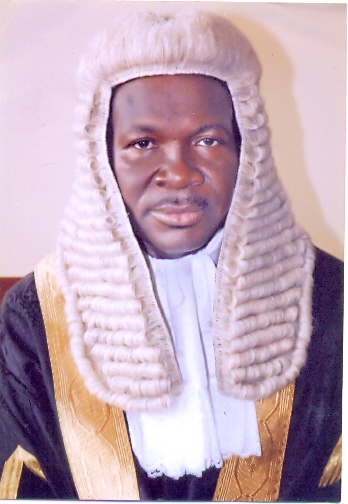
- Born: 15 October 1957 (age 68); Iviukwe, Agenebode, Edo State, Nigeria
- Education: Obafemi Awolowo University
- Occupations: Lawyer and human rights activist

Mike Agbedor Abu Ozekhome (born on 15 October 1957 in Iviukwe, Agenebode in Edo State, Nigeria) is a lawyer and human rights activist, holding the rank of a Senior Advocate of Nigeria. He is known for his work as a constitutional lawyer and also an orator.

== Education ==
Ozekhome was born on 15 October 1957 in Iviukwe, Agenebode, Edo State, Nigeria. He began his education at St. Mary's Catholic Primary School (now Athekhai Primary School), Iviukwe, where he excelled academically. He continued at St. Peter's College, Agenebode, and later attended Baptist Academy, Lagos. He studied law at the University of Ife (now Obafemi Awolowo University), Ile-Ife, earning a Bachelor of Laws (LL.B.) in 1980, during which he received several academic prizes. He proceeded to the Nigerian Law School, Lagos, and was called to the bar in July 1981. In 1983, he obtained a Master of Laws (LL.M.) degree from Obafemi Awolowo University, further solidifying his legal expertise. Ozekhome has since received 14 honorary doctorate degrees, including a Ph.D., JD, LL.D., D.Litt., D.Sc., D.Ed., D.Arts, DLE and Hon.DL from various institutions worldwide. He received his Hon.DL (Doctor of Letters, Honoris Causa), as well as several awards ("One of the Great Minds of the 21st Century", "One of the 100 Outstanding Personalities of the 20th Century", "International Man of the Year", etc.) from the International Biographical Center (IBC). This institution is notorious for creating awards and certificates and selling them for US$495 around the year 2004. He was also featured in several of the publication's "Who is Who" scam reference works such as "Who is Who in Edo State", "Who is Who in Etsako", and "Who is Who in the Legal profession".

== Kidnap and release ==
Ozekhome was randomly kidnapped on the Benin-Auchi motorway on 23 August 2013 and held for ransom. Four policemen responding in an effort to thwart the kidnapping were killed. The kidnapping garnered considerable media attention. Held along with approximately a dozen others in what he described as a well-organized camp, Ozekhome was released after several weeks when ransom was negotiated with the kidnappers, returning home on 12 September 2013. On 25 September 2013, wanted criminal Kelvin Prosper Oniarah was arrested by a combined security team of the Nigerian Army and DSS operatives for the kidnapping.
