= Israel Oludotun Ransome-Kuti =

Nigerian clergyman and educationist

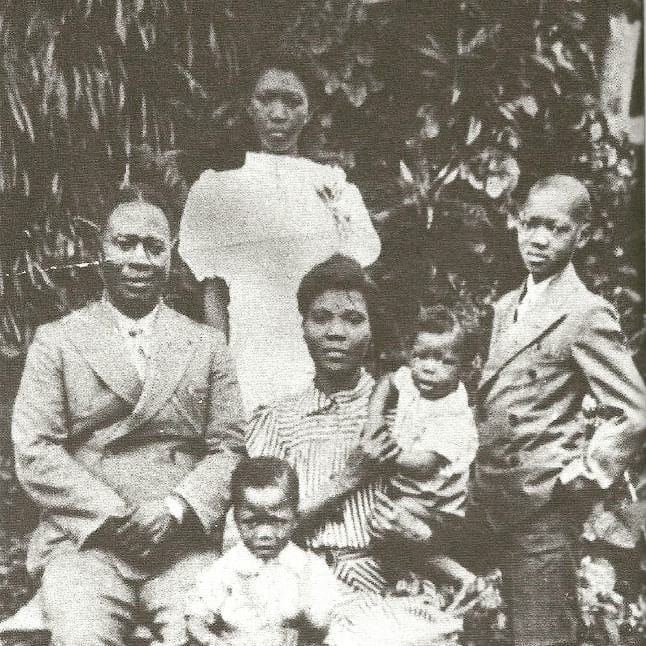
- Reverend Israel and Chief Funmilayo beside him, Dolu is behind and Fela in foreground, baby in arms is Beko, Olikoye is to the right
- Born: 30 April 1891; Abeokuta, Ogun State, Nigeria
- Died: 6 April 1955 (aged 63); Abeokuta, Nigeria
- Education: Fourah Bay College; CMS Grammar School, Lagos
- Occupations: Educationist; activist; clergyman
- Years active: 1916–1954
- Spouse: Funmilayo Ransome-Kuti (m. 1925–1955)
- Children: 4: Olikoye Ransome-Kuti Deceased; Olufela Olusegun Oludotun Ransome-Kuti Deceased; Beko Ransome-Kuti Deceased; Dolupo Ransome-Kuti
- Parent: Josiah Ransome-Kuti Amy Bertha Arinola Ransome-Kuti (Née Olubi)

Notes
- Israel Oludotun Ransome-Kuti was the first President of the Nigeria Union of Teachers

Israel Oludotun Ransome-Kuti (30 April 1891 – 6 April 1955) was a Nigerian teacher.

== Life ==
Israel was born on 30 April 1891 in Abeokuta, Ogun State to Josiah Ransome-Kuti and Bertha Anny Olubi. He completed his primary and secondary school education at Lagos Grammar School and Abeokuta Grammar School respectively before proceeding to Fourah Bay College, Freetown where he completed his undergraduate studies.

Upon his graduation from Fourah Bay College, Israel returned to Nigeria in 1916 to begin his career first as a class teacher at Abeokuta Grammar School until 1918 when he left his hometown. He was appointed as the principal of Ijebu Ode Grammar School for thirteen years and went on to found the Association of Headmasters of Ijebu Schools in 1926.

In 1931, Israel was appointed as the pioneering President of the newly formed Nigeria Union of Teachers, a position he held until his retirement in 1954. Kuti Hall, one of the halls of residence at the University of Ibadan which opened in 1954, is named in his honor.

== Personal life ==
Ransome-Kuti was the father of musician Fela Kuti, and physicians Olikoye Ransome-Kuti and Beko Ransome-Kuti. He was the grandfather of the musician Seun Kuti.

== Death ==
On 6 April 1955, Israel died of a cancer-related illness at his residence in Abeokuta, Ogun State.

== Bibliography ==
- Tunde Adeyanju (1993). The Rev. Israel Oludotun Ransome-Kuti: Teacher and Nation Builder. Litany Nigeria. ISBN 978-978-31846-0-2.
