= Josiah Ransome-Kuti =

Nigerian clergyman (1855–1930)

Josiah Jesse Ransome-Kuti
- Born: Josiah Jesse Olikoye Ransome-Kuti; 1 June 1855; Abeokuta, Ogun State, Nigeria
- Died: 4 September 1930 (aged 75)
- Occupations: clergyman; educationist; composer
- Years active: 1871–1930
- Spouse: Bertha Anny Erinade Olubi (m. 1882)
- Children: 8: Josiah Oluyinka Ransome-Kuti (2/27/1883); Anne Lape Iyabode Ransome-Kuti (10/20/1885); Olufela Daniel Kuti (1887); Israel Oludotun Ransome-Kuti (4/30/1891); Joshua Oluremi Ransome-Kuti (1/6/1894); Susannah Olubade Kuti (1898); Victoria Susannah Tinuade Ransome-Kuti (6/20/1899); Azariah Olusegun Orisale Ransome-Kuti (6/29/1902)
- Parent(s): Likoye Kuti; Anne Ekidan Efupeyin
- Relatives: Wole Soyinka (great grandnephew); Funmilayo Ransome-Kuti (daughter-in-law); Fela Kuti (grandson)

Josiah Jesse "J.J." Ransome-Kuti (1 June 1855 – 4 September 1930) was a Nigerian clergyman and music composer. He was known for setting Christian hymns to indigenous music, and for writing Christian hymns in Yoruba.

== Early life and career ==
Josiah Jesse Olikoye Ransome-Kuti was born on June 1, 1855, in Igbein, Abeokuta, Ogun State. His family were of Egba origin and his parents, Kuti (c. 1820 – 1863) and Anne Ekidan Efupeyin (c. 1830 – July 1877), were both born in Abeokuta as well. Josiah's paternal grandparents, Jamo and Orukoluku, were originally from the town of Orile Igbein in the Egba forest, but had nevertheless been two of the earliest inhabitants of Abeokuta when it was founded in 1830. Josiah Ransome-Kuti was baptized in 1859. He had one sister, Eruwe Lousia Kuti.

While his mother, Anne, was an early convert to Christianity, his father, Kuti, was a follower of the traditional Yoruba religion, and rejected Christianity and European influence in Abeokuta. He was dismayed by his wife's conversion and frequently opposed her in her attempts to influence their son. However, in 1863, Kuti died of guineaworm disease, leaving Anne to raise him as a pious Christian. He enrolled as a student in the Church Missionary Society Training Institution, Abeokuta, before proceeding to the Church Missionary Society Training Institute, Lagos in 1871.

Shortly after completing his education at the Church Missionary Society Training Institute, Lagos, Ransome-Kuti was employed as a teacher at St. Peter's School, Ake, Abeokuta, and then left in 1879 to teach music at the CMS Girls School, Lagos, where he met his wife Bertha Anny Erinade Olubi. In 1891, he was made catechist at the Gbagura Church Parsonage, Abeokuta before he founded Gbagura Church, a local church where he converted people to the Christian faith through his versatility in rendering English gospel hymns into indigenous gospel songs.

Ransome-Kuti became a deacon in 1895, ordained a priest in 1897 and was appointed district judge from 1902 to 1906. In 1911, he was appointed pastor of St. Peter's Cathedral Church, Ake after previously serving as superintendent of the Abeokuta Church Mission.

In 1922, he was made canon of the Cathedral Church of Christ, Lagos and in 1925, he became the first Nigerian to release a record album after he recorded several Yoruba language hymns in gramophone through Zonophone Records.

== Personal life ==
He married Bertha Erina Olubi in 1882, daughter of Rev. Daniel Olubi (1830-1912) and Susannah Olubi (nee Daley) (1821-1924). They had eight children; among them include Anne Lape Iyabode Ransome-Kuti, Azariah Olusegun and Israel Oludotun. He also had children by other wives. As a traveling minister often posted in the CMS outstations, he was in charge of founding new churches in remote areas. His first station was Gbagura district, where he and his wife fostered several children. When they were to leave to Sunken-Ifo district, their next place of assignment, the parents of three children asked for their children to accompany them to Sunren-Ifo. In fact, he and his wife trained and fostered over sixty (60) children. His descendants would go on to constitute the Ransome-Kuti family. His daughter Anne had a daughter, Grace Eniola Soyinka, who was raised by Ransome-Kuti and his wife. In Wole Soyinka's Ake: The Years of Childhood, Soyinka recalls his mother's memory of her grandfather. Here is a timeline of his life.

== Bibliography ==
- Joseph Oguntade (1986). Canon Josiah Jesse Ransome-Kuti: A Short Biography. Gbemi Sodipo Press Limited. ISBN 978-978-183-004-4.
- Isaac Delano, The Singing Minister of Nigeria and The Drummer Boy who became a Canon
  - The Singing Minister of Nigeria
  - The Drummerboy who became a Canon
- Biography of J.J. Ransome-Kuti by Mosunmola Adeojo Biography
