= Abeokuta Women's Revolt =

Nigerian political movement

- Egba Women's Tax Revolt
- Date: 1946; 80 years ago
- Location: Alake's Palace, Abeokuta
- Caused by: Flat rate tax on women
- Goals: End taxation regime; Abolition of direct taxation; Taxation on expatriate companies; Investment in local initiatives and infrastructure; Abolition of the Sole Native Authority and its replacement with a representative form of government
- Methods: Protests
- Result: Abdication of the Alake; Change in the SNA system Temporary abolition of the women's flat tax

Parties
Abeokuta Women's Union; Funmilayo Ransome Kuti; Grace Eniola Soyinka	Alake of Abeokuta; Sole Native Authority; British resident

Number
10,000	

The Abeokuta Women's Revolt (also called the Egba Women's Tax Riot) was a resistance movement led by the Abeokuta Women's Union (AWU) in the late 1940s against the imposition of unfair taxation by the Nigerian colonial government. The women of Abeokuta believed that, under colonialism, their economic roles were declining, while their taxes were increasing. Additionally, they argued that until they were granted representation in local government, they should not be required to pay taxes separately from men. As a result of their protests, four women received seats on the local council, and the taxation of women was ended.

== Early colonialism ==
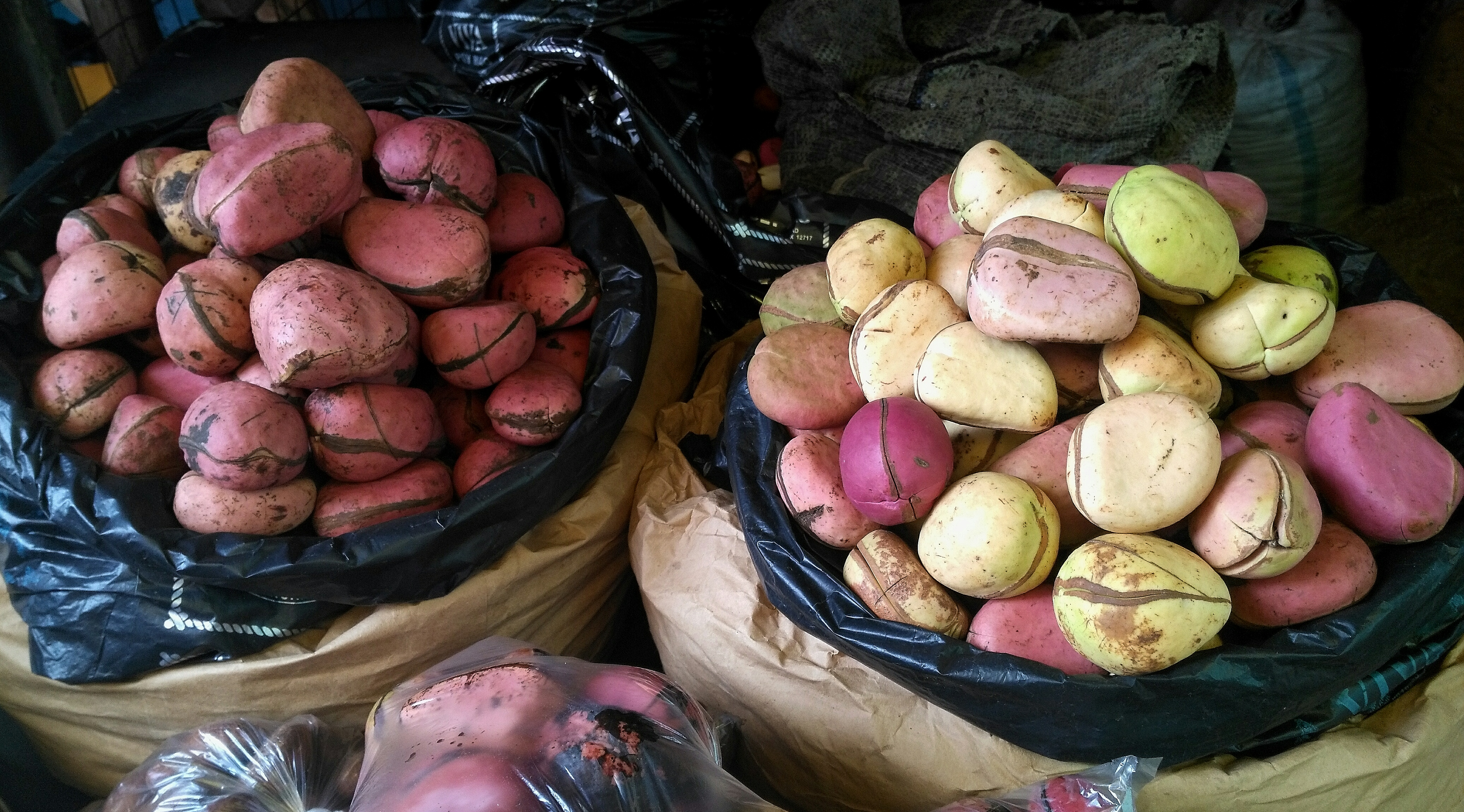
Kola nuts at a Nigerian market

Located in southwest Nigeria and inhabited by the Yoruba, Abeokuta was established in 1830 and was primarily home for the Egba and Owu people. Around 1850, the British colonial government began to extend its control into Abeokuta and negotiate treaties with the native Egba. The treaty agreement granted the British open trade routes through the Egba territory "in exchange for the Lagos government’s recognition of the town’s independence and borders." This treaty had given the Egba people relative autonomy over their own economics, but ultimately, the British government found a means to intervene in the autonomous structure after a political crisis in 1897.

The British government demanded a reorganization of the town's political structure, and thus, the Egba United Government (EUG) was created. Prior to the new structure, local councils traditionally included at least one female. The EUG, by contrast, was exclusively male, but began developing Abeokuta's political and economic infrastructure. The EUG invested in the infrastructure and the economy, building roads and markets and increasing exports of items such as cocoa, palm oil, kola nuts, and indigo-dyed cloth. By the late 1800s, Abeokuta had emerged as an economic center in colonial Nigeria and remained relatively independent.

== Origins of taxation in Abeokuta ==
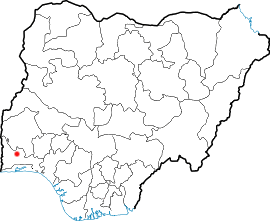
Map of Nigeria indicating the Abeokuta region

It was not until the outbreak of World War I in 1914 that the colonial government gained ground in the disruption of Abeokuta's relative independence. The town became fully incorporated into the colonial state. After the incorporation of Abeokuta, colonial officials faced difficulties with a significant decline in revenue. The war spurred the increase of import duties so as to offset the cost of the government's increased export duties. After a while, the export duties became insufficient so colonial officials requested that the colonial office allow the imposition of direct taxation. This request was refused. In order to alleviate the decline in revenue, local officials began imposing sanitary fines, which largely affected farm and market women. These fines were for violations such as failing to sweep the outside of women's houses. Court summonses for these sanitary fines were not distributed to men. Eventually, the fines were found to be illegal and were abolished. They were then replaced by flat taxes on women, because of the economic need for revenue from women.

On 1 January 1918, Abeokuta residents began paying taxes. From the tax proposal's inception, Egba women were considered separately from the men. The taxation of women was not within the standard model of taxation first used by the colonial government in the Northern region. Rather, this model of taxation was influenced by precolonial Yoruba culture, which did not recognize women as different from men, and therefore expected women to generate income independently of men. Since there were no women in the EUG council, the colonial taxation emerged as an instance of taxation without representation.

Six months after the imposition of the tax, a revolt occurred in Abeokuta known as the Adubi war. The revolt consisted of thirty thousand rebels destroying much of the railway and telegraphs lines south of Abeokuta along with the murder of a European trading agent and a high-ranking Egba chief. After the colonial government quelled the revolt, it made some minor structural and collection changes, but did not remove the tax on women.

== Women’s revolt ==
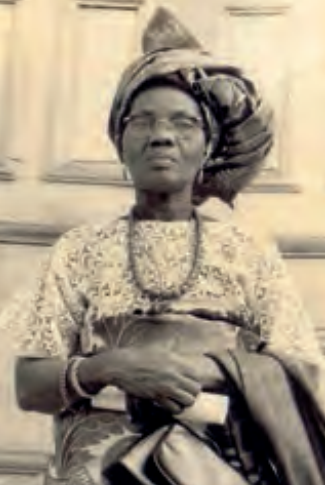
Abeokuta Women's Union (AWU) leader Funmilayo Ransome-Kuti

As a result of the oppressive tax conditions, the Abeokuta Women's Union (AWU) emerged under the leadership of Funmilayo Ransome-Kuti, a headteacher of a local school, who had heard of the struggles of the market women. She was joined in the leadership by her niece-in-law Grace Eniola Soyinka. The AWU, "an explicitly political organization uniting the working class market women and middle class women like Ransome-Kuti and Soyinka, was designed to challenge both colonial rule and the patriarchal structure." In order to end the taxation regime, the AWU wrote "proposals to replace the flat rate tax on women, on with taxation on expatriate companies, investment in local initiatives and infrastructure including transportation, sanitation and education and the abolition of the Sole Native Authority and its replacement with a representative form of government, including women." The women of the AWU were effective organizers, who fought against the colonial government, with different types of resistance tactics. Many women refused to pay the tax and either ended up in jail or fined.

However, the Abeokuta Women's Union did not relent in their efforts and continued to send out several petitions to the Alake of Abeokuta between August 1946 and May 1947. On 5 October 1946, an AWU delegation met with the Alake but there was still no result. The situation took a turn for the worse when the Alake increased "the flat-rate tax on women, an action supported by the British resident." It was then that the AWU began their mass protests, such as marching outside the king's palace and demanding the abolishment of direct taxation. "In mid- October 1946, Funmilayo Ransome-Kuti led nearly a thousand women in a march to the palace to protest the increase." The response from the colonial authorities was brutal. They deployed tear gas and administered beatings on the women.

Despite the dangerous circumstances, the AWU continued to protest and released a document called the AWU's Grievances in 1947 that detailed all their accusations against the Alake and the SNA. Following the list of grievances, the women once again held a demonstration outside the Alake's palace which lasted for two days. There were over ten thousand women in attendance.

"During the protest, the women used songs such as the one translated below to ridicule the Alake: Idowu [Alake], for a long time you have used your penis as a mark of authority that you are our husband. Today we shall reverse the order and use our vagina to play the role of husband on you... O you men, vagina’s head will seek vengeance."

The protest resulted in the government authorities promising the women that "taxation would be suspended and the final decisions on the issue communicated to them within three days". Unfortunately, this turned out to be another empty promise "as more assaults were committed and more arrests made". Undaunted, the women organized another protest. Once again on 8 December, "over ten thousand women camped outside the palace, refusing to leave until all the women who had been arrested were released. They left the palace on the 10th when the incarcerated women were released." After this incident, the AWU continued to send their petitions to the British administration and eventually they claimed victory. On 3 January 1949, "the Alake abdicated from the throne and the SNA system was changed and four women had positions in the new system of administration." Some of these successes were later overturned (the Alake would return to power, and the flat tax on women was only temporarily abolished).

The Abeokuta Women's Union had been victorious in colonial Nigeria, but did not stop there. The women continued to advocate for women's rights in Nigeria and play a role in Nigerian nationalist movements. The group emerged as one of the first proto-nationalist feminist activist groups in Nigeria. Funmilayo Ransome Kuti would go on to serve as both a political leader and a titled chieftain in the colonial era.
