= Margaret Strobel =

American historian

Margaret Strobel (born 1946) is a retired US academic. She studied the history of African women during European colonialism and ran the Women's Studies Program at University of Illinois Chicago.

== Early life ==
Margaret Ann Strobel was born February 15, 1946, in Grand Forks, North Dakota in the United States. She attended schools in Grand Forks and St. Louis, Missouri, then studied at Michigan State University on a National Merit Scholarship. Strobel took her PhD in African studies at UCLA on a Fulbright-Hays Scholarship in 1975, having decided to write her dissertation on African women's history. This joined together her research interests on both feminism and African history.

== Career ==
Strobel worked first at UCLA and then San Diego State University as a lecturer and then became associate professor in women's studies and history at the University of Illinois Chicago, becoming professor in 1986. She also ran the Women's Studies Program. Her first book was Muslim Women in Mombasa, 1890–1975 (published 1979) which pioneered the study of African women during European colonialism. In 1991, Strobel released European Women and the Second British Empire which tracked the history of European women in colonial countries. The following year she edited Expanding the Boundaries of Women's History: Essays on Women in the Third World together with Cheryl Johnson-Odim. This book examined various histories of women in the nineteenth and twentieth centuries. A reviewer for the Journal of World History commented "with books like Strobel's, we can now say that we have an idea of the lives of women as well as men".

Strobel received fellowships from the National Endowment for the Humanities and the Woodrow Wilson Foundation. In 1993, the University of Illinois Chicago presented her with an award for teaching excellence and as of 2023, she was professor emerita of Gender and Women's Studies there.

== Personal life ==
Strobel married a fellow academic and together they had one child.

== Selected works ==
- (eds) Johnson-Odim, C. & Strobel, M. (1992) Expanding the Boundaries of Women's History: Essays on Women in the Third World
- Strobel, M. (1991) European Women and the Second British Empire
- Strobel, M. (1979) Muslim Women in Mombasa, 1890–1975
