= Grace Soyinka =

Nigerian shopkeeper and activist (1908–1983

- Born: Grace Eniola Jenkins-Harrison; 1908
- Died: 1983 (aged 75)
- Occupations: Businesswoman; Women's rights activist
- Spouse: Samuel Ayodele Soyinka
- Children: 7, including Wole Soyinka
- Relatives: Funmilayo Ransome-Kuti (aunt-in-law)

Grace Eniola Soyinka (née Jenkins-Harrison; 1908–1983) was a Nigerian shopkeeper, activist, and member of the aristocratic Ransome-Kuti family.

She co-founded the Abeokuta Women's Union with Funmilayo Ransome-Kuti, her aunt-in-law. They protested against taxes introduced by the Alake of Abeokuta, the ruler backed by the colonial authorities. They withheld the taxes, and eventually the Alake abdicated. The union, which had a membership of 20,000 women, eventually evolved into the national organisation the Nigerian Women's Union.

She grew up in the household of her grandfather, the clergyman and composer Josiah Ransome-Kuti. Her mother, Rev. Ransome-Kuti's first daughter, Anne Lape Iyabode Ransome-Kuti, married a Mr. Jenkins-Harrison. In childhood Grace Eniola had been sent to live with her grandparents, uncles and aunts, to all of whom she was close. She is often erroneously referred to as Rev. Ransome-Kuti's daughter. She married Samuel Ayodele Soyinka, an Anglican minister. The second of their seven children was Wole Soyinka, writer and 1986 winner of the Nobel Prize in literature. Wole Soyinka gives an account of his parents' home life and his mother’s activism in his 1981 memoir Aké: The Years of Childhood. In it, he called Grace "Wild Christian", in reference to her devout Anglicanism.

She died in 1983, at the age of 75.
