= Nina Mba =

Australian author

Chief Nina Emma Mba (29 April 1944 – 14 January 2002) was a Nigerian-Australian author, academic historian and editor. Based in Nigeria for most of her career, she taught at the University of Lagos, was a member of the Historical Society of Nigeria and a founding member of the Women's Research and Documentation Center at the University of Ibadan. Her 1982 work Nigerian women mobilized was the first book to be written on the role of Nigerian women in politics.

== Biography ==
Mba was born in Sydney, Australia as Nina Emma Gantman to a Russian-Jewish father, Joseph Gantman, and a New Zealand mother, Dorothy. Her father was born in Minsk, and he moved with his family to Germany during the Russian Revolution of 1917. From there he escaped the holocaust by moving to Australia. Nina was one of three children and is survived by her younger sister, Naomi Linda Wickens (nee Gantman), and the youngest of the three, her brother David Evsor Gantman.

She met her husband at a university in Australia and the couple soon left Australia for Nigeria in 1966. She completed a PhD in History at the University of Ibadan and her thesis was later published in 1982. She joined the History Department of University of Lagos where she was a participator and writer in the field of women's history and studies. She contributed to the growth of research and teaching of women's history and studies in the country, opening up the issue of women participation in the historical development of the country.

She was also a columnist for Vanguard Newspaper and wrote a column titled "Insider/Outsider".

In 2001, in recognition of her achievements, Mba was conferred with the chieftaincy title Odu of Umudei in Anambra State.

She died in 2002 after a short illness.

== Works ==
- Mba, Nina Emma (1982). Nigerian Women Mobilized: Women's Political Activity in Southern Nigeria, 1900-1965. Institute of International Studies, University of California, Berkeley. ISBN 978-0-87725-148-4.
- Mba, Nina Emma (1992). Ayo Rosiji: man with vision. Spectrum Books. ISBN 978-978-2461-32-2.
- Osinulu, Clara; Mba, Nina Emma, eds. (1996). Nigerian Women in Politics, 1986-1993. Malthouse Press. ISBN 978-978-023-030-2.
- Johnson-Odim, Cheryl; Mba, Nina Emma (1997). For Women and the Nation: Funmilayo Ransome-Kuti of Nigeria. University of Illinois Press. ISBN 978-0-252-06613-9.
