= Abeokuta Grammar School =

Public school in Abeokuta, Ogun State, Nigeria

Coordinates: 7.350°N 3.894°E

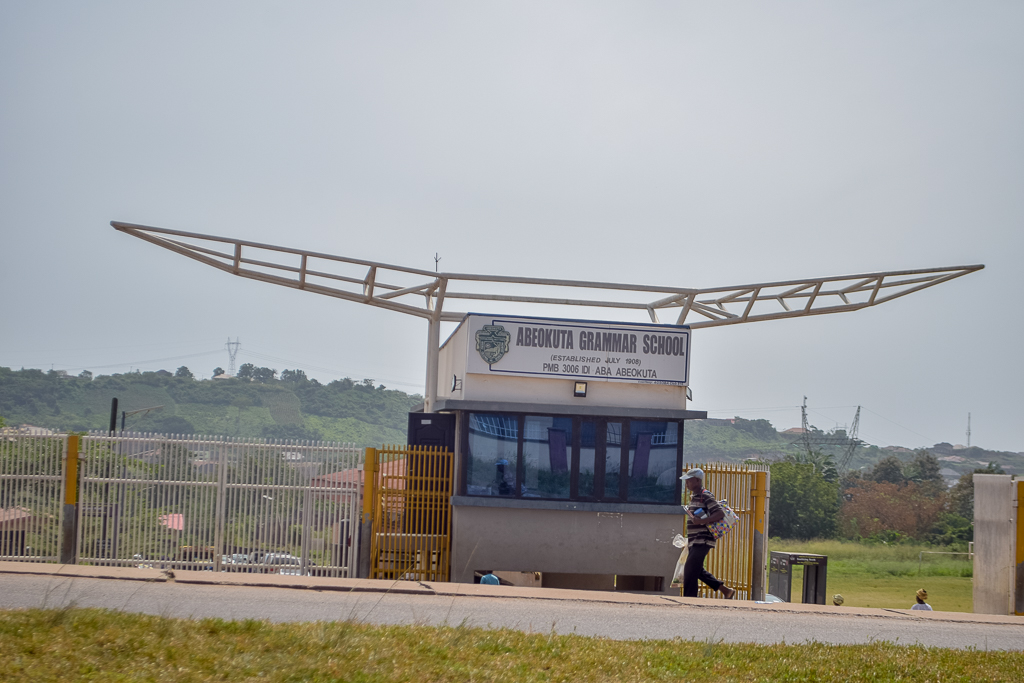

Location
- Elite Road, Idi Aba; Abeokuta, Ogun State; Nigeria

Information
- Type: Public
- Motto: Iberu Oluwa Ni Ipile Ogbon (Yoruba) (The Fear Of God Is The Beginning Of The Wisdom)
- Religious affiliation: Anglican Communium
- Established: 1908
- Sister school: Abeokuta Girls Grammar School
- Faculty: 3
- Grades: JSS1 - SSS3
- Colors: Blue and gold
- Nobel laureates: Wole Soyinka

Abeokuta Grammar School is a secondary school in the city of Abeokuta, Ogun State, Nigeria. It is currently located at Idi-Aba area, of Abeokuta. Often called the first grammar school in Nigeria, it is attended by students from all parts of Nigeria, the West Coast of Africa, South Africa, Europe and even Asia.

== History ==
The school was founded in 1908 by the Abeokuta District Church Council (Anglicans). The school is associated with many notable figures from Nigerian politics and the arts, including the teacher and political activist Funmilayo Ransome-Kuti, and her son, the musician Fela Anikulapo-Kuti.

Academically, students of Abeokuta Grammar School entered for examination by the Royal College of Preceptors in 1909 and sat for the Cambridge Local Examination in 1911. It became a mixed institution in 1914 with the admission of girls. In 1939, the school presented students for the Cambridge School Certificate Examination, and in 1996 was elevated to the status of a Model School by the Nigerian government.

AGSOBA is an association of old students (boys and girls) of Abeokuta Grammar School and is the oldest students association in Nigeria. Headed by a national body known as the Central Executive Committee with its headquarters in Abeokuta, the association operates through branches all over Nigeria and the world.

A team of three students from Abeokuta Grammar School in Ogun State has emerged the national winner in the Social and Innovation Category at the 2019 National Pitch Event for the Diamond Challenge. It was held at the Youth Development Center of the Olusegun Obasanjo Presidential Library.

== Notable alumni ==
- Hezekiah Oluwasanmi
- Wole Soyinka
- Beko Ransome-Kuti
- Fela Anikulapo Kuti
- Okunade Sijuade
- Tunde Kelani
- Funmilayo Ransome-Kuti
- Dotman
- Fireboy DML
- Kizz Daniel
- Iziaq Adekunle Salako
- Jumoke Odetola
- Lai Labode
- Sobulo Folahan

== Photo gallery ==
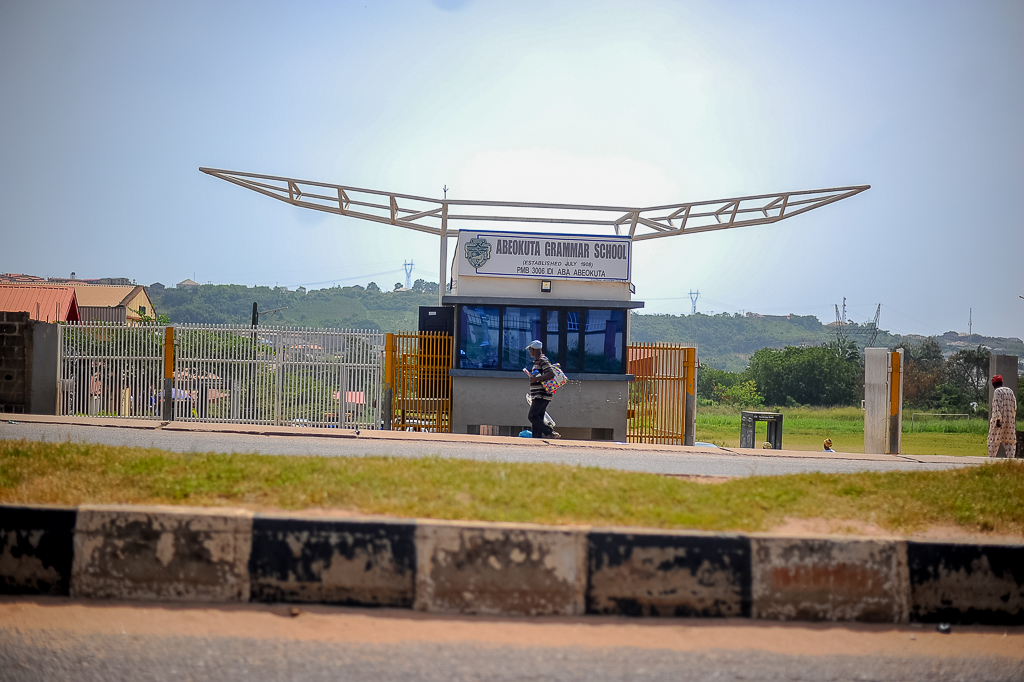

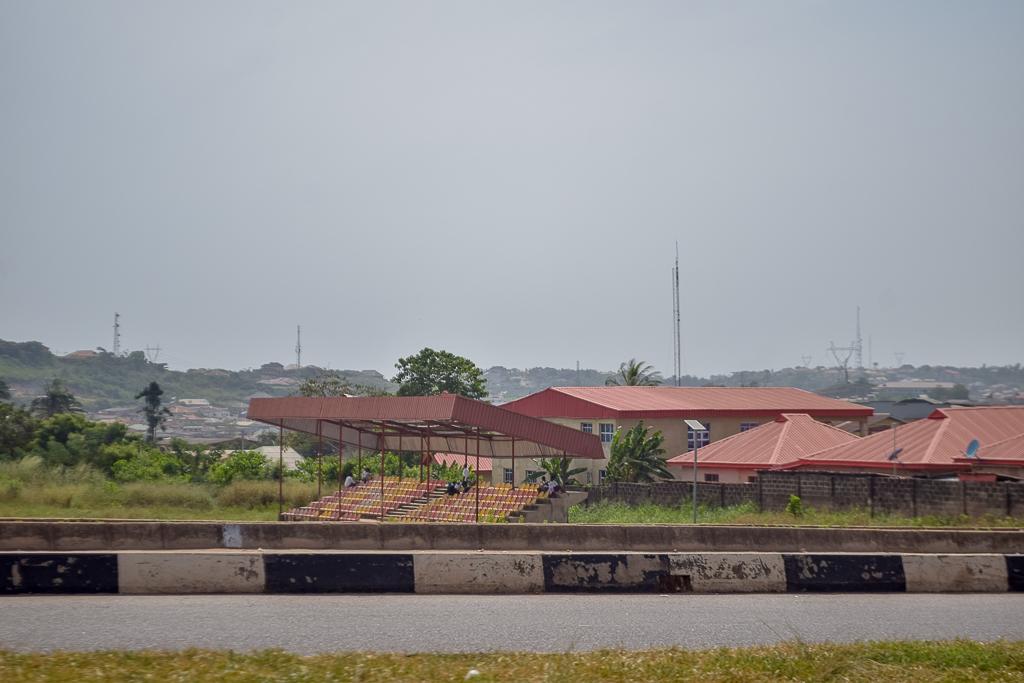
