= Kelvin (kidnapper) =

Nigerian kidnapper

Kelvin Ibruvwe or Kelvin Oniarah mononymously known as Kelvin is a Nigerian kidnapper. He was arrested on 25 September 2013 by a joint team of the Nigerian army and Department of State Security Services. He hails from Kokori in Ethiope-East Local Government Area of Delta State. He founded a group known as Liberation Movement of the Urhobo People (LIMUP).
