= Nigeria Union of Teachers =

Trade union in Nigeria

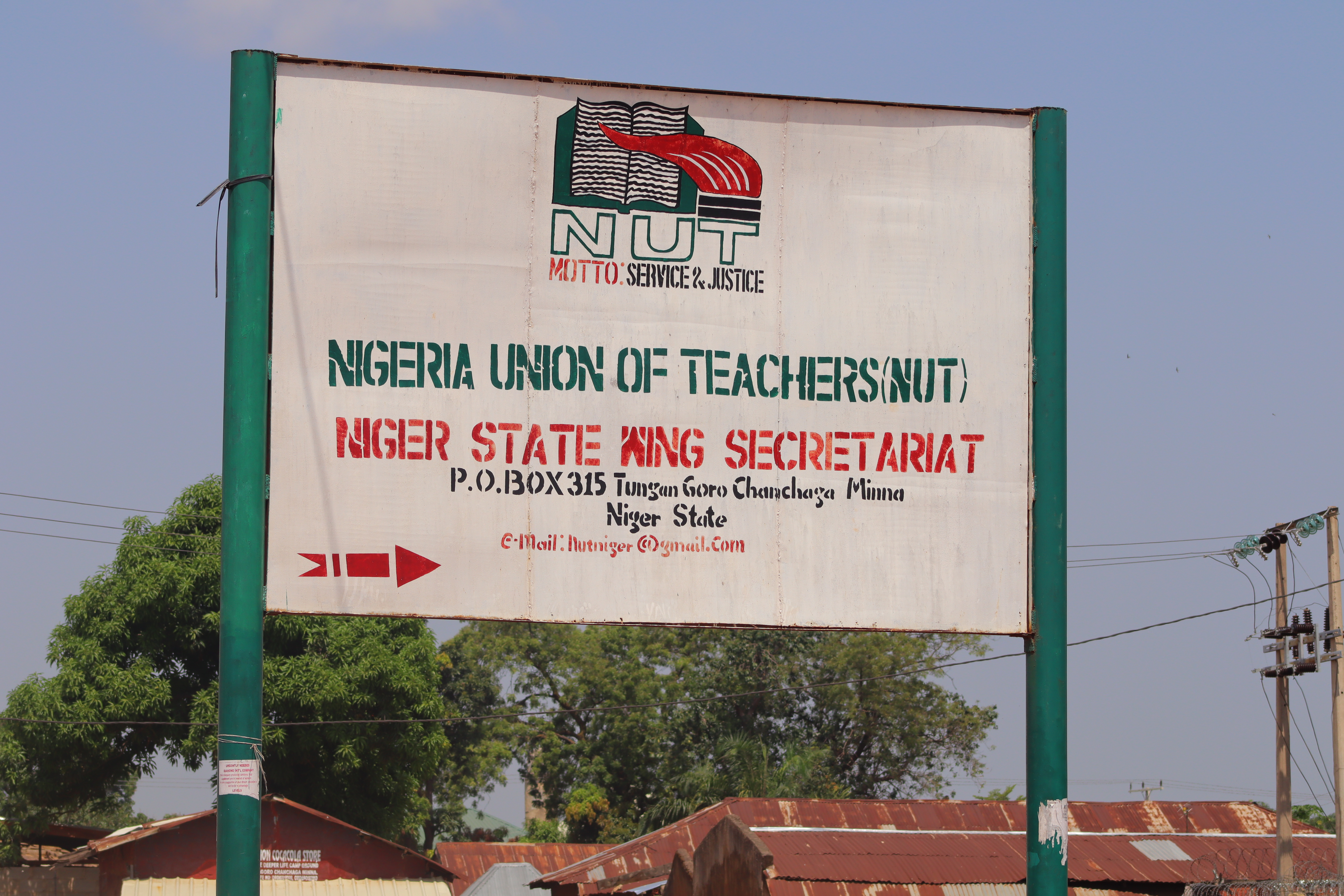
Signpost for the National Union of Teachers in Minna, Niger state, Nigeria

Nigeria Union of Teachers is a major trade union in Nigeria. It was formed to create a united front for practitioners of the teaching profession in the country. Major objectives of the union covers the improvement in economic conditions of teachers, an avenue for bringing forth ideas about the educational development of the country from the perspectives of teachers and general economic security for teachers in the country.

== History ==
The union was formally inaugurated in 1931, it came about partly as a result of vulnerabilities exposed by the Great Depression, which led to cuts in teachers salaries and a seeming lack of job security.

The use of irregular and unpredictable educational codes for teachers and salary cuts led to an increase in teachers associations mushrooming in various southern Nigerian cities, particularly in Calabar, Lagos, and Abeokuta. The various associations, however, realized that harmonizing the objectives of the groups to bring about a united front will create a powerful vocal union for the interest of the teachers. On July 8, 1931, the teachers associations of Lagos, Agege, Abeokuta, Ibadan, Calabar and Ijebu-Ode joined together to form the Nigeria Union of Teachers. The first president of the group and chairman of the July 1931 meeting was the Rev. Oludotun Ransome Kuti, the husband of Chief Funmilayo Ransome-Kuti and father of Fela Anikulapo Kuti.

On Children's Day, May 27, 1972, Chief Omoz Oarhe, the N.U.T. president, oversaw the merger with the Northern State Teachers Union, an association founded by Mallam Aminu Kano and a few northern Nigerian teachers in 1948.

To some extent, the union has lived up to it expectations as it has provided an umbrella body for the teachers of the country. Several strike actions were embarked upon at the instance of the union.
