= Funmilayo Ransome-Kuti =

Nigerian activist (1900–1978)

Chief Funmilayo Ransome-Kuti MON
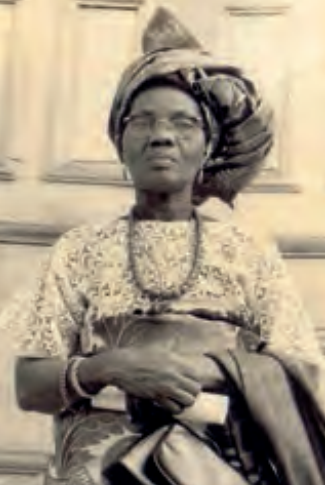
- Ransome-Kuti in 1970

Member of the Western House of Chiefs
- In office 1950s–1966
- Appointed by: Sir John Dalzell Rankine
- Oloye of the Yoruba People

Personal details
- Born: Frances Abigail Olufunmilayo Olufela Folorunso Thomas; 25 October 1900 Abeokuta, Southern Nigeria
- Died: 13 April 1978 (aged 77) Lagos, Nigeria
- Spouse: Israel Oludotun Ransome-Kuti (m. 1925; died 1955)
- Children: Dolupo Ransome-Kuti (daughter); Olikoye Ransome-Kuti (son); Fela Anikulapo-Kuti (son); Beko Ransome-Kuti (son)
- Relatives: Femi Kuti (grandson); Seun Kuti (grandson); Wole Soyinka (grand nephew); Yeni Kuti (granddaughter); Yemisi Ransome-Kuti (niece); Made Kuti (great-grandson)
- Occupation: Educator; politician; women's rights activist
- Awards: Lenin Peace Prize (1970)

Chief Funmilayo Ransome-Kuti MON (Note: /fʊnmi ˈlaɪjoʊ ˈrænsəm ˈkuːti/) (born Frances Abigail Olufunmilayo Olufela Folorunso Thomas; 25 October 1900 – 13 April 1978), also known as Funmilayo Aníkúlápó-Kuti, was a Nigerian educator, political organizer, and women's rights advocate who intellectually engaged with anti-imperialist, Pan-Africanist, and feminist ideologies. Ransome-Kuti also identified herself as an African Socialist.

Funmilayo Ransome-Kuti was born in Abeokuta, in Ogun State, Nigeria. She was the first female student to attend the Abeokuta Grammar School. As a young adult, she worked as a teacher, organizing some of the earliest preschool classes in the country and arranging literacy classes for lower-income women, laying important foundations for feminist education scholarship in Africa.

During the 1940s, Ransome-Kuti established the Abeokuta Women's Union, and advocated for women’s rights in Nigeria, demanding better representation of women in local governing bodies and an end to unfair taxes on market women. Ransome-Kuti led marches and protests of up to 10,000 women, forcing the ruling Alake of Egbaland to temporarily abdicate in 1949. As Ransome-Kuti’s political influence grew, she took part in the Nigerian independence movement, attending conferences and joining overseas delegations to discuss proposed national constitutions. Spearheading the creation of both the Nigerian Women’s Union and the Federation of Nigerian Women’s Societies, she advocated for women's suffrage in Nigeria. She became a noted member of international peace and women's rights movements.

Ransome-Kuti became vice president of the Women's International Democratic Federation (WIDF) in 1953, and would later lead the Nigerian branch of the Women's International League for Peace and Freedom (WILPF) in 1963. While in these roles, Ransome-Kuti helped build connections between Nigeria's independence movement and feminist, anti-colonial networks around the world. Her international work also drew political attention; British colonial authorities refused to renew her passport in 1957 and the United States denied her a visa in 1958, both citing suspected communist ties during the Cold War era.

Ransome-Kuti received the Lenin Peace Prize, and was also awarded membership in the meritorious Order of the Niger for her work. In her later years, she supported her sons' criticism of Nigeria's military governments.

Funmalayo Ransome-Kuti died at the age of 77, after being wounded in a military raid on family property.

Ransome-Kuti's had three children: a son, the musician and activist Fela Kuti (born Olufela Ransome-Kuti, d. 1997); a younger son, activist and physician Beko Ransome-Kuti (d. 2006); and an older son, a paediatrician, long-time professor of medicine and public health (in Africa and the United States), and former Health Minister of Nigeria, Olikoye Ransome-Kuti (d. 2004).

== Early life and education ==
Frances Abigail Olufunmilayo Olufela Folorunso Thomas was born on 25 October 1900, in Abeokuta, Ogun State, Nigeria, which at the time was a part of the Southern Nigeria Protectorate, a Protectorate of the British Empire. She was born to Chief Daniel Olumeyuwa Thomas, a member of the aristocratic Jibolu-Taiwo family, and Lucretia Phyllis Omoyeni Adeosolu. Her father farmed and traded palm produce, while her mother worked as a dressmaker.

Frances' paternal lineage was rooted in the Saro community, which consisted of returnees from Sierra Leone, many of whom were formerly enslaved Africans who had been freed and resettled in Freetown prior to returning to Yorubaland in the 19th century.

Her father was born to Ebenezer Sobowale Thomas, who was himself born in Freetown, Sierra Leone, and Abigail Fakemi, who was born in the Yoruba town of Ilesa. Frances' oldest known paternal ancestor was her great-grandmother, Sarah Taiwo (mother of Ebenezer Sobowale Thomas), a Yoruba woman who had been captured by slave traders in the early 19th century before eventually returning home to her family in Abeokuta. Sarah's first husband was Sobowale Thomas. Sarah's descendants through Thomas and her other two husbands – the Jibolu-Taiwos – became some of the first Christians in the area, and had a large influence on the growth of Christianity in Abeokuta.

Frances' mother was born to Isaac Adeosolu, who was from Abeokuta, and Harriet, the daughter of Adeboye, who was from the ancient Yoruba town of Ile-Ife. Her parents married in 1897, and they had two children who died in infancy before Frances was born.

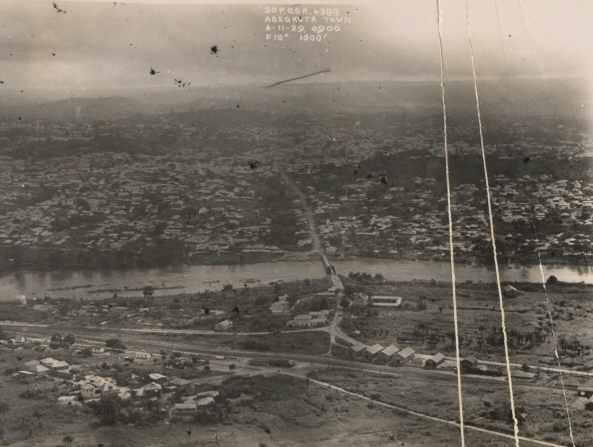
Abeokuta in 1929

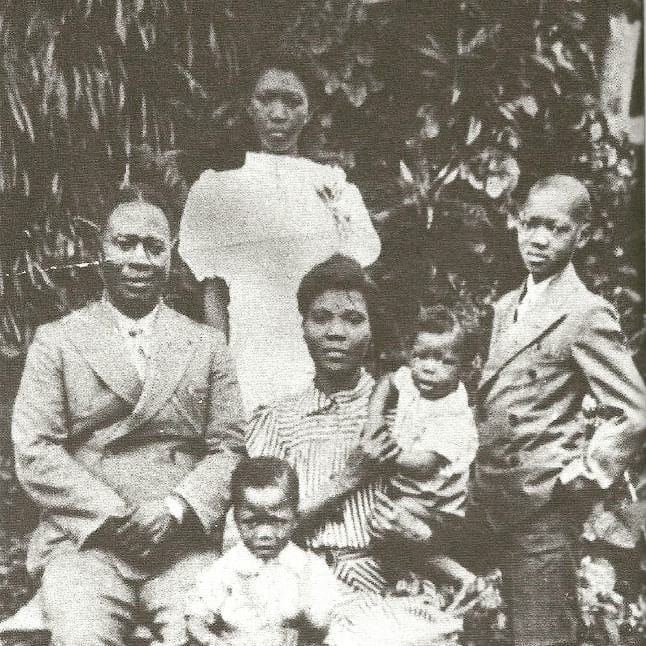
Funmilayo Ransome-Kuti (centre) with husband and children c. 1940

Although it was uncommon at the time for Nigerian families to invest in much education for girls, Frances' parents believed in the importance of education for both boys and girls. She attended Abeokuta Grammar School for her secondary education. The school had initially been open only to male students, but it admitted its first female students in 1914, and Frances was first among the six girls registered for study that year. From 1919 to 1922, she attended Wincham Hall School for Girls in Cheshire, England, where she learned elocution, music, dressmaking, French, and various domestic skills. Before she completed her studies and returned to Abeokuta in 1922, she stopped using her Christian names, Frances and Abigail, and chose to go by her Yoruba name of Funmilayo, which means "God has given me joy".

== Personal life ==
On 20 January 1925, Funmilayo married Reverend Israel Oludotun Ransome-Kuti, a member of the Ransome-Kuti family. Israel had studied at the Abeokuta Grammar School several years ahead of Funmilayo, and while she was still in school the two had developed a friendship followed by a courtship. Israel found work as a school principal, and he strongly believed in bringing people together and overcoming ethnic and regional divisions. He later became a co-founder of both the Nigeria Union of Teachers and of the Nigerian Union of Students. His marriage with Funmilayo would last 30 years – until Israel's death – and was marked by a sense of equality and deep mutual respect between the couple.

After marriage, Funmilayo Ransome-Kuti had quit her old job as a teacher, but she soon found other projects. In 1928 she established one of the first preschool classes in Nigeria. Around the same time, she started a club for young women of elite families to encourage their "self-improvement", while also organizing classes for illiterate women. Between 1935 and 1936, the couple arranged to purchase a secondhand car and had it shipped to them from England. Ransome-Kuti was therefore the first woman in Abeokuta to drive a car.

Ransome-Kuti and her husband, part of the Yoruban Ransome-Kuti lineage, had four children: a firstborn daughter, Dolupo ("Dolu", a nurse; (1922-2010)), and sons Olikoye "Koye" (1927), Olufela "Fela" (1938), and Bekololari "Beko" (1940).

== Activism ==
=== Abeokuta Women's Union ===
In 1932, Ransome-Kuti had helped establish the Abeokuta Ladies Club. The club focused on charity work, sewing, catering and adult education classes, and its early members were mostly Christian, Western-educated women from the middle class. By the 1940s, however, the club was moving in a more political direction. Inspired by an illiterate friend who asked her for help learning how to read, Ransome-Kuti began organizing literacy workshops for market women through the club, and she subsequently gained a greater understanding of social and political inequalities faced by many Nigerian women. Writing about the freedoms granted by her own more privileged background, Ransome-Kuti noted that "the true position of Nigerian women had to be judged from "the women who carried babies on their backs and farmed from sunrise to sunset … not women who used tea, sugar, and flour for breakfast". In 1944 she developed a successful campaign to stop local authorities seizing rice from market women under false pretenses.

In 1946, the club was formally renamed the Abeokuta Women's Union (AWU), now open to all women in Abeokuta. The organization now turned its focus to fighting unfair price controls and taxes imposed on market women, with Ransome-Kuti as the AWU's president. She had founded the union along with Grace Eniola Soyinka (her husband's niece and the mother of Nobel Laureate Wole Soyinka), and the AWU gradually grew to represent 20,000 official members, with up to 100,000 additional supporters. In an effort to unify women and avoid class conflict, Ransome-Kuti and other formally educated members spoke Yoruba and wore traditional Yoruba clothing to union meetings and events.

In 1918, the colonial administration in Abeokuta introduced a gender-differentiated tax that required girls to pay from age 15, which was three years earlier than boys were expected to pay at age 18. There was also coercion involved in the process of collecting taxes, as the agents would sometimes strip women of their clothes under the guise of trying to verify their age, and those who were unable to pay were often jailed. At the time of the AWU's campaign in the late 1940s, local women had faced three decades of taxation without representation in government; this became a primary grievance and a slogan of the AWU.

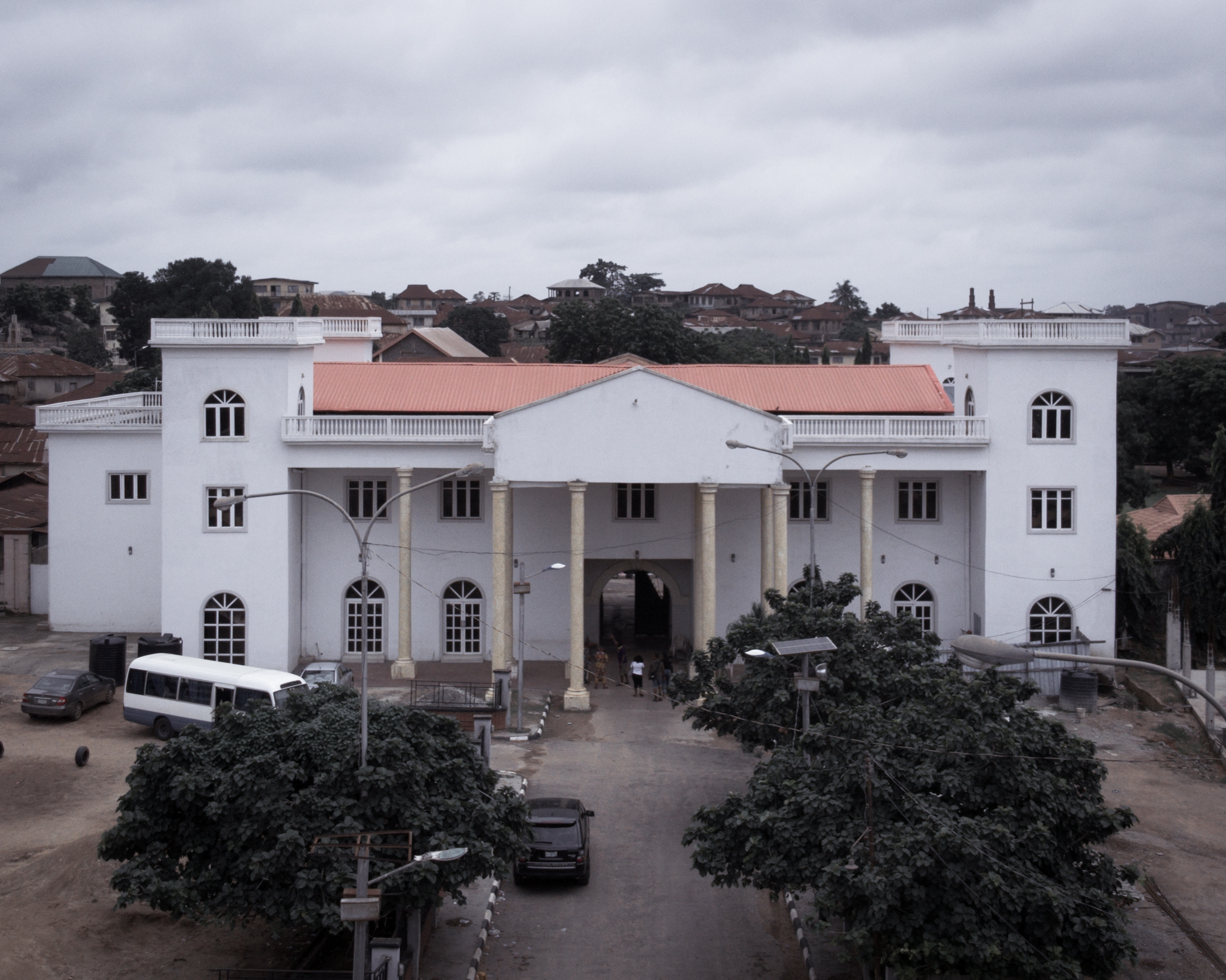
The Alake's palace in Abeokuta

Ransome-Kuti's first well-known political activity came when she led the AWU in a protest against a tax on women. In Abeokuta, alongside regular taxes for income and water usage, market women were also forced to pay a special tax that went directly to market supervisors or "parakoyis". The Alake Ademola II, a local traditional ruler of Abeokuta who now became part of the colonial administration via indirect rule, had imposed taxes on women after the Egba Native Administration had been established in 1914. After a failed appeal to British authorities to remove the current Alake from power and halt the tax, Ransome-Kuti and the AWU began contacting newspapers and circulating petitions. Aiming to put more pressure on authorities, AWU members publicly refused to pay their taxes, staged long vigils outside the Alake's palace, and arranged an audit of the Sole Native Authority System (SNA) finance records. Along with their objective of ending the tax on women, they demanded representation for women on the SNA's executive council.

By late 1947, Abeokuta authorities began forbidding women from organizing parades or demonstrations, denying them the necessary permits. Undeterred, Ransome-Kuti and her fellow organizers declared that they were planning "picnics" and "festivals" instead, drawing up to 10,000 participants to their demonstrations – some of which involved altercations with police. Ransome-Kuti trained women in how to deal with the tear gas canisters sometimes thrown at them, and the AWU used its membership dues to fund legal representation for arrested members. According to one story, when a British district officer shouted at Ransome-Kuti to shut her women up, she responded "You may have been born, but you were not bred! Would you speak to your mother like that?" The West African Pilot described her as the "Lioness of Lisabi" as a result.

Tensions between AWU protesters and authorities came to a head in February 1948 when the Alake compared AWU women to "vipers that could not be tamed" and banned Ransome-Kuti from entering the palace for political meetings. Immediately afterwards, AWU members blocked the palace entrance and refused to let the visiting British district officer leave. The incident concluded with a scuffle when Ransome-Kuti grabbed hold of the steering wheel of the district officer's car and refused to let go "until he pried her hand loose". Public sympathy grew in support of the women. Throughout early 1948, AWU members continued to protest the tax, fighting with petitions, press conferences, letters to newspapers, and demonstrations. After more demonstrations in late April of that year, the Alake finally responded to the women's demands, suspending the tax on women and appointing a special committee to look into the AWU's complaints.

The AWU was able to temporarily oust the then Alake in 1949 by using both political and cultural techniques.It did this through petitions, press conferences, and submissions to newspapers, and also by singing insulting Yoruba songs outside the Alake's palace as a method of public shaming. Ransome-Kuti's work in the AWU attracted national attention, as the event was covered not only in Abeokuta's newspapers, but by papers throughout Nigeria more broadly. Nigerian writer Wole Soyinka would later recount the effect of these protests in his 1981 memoir Ake: The Years of Childhood. The revolt also had some constitutional effects, including the abolition of the flat-rate tax, and the appointment of Ransome-Kuti and four other women to the interim council which governed the region until it was replaced by another permanent council; this was the first time that women had formal representation in the region's politics.

Although the AWU had achieved female representation at the local level, it was not done with its political work. In 1952, the Abeokuta administration imposed a new water tax on women to fund a new water supply system. Women had been exempt from water tax since 1948. Ransome-Kuti and other women refused to pay the tax and were ultimately arrested, then rearrested when protests started back up. The water tax on women was not repealed until 1960, thus the AWU served as an important body to apply political pressure throughout that time.

=== National Work ===
In 1947, Nigerian anti-colonialist Nnamdi Azikiwe invited Ransome-Kuti to join the seven-person NCNC delegation to London, England, to protest the 1946 Richards Constitution. This constitution, which was named after Nigeria's governor-general, Sir Arthur Richards, was designed to increase indigenous Nigerian democratic participation, while not extending those rights to women. The constitution also maintained a mostly European majority on the Executive Council by a nomination system, instead of representative elections. Ransome-Kuti was the sole woman in the delegation; they departed for London on 26 June 1947.

While she was in London, Ransome-Kuti spoke to groups such as the London Women's Parliamentary Committee and the National Federation of Women's Institutes. She argued that colonial rule forced women out of power, both politically and economically. She also wrote an article titled "We Had Equality 'til Britain Came" in the Daily Worker , where she further argued that Yoruba women used to own property, trade freely, and hold authority, until colonialism forced them into inferior roles in society. This perspective places her in the intellectual tradition that scholars such as Cheryl Johnson Odim credit as shaping African feminist and Third World feminist theory. The article was condemned by the Alake and elite women's organizations, though it had support from market women and the political left.

When a Western Provinces conference was held in Nigeria in 1949 to discuss a new national constitution, Ransome-Kuti represented Abeokuta and was once again the only woman involved in the discussions. She made strong arguments for the inclusion of women's enfranchisement and against the creation of an indirect electoral system.

In May 1949, Ransome-Kuti proposed the creation of the Nigerian Women's Union (NWU) in order to better support women's rights and enfranchisement across the country. The AWU supported her proposal, and the organization subsequently became the Abeokuta branch of the NWU. Over the next several years, Ransome-Kuti travelled widely to help set up NWU branches in towns and cities all over Nigeria. She served as president of both the NWU and her hometown union in Abeokuta. The NWU pursued goals of achieving women's suffrage, dismantling electoral colleges, and supporting a more balanced representation of women in politics.

Ransome-Kuti was a founding member of the NCNC party, and in 1951 she ran as an NCNC candidate for the regional assembly but was unsuccessful, in part because a special tax requirement for voters meant that many of her supporters – particularly women – were disqualified from participating. She acted as treasurer for the NCNC Western Working Committee and later President of the NCNC Women's Organization in the Western Region.

Within the NCNC, Ransome-Kuti served as treasurer while also leading the party's women's group across the Western region; she was the sole female member serving in a leadership role. She was also the only woman nominated by delegates to speak on behalf of the Abeokuta contingent during key talks at the General Constitutional Conference to help shape Nigeria's constitution from 1948 - 1951.

In 1953, Ransome-Kuti organized a conference in Abeokuta to discuss women's suffrage and political representation, and 400 women delegates attended the two-day event. The participants subsequently formed the Federation of Nigerian Women's Societies (FNWS). The FNWS campaigned for women's political inclusion, improved educational opportunities, and the creation of new social services and healthcare.

During the early 1950s, Ransome-Kuti was appointed to the Western House of Chiefs, being granted the chieftaincy title of Oloye of the Yoruba people and the subsidiary title of Beere. She was the first woman appointed to the Western House and one of the few women to have a position in any Nigerian House of Chiefs at the time. She also served as a board member for the Nigerian Union of Teachers, which her husband had co-founded.

=== Travel bans and Independence ===
On 6 April 1955, her husband, Israel Ransome-Kuti died from prostate cancer after an extended period of illness. Ransom-Kuti was hit hard by the loss of him, having struggled over the past several years with the question of whether to abandon her political work in order to spend more time with her husband. Over the next two decades, alongside her political work, Ransome-Kuti began investing time and money to establish new schools throughout Abeokuta – a project that arose from the deep belief in the importance of education and literacy that both she and her husband had shared.

Ransome-Kuti continued to travel widely. On the African continent, she developed strong ties with Algerian, Egyptian, and Ghanaian women's organizations, and her visits further abroad included trips to England, China, the Soviet Union, Switzerland, Austria, Czechoslovakia, and Poland.

On a visit to China in 1956, Ransome-Kuti gave public lectures on Nigerian women and culture and met Mao Zedong. Ransome-Kuti believed in a number of socialist ideals, defining herself as an "African Socialist"; although she did not consider herself a communist, she was "not frightened or repelled by communism either". Because she had visited China with the financial assistance of the Women's International Democratic Federation (WIDF), however, Ransome-Kuti attracted the attention of British authorities who feared the WIDF had recruited her to spread communist ideologies. Her passport renewal was denied the following year. In 1958, when Ransome-Kuti was invited to attend a women's rights conference in the United States, she was denied an American visa because authorities felt "she had too many Communist connections". Although Ransome-Kuti received support from high-profile friends and wrote letters of protest to government officials, even holding a press conference to declare that she was not a communist, her protests were ignored. It was not until Nigeria became independent in 1960 that Ransome-Kuti's passport was renewed.

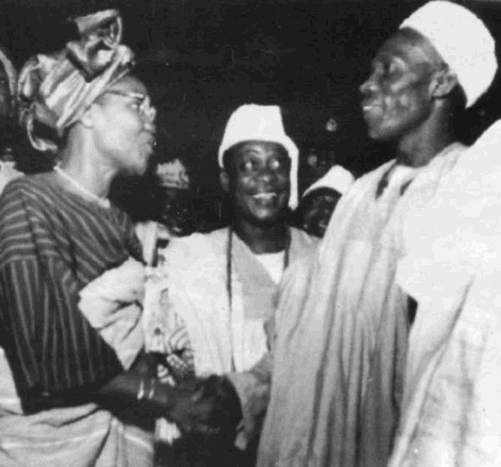
Ransome-Kuti (left) greeting Abubakar Tafawa Balewa, first Prime Minister of Nigeria

In 1959, when Ransome-Kuti was denied a second chance to run as an NCNC candidate, she ran as an independent candidate instead, but her campaign split the vote and helped an opponent of the NCNC win the seat. Afterwards, the party revoked Ransome-Kuti's membership. She went on to found a political party, the Commoners' People's Party, but the party failed to gain momentum, dissolving after only a year. Around this time, Ransome-Kuti's political rivals created the National Council of Women's Societies in an attempt to replace the FNWS.

After independence in 1960, Nigeria introduced universal adult suffrage for both men and women through its new constitution. The Northern Region of Nigeria, which was a primarily Muslim region, did not immediately implement voting rights for women (although women's suffrage in the region was later granted by military decree in 1976).

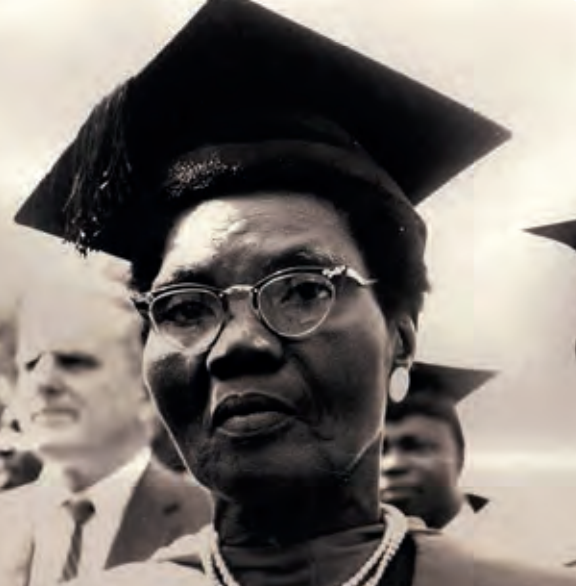
Funmilayo Ransome-Kuti

Nigeria's early years of independence became mired in political disagreements between leaders and representatives. When a 1966 military coup brought a change of power, Ransome-Kuti felt that this was a positive and necessary step forward for the country, but she condemned the violence that followed after the counter-coup that same year. She was actively involved with the Women's International League for Peace and Freedom (WILPF), being president for the organization's Nigerian branch since 1963.

Following Nigeria's independence, Ransome-Kuti continued traveling throughout Nigeria to support women's organizations and Pan-Africanist causes. After the Sharpeville massacre in South Africa in 1960, she publicly denounced the killings and offered her support to the African National Congress, which had been outlawed by the Apartheid government. She would also go on to serve as an informal advisor to Kwame Nkrumah, Ghana's first prime minister. Nkrumah cited Ransome-Kuti's grassroots organizing model as being a helpful reference for developing the Ghana Women's Association.

In 1965, Ransome-Kuti received the national honor of membership in the Order of the Niger. The University of Ibadan bestowed an honorary doctorate of laws upon her in 1968, and she received the Lenin Peace Prize in 1970.

In 1969, Ransome-Kuti was appointed chairman of the Advisory Board of Education by the western Nigeria state government, and she served as a consultant to the Federal Ministry of Education on recruitment of teachers from other countries.

Inspired by her son Fela, who had altered his surname to reflect a discarding of colonial European influences, Ransome-Kuti informally changed her surname to "Anikulapo-Kuti" during the early 1970s. The name "Anikulapo" is a Yoruba word and can be translated to mean "hunter who carries death in a pouch" or "warrior who carries strong protection".

== Death ==
In the later years of Anikulapo-Kuti's life, her son Fela, a musician and activist, became known for his vocal criticisms of Nigerian military governments. Fela had been arrested and briefly imprisoned during the early 1970s, and authorities had raided his home and properties several times. To show his disdain for the Federation of Nigeria's authority, he named his home property "the Kalakuta Republic" and transformed it into a commune where friends and supporters could gather and spend time without fear of the military authorities. In November 1974, Nigerian police raided his nightclub in town with axes and tear gas, leaving Fela with injuries. In 1976, Fela released an album called Zombie, in which he compared the army to mindless machines, and many believe that this album acted as a final straw in the conflict between Fela and the government.

Anikulapo-Kuti often visited her son at his compound, and she was there on 18 February 1977 when close to 1,000 armed soldiers surrounded and stormed the property. As soon as the soldiers broke inside they began destroying property and assaulting the residents. Fela and Bekolari were beaten and severely injured. Anikulapo-Kuti was thrown from a second-floor window. Following the attack, she was hospitalized and eventually lapsed into a coma. She died on 13 April 1978 as a result of her injuries.

Anikulapo-Kuti's remains were interred in Abeokuta in the same vault as her husband. Her funeral services were attended by thousands, and many market women and traders shut down shops and markets across the city to mark her death. Major Nigerian news outlets published eulogies, naming the activist "a progressive revolutionary" and "a Pan-African visionary".

On the one-year anniversary of Anikulapo-Kuti's death, Fela took a coffin and travelled nearly 20 kilometers to Dodan Barracks in Lagos (then Nigeria's Supreme Military Headquarters), leaving the coffin at the gate in an attempt to shame the government. The invasion, her death, and the movement of the coffin is detailed in his song "Coffin for Head of State".

== Ideological framework and political thought ==
Ransome-Kuti described herself as an African socialist, which she defined through her belief that all people, regardless of gender or class, were entitled to freedom, education, healthcare, and housing, and that these rights cannot be secured under colonial rule. She noted that she was "not frightened, or repelled by communism", though she also emphasized that her ideological framework was distinct from Soviet-aligned ideology. Ransome-Kuti's framework was rooted in grassroots organizing, cross-class solidarity, and traditional African values of communalism. Scholars like Adam Mayer place Ransome-Kuti as being a central figure in the development of Nigerian radical political philosophy, as her anti-imperialist framework was a precursor for leftist ideologies that developed in later decades.

Ransome-Kuti's feminism was also tied to her anti-colonialist views. Throughout her actions and writings, she made the argument that it was colonialism, not African tradition, that had subjugated African women. This argument challenges Western feminist theory and links Ransome-Kuti to a broader tradition of women from sub-Saharan Africa whose politics link women's liberation to national liberation.

Scholars of African feminist thought frequently regard Ransome-Kuti as being a practitioner of theoretical frameworks that were not formalized until after her career. For example, Chikwenye Okonjo Ogunyemi's article "Womanism: The Dynamics of the Contemporary Black Female Novel in English" first theorized African womanism in 1985, however Ransome-Kuti's legacy reflects the same tenets that prioritize collective empowerment over individual liberation. In a similar vein, Catherine Obianju' Acholonu's 1995 text Motherism: The Afrocentric Alternative to Feminism formalized a framework that centered African women's political power within their roles as community nurturers; Ransome-Kuti embodied this through her advocacy and argument that market women, and others doing essential community labor, should have political representation. Her argument was predicated both on the grounds of feminism and on motherism.

== Legacy ==
Biographer Cheryl Johnson-Odim notes that Funmilayo Ransome-Kuti's name remains well known throughout Nigeria and that "no other Nigerian woman of her time ranked as such a national figure or had [such] international exposure and connections". Nigerian activist Hajiya Gambo and politician Margaret Ekpo both named Ransome-Kuti as a strong influence on their work, and Nigerian-British feminist writer Amina Mama has cited Ransome-Kuti's activism as having shaped her personal beliefs and perspectives. As noted above, Ghanaian politician Kwame Nkrumah (later the first Prime Minister of Ghana) was heavily inspired by Ransome-Kuti in his early organizing of the Ghana Women's Association.

In 2012, the Central Bank of Nigeria proposed the inclusion of Ransome-Kuti's image on the new N5000 currency note. In August of that year, Ransome-Kuti's grandson, musician Seun Kuti, stated to media that he found the proposal "ludicrous to say the least", in light of the government's role in his grandmother's death. Kuti said that his family had never received an apology for the assault on their compound, with official government statements declaring that Ransome-Kuti had been attacked by "1000 unknown soldiers".

Ransome-Kuti was portrayed in the 2014 film October 1 by actress Deola Sagoe. On 25 October 2019, Ransome-Kuti was posthumously honored with a Google Doodle created by Nigerian-Italian illustrator Diana Ejaita.

In 2022, Bolanle Austen-Peters directed a biopic, Funmilayo Ransome-Kuti, which tells the story of Funmilayo; from her pioneering days as the first female student at Abeokuta Grammar School to her marriage to Israel Ransome-Kuti. The movie won the Best Overall Feature Film and Best Screenplay awards at the 2023 Africa International Film Festival. It features movie stars like Joke Silva, Kehinde Bankole, Ibrahim Suleiman, Jide Kosoko, and Dele Odule.

On 17 May 2024, Tunde Babalola wrote a play that was also called Funmilayo Ransome -Kuti. Much like the 2022 film, it depicts Funmilayo Ransome Kuti's life, beginning with her years as a student at Abeokuta Grammar School and continuing through her marriage to Israel Ransome-Kuti. Together, they confronted injustice by establishing the Abeokuta Women's Union, which led to a violent conflict with traditional and colonial leaders opposed to their pursuit of justice and equality.

In 2025, filmmaker Kahlil Joseph premiered BLKNWS: Terms & Conditions, an experimental film which premiered at the Sundance Film Festival. The film had a theatrical release in November 2025 and features a central character named Funmi, who is a sociologist and historian, and explicitly named after Funmilayo Anikulapo-Kuti. Her inclusion in this film is the result of Joseph's discovery that Ransome-Kuti's name was not included in his family's copy of W.E.B. Du Bois' Africana Encyclopedia. Her absence from that text is engaged in the film as part of a larger question of what and who has been erased from the archive of Black history, and Joseph's belief that absence is not an accident, but rather an intentional political condition.

== See also ==
- List of suffragists and suffragettes
