= Campaign for Democracy =

The Campaign for Democracy (CD) is a Nigerian civil society group that advocates for greater democracy in Nigeria. The group was first organized in the early 1990s to demand an end to the country's military dictatorship. The coalition organized demonstrations, strikes, and other civil resistance actions against the regime of Nigerian Military president Ibrahim Babangida from 1991–1993, particularly against the nullification of the 1993 Nigerian presidential election. At its peak, the coalition had more than 40 affiliated groups.

== Context ==
The Nigerian Second Republic was overthrown in a military coup led by General Muhammadu Buhari, which established a military dictatorship under the control of the Supreme Military Council. Buhari was subsequently overthrown by Ibrahim Babangida. Babangida followed several policies to loosen political control, including easing restrictions on freedom of expression. He also promised to return the country to civilian rule by 1990. However, Babangida repeatedly delayed liberalization measures, and civil society leaders did not have faith that he would genuinely give up power. One attempt to return the country to democracy through a national conference was repressed by the government in September 1990, leading several civil society leaders to the conclusion that forming an organized pressure group to push for democratization was crucial.

== Founding ==
The Campaign for Democracy was founded in November 1991 at a conference in Jos held by the National Consultative Forum, and six other human rights groups, women's groups, and labor organizations. Their primary goal at the founding was to advocate for a return to civilian rule through the holding of a sovereign national conference. The group's first chairman was doctor and activist Beko Ransome-Kuti, who was frequently arrested for his work with the group.

== 1993 presidential election ==
As part of Babangida's controlled return to democracy, two legal political parties were allowed to compete in a presidential election in June 1993. Businessman Moshood Abiola won the election, but Babangida annulled the results. Under pressure from the Campaign for Democracy and an alliance of other civil society groups, Babangida was forced to resign and ceded power to a transitional government led by Ernest Shonekan. Shonekan was tasked with holding a new presidential election in 1994, but was prevented by the November 1993 coup led by Sani Abacha.

== Fragmentation and later years ==
The Campaign for Democracy broke into two groups in late 1994, with a significant portion of the group's executive council accusing Chairman Ransome-Kuti of colluding with the Abacha regime. The faction that supported Chairman Ransome-Kuti remained as the Campaign for Democracy, while the breakaway faction formed the Democratic Alternative, a competing coalition.

The Campaign for Democracy remained as a pressure group for greater democracy in Nigeria throughout the Abacha regime and after the transition to civilian rule. After the 2019 Nigerian general election the CD accused the government of President Muhammadu Buhari of stealing the election and demanded his resignation.
