= Beko Ransome-Kuti =

Nigerian doctor and activist (1940–2006)

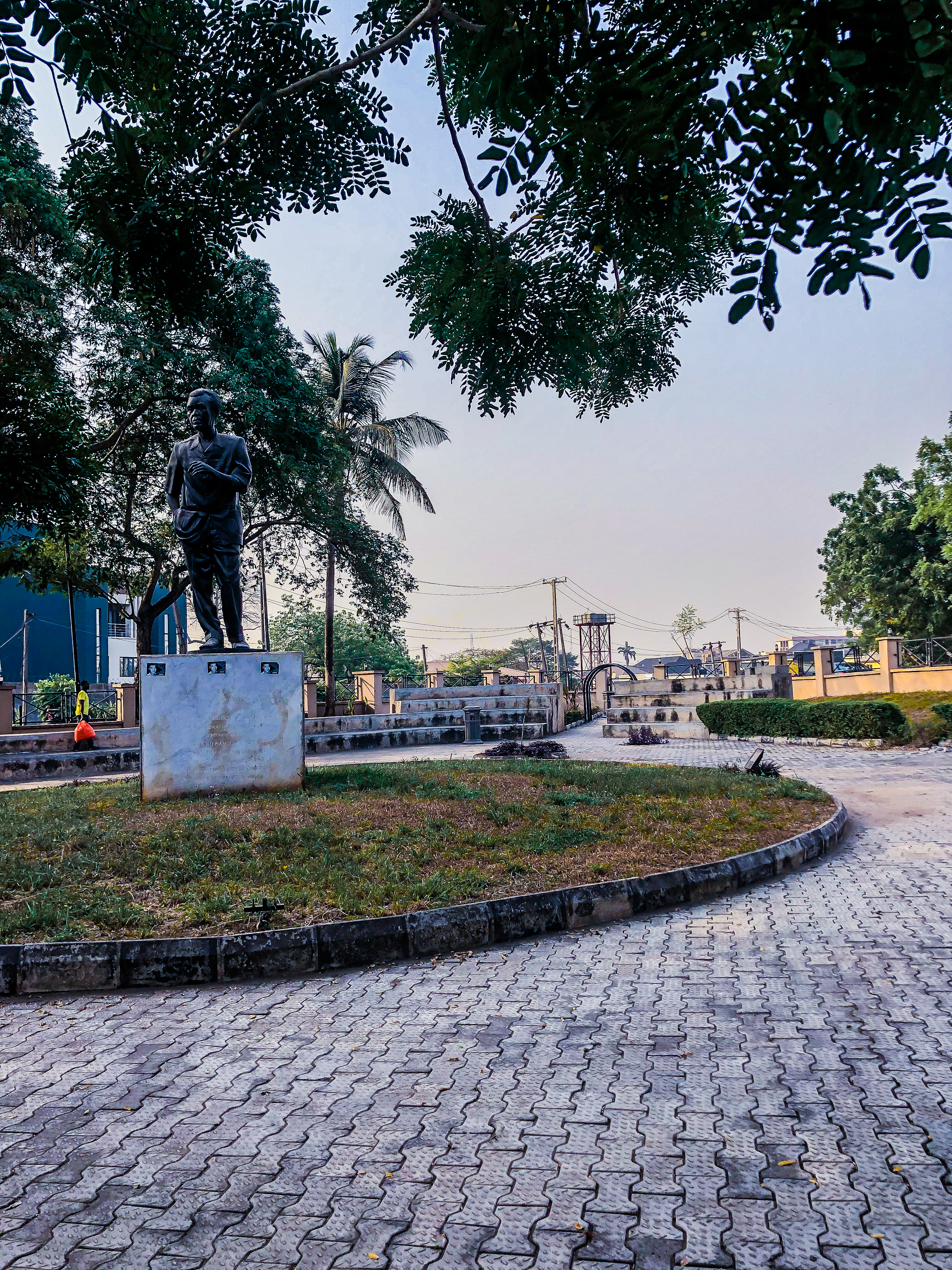
- Born: 2 August 1940; Abeokuta, British Nigeria
- Died: 10 February 2006 (aged 65); Lagos University Teaching Hospital, Idi-Araba, Lagos, Nigeria
- Occupations: Physician, Human rights activist

Dr. Bekolari Ransome-Kuti (2 August 1940 – 10 February 2006) was a Nigerian physician known for his work as a human rights activist.

== Early life ==
Ransome-Kuti was born in Abeokuta, Nigeria. His mother Funmilayo Ransome-Kuti opposed indiscriminate taxation of women by the British colonial government. She helped negotiate Nigerian independence from Britain and is said to have been the first Nigerian woman to drive a car. His father Oludotun Ransome-Kuti was an Anglican priest and co-founder of the Nigeria Union of Teachers. One of his brothers, Fela Kuti, was a musician and activist who founded Afrobeat; another, Olikoye Ransome-Kuti, was also a physician and an AIDS campaigner. Beko's son, Enitan, served in the Nigerian Army and was once the Commander of the Multinational Joint Task Force.

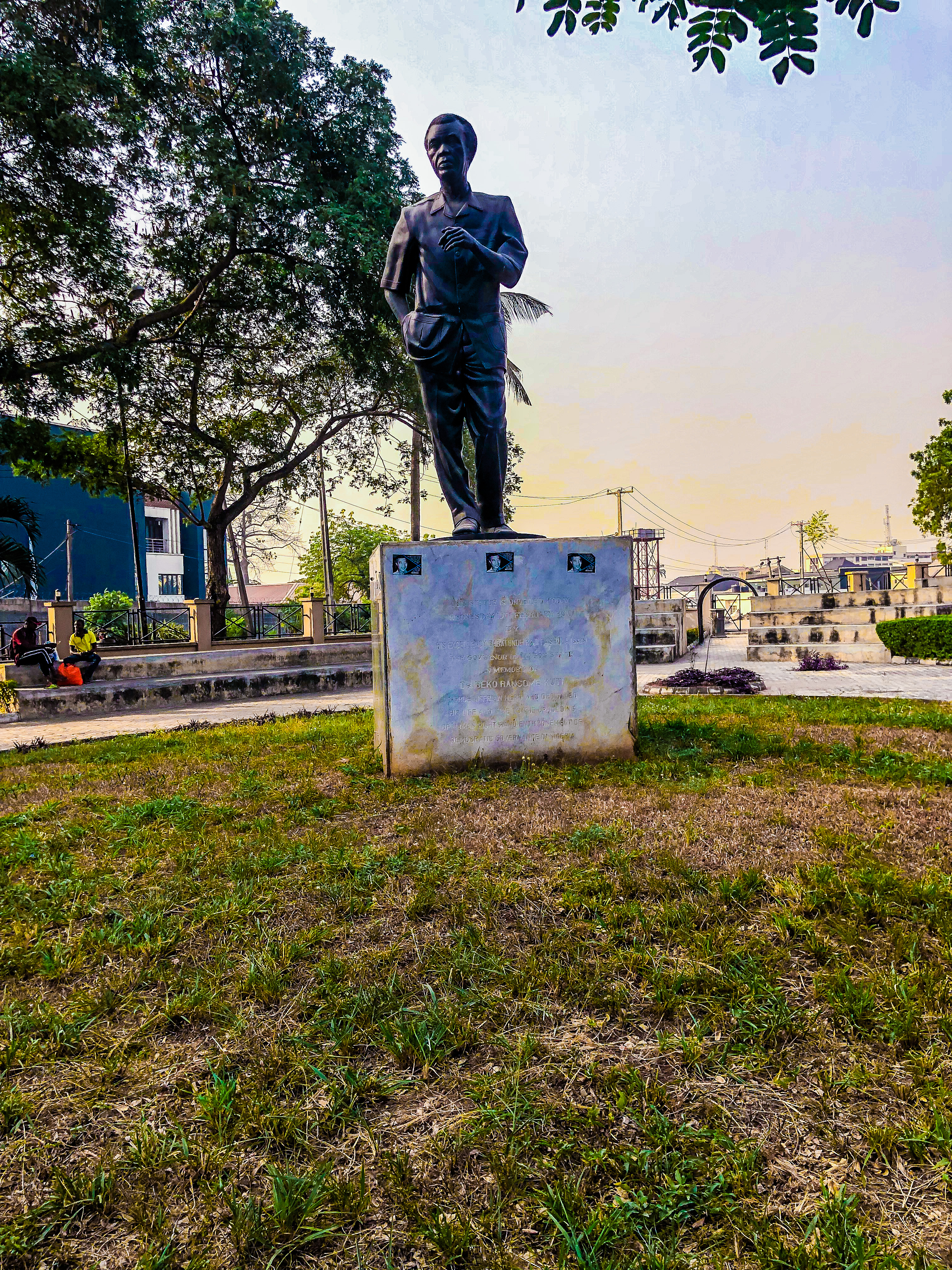
Image of Beko Ransome-Kuti park

Ransome-Kuti attended Abeokuta Grammar School, Coventry Technical College, and Manchester University, where he became a physician.

== Career and activism ==
Ransome-Kuti returned to Nigeria in 1963 upon obtaining his degree. He was deeply affected by the events of 1977, when soldiers under the orders of T. Y. Danjuma, then Chief of Army staff, stormed his brother Fela Kuti's nightclub, destroyed his medical clinic and killed his mother. He became chairman of the Lagos branch of the Nigerian Medical Association and its national deputy, campaigning against the lack of drugs in hospitals.

In 1984, Fela was arrested and sentenced to 10 years in prison by the government of General Muhammadu Buhari. Ransome-Kuti was also jailed, and his medical association was banned. He was released in 1985 when Buhari was deposed by General Ibrahim Babangida; Babangida then invited him to participate in the government.

Ransome-Kuti helped to form Nigeria's first human rights organisation, the Campaign for Democracy, which in 1993 opposed the dictatorship of General Sani Abacha. In 1995, a military tribunal sentenced him to life in prison for bringing the mock trial of Olusegun Obasanjo to the attention of the world. He was adopted as a prisoner of conscience by Amnesty International and freed in 1998 following the death of Sani Abacha.

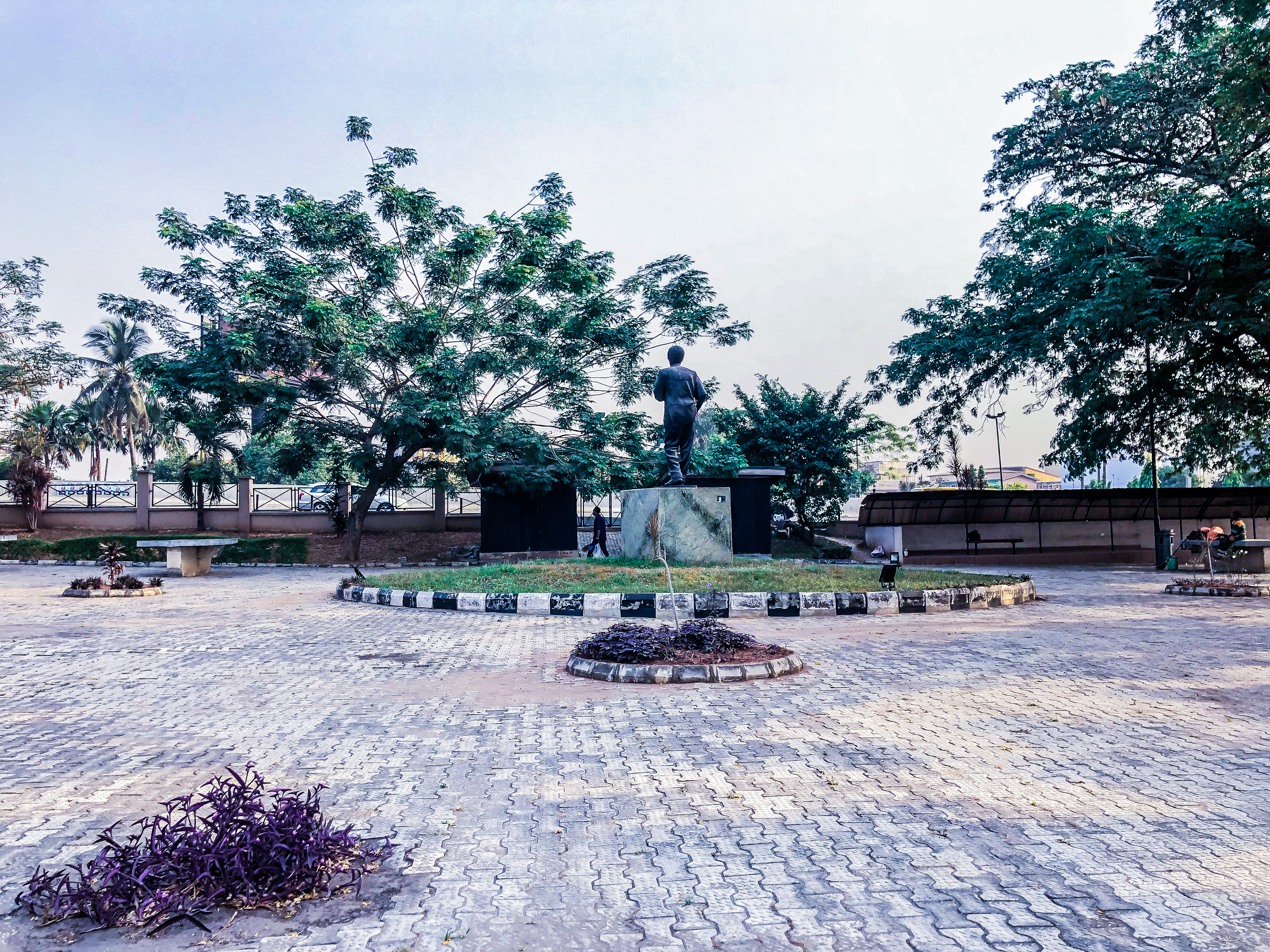
Beko Ransome-Kuti park

Ransome-Kuti was a fellow of the West African College of Physicians and Surgeons, a leading figure in the British Commonwealth's human rights committee, chair of the Committee for the Defense of Human Rights and executive director of the Centre for Constitutional Governance.

== Death and legacy ==
Ransome-Kuti died from complications of lung cancer on 10 February 2006, aged 65, at approximately 11:20 p.m. at the Lagos University Teaching Hospital, Idi-Araba, Lagos, Nigeria. The state government honoured him with a statue in 2010 and a park, the Beko Ransome-Kuti Park, was named in his honour.
