= Sowande =

Sowande is a name of Yoruba origin. Notable people with the surname include:

- Fela Sowande (1905-1987), Nigerian musician and composer
- Tunji Sowande (1912-1996), Nigeria-born United Kingdom lawyer and musician
- Bode Sowande (born 1948), Nigerian writer and dramatist
