= The Anglo-African (Lagos) =

Nigerian English-language newspaper (1863–1865)

- Founder: Robert Campbell

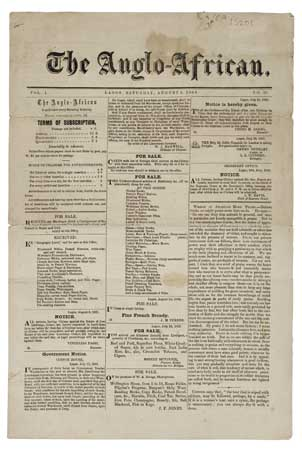
Issue 10 of The Anglo-African from 8 August 1863

The Anglo-African was a newspaper published in the British Colony of Lagos between 1863 and 1865. It was founded by Jamaican-born American emigrant Robert Campbell using a printing press he had brought from the United States as part of a plan to set up a settlement for black emigrants. The newspaper was opposed by the British governor, Henry Stanhope Freeman, who attempted to impose a tax upon it.

== History ==
The newspaper was founded by Jamaican-born American emigrant Robert Campbell. He had arrived in Lagos with his family in 1862 intending to establish a settlement at Abeokuta for black emigrants from the United States. With little interest during the American Civil War and with local opposition Campbell gave up his plans and settled in Lagos. He decided to establish a newspaper using a printing press he had brought for the colony. The Anglo-African was the first newspaper to be published in Lagos. The first edition appeared on 6 June 1863, and the paper was published weekly until December 1865. The title reflected Campbell's ethos that the development of Africa must be preceded by the spread of English civilization. The paper found a reasonably large audience in Lagos, particularly among emigrants from the Colony of Sierra Leone. It consisted of four pages of local and international news, short stories, poems, serialized novels and advertisements.

The Anglo-African was opposed by the British authorities in Lagos who feared it would cause ill-feeling between different factions in the colony. The governor of Lagos, Henry Stanhope Freeman, wrote to the Colonial Secretary, Henry Pelham-Clinton, 5th Duke of Newcastle, to propose that a punitive tax be introduced on newspapers to hinder its distribution. Freeman cited the effects of local newspapers in Sierra Leone: "Your Grace must be perfectly aware of the unfortunate disputes and ill feeling which the worse than worthless periodicals published at the other Colonies on the Coast have caused: and of the injury done by the foolish and ill-judged articles inserted in a little paper printed by the Missionaries at Abeokuta". Freeman suggested that a single government-controlled newspaper, exempt from the tax, might be established. Newcastle rejected this proposal, noting that a similar scheme in Sierra Leone, in which The New Era had been brought under government control, had led to ill feeling.

Freeman tried to exert some control over The Anglo-African by taking out extensive advertisements within it. In response to complaints that this undermined its independence Campbell wrote that such advertisements would not affect his opinions on matters in the colony.
