= Herbert Tugwell =

Anglican bishop in Nigeria (1854–1936)

Herbert Tugwell (15 March 1854 – 22 July 1936) was a colonial Anglican bishop in the late 19th and early 20th centuries. ordained a priest the following year;

Tugwell was born in Salisbury, Wiltshire, United Kingdom, educated at Corpus Christi College, Cambridge and ordained in 1881. He was Curate of St Mary, Petworth and then a Church Mission Society (CMS) missionary in Lagos.

In 1894 he was appointed to the episcopate as Bishop of Western Equatorial Africa. The CMS decided to create two assistant bishops to help with the workload of the large diocese and to assuage African opinion. James Johnson, although the most prominent clergyman in the colony, was considered unsafe. Instead the more conservative Charles Phillips of Ondo was appointed, along with Isaac Oluwole, a former principal of the CMS Grammar School, Lagos. When the Western Equatorial Africa diocese was split in 1919, Tugwell became the inaugural Bishop on the Niger.

He returned to England in 1921 and served as Rector of Mavesyn Ridware, Staffordshire from 1921 to 1927.

He died on 22 July 1936. He had married Caroline White and had a son and a daughter; he had become a Doctor of Divinity (DD).

In 1939, a church in the Anglican Diocese of Lagos was named after him. The church, Bishop Tugwell Memorial Anglican Church (BTM for short), is reputed to be the oldest Igbo Anglican church in the whole of Lagos. BTM Anglican Church marked its 75th anniversary with a church service on 19 October 2014.

== Archives ==
A collection of archival material related to Herbert Tugwell can be found at the Cadbury Research Library, University of Birmingham.
