= Robert Campbell (colonist) =

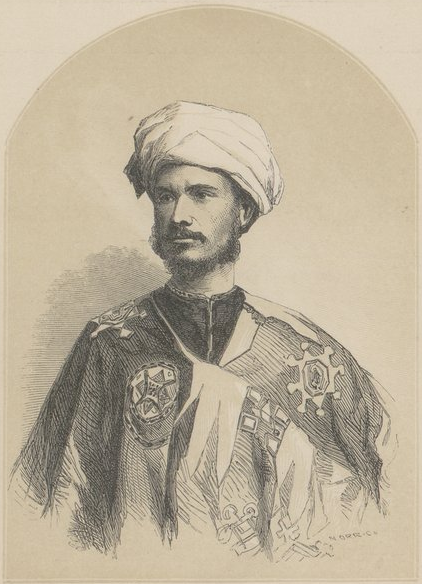
- Portrait from Campbell's 1861 book
- Born: 7 May 1829; Kingston, Colony of Jamaica
- Died: 19 January 1884 (aged 54); Lagos Colony
- Occupations: Printer; educator
- Known for: Attempting to establish a colony of black Americans in Abeokuta, Nigeria

Signature
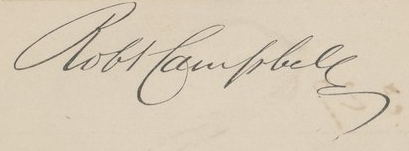

Robert Campbell (7 May 1829 – 19 January 1884) was a Jamaican-born emigrant from the United States to Lagos Colony who wrote books and published a newspaper. Initially apprenticed to a printer he trained as a teacher in Spanish Town. Finding his salary insufficient in the economic turmoil of post-abolition Jamaica he emigrated to Nicaragua and Panama before settling in New York City in 1853. He found work as a printer before being employed as a science teacher and then assistant principal at the Institute for Colored Youth in Philadelphia, Pennsylvania.

In 1858 Campbell joined Martin R. Delany on the Niger Valley Exploring Party to look for a suitable site for the settlement of black Americans in West Africa. A site at Abeokuta (in modern-day Nigeria) was selected and the expedition returned to the United States. Campbell returned to Africa in 1862, but found that, due to the American Civil War as well as opposition from the leaders of the British Colony of Lagos and disputes between the Egba people and the British, his settlement plans had been rendered untenable. Campbell instead settled in Lagos, establishing the Anglo-African newspaper. This was opposed by the British governor, Henry Stanhope Freeman, who thought it would lead to ill feeling between different factions in the colony. The newspaper ceased in 1865 and Campbell afterwards worked to develop the colony commercially.

== Early life and career ==
Robert Campbell was born on 7 May 1829, in Kingston, Jamaica. He was described as being a "mulatto", the son of a white Scottish father and a mixed race mother. The years after Campbell's birth were turbulent in Jamaica, with economic impacts from the 1833 abolition of slavery and periodic cholera epidemics. Campbell found a position as an apprentice at a printing shop before training as a teacher at the newly established Normal School at Spanish Town.

Campbell afterwards worked as a parish schoolmaster in Kingston. A low salary and worsening economic condition caused him to seek work abroad. He took his family to Central America, working in Nicaragua and Panama in 1852. Finding conditions there little better than in Jamaica he moved to New York City in 1853. Campbell described finding racist attitudes in New York worse than those he had experienced elsewhere. The only work he could find was as in a printing shop run by Englishman John Grey, an associate of the abolitionist Lewis Tappan. From 1855 he became a science teacher and then assistant principal at the Institute for Colored Youth in Philadelphia.

== West African colony plan ==
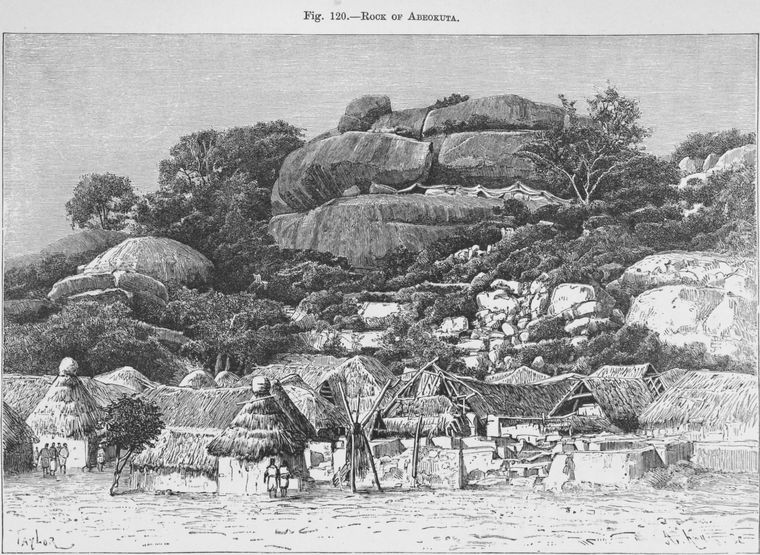
An 1892 depiction of part of Abeokuta

In 1858 Campbell was invited by Martin R. Delany to join the Niger Valley Exploring Party, an expedition to inspect land around Abeokuta (in modern-day Nigeria) for potential settlement by black Americans disenchanted with the level of racism in the United States. Campbell had been recommended to Delany by the artist Robert Douglass Jr. Campbell and the expedition travelled the region in 1859–60, signing a treaty with local chiefs to secure land for a settlement. He returned to the United States in 1860. He wrote A Few Facts Relating to Lagos, Abeokuta and Other Sections of Central Africa, which was published in Philadelphia in 1861, and A Pilgrimage to the Motherland: An Account of a Journey Among the Egbas and Yorubas of Central Africa, in 1859–60, published in New York in 1861 (this work was reprinted in 1971). In his writings Campbell wrote that his prospective emigrants were "willing to seek a home in the land of their forefathers where unimpeded by unjust restrictions they might find the means not only of developing their mental and moral faculties, but promote legitimate commerce and the production of those staples, particularly cotton, which are now supplied to the world chiefly by slave labour" with a hope of undermining slavery and the slave trade. He also hoped that the emigrants would act as missionaries to Africa, bringing a "black nationality" to the traditionally European missionary work.

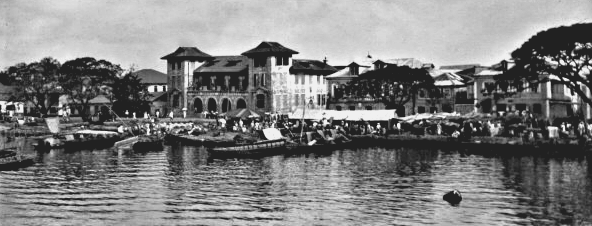
Lagos in the 19th century

Campbell planned to return to Nigeria and spent two years in the United States preparing. He purchased a British-made cotton gin, a printing press and other machinery for his colony. He returned to Nigeria with his wife and four children in March 1862, arriving at Lagos, which had since become a British colony. Campbell found that the outbreak of the American Civil War led to a loss of interest in foreign settlement by black Americans and was opposed by the British missionaries already present at Abeokuta and by Sir Richard Burton the explorer and British diplomat. Poor relations between the British and the Egba people, resulting from the establishment of the Lagos colony and worsened by the British attempt to establish a consul in Abeokuta in May 1862, also hindered Campbell. After May 1862 Campbell abandoned his plans to establish a colony and settled instead in Lagos.

== Anglo-African ==
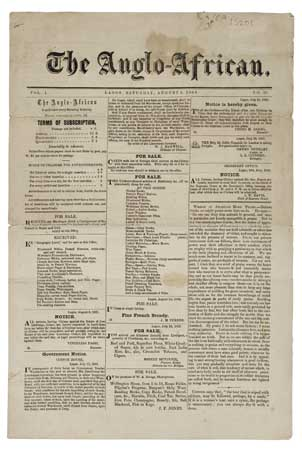
Issue 10 of the Anglo-African from 8 August 1863

Campbell found soon after his arrival that he was unable to make use of his cotton gin but determined to start a newspaper. He established The Anglo-African as the first newspaper to be published in Lagos. The first edition appeared on 6 June 1863, and the paper was published weekly until December 1865. The paper was reasonably successful but opposed by the British governor Henry Stanhope Freeman who attempted, unsuccessfully, to impose a tax upon it.

== Later activities ==
Campbell was active in the literary and scientific society of Lagos and from 1865 became involved in a number of businesses. He hoped to promote commercial development in Lagos but was hindered by continuous war between the tribes of the inland regions which led to blockages in trade along the rivers. Campbell was one of a number of Lagos residents who petitioned the Colonial Office to install a strong governor to exert control over the interior, suggesting Captain John Hawley Glover. Campbell died in Lagos on 19 January 1884.
