= Charles Joseph George =

- Born: Lagos, Nigeria
- Died: 1906
- Occupation: Trader
- Known for: Political activity

Charles Joseph George (before 1881 – 1906) was a successful Saro (Note: A "Saro" was a freed Sierra Leonean slave, of Nigerian origin, who had returned to Nigeria.) trader who was appointed a member of the Legislative Council of the Lagos Colony from 1886 onwards.

== Church leader ==
Charles Joseph George was born in Lagos, Nigeria. He was of Egba origin, a Lagos trader and a prominent Wesleyan. The Anglican C.M.S. Grammar School, Lagos had been established in 1859 by Rev. T.B. Macaulay. On 13 January 1874, leaders of the Methodist community, including C.J. George, met to discuss founding a similar school for members of their communion. After a fund-raising drive, the Methodist Boys' School building was opened in June 1877. On 17 February 1881, George was one of the community leaders who laid the foundation stone for the Wesley Church at Olowogbowo, in the west of Lagos Island.

== Legislative Council member ==
As a leader of the indigenous business community, C.J. George was appointed an unofficial (Note: "Unofficial" means a civilian as opposed to a colonial official.) member of the Legislative Council by Governor Alfred Moloney when Lagos Colony was separated from the Gold Coast in 1886. The new legislative council was composed of four official and three unofficial members. Moloney nominated two Africans as unofficial representatives, the other being James Johnson.

The British had arranged to pay Dosunmu, the Oba of Lagos an annual grant of £1,000 for his lifetime, after which they would assume full sovereignty of the colony. When Dosunmu died in 1884, Africans led by James Johnson and supported by George demanded a reasonable payment for his son, Oyekan. This was agreed by the administration, but only reluctantly. In August 1896, C.J. George and G.W. Neville, both merchants and both unofficial members of the Legislative Council, presented a petition urging construction of the railway terminus on Lagos Island rather than at Iddo, and also asking for the railway to be extended to Abeokuta. George was the leader of the delegation making this request, and described its many commercial advantages.

In 1903 there was a crisis over the payment of the tolls that were collected from traders by native rulers, although Europeans were exempted. The alternative was to replace the tolls by a subsidy. Governor William MacGregor requested views from C.J. George, Christopher Sapara Williams and Obadiah Johnson as indigenous opinion leaders. All were in favor of retaining the tolls to avoid upsetting the rulers. In 1903 the government of the colony prepared a Newspaper Ordinance ostensibly designed to prevent libels being published. George, Williams and Johnson, the three Nigerian council members, all objected on the grounds that the ordinance would inhibit freedom of the press. George said "any obstacle in the way of publication of newspapers in this colony means throwing Lagos back to its position forty or fifty years ago". Despite these objections, the ordinance was passed into law.

George was reappointed to the Legislative Council in April 1904. He retained his position on the Council until his death in 1906.
