= Rita Lawrence =

British pianist and singer (1911–2001)

- fair use image by Val Wilmer 1990
- Born: Rita Cann; 24 January 1911; Purley
- Died: 4 May 2001 (aged 90); Cardiff
- Occupations: musician and singer

Rita Cann professionally known as Rita Lawrence (24 January 1911 – 4 May 2001) was a British Black pianist and singer.

== Life ==
Lawrence was born on 24 January 1911 at Purley, Croydon to Albert Sam Cann, a Fanti merchant, and his White English wife Emma Elizabeth, née Dowsett. Her father organised appearances at Wigmore Hall of performers including Dorothy Callender and Paul Robeson. She grew up in Beddington and Streatham, Austria and Germany, where her father was arrested for fraud. It is said that Lawrence argued her own way into a judge's chambers at the age of fourteen to plead her father's case. His maternal grandmother had encouraged her daughter to marry Albert because she valued interracial marriages.

Her grandmother was involved with a group in Dulwich who offered help to Africans with accommodation. Lawrence's father dealt in tobacco, cocoa and mahogany and while visiting Britain he found the Dulwich group and his future wife.

She moved to London in 1934 and during the war she would play at bottle parties in Soho bars. She would have like to have been a concert pianist but she obtained work as a singer or a pianist where she was an unusual black performer. She danced with Adelaide Hall and Fats Waller. Her name was changed at the suggestion of Fela Sowande who included her in his Jubilee Singers. She then sang with Rudolph Dunbar's dance band and met Ivy Benson. She met the Cuban Don Marino Barreto (1907–1995) and he encouraged her career. He persuaded her that she should train again at the Guildhall School of Music and in return he would teach her Latin-American rhythm. She played piano in his band and they became a couple.

In 1946 she formed her own Havana Sextet which for a time included the trumpeter Eddie Calvert. They were resident at a London's Thameside Bray Hotel with music arranged by her brother Lawrence. She appeared on British television in Fela Sowande's choir in a programme called "Club Ebony". Another of Fela's brothers, Tunji Sowande, was a barrister but he was also a baritone and they appeared together with Rita supplying a chic presentation and her piano accompaniment to Sowande's singing.

Rita gave up being a professional musician and became a telephonist at the British Museum. In her spare time she continued to perform in charity performances. She continued her friendship with Marino Barreto and they lived together for a few years in Sweden.

She died in May 2001 in Cardiff.
