= Governor Freeman =

Governor Freeman may refer to:

- Henry Stanhope Freeman (1831–1865), 1st Governor of the Lagos Colony from 1862 to 1865
- John Freeman (diplomat) (born 1951), Governor of the Turks and Caicos Islands from 2016 to 2019
