= Henry Johnson (priest) =

Niger Priest

Henry Johnson Jr. was a Saro archdeacon of The Upper Niger from 1878 to 1891.

Johnson was born in October 1840 (or November 10, 1840) in Hastings, Sierra Leone as the first child of Henry Erugujinmi Johnson Sr. (1810-11/2/1865) and Sarah Johnson (died 23/6/1876). Johnson's parents had been captured as slaves but were liberated in Freetown and resettled in the village of Hastings. He was baptized on January 24, 1841. He had six younger siblings, Nathaniel Johnson (1844-1921), Samuel Johnson, Obadiah Johnson, Adolphus Stephen Johnson, Mrs. Margaret Sarah Brown (later Cole) (d. 1920), and Mrs. Rosaline Dorothy Allen (nee Johnson). Their father was from the Gbagere compound in the defunct Oyo metropolis of what is today Nigeria. Through his father, he claimed to be a great-grandson of Alaafin Abiodun of the Oyo Empire, and thus was an Omoba of the Oyo people.

He joined his parents in their mission to Ibadan on February 11, 1858. He then trained for Anglican priesthood at Church Missionary Society College, Islington. He was ordained deacon at St. George's Cathedral, Sierra Leone in 1866, and priest in 1867. Johnson served at Fourah Bay, Sherbro, and Lokoja. He was awarded an honorary M.A. of Cambridge University in 1886.

Johnson died in 1901.
