= Tunji Sowande =

Nigerian-born lawyer and musician (1912–1996)

- Born: 1912; Lagos, Nigeria
- Died: 1996 (aged 83–84)
- Education: King's College London; Lincoln's Inn
- Occupations: Lawyer and musician
- Relatives: Fela Sowande (brother)

Tunji Sowande (1912 – 1996) was a Nigerian-born British lawyer and musician.

== Early life ==
Tunji Sowande was born in Lagos, Nigeria, in 1912 to a well-off and musical family. His brother was Fela Sowande. His father was the Anglican priest, Emmanuel Sowande, a pioneer of church music in Lagos and a contemporary of the classical composer and organist Ekundayo Phillips.

Sowande was educated at the CMS Anglican Grammar School in Lagos and the Yaba Higher College, where he obtained a diploma in pharmacy in about 1940. He worked with the public health department in Lagos as a dispensing pharmacist for a number of years. His contemporary was the late Adeyinka Oyekan, who was to become the Oba (king) of Lagos. He is said to have set up a private Pharmacy business alongside Oyekan.

Sowande was a baritone singer, organist, and later a jazz drummer and saxophonist. He played in the conservative surroundings of the Anglican Cathedral in Lagos in his spare time.

He married in 1938 and had two children, Ayo and Tunde, who joined him in the UK, where they were educated, before returning to Nigeria as adults.

== Education in the UK ==
In 1945, Sowande decided to travel to the United Kingdom to pursue a career in Law, though his personal account was more to the effect that he wanted a change of scene to pursue his musical skills, with legal studies being an adjunct to his genuine quest.

He studied law at King's College London, and took and passed the Bar Finals at Lincoln's Inn.

Sowande occupied himself primarily playing around the UK, supporting several acts both jazz, classical and horal. He collaborated on live sets with several contemporaries including Johnny Dankworth, Ronnie Scott, Paul Robeson and Afro-Caribbean icons like Ambrose Campbell and Edmundo Ros.

Sowande formed a long-standing partnership with the popular pioneering Black singer and pianist Rita Cann, whom he mentored, and was part of the group of Black intellectuals and musicians who met at the flat of African-American musician John Payne in Regent's Park.

Sowande also recorded at least one single on the Afro-Caribbean Melodisc label, the track being "Ihin Rere" and Igi T'Olorun". He is also reputed to have dedicated a substantial part of his musical career to playing for charity, entertaining an elderly audience, as a duo with Rita Cann, travelling around the UK for this purpose. His other compositions including the song "Ara Eyo".

He was also reputed to have written several short plays.

== Legal career ==
Sowande was called to the Bar in February 1952 and, upon completing his pupillage, was informed by his mentor and Master of Chambers, Jeffrey Howard (later Judge Jeffrey Howard) that he had been offered a full tenancy at the prestigious 3 Kings Bench Walk chambers. This was unexpected. Tenancies in prestigious Chambers were not available to Black barristers due to a colour bar effectively operating. Sowande had aimed to pursue his musical career on completion of his studies and initially refused but subsequently accepted after pressure from his Pupil Master.

Sowande went on to pursue a career at the Bar, specialising in criminal law. His only other Black contemporary at the Bar at the time being the Caribbean barrister Learie Constantine, who was a professional cricketer but practised law and had sued and won compensation from the Imperial Hotel, London in 1944 for having been barred "on the grounds of colour". Constantine later became Trinidadian High Commissioner to London and the UK's first Black peer.

Sowande handled a large number of complex criminal matters in the course of his career. He was often at the Central Criminal Court, Quarter Sessions, Chelmsford, St Albans, Hereford, Middlesex, and others and was on the county prosecutors list in Essex.

He rose to the rank of Head of Chambers at 3 Kings Bench Walk after several years in 1968, making him the first Black Head of a major Barrister's Chambers. In addition in April 1978, he became the first Black Deputy Circuit Judge (assistant Recorder) sitting initially at Snaresbrook and thereafter at 24 of the crown courts, including Croydon, Inner London and Knightsbridge.

In 1986, Sowande was recorded as a Bencher of the Inner Temple. Sowande was appointed a Recorder (Judge) of the Crown Court, from where he retired on or about 1989. This certainly is the authoritative view thus contradicting the Black Lawyers Directory claim that Dr John Roberts was the first Black Judge, since his appointment was only in 1985, whereas Sowande became a Deputy Recorder seven years prior to this. Roberts was most certainly the first Black Queen's Counsel, a rank which Sowande had striven for but did not attain before his death.

Sowande assisted the careers of several lawyers from minority backgrounds, including Kim Hollis QC, who was given her opportunity of Tenancy by Sowande and mentored her in the early stages of her career.

== Personal life and death ==
Socially, Sowande was an active a member of the Hurlingham Club, Justice, Concert Artiste's Association, several Theatrical Societies, lifelong member of Marylebone Cricket Club and Crystal Palace Football Club.

Sowande died in 1996 at the age of 84.

== Commemoration ==
In 2017, a play about Sowande, Just an Ordinary Lawyer, was created by Tayo Aluko.
