= Christopher Oluwole Rotimi =

Nigerian politician (born 1935)

Brigadier general Christopher Oluwole Rotimi

Governor Western State
- In office 1 April 1971 – July 1975
- Preceded by: Robert Adeyinka Adebayo
- Succeeded by: Akin Aduwo

Ambassador of Nigeria to the United States of America
- In office March 2008 – 9 October 2009
- Lieutenant: Null
- Preceded by: George Obiozor
- Succeeded by: Tunde Adeniran

Personal details
- Born: 20 February 1935 (age 91) Abeokuta, Ogun State, Nigeria
- Party: Unknown
- Education: King's College, Lagos; University College Ibadan
- Occupation: Soldier

Military service
- Allegiance: Nigeria
- Branch/service: Nigerian Army
- Rank: Brigadier general

Christopher Oluwole Rotimi (born 20 February 1935) is a retired Nigerian Army brigadier general, diplomat and politician, he served during the Nigerian Civil War, and was the Governor of Western State while Nigeria was under military rule from 1971 to 1975. Oluwole Rotimi became the Nigerian Ambassador to the United States in 2007.

== Early life ==
Oluwole Rotimi was born 20 February 1935, in Abeokuta, Nigeria to a Yoruba family. He attended Agooko Methodist School, Lisabi school, Olowogbowo Methodist School as well as Kings College Lagos, after which he earned a BA at the University College Ibadan.

Oluwole Joined the Nigerian Army in 1960 and served as part of the United Nations Peacekeeping Force in the Democratic Republic of the Congo. He rose to become the first African Deputy Quartermaster General and the third non-white Quartermaster General of the Nigerian Army in 1966. During the Nigerian Civil War Oluwole Rotimi provided logistics support for the Federal Government's war efforts. He became the commander of the Ibadan Garrison between 1969 and 1970.

== Governor of Western State ==
After the war Oluwole Rotimi became the Military Governor of Western State of Nigeria in 1971, under Yakubu Gowon in succession to Brigadier Adeyinka Adebayo. During his time as governor, the state had peace and development.

=== Projects As Governor ===
- The Cement Factory at Shagamu
- The Wire and Cable Factory in Ibadan
- The Ceramic Factory in Abeokuta
- The Wood Processing Factory in Ondo
- The palm oil Mill at Okitipupa.

== 1975 coup ==
In 1975, Oluwole Rotimi was removed from office as governor of Western Nigeria after the 1975 coup d'état. The following administration led by General Murtala Mohammed, commissioned a panel to investigate corruption amongst that past governors of the past administration. Oluwole Rotimi, together with Mobolaji Johnson-Brigadier (Lagos State Governor) was one of the only two governors exonerated.

== Under Obasanjo ==
In 1999 Gen. Oluwole Rotimi was appointed by the President Olusegun Obasanjo as the Head of a Commission of Inquiry for the Investigation of Federal Government Landed Property.

Oluwole Rotimi was honored with a National Award of Commander of the Order of the Niger (CON) in 2003.

In 2005, Oluwole Rotimi was appointed a member of the National Constitutional Review Conference representing his home state-Ogun State.

== Ambassador ==
Oluwole Rotimi became the Ambassador to the United States of America in March 2008. He was sacked from the post in March 2009 by the President of Nigeria, Umaru Yar'Adua after allegations of insubordination.
