= Isaac Oluwole =

Nigerian bishop (1852–1932)

- Born: 1852; Abeokuta, Ogun State, Nigeria
- Died: 1932 (aged 79–80)
- Education: Fourah Bay
- Occupations: Clergy; Educator
- Spouse: Abigail Oluwole
- Children: Abigail Tinuola Philips; Isaac Ladipo Oluwole; Rebecca Ibironke Lucas; Obafunmilayo Manuwa

Isaac Oluwole (1852–1932) was a Nigerian bishop of Sierra Leonean and Egba heritage. He was one of the most prominent emigrants from Sierra Leone resident in Lagos during the second half of the nineteenth century. From 1879 to 1893, he was the Principal of the CMS Grammar School, Lagos and was later ordained a priest. He was believed to be one of the most loved among his clergy peers, which may have led to his recommendation as a bishop after a leading radical candidate, James Johnson, complained about the lack of indigenous control of the Church Missionary Society.

== Life ==
Photograph of Lagos Mission in 1885. Back row: W. Morgan, Chas. Phillips, J. White, Archdeacon Hamilton, Nathaniel Johnson, Isaac Oluwole, R.E. Willoughby Middle row: Rev. V.S. Wright, Mrs. Ingham, Bishop Ingham, Mrs Darwin Fox, Rev. James Johnson, Rev. J.W. Dickinson Front row: Rev. F.W.Dodd, Rev. W. Darwin Fox

Oluwole was born in Abeokuta to a father of Ijebu heritage and mother from Ilesha. His parents were members of the Anglican Church in Abeokuta under Henry Townsend. He lost his father at the age of 13 and at the request of Townsend, he was placed under the care of Dr Harrison, a CMS missionary who was training other children in the region. Oluwole attended the Anglican elementary school in Ake, Abeokuta and continued his education at the Anglican Training Institution also in Abeokuta. When the school was moved to Lagos after protests against missionaries in Abeokuta, Oluwole continued his studies in Lagos. After completing his education, he taught for four years with the Anglican mission.

In 1876, at the request of Rev. J.B. Wood, he was sponsored to attend Fourah Bay College in Sierra Leonne where he ended up earning his bachelor's degree. Along with N.S. Davies and Obadiah Johnson, Oluwole was among the first students to obtain a bachelor's degree from the school in 1879 through the college's affiliation with the University of Durham.

After the death of Rev T. B. Macaulay, a son-in-law of Bishop Ajayi Crowther in 1879, the Church Missionary Society elected Oluwole as the new Principal of the C.M.S. Grammar School, Lagos. Before taking up the position, he was sent to England for further studies and spent one term at Monkton Combe School, near Bath, Somerset which was founded in 1868 by the Revd Francis Pocock, a former curate to the Bishop of Sierra Leone.

He was ordained a deacon in 1881 and a priest in 1884.

After the death of Bishop Crowther, CMS nominated an Englishman as the new Bishop to hold the title of Bishop of Western Equatorial Africa and also nominated two African assistant bishops. Rev. J. Sidney Hill was made bishop designate and following a preliminary mission undertaken by Hill, Oluwole and Rev. Charles Philips were nominated to become Assistant Bishops.

In 1893, Oluwole was consecrated as the Assistant Bishop of Western Equatorial Africa at St Paul's Cathedral, London, Ludgate Hill on June 29, 1893 and was subsequently awarded a doctor of divinity degree from the University of Durham.

On December 13 1893, Oluwole, Hill, Philips and 12 other English priests arrived in Lagos. Hill and his wife died shortly afterwards: Hill on January 6 1894, after spending just 24 days in Lagos. Herbert Tugwell was chosen as Hill's replacement.

In 1920, the Diocese of Equatorial Africa was split into two, the Lagos and Diocese on the Niger. Oluwole's title was changed to Assistant Bishop of the Diocese of Lagos.

Oluwole married in 1888 and had six children, three of whom died before 1932. His son Isaac Ladipo Oluwole studied medicine at the University of Glasgow graduating MB ChB in 1918.
