= Samuel Akpabot =

Nigerian composer, educator, and author

Samuel Ekpe Akpabot
- Born: 3 October 1932; Uyo, Akwa Ibom State, Nigeria
- Died: 7 August 2000 (aged 67); Uyo, Nigeria
- Occupation: Composer

Academic background
- Education: Michigan State University

Academic work
- Discipline: Music
- Sub-discipline: Ethnomusicology

Samuel Ekpe Akpabot (3 October 1932 – 7 August 2000) was a Nigerian music composer, ethnomusicologist and author.

== Early life and education ==
Akpabot was born in Uyo, Akwa Ibom State, Nigeria, to parents of Ibibio heritage. He was educated at Baptist Academy and King's College, Lagos; at the latter, he was classmates with Emeka Ojukwu, Lateef Jakande and Alex Ekwueme. During his time at King's College, he took up playing football, becoming captain of the college's team in his senior year. From King's College, he proceeded to work as a sports journalist with the Daily Times. His love for football continued in the 1980s as a sports columnist for the Daily Sketch, Ibadan, and the Nigerian Tribune.

In Lagos, he was a chorister with the Christ Church Cathedral of Lagos Island then under the leadership of Ekundayo Phillips and from 1943 to 1952, he lived in the Bishop's Court, the residence of Leslie Vining. In 1949, he started a highlife band called The Akpabot Players. In 1953, he proceeded to study at Royal College of Music, London. On returning to Nigeria, he became a senior music producer with the Nigerian Broadcasting Corporation.

Akpabot earned a doctorate degree from Michigan State University.

== Academic career ==
After spending three years with the Nigerian Broadcasting Corporation, Akpabot joined the music department of University of Nigeria, Nsukka, as an assistant lecturer. At the university, he taught students African music and music history. In 1964, he travelled abroad to further his studies at University of Chicago. On the completion of his studies, he returned to Nigeria in 1967 and taught at Nsukka from 1967 to 1970, a period spanning the Nigerian Civil War. He left Nsukka in 1970 to become a senior research fellow at Obafemi Awolowo University. At Ife, he was director of Chapel Music and was involved in the annual Ife Festival of Arts. He left Ife in 1973 to pursue his doctorate at Michigan State University.

== Works ==
Akapabot's first major composition was "Scenes from Nigeria", a 12-minute orchestral piece with an African flavour created to celebrate Nigeria's independence. In 1962, he composed a string orchestra piece entitled "Three Nigerian Dances". In the following year, Akpabot composed one of his well-known works, "Ofala Festival", a tone poem that was composed for the American Wind Symphony Orchestra. In 1965, he composed "Cynthia's Lament", another piece for the wind symphony orchestra of Pittsburgh.

From 1970 to 1973, Akpabot was director of chapel music at Obafemi Awolowo University. While there, he composed a folk song, "Ise Oluwa", for the Ife Arts Festival, and "Jaja of Opobo", an operetta in Efik, English and Igbo for the festival.

While studying for his doctorate in Michigan, he composed "Nigeria in Conflict" for the wind symphony orchestra, his third piece for the Pittsburgh-based organisation. Akpabot's last major orchestra piece was Verba Christi, a vocal composition with instrument accompaniment that was commissioned by the Nigerian Broadcasting Corporation for FESTAC 77.

=== Writings ===
- Ibibio Music in Nigerian Culture, Michigan State University Press, 1975. ISBN 0870131931
- Introduction to African Music, Oxford University Press, 1978.
- Foundation of Nigerian Traditional Music, Ibadan: Spectrum Books. 1986. ISBN 9782265772
- Form, Function, and Style in African Music, Macmillan Nigeria, 1998. ISBN 9780182446
