= Ivana Loudová =

Czech composer (1941–2017)

- Born: 8 March 1941; Chlumec nad Cidlinou, Protectorate of Bohemia and Moravia
- Died: 25 July 2017 (aged 76); Prague, Czech Republic

Ivana Loudová (8 March 1941 – 25 July 2017) was a Czech composer who composed over a hundred orchestral, chamber, vocal and choral works.

== Early life and education ==
Ivana Loudová was born on 8 March 1941 in Chlumec nad Cidlinou. Her mother taught her piano from a young age. When she attempted to make improvements to classical pieces, her mother disapproved, telling her "What's given in the notes has to be played according to the notes. If you want it to be different, then write it yourself, separately". From then Loudová began to write her own short piano pieces.

In 1958, Loudová entered the Creative Youth Competition in Bratislava, where she got to the middle round of the competition. She played Beethoven's Sonata Pathetique and her own composition Ten Variations on a Theme of My Own. When the jury rated her own piece higher than her piano performance, Loudová decided that she wanted to become a composer. That same year, she began to study composition with Miloslav Kabeláč, whom she studied with until 1961. Afterwards, she attended the Prague Academy of Music and Dramatic Arts under Emil Hlobil from 1961 to 1966. Loudová worked as an assistant in her former teacher Kabeláč's composition class from 1968 to 1972. Due to a scholarship from the French government, Loudová was able to intern at the Centre Bourdan in Paris and study under Olivier Messiaen and Andre Jolivet. During her time in Paris, she also worked with the Groupe de recherches musicales.

== Career ==
After finishing her studies, Loudová worked as a freelance composer until 1992. In her choral works, she composed Vocal Symphony in 1965. However in her later choral works she focused on writing pieces for children such as Little Christmas Cantata. She also wrote music for American Wind Symphony Orchestra.

She won a prize at the GEDOK competition in Mannheim for her composition Rhapsody in Black in 1967. She won the Guido d'Arezzo competition three times in 1978, 1980 and 1984.

From 1992, Loudová taught composition at the Academy of Music and Dramatic Arts in Prague. In 1996, she founded Studio N for new music there in 1996.

Other awards she received include the Heidelberger Kunstpreis in 1993, a Ministry of Culture award in 2015 and the Copyright Protection Association award in 2017.

== Death ==
Ivana Loudová died on 25 July 2017 in Prague, aged 76, after a long illness.
