= 1897 Lagos strike =

Labour strike in Lagos, Nigeria

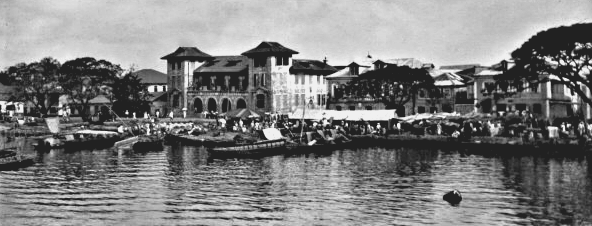
The waterfront in Lagos, photographed at the end of the 19th century

The Lagos strike of 1897 was a labour strike in Lagos Colony (modern-day Lagos in Nigeria) which has been described as the first "major labour protest of the colonial period" in African history.

Lagos was one of the major ports in West Africa and was a busy entrepot through which trade between the coast and the interior was processed. The city's economy expanded widely during the 19th century. At the time of the strike, Lagos was a colony under the governorship of Henry McCallum. McCallum, who had held a number of important colonial posts in Asia, decided to launch a major reform of the administration and economy of Lagos. Among these reforms was the driving down of wages paid to indigenous workers to increase the supply of labour.

The reforms led to unrest among workers in the Public Works Department (PWD). The final trigger for the strike was a decision to alter the working hours of employees of the PWD. The strike broke out on 9 August 1897 and involved nearly 3,000 workers. The colony's police, the Public Force, experienced a minor mutiny on 10 August, meaning that McCallum was unable to repress the workers by force. The strikers' demands were opposed by the indigenous, Europeanised middle-class.

During negotiations with the strikers, McCallum made notable concessions. The planned pay reductions were abandoned, while the working hours reforms were tempered by the introduction of a lunch break. The strikers returned to work and the strike is considered successful.

== Bibliography ==
- Davidson, Basil (1978). Let Freedom Come: Africa in Modern History. Ann Arbor: Little Brown.
- Hopkins, A. G. (1966). "The Lagos Strike of 1897: An Exploration in Nigerian Labour History". Past & Present (35): 133–155. JSTOR 649969.
