= Isaac Ladipo Oluwole =

- Born: 1892; Lagos, Nigeria
- Died: 1953 (aged 60–61)
- Education: MB, ChB (1918)
- Alma mater: University of Glasgow
- Occupation: Medical doctor

Isaac Ladipo Oluwole (1892–1953) was a Nigerian medical doctor who made important improvements to the public health services in Nigeria.

== Early years ==
Isaac Ladipo Oluwole was born around 1892, son of the Anglican bishop Isaac Oluwole and Abigal Johnson, a music teacher. His father was principal of CMS Grammar School, Lagos at the time he was born. He was raised in a Christian household which was also influenced by the Victorian lifestyle of Lagos in the eighteenth century. He briefly attended CMS Grammar School before moving to King's College. He and James Churchill Vaughan were both among the pioneer students at King's College, Lagos when it opened in September 1909. Oluwole was the first Senior Prefect of the School. Later Oluwole and Vaughan both went to the University of Glasgow in 1913 to study Medicine. The two students were conspicuous by their colour, and were subject to racial prejudice. Oluwole was called "Darkness visible" after the phrase from Milton's Paradise Lost.

After graduating as MB, ChB in 1918, Oluwole returned to Nigeria. He went into general practice in Abeokuta for a few years, then returned to Glasgow to take his DPH. While in Abeokuta, he set up a general medicine practice whereby he received patients in his office or visited them in their residence. During his stay in Abeokuta, he was involved in a few community activities. He established a Boy Scout troop in 1923; the troop received the Prince of Wales when he visited Abeokuta.

== Medical officer ==
In 1922, the Lagos Town Council that was previously dominated by Europeans opened doors to newly elected African members. The new members started to make a push for the employment of an African medical officer for public health in the Lagos municipal board of health. In 1924, the council decided to recruit an African who could speak the local language; Oluwole and two others applied for the position. Oluwole was successful but prior to assuming duty, he had to undergo further training in public health administration. In 1925, he started work as the first African assistant Medical Officer of Health in Lagos.

In 1917, Lagos passed the public health ordinance, a series of health regulations to improve sanitation in the city. However, implementation of the rules was hampered by the limited number of trained personnel. Oluwole then founded the first School of Hygiene in Nigeria, at Yaba, Lagos, providing training to Sanitary Inspectors from all parts of Nigeria. On graduation they obtained the Diploma of the Royal Institute of Public Health, London. He re-organised sanitary inspection procedures in the port of Lagos to control the spread of bubonic plague. He also set up the West African board of the Royal Society of Health that became the foundation of standards of public health in Nigeria.

The plague, breaking out in unsanitary shanty towns in Lagos, caused many deaths between 1924 and 1930. Many of the slums were demolished, forcing their inhabitants to resettle into the unregulated suburbs.

== Public health education ==
Among other achievements, Oluwole opened the Massey Street Dispensary, reclaimed swampy islands to aid in malaria control and built a new abattoir to improve food hygiene. Oluwole started the first school health services in Lagos in 1925. He introduced regular sanitary inspections and vaccinations of children. Oluwole was appointed Medical Officer of Health in 1936.

=== Antenatal and childcare ===
Through the efforts of Oluwole, the Lagos Town Council established the Massey dispensary in 1926. A department of antenatal and child welfare services was created to be part of the new dispensary. This was the first measure in the city to create a distinct maternity and child services program within the Lagos Public Health department. The new antenatal clinic's major objective was to reduce the incidence of child and maternal mortality in Lagos. From 1926 to 1930, the Massey dispensary created programs such infant welfare clinics that were held thrice weekly and an organised a children's ward. Due to the success of the Massey clinic another clinic was established for the Lagos mainland residents in Ebute Metta. The clinic also organised programs to treat health visitors and mid-wives who advised patients during clinic hours. The health visitors also visited discharged patients to check on their welfare and promote good health practices.

=== School of Health service ===
Oluwole also focused his attention on school age children. Though, hygiene was taught in many schools, it was mostly theoretical and lacked practical and visual demonstrations. In 1927, he visited about 57 schools in the Lagos area where he inspected the sanitary conditions of the schools; a year later he made similar trips. Oluwole saw some shortcomings in the sanitary conditions of the schools and proposed some remedies. In 1930, regulations were enacted that made it necessary for mandatory sanitary inspections of schools and also health inspection of students every three years. The major objective was to discover ailments some children have contracted, to provide medical treatment to alleviate the ailments and educate school teachers about better practices in hygiene and sanitation.

In 1940 Oluwole was awarded the Order of the British Empire (OBE). When he died in 1953 he was recognised as the father of public health in Nigeria.
