= William Rice Mulliner =

Acting Governor of Lagos

Captain William Rice Mulliner

Acting Governor of Lagos Colony
- In office 1863 – 25 July 1863
- Preceded by: Henry Stanhope Freeman
- Succeeded by: John Hawley Glover

Personal details
- Born: 11 June 1834 Northampton
- Died: 25 July 1863 (aged 29) Steamer Ethiope
- Profession: Military Officer

William Rice Mulliner (11 June 1834 – 25 July 1863) was a British officer who was the acting governor of the Lagos Colony in 1863.

On 1 September 1854 Mulliner obtained a commission by purchase as Ensign with the 3rd West India regiment. Captain Mulliner was appointed Acting Governor of Lagos colony in 1863 while the Governor Henry Stanhope Freeman was absent due to illness. He visited Abeokuta in May 1863, travelling by gunboat to the mouth of the Aghoe creek, and then by canoe, accompanied by Commodore Wilmot of the British navy. He met the Bashorun of Abeokuta, who told him that the recent robberies of traders' property were due to the war with Ibadan. It was the custom to suppress trading so as to force the men to war, and the plunder would cease when the war was over. In the meantime, traders should not travel to Abeokuta since their safety could not be guaranteed.

Mulliner died on 25 July 1863 while on board the African mail steamer Ethiope near Bathurst, aged 29. He was replaced as Acting Governor by John Hawley Glover.

William was the fourth and youngest son of Northampton Coach Maker and Coach Master, Francis Mulliner (1789–1841) and his wife née Jane Manton (1796–1875). His three elder brothers spread their father's coach building businesses across the Midlands to Liverpool and down to London.
