= American Wind Symphony Orchestra =

American musical ensemble

The American Wind Symphony Orchestra (AWSO, also called the American Wind Symphony, or AWS) is an American musical ensemble incorporating many of the wind instruments found in a symphony orchestra. It is dedicated to the performance of contemporary classical music and is known for having commissioned over 400 new works. Based in Mars, Pennsylvania, the AWSO was founded 1957 and directed for 50 years by the American conductor (and former trumpeter) Robert Austin Boudreau (1927–2024).

== Description ==
The AWSO, whose membership changes from year to year, typically is composed of young professional musicians. Many of the works it performs feature an unusually large instrumentation usually including at least 4 flutes (doubling on piccolo, alto flute, and bass flute), 4 oboes (doubling on English horn and oboe d'amore), 4 bassoons (doubling on contrabassoon and heckelphone), 4 clarinets (doubling on E-flat clarinet, basset horn, bass clarinet, and contrabass clarinet), 4–6 trumpets, 4–7 horns, 4–6 trombones, a bass trombone, and 1–2 tubas. Percussion, harp, piano, and celeste are usually included as well, but, unlike most concert bands, saxophones and euphoniums are never used.

== Concert venues ==
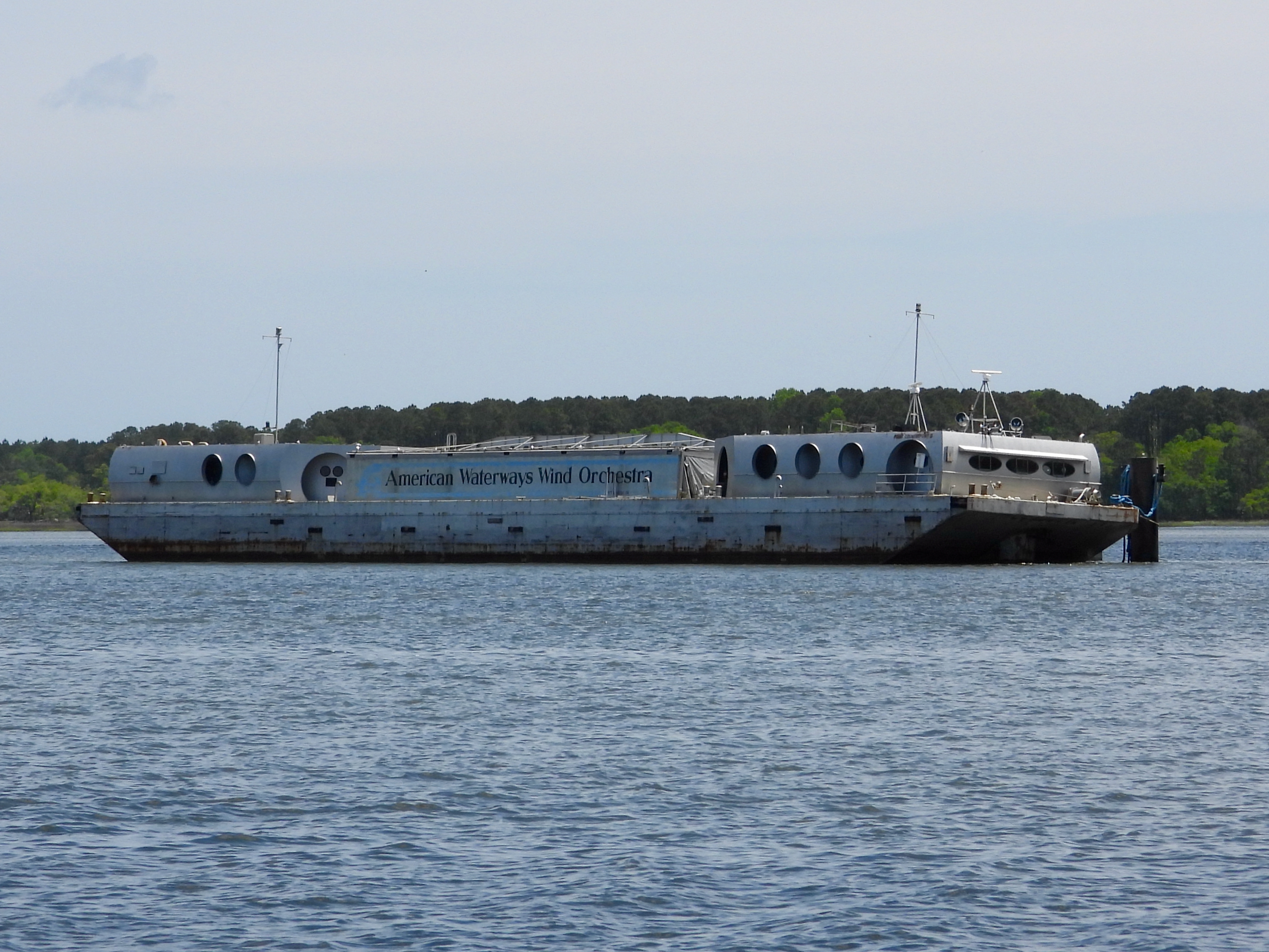
One of the American Waterways Wind Orchestra barges tied up in South Carolina in 2025

The AWSO usually has performed annually during the summer months on a floating arts center designed by the American architect Louis Kahn. Point Counterpoint II, constructed in 1976, is the second boat used by the orchestra. The original Point Counterpoint was a coal-transporting barge converted by Kahn in 1961, and named after the Point State Park in downtown Pittsburgh, near where it was constructed. The newer boat was designed to be able to navigate American canals and locks more easily than the original vessel. Kahn died suddenly in 1974, two years before the new boat debuted in celebration of the American Bicentennial.

The Point Counterpoint II measures 195 feet (59 m) long and 38 feet (12 m) wide, and features a large overhead canopy to shelter performers and diffuse the sound. The underside of the hinged canopy shows a series of square, circular domed, and pyramidal cavities, similar to the ceiling of the Yale University Art Gallery building, an iconic design by Kahn. The overhead structure can be lowered over the barge for protection and easier transport. As a flourish, Boudeau liked to start a performance with Aaron Copland's Fanfare for the Common Man while the hinged canopy gradually opened, revealing the performers.

Aboard, there are also rooms for up to 13 crew members, staff, and the director to live, an art gallery below deck, and a small theater where special patrons' concerts take place. The other personnel of the large group must travel by land, and stay overnight in accommodations provided by hosts of the tours.

In 2017 with the retirement of Robert Boudreau near the age of 90, the future of the orchestra and its home, the Point Counterpoint II, appeared bleak. The 1,600-ton barge looked like it was headed for the scrapyard, when renowned cellist Yo-Yo Ma wrote in the July New York Review of Books appealing for help. In response, bids to save the vessel came in from London, Paris, Estonia, Philadelphia, Charleston (South Carolina), Washington DC, Kingston (New York), and Buffalo (New York), among other places. As of August 2017, Boudreau was evaluating a number of bids, some reputedly between $3–4 million.

== Performances and tours ==
The founder and longtime conductor of the AWSO was Robert Boudreau, a graduate of the Juilliard School and a former Fulbright Scholar. He also held a captain's license, and piloted the Point Counterpoint II on numerous concert tours through canals and rivers in the US and Europe. Each summer, the group has performed on the barge's stage, anchored in one of Pittsburgh's rivers. The group also has performed on the barge along various waterways of the United States (including the Ohio and Mississippi Rivers, as well as their tributaries), giving concerts along the way. The orchestra spent three years overseas, where they were present for the Bicentennial celebration of France, the 800th Anniversary in England, and were the first US vessel in Leningrad.

Boudreau took a hiatus of several years after the 2004 residency, but after Hurricanes Katrina and Rita felt compelled to travel to Louisiana in 2006. The post-disaster tour was called the "Spirit of Louisiana", and the reception in the southernmost cities of Louisiana was so great the orchestra returned for a few weeks in 2007. Boudreau once again announced a retirement as music director following the final concert of the 2007 season at Yale University.

A 2008 New England tour was being developed for June and July, to begin at Highcroft, Boudreau's farm in Pine Township, Pennsylvania. The orchestra would have three residencies there, performing at the Caroline Steinman Nunan Amphitheater. The orchestra would then meet up with Point Counterpoint II in Narragansett, Rhode Island, with performances in Maine to follow for several weeks. The orchestra would then proceed up the Hudson River to the Erie Canal and have closing concerts at the end of July back at Highcroft.

In March 2013, the Sheriff's Office of Okaloosa County, Florida, issued a warrant for Boudreau's arrest, alleging grand theft of $25,000 in appearance fees for a June 2012 concert which the AWSO never performed. He was never arrested, but went to Florida as required by law, where the authorities took his picture and his fingerprints. Boudreau signed a note that promised he would appear if required before a judge, and returned to Pennsylvania. His lawyer represented him at a later hearing, and the judge dismissed all charges without prejudice. Boudreau cited a lack of housing for the orchestra members as reason for the failure to perform, and refused to return the funds, claiming that he thought they were "a donation to the orchestra".

Boudreau's wife, Kathleen, has assisted with the organization of the AWSO. She was writing a book on the history of the AWSO from her perspective throughout the years. Together they planned all the group's tours, reared a large family, and farmed over 120 acres (49 hectares) in Pennsylvania. Boudreau's actions at times antagonized the larger professional music community of Pittsburgh, and caused him to be charged with unfair labor practices with regard to the treatment of his musicians.

Robert Boudreau died on July 4, 2024, at the age of 97.

== Composers commissioned by the AWSO ==
The AWSO has a long history of commissioning original works, many of which also feature extensive use of percussion instruments:

- Samuel Adler
- Samuel Akpabot
- David Amram
- Thom Anderson
- Alexander Arutiunian
- Blas Atehortua
- Georges Auric
- Henk Badings
- Robert Russell Bennett
- Warren Benson
- Elmer Bernstein
- William Bolcom
- Eugène Bozza
- Lee Bracegirdle
- Henry Brant
- Leo Brouwer
- Jacques Castérède
- Chou Wen-Chung
- Paul Creston
- Ton de Leeuw
- Daniel Dorff
- Halim El-Dabh
- Akin Euba
- Robert Farnon
- Luboš Fišer
- Jean Françaix
- Bernd Franke
- Mats Larsson Gothe
- Carmago Guarnieri
- Alan Hovhaness
- J. J. Johnson
- George Kleinsinger
- Norman Lloyd
- Nikolai Lopatnikoff
- Ivana Loudová
- Toshiro Mayuzumi
- Robert McBride
- Colin McPhee
- Akira Miyoshi
- Oliver Nelson
- Bo Nilsson
- Javier Gimenez Noble
- Arne Nordheim
- Krzysztof Olczak
- Ben-Zion Orgad
- Juan Orrego-Salas
- Krzysztof Penderecki
- Andrei Petrov
- Zbigniew Pniewski
- Carlos Rafael Rivera
- Joaquín Rodrigo
- Bernard Rogers
- Ned Rorem
- Ramon Santos
- Jerzy Sapieyevski
- Lalo Schifrin
- Hale Smith
- Harry Somers
- Gottfried Stoeltzel
- Carlos Surinach
- Erkki-Sven Tüür
- Ivan Tcherepnin
- Sergei Tcherepnin
- Roberto Valera
- Heitor Villa-Lobos
- Healey Willan
- Patrick Zuk
