= Christopher Sapara Williams =

Nigerian lawyer

Chief Christopher Sapara Williams CMG
- Born: Christopher Alexander Sapara Williams; 14 July 1855; Sierra Leone
- Died: 15 March 1915 (aged 59)
- Education: Inner Temple
- Occupation: Barrister
- Known for: Political activity

Chief Christopher Alexander Sapara Williams CMG (14 July 1855 – 15 March 1915) was the first indigenous Nigerian lawyer, called to the English bar on 17 November 1879. In addition to his legal practice, he came to play an influential role in the politics of Nigeria during the colonial era. He held the chieftaincy title of the Lodifi of Ilesha.

Chief Sapara Williams was the elder brother of Oguntola Sapara, who became a prominent physician.

== Early years ==
Williams was born on 14 July 1855. He was of Ijesha origin, but was born in Sierra Leone. He studied the Law in London at the Inner Temple, and was called to the English bar on 17 November 1879. Returning from the United Kingdom, he began practising law in Lagos Colony on 13 January 1888. He had an unmatched reputation as an advocate, and had intimate knowledge of unwritten customary law. He enrolled in the Nigerian Bar Association on 30 January 1888, and was Chairman of the Nigerian Bar Association from 1900 to 1915.

Although Williams was the first indigenous Nigerian to formally qualify as a lawyer, he was not the only one to practice the law. Due to the shortage of qualified lawyers, until 1913 it was common for non-lawyers with basic education and some knowledge of English law to be appointed to practice as attorneys.

== Political career ==
Williams was nominated to the Legislative Council, serving as a member from October 1901 until his death in 1915. In 1903 there was a crisis over the payment of the tolls that were collected from traders by native rulers, although Europeans were exempted. The alternative was to replace the tolls by a subsidy. Governor William MacGregor requested views from Williams, Charles Joseph George and Obadiah Johnson as indigenous opinion leaders. All were in favour of retaining the tolls to avoid upsetting the rulers. In 1903 governor MacGregor nominated Williams for a knighthood, but his recommendation was turned down.

In 1904, Williams moved that "the present boundary between the Colony and Protectorate of Southern Nigeria and the Protectorate of Northern Nigeria be re-adjusted by bringing the southern portion into Southern Nigeria, so that the entire tribes of the Yoruba-speaking people should be under one and the same administration". Sir Frederick Lugard had opposed this proposal on the grounds of administrative convenience, and the eventual decision largely followed his beliefs. The principle applied was to group people who were at roughly the same political and social level into one province rather than to try to align the provinces with ethnic boundaries.

In 1905, Williams visited England. While there, he made several suggestions to the Colonial Office for changes to imperial policy. These included establishing a teachers training college in Lagos, and having more continuity of policy by the governors of the colony. Sapara Williams challenged the Seditious Offenses Ordinances of 1909, which suppressed press criticism of the government. He pointed out that "freedom of the Press is the great Palladium of British liberty ... Sedition is a thing incompatible with the character of the Yoruba people, and has no place in their constitution ... Hyper-sensitive officials may come tomorrow who will see sedition in every criticism and crime in every mass meeting". Despite his plea, the bill became law.

Williams encouraged Herbert Macauley to convene an inaugural meeting of the Lagos Auxiliary of the Anti-Slavery and Aborigines Protection Society on 30 August 1910, which gave Macauley a platform for producing popular opposition to colonial practices.

When Northern and Southern Nigeria were united in 1914, the new legislative council was headed by the Governor, and consisted of seven British officials, two British non-officials and two Nigerians, one of whom was Williams.

He died on 15 March 1915, aged 59.

== Beliefs ==
Williams' views on development of the colony included close association with European ideas and institutions, and he was against thoughtless and nonconstructive criticism of the administration. However, although Williams in many ways accepted European concepts and values, in October 1896 he sponsored an Egungun dance, a traditional ceremony. Moves such as this by one of the leaders of the Ekitis in Lagos were welcomed by the traditional rulers of the Yoruba. Williams once said: "A lawyer lives for the direction of his people and the advancement of the cause of his country".
