= The History of the Yorubas =

1921 historical book by Rev. Samuel Johnson

- Editor: Obadiah Johnson
- Author: Samuel Johnson
- Language: English
- Subject: History of the Yoruba people
- Publisher: C.M.S. Bookshops (NG); Cambridge University Press (UK)
- Publication date: 1921
- Publication place: Lagos, NG
- Media type: Print (Hardcover and Paperback)
- Pages: 684
- ISBN: 1-10802-099-2

The History of the Yorubas: From the Earliest Times to the Beginning of the British Protectorate is a historical book by Nigerian diplomat and historian Samuel Johnson. It was originally completed in 1897 but was lost and eventually reconstructed after his death by his brother Obadiah Johnson who then went on to publish it in 1921. The book is recognized worldwide as a pioneering historical study and is considered the most influential volume about the Yoruba people, which sealed the two Johnsons' places in history.

== Background ==
"Samuel Johnson (1846-1901) was an Anglican minister and historian renowned for his magisterial history of the Yoruba people. Born in Freetown in Sierra Leone and educated by the Church Missionary Society, Johnson was sent with his family to Ibadan in Nigeria in 1857. He was ordained in 1880 and by 1897 had finished the manuscript for The History of the Yorubas. However the original publisher mysteriously misplaced the manuscript. After Johnson's death his brother, Dr Obadiah Johnson, recompiled the text from Samuel's notes. This volume, first published in 1921, contains that reconstructed edition. This pioneering volume brought together various oral and recorded accounts of Yoruba history, describing not only political history but also social customs, language and laws. Although recent analysis of the text has revealed some inaccuracies, this volume remains the standard reference for the history of the Yoruba people."

— back cover of Cambridge edition of The History of the Yorubas
