= Charles Phillips (bishop) =

Nigerian clergyman (??–1906)

Bishop of Ondo
- In office 29 June 1893 – 1906

Personal details
- Died: 1906
- Occupation: Clergyman

Charles Phillips was a member of the Church Mission Society (CMS) based in the Lagos Colony who became Bishop of Ondo.

== Early career ==
Charles Phillips was the son of an Egba former slave also called Charles Phillips who returned from Sierra Leone to work as a catechist at Ijaye. Phillips gained his secondary education at the CMS Training Institution at Abeokuta. He was taught by G.F. Buhler, who served from 1857 to 1864. For twelve years Phillips was catechist at Breadfruit Church in Lagos. Phillips was ordained as a Native deacon on 5 March 1876, with Daniel Coker and Nathaniel Johnson. In 1873 Captain Glover, the Governor of Lagos colony, helped to restore the deposed king of Ondo to his throne. In gratitude, the king invited the CMS to establish a mission in his city. The mission was opened two years later. In January 1877 Phillips took charge as pastor at Ondo.

== Pastor ==
Photograph of Lagos Mission in 1885. Back row: W.Morgan, Charles Phillips, J.White, Archdeacon Hamilton, Nathaniel Johnson, Isaac Oluwole, R.E. Willoughby Middle row: Rev. V.S.Wright, Mrs. Ingham, Bishop Ingham, Mrs Darwin Fox, Rev. James Johnson, Rev. J.W.Dickinson Front row: Rev.F.W.Dodd, Rev. W. Darwin Fox

Conversion of the "heathen" Yoruba was helped by similarities or analogies between Christianity and the traditional Yoruba religion. In 1878 Phillips wrote of an old woman who became convinced that "prayer is more efficacious than sacrifice" after her husband and her brother recovered from illness. On the other hand, Phillips reported that "the generality of our Lagos young men begin to think that polygamy is not opposed to the principles of Christianity".

In the 1870s there were several outbreaks of smallpox. In July 1879, a Sango priest from out of town called on Phillips, and cynically described how he had accepted gifts to suppress the disease, which would not in fact happen until it had run its course and destroyed all the witches and charm-makers in the country. Later Phillips lost three of his four children to smallpox. He noted that some of the believers of the traditional religion attributed the disease to tolerance of Christianity by the Yorubas. His son Thomas King Ekundayo Phillips, born in 1884, would become for many years organist and Master of the Music at the Cathedral Church of Christ, Lagos.

In 1885 a visiting mission reported that the Rev. Phillips at times served as an interpreter for CMS preachers at Yoruba services in Lagos. Towards the end of the Yoruba Wars, the Lagos administration, acting through Samuel Johnson and Charles Phillips, arranged a ceasefire in 1886 and then a treaty that guaranteed the independence of the Ekiti towns. The British House of Commons recorded its appreciation of the work that the two Yorubas had done for their country. Ilorin refused to cease fighting however, and the war dragged on for several more years.

== Bishop of Ondo ==
Bishop Charles Phillips, Rev. E.M. Lijadu, and elders of the church at Ondo, 1901.

In 1891 the Anglican church created the diocese of Western Equatorial Africa, based in Lagos and headed by Bishop Hill, who died of fever almost as soon as he arrived from England. Herbert Tugwell replaced Hill in 1894. The CMS decided to create two assistant bishops to help with the workload of the large diocese and to assuage African opinion. James Johnson, although the most prominent clergyman in the colony, was considered unsafe. Instead the more conservative Charles Phillips was appointed, along with Isaac Oluwole, a former principal of the CMS Grammar School, Lagos.

Phillips has left a record of the embarrassment he felt when approached by J.S. Hill on 2 November 1892 about the position of assistant bishop. He felt that he did not have sufficient experience, that he was poorly educated and that "there are eligible seniors whose presence makes my selection very inviduous and uncomfortable". Joseph Sidney Hill, Isaac Oluwole and Charles Phillips were consecrated as bishop and assistant bishops on 29 June 1893.

Operating in the eastern part of Yorubaland at some distance from Lagos, Phillips had a degree of independence but still had to report to the European-controlled Executive Council in Lagos. Although he visited the missionaries in his territory annually and had some control over them, they refused to have an African as their ecclesiastical master. By 1899, Phillips had a community of 158 converts at Ondo. Phillips attempted to organize a church at Ile-Ife, but met resistance from the Ooni Olubuse of Ife who did not want to upset the priests of the traditional religion. With difficulty, land was acquired at Iyekere and a small church and school were built in 1899. The Ooni remained hostile however, causing difficulties until Olubose died in 1919.

== Descendants ==
Counted amongst the bishop's descendants is the award-winning Nollywood actress Joke Silva, his great-granddaughter.
