= William McCoskry =

British merchant

Acting Governor of Lagos Colony
- In office 6 August 1861 – 22 January 1862
- Succeeded by: Henry Stanhope Freeman

Personal details
- Profession: Merchant

William McCoskry was a British merchant who served as Consul at Lagos, then as acting Governor of Lagos Colony.

== Lagos trader ==
McCoskry reached Lagos in early 1852, soon after the Oba Kosoko was expelled. He had already represented the British firm of W.B. Hutton in West Africa for seven years. McCoskry, a Scotsman, was known as "A l'agbon pipon" (man with the red beard) by the Yoruba people. Apongbon in the west of Lagos Island derives its name from this phrase. McCoskry got on bad terms with Benjamin Campbell, who arrived on 21 July 1853 to take up the position of Consul. He even attempted to ship palm oil without paying duties. Campbell later recommended McCoskry as vice-consul for Badagry. He held this position briefly between 1855 and 1856. In March 1856, McCoskry was acting for Consul Campbell, who was away from the colony on a visit to the Benin River, when a plot was discovered to overturn the Oba of Lagos, Dosunmu. When three cruisers appeared off the bar the plot fizzled out.

== Acting consul ==
A new consul, Henry Grant Foote, arrived at Lagos on 21 December 1860. He appointed McCoskry unpaid vice-consul. In May 1861, while on an expedition into the interior, Foote died of fever and McCoskry took over as Acting Consul. In July 1861, McCoskry signed treaties with Porto Novo and Badagry to facilitate trade with Lagos. At the end of July 1861 Her Majesty's ship Prometheus arrived in the lagoon. A few days later, on 3 August the commander, N.B. Bedingfeld paid a visit to the Oba of Lagos accompanied by McCoskry and a detachment of armed marines, and demanded that Dosunmu sign a treaty to surrender Lagos. The king initially refused. However, on 6 August 1861, Bedingfeld and McCoskry entered into a treaty (The Lagos Treaty of Cession) on behalf of the Queen of Great Britain with "Docemo" (Dosunmu), King of Lagos. Dosunmu transferred sovereignty of the island and territories of Lagos to the British in return for an annual pension.

== Acting governor ==
McCoskry was appointed acting Governor soon after annexation. The slave trade had been outlawed, but slavery continued. McCoskry hinted that after annexation of Lagos Colony unrest among the slaves increased substantially. He remarked that problems related to domestic slavery were giving him "more trouble than all the rest of the business together". He noted that there were many runaway slaves looking for protection in Lagos Colony, which they saw as a refuge. McCloskey recognized the rights of slave owners to retain their property or to receive compensation for liberation. He set up a court to hear cases of abuse against slaves and of runaway slaves from the interior, and established a "Liberated African Yard" to give employment to freed runaways until they were able to look after themselves. He did not consider that abolition of slavery in the colony would be practical. In 1865 McCloskry testified before a parliamentary committee on the conditions at Lagos. He said that rather more than 500 fugitive slaves had arrived in the colony since 1861.

McCloskry, and other merchants in the colony, were opposed to the activities of missionaries which they felt interfered with trade. In 1855 he had been among signatories of a petition to prevent two missionaries who had gone on leave from returning to Lagos. McCloskry communicated his view to the explorer Richard Francis Burton, who visited Lagos and Abeokuta in 1861 while acting as consul at Fernando Poo.

== Later career ==
After serving as acting governor, McCloskry again became a private merchant at Lagos. He was appointed one of three Land Commissioners, making recommendations to the governor on grants of land, in many cases giving formal title to the existing occupants.
