= Olowogbowo =

Area in Lagos Island

Coordinates: 6°27′30″N 3°23′00″E

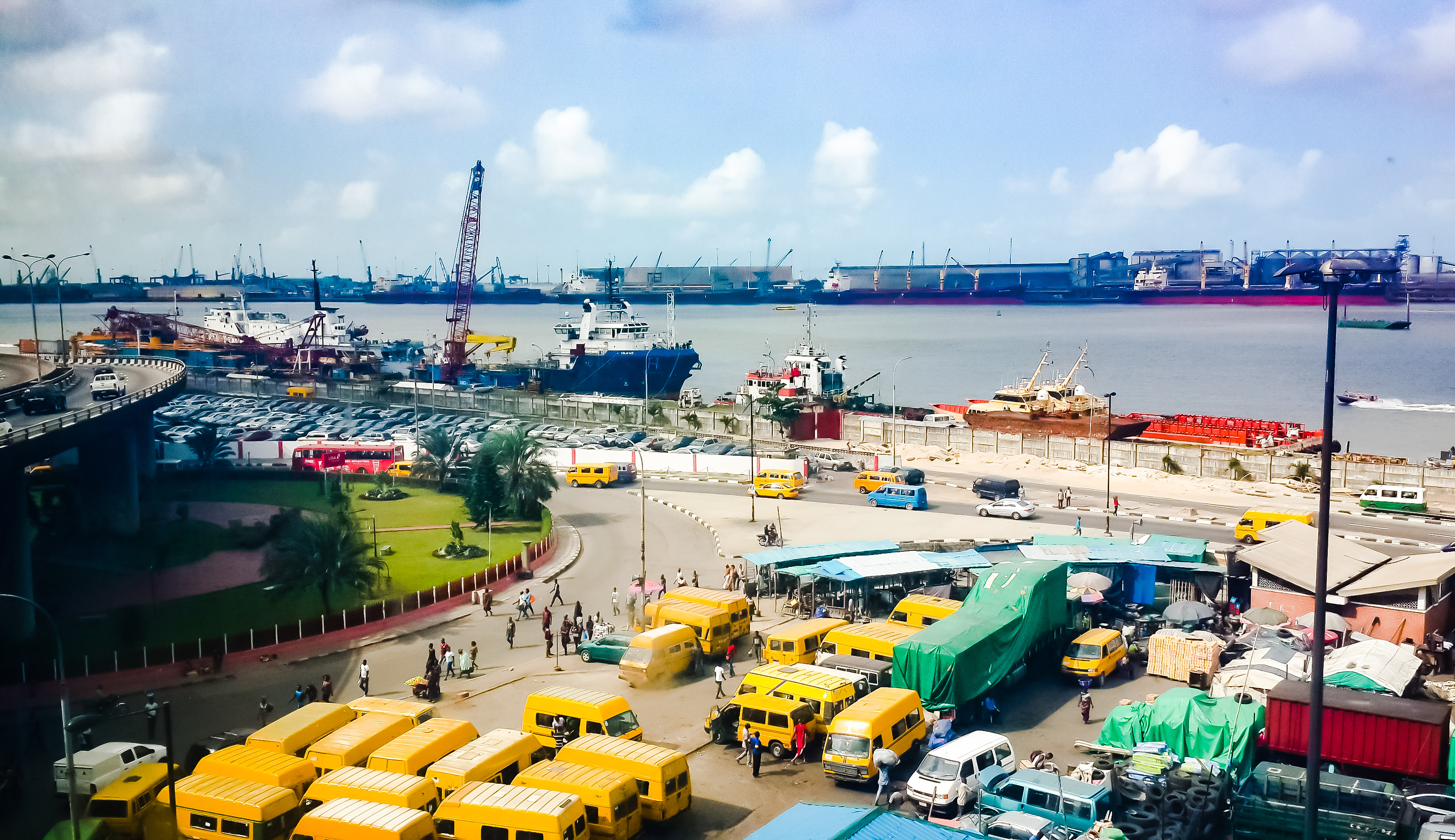
Port at Olowogbowo

Olowogbowo is an area in the west of Lagos Island in Lagos, also known as Apongbon. The area is in the central business district. The community was founded after 1851, when the Yoruba returnees and their descendants who had been set ashore in Sierra Leone returned in successive waves to Lagos, and were granted land to settle in the Olowogbowo and Breadfruit areas of the island.

The name Apongbon is a garbled version of the Yoruba phrase a l'agbon pipon ("man with the red beard"), a name given to William McCoskry, acting governor of the newly established Colony of Lagos in 1861. Jùjú music originated in the Olowogbowo area in the 1920s, when area boys used to gather in a motor mechanic workshop to drink and make music. Tunde King was the leader of this group, generally considered the founder of the style.

Other well-known people from the area include

- G.B.A. Coker, Former Supreme Court Justice of Nigeria and Olori Eyo Adimu.
- F.C.O. Coker, First Nigerian Municipal Treasurer and the First President of ICAN.
- Muiz Banire, Senior Advocate of Nigeria and National Legal Adviser of APC
- H. O. Davies, a Nigerian nationalist, lawyer, journalist, trade union organizer, thought leader, international statesman and politician during the nation's movement towards independence in 1960 and afterward.
- Christopher Oluwole Rotimi, a Nigerian Army officer, diplomat and politician
- Musiliu Smith, an Inspector General of Police of Nigeria
- Munirudeen Adekunle Muse, member of the Senate for Lagos Central
