= James Johnson (assistant bishop of Western Equatorial Africa) =

Sierra Leonean clergyman (c.1836–1917)

James "Holy" Johnson
- Born: c. 1836; Sierra Leone
- Died: 1917 (aged 80–81)
- Education: Fourah Bay Institution
- Occupations: Minister and politician
- Known for: Political activity

James "Holy" Johnson (c. 1836–1917) was a prominent clergyman and one of the first African members of Nigeria's Legislative Council.

== Early life and education ==
He was born in Sierra Leone in 1836 to liberated African parents of Yoruba origin. Johnson enrolled in a Church Mission Society (CMS) school, then went on to Fourah Bay Institution, located in Freetown, graduating in 1858.

== Career ==
Photograph of Lagos Mission in 1885. Back row: W. Morgan, Charles Phillips, J. White, Archdeacon Hamilton, Nathaniel Johnson, Isaac Oluwole, R.E. Willoughby Middle row: Rev. V.S. Wright, Mrs. Ingham, Bishop Ernest Graham Ingham, Mrs. Darwin Fox, Rev. James Johnson, Rev. J.W. Dickinson Front row: Rev. F.W.Dodd, Rev. W. Darwin Fox

He was a school teacher until 1863, when he entered the ministry.

The CMS was impressed by Johnson's potential, and sent him to its Yoruba mission in Nigeria, first in Lagos and then in Abeokuta. He was unsuccessful as a missionary, perhaps because of his rigid morality, and in 1880 was instead appointed pastor of the Breadfruit Church in Lagos.

When the Lagos Colony was separated from the Gold Coast in 1886, the legislative council of the new colony was composed of four official and three unofficial members. Lagos Colony Governor Alfred Moloney nominated two Africans as unofficial representatives, Johnson and the trader Charles Joseph George.

In 1900, Johnson was consecrated a bishop, to serve as an Assistant Bishop in the Diocese of Western Equatorial Africa with oversight of the Niger Delta and Benin territories, holding this post until his death in 1917.

He believed in a puritan, evangelistic Christianity, but was hostile to other aspects of European culture which he felt were not suitable to Africa.

Johnson received the degree Doctor of Divinity (DD) from the Durham University in March 1900.

== See also ==
- List of Christian missionaries
- List of Nigerians
- List of Sierra Leoneans
