= Thomas King Ekundayo Phillips =

Nigerian organist, conductor, composer and teacher

- Thomas Ekundayo Phillips at the 1932 organ at the Cathedral Church, Lagos
- Born: 1884
- Died: 10 July 1969 (aged 84–85)
- Occupation: Organist
- Known for: Father of Nigerian church music

Thomas King Ekundayo Phillips (1884 – 10 July 1969) was a Nigerian organist, conductor, composer and teacher who has been described as the "father of Nigerian church music"

== Life ==
Thomas Ekundayo Phillips was born in 1884. His father was Bishop Charles Phillips of Ondo. He attended the CMS Grammar School, Lagos, then went to the Government Training School for Dispensers, where he qualified as a chemist. He became an optician by profession.

Phillips was encouraged to study music by the Archdeacon Nathaniel, his uncle. His uncle Johnson Phillips, an Anglican priest, gave him his first organ lessons. Solomon Moses Daniels, an organist at Saint Paul's Church, Aroloya, gave him lessons in organ playing. He was assistant organist at Saint Paul's Church, Lagos until 1914.

Phillips attended Trinity College of Music in London from 1911 to 1914, where he studied organ, piano and violin. He was given the Fellowship of Trinity College of Music, London (FTCML) in organ playing, Phillips was the second Nigerian to obtain a baccalaureate degree in music. When he returned to Nigeria in 1914, Bishop Herbert Tugwell invited Phillips to become organist and master of the music at the Cathedral Church of Christ, Lagos. He retained this position for 48 years. Phillips' elder brother became bishop of the cathedral, the second African bishop there after Archbishop Leslie Vining.

Phillips trained students such as Fela Sowande, Ayo Bankole, Lazarus Ekwueme, Christopher Oyesiku and his son Charles Oluwole Obayomi Phillips, who succeeded him at the Cathedral Church of Christ.

In 1964 the University of Nigeria, Nsukka awarded Phillips an honorary Doctor of Music degree for his contributions to development of Nigerian church music.

Phillips died on 10 July 1969. He had five children.

== Work ==
In 1926 Phillips presented a proposal to the Synod of the Diocese of Lagos, which was accepted, to use "native airs" in church services. Most of his work consisted of church music that included hymns, antiphonal chants, choral anthems in Yoruba language and two organ solo works, Passacaglia on an African Folk Song and Variations on an African Folk Song.

Phillips wrote three short organ solo compositions, but most of his organ pieces were based on existing indigenous themes. He made the first modern arrangement of Ise Oluwa, the most popular Yoruba Christian hymn, for SATB with organ accompaniment.

Phillips was the author of Yoruba Music (Johannesburg: African Music Society, 1953), the first musicological treatise by a trained African musician to discuss African music. The book describes Yoruba traditional music in detail and shows how the concepts in this indigenous tradition can be incorporated in modern works.

Phillips was a member of the committee who selected the Nigerian National Anthem in 1960.

== Bibliography ==
- Peel, J.D.Y. (2003). Religious Encounter and the Making of the Yoruba. Indiana University Press. ISBN 0-253-21588-9.
