= Lagos Colony =

British colony and protectorate from 1862 to 1906

Coordinates: 6°27′11″N 3°23′45″E

Lagos Colony and Protectorate
- 1862–1906
- Flag Badge

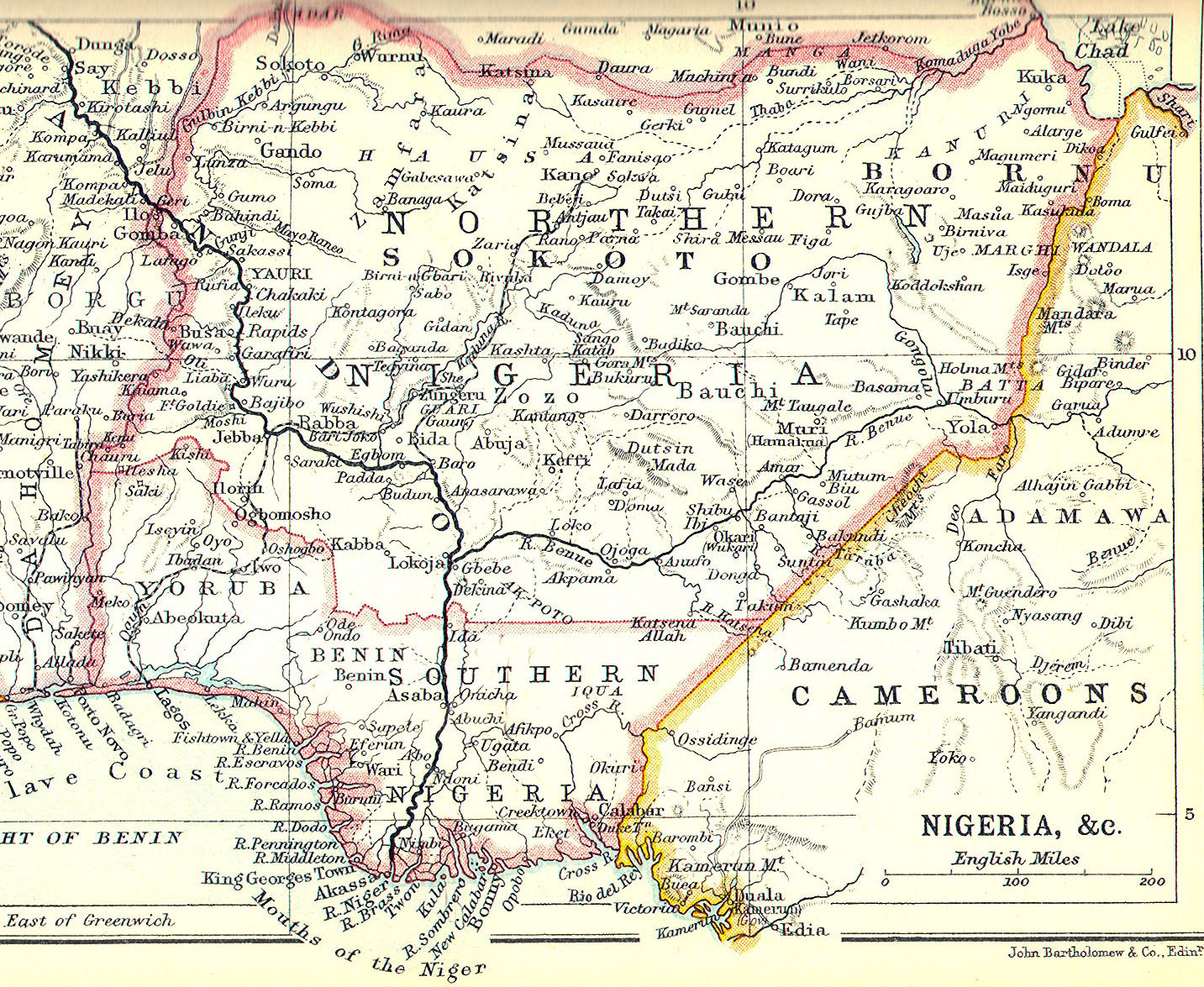
- Status: British Colony
- Capital: Lagos
- Official languages: English

Government
- History
  - Established: 5 March 1862
  - Disestablished: 28 February 1906
Preceded by	Succeeded by
Yorubaland	Southern Nigeria Protectorate
- Today part of: Nigeria

Lagos Colony was a British colonial possession centred on the port of Lagos in what is now southern Nigeria. Lagos was annexed on 6 August 1861 under the threat of force by Commander Beddingfield of HMS Prometheus who was accompanied by the Acting British Consul, William McCoskry. Oba Dosunmu of Lagos (spelled "Docemo" in British documents) resisted the cession for 11 days while facing the threat of violence on Lagos and its people, but capitulated and signed the Lagos Treaty of Cession. Lagos was declared a colony on 5 March 1862. By 1872, Lagos was a cosmopolitan trading centre with a population over 60,000. In the aftermath of prolonged wars between the mainland Yoruba states, the colony established a protectorate over most of Yorubaland between 1890 and 1897. The protectorate was incorporated into the new Southern Nigeria Protectorate in February 1906, and Lagos became the capital of the Protectorate of Nigeria in January 1914. Since then, Lagos has grown to become the largest city in West Africa, with an estimated metropolitan population of over 21 million as of 2023

== Location ==
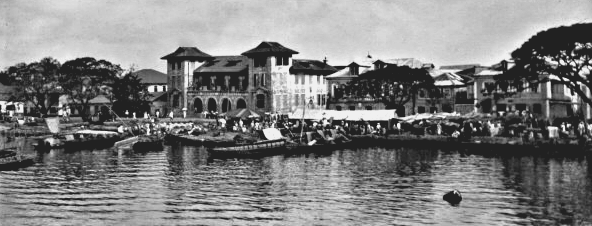

Lagos was originally a fishing community on the north of Lagos Island, which lies in Lagos Lagoon, a large protected harbour on the Atlantic coast of Africa in the Gulf of Guinea west of the Niger River delta. The Lagoon is protected from the ocean by long sand spits that run east and west for up to 100 kilometres (62 mi) in both directions. Lagos has a tropical savanna climate with two rainy seasons. The heaviest rains fall from April to July and there is a weaker rainy season in October and November. Total annual rainfall is 1,900 millimetres (75 in). Average temperatures range from 25 °C (77 °F) in July to 29 °C (84 °F) in March.

For many years, the staple products of the region were palm oil and palm kernels. Manufacture of palm oil was mainly considered a job for women. Later exports included copra made from the coconut palm, guinea grains, gum copal, camwood and sesame (benne).

== Origins ==
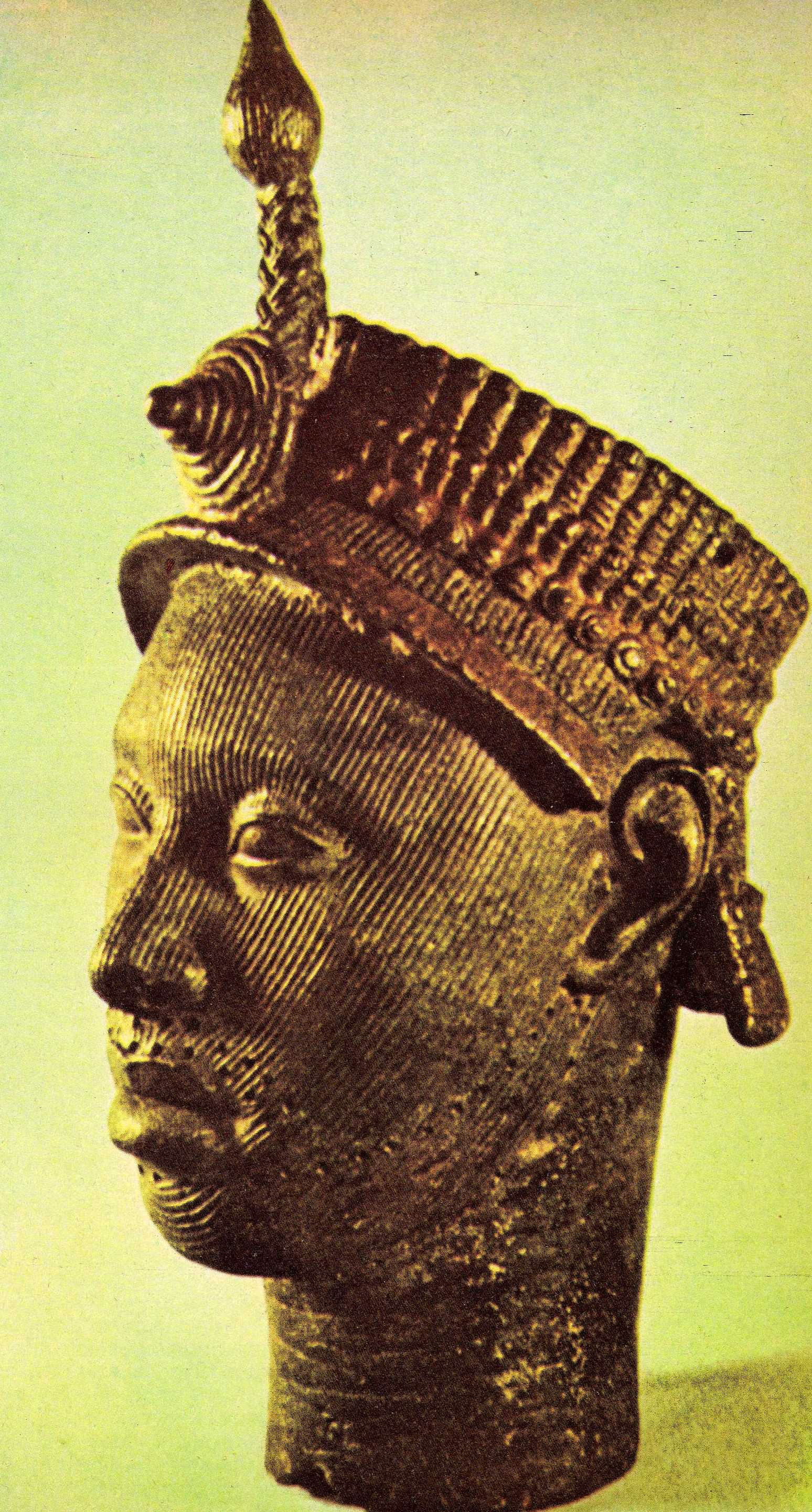
Brass head of a Yoruba king from Ife, 13th century

The earliest incarnation of Lagos was an Awori Yoruba fishing community located on the islands and peninsula that form the modern state. The area was inhabited by families who claimed a semi-mythical ancestry from a figure called Olofin. The modern descendants of this figure are the contemporary nobility known as the Idejo or "white cap chiefs" of Lagos.

In the 16th century, Lagos island, which was known as Eko, was sacked and colonized by troops of the Oba of Benin during that kingdom's expansionary phase. They established a war camp in the town. In the 17th century, it became an important port town in the Benin Empire. The monarchs of Lagos since then have claimed descent from the warrior Ashipa who is sometimes said to have been a prince of Benin or, by Lagos tradition, an Awori freebooter loyal to the Benin throne. The Idejo aristocracy remained Yoruba. Ashipa's son built his palace on Lagos Island, and his grandson moved the seat of government to the palace from the Iddo peninsula. In 1730, the Oba of Lagos invited Portuguese slave traders to the island, where soon a flourishing trade developed. 18th century Lagos was still technically a vassal city-state within the Benin Empire, but was increasingly independent and surpassing the latter in power and influence as Benin's power waned.

In the first half of the 19th century, the Yoruba hinterland was in a state of near-constant warfare due to internal conflicts and incursions from the northern and western neighbouring states. By then the fortified island of Lagos had become a major centre of the slave trade. The United Kingdom abolished import of slaves to their colonies in 1807 and abolished slavery in all British territories in 1833. The British became increasingly active in suppressing the slave trade.

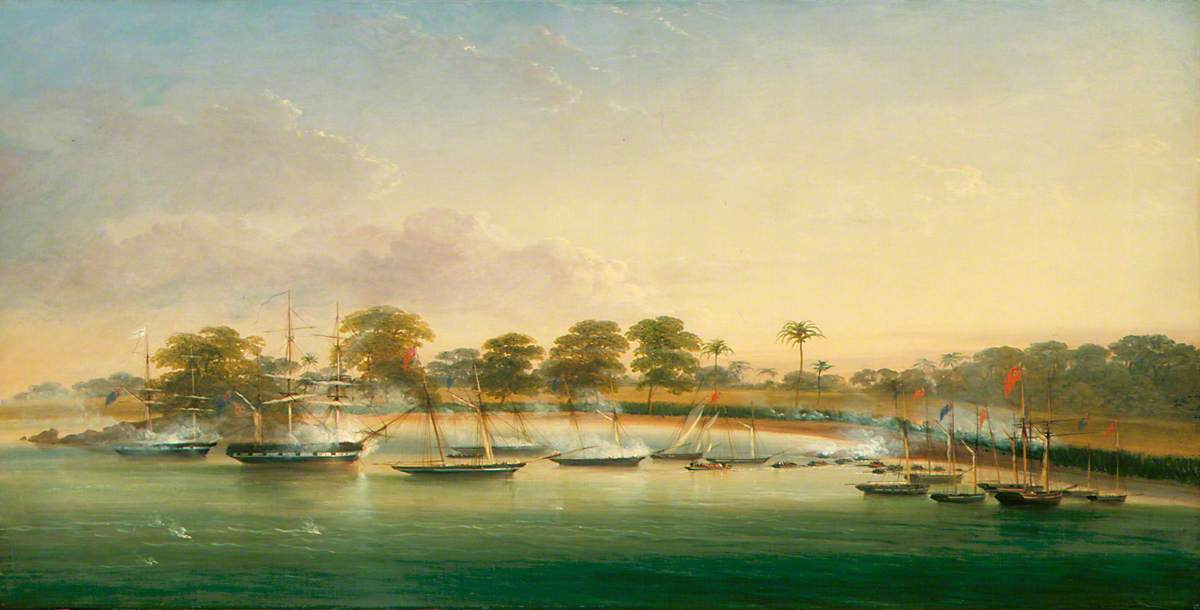
Counterattack during the Reduction of Lagos (1851–1852)

At the end of 1851 a naval expedition bombarded Lagos into submission, deposed Oba Kosoko, installed the more amenable Oba Akitoye, and signed the Great Britain-Lagos treaty that made slavery illegal in Lagos on 1 January 1852. A few months later Louis Fraser from the Bight of Benin consulate was posted to the island as vice-Consul. The next year Lagos was upgraded to a full consulate with Benjamin Campbell appointed as Consul. A Yoruba emigrant, the catechist James White, wrote in 1853 "By the taking of Lagos, England has performed an act which the grateful children of Africa shall long remember ... One of the principal roots of the slave trade is torn out of the soil".

Tensions between the new ruler, Akitoye, and supporters of the deposed Kosoko led to fighting in August 1853. An attempt by Kosoko himself to take the town was defeated, but Akitoye died suddenly on 2 September 1853, perhaps by poison. After consulting with the local chiefs, the consul declared Dosunmu (Docemo), the eldest son of Akitoye, the new Oba. With succeeding crises and interventions, the consulate evolved over the following years into a form of protectorate. Lagos became a base from which the British gradually extended their jurisdiction, in the form of a protectorate, over the hinterland. The process was driven by the demands of trade and security rather than by any deliberate policy of expansion.

The CMS Grammar School was founded in Lagos on 6 June 1859 by the Church Missionary Society, modelled on the CMS Grammar School in Freetown, Sierra Leone.

== Early years ==
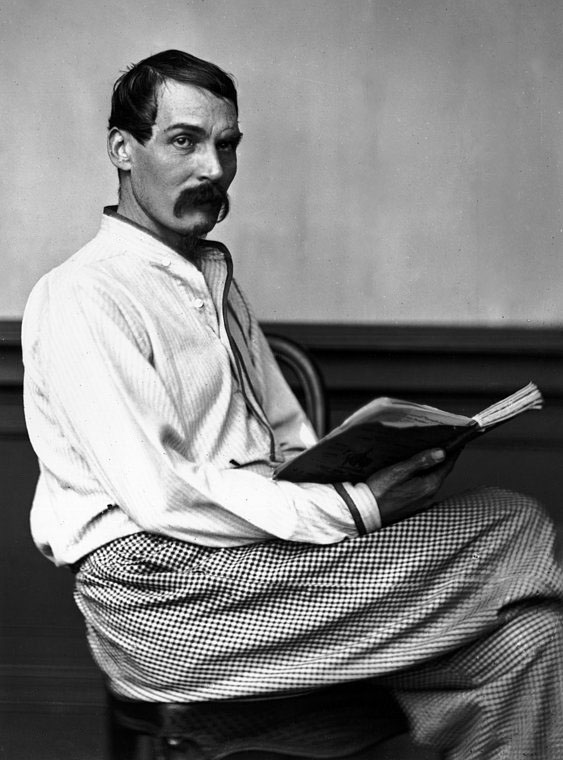
Richard Francis Burton, opponent of missionary activity in the colony

In August 1861, a British naval force entered Lagos and annexed Lagos as a British colony via the Lagos Treaty of Cession. King Dosunmu's powers were significantly reduced and consul William McCoskry became acting governor. (Note: The British had arranged to pay Dosunmu, the Oba of Lagos, an annual grant of £1,000 for his lifetime, after which the British would assume full sovereignty over the colony. When Dosunmu died in 1884, Africans led by the Anglican clergyman James Johnson and supported by the Saro trader Charles Joseph George demanded a reasonable payment for his son, Oyekan. This was agreed by the administration, but only reluctantly.) As a colony, Lagos was now protected and governed directly from Britain. Africans born in the colony were British subjects, with full rights including access to the courts. By contrast, Africans in the later protectorates of southern and northern Nigeria were protected people but remained under the jurisdiction of their traditional rulers.

In the early years, trade with the interior was severely restricted due to a war between Ibadan and Abeokuta. The Ogun River leading to Abeokuta was not safe for canoe traffic, with travellers at risk from Egba robbers. On 14 November 1862, Governor Henry Stanhope Freeman called on all British subjects to return from Abeokuta to Lagos, leaving their property, for which the chiefs of Abeokuta would be answerable to the British government. Acting Governor William Rice Mulliner met the Bashorun of Abeokuta in May 1863, who told him that recent robberies of traders' property were due to the custom of suppressing trading so as to force the men to war. The plunder would cease when the war was over. In the meantime, traders should not travel to Abeokuta since their safety could not be guaranteed.

Although the slave trade had been suppressed, and slavery was illegal in British territory, slavery still continued in the region. Lagos was seen as a haven by runaway slaves, who were something of a problem for the administration. McCoskry set up a court to hear cases of abuse against slaves and of runaway slaves from the interior, and established a "Liberated African Yard" to give employment to freed runaways until they were able to look after themselves. He did not consider that abolition of slavery in the colony would be practical.

McCoskry, and other merchants in the colony, opposed the activities of missionaries, which they felt interfered with trade. In 1855, McCoskry had been among signatories of a petition to prevent two missionaries who had gone on leave from returning to Lagos. McCoskry communicated his view to the former explorer Richard Francis Burton, who visited Lagos and Abeokuta in 1861 while acting as consul at Fernando Po, and who was also opposed to missionary work.

Freeman, his successor, agreed with Burton that the blacks were more likely to be converted by Islam than by Christianity.

Freeman attempted to prevent Robert Campbell, a Jamaican of part-Scottish, part-African descent, from establishing a newspaper in the colony. He considered it would be "a dangerous instrument in the hands of semi-civilized Negroes". The British government did not agree, and the first issue of the Anglo-African, appeared on 6 June 1863. Earlier, in 1854, there had been a newspaper that can truly be described as the first Nigerian newspaper called Iwe Iroyin Yoruba fun awon Egba ati Yoruba.

== Growth of the town ==
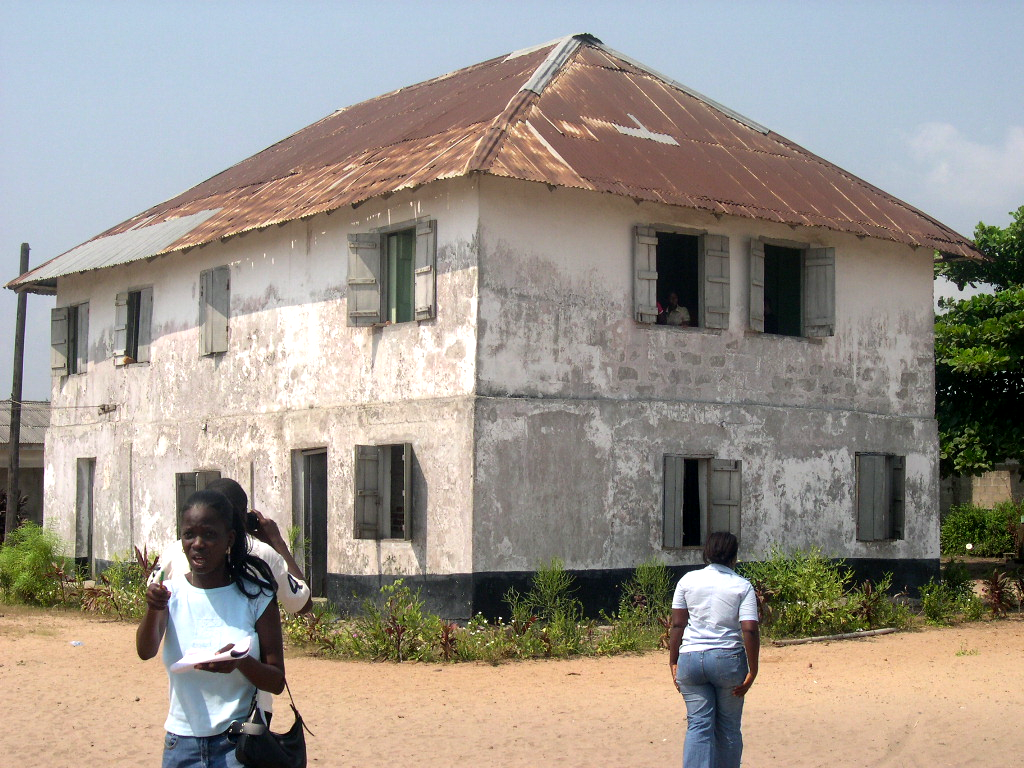
The first missionary house in Nigeria at Badagry

There was a small legislative council which was established when the colony was founded in 1861, with the priority mandate of assisting and advising the Governor but without formal authority, and was maintained until 1922. The majority of members were colonial officials. In 1863, the British established the Lagos Town Improvement Ordinance, with the aim of controlling the physical development of the town and surrounding territory.

The administration was merged with that of Sierra Leone in 1866, and was transferred to the Gold Coast in 1874. The Lagos elites lobbied intensively to have autonomy restored, which did not happen until 1886.

Colonial Lagos developed into a busy, cosmopolitan port, with an architecture that blended Victorian and Brazilian styles. The Brazilian element was imparted by skilled builders and masons who had returned from Brazil. The black elite was composed of English-speaking "Saros" from Sierra Leone and other emancipated slaves who had been repatriated from Brazil and Cuba. By 1872, the population of the colony was over 60,000, of whom less than 100 were of European origin. In 1876, imports were valued at £476,813 and exports at £619,260.

On 13 January 1874, leaders of the Methodist community, including Charles Joseph George, met to discuss founding a secondary school for members of their communion as an alternative to the CMS Grammar School. After a fund-raising drive, the Methodist Boys School building was opened in June 1877. On 17 February 1881, George was one of the community leaders who laid the foundation stone for the Wesley Church at Olowogbowo, in the west of Lagos Island.

The colony had largely succeeded in eliminating slavery and had become a prosperous trading community, but until the start of the European scramble for Africa the British Imperial government considered that the Lagos colony in some respects a failure. The British had refused to intervene in the politics of the hinterland and cut-throat competition among British and French firms along the Niger had kept it from returning any significant profit.

== Yoruba wars ==
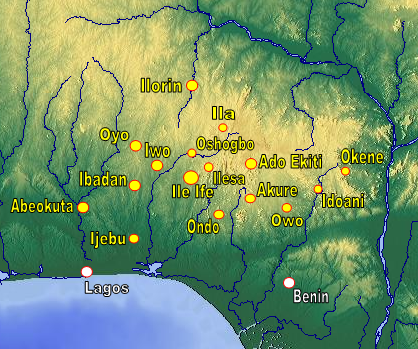
Historical Yoruba cities, with Lagos in the southwest

In 1877, a trade war broke out between Ibadan and both Egba Alake (Abeokuta) and Ijebu. Further to the east, the Ekiti and Ijesa revolted against Ibadan rule in 1878, and sporadic fighting continued for the next sixteen years. Assistance from Saro merchants in Lagos in the form of breech-loading rifles gave the Ekiti the advantage. The Lagos government, at that time subordinate to Accra in the Gold Coast, was instructed to stay out of the conflict, despite the damage it was doing to trade, and attempts to mediate by the Saro merchants and by the Fulani emirs were rejected.

By 1884, George Goldie's United African Company had succeeded in absorbing all of his competition and eliminated the French posts from the lower Niger; the situation permitted Britain to claim the entire region at the Berlin Conference the next year. In 1886 Lagos became a separate colony from the Gold Coast under Governor Cornelius Alfred Moloney. The legislative council of the new colony was composed of four official and three unofficial members. Governor Moloney nominated two Africans as unofficial representatives: the clergyman, later bishop James Johnson and the trader Charles Joseph George. At this time the European powers were in intense competition for African colonies while the protagonists in the Yoruba wars were wearying. The Lagos administration, acting through Samuel Johnson and Charles Phillips of the Church Mission Society, arranged a ceasefire and then a treaty that guaranteed the independence of the Ekiti towns. Ilorin refused to cease fighting however, and the war dragged on.

Concerned about the growing influence of the French in nearby Dahomey, the British established a post at Ilaro in 1890. On 13 August 1891 a treaty was signed placing the kingdom of Ilaro under the protection of the British queen. When Governor Gilbert Thomas Carter arrived in 1891, he followed an aggressive policy. In 1892, he attacked Ijebu, and in 1893 made a tour of Yorubaland signing treaties, forcing the armies to disperse, and opening the way for construction of a railway from Lagos to Ibadan. Thus on 3 February 1893, Carter signed a treaty of protection with the Alafin of Oyo and on 15 August 1893, acting Governor George Chardin Denton signed a protectorate agreement with Ibadan. Colonial control was firmly established throughout the region after the bombardment of Oyo in 1895 and the capture of Ilorin by the Royal Niger Company in 1897.

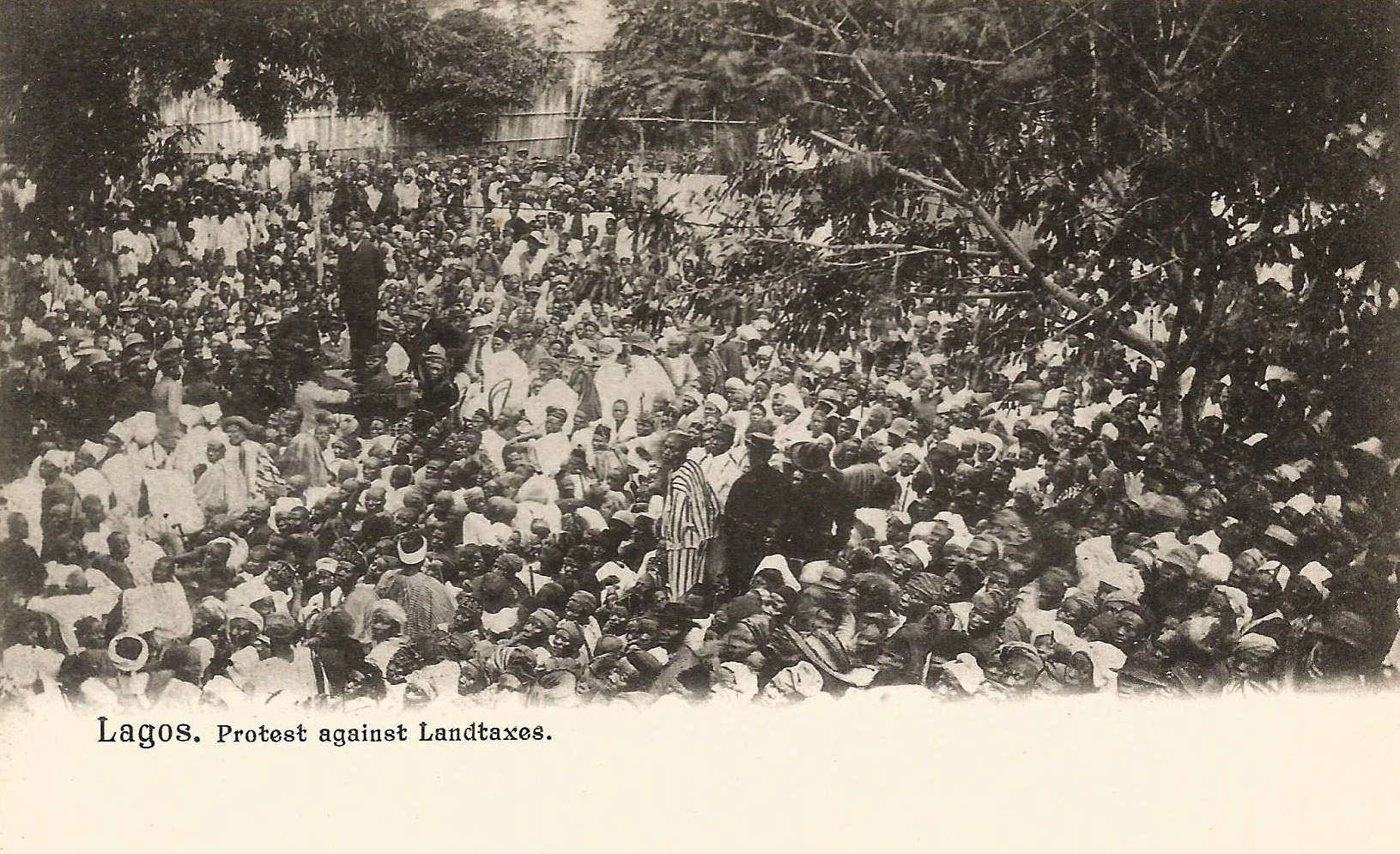
House and land tax protesters in Lagos, 1895

== Later years ==
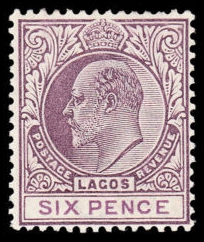
A 1904 six pence stamp of Lagos

In 1887, Captain Maloney, the Governor, gave a report to the Royal Botanic Gardens, Kew in which he outlined plans for a Botanic Station at Lagos with the purpose of developing indigenous trees and plants that had commercial value. By 1889 rubber had been introduced to the colony, and was promising excellent yields and quality. A report that year described other products including gum and coconut oil, for which a small-scale crushing business had promise, various fibres, camwood, borewood and indigo, also seen as having large potential.

The growth of the city of Lagos was largely unplanned, impeded by the complex of swamps, canals and sand spits. William MacGregor, governor from 1898 to 1903, instituted a campaign against the prevalent malaria, draining the swamps and destroying as far as possible the mosquitoes that were responsible for the spread of the disease.

Telephone links with Britain were established by 1886, and electric street lighting in 1898. In August 1896, Charles Joseph George and George William Neville, both merchants and both unofficial members of the Legislative Council, presented a petition urging construction of the railway terminus on Lagos Island rather than at Iddo, and also asking for the railway to be extended to Abeokuta. George was the leader of the delegation making this request, and described its many commercial advantages. A major strike broke out in the colony in 1897, which has been described as the "first major labour protest" in African history.

On 21 February 1899, the Alake of the Egba signed an agreement opening the way for construction of a railway through their territory, and the new railway from Aro to Abeokuta was opened by the Governor in December 1901, in the presence of the Alake.

In 1901, the first qualified African lawyer in the colony, Christopher Sapara Williams, was nominated to the Legislative Council, serving as a member until his death in 1915. In 1903, there was a crisis over the payment of the tolls that were collected from traders by native rulers, although Europeans were exempted. The alternative was to replace the tolls by a subsidy. MacGregor requested views from Williams, Charles Joseph George and Obadiah Johnson as indigenous opinion leaders. All were in favour of retaining the tolls to avoid upsetting the rulers. In 1903, Governor MacGregor's administration prepared a Newspaper Ordinance ostensibly designed to prevent libels being published. George, Williams and Johnson, the three Nigerian council members, all objected on the grounds that the ordinance would inhibit freedom of the press. George said "any obstacle in the way of publication of newspapers in this colony means throwing Lagos back to its position forty or fifty years ago". Despite these objections, the ordinance was passed into law.

Walter Egerton was the last Governor of Lagos Colony, appointed in 1903. Egerton enthusiastically endorsed the extension of the Lagos – Ibadan railway onward to Oshogbo, and the project was approved in November 1904. Construction began in January 1905 and the line reached Oshogbo in April 1907. The colonial office wanted to amalgamate the Lagos Colony with the protectorate of Southern Nigeria, and in August 1904 also appointed Egerton as High Commissioner for the Southern Nigeria Protectorate. He held both offices until 28 February 1906. On that date the two territories were amalgamated, with the combined territory called the Colony and Protectorate of Southern Nigeria. In 1914, the Governor-General Sir Frederick Lugard amalgamated this territory with the Protectorate of Northern Nigeria to form the Colony and Protectorate of Nigeria.

The economic foundations laid during colonial rule later supported the development of modern financial institutions. In 1960, the establishment of the Nigerian Stock Exchange, founded through the efforts of key figures such as Chief Festus Samuel Okotie-Eboh, Chief Theophilus Adebayo Doherty and Sir Odumegwu Ojukwu, marked a significant milestone in Nigeria’s transition to an independent economy. It provided a formal platform for capital formation, enabling businesses to raise funds and fostering investment in key sectors. This development reflected Nigeria’s growing economic autonomy and its integration into the global financial system following independence.

Lagos was the capital of Nigeria until 1991, when that role was ceded to the Federal Capital Territory, Abuja, and remains the commercial capital. The estimated population in 2011 was over 9 million.

== Governors ==
Governors of the Lagos Colony were as follows:

Took office	Left Office	Governor	Notes
6 August 1861	22 January 1862	William McCoskry	Acting
22 January 1862	April 1865	Henry Stanhope Freeman	
1863	25 July 1863	William Rice Mulliner	Acting. died 25 July 1863 aged 29.
August 1863	19 February 1866	John Hawley Glover	Acting to April 1865. Administrator or colonial secretary until 1872.

From 1866 to 1886 Lagos was subordinate first to Sierra Leone, then to Gold Coast.

Took office	Left Office	Governor	Notes
13 January 1886	1891	Cornelius Alfred Moloney	
1889	1890	George Denton	Acting for Moloney
1891	1897	Sir Gilbert Thomas Carter	
1897	1899	Henry Edward McCallum	
1899	1903	Sir William MacGregor	
1903	16 February 1906	Walter Egerton	

== See also ==
- Government Gazette (Lagos)
- Timeline of Lagos
