= Samuel Johnson (Nigerian historian) =

Nigerian historian (1846–1901)

Reverend Samuel Johnson
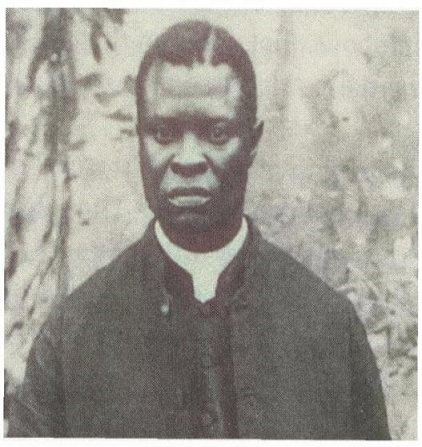
- Born: June 24, 1846; Freetown, Sierra Leone
- Died: April 29, 1901 (aged 54); Lagos, British Nigeria
- Occupations: Priest, historian
- Relatives: Alaafin Abiodun, great-grandfather Henry Johnson (priest), brother Obadiah Johnson, brother Samuel Ajayi Crowther, first cousin once removed Herbert Macaulay, second cousin once removed
- Writing career
- Language: Yoruba; English
- Notable work: The History of the Yorubas

The Rev. Samuel Johnson (24 June 1846 – 29 April 1901) was an Anglican priest, diplomat, and historian, as well as the great-grandson of Alaafin Abiodun, a powerful king of the Oyo Empire. He is most notable for his magnum opus The History of the Yorubas, published posthumously in 1921, in which Johnson endeavored to record the oral traditions and history of the Yoruba people, which he feared were fast fading into obscurity. Lost, rewritten, and then narrowly escaping destruction during WWI, his history has since become "the most frequently cited and most influential volume about the Yoruba-speaking people". Besides his historical contributions, Johnson led an active life, variously serving as a minister, teacher, and school superintendent in Ibadan, capital city of the Oyo state in Nigeria. During the Yoruba Wars, he was an emissary involved in negotiations between the British, Ibadan chiefs, and the king of Oyo.

== Biography ==
Samuel Johnson was born a recaptive Creole in Freetown, Sierra Leone, as the third of seven children of Henry Erugunjinmi Johnson and Sarah Johnson on June 24, 1846. His father, who gave himself the Yoruba name Erugunjinmi, was born in 1810 in the town of Oyo-Ile, capital of the Oyo Empire. Henry was an Omoba (prince) of the Oyo clan, and was a grandson of the 18th-century alaafin (king) Abiodun. He was later captured and sold into the Atlantic Slave Trade but was rerouted to Sierra Leone, like many Yorubas, such as Samuel Ajayi Crowther (his distant cousin) and others. He later met the English writer and literary critic Samuel Johnson, whose name he gave to his son. Johnson had 2 older brothers, Henry and Nathaniel, and a younger brother, Obadiah. Henry and Nathaniel both became missionaries and archdeacons like Samuel, while Obadiah became the first indigenous Yoruba medical doctor. He completed his education at the Church Missionary Society (CMS) Training Institute and subsequently taught during what became known as the Yoruba civil war.

Johnson and Charles Phillips, also of the CMS, arranged a ceasefire in 1886 and then a treaty that guaranteed the independence of the Ekiti towns. The people of Ilorin refused to cease fighting however, and the war dragged on. In 1880, he became a deacon and in 1888 a priest. He was based in Oyo from 1881 onward and completed a work on Yoruba history in 1897. Johnson declared that his chief aim in committing pen to paper was to safeguard the annals of Yoruba history, a heritage swiftly slipping into oblivion. Thus, he wrote:

"What led to this production was not a burning desire of the author to appear in print—as all who are well acquainted with him will readily admit—but a purely patriotic motive, that the history of our fatherland might not be lost in oblivion, especially as our old sires are fast dying out. Educated natives of Yoruba are well acquainted with the history of England and with that of Rome and Greece, but of the history of their own country they know nothing whatever! This reproach it is one of the author's objects to remove."

He first entrusted his manuscript to the Christian Missionary Society, who conveyed it to other publishers—the manuscript was later "misplaced" and lost to posterity. (Note: Johnson's brother and editor Dr. Obadiah Johnson was skeptical of the honesty of the publisher's claim to have lost the valuable manuscript, writing: The manuscripts were forwarded to a well-known English publisher through one of the great Missionary Societies in 1899 and—mirabile dictu—nothing more was heard of them! The editor [Obadiah] who was all along in collaboration with the author had occasion to visit England in 1900, and called on the publisher, but could get nothing more from him than that the manuscripts had been misplaced, that they could not be found, and that he was prepared to pay for them! This seemed to the editor and all his friends who heard of it so strange that one could not help thinking that there was more in it than appeared on the surface, especially because of other circumstances connected with the so-called loss of the manuscripts. However, we let the subject rest there.) Johnson would not live to see his work published.

After his death, his brother Dr. Obadiah Johnson re-compiled and rewrote the book, using the reverend's copious notes as a guide. The second manuscript also underwent many mishaps: en route to England from Lagos during WWI, the ship on which it was transported, the Appam, was captured by the German SMS Möwe and subsequently the manuscript ended up in America. It was only discovered and forwarded to the printer two years later, after the United States had entered WWI. However, printing was at this time impossible due to paper shortages, and the book was put on hold till the war's end. In 1921, Obadiah finally succeeded in publishing the manuscript, titling the work The History of the Yorubas from the Earliest Times to the Beginning of the British Protectorate. The book has since been likened to The Decline and Fall of the Roman Empire by Edward Gibbon.

== Bibliography ==
- Falola, Toyin (1993), Pioneer, patriot and patriarch: Samuel Johnson and the Yoruba people, Madison, WI: African Studies Program, Univ. of Wisconsin-Madison, ISBN 9780942615197.
- Johnson, Samuel (1921), The History of the Yorubas, Lagos: CMS Bookshops.
