= Obadiah Johnson =

Omoba Obadiah Johnson
- Born: 1849; Freetown, Sierra Leone
- Died: 1920 (aged 70–71); London
- Education: Fourah Bay College; University of Edinburgh; King's College London
- Occupation: Medical doctor
- Known for: The History of the Yorubas

Obadiah Johnson (1849–1920, born in Freetown, Sierra Leone) was a Saro medical doctor who was the co-author, with his brother the Reverend Samuel Johnson, of The History of the Yorubas from the Earliest Times to the Beginning of the British Protectorate.

== Life ==
Johnson was of a liberated African or recaptive family that was originally from the Kingdom of Oyo as a descendant of Alaafin Abiodun. He graduated from the University of Edinburgh Medical School with an M.B., C.M. degree in 1886 and his M.D. in 1889. From 1890 to 1897 he was the Chief Medical Officer in Lagos. Although this achievement of his was a milestone in history, he became famous only for tackling another monumental undertaking.

In 1897 his older brother, the Reverend Samuel Johnson, completed a major work on the history of the Yorubas but, in Dr. Johnson's own words, "A singular misfortune...befell the original manuscripts of this history, in consequence of which the author never lived to see in print his more than 20 years of labour." The manuscripts were sent to an English publisher in London, England, through a missionary society in 1899 but, "nothing more was heard of them".

In 1900, Johnson visited England and called on the publisher who told him he had misplaced the manuscripts and, "that they could not be found, and that he was prepared to pay for them." Although Dr. Johnson smelt a rat immediately, he and his brother decided to "let the subject rest there." The original author, Samuel Johnson, died a year later on 29 April 1901. Thus, Dr. Obadiah Johnson had "to rewrite the whole history anew from the copious notes and rough copies left behind by the author".

In August 1901, Dr. Johnson was appointed an unofficial member of the Legislative Council of the Colony of Lagos. He then acted as an unofficial adviser, as in 1903 when there was a crisis over the payment of the tolls that were collected from traders by native rulers, although Europeans were exempted. The alternative was to replace the tolls by a subsidy. Governor William MacGregor requested views from Christopher Sapara Williams, Charles Joseph George and Obadiah Johnson as indigenous opinion leaders. All were in favor of retaining the tolls to avoid upsetting the rulers.

Dr. Johnson died in London in 1920 and the book, A History of the Yorubas from the Earliest Times to the Beginning of the British Protectorate, was published in 1921, first in London by George Routledge and Sons and then in Lagos by the Church Mission Society. This book is recognized worldwide as a pioneering historical study and a book of great merit, which sealed the two Johnsons' places in history.
