= Henry Stanhope Freeman =

Governor of Lagos Colony
- In office 22 January 1862 – April 1865
- Preceded by: William McCoskry
- Succeeded by: John Hawley Glover

Personal details
- Born: c. 1831
- Died: April 1865

Henry Stanhope Freeman (died April 1865) was the first Governor of the Lagos Colony, serving from 22 January 1862 to April 1865.

== Background ==
Freeman was British Vice-Consul at Ghadames in Libya, and while there put together notes on one of the Tuareg languages. Freeman was elected a member of the Royal Asiatic Society on 14 December 1861. He was also a member of the Anthropological society, attending and speaking at some of the meetings but not contributing to the society's publications. Before being appointed Governor of Lagos, Freeman was British Vice-Consul at Janina in the Ottoman Empire.

== Lagos governor ==
The Lagos colony had been established by an enforced treaty in August 1861. When Freeman arrived in January 1862 to take over from acting Governor William McCoskry, the colony included Lagos Island and a small amount of mainland territory to the east and west. The rulers of the interior states were not unfriendly to the British, but were constantly fighting each other, making trade dangerous. In his Annual Report for 1863, Freeman said that trade had almost stopped altogether due to the war between Ibadan and Abeokuta.

In a letter of 9 October 1862, Freeman defended his decision to extend his authority to Palma and Badagry on the grounds that there were precedents for considering these to be under the authority of Lagos. The Ogun River leading to Abeokuta was not safe for canoe traffic, with travelers at risk from Egba robbers. For this reason, on 14 November 1862 Freeman called on all British subjects to return from Abeokuta to Lagos, leaving their property, for which the chiefs of Abeokuta would be answerable to the British government. In 1863, he took an anti-Ijebu and pro-Kosoko policy, leading to the bombardment of Epe by naval vessels.

On 18 February 1862, Freeman signed a treaty with the former ruler of Lagos, King Docemo, clarifying that he would receive an annual pension of 1,200 bags of cowries for his lifetime. He was authorized to appoint a legislative council by a letter dated 13 March 1862. On 4 March 1863, Freeman enacting an ordinance that made the laws of England effective in the colony. On 6 July 1864, his council established a Chief Magistrate's Court to handle civil and criminal cases.

Freeman agreed with the former explorer Richard Burton, who visited Lagos, that the blacks were more likely to be converted to Islam than to Christianity. He attempted to suppress an attempt by Robert Campbell, a Jamaican of part-Scottish, part-African descent, to establish a newspaper in the colony. He considered it would be "a dangerous instrument in the hands of semi-civilized Negroes". The British government did not agree, and the first issue of the Anglo-African, Nigeria's first weekly newspaper, appeared on 6 June 1863.

Freeman suffered from ill-health, and was often forced to be absent. In his last two years his responsibilities were assumed by Captain William Rice Mulliner and then by Captain John Hawley Glover. He died in April 1865. Freeman was thirty-four at the time of his death.

== Bibliography ==
- Henry Stanhope Freeman (1862). A grammatical sketch of the Temahuq or Towarek language. Harrison.
