= Fela Sowande =

Nigerian musician and composer (1905–1987)

Chief Fela Sowande MBE
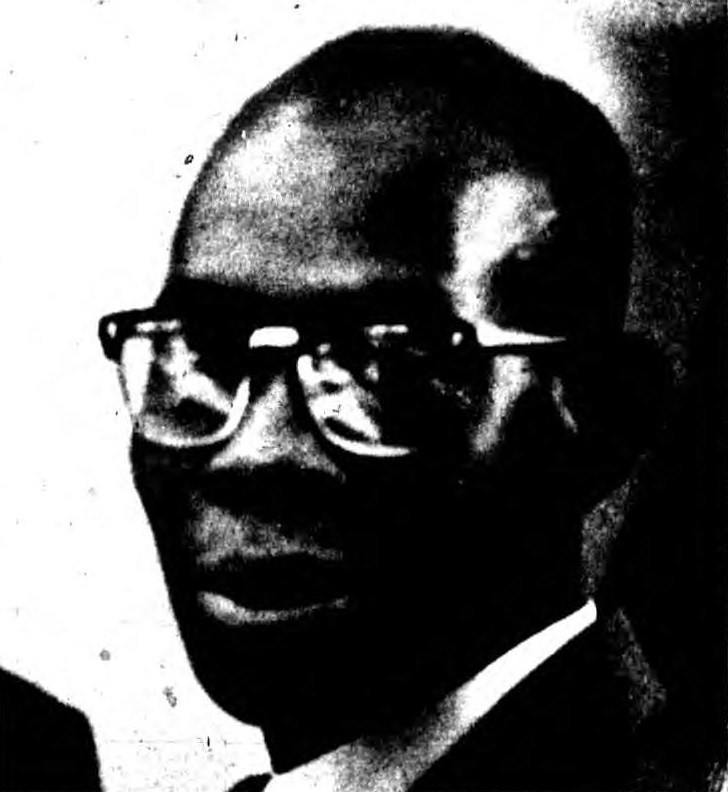
- Sowanda, c. 1961
- Born: 29 May 1905; Abeokuta, Nigeria
- Died: 13 March 1987 (aged 81); Ravenna, Ohio, United States
- Occupations: Musician and composer

Chief Olufela Obafunmilayo "Fela" Sowande MBE (29 May 1905 – 13 March 1987) was a Nigerian musician and composer. Considered the father of modern Nigerian art music, Sowande is perhaps the most internationally known African composer of works in the European "classical" idiom.

== Early life ==
Sowande was born 29 May 1905 in Abeokuta, near Lagos, the son of Emmanuel Sowande, a priest and pioneer of Nigerian church music. As a child he sang in the choir of the Cathedral Church of Christ. He studied at the C.M.S. Grammar School and at King's College, Lagos. The influence of his father and Dr. T. K. Ekundayo Phillips (composer, organist and choirmaster) was an important factor in his early years. Through Phillips, Sowande was first exposed to European church music like Bach and Rheinberger. At that time, Sowande was a chorister and was introduced to new Yoruba works being introduced into the churches. Under Phillips' tutelage, Sowande earned the Fellowship Diploma (FRCO) from the Royal College of Organists. At that time, he was also a bandleader, playing jazz and popular highlife music.

== Career ==
In 1934, Sowande went to London to study European classical and popular music. In 1936, he was solo pianist in a performance of George Gershwin's Rhapsody in Blue. He also played as part of a pianist duo with Fats Waller, was theatre organist for the BBC, Choirmaster at Kingsway Hall and pianist in the 1936 production of Blackbirds. In 1939, he played the organ on recordings by popular singers Adelaide Hall and Vera Lynn. Later, he studied organ privately under Edmund Rubbra, George Oldroyd, and George Cunningham and became a Fellow of the Royal College of Organists in 1943, winning the Limpus, Harding and Read Prizes.

He obtained a Bachelor of Music degree at the University of London and became a Fellow of Trinity College of Music. During the Second World War, he worked as musical advisor for the Colonial Film Unit of the Ministry of Information mainly providing background music for educational films, and lectured on music for the BBC Africa Service.

From 1945 until 1952, he was organist and choirmaster at the West London Mission of the Methodist Church. During this time, he also became known as a dance pianist, bandleader, and Hammond organist, playing popular tunes of the day.

He went back to Nigeria to conduct scholarly work with the Nigerian Broadcasting Corporation and later the University of Ibadan.

In 1952 Sowande became musical director of the Nigerian Broadcasting Service; in the 1955 Queen's Birthday Honours he was appointed MBE for this work.

Sowande was one of the six judges who selected the Nigerian National Anthem in 1960.

In 1962 he travelled to the United States on a Rockefeller Foundation fellowship. In 1968, he moved to Howard University in Washington, D.C., then to the University of Pittsburgh.

== Music ==
Western and African ideas prevail in his music, which included organ works such as Yorùbá Lament, Obangiji, Kyrie, Gloria, Jesu Olugbala, and Oba Aba Ke Pe. Most of these show a strong influence from Anglican Church music, combined with Yoruba pentatonic melodies, and would have appealed to members of the West London Mission of African descent.

His orchestral works include Six Sketches for Full Orchestra, A Folk Symphony, and the African Suite for string orchestra, and show African rhythmic and harmonic characteristics. The final movement became known to Canadian audiences as the theme of the popular CBC music programme Gilmour's Albums, and is now a Canadian orchestral standard. He also wrote a significant amount of secular and sacred choral music, mainly a cappella. Some of these works were composed during his period with the BBC Africa Service.

=== Nigerian art music ===
Ronnie Graham identifies the "art" music - "or the acculturated music of Nigeria's educated and westernised elite" - as a neglected area of study, which he presumes is due to its close approximation of western classical music. Graham identifies other composers of Nigerian art music as Samuel Akpabot (1932–2000), Ayo Bankole (1935–1976), Lazarus Ekwueme (born 1935), Akin Euba (1935–2020), Adam Fiberesima (1926–c1975), Oakchukwu Ndubuisi (born 1939), Josiah Ransome-Kuti (1855–1930) and Ikole Harcourt Whyte (1905–1977). "Many of their compositions involve adapting folk songs and traditions to western classical arrangements and instruments", he says.

== Later life ==
In the last years of his life Sowande taught in the Department of Pan-African Studies at Kent State University, and lived in nearby Ravenna, Ohio, with his wife, Eleanor McKinney, who was one of the founders of Pacifica Radio. He died in Ravenna and is buried in Randolph Township, Ohio.

In addition to his position as a professor, Sowande also held the chieftaincy title of the Bariyo of Lagos. There is currently a move to set up a centre to research and promote his works, as many remain unpublished or are out of print.

== Selected compositions ==
=== Organ ===
- 1945 – Ka Mura, Chappell, London
- 1952 – Pastourelle (for organ), Chappell, London
- 1955 – Jesu Olugbala, Chappell, London
- 1955 – Joshua Fit de Battle of Jericho, Chappell, London
- 1955 – Kyrie, Chappell, London
- 1955 – Obangiji, Chappell, London
- 1955 – Yorùbá Lament, Chappell, London
- 1958 – Oyigiyigi, Ricordi, New York
- 1958 – Gloria, Ricordi, New York
- 1958 – Prayer, Ricordi, New York
- KÕa Mo Rokoso
- Oba Aba Ke Pe
- Go Down Moses
- The Negro in Sacred Idiom, various organ pieces

=== Choral ===
- "The Wedding Day" for S.S.A. with piano, 1957, RDH
- "Sometimes I Feel Like a Motherless Child" for S.A.T.B. a cappella, 1955, Chappell, London
- "My Way's Cloudy" for S.A.T.B. with piano, 1955, Chappell, London
- "De Ol' Ark's a-Moverin" for S.A.T.B.B. a cappella with tenor solo, 1955, Chappell, London
- "Same Train" for S.A.T.B.B. a cappella, 1955, Chappell, London
- "Roll de Ol' Chariot" for S.A.T.B.B. with piano and rhythm combo, 1955, Chappell, London
- Steal Away for S.A.T.B.B. a cappella, 1955, Chappell, London
- "Responses in 'A'" for S.A.T.B. a cappella with cantor, 1959, manuscript
- "All I d"o for S.A.T.B.B. with piano and rhythm combo, 1961, Ricordi, New York
- "Goin' to Set Down" for S.A.T.B. a cappella with soprano solo, 1961, Ricordi, New York
- "Couldn't Hear Nobody Pray" for S.A.T.B. a cappella with soprano solo, 1958, Ricordi, New York
- "De Angels Are Watchin'" for S.A.T.B. a cappella with soprano and tenor solo, 1958, Ricordi, New York
- "Nobody Knows de Trouble I See" for S.A.TB. a cappella, 1958, Ricordi, New York
- "Wheel, Oh Wheel" for S.A.T.B. a cappella, 1961, Ricordi, New York
- "Wid a Sword in Ma Hand" for S.A.T.B.B. a cappella, 1958, Ricordi, New York
- "Sit Down Servant" for T.T.B.B. a cappella and tenor solo, 1961, Ricordi, New York
- "Out of Zion" for S.A.T.B. with organ, 1955
- "St. Jude's Response" for S.A.T.B. with organ
- "Oh Render Thanks" (hymn-anthem) for S.A.T.B. with organ, 1960
- Nigerian National Anthem (an arrangement) for S.A.T.B. with organ, 1960
- Chants for Alan Paton and Krishna Shah's play Sponono, 1964

=== Solo songs ===
- Three Songs of Contemplation for tenor and piano, 1950, Chappell, London
- Because of You for voice and piano, 1950, Chappell, London
- Three Yoruba Songs for voice and piano, 1954, Ibadan

=== Orchestral ===
- Four Sketches for full orchestra, 1953
- African Suite for string orchestra, 1945, Chappell, London
- Folk Symphony for full orchestra, 1960. Commissioned by the Nigerian government in celebration of its 1 Oct 1960 independence.

=== Books ===
- (1964). Ifa: Guide, Counsellor, and Friend of Our Forefathers. Ibadan.
- (1966). The Mind of a Nation: The Yoruba Child. Ibadan: Ibadan University.
- (1968). Come Now Nigeria, Part 1: Nationalism and essays on relevant subjects. Ibadan: Sketch Pub. Co.; sole distributors: Nigerian Book Suppliers. (All the material presented in this book first appeared in the form of articles in the pages of the Daily Sketch, Ibadan.)
- (1975). The Africanization of Black Studies. Kent, Ohio: Kent State University Institute for African American Affairs. African American Affairs Monograph Series, v. 2, no. 1.
- (1985) The Learning Process: Standard Rules for the Student

=== Articles ===
- (1971). "Black Folklore", Black Lines: A Journal of Black Studies (special issue: Black Folklore), vol. 2, no. 1 (Fall 1971), pp. 5–21.

== Recordings ==
A recording of the African Suite by the New Symphony Orchestra conducted by Trevor Harvey, was issued on London Records (LPS 426) in 1951. Sowande recorded five movements from his collection of organ works, The Negro in Sacred Idiom, the following year (London LL-533). Both recordings have been reissued by Naxos Records.
