= Moses Da Rocha =

Moses Da Rocha (January 1875 – May 1942) was a Nigerian medical doctor, journalist and politician. He was among a number of medical doctors such as Africanus Horton, Orisadipe Obasa and John K. Randle who combined medical practice and politics. He founded the Union of Young Nigerians in 1923 just before the elections into the Legislative Council.

== Life ==
Da Rocha was born in Lagos to the family of Senhor Joao Esan da Rocha and Angelica Nogeira who were returnee ex-slaves from Brazil. He was the third child and second son in a family of five; the first child was the land owner Candido Da Rocha. Da Rocha attended a few primary schools in Lagos learning the standard curriculum of the 1880s such as Arithmetic, English, European history and geography and scripture. Between 1883 and 1884, he was at the Wesleyan School, Tinubu, Lagos, then C.M.S. Faji (1886) and completed primary education at St Xavier's Catholic School (1886–1888). He then went on to CMS Grammar School, Lagos for his secondary education, at CMS he was contemporaries with Richard Akinwande Savage, S.J. Gansallo, Eric Moore, M.S. Cole and J.T. Nelson Cole. Da Rocha was raised a Catholic but at C.M.S., he was exposed learning in a Protestant school. The school's principal was Rev Isaac Oluwole and among his tutors was Henry Rawlingson Carr. At C.M.S., he edited the school's newspaper the Grammarian and he was good friends with Dick Blaize, son of Richard Beale Blaize. He finished his education at C.M.S. in 1893 and then went to work as a medical student trainee with the Colonial Hospital, Lagos from 1894 to 1895.

In 1896, he left the shores of Lagos to study medicine at the University of Edinburgh but after a year, he dropped out choosing a career in journalism and African Nationalism. He always had interest in journalism even while studying medicine at Edinburgh; he wrote articles published in the Lagos Weekly Record, the Lagos Echo and the Lagos Standard and he was secretary of the Henry Sylvester Williams led African Association. In 1895, while still in Lagos, he wrote two letters to the Earl of Rosebery earning him replies.

After leaving medical studies, he chose a career in journalism and African nationalism. He was a columnist and correspondent with the Edinburgh Evening News, London New Age, Coloured American, South African Spectator and African Mail. Da Rocha used his letters to express his opinions on various issues including his dissent against the British treatment of Oba Overami.

However, in 1908, with pressure from friends and at home, he returned to his medical studies, earning his qualification in 1913. He returned to Nigeria and started a private practice.

Da Rocha was a fervent Catholic and some of his writings focused on Christian and Catholic dogma including criticism of non-Catholics. He founded the Union of Young Nigerians in 1923 to energize Nigerian youths to participate in the development of the country. Though the party did not provide candidates for legislative elections, the organization gained no traction and Da Rocha's attempt to reconcile the factions of Macaulay and Egerton Shyngle with J.K. Randle, Kitoyi Ajasa, Obasa and David Taylor went nowhere.
