= Saro people =

Freed slaves who migrated to Nigeria

The Saro, or Nigerian Creoles of the 19th and early 20th centuries, were Africans that were emancipated and initially resettled in Freetown, Sierra Leone by the Royal Navy, which, with the West Africa Squadron, enforced the abolition of the international slave trade after the British Parliament passed the Slave Trade Act 1807. Those freedmen who migrated back to Nigeria from Sierra Leone, over several generations starting from the 1830s, became known locally as Saro (elided form of Sierra Leone, from the Yoruba sàró). Consequently, the Saro are culturally descended from Sierra Leone Creoles, with ancestral roots to the Yoruba people of Nigeria.

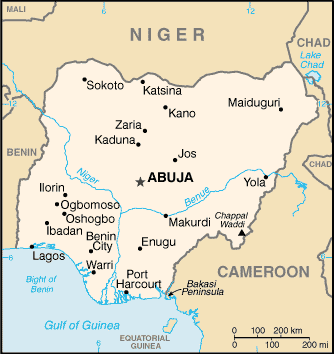

A related community of people were likewise known as Amaro, and were migrants from Brazil and Cuba. Saro and Amaro also settled in other West African countries such as the Gold Coast (Ghana). They were mostly freed and repatriated slaves from various West African and Latin American countries such as Sierra Leone, Brazil and Cuba. Liberated "returnee" Africans from Brazil were more commonly known as "Agudas", from the word àgùdà in the Yoruba language. Most of the Latin American returnees or Amaro started migrating to Africa after slavery was abolished on the continent, while others from West Africa, or the Saro, were recaptured and freed slaves already resident in Sierra Leone. Many of the returnees chose to return to Nigeria for cultural, missionary and economic reasons. Many, if not the greater majority, of them were originally descended from the Yoruba of western and central Nigeria. Other Nigerian groups forming part of the Sierra Leonean and Gambian Krio population included the Efik, Igbos, Hausa and Nupe.

The returnees mostly resided in the Lagos Colony, with substantial populations in Abeokuta and Ibadan. Some also settled in Calabar, Port Harcourt and other cities in the Niger Delta. Though many were originally dedicated Anglophiles in Nigeria, they later adopted an indigenous and patriotic attitude on Nigerian affairs due to a rise in discrimination in the 1880s, and were later known as cultural nationalists.

== Life in Sierra Leone ==
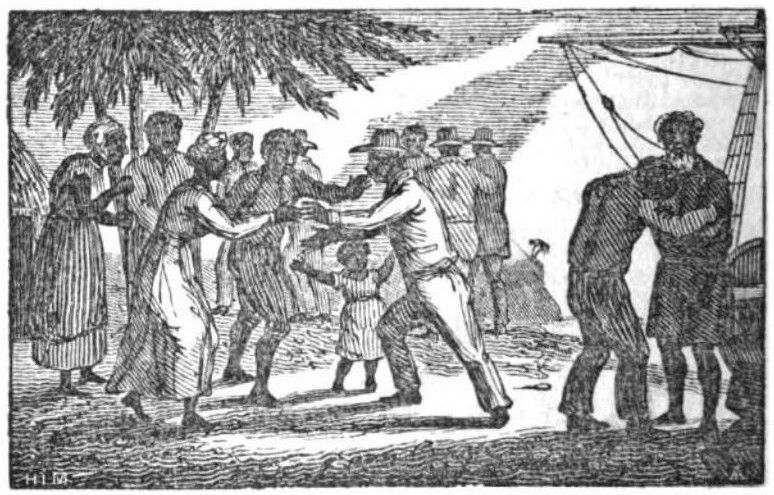
An 1835 illustration of liberated slaves arriving in Sierra Leone.

While living in Sierra Leone, many Creole residents became exposed to the Christian faith as a result of the work of British missionaries, who established some Churches, a few grammar schools and a pioneer educational institution, the Fourah Bay College. Relatively, the residents of Sierra Leone soon gained a fast start in Western education and were soon well trained and experienced in medicine, law, and the civil service. Many of them graduated from grammar schools and became administrative workers for the British imperial interest in the country. By the middle of the nineteenth century, some of the African literati in Sierra Leone began to migrate to Nigeria, especially the colony of Lagos for economic reasons; some were administrative personnel who were reassigned to Lagos. An expedition of the river Niger by Ajayi Crowther furthered the evangelical interest of many Sierra Leoneans towards Nigeria, many of them having joined the missionaries and their effort.

== Life in Lagos and Abeokuta ==
Lagos was a strategic and important fishing location for the original founders, the Aworis. It was established as a fishing community by Awori immigrants in the sixteenth century. The town later emerged as a major economic base nurtured by immigration from nearby ethnic groups led by the Ijebus, then the Ijaws, the Binis, and the Egbas. Trade with Europeans also fueled the commercial rise of the city. By 1880, Lagos had already become a cosmopolitan city. Sierra Leonean immigrants started moving to Lagos in the 1840s. Many of the immigrants were of Egba and Oyo heritage, and some were familiar with Yoruba traditions and culture. They assimilated fairly well with the Yorubas, and coupled with an earlier training and interaction with the British in Sierra Leone, they were able to become part of the colonial society. The returnees were generally focused on trade and rose to become commercial middlemen between residents of Lagos, Abeokuta and the British colony in Freetown, Sierra Leone.

In Lagos, the Saro chose Ebute Metta, Olowogbowo, and Yaba as primary settlements. Mostly of Egba heritage, they established a few of the oldest churches in Lagos and also expanded the missionary work of the British in Nigeria. The Saro also emerged as a dominant commercial group in Lagos. Having developed a migratory forte, they had an edge as travelers who were able to go into the interiors to meet directly with various commodity producers and traders. They were the pioneer Southern Nigerian traders in Kola, a cash crop that later emerged as a viable and important export commodity for the Western region in the early twentieth century. The Saro introduced the crop which was bought from Hausa traders across the River Niger into Southern Nigerian agriculture. The first Kola farm and the dominant trading firm in Kola were both orchestrated by Saros. Their owner, Mohammed Shitta Bey, was himself a Saro. The Saros also did not drop their yearning for Western education as they dominated the ranks of professions open to Africans. They were lawyers, doctors, and civil servants.

== Skirmishes in western Nigeria ==
Early on, the Saro who had acquired Western education and European cultural mores during their time in Sierra Leone, began to show paternal characteristics in their relationship with native residents of Lagos. The perceived disrespect extended to some Lagos citizens led to the Saro being expelled from Lagos in the 1850s, although they soon returned.

In 1867, another conflict emerged, this time in Abeokuta. The conflict was between the Egbas and the Europeans. The Egbas were protesting the increasing influence of western culture and a land encroachment led by the Lagos governor, Glover. Egbas decided to go on the rampage and damage European symbols such as churches and missions, and a few Saros were also expelled from Egbaland, but like the case of Lagos, calm was quickly restored. The Abeokuta unrest led to an exodus of its victims to Lagos and the subsequent establishment of Ago Egba, an Egba colony, in Ebute Metta. Prior to the conflict, a few notable Saros and the English missionary Henry Townsend, played prominent roles as advisers to the council of chiefs in Abeokuta.

== Life in the delta ==
The Niger delta was a little bit dissimilar to Lagos and western Nigeria where the Yorubas were dominant. Lagos was much more cosmopolitan while the delta was composed of different and varied ethnic groups of equal political footing. There were also few historical attributes that would foster cultural assimilation. However, the immigrants soon found a home in a few cities especially in the new city of Port Harcourt. Port Harcourt was founded by British authorities in 1913 as a coastal center for the export of Palm oil and coal. A number of immigrants from Yorubaland, the Hausa states, Gambia and Sierra Leone soon came to the city to work. Some of the Saro were clergymen and others were transferred for administrative duty.

The Saro emerged in the city as pioneers of African commerce as they became suppliers to the residents of the new city. However, life in Port Harcourt was rough for many Saro. Some came to the city as workers for British merchant houses and the colonial government. However, there was no job security afforded the immigrants in the new city. Some Saro workers were retired without pension and suffered much financial deprivation. The retired Saro asked to return home, and some were transported back with the help of colonial funds. The lack of promotion and retirement faced by immigrant Africans was partly as a result of a systemic wall against promotion of Saros and Africans by the British. The Saro in Lagos, Port Harcourt and Abeokuta had earned the irritation of Europeans because of the achievement of a few immigrants in the clergy and business world. This policy led to a gradual change among the Saro especially those in the West. The idealistic revolt against the British was led among the missionaries by James Johnson, who decried excessive British interference in the affairs of the missionary society and who wanted more African involvement in promoting Christianity.

== Notable Saro people ==
- Crispin Adeniyi-Jones
- Kitoye Ajasa
- Herbert Bankole-Bright
- R.B. Blaize
- Henry Rawlingson Carr
- G.B.A. Coker
- F.C.O Coker
- Samuel Ajayi Crowther
- J.P.L. Davies
- Sarah Forbes Bonetta Davies
- Adegboyega Edun
- Christiana Abiodun Emanuel
- Charles Joseph George
- James "Holy" Johnson
- Obadiah Johnson
- Samuel Johnson
- Herbert Macaulay
- Thomas Babington Macaulay
- Akinola Maja
- Orisadipe Obasa
- Charlotte Blaize Obasa
- John Otunba Payne
- Samuel Herbert Pearse
- Charles Phillips
- John Randle
- Victoria Davies Randle
- Funmilayo Ransome-Kuti
- Steven Bankole Rhodes
- Oguntola Sapara
- Christopher Sapara Williams
- Agnes Yewande Savage
- Richard Akinwande Savage
- Sofolahan Josiah Sawyerr
- Mohammed Shitta Bey
- Emanuel Peter John Adeniyi Thomas
- Stella Thomas
- William Vivour

== Amaro ==
Unlike the Saro who were principally from Sierra Leone, the Amaro, who were sometimes called Nago in Brazil (Nago indicates Yoruba ethnicity), were liberated slaves from Brazil and Cuba. Returnees from Brazil and Cuba and their current-day descendants were and are more commonly called "Agudas". They went to the New World as slaves from different sub-ethnic and ethnic backgrounds but approached relationships among themselves as equals. They came back to Nigeria, principally, to re-connect with their fatherland. In Lagos, their neighborhood became known as Popo Aguda, Brazilian quarter. They were not brought up in the Anglican faith like the Sierra Leoneans, but Catholicism, the dominant religion in Brazil and Cuba. By the 1880s, the Agudas comprised about 9% of the population of Lagos. Some of the Agudas were Muslims. Some of the Catholic Brazilians and Cubans also worshipped the African Orishas they had also worshipped in Brazil and Cuba. A number of Amaro are now becoming Protestant Christians. These Amaro gave Portuguese and Spanish names in Nigeria, and even once had Portuguese- and Spanish-speaking populations there.

The Brazilian returnees were notably technically skilled artisans and were known for the distinctive Brazilian architecture built in their settlements and later in the Lagos environs. During this time, modern European architecture was not only meant to be a nice abode but also a dominating advertisement to show Africans of a different style and culture. However, in due time, the Brazilian style emerged as a viable alternative and modern style used by African contractors working on public and large private jobs such as Holy Cross Cathedral in Lagos and the Shitta-Bey Mosque. The Brazilians introduced to Nigeria elaborate architectural designs, two-story buildings and bungalows with stucco facades. The Brazilian returnees also popularized the use of Cassava as a food crop. They had pioneered trade with Brazil in the mid-nineteenth century. By the 1880s however, ruinous competitors and an economic downturn had forced many to abandon the export trade. Agriculture soon became an avenue to supplement shortfalls in economic activity. They also introduced cocoa plantations together with the Saro J. P. L. Davies.

Prominent Amaro include Oloye Sir Adeyemo Alakija and Chief Antonio Deinde Fernandez.

== See also ==
- Assimilados
- Bourgeoisie of Nigeria
- Emancipados
- Sierra Leone Creole people
