= Sofolahan Josiah Sawyerr =

Nigerian nationalist (1877–1919)

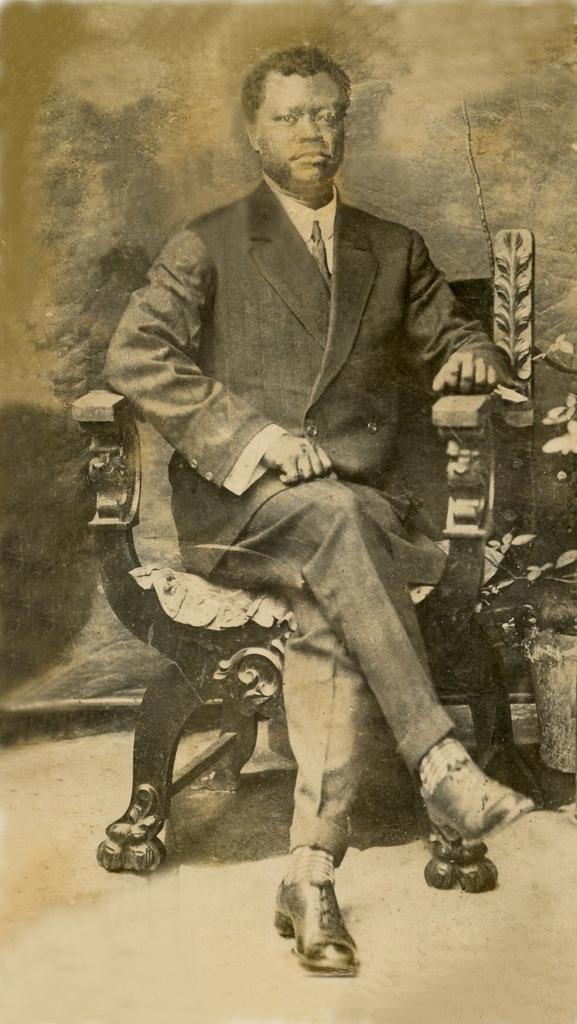

Sofolahan Josiah Sawyerr Esq. (1877 – 8 August 1919) also known as S.J. Sawyerr was a Saro Nigerian nationalist, legislator, and philanthropist. He was involved in various committees and organizations, contributing significantly to society and the development of Lagos in the late 19th century.

== Career ==
Sawyerr was a member of the Roman Catholic Community in Lagos. He lived in the Cocoanut House of Ereko area, then known as the Town of Lagos or Lagos Colony, now Lagos Island. Sawyerr attended masses at the Church of the Holy Cross, now known as the Holy Cross Cathedral, Lagos. As a member, he was part of a deputation that gave an address of congratulations to the Rev. Father Ferdinand Terrien on his appointment as Bishop-Elect of James Gordo and Vicar Apostolic of the coast of Benin, on the 21st of April, 1912. S.J. Sawyerr was also a member of the L.A.A.S.A.P.S. and the Reform Club between 1914 and 1917.

Sawyerr held several important positions. He was the Vice President of The Lagos Auxiliary (Anti-Slavery and Aborigines Protection) in December 1915 and the Honourable Treasurer for the Blyden Memorial Fund in 1915. He was also an unofficial member of the Lagos Town Council, appointed in 1917 under the leadership of A.G. Boyle, and served as an unofficial advisory member of the same council, formerly known as the Lagos Municipal Board of Health.

His philanthropic activities included being a donor to the Nigerian Aeroplane Fund in October 1916, a contributor to the Overseas Contingent (Oxford Fund – Nigeria Regiment W.A.F.F.) in April 1917, and a donor to the St. Mark's Church Building Fund in Lagos. He was also an unofficial member of the Legislative Council at Government House (October 18, 1910), during the absence on leave of Obadiah Johnson.

== Personal life and death ==
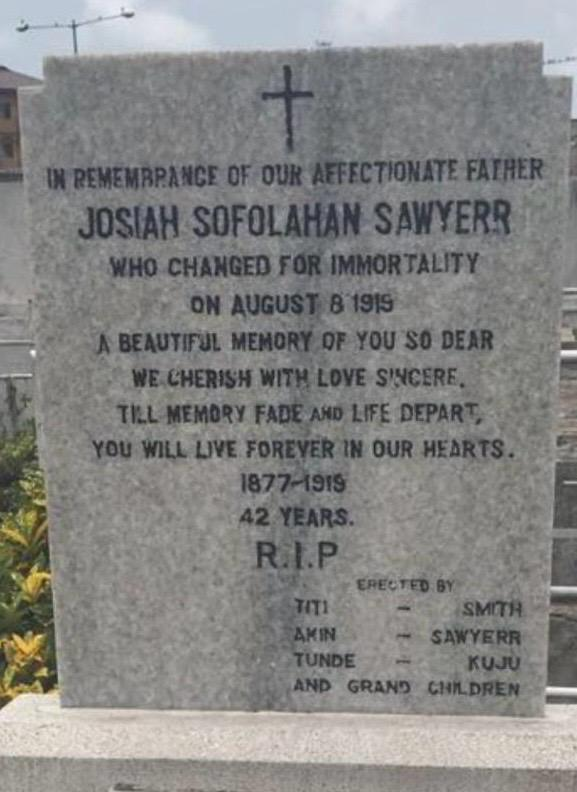
Sawyerr's headstone in Lagos, 2012

Sawyerr was known to be in the circle of friendship with notable figures such as Sir Kitoyi Ajasa, Orisadipe Obasa, James Churchill Vaughan, Oguntola Sapara, Samuel Herbert Pearse, and Eric Olaolu Moore. He was also known for his luxurious lifestyle, including having his clothes dry-cleaned/laundered on British ships plying the West African coast.

Sawyerr died on August 8, 1919, at his Ereko residence.
