= 1923 Nigerian general election =

General elections were held in Nigeria for the first time on 20 September 1923. The Nigerian National Democratic Party (NNDP) won three of the four elected seats in the Legislative Council.

== Background ==
Elective democracy had been introduced in Nigeria in May 1919, when the Townships Ordinance gave the right to vote for three members of Lagos Town Council to some men. The first elections to the council were held on 29 March 1920. In 1922 a new constitution (known as the Clifford Constitution after Governor Hugh Clifford) was promulgated, which introduced four elected seats to the Legislative Council, three for Lagos and one for Calabar.

== Electoral system ==
The 1922 Nigeria (Legislative Council) Order in Council provided for a 46-member Legislative Council, of which 23 were ex-officio officials, four were nominated officials, up to 15 were appointed unofficial members and four were elected. The 23 ex officio officials included the Governor, the Chief Secretary and their deputy, the Lieutenant Governors and secretaries of the Northern and Southern Provinces, the Attorney General, the Commandant of the Nigerian Regiment, the Director of Medical Services, the Treasurer, the Director of Marine, the Comptroller of Customs, the Secretary of Native Affairs, together with ten senior residents.

The franchise was restricted to men aged 21 or over who were British subjects or a native of Nigeria who had lived in their municipal area for the 12 months prior to the election, and who earned at least £100 in the previous calendar year. The right to vote was withheld from those who had been convicted of a crime and sentenced to death, hard labour or prison for more than a year, or were of "unsound mind". Only around 4,000 people registered to vote in Lagos out of a population of 99,000, whilst just 453 registered in Calabar.

All eligible voters could also run as candidates unless they had an undischarged bankruptcy, had received charitable relief in the previous five years or were a public servant. Candidates were required to obtain the nomination of at least three registered voters and pay a £10 deposit. Electoral regulations were passed on 1 June 1923, setting out details of how the elections would be carried out, including the creation of an electoral register. The term of the council was five years.

== Campaign ==
Ten candidates contested the three Lagos seats, whilst four candidates ran for the single seat in Calabar.

== Results ==
Party	Votes	%	Seats
Nigerian National Democratic Party	3,882	77.50	3
People's Union	223	4.45	0
Independents	904	18.05	1
Total	5,009	100.00	4
Source: Tamuno

=== By constituency ===
Calabar (one member)
Candidate	Party	Votes	%
Kwamina Ata-Amonu	Independent	70	33.98
A. Archibong	Independent	69	33.50
C. W. Clinton	Independent	51	24.76
Essien Essien Ofiong	Independent	16	7.77
Total		206	100.00
Source: Tamuno

Lagos (three members)
Candidate	Party	Votes	%
Egerton Shyngle	Nigerian National Democratic Party	1,303	27.13
Eric Moore	Nigerian National Democratic Party	1,298	27.02
Crispin Adeniyi-Jones	Nigerian National Democratic Party	1,281	26.67
Adeyemo Alakija	Independent	271	5.64
Frederick Mulford	Independent	229	4.77
Orisadipe Obasa	People's Union	223	4.64
George Debayo Agbebi	Independent	127	2.64
A.M. Harvey	Independent	47	0.98
Candido da Rocha	Independent	17	0.35
M.N.B. Wilson	Independent	7	0.15
Total		4,803	100.00
Source: Tamuno

=== List of members ===
Governor Clifford appointed 13 unofficial members to the Legislative Council, of which seven were Europeans and six Africans. The seven Europeans represented commercial interests, with three representing the banking, mining and shipping sectors, and four representing commercial interests of Calabar, Kano, Lagos and Port Harcourt. The six Africans represented African Traders, the Colony of Lagos, Oyo Province, Rivers district, the Egba and the Ibo. The nominated officials were the General Manager of Nigerian Railways, the Director of Public Works and the Postmaster-General.

Constituency	Member
Elected members
Calabar	Kwamina Ata-Amonu
Lagos	Egerton Shyngle
Lagos	Eric Moore
Lagos	Crispin Adeniyi-Jones
Nominated African members
African Traders	S.C. Obianwu
Colony	Kitoye Ajasa
Egba	S.H. Pearse
Ibo	I.O. Mba
Oyo Province	E.H. Oke
Rivers district	M. Pepple-Jaja
Nominated commercial members
Banking	L.M. Herepath (Barclays)
Mining	A.L. Butler
Shipping	L.A. Archer
Calabar	G. Graham Paul
Kano	J.W. Speer
Lagos	J.T. Wagstaffe
Port Harcourt	J.B. Jones
Source: Wheare

== Aftermath ==
The new Legislative Council was inaugurated on 31 October. In 1926 a by-election was held in the Lagos seat following Egerton Shyngle's death, and was won by John Caulcrick of the NNDP. In 1927 two of the commercial members were replaced; R F Irving became the member for Lagos on 1 February and H S Feggetter of Elder Dempster Lines became the shipping representative on 4 April.
