= 1926 Lagos by-election =

A by-election was held for the Lagos seat in the Legislative Council of Nigeria on 30 April 1926. It followed the death of incumbent Egerton Shyngle, who had been a member of the Nigerian National Democratic Party (NNDP). John Caulcrick of the NNDP was elected with 69% of the vote.

== Campaign ==
Four candidates contested the elections; Caulcrick, a medical practitioner, was nominated by the NNDP, whilst the other three ran as independents. Two of whom had also contested the 1923 general elections – barrister Adeyemo Alakija and civil engineer George Debayo Agbebi, who had received 6% and 3% of the vote respectively. The final candidate was P J C Thomas, a businessman.

== Results ==
Candidate	Party	Votes	%
John Caulcrick	Nigerian National Democratic Party	451	69.49
Adeyemo Alakija	Independent	93	14.33
P.J.C. Thomas	Independent	58	8.94
George Debayo Agbebi	Independent	47	7.24
Total		649	100.00
Valid votes		649	95.16
Invalid/blank votes		33	4.84
Total votes		682	100.00
Registered voters/turnout		833	81.87
Source: Tamuno
