= I.A.S. Adewale =

Nigerian lawyer and first Lagos State Commissioner of Finance

Ishawo Adio Sanni

1st Lagos State Commissioner of Finance
- In office 1968–Unknown

House Rep Lagos Town Council
- In office 1959–1962

Personal details
- Citizenship: Nigerian
- Parents: Sanni Adewale (father); Amunatu Ejide Savage (mother)
- Education: Royal air Force

Ishawu Adio Sanni was a Nigerian lawyer and company director who was the first Lagos State Commissioner of Finance.

== Early life and education ==
He was born to a wealthy Lagos family, his father was Sanni Adewale who held the title of Olori killa of Lagos, as head of the Muslim organization, the Killa Society and his mother was Amunatu Ejide Savage who was related to Mohammed Shitta Bey. Adewale was educated at C.M.S. Grammar School, thereafter he attended King's College where he excelled in athletics.

== Career ==
He joined the Marine Department as a clerk in 1938 but later moved to London where he trained with the Royal Air Force and was a wireless air gunner towards the end of the War. In 1948, he began law studies in London and qualified to be a barrister in 1951. Thereafter, he returned to Lagos to start a law practice. In 1954, he was the candidate of Action Group in the Lagos Central Constituency for a House of Representative seat but lost to TOS Benson of NCNC, in 1959, he won a seat on the Lagos Town Council, serving until 1962. He later served on the board of various institutions such as the Nigeria Railway Corporation, UCH and Nigeria Ex-Servicemen's Welfare Association.

Adewale was a former chairman of Island Club. In a club address by J.K. Randle, he called Adewale, the boy is good, which later became a popular nickname. In 1968, he was appointed Lagos State Commissioner of Finance, in a pioneer cabinet that included Shafi Edu, Adeniran Ogunsanya and Ganiyu Dawodu.
