= Thomas John Jackson =

Thomas John Jackson (1792 – 1852) was an African-American former slave from Frederick County, Maryland, United States, who emigrated to Cape Palmas in the 19th century. Thomas Jackson was one of the most prominent early Americo-Liberian and was among the early American settlers of Liberia. Thomas Jackson is mentioned in the African Repository by the American Colonization Society and the Maryland State Colonization Society.

== Emigration to Liberia ==
Thomas Jackson a mason was emancipated in view of emigrating to Liberia by his enslaver W. N. Ritchie, Esq. and Amelia Jackson (seamstress) his wife known simply as "Milly" was emancipated in view of emigrating to Liberia by her enslaver J. P. Thompson, Esq.

Thomas Jackson and Amelia Jackson both emigrated to Liberia aboard the ship Lafayette, which sailed from Baltimore for Monrovia, on December 7, 1832, and arrived in Monrovia on January 20, 1833. Thomas Jackson was 40 years old and Milly 37 years old at the time they sailed on the Lafayette. Both settled at Caldwell and shortly after, Milly Jackson died in 1834. Thomas Jackson later joined the emigrants on the Brig ANN which arrived in Monrovia and headed to Cape Palmas arriving February 11, 1834 where he settled.

Thomas Jackson was prominent and influential in the affairs of the colony. He was appointed an assistant Agent by the Maryland State Colonization Society in 1835 and became a magistrate, 1837 - 1848.

Thomas Jackson later married Anna Maria Scott a manumitted slave from Talbot County in 1837. Anna Maria Scott departed from Baltimore on June 28, 1835, on the schooner Harmony, arriving at Cape Palmas, Liberia on August 23, 1835. She married Thomas Jackson in 1837, gave birth to Victoria (Victory) in 1845 and John Payne Jackson was born on March 25, 1848.

As a prominent figure in the colony in Liberia, Thomas Jackson would often travel to the United States to give speeches about the status of the African American colony in Liberia and was supportive of American Colonization Society. Thomas Jackson felt that the only way African Americans could be successful was by colonizing a new space in West Africa (This is evidenced in his letters to the Maryland State Colonization Society published in the Maryland Colonization Journal).

An extract mentions one of his trips as advertised in the local press:

"On September 20, 1838, Thomas Jackson, of Cape Palmas, addressed a crowd at the Evangelical Lutheran Church on East Church Street in Frederick on the colonization program. He left Frederick for Africa in 1831. (The independent African state of Maryland was founded at Cape Palmas in 1833 and was annexed by Liberia in 1857.)"

== Missionary work ==
Thomas Jackson was a staunch Christian who readily gave up his role as deputy Judge to dedicate his life in the spreading of the Gospel to the natives. This can be better described by the letter written by Samuel McGill (of the McGill family - The first official doctor of African descent for the Maryland State Colonization Society’ colony in Liberia) to the President of the Maryland State Colonization Society dated June 26, 1843, Harper, Cape Palmas and published in the Maryland Colonization Journal.

One of our most intelligent and enterprising colonists, originally from Maryland, has recently resigned an honorable and lucrative trust in the colony, in order to engage in missionary operations. Rev. Thomas Jackson, the individual in question has accepted of an appointment by the Methodist mission, and is now located at Saurika, some distance in the interior. He felt it his duty to go forth and aid in the spread of the Gospel, for which the Africans suffer. He has erected his dwelling, has opened a school, and large numbers attend his preaching. Already the poor natives have been benefited by his ministry, and his labors have but just commenced. Who is to publish the farther proceedings of this devoted colonial missionary ! Who is to chronicle the happy effects that will arise from the efforts of this humble Christian colonist in the interior of Africa ? A post that has been occupied and resigned by other missions, now falls to the lot of one of our colonists : and although the report of his success may not probably extend beyond the borders of our colony, yet we feel assured that his reward will be conferred in another and better world.

Thomas Jackson was listed as a Reverend and probationer of the Methodist Church in the Journal of the General Conference of the Methodist Episcopal Church 1844–1847. Evidence of his missionary work was mentioned in the Journal of a tour of Governor John B Russwurm and Mr Stuart to the Saureekai, Toboe and Bolobo countries on October 4, 1843, published in the Maryland Colonization Journal:

Having determined on a visit to the interior as far as the Bourroboh country, and everything being ready for our departure, King Freeman, Yellow Will, J. H. Stewart and myself, accompanied by 12 natives and 3 settlers, left the banks of our river about noon, October 4, on our journey to Saureekai big town. ...After paying our respects to the King, we steered our course to the Methodist Mission House outside of the town, where we were hospitably entertained during our sojourn, by the resident missionary, the Rev. Thos. Jackson. This mission has been in Operation 6 or 8 months, and the school numbers 25 or 30 scholars. The Society have two other stations, nearly ready for occupation, in the Saureekai country; and they have done well, aware as we all are, of the love of palavers among natives, and the unsettled state of the country from war.

== Members of the family ==
- Plato Jackson (1st son - Left behind in Baltimore 1832)
- Victoria Jackson (Daughter: born 1845)
- John Payne Jackson (Son: 25 March 1848 – 1 August 1915)
- Thomas Horatio Jackson (Son of John Payne Jackson: 1879 – 1935)
- Lydia Jackson (Sister - Left behind in Baltimore 1832)
