= Alternative press in Nigeria =

The Alternative press in Nigeria or the press of the third kind is made up of writers who use militant approaches or viewpoints in news coverage. This usually encompasses guerrilla journalism, a term credited to some Nigerian news magazines for their radical and militant rhetoric and writings usually against the military regimes of the 1990s. The magazines consider themselves to be the last vestige of the common man and viewed certain military governments as usurpers of the people's dreams and yearnings. These magazines are known for their belligerent assault on national leadership and use of secret offices, sometimes called bush offices to print their publications. Some critics have raised ethnic nationalism and cultural coloration as key factors which provided the impetus for most of the rhetoric.

== History ==
Caustic criticism of colonial or Nigerian government is not a new phenomenon. However, during the colonial period, guerrilla tactics were not employed as most papers fought openly for press freedom like those afforded the British press. During the period, the rise of Pan-Africanists like Marcus Garvey and Dr Blyden gave roots to their offsprings in the Nigerian press. Three major newspapers of the late nineteenth century, the Lagos Weekly Record, headed by Payne Jackson, Iwe Irohin and the Lagos Standard headed by Mr George Alfred Williams based a large part of their mission on nationalism and defense of African cultural values. The role of the papers to embrace cultural nationalism led to constant frictions between the political and business elites who were sometimes at the receiving of the criticism.

== Guerrilla journalism ==
In contrast, modern Nigerian news magazines which pride itself as the last hope of the common man and which took on mobile and secret radical activism as a result of the suppression of the press where always assaulted by the government. Most of the dominant journalists of the period came from prominent newspapers but left for clandestine trenches to provide a platform for freedom of expression, reporting the truth and also everyday news essentials. The magazines comprised TELL, The News, TSM, Tempo and PM News. In 1995, a few editors from the magazines were jailed in a coup trial, the first major personnel constrictive action taken by the military.
