= Richard Beale Blaize =

Richard Blaize
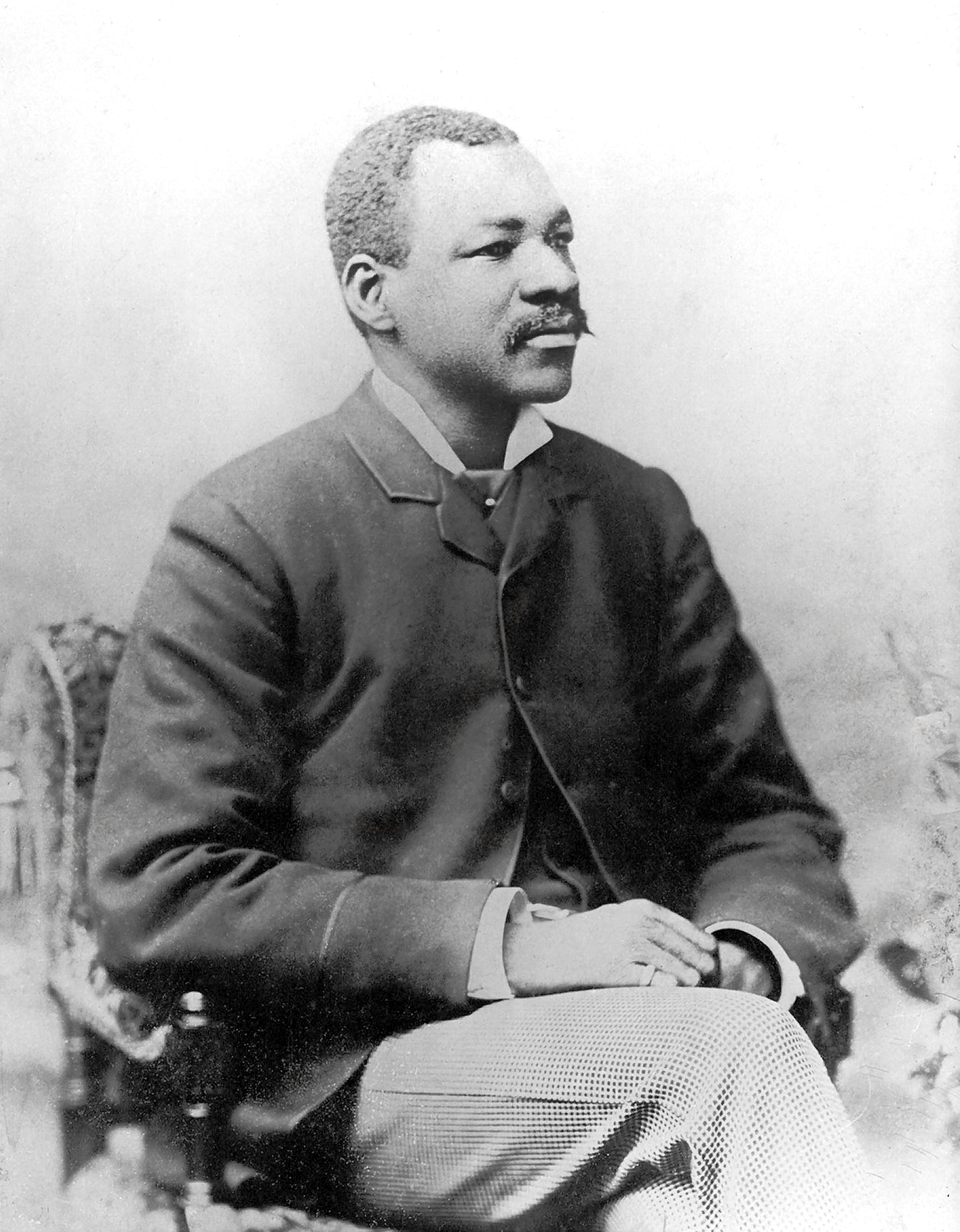
- Richard Olamilege Beale Blaize, ca. 1885
- Born: 1845; Freetown
- Died: 1904 (aged 58–59); Lagos
- Occupation: Businessman
- Spouse: Emily Cole
- Children: 6, including Charlotte
- Relatives: Orisadipe Obasa (son-in-law); Lola Maja (great-great-granddaughter)

Richard Beale Blaize (November 22, 1845 – September 21, 1904) was a Nigerian-Sierra Leonean businessman, newspaper publisher, financier, and black nationalist of Sierra Leonean and Nigerian heritage.

== Early life ==
Richard Olamilege Blaize was born in Freetown, Sierra Leone, to a Creole family of emancipated slaves of Yoruba origin. His parents were Ojelabi Olapajuokun (who later took the name John Blaize) and Maria Blaize. At an early age, he attended a mission school and was nurtured in the Christian way. He started work as an apprentice for a printer in Freetown but soon left the country for the Lagos Colony in 1862.

== Career in business and political activism ==
=== Business ===
After arriving Lagos in 1862, Blaize worked as a printer for Robert Campbell, editor of the newspaper The Anglo-American. He then left printing for merchandise trading and importation. In trading, the participants were numerous, especially those from Lagos; most of the traders mainly dealt with exchanging goods with exporters and a few delved into exportation. A number of traders owned steamers, which were used to navigate the Niger River to buy goods from groups across river, and some even boasted they showed the imperialists how to move across the river. Blaize was among a few of the Lagos merchants to be very successful in trading; he was an importer and was also involved with trade across the Niger. Though the ruinous approach of competitors led to many indigenous enterprises foundling not the least helped with the dominance of sole proprietorships, Blaize thrived in the midst of strong competition and became one of the wealthiest West Africans of his time. He was included in the European Lagos Chamber of Commerce constituted in 1888 and was on the 1898 Commission on Trade in Lagos.

=== Political activism ===
He was a prominent member of the Royal African Society during the second half of the nineteenth century. He was also at various times, a newspaper publisher. He entered the newsprint business in 1880, with the launch of The Lagos Times and Gold Coast Colony Advertiser. The paper brought on Mr Mojola Agbebi, who later became prominent and known for his views on cultural Nationalism. However, the life of the newspaper was short, it folded in 1883. He was thereafter approached by John Payne Jackson, a Liberian emigrant who wanted to re-invent the Times. After much prodding, Blaize agreed to publish a new rag: the Lagos Weekly Times. Through his newspapers, he took an active part in demanding more education, better representation for Africans in Lagos, self-government, and pushed for a separation of Lagos Colony from the Gold Coast Colony which was later separated in 1886.

Blaize's political clout in Lagos Colony was demonstrated in 1901 during the contest for the Lagos Throne. After Governor William MacGregor refused to accept any of the rival candidates (Oduntan and Ajose Dawudu) for the Obaship, one of the king-makers (Yesufu Omo-Oba) introduced Eshugbayi Eleko to Blaize, and Blaize, in turn, introduced Eshugbayi Eleko to Governor MacGregor, who recognized Eleko as Oba of Lagos.

== Private life ==
Blaize married Emily Cole in 1871 and the couple had 6 children including Charlotte Olajumoke, who in 1902, married Dr. Orisadipe Obasa. Emily Cole died in 1895.

== Death, legacy and philanthropy ==
In the 1890s Blaize's financial worth was estimated to be about £150,000. Blaize donated £500 in memory of Mary Kingsley to the Liverpool School of Tropical Medicine. When he died in 1904, he bequeathed £3,000 for the foundation of the Blaize Memorial Institute in Abeokuta, which opened in 1909 and functioned well into the 1970s. Blaize kept his connection with Freetown, his place of birth, bequeathing £500 to the Princess Christian Hospital there. Blaize left an estate valued at £60,000 to his children. One of his descendants is Nigerian make-up artist Lola Maja.
