= Aduke Alakija =

Nigerian welfare officer, lawyer and diplomat

Member of Nigerian Delegation to United Nations
- In office 1961–1965

Executive Secretary of the Lagos State Chamber of Commerce
- In office 1967–1967

Nigerian Ambassador to Sweden
- In office 1984–1987

Personal details
- Born: Jaiyeola Aduke Alakija; March 1921
- Died: March 2016 (aged 95)
- Parent: Adeyemo Alakija (father)
- Relatives: Kofi Annan (brother-in-law); Kojo Annan (nephew)

Jaiyeola Aduke Alakija (March 1921 – March 2016) was a Nigerian welfare officer, lawyer and diplomat who was the country's ambassador to Sweden from 1984 to 1987. She was also a former president of the International Federation of Women Lawyers.

== Life ==
Alakija was born to the family of Sir Adeyemo Alakija; she was the only daughter and last child of his first marriage. She started her education at the Claxton House School, Marina, Lagos but left for Wales in 1930 and finished her secondary school at Penrhos College, North Wales. She initially wanted to study medicine at Glasgow University but then transferred to the London School of Economics to study social science.

About 1941 Alakija was elected as the first female vice president of the West African Students' Union, a London based association set up in 1925.

On returning to Nigeria, she worked as a welfare officer in the Lagos judiciary. There she initiated the creation of a juvenile court and caused the establishment of a number of girls clubs in Lagos, as well as assisting in the formation of the Lagos branch of the British Leprosy Relief Association. In 1949, she left Nigeria to study law, qualifying as a barrister in 1953. Thereafter, she set up a law practice with Miss Gloria Rhodes and worked in the chambers of John Idowu Conrad Taylor. She briefly left law to work as a Social Welfare Officer, becoming the first African woman to hold the position in Nigeria.

In Alakija's professional career, she was an assistant to the general manager of Mobil Oil, and later became a director and legal advisor to Mobil Oil Nigeria in 1957. In 1961, Mobil won a concession for oil exploration in Nigeria, and Alakija later became a director in this new venture. In 1967, she was the executive secretary of the Lagos State Chamber of Commerce. From 1961 to 1965, she was a member of Nigeria's delegation to the United Nations.

Alakija was a co-founder of New Era Girls College, a member of the International Women Society of Nigeria and member of Soroptimist International.

She held an honorary degree from Barnard College.
