= Kitoye Ajasa =

Nigerian lawyer and colonial legislator

Sir Kitoye Ajasa OBE
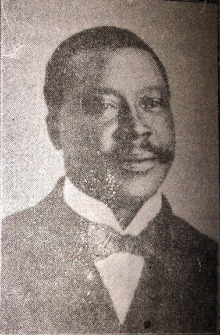
- Ajasa c. 1919
- Born: Edmund Macaulay; 10 August 1866; Lagos
- Died: 1937
- Citizenship: Nigerian
- Education: Inner Temple Inn of Court
- Occupations: Lawyer, legislator
- Known for: First Nigerian to be knighted
- Political party: People's Union
- Spouse(s): Lucretia Olayinka Moore, Lady Ajasa
- Children: Oyinkansola Abayomi
- Father: Thomas Benjamin Macaulay

Sir Kitoye Ajasa OBE (also spelled Kitoyi; 10 August 1866 – 1937) was a Nigerian lawyer and legislator during the colonial period. He was conservative, and worked closely with the colonial authorities. He thought that progress would only be possible if Africans adopted European ideas and institutions. Ajasa was one of the leaders of the People's Union, and was the founder of the conservative newspaper the Nigerian Pioneer. He was the first Nigerian to be knighted.

== Early years ==
Kitoye Ajasa was from a branch of the Saro community that had migrated from Ajase in Dahomey to Lagos.

His father, Thomas Benjamin Macaulay, had been born in Dahomey, taken into slavery and then freed in Sierra Leone. Kitoye Ajasa was originally called Edmund Macaulay.

He was born in Lagos on 10 August 1866. He studied at CMS Grammar School, Lagos. He then moved to England where he attended Dulwich College, a public school, and then studied law at the Inner Temple Inn of Court. He was called to the bar in 1893. He changed his name to Kitoye Ajasa after spending twelve years in London. He returned to Lagos, where he started his legal practice. He married Lucretia Olayinka Moore, an Egba princess.

== Politician and publisher ==
In 1906, Ajasa became an unofficial member of the Legislative Council, and in 1914, he was made a member of the Nigerian Council of Governor-General Frederick Lugard, 1st Baron Lugard (1858–1945). Ajasa and others such as John K. Randle, Christopher Sapara Williams and Henry Rawlingson Carr thought obstructing the British administration was counter-productive, since it was only through the British that development would be possible.

Ajasa called radicals "water rate agitators." He advocated full adoption of European ideas and institutions as the fastest way to make progress. His contemporaries attacked him for this attitude, saying his newspaper was "the guardian angel of an oligarchy of reactionaries", and wondering why "any man in Lagos, African by birth, race and descent ... should be so wholly devoid of race consciousness, and utterly oblivious of appreciation of the duties, obligations and responsibilities devolving on him."

Ajasa was one of the leading members of the People's Union founded in 1908 by John Randle (1855–1928). Others were Orisadipe Obasa (1863–1940), Richard Akinwande Savage (1874–1935) and Adeyemo Alakija (1884–1952). Although the People's Union was controlled by men with conservative views, it attracted some professionals with progressive ideas such as Ernest Ikoli (1893–1960), journalist and founder of the Nigerian Youth Movement. The People's Union, which was in favour of gradual introduction of reforms, opposed the more radical and nationalist Nigerian National Democratic Party (NNDP) founded in 1922 by Herbert Macaulay. The People's Union dissolved in 1928 after Randle died.

Ajasa founded the Nigerian Pioneer in 1914 as an alternative to the radical Weekly Record of John Payne Jackson (1848–1915).

Because he was known to be a confidant of Lugard, it was widely thought that the government funded the paper. The newspaper generally supported government measures and opposed people and organisations that the government disliked.

It did not indulge in anti-government polemics as did other papers at the time, and was distrusted by many of the people of Lagos.

Ajasa wrote in 1923 that his paper "existed in order to interpret thoroughly and accurately the Government to the people and the people to the Government".

Kitoye Ajasa became a Judge of the High Court of Lagos. He was made an Officer of the Order of the British Empire (OBE) in the 1924 Birthday Honours and was made a Knight Bachelor in the 1928 Birthday Honours. He was the first Nigerian to be knighted.

Ajasa remained a legislator until 1933. He died in 1937.

The Nigerian Pioneer closed down after his death.

His children included the Nigerian nationalist and feminist Oyinkan, Lady Abayomi (1897–1990).

== Freemasonry ==
Sir Kitoyi was a Freemason and had a very high regard for Freemasonry. He was installed Worshipful Master of Lagos Lodge No. 1171 in 1901, 1906, 1907, 1908 & 1928.

== Quotations ==
Some opinions that Ajasa expressed in the Pioneer:

- "We in West Africa have been for generations under British rule and with that rule we are satisfied." (7 September 1917)
- "... it might be suicidal for any empire to let the subject races into its secrets by having them employed in positions of trust ..." (7 September 1917)
- "[the government should] look upon the educated natives as an asset of the Empire to be utilised in Imperial interests." (7 September 1917)
- "An educated class is fast growing among natives throughout ... the African continent. The more highly educated the African is the more intense is his love for his country, and the more he presses for a greater and more effective voice in the shaping of the destiny of his people ... But the educated native still cries in the wilderness ... his cry must be heeded some day." (14 September 1917)
- "Nigeria's lot is cast, and God grant it will, nay, and must be cast for years to come in and within the Empire..." (17 October 1930)

== Sources ==
- Awa, Eme O. (1964). Federal Government in Nigeria. University of California Press. GGKEY:1QY5QRE1913.
- Coleman, James Samuel; Coleman, James Smoot (1 January 1971). Nigeria: Background to Nationalism. University of California Press. ISBN 978-0-520-02070-2.
- Ezera, Kalu (1960). Constitutional Developments in Nigeria: An Analytical Study of Nigeria's Constitution-making Developments and the Historical and Political Factors that Affected Constitutional Change. CUP Archive. GGKEY:2UE57755F5G.
- Falola, Toyin (2004). Nationalism and African Intellectuals. University Rochester Press. ISBN 978-1-58046-149-8.
- Falola, Toyin; Aderinto, Saheed (2010). Nigeria, Nationalism, and Writing History. University Rochester Press. ISBN 978-1-58046-358-4.
- July, Robert W. (2004). The Origins of Modern African Thought: Its Development in West Africa During the Nineteenth and Twentieth Centuries. Africa World Press. ISBN 978-1-59221-199-9.
- Macmillan, Alistair (1920). The Red Book of West Africa. Frank Cass and Co.
- Olaoba, O. B. (2002). Yoruba Legal Culture. FOP Press. ISBN 978-978-35768-5-8.
- Oyebade, Adebayo; Falola, Toyin (2003). The Foundations of Nigeria: Essays in Honor of Toyin Falola. Africa World Press. ISBN 978-1-59221-120-3.
- "Sir Kitoye Ajasa". Nigeria Book of Records. 31 October 2014. Archived from the original on 2 April 2015.
- Sklar, Richard L. (2004). Nigerian Political Parties: Power in an Emergent African Nation. Africa World Press. ISBN 978-1-59221-209-5.
- Teniola, Eric (2013). "The creoles in Nigeria (2)". Daily Independent. Archived from the original on 2 April 2015.
- Whiteman, Kye (1 October 2013). Lagos: A Cultural History. Interlink Publishing Group, Incorporated. ISBN 978-1-62371-040-8.
- Wyse, Akintola (11 December 2003). H. C. Bankole-Bright and Politics in Colonial Sierra Leone, 1919–1958. Cambridge University Press. ISBN 978-0-521-53333-1.
