= National Congress of British West Africa =

Nationalist organization in West Africa

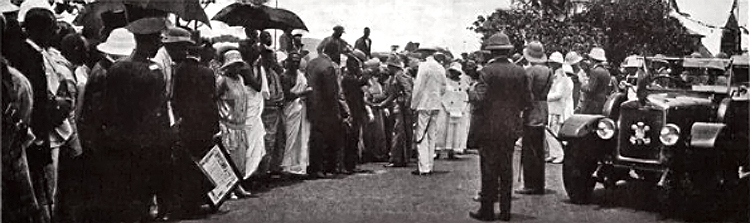
Visit of His Royal Highness The Prince of Wales to the Gold Coast Colony 1925. The Prince of Wales shaking hands with the members of the Ladies' Branch of the National Congress of British West Africa.

The National Congress of British West Africa (NCBWA), founded in 1920, was one of the earliest nationalist organizations in West Africa, and one of the earliest formal organizations working toward African emancipation. It was largely composed of an educated elite in the Gold Coast, who felt under threat from the incorporation of 'traditional authorities' in the colonial system. The cofounders included Thomas Hutton-Mills, Sr., the first President, and J. E. Casely Hayford, the first Vice-President. Other co-founders and early officials included Edward Francis Small, F. V. Nanka-Bruce, A. B. Quartey-Papafio, Henry van Hien, Akilagpa Sawyerr, Kobina Sekyi and Fred W. Dove.

== Founding ==
=== Inspiration ===
The idea of creating the National Congress of British West Africa (NCBWA) was first conceived in 1914 during a conversation "between J. E. Casely Hayford, a barrister from the Gold Coast" and "Dr. Akinwande Savage, a Nigerian doctor". Part of the inspiration for the creation of the NCBWA in the 1920s was growing concern that larger pan-African movements of the era were too broad in their scope and did not adequately address the concerns of West Africans. It was this desire to have a more consolidated scope for the development of nationalist aims that, in part, sparked the creation of the NCBWA in 1920.

=== Regional influences ===
The founding of the NCBWA was based on the existing legacy of resistance and nationalist movements throughout the colonies in British West Africa. Some of the resistance movements that influenced the development of the NCBWA were those by "King Aggrey of Cape Coast in the Gold Coast in the 1860s" and "King Kosoko of Lagos & Jaja of Opobo in the nineteenth century". The previous nationalist movements that sparked the creation of the NCBWA included the Gold Coast Aborigines' Rights Protection Society (ARPS) and the Fante Confederation. The NCBWA was influenced not only by nationalist movements in the region but also by the works of key African nationalist scholars in the region, such as Dr. Africanus Beale Horton, Dr. Edward Wilmot Blyden, and John Payne Jackson.

=== International influences ===
The emergence of the NCBWA can also be contextualized within the larger, international nationalist movements of the early twentieth century that occurred on behalf of Africans and people of African descent specifically, and on behalf of subjugated peoples around the globe more broadly. Some of the international events that paved the way for the development of the NCBWA were the First Universal Races Congress of 1911, the International Conference on the Negro in 1911, the creation of the African Progress Union and Union of Students of African Descent in the United Kingdom in 1917, and the end of World War I.

=== Internal motivations ===
Throughout the nineteenth century, educated West African elite were permitted to serve as government officials throughout British West Africa, because the British colonial leaders saw the educated elite as necessary allies. However, by 1902, the favour that the British colonial leaders had previously given to the educated African elite began to diminish as a result of the institution of discriminatory policies, such as one issued by the “West African Medical Service” that stated that educated Africans could only participate in the service if they were of “«European» parentage”. In addition to the use of discriminatory policies, the British colonial government began to exclude educated West Africans from local government positions, in favour of “preserving traditional authority”. This shift in favour occurred in an effort to “protect” the indigenous populations from what the British colonial government perceived to be the tyranny of "a small minority of educated Europeanised natives who have nothing in common with [native peoples], and whose interests are often opposed to theirs". The growing alienation of the educated African elite from the British colonial leaders and the growing irritation of the educated elite in response to this alienation provided the backbone for the formation of the NCBWA.

=== Formation ===
A combination of regional, international, and internal influences and motivations culminated in the formation of the National Congress of British West Africa (NCBWA) in March 1920. The foundation of the NCBWA was formalized with its first meeting in Accra, a meeting which drew participants from Nigeria, Sierra Leone, The Gambia, and the Gold Coast.

==== Agreements from the first meeting of the NCBWA ====
During the inaugural meeting of the NCBWA, a series of agreements were reached, which have been reproduced below:

1. " i. that half of the members of each of the Legislative Councils in British West Africa should be elected Africans, and that there should be in each colony a new House of Assembly consisting of all the members of the colony's Legislative Council and six other elected representatives, with control over finance;"
2. " ii. that municipal government should be developed to the extent that corporations with a majority of elected members and with full powers of local government are established in each principal town of each colony;"
3. " iii. that there should be no discrimination against Africans in the civil service;"
4. " iv. that executive and judicial functions should be separated and that only duly qualified and experienced legal men should hold judicial appointments;"
5. " v. that a British West African Court of Appeal duly constituted should be established;"
6. " vi. that certain « obnoxious » ordinances and those objectionable ones relating to land should be repealed or modified as the case may be;"
7. " vii. that a West African university should be established and compulsory education introduced in all the four colonies;"
8. " viii. that foreign immigration should be controlled and « undesirable » Syrians repatriated;"
9. " ix. that the partitioning of African countries should not be done without first consulting the wishes of the peoples concerned;"
10. " x. that indigenous co-operative enterprises, to be directed by a « British West African Co-operative Association », should be promoted;"
11. " xi. that a British West African Press, with an organ to be called the British West African National Review, should be established and,"
12. " xii. that laws that threaten « the liberty of the Press » should be repealed "

==== Influence of the NCBWA agreements ====
One of the agreements reached during the first meeting of the NCBWA, particularly the seventh agreement above regarding the establishment of a West African university, served as one of the earliest instances of a call for increased access to higher education in British West Africa and paved the way for further dialogue with regard to education policy throughout the colonies of British West Africa. The fourth agreement brought forth by the NCBWA was a critical stepping stone in redesigning the relationship between the colonial and the indigenous judicial systems. Specifically, dissent to the adjudication of a case known as the "Knowles trial" was informed in part by the fourth NCBWA agreement and catalyzed action on the part of the colonial government in Ghana to overhaul the judicial system to allow for defendants to have a right to a trial by jury and a right to "assistance of legal counsel". This reform came about as a result of "criticism of the criminal justice system in Ashanti" published in the Gold Coast Independent, a newspaper in the Gold Coast during the early twentieth century.

== Branches of the NCBWA ==
=== The Gambia ===
The Gambian branch of the NCBWA developed when Gambian members of the larger NCBWA movement took over an existing organization with similar aims, known as the Gambia Native Defensive Union. The Gambian branch of the NCBWA was historically known as the “Bathurst committee”, because Bathurst was the former name of the modern day capital city of The Gambia, Banjul. Among the key figures that made up the Gambian branch of the NCBWA were Edward Francis Small, John A. Mahoney, M. S. Oldfield, J. J. Oldfield, Jatta Joof, Benjamin J. George, M. S. J. Richards, S. J. Forster, Issac J. Roberts, and L. J. Roberts, who was the president of the Gambian branch.

The main goal for the Gambian branch of the NCBWA was to successfully establish elected representation in the Gambian government that would include prominent elite members of Gambian society, as the Gambian branch was made up predominantly of members of the Creole middle class. In attempting to lobby for the creation of elected representation, the members of the Gambian branch were unable to determine how to best include the large Muslim community in The Gambia into the elected representation that they were setting out to achieve. This inability to determine how to best include the Muslim community led to the creation of internal factions which undermined the efforts of the Gambian branch. Another factor that also undermined the ability of the Gambian branch to meet its desired agenda was its inability to include the poorer, peasant citizenry into their discussions.

Although the Gambian branch of the NCBWA was unsuccessful at achieving its goal of creating “elected representation” in the colonial government, the branch was successful in meeting its economic aims. With the aid of Edward Francis Small, the Gambian committee was able to create the Gambia Co-operative Union to address some its economic concerns.

The decline of the Gambian branch of the NCBWA came as a result of dissent from members of the Gambian colonial government as to the legitimacy of the need for representative government in the colony. Moreover, members of the colonial government believed that the Gambian elite who made up the Gambian branch were actually of Sierra Leonean origin and thus could not effectively speak on behalf of the citizens of The Gambia.

=== Nigeria ===
The Nigerian branch of the NCBWA was historically referred to as the "Lagos committee". Prior to the formal establishment of the Lagos branch of the NCBWA, there were several talks among the political elite of Lagos to gain wider support for the movement. Some of the principal members of the original committee in Lagos included Dr. Richard Akinwande Savage, Dr. John K. Randle, and J. G. Campbell. Crucial to the development of the NCBWA effort in Lagos was the support of members of the Muslim community and thus, "Karimu Kotun, one of the influential Lagos Muslims, was appointed Assistant Secretary." This initial committee experienced difficulty in working effectively because Dr. Savage and Dr. Randle had personal grievances. It was as a result of the irreconcilable differences between Dr. Savage and Dr. Randle that a new committee with wider-ranging ties throughout Nigeria was formed. In an effort to widen the reach of the Lagos Branch of the NCBWA, the members of the new committee sought to include members of the traditional governance structures, such as “Obas and Chiefs”.

The Lagos branch of the NCBWA was formally established on 21 June 1920. During the first meeting of the newly created Lagos Branch of the NCBWA, the committee members decided to “establish branches of the Congress in different parts of Nigeria”. Another major meeting of the newly formed Lagos branch of the NCBWA occurred on 16 October 1920. During this second meeting, three resolutions were passed that helped to outline the scope of the work of the Lagos branch of the NCBWA, to determine the methodology for securing funds for the organization, and to give support for the members of the Lagos branch who had been sent to England with other members from other branches of the NCBWA to serve as the representatives for the people of Lagos.

=== Sierra Leone ===
The crucial moments in the development of the Sierra Leonean branch of the NCBWA were meetings that were convened on 29 April 1918 and on 6 May 1918. The first meeting in April was critical in that it helped to establish the desired goals of a "West African Conference", particularly that such a conference would bring the West African colonies together and give voice to the concerns of the West African peoples. The second meeting in May was notable for its articulation of the leadership of the Sierra Leonean branch of the NCBWA, which was made up of 42 members from various contingents of the West African elite.

The Sierra Leonean branch of the NCBWA was formally created in February 1919. This newly formed committee later attended a meeting of the larger, parent NCBWA in Accra. The contributions of the Sierra Leonean delegation to the Accra conference included recommendations "for the improvement of the medical services in the colonies" as well as calls for the "expulsion of the Lebanese", who were seen as "an economically strong and alien minority".

Following the first meeting of members of all branches of the NCBWA in Accra, Ghana, the second conference of the NCBWA was held in Freetown, Sierra Leone, in 1923. During this meeting, Congress members discussed constitutional reforms, the development of a "West African Court of Appeal", medical reforms, and the development of a West African press.

Throughout the duration of the Sierra Leonean branch of the NCBWA, questions about the formation of the Congress were raised, with particular concern about the degree to which the concerns of the elite founders of the Congress movement in Sierra Leone matched the concerns of the indigenous peoples in the colony. Some in the colonial government also feared that the Congress in Sierra Leone was "too large and too grandiose", and because of this "grandiosity" there would be difficulties in procuring the funds that would need to be used to sustain the Congress. Despite these concerns, the Sierra Leonean branch of the NCBWA outlasted its counterparts in Nigeria, the Gold Coast, and The Gambia by about 10 years, officially ending in the late 1940s.

== Legacy ==
=== International interactions ===
==== London ====
Following a March 1920 conference of the NCBWA in Accra, two members from each of the branches of the NCBWA went to London in September 1920. The goal of this meeting was to get formal recognition from the King of the United Kingdom for the resolutions that the NCBWA had agreed upon in Accra. However, when the NCBWA delegation arrived in London, they were not allowed to meet with the Secretary of State because the colonial governors from the NCBWA representatives’ respective nations regarded the NCBWA as a movement that was both unnecessary and unrepresentative of the aims of the indigenous peoples of British West Africa.

==== The UNIA and the NCBWA ====
Another pan-African movement that arose during the same time as the NCBWA was the United Negro Improvement Association (UNIA), a pan-African movement led by Marcus Garvey that wanted to create "an independent black republic over the entire continent of Africa". In its attempts to maintain its dominance among West African elites, the NCBWA publicly denounced and derided the formation of the UNIA as illegitimate and dangerous. Moreover, the NCBWA said that the viewpoint of the members of the UNIA was American and thus incompatible with the struggles and needs of the indigenous, African peoples. The main point of contention between the UNIA and the NCBWA was that the NCBWA did not want African nations to be independent from their colonial leaders but rather wanted to ensure that the West African elite were adequately represented in the colonial government. Similarly to the NCBWA, the UNIA established branches throughout West Africa in order to promulgate its message throughout the region and in the process gained the support of West African elites who would have otherwise joined the NCBWA. Despite the political differences and competition between the UNIA and NCBWA, however, both of the organizations came together following the economic hardship brought about by World War I to help increase the economic prospects of Africans at home and abroad.

=== The decline of the NCBWA ===
The formal parent organization of the NCBWA began to decline following an unsuccessful trip to London to convince the king of the legitimacy of the NCBWA. Some of the branches of the NCBWA continued to exist even after the decline of the larger NCBWA organization.The decline of the NCBWA was also influenced by gradual movements towards "territorial nationalist movements" that focused on advancing nationalist aims specific to the branches of the NCBWA rather than pursuing general principles that applied to all of British West Africa. This trend was inspired by similar measures occurring in the former French West African countries, as they began to get "representative assemblies" specific to particular nations rather than to the larger, West African region.
