= J. K. Randle =

Nigerian businessman and socialite

Chief Joseph Kosoniola Randle MVO MBE (28 July 1909 – December 1956) was a Nigerian businessman and socialite from Lagos. He was Chef de Mission of the Nigerian Olympic team to Melbourne and was connected to various public activities in Lagos. Randle was a social crusader and philanthropist who started the Nigerian arm of the Anti-Tuberculosis Society, a member of the Lagos Town Council (though his politics discouraged extreme nationalism) and was a sportsman who was a trustee of a proposed National Stadium.

== Life ==
Randle was born on 28 July 1909; his father was John Randle, a Saro medical doctor, and his mother came from the Aguda side of Lagos. He was educated at CMS Grammar School, Lagos and King's College, Lagos. In college, he loved playing football cricket and was a member and first captain of Zik's Athletic club. He was born to a well-to-do father, but when his father died, much of his estate was left elsewhere for philanthropic purposes. At the time of his father's death, Randle was in the senior year of King's College and his dream of attending a university became financially infeasible. He worked for a brief period as a junior clerk with the treasury department, in the same office with Adeniji Adele.

Randle later moved to Ilesha to try his luck in gold mining. He was not successful in the mining business and returned to Lagos and engaged in trade, contract and business promotion where he earned some income. He held the chieftaincy title of the Lisa of Lagos. It was given to him by Oba Adeniji Adele. He was also a founding member and later chairman of the Island club. A sports enthusiast, he was vice president of the Nigerian Olympic and British Empire and Commonwealth Games Association and a trustee of the proposed National Stadium. Randle was the Chef de Mission of the Nigerian Olympic team to the 1956 Summer Olympics. He was awarded the medal of the Victorian Order. He took ill on his flight from Melbourne, and later died at Lagos General Hospital in December 1956.

He was chairman of the Lagos Race Club in 1956.
