= Orisadipe Obasa =

Nigerian medical doctor and politician

Omoba Orisadipe Obasa
- Born: January 1863; Freetown, Sierra Leone
- Died: 15 April 1940 (aged 77); Lagos, Nigeria
- Occupation: Doctor
- Known for: Being the co-founder of the People's Union
- Spouse: Charlotte Obasa
- Children: 5
- Relatives: Richard Beale Blaize (father-in-law); Akinola Maja (son-in-law); Lola Maja (great-granddaughter)

Orisadipe Obasa, (January 1863 – 15 April 1940) was a Nigerian doctor and prince who played a significant role in the politics of Lagos in the first decades of the 20th century.

== Early years ==
Orisadipe Obasa was born in January 1863 in Freetown, Sierra Leone, into an aristocratic Saro family. His paternal grandfather was the Oba Elekole of Ikole, Ekiti, and his mother was from the Abeokuta royal family of the Akija of Ikija. As a youth, Obasa moved to Lagos. In 1878, he was admitted as Senior Foundation Scholar to the newly opened Wesleyan Boys High School (now Methodist Boys High School, Lagos) where he excelled academically. He eventually served as first President of the Old Boys Association of his high school.

In 1883, his parents sent him to England to study medicine. He used the name George Stone Smith while in England. He was admitted to King's College, Taunton, where he again was a star pupil, and went on to St Thomas's Hospital Medical School in London. He graduated in 1891 with Membership of the Royal College of Surgeons and the Licentiate of the Royal College of Physicians.

== Career ==
In 1892, Obasa returned to Lagos and began a private medical practice. During the Anglo-Ashanti wars, towards the end of the 19th century, he served in an expedition of the Lagos Constabulary in the Gold Coast colony. He was awarded a medal for his services, and in 1900, was appointed Assistant Colonial Surgeon in the Lagos medical service. He played an important role in public health campaigns in the Lagos Colony and the interior of southern Nigeria.

== Personal life and politics ==
In 1902, Obasa married Charlotte Olajumoke, (Note: Charlotte Obasa was an entrepreneur and philanthropist who championed women's rights and education. In 1907 the Lagos School for Girls, later called the Wesleyan Girls' High School, was opened through her efforts in a property she lent the school. In 1913 she founded the first motor transport company in Lagos, and had three trucks, three taxis and six buses in operation by 1915.) daughter of the wealthy merchant Richard Beale Blaize, and was given a comfortable house as a wedding present. In 1903, he visited Ekiti during Governor William MacGregor's smallpox vaccination program. He made useful medical observations on subjects such as yaws, hookworm and inguinal hernias.

In 1904, Obasa resigned from his position as colonial surgeon so he could spend more time at home. He resumed his private practice and also plunged into politics. He was fluent in speech and writing, at ease with others, and had good family connections. In 1908, Obasa and Dr. John K. Randle founded the People's Union to agitate against the proposed water rates, which was the first political organisation in Nigeria. Obasa was secretary of the Union, while Randle was president. In 1911, Randle and Obasa seem to have travelled to London to make the case against Governor Frederick Lugard's proposal to declare that all lands were government property. The Union continued to oppose the new water rates until yielding in 1916. The People's Union and its leaders lost favour with the electorate thereafter. However, Obasa was nominated in 1921 to the Nigerian Legislative Council, where he was active on various committees.

At the time when the Nigerian National Democratic Party was founded in 1922 by Herbert Macaulay, the leaders of the People's Union were Randle, Obasa, Sir Kitoye Ajasa, Richard Akinwande Savage and Sir Adeyemo Alakija.

Obasa's wife led the Women's Union. Both Unions favoured a measured approach to reforms. They could not compete with NNDP. In September 1923, the first elections were held for the Legislative Council. Obasa ran but was defeated. Randle died in 1928 and Obasa took leadership of what was left of the People's Union.

At the time of the founding of the Reformed Ogboni Fraternity, he served as its inaugural Oluwo (or master). His wife, Charlotte, was at the same time made the Iya Abiye (or lady master) of the same group. They both led the nascent fraternity until their deaths.

Obasa contracted Parkinson's disease in 1926. As the disease progressed, he was increasingly incapacitated. He died, aged 77, in April 1940, at his Lagos home.

== Sources ==
- Adeloye, Adelola (1974). "Some early Nigerian doctors and their contribution to modern medicine in West Africa". Medical History. 18 (3): 275–293. doi:10.1017/s0025727300019621. PMC 1081580. PMID 4618303.
- Awa, Eme O. (1964). Federal Government in Nigeria. University of California Press. GGKEY:1QY5QRE1913.
- Azikiwe, Nnamdi (1961). ZIK A SELECTION FROM THE SPEECHES OF NNAMDI AZIKIWE Governor-General of the Federation of Nigeria formerly President of the Nigerian Senate formerly Premier of the Eastern Region of Nigeria. CUP Archive. GGKEY:DYUUN0FF6JS.
- Schoonmaker, Trevor (4 July 2003). Fela: From West Africa to West Broadway. Palgrave Macmillan. p. 13. ISBN 978-1-4039-6210-2.
- Sherwood, Marika (29 September 2014). "Two Pan-African Political Activists Emanating from Edinburgh University: Drs John Randle and Richard Akinwande Savage". Africa in Scotland, Scotland in Africa: Historical Legacies and Contemporary Hybridities. BRILL. ISBN 978-90-04-27690-1.
