= Charlotte Obasa =

Nigerian socialite and philanthropist

Oloori Charlotte Obasa
- Born: January 7, 1873; Lagos
- Died: 23 December 1953 (aged 80); Lagos
- Other name: Charlotte Blaize
- Occupation: Philanthropist
- Known for: Founding the Anfani bus service
- Spouse: Orisadipe Obasa
- Children: 5
- Parent(s): Richard Beale Blaize; Emily Cole
- Relatives: Akinola Maja (son-in-law); Lola Maja (great-granddaughter); Kofo, Lady Ademola (niece)

Charlotte Olajumoke Obasa (née Blaize; January 7, 1873 – December 23, 1953) was a Nigerian socialite and philanthropist. She was the daughter of the merchant R. B. Blaize and the wife of the physician Orisadipe Obasa.

== Early life ==
A Saro, Obasa was born as one of the children of Richard Beale Blaize (a wealthy and politically active businessman), and his wife, Emily Cole Blaize. Her formative years were spent in Lagos, where her father published the nationalist newspapers The Lagos Times and Gold Coast Colony Advertiser and The Lagos Weekly Times. She was very well educated, first at what is today the Anglican Girls' School in Lagos, then at an institution in England.

In 1902, she married the Saro prince Orisadipe Obasa. Her father gave the couple a new house as a wedding present; it came to be called Babafunmi House as a result. Obasa and her husband went on to have five children together.

== Career ==
An aunt of Kofo, Lady Ademola, Obasa was an entrepreneur and philanthropist who championed women's rights and education. In 1907, the Lagos School for Girls (later called the Wesleyan Girls' High School) was opened through her efforts in a property she lent the school. In 1913, she founded the first motor transport company in Lagos, the Anfani bus service, and had three trucks, three taxis and six buses in operation by 1915.

Obasa also served as a prominent esotericist. In 1914, she co-founded the Reformed Ogboni Fraternity, and was recognized as its first Iya Abiye, or lady master, in the same year.

In 1922, Obasa commissioned a portrait from the Nigerian artist Chief Aina Onabolu. More than a century later, it was part of the Nigerian Modernism exhibition at Tate Modern in Britain in 2025.

Obasa died in 1953.

== Sources ==
- Akintola, Akinbowale (1992). The Reformed Ogboni Fraternity (R.O.F.): The Origins And Interpretation Of Its Doctrines And Symbolism.
- George, Abosede (2014). Making modern girls: a history of girlhood, labor, and social development in colonial Lagos.
- Muritala, Monsuru (2019). Livelihood In Colonial Lagos.
- Schoonmaker, Trevor (2003). Fela: From West Africa to West Broadway.
