= Richard Gabriel Akinwande Savage =

Scottish soldier and physician (1903–1993)

- Born: 1903; Edinburgh, Scotland
- Died: 1993 (aged 89–90); Scotland
- Occupations: Physician; Military officer
- Known for: First person of West African heritage to receive a British Army commission
- Parents: Richard Akinwande Savage Sr (father); Maggie S. Bowie (mother)
- Relatives: Agnes Yewande Savage (sister)

Major Richard Gabriel Akinwande Savage (1903–1993) was a physician, soldier, and the first person of West African heritage to receive a British Army commission.

== Early life and family ==
He was born in 1903 at 15 Buccleugh Place, in Edinburgh, Scotland, of mixed ancestry to the prominent Nigerian doctor Richard Akinwande Savage of Sierra Leone Creole descent, who married a Scotswoman, Maggie Bowie. His sister, Agnes Yewande Savage, also played a pioneering role as the first West African woman to qualify as a medical doctor.

== Education ==
Savage studied medicine at the University of Edinburgh, graduated (MB, ChB) in 1926, qualified in 1927, and received his commission as a 2nd lieutenant on 23 September 1940, making him the first West African to be commissioned an officer in the British Army (Seth Anthony of Ghana, has been incorrectly referenced as the first West African to receive a commission in the British Army). In September 1941, Savage was promoted to the rank of captain. He served as a medical doctor in the Asian Theater of World War II, specifically in Burma, where he tended to wounded soldiers from Britain's contingent. Among the soldiers that Savage treated in Burma was Isaac Fadoyebo, a wounded Nigerian soldier in the Royal West African Frontier Force, who recounted the quality of care that Savage provided to him and other West African soldiers.

== Personal life ==
His first wife was Phyllis Frances Heroina Ribeiro, with whom he had two children (Margaret Yewande Savage and Miguel Babatunde Richard Savage) and who died in 1940. In 1954, he married Dora Janet Burman (née Falconer), a British fellow surgeon. He retired to Scotland, having found Africa "vexing", and died there in 1993.
