= Thomas Horatio Jackson =

Thomas Horatio Jackson (1879–1935) was a Nigerian newspaper editor and publisher, who has been called a "veritable titan of the Lagos Press". Jackson's career, like that of his father John Payne Jackson, has been said to "exemplify the militant and crusading zeal of the pioneer journalists" in Nigeria.

== Life ==
After his father died in 1915 Jackson became editor of the Lagos Weekly Record. In 1923 he was involved in the founding of the Nigerian National Democratic Party.

In 1925 Jackson was imprisoned for an article arguing that the Supreme Court judges were nothing more than tools of the executive.
