= Richard Akinwande Savage =

Nigerian physician, journalist and politician (1874–1935)

Richard Akiwande Savage
- Born: 1874; Lagos, Lagos Colony
- Died: 1935 (aged 60–61)
- Occupations: Physician, journalist
- Known for: Nigerian Spectator
- Spouse: Maggie S Bowie (m. 1899)
- Children: Richard Gabriel Akinwande Savage (son); Agnes Yewande Savage (daughter)

Richard Akiwande Savage (1874–1935) was a Nigerian physician, journalist and politician who was a prominent figure in the colonial era politics of Lagos.

== Early years ==
Richard Akinwande Savage was born in 1874, the son of a successful merchant in Lagos descended from Egba and Sierra Leone Creole families. He attended the University of Edinburgh where he studied medicine, served as an officer in the Afro-West Indian Society, edited the 1899–1900 Hand Book and was sub-editor of The Student. He attended the Pan-African conference in London in July 1900. He was the last African to be appointed to the colonial medical service, as an Assistant Colonial Surgeon, before the 1902 declaration by Joseph Chamberlain that in future the service would be restricted to Europeans. Savage worked for several years in Cape Coast in the Gold Coast (modern Ghana) as a government physician and as a private practitioner.

== Political activity ==
Savage was one of the leading members of the People's Union, founded in 1908 by John K. Randle (1855–1928). Among other members were Orisadipe Obasa (1863–1940), Kitoye Ajasa (1866–1937) and Adeyemo Alakija (1884–1952). Although the People's Union was controlled by men with conservative views, it attracted some professionals with progressive ideas, such as Ernest Ikoli (1893–1960), journalist and founder of the Nigerian Youth Movement.

The People's Union, which was in favour of gradual introduction of reforms, opposed the more radical and nationalist Nigerian National Democratic Party (NNDP), founded in 1922 by Herbert Macaulay. The People's Union dissolved in 1928 after Randle died.

Around 1914, Savage was among those who proposed the National Council of British West Africa (NCBWA). The NCBWA consisted of elites from across West Africa. The NCBWA emerged as a broad-based party in 1919 and held its first congress in Ghana in 1920. Among its demands were the establishment of a university, the appointment of Africans to senior civil service positions and greater African participation in the Legislative Councils of the British West African colonies.

Savage was a regular contributor to the Gold Coast Leader. In about 1915, he returned to Lagos, where he began to practise medicine privately, and continued to contribute to local newspapers. He later founded the Nigerian Spectator (1923–1930) and the Akibooni Press. He also set up the Lagos Committee of the NCBWA. After he failed to be nominated Egbaland representative on the Legislative Council, he broke up the NCBWA Lagos Committee. Around 1920, he was a founding member and secretary of the Egba Society.

== Private life ==
In 1899, Richard Akiwande Savage married Maggie Bowie, a Scottish woman, and had two children who followed his footsteps in the field of medicine: Major Richard Gabriel Akinwande Savage and Dr Agnes Yewande Savage.

== Death ==
Richard Akinwande Savage died in 1935.

== Sources ==
- Awa, Eme O. (1964). Federal Government in Nigeria. University of California Press. GGKEY:1QY5QRE1913.
- Britannica (1 October 2010). The History of Western Africa. Britannica Educational Publishing. ISBN 978-1-61530-399-1.
- Falola, Toyin (2002). Key Events in African History: A Reference Guide. Greenwood Publishing Group. p. 216. ISBN 978-0-313-31323-3.
- Sherwood, Marika (20 April 2012). Origins of Pan-Africanism: Henry Sylvester Williams, Africa, and the African Diaspora. Routledge. ISBN 978-0-415-63323-9.
- Sklar, Richard L. (2004). Nigerian Political Parties: Power in an Emergent African Nation. Africa World Press. ISBN 978-1-59221-209-5.
