= Island Club =

Multinational club in Nigeria

The Island Club is one of the oldest multinational clubs in Nigeria. Established on Friday, October 29, 1943, in Lagos Island, the club began as a cosmopolitan club comprising members of different nationalities, races, religions and political orientations. Adeyemo Alakija was the first president. The Island Club started with 50 Nigerians and foreign gentlemen, one of whom included the British Governor-General of Nigeria, Sir Arthur Richards. In its early stages of development, the club included such members of the Lagosian elite as politicians, lawyers, captains of industry, soldiers and other professionals.
