= Henry Rawlingson Carr =

Nigerian educator and administrator

- Born: 18 August 1863; Lagos state
- Died: 4 March 1945 (aged 81)
- Citizenship: Nigerian
- Occupation: Educator

Henry Carr (15 August 1863 – 1945) was a Nigerian educator and administrator. He was one of the most prominent West Africans in the late nineteenth and early twentieth century and was a member of the legislative council in Lagos from 1918–1924.

== Background and education ==
Henry Carr was born in the Colony of Lagos on 15 August 1863 to Amuwo Carr and Rebecca Carr, liberated Saro emigrants of Yoruba extraction. Amuwo Carr died in Abeokuta when Henry was seven years old, leaving Rebecca Carr in charge of young Henry's education. Henry attended Wesleyan School, Olowogbowo for his elementary education. He was sponsored by Reverend T.B. Thomas, a close friend of his mother, to attend Wesleyan High School in Freetown, British Sierra Leone for his secondary education. In Sierra Leone, he attended Fourah Bay College where he received an honours degree in 1880. He was the first graduate of the school to achieve the feat. He then went to England and signed up for courses at Lincoln's Inn, St. Mark's College, Chelsea, (now University of St Mark & St John) and the Royal College of Science, South Kensington. Thereafter, he graduated with an honors B.A. in mathematics and physical science at Durham University in 1882. In 1906 he took a B.C.L degree at Lincoln's Inn and in the same year was made Chancellor of the Diocese of Western Equatorial Africa. Henry Carr was married to the former Henrietta Robbin.

== Career in West Africa ==
He returned to Nigeria in 1885 and taught at the CMS Grammar School, Lagos until joining the Colonial Civil Service in 1889 as chief clerk in the Secretariat and sub-inspector of schools.

He was appointed inspector of schools in 1892 (becoming the first black man to do so) and assistant colonial secretary for native affairs in 1900. In Lagos, Nigeria, he continued to progress doing much work on the Board of Education, serving as director of education between 1906 and 1918, and became the Resident of the Colony of Nigeria in 1918. He appears to be the first black man under British colonial rule to achieve this position. Henry Carr was one of the few West Africans during the early twentieth century that broke barriers in colonial governance.

Before the Second World War, few Africans rose beyond the position of chief clerk in colonial administration. As the death rate of Europeans declined in west Africa, many expatriates came to the country and gained administrative positions, as the colonial officers readily accepted them and helped advance their careers. All of this further diminished the chances of West Africans to take more administrative responsibilities. Reasons given to limit the career advancement of Africans at the time were the suspicions British officials had about Africans' ethical disposition due to an earlier embezzlement case in Ghana. However, this was a single case, and some critics have questioned whether there were sinister motives behind the policy.

=== Career chronology ===
Dr. Henry Rawlinson Carr, B.A Dunelm (1882); M.A., B.C.L Dunelm by examination and private study (1906); Honorary D.C.L Dunelm (1934); I.S.O (1920); O.B.E. (1929); C.B.E (1934); school master, Lagos Grammar School (1885-1889); inspector of schools of the Colony of Lagos (1900 and 1903–1906); senior inspector of schools of the Western Provinces of the Protectorate of Southern Nigeria (1906-1915); chief inspector of schools of the Southern Provinces of Nigeria (1915-1928).

Commissioner (later renamed Resident) of the Colony of Lagos (1918-1924); member of the Honourable Society of Lincoln's Inn (registered 1909), worshipful chancellor of (Diocese of Western Equatorial) Africa (1906-1919) and of the Lagos Diocese (1920-1945), First vice president (the first president was Governor Sir William MacGregor) of the Lagos Institute for the Study of Arts and Letters etc.

Official member of the Board of Education of the Colony and Southern Provinces of Nigeria (1926-1945), of the Colony of Lagos School Committee 1913–45, of the Board of Advisers of Higher College, Yaba, (1934–44), of Queen's College, Lagos (1939–45), of the Assessment Committee for Rates and Taxes of Lagos Township (1929–37); of the Nigerian Legislative Council (1933–44).

Visitor and member of the Visiting Committee of Lagos Prisons (1925–37), member of the Board of Governors of Igbobi College, Yaba (1937-1945), "Architect" of Kings College, Lagos; book collector, matchless educationist, orator, musician, distinguished civil servant.

== Feud with Herbert Macaulay ==
It is unclear how the fierce hatred between Henry Carr and Herbert Macaulay developed however their disputes are well documented. Carr believed that Macaulay lacked integrity and was exploiting the House of Dosunmu for personal gain. In Carr's diaries, he writes of Macaulay "Among all human monsters with whom we have been brought into contact none has displayed the devilish ingenuity of this man", concluding that Macaulay was a "crooked mind and dangerous fool". Carr abhorred the political reality that Macaulay, who was barred from partaking in politics because of his criminal convictions, was a political kingmaker through Macaulay's control of the NNDP.

The level of the strife between both men was so caustic that in 1924, Macaulay published a malicious account titled "Henry Carr Must Go". In the slanderous publication, Macaulay falsely asserted that Carr's father, Amuwo Carr deserted his wife to settle in Abeokuta as a polygamist. This was untrue considering Amuwo Carr died in Abeokuta of poor health and was nearly blind. Macaulay's vicious attacks on Carr in the press framed the Lagosian public's perception of Carr as shy, distant, and aloof.

== The Henry Carr library and Carr's contribution to education in Nigeria ==
Like his political foe, Herbert Macaulay, Carr collected a voluminous collection of books (The Henry Carr Library), totaling 18,000 at his home called 'The Haven' in Tinubu Square, Lagos Island. Carr allowed school children within his residential vicinity to access his well-stocked library.

Carr's 18,000 book library, according to Hope Rossiter, showed marks of personal selection. Rossiter further noted that Carr "represented simply the heights of achievement by an African of ability who through all his life had no material advantage that is not available to every young man in Nigeria...It was because Carr...used his wide education and tremendous culture as a background and not as a profession, that he is, in Africa, so outstanding. He is a perfect example of the cultured man - the quite well read, well-behaved and completely educated and cultivated man". Carr's library was acquired by the Nigerian government and the 18,000 book collection was sent to the University College, Ibadan (which would later become University of Ibadan), forming the foundation library at that institution.

Carr also played an instrumental role in the set up of King's College Lagos. As Acting Director of Education with the British colonial government in Nigeria, Carr advised Governor Walter Egerton on the educational scheme to be implemented at King's College Lagos and convinced the London Board of Education that the institution was integral to Nigeria's development.
