= Akinola Maja =

Nigerian medical doctor, businessman, philanthropist and politician

Chief Akinola Maja
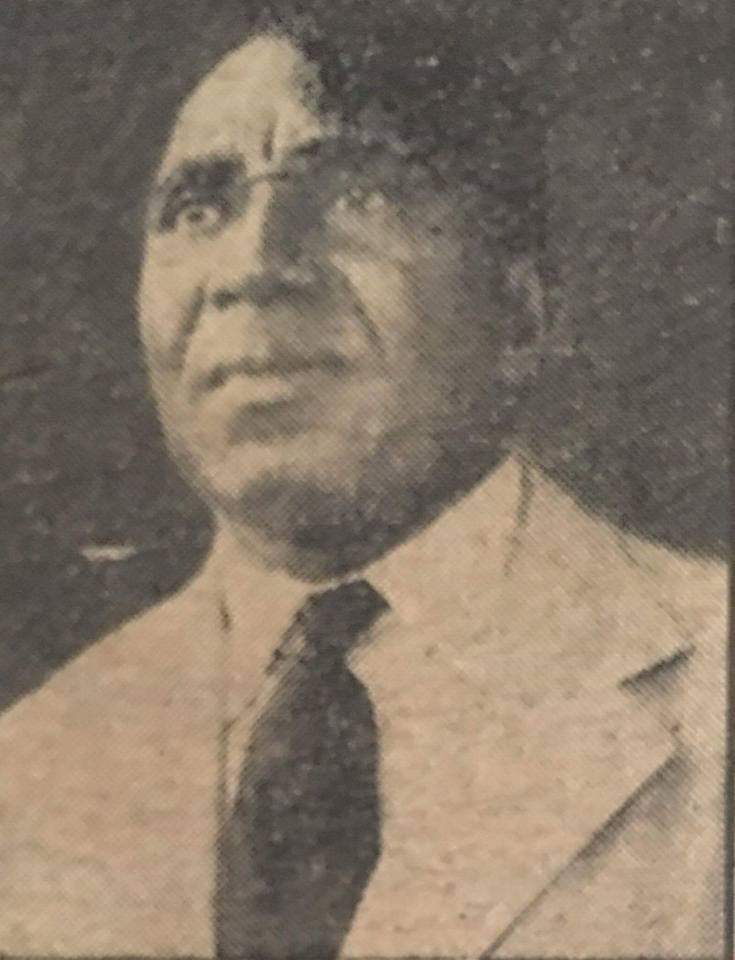
- Born: Sope Akinola Pearce; Lagos, Nigeria
- Died: 1976
- Occupations: Medical doctor; businessman; politician
- Spouse: Comfort Obasa Maja
- Father: James Adaramaja Pearce
- Relatives: Lola Maja (granddaughter)

Chief Akinola Maja was a Nigerian medical doctor, businessman, philanthropist and politician who was president of the Nigerian Youth Movement from 1944 to 1951. He later became president of the Egbe Omo Oduduwa in 1953.

Chief Maja held the chieftaincy titles of the Baba Eko (Father of Lagos in Yorùbá) and the Jagunmolu of Orile-Ijaiye.

A medical doctor by training, he graduated in 1918 from the University of Edinburgh in Edinburgh, Scotland, and stayed in the U.K. for the next three years before returning to Nigeria in 1921. He briefly worked for the colonial government before going into private practice to set up his own clinic.

== Life ==
Akinola Maja was born Sope Akinola Pearce. His father, James Adaramaja Pearce, was a carpenter, while his mother was a bread seller. The popular Breadfruit Street in his native Lagos is named so because of his mother's vocation. The Pearces belonged to the ascendant Saro community.

Maja's father died young, and he was picked as the one child to be extensively educated and look after the rest of the family thereafter. His mother saved enough money to send him to school overseas. He arrived in Scotland shortly thereafter.

A significant event in Maja's life occurred in 1918, where he was discriminated on the basis of his race. Maja had excelled academically and was due to be awarded a prize for best student at the graduation ceremony. His fellow students and the visiting guests were surprised to see that the best-performing student in the year was actually Nigerian, being mistaken by his surname. Maja was made to wait as the faculty confirmed that he had indeed won the prize for his academic results. Upon seeing the negative reaction to a black man winning the prize among his fellow students, Maja decided to renounce his foreign surname and shortened his father's middle name Adaramaja to Maja as a replacement. He also took an oath that none of his descendants would have non-Nigerian surnames, a tradition which is still carried on today by the male members of the Maja family.

Upon his return to what was then Colonial Nigeria, Maja worked in the civil service for a time. Unsatisfied with the career prospects that this offered him, he eventually established a private practice in Lagos.

In 1933, Maja was one of the founders of the National Bank of Nigeria, along with T.A. Doherty, Olatunde Johnson and Hamzat Subair. The bank was a durable African institution that later developed a close relationship with the Action Group political party. Some of the bank's founders where affiliated with the National Youth Movement, and they later established Service Press, the publishers of the Daily Service newspaper. Daily Service began operations as a mouth piece of the NYM. During the decade preceding Nigeria's independence, Maja was involved in a number of business ventures with varying degrees of success. In the early 1950s, he co-founded a ceramic venture in Ikorodu in partnership with Sule Gbadamosi. He was also a director of the National Investment and Properties Company used by the Action Group as a source of campaign finance.

Maja was married to Chief Comfort Obasa Maja, a daughter of Prince Orisadipe Obasa. Chief Obasa Maja was the Erelu Kuti of Lagos, a chieftaincy title that made her the reigning queen mother of that kingdom.

Maja had four children. The Majas lived at Garber Square, in one of the earliest two-storey buildings in Nigeria, and their residence is now part of the Lagos street tour due to its historical importance. His son, Dr. Oladipo Maja was a well-known doctor and philanthropist who set up the Maja Eye Hospital, whose charitable arm recruited the services of prominent ophthalmic surgeons to carry out free surgery for the blind and visually impaired.

Maja died in 1976 at the age of 88.
