= Lagos Town Council =

The Lagos Town Council was a local government body founded in 1917. At inception, it primarily dealt with municipal health and sanitary issues and the implementation of a water tenement rate. In 1950, a new local government law created a mayoral council that was composed of 24 elected councilors, this system lasted until 1953. In 1963, the town council became known as the Lagos City Council.

== History ==
The Lagos Town Council came into existence after the passage of a 1917 township ordinance designating parts of Lagos Island, Iddo, Apapa, and Ebute Metta as Lagos township to be administered by a town council. Upon introduction, the council took over the activities of a general sanitary and municipal health board, and was charged to regulate and issue licenses concerning public markets, liquor sales, and motor vehicles, in addition, the issuance of a water tenement rate, and animal control regulations came under the purview of the new council. At inception, the council had nominated members until 1919, when structural changes paved the way for the election of three members, each representing their respective wards, while other members were appointed by the governor. In 1923, the Nigerian National Democratic Party was formed in part to present candidates every five years to the Legislative Council and every three years to the Lagos Town Council. In 1941, administrative changes gave the council the ability to levy taxes.

=== Mayoral system (1950 - 1953) ===
Structural reforms were made in 1950 following the enactment of the Lagos Local Government Ordinance 17, the reforms included the creation of an all elected membership and the introduction of the position of Mayor of Lagos. The new law made provision for 24 elected members voted by men and woman ages 21 and over. Between 1950 and 1952, the council was majority led by the 'Demo' party, also known as the Nigerian National Democratic Party, a wing of NCNC, the party selected Ibiyinka Olorunimbe as Lagos' first mayor and Mbonu Ojike as Deputy Mayor. However, the political atmosphere was tense, there was the issue of an appropriate salary for the Mayor and when the Mcpherson constitution placed parts of Lagos under the purview of the Western regional government, then majority led by the Action Group, a regional law was enacted stating that major appointment decisions made by the council were needed to be ratified by the Lieutenant Governor. However, the council did meets many of its legal obligations, also supported urban renewal plans including the development of estates in Surulere, slum clearance on Lagos Island and a proposal for a free education program at Oke Suna.

In 1953, the position of Mayor was abolished and opportunity was given to the traditional institution in Lagos to be represented in the council. The Oba of Lagos, was made council president

=== 1954-1963 ===
In 1954, the Action Group had majority members in the council and dominated the council until it was renamed the Lagos City Council.
