= Mojola Agbebi =

Nigerian Baptist minister (1860–1917)

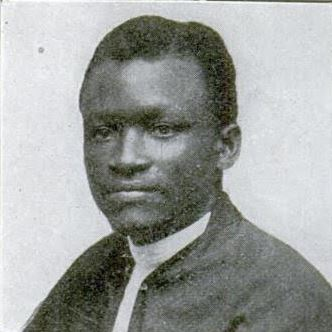
- Born: David Brown Vincent; 1860
- Died: 1917 (aged 56–57)
- Occupation: Minister

Mojola Agbebi (1860–1917) was a Nigerian Yoruba Baptist minister. He was formerly named David Brown Vincent, but during the wave of African nationalism in the late 1880s, he changed his name. Agbebi was a strong advocate of indigenous leadership for African churches. He initiated evangelistic work in Yorubaland and in the Niger Delta.

Agbebi was the son of a Yoruba Anglican catechist, and was born shortly after his "Saro" father returned from Sierra Leone to his homeland with the gospel. He left the CMS (the Church Missionary Society) in 1880 and became a Baptist around 1883. He played a prominent role in the March 1888 establishment of the Native Baptist Church (now the First Baptist Church) in Lagos, which was the first indigenous church in West Africa.

Agbebi was a part of Ebenezer Baptist Church, Lagos, which was formed as result of a dispute within the First Baptist Church when American missionary Rev. W. J. David fired Rev. Moses Ladejo Stone, the native pastor. David rebuffed requests for an explanation by a delegation and by the church business meeting, claiming that he had the authority to dismiss Stone.

Agbebi was an apostle of ecumenism. In 1898 he founded the African Baptist Union of West Africa, and in 1914 he started the Yoruba Baptist Association. He also supported his wife's efforts in establishing the nationwide Baptist Women's League in 1919. He was also politically active, and presented a paper at the 1911 First Universal Races Congress in London.
