= Samuel Herbert Pearse =

Nigerian businessman (1865–1953)

- Born: November 20, 1865; Lagos
- Died: 1953 (aged 87–88); Lagos
- Education: C.M.S Grammar School
- Occupation: Businessman
- Parent: Rev. S. Pearse (father)

Samuel Herbert Pearse, F.R.C.I. (born November 20, 1865, died 1953) was a pioneer Nigerian shipper and produce exporter of Sierra Leone Creole and Egba heritage. He established the first Hotel in Lagos in 1907. He was also a member and secretary of the Lagos branch of the Anti-Slavery and Aborigines Protection Society.

== Life and career ==
He was born on November 20, 1865, to the family of Reverend Samuel Pearse of the Church Missionary Society. He attended C.M.S. Grammar School, Lagos for secondary education and started work as an apprentice in 1883.

In 1888, he teamed up with Sierra Leonean businessman, I. Thompson and the two began trading in Lagos and London. However, both men parted ways in 1894. Pearse soon started his own trading account in Calabar and Lagos and also became an agent for the African and Gold Coast Trading Company.

He made extensive wealth trading in palm produce from the Old Calabar province as one of the pioneer Nigerian exporters of goods. He acquired a large steamship prior to World War I, and succeeded in the lucrative shipping market dominated regionally by the Elder Dempster company. He later delved into the rubber business in Benin and focused more on importing goods.

== Descendants ==
Counted amongst Mr. Pearse's descendants is the award-winning Nollywood actress Joke Silva, his great-granddaughter.
