= Lola Maja =

Nigerian make-up artist

- Born: 26 January 1978 (age 48); Lagos, Nigeria
- Citizenship: Nigeria, United Kingdom
- Occupation: Make-up Artist
- Years active: 1992–present
- Spouse: Tonio Okojevoh (m. 2010)
- Children: 2

Lola Maja (born Omolola Maja; 26 January 1978), also known as Lola Maja-Okojevoh, is a Nigerian make-up artist; her specialties include special effects, eyebrows and eyelashes. She is the founder and Chief Executive Officer of "Sacred Beauty" & "The SFX Store". She is known for working on major fashion events and films such as The Figurine and October 1, as well as several music videos. She has done make-up for celebrities including Genevieve Nnaji and Tiwa Savage. She has worked with fashion magazines such as Style Mania and FAB, as well as models like Iman and Tyson Beckford. In 2015, she won the "Best Make-up" award at the Africa Magic Viewers Choice Awards for the film "October 1".

== Background and early life ==
Maja was born in Lagos, to a Yoruba father and a mother with Itsekiri, Italian, Scottish and Lebanese ancestry. She is the granddaughter of Nigerian founding father Akinola Maja and his wife Comfort, who was herself the Erelu Kuti of Lagos. At the age of 2, Maja and her family moved to the United Kingdom where she was raised. She moved back to Nigeria in 2010, after getting married.

== Career ==
Maja started working as a makeup artist at age 14 whilst still in high school and continued into college. By age 18, she was made to choose between continuing her degree or leaving to take a role as a makeup artist on the launch team for Iman Cosmetics at their flagship counter in London. She decided on the latter and launched Iman Cosmetics in 1997. She then launched her own lashes range "Sacred Lashes" in 2010 and The SFX Store in 2016.

Maja returned to school to get formal qualifications in beauty therapy. She graduated from the London College of Beauty Therapy, then went on to St. Mary's University College, Twickenham where she obtained a Teaching Diploma. She launched a "Beauty Academy" in 2013.

Maja's make-up work includes special effects, bridal, and creative fashion. In music video My Darlin, she transformed singer Tiwa Savage into an old lady using makeup. She did Genevieve Nnaji's make up for the photoshoot of her clothing line St.Genevieve. She also worked as a Beauty Editor for major fashion magazines like Style Mania, FAB and Noir. Her make-up work has appeared in popular magazines, including TW, Genevieve Magazine, True Love, Elan, Black Hair & Beauty, Colors, Pride, Sideview, and Trendsetter. She has worked with models like Iman and Tyson Beckford. Other celebrities she has worked with include: Alek Wek, Ernie Hudson, Joe Estevez, Joe, Dru Hill, Ojy Okpe, Fifi Ejindu, Genevieve Nnaji, Omotola Jalade, Rita Dominic, Kate Henshaw, Tiwa Savage, Omawumi, Waje, Toolz, Toke Makinwa, Eku Edewor.

Maja did the make-up for five of Kunle Afolayan's films, including The Figurine (2009) and October 1 (2014); the latter for which she won the 2015 Africa Magic Viewers Choice Award for "Best Make-up". She was also the make-up artist for the third and fourth season of the television drama series Shuga. Maja has also worked on several music videos, such as Wizkid's "Tease Me", Banky W’s "Lagos Party", Omawumi’s "Today Na Today" and Dr SID’s "Something About You". Maja is also a regular guest on television lifestyle shows & radio, where she talks about beauty, fashion and makeup advice while commenting on the latest trends in fashion.

== Personal life ==
Maja met her husband, Tonio Okojevoh, at a cousin's wedding. She was engaged to another person at the time. She became friends with Tonio and after six years, he proposed, without prior dating. Maja has stated that she and her husband were celibate before they got married, a decision that her husband initiated, as his promise to God. Tonio and Lola got married in 2010; together, they have two children, Tega and Tallulah, born in 2011 and 2013 respectively. She once shared that whilst she was in labour with her first child, listening to "Bumper to Bumper" by Wande Coal helped to ease her labour pains. She has also made it known that she won't be having anymore children.

== Filmography ==
=== Film and television ===
Year	Work	Role	Notes
2009	The Figurine	make-up, hair, special effects, cameo	
2012	Turning Point	make-up, hair, special effects	
2013	Flower Girl	make-up, hair, special effects	
2013	Shuga (season 3)	make-up, hair	
2014	Render to Caesar	make-up, special effects	
2014	October 1	make-up, hair, special effects	
2015	Shuga (season 4)	make-up, hair	
2015	Fifty	make-up, hair, special effects	
2016	The C.E.O.	make-up, hair, special effects	

== Awards and nominations ==
Year	Award ceremony	Prize	Result	Ref
2015	2015 Africa Magic Viewers Choice Awards	Best Make-up Artist	Won	
