= John Payne Jackson =

Americo-Liberian journalist (1848–1915)

- Born: 25 March 1848; Cape Palmas, Liberia
- Died: 1 August 1915 (aged 67); Lagos
- Occupation: Journalist
- Known for: Lagos Weekly Record

John Payne Jackson (25 March 1848 – 1 August 1915) was an Americo-Liberian journalist, born in Liberia who was influential in Lagos, Nigeria around the turn of the 20th century. He edited and published the Lagos Weekly Record from 1891 until his death. This was a well-written and informative paper that discussed and analysed current events. It took an anti-colonialist, African nationalist position that made it unpopular with the authorities and also with some of the Nigerian elite.

== Early years ==
John Jackson was born on 25 March 1848 in Cape Palmas, Liberia. His father, Thomas John Jackson, had migrated to that colony in Liberia from Maryland, US. His mother may have also come from Maryland. His father was a town councilor, judge and Methodist preacher who died when John Jackson was four years old. Jackson was educated at the Training Institute in Cape Palmas, run by Bishop John Payne.

At first Jackson wanted to be a merchant. After travelling throughout West Africa, in the late 1860s he found work with the prominent Lagos merchant J. S. Leigh and was sent to the Brass River in the 1870s to manage Leigh's station there. Jackson branched into trading palm products on his own account, but was forced out of business by European competitors, an experience that may have affected his outlook towards Europeans.

In 1882 he obtained a job keeping books for the Lagos Times. Richard Beale Blaize had founded the Lagos Times and Gold Coast Colony Advertiser in 1880. Jackson was soon dismissed from the Lagos Times for drunkenness. He seems to have lived after that by working as local agent for British companies such as Dorling and Co. and Edward Chancillor.

The Lagos Times had foundered in 1882 but was relaunched in 1890 as The Weekly Times. Jackson had persuaded Blaize to let him run the paper. Ladapo Samuel Ademola became Jackson's assistant that year. Later he would become Alake of Abeokuta. The first edition of the Lagos Weekly Times appeared on 3 May 1880. The writing quality was excellent, but Jackson continued to drink and the finances were chaotic. Although he was given much leeway, eventually Blaize closed down the Weekly Times on 29 November 1880, and began to publish the Lagos Times from 6 December 1890. Jackson tried to continue with the Weekly Times, but after threats of legal action agreed to change the name of his paper to the Lagos Weekly Record, starting in 1881.

== Lagos Weekly Record editor ==
Jackson managed to find support for his paper, possibly from the prosperous local physician John K. Randle. At the time the Weekly Record was launched Lagos still had just 35,000 people, but was cosmopolitan and rapidly growing due to trade in palm oil and other products. There was a small European population of no more than 150 officials, merchants and missionaries. Although the largest African ethnic group was Yoruba, there were also repatriate former slaves from Brazil and Sierra Leone, Hausa, Fante, Nupe and many other peoples. Jackson closely observed current events, and gave insightful commentary to his readers. At this time the hypocrisy of the Christian missionaries and the racial bigotry and arrogance of European colonialists were fueling a movement of African cultural and political nationalism, for which Jackson became the main spokesman. Despite his problems with drink and money management, Jackson was articulate and scholarly. His writing combined incisive rhetoric with broad learning, and used apposite quotations from a wide variety of sources.

Jackson supported the local leaders in Dahomey in their resistance to the French colonial powers, and sympathized with the leaders in what is now Nigeria in their struggles to retain their independence. He became a friend of Nana Olomu of Itsekiri-land, and after Nana's surrender to the British in Lagos published a long interview with Nana. After Nana's trial and deportation Jackson kept the issue alive, and backed a campaign for his release, which eventually occurred in 1906.

Jackson was also a great admirer of the Mandingo leader Samori Ture in his resistance to the French, and named his press and his premises at the Marina after Somory. He helped ensure that the Triumvirate government in Yorubaland was replaced by the Egba United Government in 1893, and became one of the main advisors of the Alake Gbadebo I.

Jackson supported the colonial authorities during the 1892 Anglo-Ijebu War. This attitude seems inconsistent with his nationalist views, but may be explained by the expectation that after the British had imposed peace they would withdraw. Other striking inconsistencies in his paper's attitude toward colonialist actions may perhaps by explained by Jackson yielding at times to strong pressure from the government and European community, on whom his paper depended for existence. In the early days Jackson depended on a government contract given to the newspaper by Governor Gilbert Thomas Carter. Carter's administration subsidised the Lagos Weekly Record at an annual rate of about £150 on the pretext of buying advertising space.

Jackson hired Owen Emerick Macaulay's printing press, and then used the press of J. Bagan Benjamin. In the mid-1890s he was able to purchase a second-hand press from England. During the 1890s the Record sold 600 hand-printed copies per week on average, which made it the most popular newspaper in Lagos. Until Carter left the colony the paper managed to combine an African nationalist message with support for the governor. In 1897 Henry McCallum arrived as the new governor, and the paper became less and less friendly to the administration. The advertising contract was cancelled in 1900. In January 1904 the Record moved from Broad Street to a new permanent office in Samadu Quarters at the Marina.

During the period before World War I (1914–18) the British were steadily increasing their control of what became the Colony and Protectorate of Nigeria, and taking power from what had been independent local rulers. They were also overhauling land tenure laws, causing serious concerns by the African population over changes to their long-standing land ownership and occupation practices. Jackson expressed these concerns eloquently, pointing out that the Europeans were trying to impose their own standards without understanding the situation, and were treating privately held lands as it they were public. Land management was communal, but ownership was individual. Also, the system in the northern emirates was quite different from that in the south. Other issues included the Forestry Ordinance and the Native Councils Ordinance. In an atmosphere verging on crisis in 1905 Jackson wrote,

Under the new order of things introduced into West Africa two points of view have evolved; the European point of view and the Native point of view both of which are the natural and inevitable outcome of the existing conditions and represent a set of systems, ideas and modes of life quite dissimilar and liable to conflict with each other. The European point of view is not only given emphasis by both pen and voice but finds expression also in the direction, aim and purpose of civilized life in West Africa vociferously. On the other hand, the Native point of view is seldom voiced as is on the whole accorded but scant recognition. Our aim is to give greater prominence to the Native point of view feeling confident that no solid progress can be made in any direction without there being a thorough comprehension on both sides of the views held by each and a united effort to bring these into reconciliation when they happen to clash or differ.

Jackson and Herbert Samuel Heelas Macaulay were the leaders of the growing nationalist movement in Nigeria by 1914. Their ambitious objectives and rabble-rousing approach were viewed with hostility by both the government and the leading members of the African elite. In July 1912 Jackson was chosen as the leader of the five-person delegation that toured Yorubaland for five months, holding open and closed meetings with the people and leaders. The Record gave in-depth coverage of the meetings. Kitoye Ajasa (1866–1937) founded the Nigerian Pioneer in 1914 as an alternative to the radical Weekly Record. Because he was known to be a confidant of Governor-General Frederick Lugard, 1st Baron Lugard (1858–1945), it was widely thought that the government funded the paper.

Jackson had contracted a disease during the Yorubaland tour that paralysed his legs, and forced him to retire. In January 1914 his son Thomas Horatio Jackson (1879–1935) succeeded his father at the Lagos Weekly Record. John Payne Jackson died on 1 August 1915.

== Opinions ==
Jackson had been influenced by Edward Wilmot Blyden's Christianity, Islam, and the Negro Race, with its message of cultural and political nationalism. Jackson thought that contact with Europeans was resulting in racially degenerate Africans. He praised traditional values, saying: "there can be no doubt that there is more happiness to be found for man in the simple and contented life of the African than in all the inventions and contrivances of Europe." He said that Africans should exploit European influences to civilize themselves, but must retain contact with the racially pure tribes. He said, "Put the aborigines well in front, go back to the simplicity of your fathers—go back to health and life and continuity." In May 1909 Jackson wrote an article entitled "The Emasculation of the Civilized Native" in which he said:

To the native mind which is able to emerge from beneath the cloak of blind fatuity with which the civilized native is enveloped, nothing stands out in greater relief than the paralysation and complete emasculation which afflict the native under the spell of his so-called civilized life. Imbued through the course of his training with his conditions of life and surrounding, he is disqualified for fulfilling the first requirement of his existence namely adaptation to environment... out of accord with the fundamental law of man's existence, the Europeanized native is cut off from the springs of human vitality ... and presents the anomaly of a monstrous contradiction upon the fixed order of human life. ... in his thoughtless and persistent pursuit of a life which reason and every other faculty of the human senses tell him is fatal to him, the civilized native is exhibiting a lamentable mental incapacity.

At first Jackson was strongly opposed to polygamy, but later he changed his opinions and became a strong supporter. This drew some criticism. Jackson was hostile to the Christian missionaries, and held Islam to be a superior religion. He wrote in 1893:

While the Moslem African develops into a mosque-creating, self-reliant propagandist, the Christian Africans blossom into "House" builders and apron string saints. Islam has produced munificent Africans, liberal, generous, public spirited men, and that even locally. Christianity ... has produced but money grabbers, close fisted, grovelling, sneaking men and usurers.

On the land management issue, Jackson wrote in September 1912:

It can hardly be said to be reasonable ... to take the laws of one set of people to define the laws of another set of people whose customs and usage are quite different; nor is it rational to set up the law and its interpretation of one community as a standard by which the law of another community is to be governed. The life of the native of west Africa is of a communal order. The life of the European in Europe and elsewhere is individualistic. The law of the African must naturally conform to the communistic principle ... to contend that ownership does not exist in the one case because it does not take the form it assumes in the other, is equivalent to divesting the word ownership of all meaning.

== Legacy ==
The pioneer African patriot, Edward Wilmot Blyden, called Jackson "an able man" with "very strong race feelings." On the tenth anniversary of his death a Yoruba-language newspaper called him "a field marshal, philosopher and evangelist." The Jackson College of Journalism (now the Department of Mass Communication) was established at the University of Nigeria, Nsukka in 1961. It was named after John Payne Jackson and his son Horatio Jackson, who took over the Lagos Weekly Record after the death of his father. In 2006 the journal of the Department of Mass Communication was renamed The Jacksonite.

- Devilization* - invented word attributed to John Payne Jackson

"Devilization" is a pun on Civilization and represents its antithesis. The word is a native African product, first seeing the light in "The Lagos Weekly Record", invented to describe the veneer of civilization imposed on natives of Africa at the White's point of contact with them. This Lagos publicist John Payne Jackson (1848-1915) finds that"after a century of trial it is fitting that the native should call a halt, and in his own interest take stock of the result of this foreign system imposed on him".

Extract from an article titled "Devilization in Africa" from Dakota County Herald dated 22 May 1908

== Sources ==
- Ezera, Kalu (1960). Constitutional Developments in Nigeria: An Analytical Study of Nigeria's Constitution-making Developments and the Historical and Political Factors that Affected Constitutional Change. CUP Archive. GGKEY:2UE57755F5G.
- "History of the Department of Mass Communication". University of Nigeria.
- Hogan, Edmund M. (2013). Cross and Scalpel: Jean-Marie Coquard Among the Egba of Yorubaland. African Books Collective. ISBN 978-978-081-287-4.
- July, Robert W. (2004). "John Payne Jackson and the Assertion of African Culture". The Origins of Modern African Thought: Its Development in West Africa During the Nineteenth and Twentieth Centuries. Africa World Press. ISBN 978-1-59221-199-9.
- Obichere, Boniface I. (2005-07-27). Studies in Southern Nigerian History: A Festschrift for Joseph Christopher Okwudili Anene 1918-68. Routledge. ISBN 978-1-135-78108-8.
- Omu, Fred I. A. (December 1974). "Journalism and the Rise of Nigerian Nationalism: John Payne Jackson, 1848-1915". Journal of the Historical Society of Nigeria. 7 (3). Historical Society of Nigeria: 521–539. JSTOR 41857035.
- Sklar, Richard L. (2004). Nigerian Political Parties: Power in an Emergent African Nation. Africa World Press. ISBN 978-1-59221-209-5.
