= Adeyemo Alakija =

Nigerian lawyer, politician and businessman

Oloye Sir Adeyemo Alakija K.B.E.
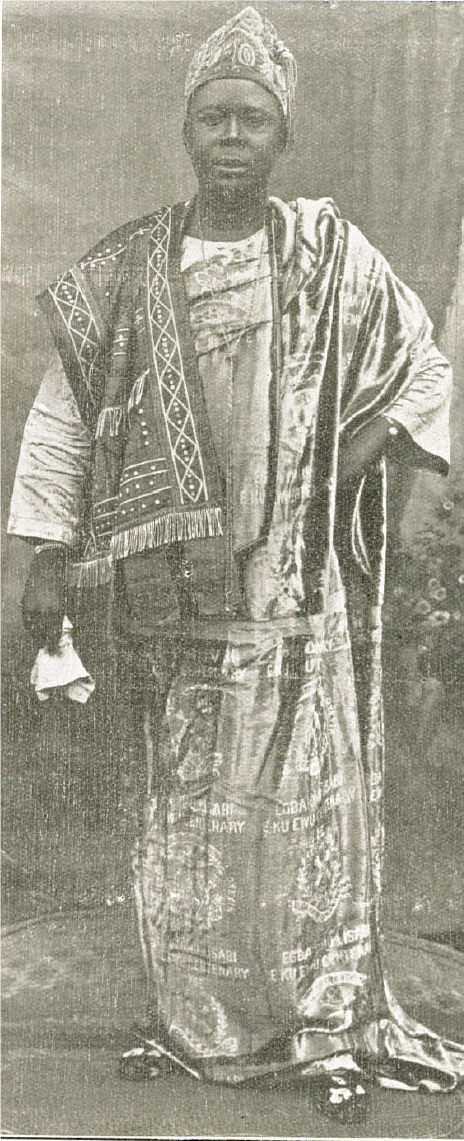

Member of Nigeria Legislative Council
- In office 1933–1942

President of Egbe Omo Oduduwa
- In office 1948–1952

Personal details
- Born: Placido Assumpcao; 25 May 1884
- Died: 10 May 1952 (aged 67)
- Citizenship: Nigerian
- Spouse: Christina Ayodele George (m. 1907; died 1938)
- Children: Aduke Alakija, amongst others
- Parents: Marculino Assumpcao (father); Maximilliana Assumpcao (mother)
- Relatives: Kofi Annan (son-in-law); Kojo Annan (grandson); Olayinka Taiwo Alakija and Adeyemo Kehinde Alakija (identical twins born in 1981) (grandsons)
- Education: Oxford University
- Occupation: Politician; Lawyer; Businessman

Oloye Sir Adeyemo Alakija, KBE (25 May 1884 – 10 May 1952) was a Nigerian lawyer, politician and businessman. He served as a member of the Nigerian legislative council for nine years starting in 1933. In 1942, he became a member of the governor's Executive Council. Alakija was president of Egbe Omo Oduduwa from 1948 until his death in 1952.

Alakija's collaboration with Herbert Macaulay and Egerton Shyngle early in his political career brought him prominence but after falling out with Macaulay and because of his moderate political views, his popularity began to wane until the early 1950s when he had begun to develop favour in the eyes of the public. Alakija developed close relationships with many organizations and communities among whom were the Lebanese and Syrian community in Nigeria, he was decorated with a medal of the cedars after his visit to Lebanon in 1949.

He held the chieftaincy titles of the Lisa of Egbaland and the Woje Ileri of Ile-Ife.

== Early life and education ==
Alakija was born to the family of Marculino (sometimes called Elemeji) and Maxmilliana Assumpcao; he was the youngest of the seven children in the family. His father was of Egba ancestry and his mother was the daughter of Alfa Cyprian Akinosho Tairu of Oyo. His eldest brother Maxwell Porphyrio Assumpcao-Alakija was a barrister in Bahia and father in-law of Sir Olumuyiwa Jibowu, and one of his brothers (who went on to become his law partner) was Olayimika Alakija, a sometime member of the Nigerian Legislative Council. An elder sister, Tejumade Assumpcao, became Olori Tejumade Alakija Ademola, Lady Ademola when she married Sir Ladapo Ademola, the Alake of Egbaland, her family's ancestral homeland. Alakija attended St Gregory's Catholic School before moving to CMS Grammar School, Lagos. He later studied at Oxford University in the early 1930s, and became an ardent proponent for the provision of tertiary education to Nigerians during the colonial period.

After finishing his secondary education, Alakija started work in the post office in 1900 and served in the civil service for ten years. He then proceeded to study Law in London, earning his qualification in 1913, and thereafter opened a law practice in Lagos. His law firm was successful but his foray into elective politics met opposition from Herbert Macaulay, a former friend of his whose politics diverged as a result of the Lagos Eleko crisis. Alakija was opposed to Eshugbayi Eleko, the Oba of Lagos and the Oba's supporters including the Jamat Muslims and Macaulay. He was a candidate in the 1923 legislative elections but lost. However, from 1933 to 1941, he was a nominated member representing Egba division in the Legislative Council. He was also the first president of the Island Club...

== Career ==
Sir Adeyemo Alakija was a newspaper entrepreneur who co-founded the Daily Times of Nigeria with Ernest Ikoli and Richard Barrow, who was the president of the Lagos Chamber of Commerce. The newspaper flourished with the support of advertising revenue from expatriate companies and despite its pro-government stance. Alakija assumed the chairmanship of the paper's publishing arm, the Nigerian Printing and Publishing Company. He was also a member of the governor's executive council and was president of the Nigerian Youth Movement. He was heavily influenced by the tidal waves of cultural nationalism in Nigeria during the early twentieth century. It was this self-assertiveness that led his family to abandon their assimilated Portuguese name in favour of a native one, Alakija, in 1913. Towards the end of his life it culminated in his ascending to the aristocracy of his tribe, as he was created the Bariyun of the Ake Lineage of Egbaland and the Woje Ileri of Ile-Ife. The Oloye Alakija, whose first name originally was Placido, was of Afro-Brazilian descent like many freed slaves resident in Lagos. The groups were sometimes called Amaros. The Alakija family for a while were the most prominent Amaros in Nigeria.

In Nigeria, he embraced some traditional elements of Yoruba socio-political and religious history when he co-founded the Reformed Ogboni Fraternity and became the Olori Oluwo, or "Grandmaster", of the brotherhood. As a member of the confraternity, he introduced the use of masonic symbols inside the organization, such as the unblinking eye on an inverted V and three vertical shapes. He was himself also a freemason of high rank.

Alakija was influential in the development of Egbe Omo Oduduwa and later the Action Group and was donor to both organizations.

Alakija died in the early hours of May 10, 1952. The night before, he had attended a dinner hosted by Sir Mobolaji Bank Anthony.

== Personal life ==
Alakija married Christina Ayodele George in 1907. George died in 1938, and he later took on another wife, Lady Ayodele. Alakija sent most of his children from his first wife to Britain for education. One of them, his only daughter, was Aduke Alakija. One of his sons, Babatunde, was a British Public School High Jump champion and one of the first Africans to be enrolled for training as a pilot. Another son, Oluwole Ayodele Alakija, was the former president of WASU in London and a member of Egbe Omo Oduduwa. Chief Alakija was a founding member and president of the Island Club of Lagos and was a founding member and Vice President of the Nigeria Football Association in 1933. His grandson is Kojo Annan, a Ghanaian businessman and son of former UN Secretary-General Kofi Annan.
