= Nigerian National Democratic Party =

Nigeria's first political party

- Founder: Herbert Macaulay
- Founded: 24 June 1923
- Ideology: Nigerian nationalism

The Nigerian National Democratic Party (NNDP) was the first political party in Nigeria. The party was active in Lagos and was supported by the Lagos Daily Newspaper.

== History ==
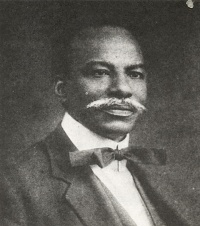
Herbert Macaulay, the party's founder

The NNDP was founded in on 24 June 1923 by Herbert Macaulay, the party's first leader. The party was created to take advantage of the new Clifford Constitution, which succeeded the 1914 Nigerian Council. The NNDP successfully organized various Lagos interest groups into a single group that was able to compete politically. The (NNDP) ran many candidates for seats in the 1922 elections for the Lagos Legislative Council, winning three seats.

The party won all the seats in the elections of 1923, 1928 and 1933. Though, the party's major function was to put candidates into the legislative council, it had a broader objective of promoting democracy in Nigeria, increasing higher Nigerian participation in the social, economic and educational development of Nigeria. The party continued to dominate politics in Lagos until 1938, when the Nigerian Youth Movement (NYM) overtook it in elections.

== Legacy ==
The party's name was adopted in 1964 by Samuel Akintola for his party as part of a process of unseating the left-leaning Action Group led by Obafemi Awolowo from power in the Western Region.

Party member Augustus Akinloye later became chairman of the National Party of Nigeria in 1978.
