= Seth Kale =

Anglican bishop in Nigeria

The Right Reverend Seth Kale
- Bishop of Lagos
- Church: Church of Nigeria
- Diocese: Diocese of Lagos
- Appointed: December 1, 1963
- In office: 1963–1974
- Predecessor: Adelakun Howells
- Successor: Festus Segun
- Previous posts: Canon of the Cathedral Church of Christ, Lagos

Orders
- Ordination: 1963
- Consecration: 1963 by Cecil Patterson

Personal details
- Born: 1904 Mobalufon, Southern Nigeria Protectorate, British Nigeria
- Died: 1994 (aged 89–90) Mobalufon, Ogun State, Nigeria
- Parents: Jacob Kale (father); Victoria Kale (mother)
- Spouse: Juliana Kale
- Children: Ayodele, Olatokunbo, Oladele, Oyemola, Oyebanjo, Olasimbo
- Occupation: Educationist; theologist
- Education: Ijebu Ode Grammar School; Fourah Bay College; University of London

Seth Irunsewe Kale MBE, OON, CFR (June 6, 1904 – November 19, 1994) was a Nigerian Anglican bishop who served as Principal of CMS Grammar School, Lagos from 1944 to 1950 and as Bishop of Lagos from 1963 to 1974.

He was consecrated a bishop on St Andrew's Day (30 November) 1963, by Cecil Patterson, Archbishop of West Africa. He holds the distinction of being the first African to preach in the famous St Paul's Cathedral, London.

== Early life ==
Kale was born the eldest son of the family of seven on June 6, 1904, in Ipata, Mobalufon, in Odogbolu Local Government of Ogun State. His parents Pa Jacob and Mama Victoria Kale were said to be the first Christian converts in the village. At birth he was given the Yoruba name Irunsewe meaning “we” (this one) “se” (happen); “irun” (nothing at all). This was on account of the early demise of the first 3 children of Victoria and Jacob. Irunsewe means no harm shall befall this one. On June 25, 1904 he was baptized with the name Seth.

== Education ==
He started his formal education at the Christ Church Primary School, Porogun, Ijebu-Ode in 1912 and later attended Ijebu Ode Grammar School. In 1931 with assistance from the then principal of Ijebu Ode Grammar School, Rev. I.O Ransome-Kuti, Kale became the first recipient of the prestigious Mojola Agbebi scholarship and was admitted to Fourah Bay College, Sierra Leone where he earned a general degree of Bachelor of Arts. Thereafter, he went on to do one additional year leading to the Diploma in Theology in 1935. The following year he was employed as a teacher at CMS Grammar School, Lagos. In 1939 he earned a post-graduate diploma in Education from the University of London.

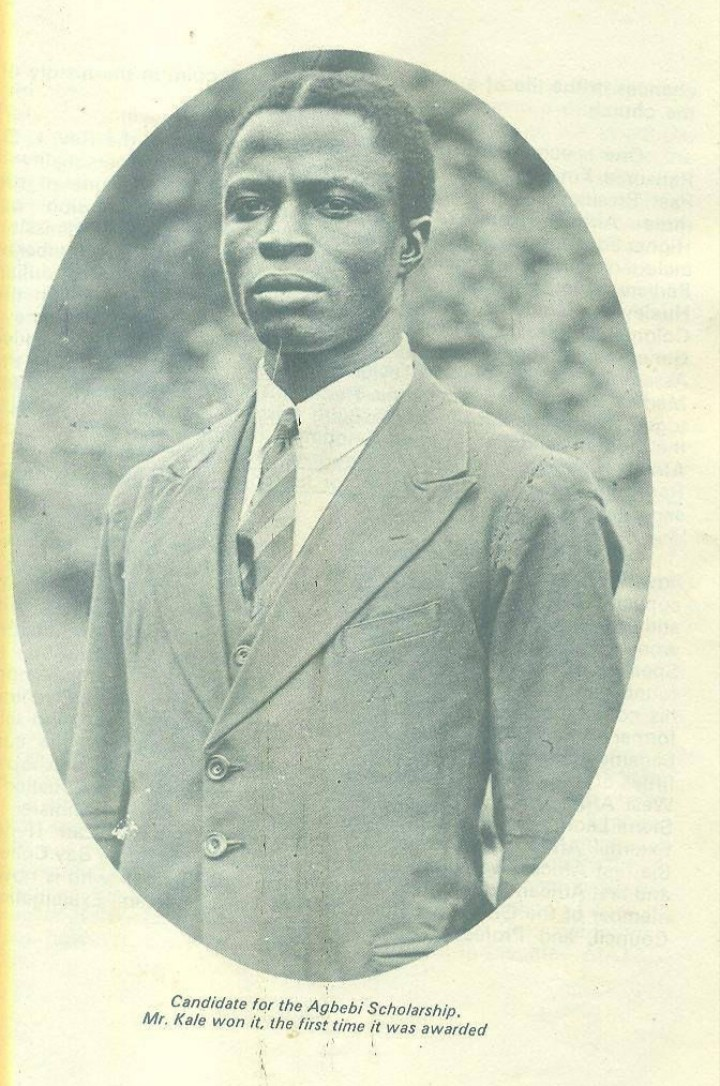
Seth Kale as the first recipient of the Agbebi Scholarship

== Career ==
Kale returned from London and was immediately appointed the acting principal of CMS Grammar School, Lagos, it took only three years before he became the first Nigerian to be appointed principal of the school in the twentieth century. In 1921, He was one of the founding members of the National Union of Teachers, including Vice-Principal, Jonathan Lucas and Rev. I.O Ransome-Kuti. He was still a principal at CMS Grammar School, Lagos when he became a deacon at the Cathedral Church of Christ, Lagos in 1942, he was ordained a priest on the anniversary of his diaconate in 1943. He became the first Nigerian principal of the long established St. Andrew’s Teachers’ Training College, Oyo, in 1951. He was credited for restoring law and order in the college after years of alleged prejudices, class distinctions, and social differences, which had plagued the college. In 1963, at the Assembly of Church Prelates in Toronto, Rev. Kale was elected the Bishop of Lagos and was consecrated on November 30, 1963.

== Personal life ==
Kale was twenty-five years old when he married Juliana Oladunni Odukoya, the grand-daughter of Oluwa Idele of Ijebu-Ode. The couple were joined in holy matrimony on January 6, 1930 at St. Savior’s Church, Italupe, Ijebu-Ode. In 1969, he officiated the wedding of then president of Nigeria, Yakubu Gowon at the Cathedral Church of Christ, Lagos.

== Bibliography ==
- T'Ibi T'Ire, Oxford University Press, 1947
- Folarin Coker (1974). The Rt. Reverend Seth Irunsewe Kale. CSS Press.

Church of England titles
| Preceded by Adelakun Howells | Bishop of Lagos; 1963–1974 | Succeeded by Festus Segun |
