= Adelakun =

Adelakun is both a surname and a given name of Yoruba origin, meaning we painted "crown/royalty". Notable people with the name include:

- Abimbola Adelakun, Nigerian writer
- Hakeeb Adelakun (born 1996), English footballer
- Joseph Adebayo Adelakun (born 1949), Nigerian gospel singer, songwriter and televangelist
- Adelakun Howells (1905–1963), Nigerian Anglican bishop
- Femi Adelakun, Nigerian city planner and location intelligence expert
- Engr kolade Adelakun (Retired) Assistant General Manager of Transmission company of Nigeria, Osogbo Sub-region
