= Olumuyiwa =

- Gender: Unisex
- Language: Yoruba

Origin
- Origin: Yoruba
- Region of origin: Southwest of Nigeria

Other names
- Short forms: Olu, Muyi, Muyiwa

Olumuyiwa is a Nigerian name of Yoruba origin meaning "God, Lord, or the prominent one brought this".

Notable people with this name include:

- Olumuyiwa Aganun (born 1984), Nigerian footballer
- Olumuyiwa Benard Aliu (born 1960), Nigerian engineer
- Olumuyiwa Jibowu (1899–1959), Nigerian jurist
- Olumuyiwa Fashanu (born 2002), American football player
- Oluwole Olumuyiwa (1929–2000), Nigerian architect

Olumuyiwa is also the title of the 2023 album by Nigerian folk musician, Beautiful Nubia.
