= Ijemo Massacre =

The Ijemo Massacre occurred on August 8, 1914, in Abeokuta, resulting in the killing of a number of Ijemo people. The incident arose from their opposition to the Treaty of 1893, which had promised autonomy to the Egba Kingdom. The crisis served as a pretext for the British colonial authorities to consolidate their control over Egba territory an area that later became part of Nigeria.

Around 3 p.m. on August 8, 1914, soldiers who had been deployed to Ijemo the previous night (without taking any action) suddenly opened fire on a gathering of villagers, including men, women, children, and their leader, Oluwo Arimokunrin. The attack followed a discussion among the villagers concerning the dismissal of the British government secretary in Ijemo.

During the 110th commemoration of the Ijemo Massacre, Chief Oluyinka Kufile, the Oluwo of Ijemo and Aro of Egbaland, reflected on the historical significance of the event. He noted that the massacre played an important role in the consolidation of Nigeria as a single entity. The commemoration, he added, serves as both a tribute to the heritage of the Ijemo people and a remembrance of their fallen heroes. Chief Kufile also highlighted that the massacre stemmed from the British government's distrust of the Ijemo people and represented a form of resistance by the community against colonial oppression.
