= EUG =

EUG may refer to:

- Egba United Government, a 19th-century political entity in British Nigeria
- Eugene–Springfield station, a train station in Eugene, Oregon, United States
- Eugene Airport, in Oregon, United States
- European Union of Geosciences, now part of the European Geosciences Union
- European Universities Games
