= Folarin =

- Gender: Male
- Language: Yoruba

Origin
- Meaning: Walk with wealth
- Region of origin: South west, Nigeria

Other names
- Short form: Fola
- Related names: Afolarin, Adefolarin, Ogunfolarin

Folarin audio is a Yoruba name of Yoruba origin meaning "walk with wealth". It could also serve as a diminutive forms of Yoruba names like Adefolarin, Ogunfolarin etc. Notable people with the name include:

== Given name ==
- Folarin Balogun (born 2001), professional soccer player
- Folarin Campbell (born 1986), Nigerian-American basketball player
- Folarin Ogunsola (born 1997), Gambian swimmer
- Folarin Adebusola-Quad (Born Dec 2nd), Lagos based entrepreneur

== Surname ==
- Adebesin Folarin (1877–1949), Nigerian judge
- Teslim Folarin (born 1963), Nigerian politician
- Tope Folarin (born 1981), Nigerian-American writer
