= Adetokunbo Lucas =

Nigerian doctor (1931–2020)

Adetokunbo Oluwole Lucas
- Born: 1931; Lagos, Nigeria
- Died: 25 December 2020 (aged 89); Ibadan, Nigeria
- Citizenship: Nigeria
- Education: Durham University
- Known for: Tropical Disease Research, Global Health
- Awards: Institute of Medicine, USA Fellow, Royal College of Obstetricians and Gynaecologists Prince Mahidol Award (1999)
- Scientific career
- Fields: Global Health
- Workplaces: University of Ibadan; Harvard School of Public Health

Adetokunbo Oluwole Lucas (1931 – 25 December 2020) was a Nigerian doctor who was considered a global leader in tropical diseases. Born in Lagos, he was educated in the United Kingdom and commenced his professional career in Nigeria. Lucas received the Prince Mahidol Award in 1999 for his support of strategic research on the tropical diseases. He served for ten years as the Director of Special Programmes for Research and Training in Tropical Diseases based at the World Health Organization in Geneva, Switzerland. He was adjunct professor of International Health Department of Global Health and Population of the Harvard School of Public Health. Lucas worked largely during his lifetime in his home nation of Nigeria and traveled frequently to the United Kingdom and to the Harvard School of Public Health in the United States.

== Early life and education ==
Lucas was born and raised in Lagos Island. His father was the Nigerian educator, Olumide Lucas. He attended St. Paul School and King's College Lagos for his primary and secondary education. He studied medicine at Durham University, graduating with honours in 1956, followed by postgraduate training in internal medicine and public health.

He was a professor of internal medicine and public health in University of Ibadan, Nigeria, from 1960 to 1976, and external examiner at the Department of Preventive Medicine, Makerere Medical School, Kampala, Uganda, after which he directed the Tropical Diseases Research Program of the World Health Organization for ten years, from 1976 to 1986. He later became involved in maternal and child health programs and worked to prevent maternal morbidity and mortality. He was named Professor of International Health at Harvard University in 1990, which position is held in the Harvard T.H. Chan School of Public Health, where he remained an adjunct professor in population health in the Department of Global Health and Population. He continued to serve on numerous expert and advisory committees for national and international organisations involved to international health issues. Such institutions include the Rockefeller Foundation, the Edna McConnell Clark Foundation, the Carter Center, and the Wellcome Trust Scientific Group on Tropical Medicine. He also chaired the Global Forum for Health Research.

== Publications ==
Lucas was the author of numerous books and articles in refereed public health journals

- A Short Textbook of Preventive Medicine for the Tropics (University Medicine Texts) (1984)
- Short Textbook of Public Health Medicine for the Tropics, 4Ed (2002)
- It Was the Best of Times: From Local to Global Health (2010, Autobiography published in Africa)
- The Man: Adetokunbo Lucas (2011 Biography)

== Honors ==
Lucas was a fellow of the Royal College of Obstetricians and Gynaecologists and was one of the first foreign associates of the Institute of Medicine. He has received honorary degrees from Emory University, Tulane University, and University of Ibadan; and Harvard University has bestowed academic honours upon him. He was a fellow of the Royal College of Obstetricians and Gynaecologists and one of the first foreign associates of the IOM (Institute of Medicine).

He was a recipient of the Prince Mahidol Award (1999), based in Thailand (jointly with Harvard Medical School graduate Dr. R. Palmer Beasley of the United States and Dr. Tore Godal of Norway), the Centenary Medal for Life-Time Achievements in Tropical Medicine (2007) and of the Jimmy and Rosalynn Carter Humanitarian Award from the National Foundation for Infectious Diseases (NFID) (5 March 2013).

== Personal life ==
Lucas was married and had four children. He died on 25 December 2020, aged 89, at his home in Ibadan, Nigeria.
