= Isaac Delano =

Nigerian writer and political activist

Chief Isaac O. Delano
- Born: November 4, 1904; Okenla, Ifo, Ogun State, Nigeria
- Died: December 17, 1979 (aged 75); Okenla, Ogun State, Nigeria
- Education: King's College, Lagos
- Occupations: Author, writer, political activist, teacher, linguist
- Children: Chief Edmundson O. Delano, Chief Isaac B. Delano, Chief Akinwande Delano
- Writing career
- Language: Yoruba, English
- Period: 1938–1979
- Genres: History, politics, grammar/linguistics
- Subjects: Yoruba culture, Yoruba history, Yoruba language
- Notable works: Atumo Èdè Yorùbá; Owè l'ẹṣin ọrọ: Yoruba proverbs, their meaning and Usage; Modern Yoruba Grammar

Isaac Oluwole Delano (November 4, 1904 – December 17, 1979) was a Yoruba and Nigerian writer, educationist, political activist, nationalist, radio broadcaster, teacher, and a pioneering linguist and lexicographer of the Yoruba language.

Born in the small village of Ṣuren-Okenla (or Shuren) in what is now in Ifo Local Government in Ogun State, Nigeria, he was one of the first Nigerians to have a full western education from his youth. After graduating from high school, he became a civil servant for the government of British Nigeria until an accident in 1947, and soon began a pioneer movement to document the history, culture, and language of the Yoruba people, which was beginning to be eroded by British and Arab influences that had existed for decades.

His books involved documenting Yoruba historical heroes, common Yoruba proverbs, government styles of the Yoruba, and others. As a political/social activist, he attempted to explain African societies and the position of women, destroying stereotypes of female submissiveness in Yoruba culture and instead advocated that women were respected equals in Yoruba society and government. He also brought attention to female Yoruba heroes like Moremi Ajasoro. During the 1950s, during a time when movements for African independence grew, Delano served as a powerful nationalist and a voice of the people through his writing.

== Biography ==
Delano was born on November 4, 1904, in a rural agricultural based community of Okenla in what is now Ifo Local Government, Ogun State to Chief Edmund Delano, and Rebecca Delano, members of the Egba subethnic group of the Yoruba people. Okenla, also known as Ṣuren-Okenla, was founded in 1868 by Chief John Owolatan Okenla, an Egba leader from Egba Ake area of Egbaland.

After the creation of the town of Abeokuta, missionaries soon came and in 1842 he became one of the earliest converts. After a war between newly converted Egba and Egba still adhering to their traditional religion, he went and founded the Holy Trinity Anglican Cathedral in 1868, and the village grew as more Christian converts flocked there. Both of Delano's parents were early converts to Christianity from the town of Abeokuta and most likely were among the groups of people that flocked to these new "Christian satellite villages" like Okenla and Wasinmi. The Delanos both became powerful Christian leaders in their community. His father was the leader, or Aro of the Egba Christians.

Delano was one of the first Nigerians to go through the newly established western education brought by the British. He began attending the Holy Trinity School in his village in 1911 and from 1919 to 1921, he attended the infamous CMS Grammar School. He then transferred to the secondary school King's College, Lagos, graduating in 1923. Unable to afford school tuitions for a Cambridge University education, he became a clerk for the British colonial administration in Lagos, serving there until an accident in 1947. During this time he acquired his writing skills.

After leaving the civil service in 1947, he began doing research and writings, before winning a scholarship to teach at the University of London and served as a teaching assistant until 1961, and taught the Yoruba language and linguistics. During this time, he wrote a Yoruba dictionary with grammar rules, the first of its type, Atumọ Èdè Yorùbá which was rejected several times until it was published in 1958. This dictionary was groundbreaking because earlier books had attempted to explain Yoruba using conventional English grammar tools, which did not work. Instead, Delano used tones and diacritics to write the language, and this model is used till this day.

In 1961, he returned to Nigeria and became a radio broadcaster and newspaper correspondent, and a Christian leader, often working to mend the ties between the Yoruba Christian community and local Yoruba worshippers of the traditional religion. He also was a prominent Nigerian nationalist and wrote several books advocating for pan-Africanism, such as "Soul of Nigeria," one of his first books. In an attempt to conserve Yoruba culture's continuous influence from first Arab influencers (from the Fulani invaders), and then the British, he also wrote many Yoruba history books. He was quick to judge those who often dismissed women as prominent members of ancient Yoruba government, citing the story of Moremi Ajasoro.

== Personal life ==
He was married and had several children, grandchildren, and great-grandchildren. His first son, a mechanical engineer, Chief Edmundson Olakunle Delano, was born on February 16, 1926, and died on May 5, 2019. Another son, Isaac Babatunde Delano, who was a Chief Justice of Ogun State was born on June 1, 1935, and died on July 23, 2020. One of his youngest sons is Chief Akinwande Delano (born 1938), a lawyer and former Attorney General of Ogun State.

== Honors ==
For his advancement of the Yorùbá people and his position as a teacher of the Yoruba language, and culture, he was appointed as the first Administrative Secretary of the Egbe Omo Oduduwa. He was granted many chieftaincy titles, including that of the Bajiki Ake of Egbaland (given to him by Ọba Ladapo Ademola) and the Babasale of Okenla, his hometown. He also received an honorary Doctor of Letters degree from the University of Ife in 1976.

== Death ==
He died on December 17, 1979, at the age of 75.

== Bibliography ==
Delano's works include:

- 1934 -Soul of Nigeria
- 1942 -The Singing Minister of Nigeria
- 1944 -Notes and Comments from Nigeria
- 1945 -An African looks at Marriage
- 1945 -One Church for Nigeria
- 1955 -Aiye d'Aiye Oyinbo
- 1958 -Àtùmọ Èdè Yorùbá
- 1960 -Àgbékà Oro Yorùbá: Appropriate Words and Expressions in Yoruba
- 1963 -Lojo Ojo Un
- 1964 -Ìrantí Anfáni
- 1965 -Modern Yoruba Grammar
- 1966 -Òwe L'ẹṣin ọrọ: Yoruba proverbs, their meaning and Usage
- 1968 -Conversations in Yoruba and English
- 1968 -Josiah Ransome-Kuti: the Drummer Boy who Became a Canon
- 1969 -Oba Ademola II: A Great Alake of Egba
