= Cathedral Church of Christ, Lagos =

Christ Church Cathedral, Lagos
- Cathedral Church of Christ, Marina Lagos
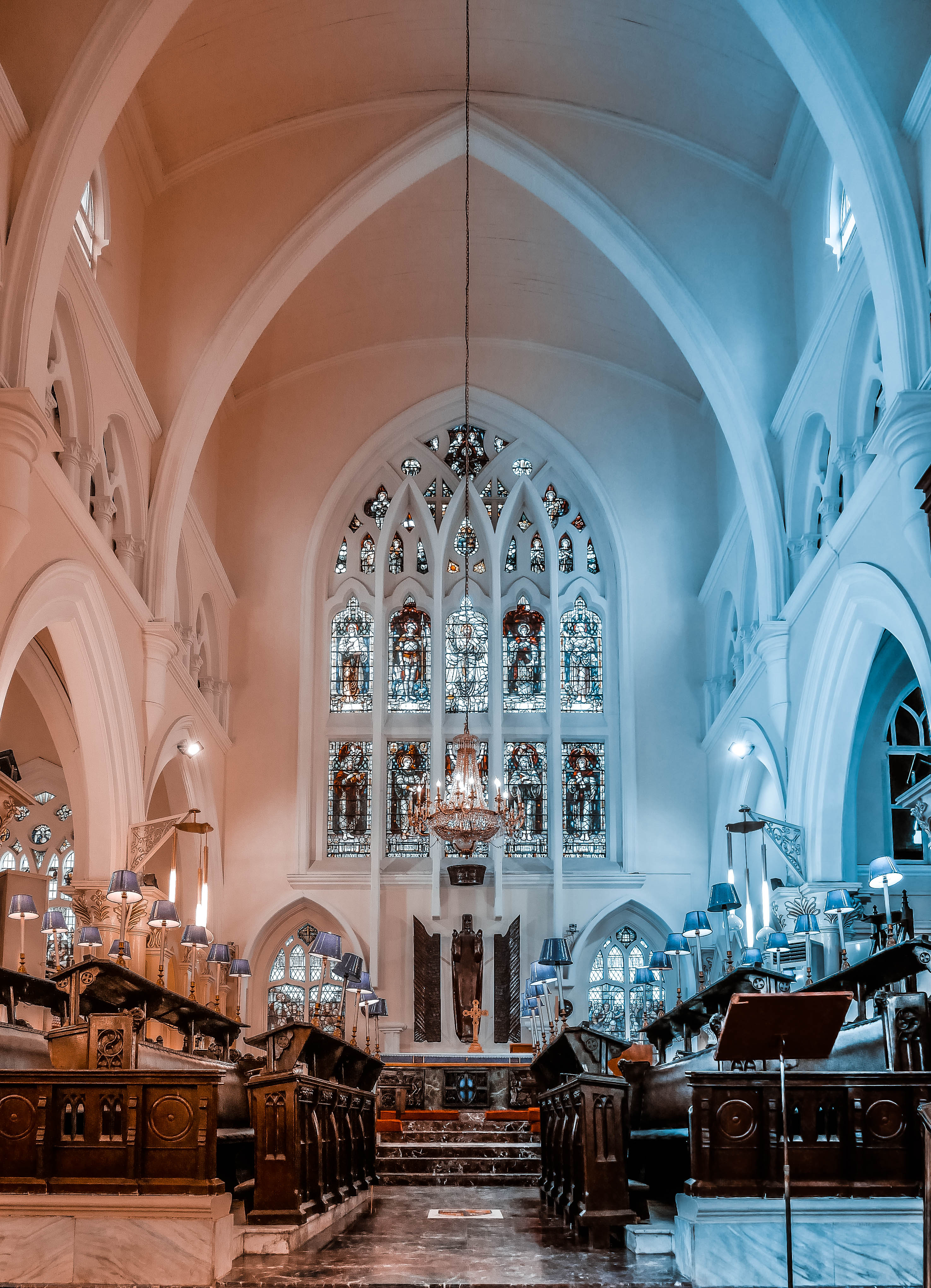
- Interior of the cathedral
- Christ Church Cathedral, Lagos
- 6.4508°N 3.3902°E
- Location: Lagos
- Country: Nigeria
- Denomination: Anglican
- Website: www.thecathedrallagos.org

Architecture
- Architect: Bagan Benjamin
- Architectural type: Norman Gothic
- Groundbreaking: 1924
- Completed: 1946

Administration
- Province: Province of Lagos
- Diocese: Diocese of Lagos

The Cathedral Church of Christ Marina, Lagos is an Anglican cathedral on Lagos Island, Lagos, Nigeria.

== History ==
The foundation stone for the first cathedral building was laid on 29 March 1867 and the cathedral was established in 1869. The cathedral celebrated its 150th anniversary in 2017.

Construction of the current building to designs by architect Bagan Benjamin started on 1 November 1924. The foundation stone was laid by the Prince of Wales (later King Edward VIII) on 21 April 1925. It was completed in 1946.

In 1976 the relics of Rev Dr Samuel Ajayi Crowther, a former enslaved Yoruba man who became the first African bishop in the Anglican Church, were translated to the cathedral. There is a cenotaph erected as a memorial of him.

It is popularly known as the Cathedral Church of Christ Marina, and is the oldest Anglican cathedral in the Church of Nigeria. At various times in its history, the cathedral was the seat of the archbishop of the Province of West Africa, the seat of the archbishop and primate of All Nigeria and the seat of the archbishop of the Ecclesiastical Province of Lagos. It is currently the seat of the Bishop of Lagos.

The organ was built by Oberlinger Orgelbau, Germany on right side of the altar with two façades – one looking to the altar and second looking to the right nave. One of the sections, Antiphonal, is located at the organ loft above the main entrance to the church. At the beginning of the 21st century the whole instrument was renewed (and console rebuilt) by English company Harrison & Harrison; it consists of 64 stops on 4 manuals and a pedalboard. It is the largest organ in Nigeria.

== Notable events ==
In 1969, then president of Nigeria, Yakubu Gowon married Victoria Zakari, at a ceremony officiated by Seth Irunsewe Kale at the cathedral.

The cathedral hosted the funeral of Engineer Victor Adetunji Haffner(1919–2015), the telecommunications engineer in Nigeria, on Friday, November 27, 2015.

Celebrating the Centennial of the Cathedral Church of Christ Choir, Lagos, Nigeria: 1918–2018 on November 23, 1918.

The funeral of Chief Mrs. Florence Morenike Saraki, mother of former Nigerian Senate President Dr. Abubakar Bukola Saraki, was held at the cathedral on Friday, July 19, 2024.

== Gallery ==
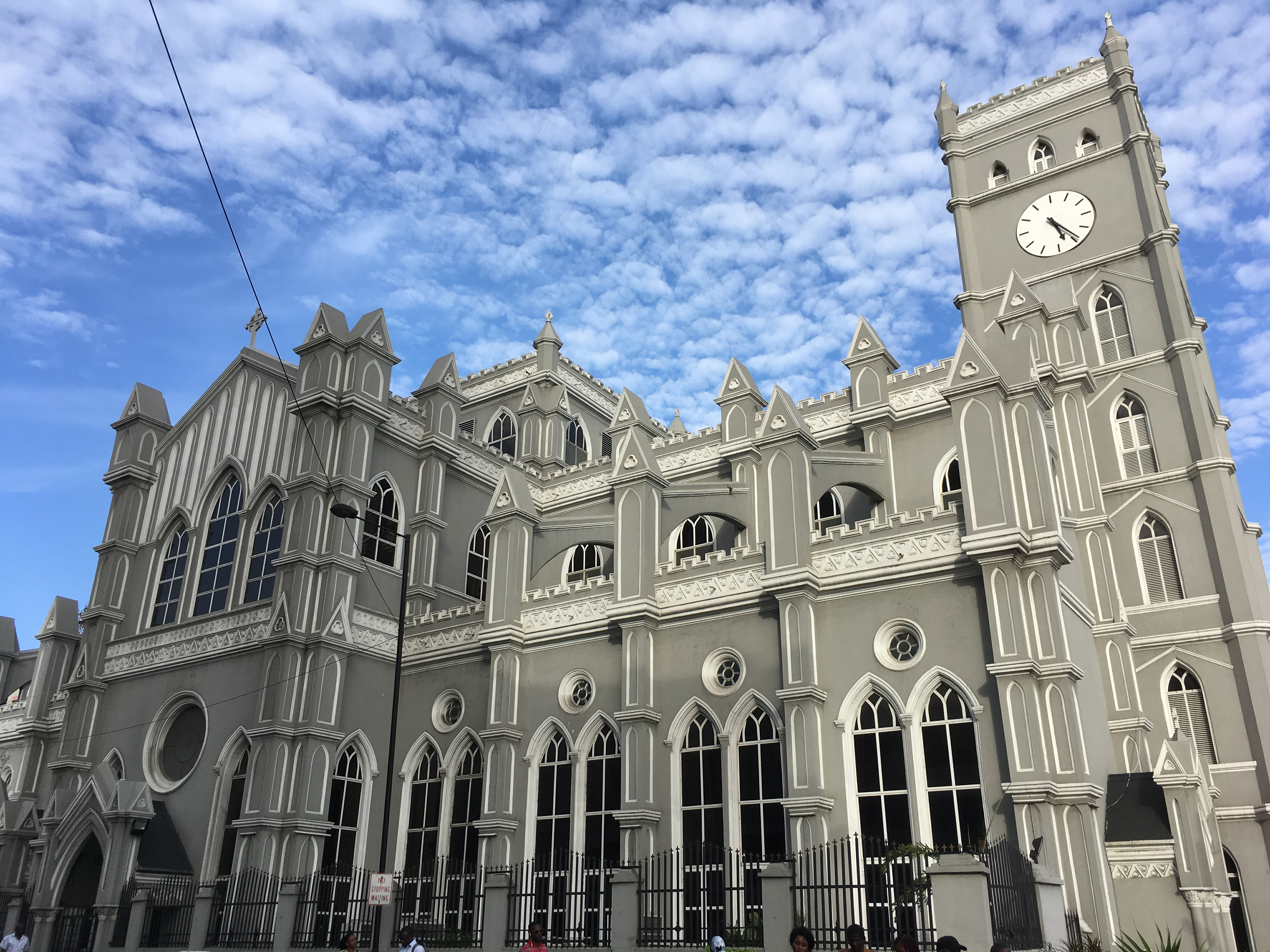

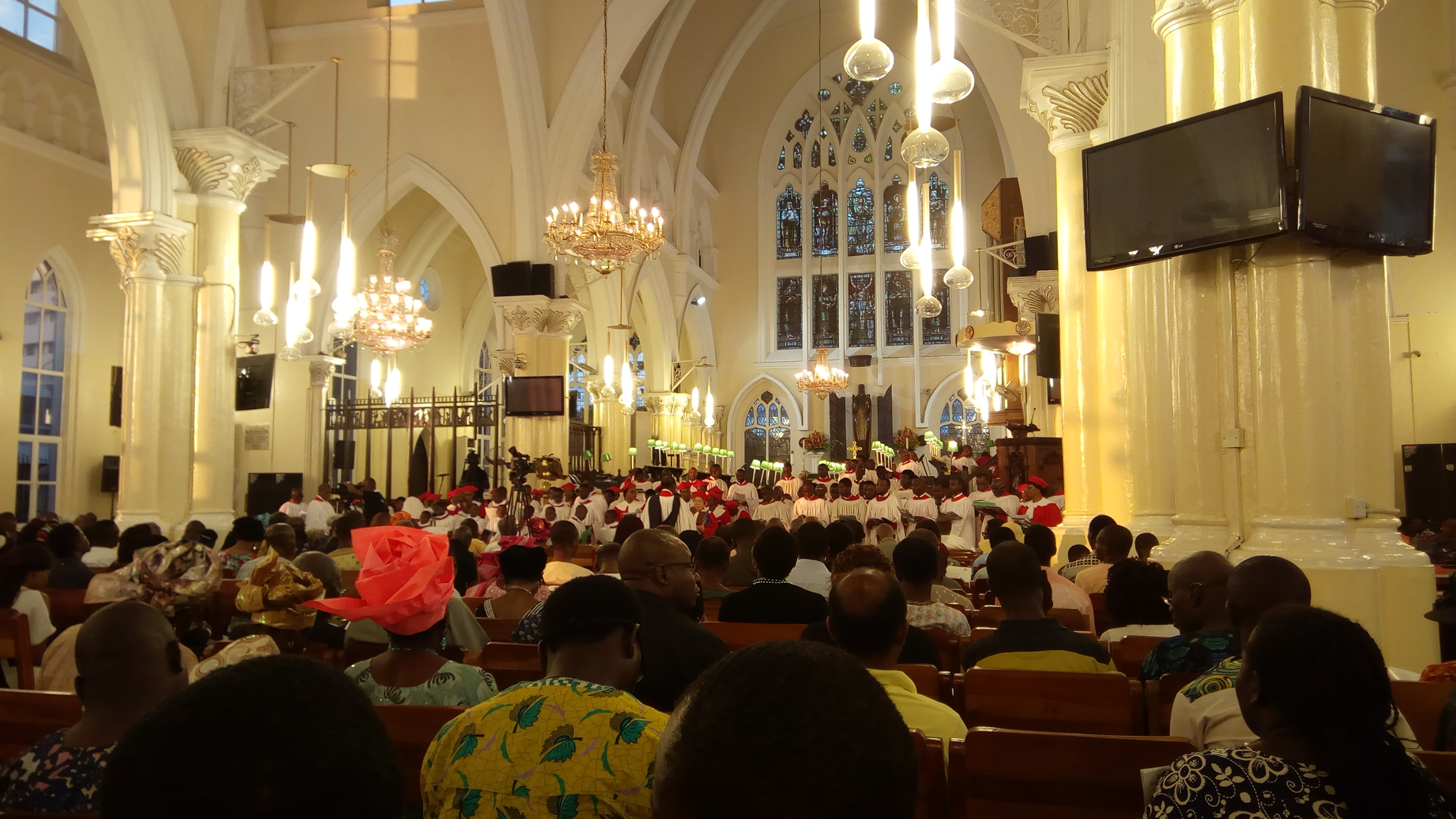
Interior of Church of Christ

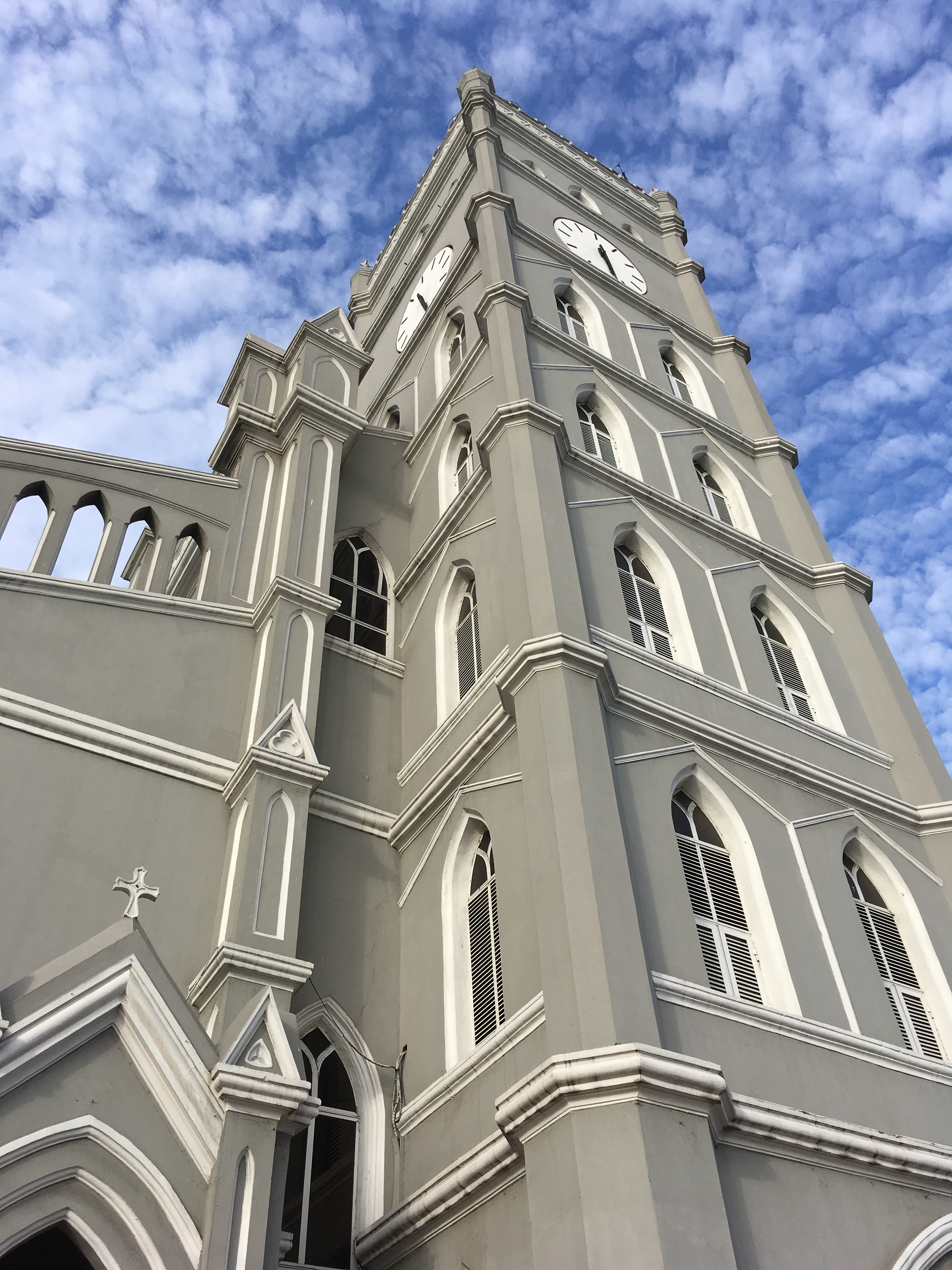

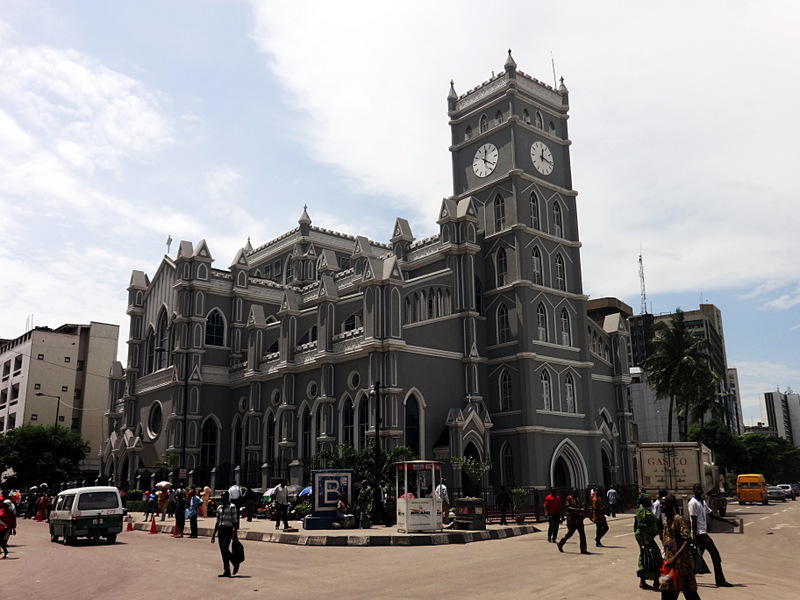
The building and streetside of the cathedral

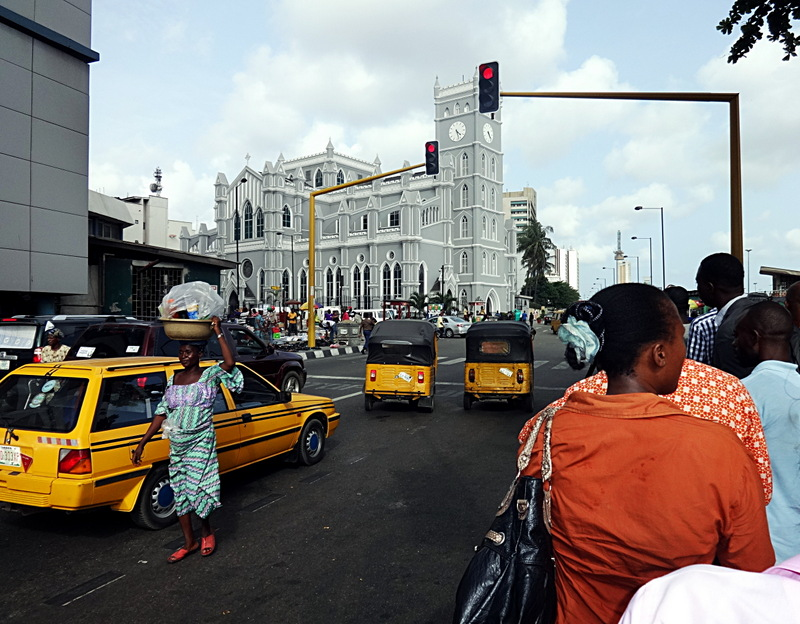

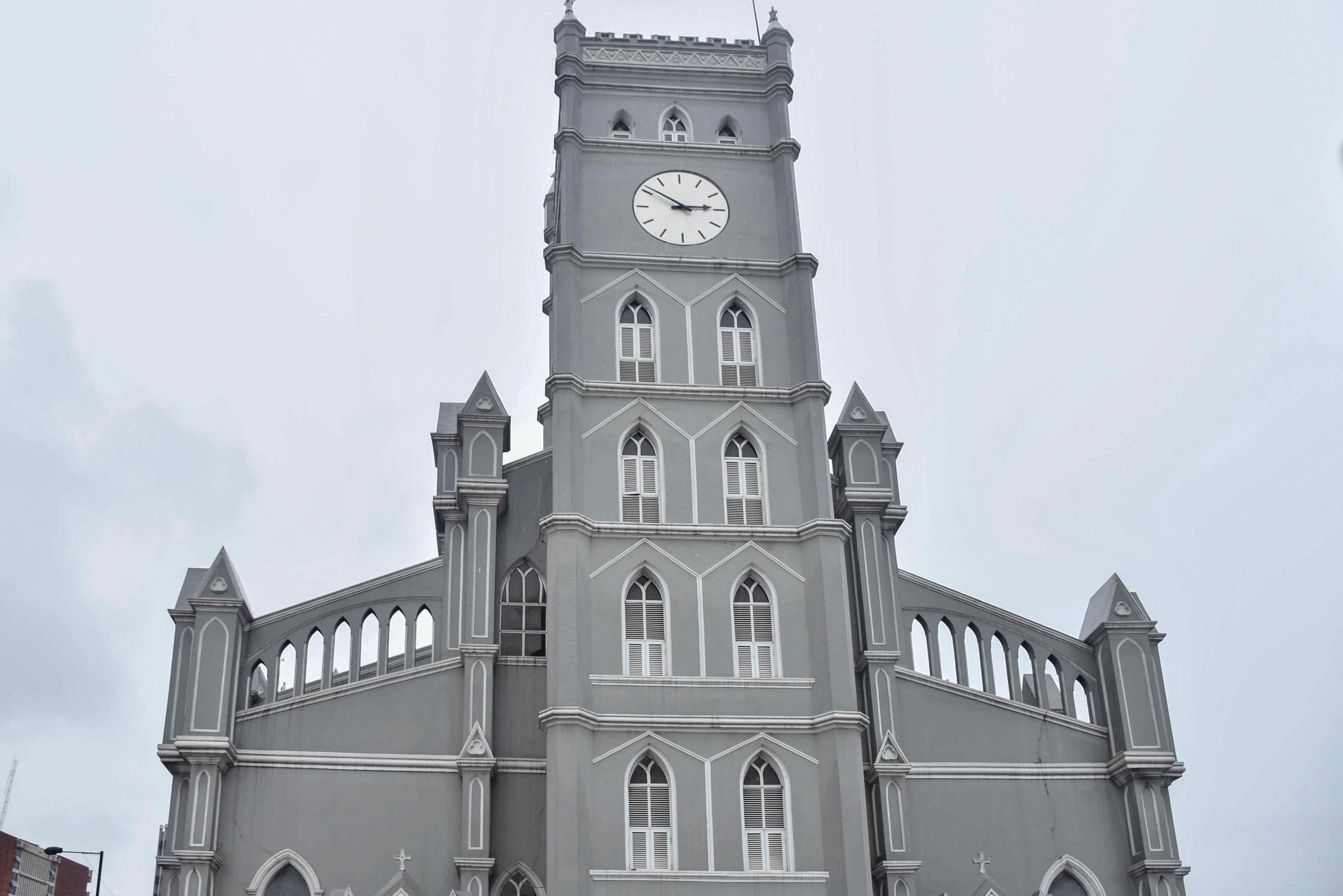
A front View The Cathedral at CMS, Lagos

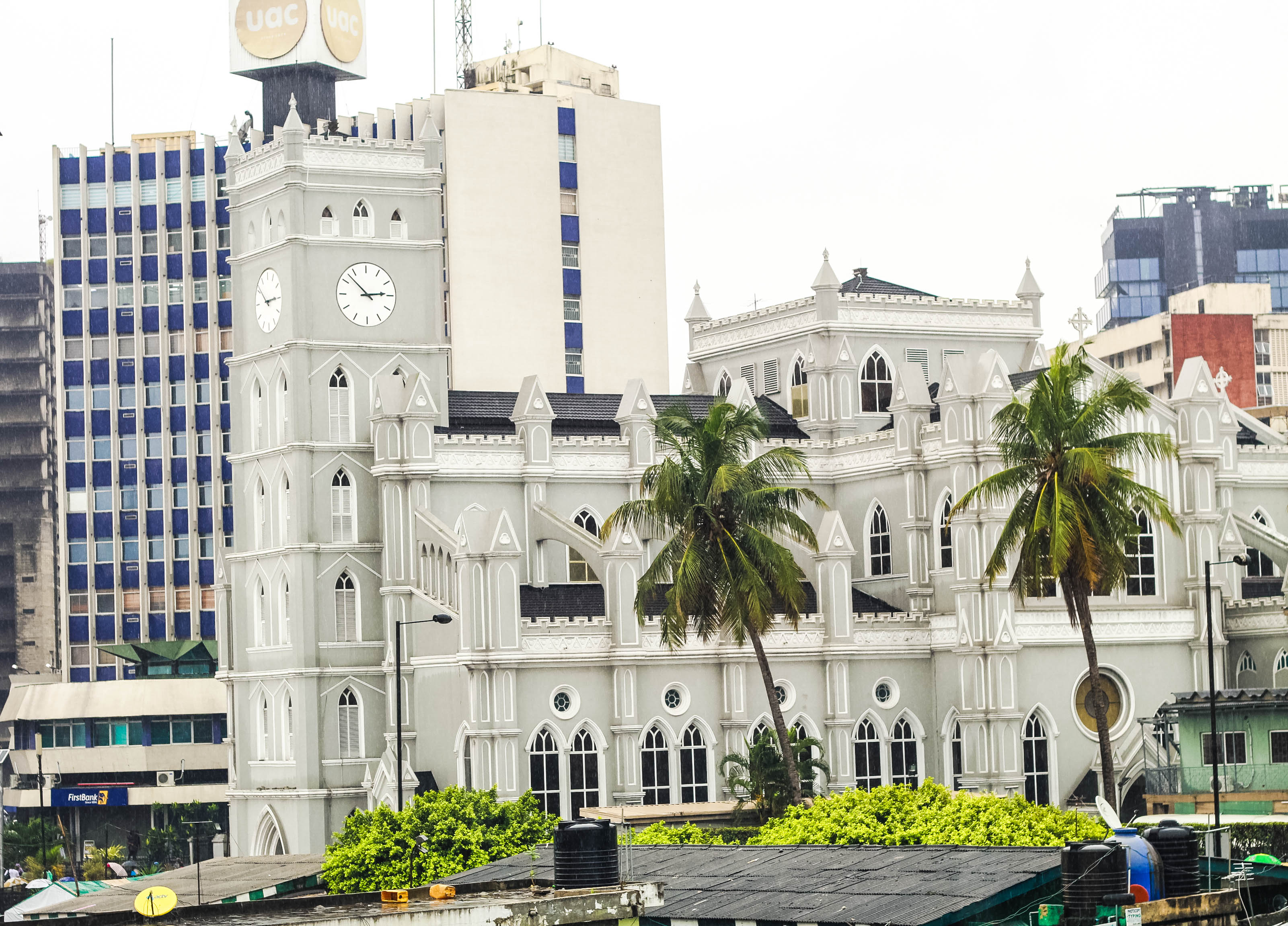
Side view of The Cathedral at CMS, Lagos

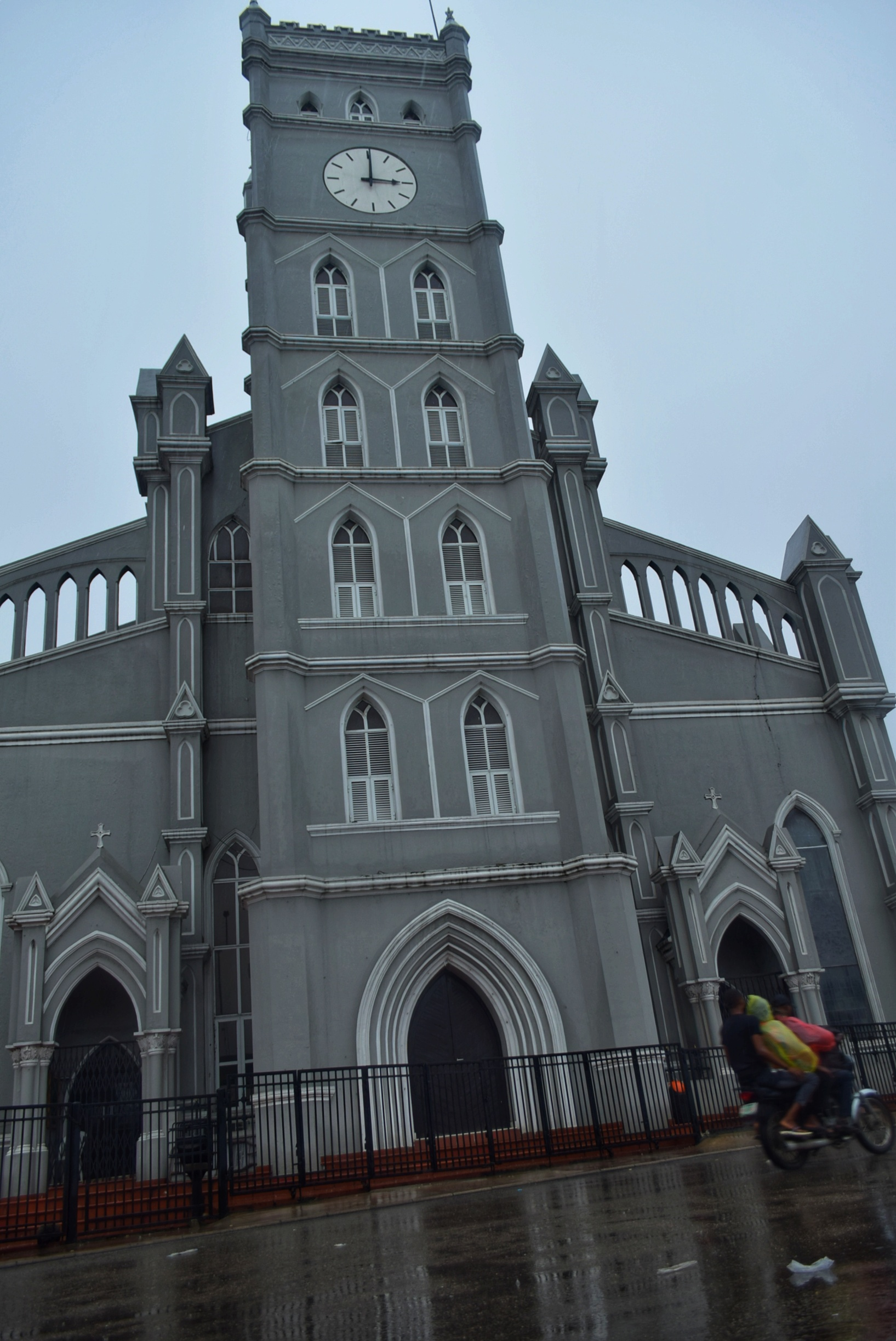

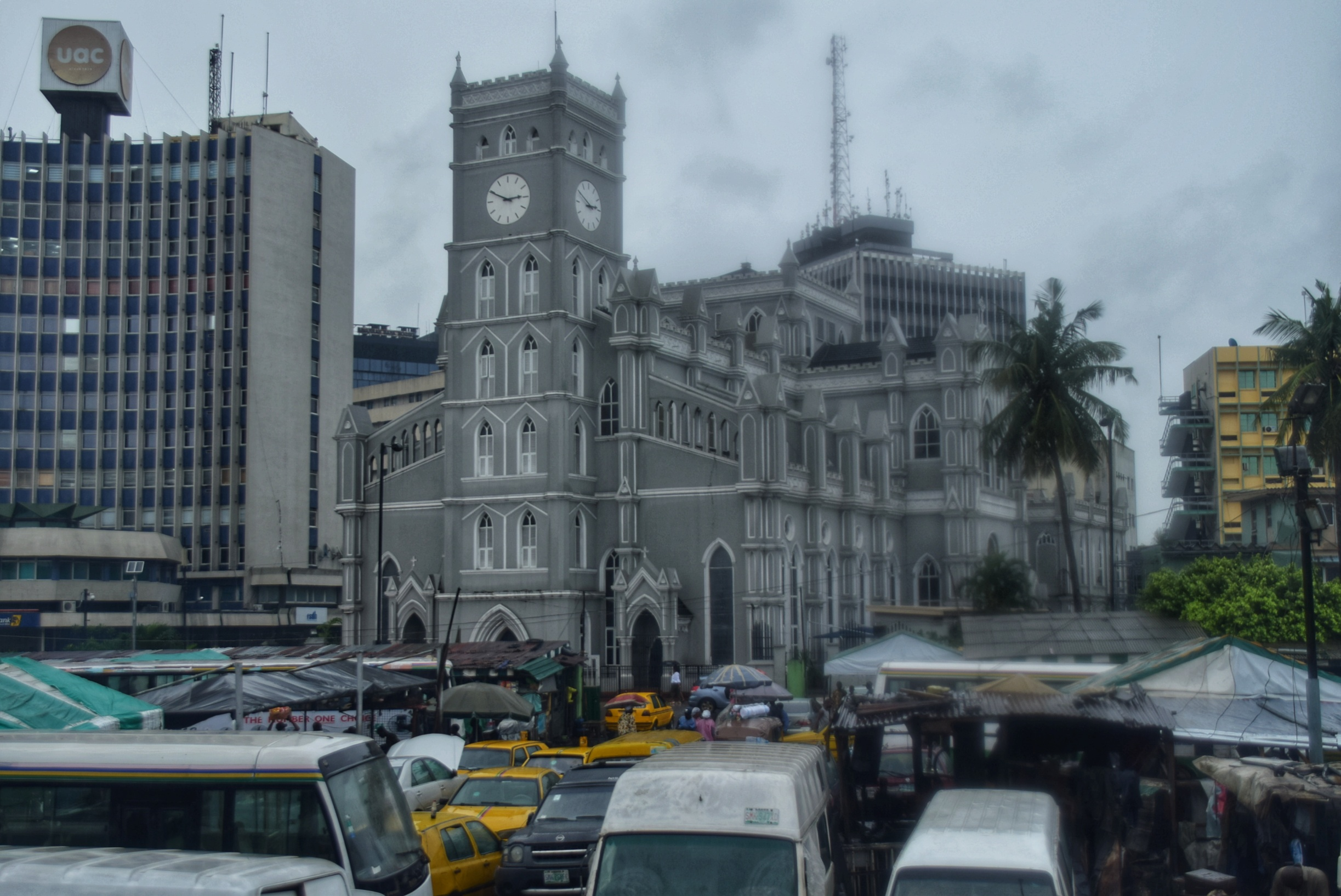

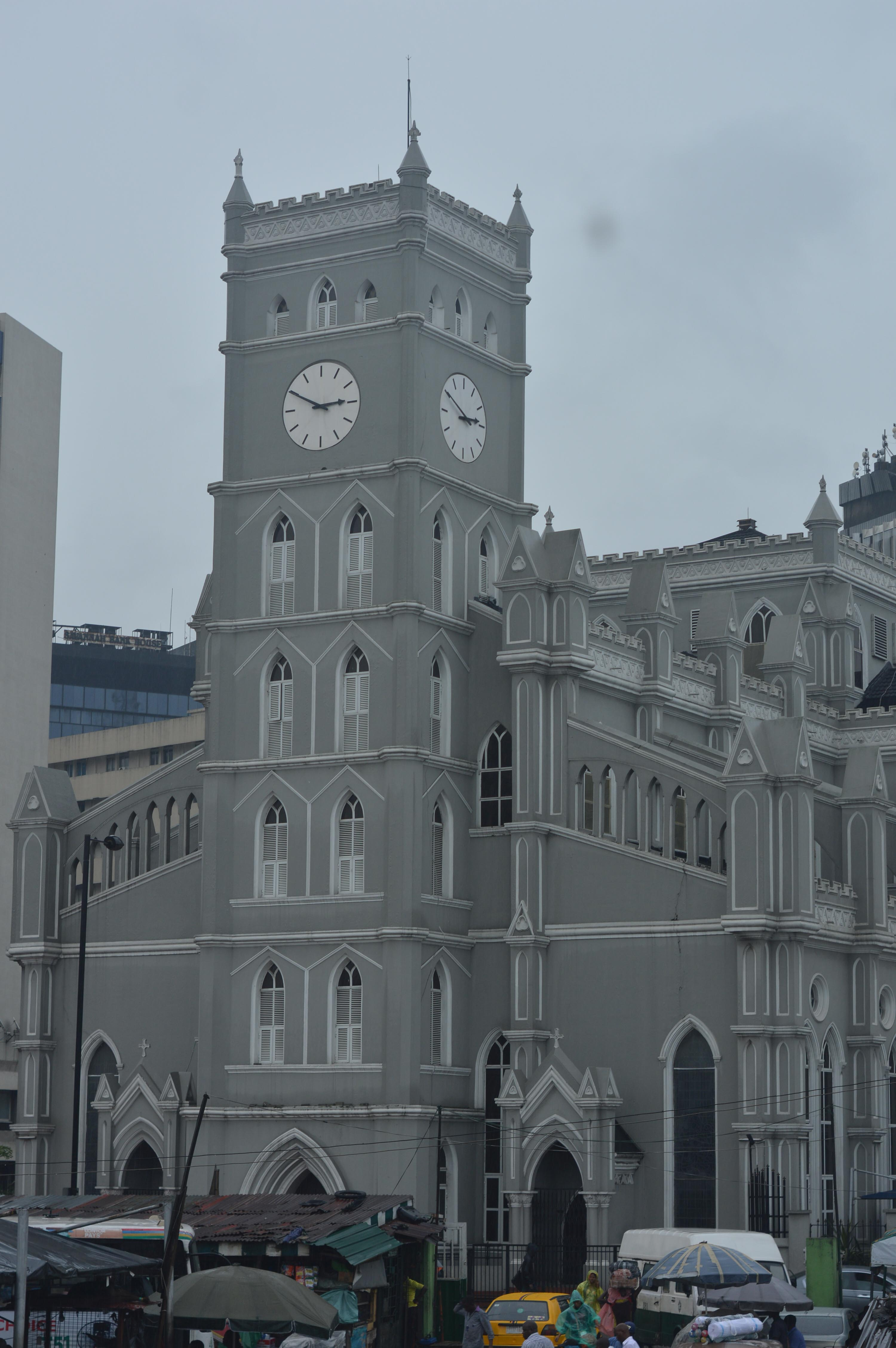

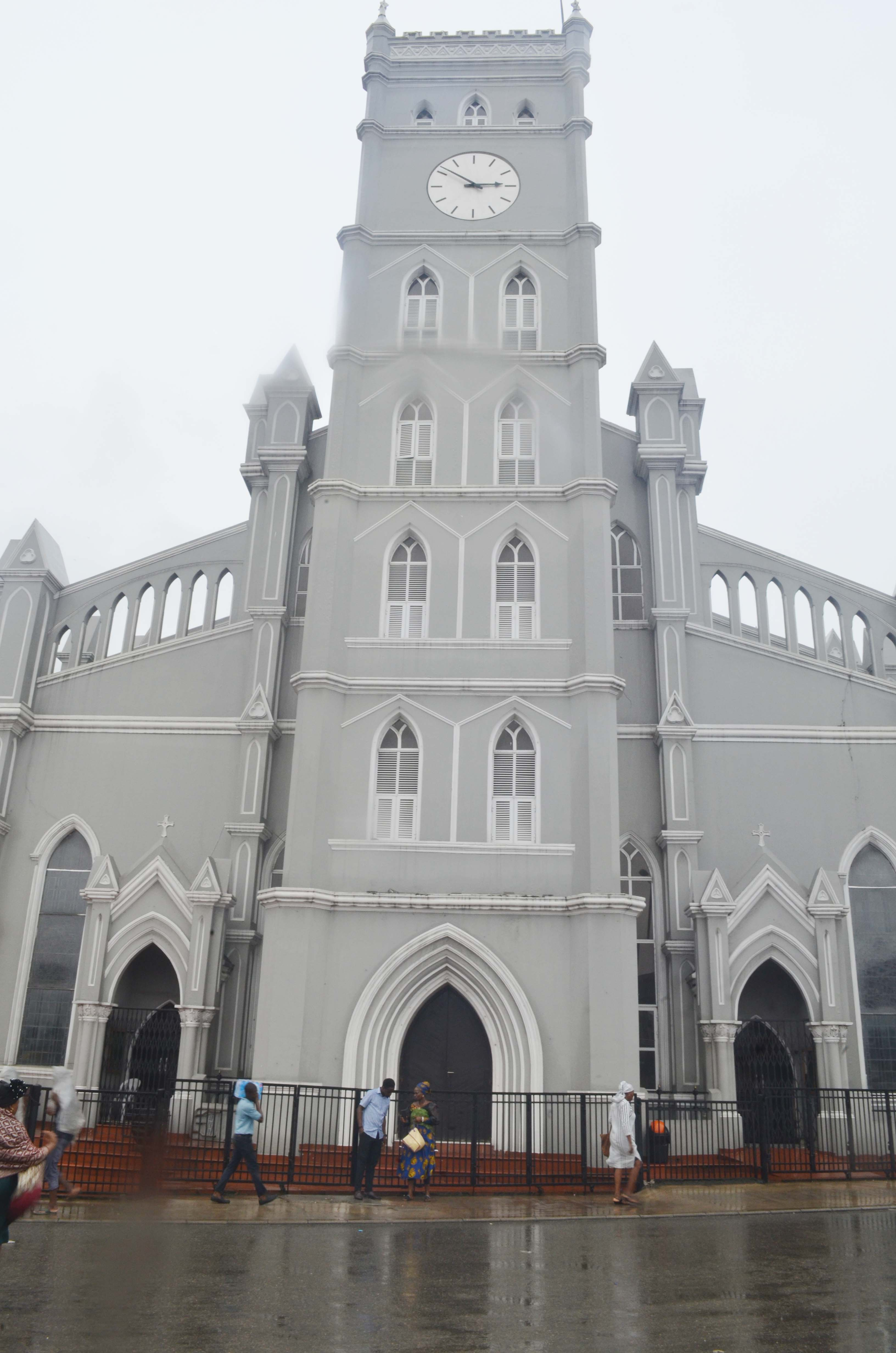

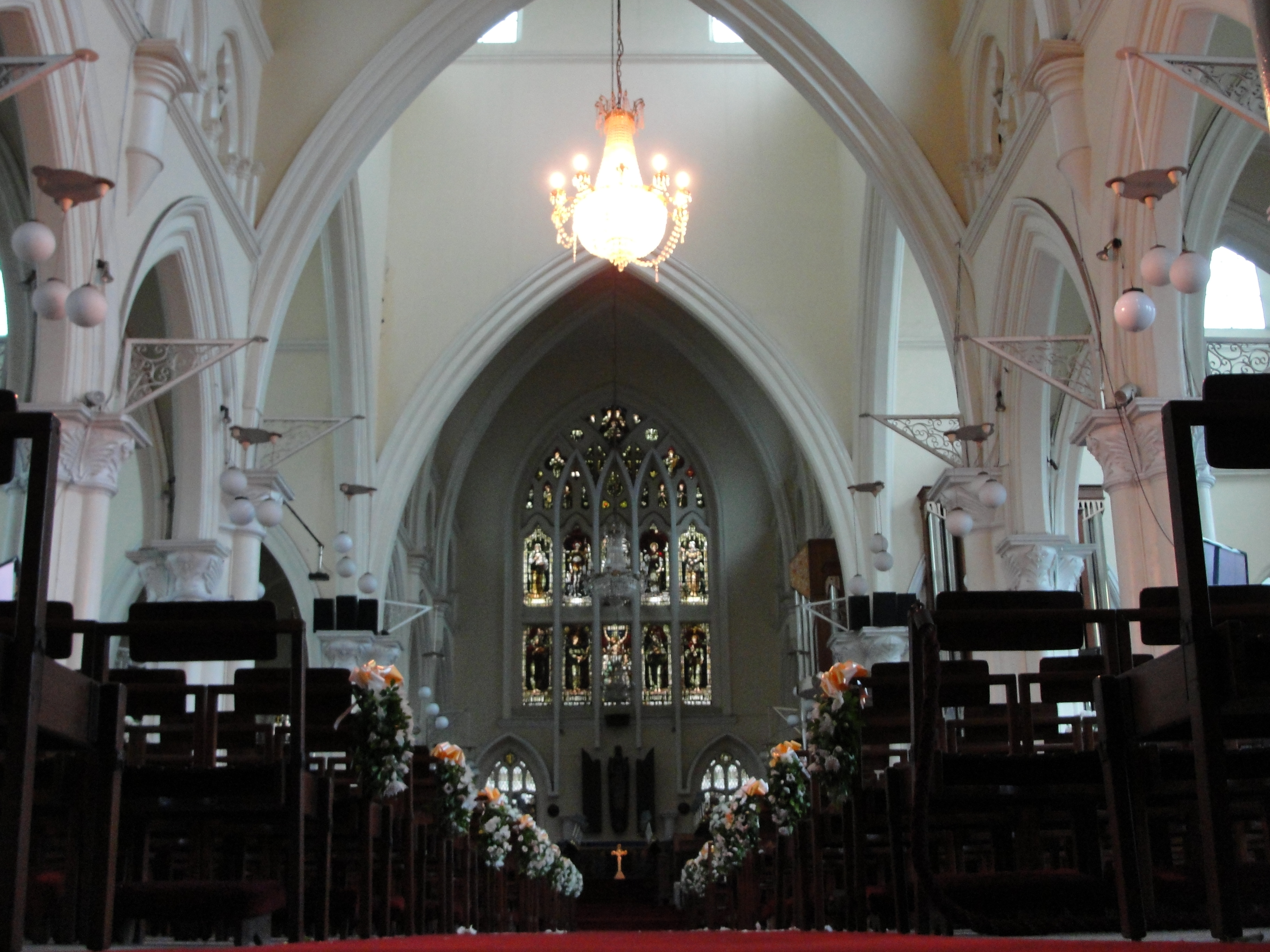

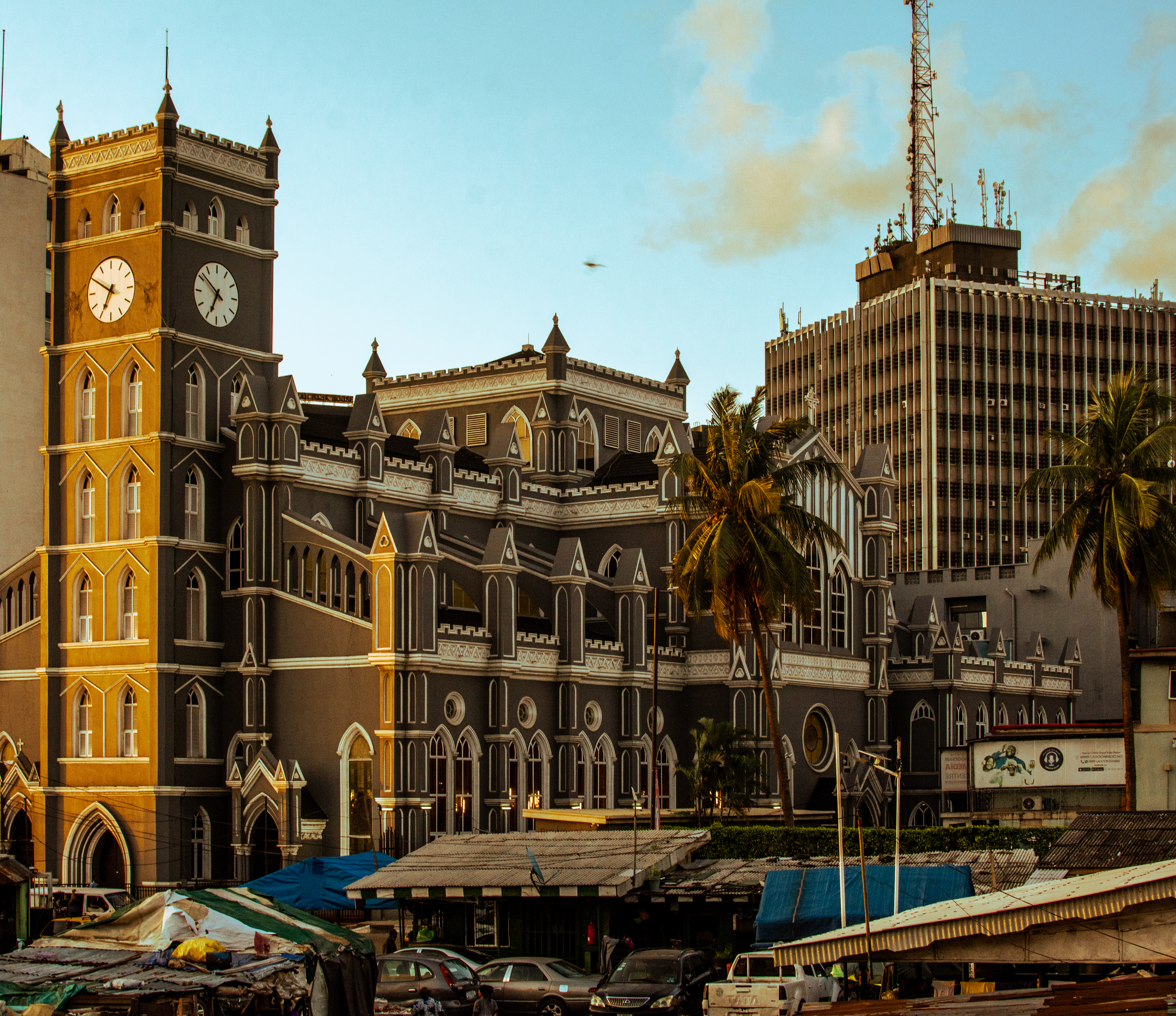
