= CMS Grammar School, Lagos =

Secondary school in Bariga, Lagos State, Nigeria

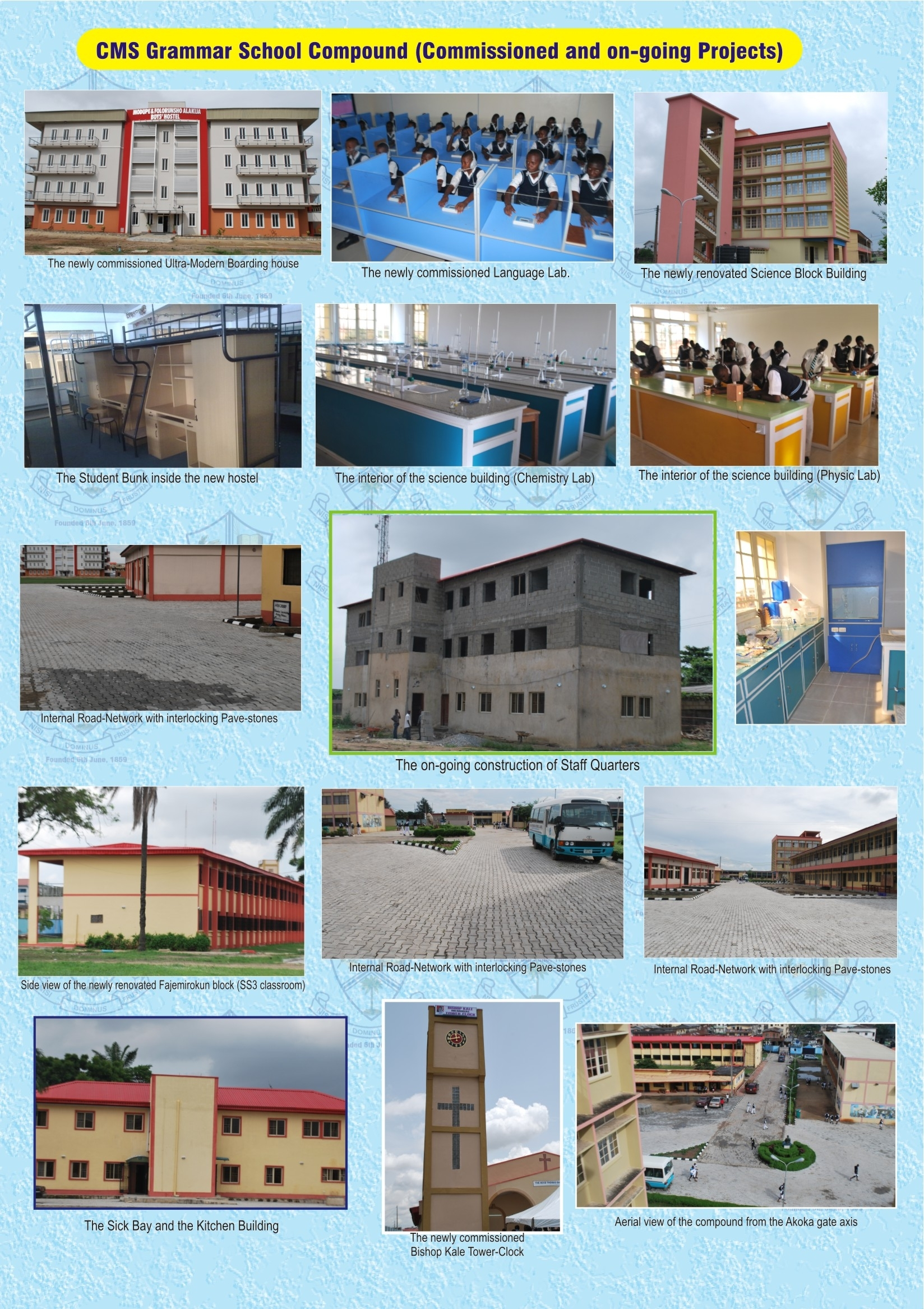

Location
- Asani Road, Bariga; Bariga-Lagos, Lagos State; Nigeria; 6.534583°N 3.388638°E

Information
- School type: Secondary
- Motto: Nisi Dominus Frustra (Without God we labor in vain)
- Established: 6 June 1859
- Principal: The Revd' Jacob Ayokunle Ogunyinka

The CMS Grammar School in Bariga, a suburb of Lagos in Lagos State, is the oldest secondary school in Nigeria, founded on 6 June 1859 by the Church Missionary Society. For decades it was the main source of African clergymen and administrators in the Lagos Colony.

== Foundation ==
The seed funding for CMS Grammar School, Lagos was made possible by James Pinson Labulo Davies who in April 1859 provided Babington Macaulay with £50 (equivalent of ₦1.34 million as of 2014) to buy books and equipment for the school. With the seed funding, Macaulay opened CMS Grammar School on 6 June 1859. Hence, making it the first secondary school in Nigeria. In 1867, Davies contributed another £100 (₦2.68 million as of 2014) toward a CMS Grammar School Building Fund. Other contributors to the CMS Building Fund were non-Saros such as; Daniel Conrad Taiwo (AKA) Taiwo Olowo who contributed £50. Saro contributors also included men such as Moses Johnson, I.H. Willoughby, T.F. Cole, James George, and Charles Foresythe who contributed £40. The CMS Grammar School in Freetown, founded in 1848, served as a model.

The school began with six students, all boarders in a small, single story building called the 'Cotton House' at Broad Street. The first pupils were destined to be clergymen. The curriculum included English, Logic, Greek, Arithmetic, Geometry, Geography, History, Bible Knowledge and Latin. The first principal of the school was the scholar and theologian Babington Macaulay, who served until his death in 1878. He was the father of Herbert Macaulay. When the British colony of Lagos was established in 1861, the colonial authorities obtained most of their African clerical and administrative staff from the school.

== Principals ==
- Babington Macaulay, 1859–1878.
- Henry Johnson, 1879–1881 (acting).
- Isaac Oluwole, 1881–1893.
- James Johnson, 1893–1894 (acting).
- E. A. Godson, 1894–1895.
- Melville Jones 1895–1896 (acting)
- Joseph Suberu Fanimokun, 1896–1914.
- E. J. Evans, 1915–1927.
- A. Hobson, 1927–1929.
- F. Watherton 1929–1932.
- J. Olumide Lucas, 1932–1935 (acting).
- C. G. Thorne, 1935–1936.
- Solomon Odunaiya Odutola, 1936–1938. (acting)
- Leonard John Lewis, 1938–1943.
- Seth Irunsewe Kale, 1944–1950.
- B. A. Adelaja, 1950–1970.
- T. A. Ojo, 1970–1972, (acting).
- I. A. Olowu 1972–1984.
- B. A. Nigwo, 1984–1986.
- J. B. A. Edema, 1986–1997.
- Taiwo O. Jemilugba, 1997–2001.
- Johnson Onayinka, 2001–2005.
- Tunde Oduwole, 2005–2017
- OlaOluwa Adeyemi, 2017–2018
- Sunday O. Sofekun, 2018 - 2021
- Jacob Ogunyinka, 2022- Till date

== Alumni ==
Some notable alumni:

- 9ice (born 1980), musician
- Olusola Allen-Taylor nee Faulkner-Shaw (1908-1996), Matron St. Anne's School Ibadan
- Adebesin Folarin (1877-1949), lawyer and historian
- Adeyemo Alakija (1884–1952), media entrepreneur and co-founder of Daily Times of Nigeria
- Adeniji Adele (1893–1964), Oba (King) of Lagos from 1 October 1949, to 12 July 1964
- Akin Babalola Kamar Odunsi, businessman and Senator
- Akin Euba (born 1935), professor of music
- Akintola Williams (born 1919), accountant
- Alexander Akinyele (1875–1968), Bishop
- Ayodele Awojobi (1937–84), academic and activist
- Babs Fafunwa (1923–2010), Federal Minister of Education
- Bode Thomas (1918–53), politician
- Candido Da Rocha (1860–1959), businessman
- Charles A. Adeogun-Phillips (born 1966), lawyer
- Dandeson Crowther, Archbishop of the Niger and son of Samuel Ajayi Crowther
- Dare Art Alade, musician
- Ernest Shonekan (1936–2022), Interim president of Nigeria
- Fela Sowande (1905–87), musician and composer
- Frederick Rotimi Williams (1920–2005), lawyer
- George Da Costa (1853–1929), photographer
- GOK Ajayi (21 May 1931 – 31 March 2014), Prominent Nigerian Jurist
- Henry Adefope (1926–2012), Minister of External Affairs
- Henry Fajemirokun, Business Magnate
- Herbert Macaulay (1864–1946), surveyor and nationalist
- Israel Oludotun Ransome-Kuti (1891–1955), Educationist and father of Olikoye Ransome-Kuti, Beko Ransome-Kuti, and Fela Kuti
- Ibikunle Akitoye (1871–1928), Oba of Lagos
- J. K. Randle (1909–1956), Businessman and Socialite
- Karim Olowu (born 1924), athlete
- Kitoye Ajasa (1866–1937), lawyer and politician
- Niyi Adebayo (born 1958), Governor, Ekiti State
- Mobolaji Bank Anthony (11 June 1907 – 26 May 1991), President of the Lagos Stock Exchange
- Oguntola Sapara (1861–1935), medical doctor, gynaecologist.
- Ola Vincent (1925–2012), Governor of the Central Bank of Nigeria
- Oluyombo Awojobi (1963-2015), Rural Surgeon
- Oliver Ogedengbe Macaulay, son of Herbert Macaulay, journalist, and nationalist
- Remi Fani-Kayode (1921–95), politician
- Samuel Herbert Pearse (born 1865), businessman
- Samuel Manuwa (1903–76), surgeon
- Sodeinde Leigh-Sodipe (1865–1901), medical doctor
- Isaac Delano (1904-1979), author, linguist, teacher
- Talabi Braithwaite (1928–2011), insurance broker
- Taslim Olawale Elias (1914–91), Chief Justice of Nigeria
- Thomas King Ekundayo Phillips (1884–1969), musicologist, father of Nigerian church music
- Thomas Leighton Decker (1916–78), linguist and journalist
- T. O. S. Benson (1917–2008), lawyer, politician
- Tunji Sowande (1912–96), lawyer and musician
- Victor Adetunji Haffner (born 1919), engineer
- Wahab Goodluck (died 1991), President, Nigeria Labour Congress
- Nelson Amaine Okwuonu(died 2000), Engineer, attended Cambridge and Oxford. Participated in installation of the First Automatic Telephone Exchange in Nigeria

== See also ==
- List of schools in Lagos
