= Festus Segun =

Anglican bishop in Nigeria (1915-2024)

Festus Oluwole Segun (20 March 1915 – 2024) was a Nigerian Anglican bishop.

Segun was born in Ijebu Ode. He was educated at Our Saviour's Primary School in Ijebu Ode; St. Andrew's College in Oyo and Fourah Bay College, Sierra Leone.

Segun was ordained an Anglican deacon in 1951 and a priest in 1952. He held posts in Ebute Metta, Aroloya and Yaba. From 1956 to 1960 he studied at Union Theological Seminary in New York City before becoming a lecturer at St Augustine's College, Canterbury. On his return to Lagos, he was appointed provost of the Cathedral Church of Christ, Lagos, a post he held until 1970 when he became Bishop of Northern Nigeria. In 1975 he was translated to Lagos, a role that he retired from in 1985. He was also involved in the foundation of the Christian Association of Nigeria.
