= Adegboyega Edun =

Nigerian leader of the Egba people

The Honourable Adegboyega Edun
- Born: July 22, 1860; Sierra Leone
- Died: c.1925 Abeokuta, Nigeria
- Other name: The Reverend Jacob Henryson Samuel
- Occupations: Cleric and educator (pre-1902); Government administrator (post-1902)
- Known for: Being the secretary of the Egba United Government

Adegboyega Edun // (né Jacob Henryson Samuel; July 22, 1860 – c.1925) was an Egba official. He served as the secretary of the Egba United Government, a colonial-era Yoruba political entity.

== Life ==
A Saro, Edun was born in Sierra Leone on Sunday, July 22, 1860, to Egba parents. He attended Richmond Theological College, England, and matriculated at the University of London in 1887, where he was placed in the first division. He was a very brilliant scholar, and after graduating he began to function as a pastor and teacher. He was ordained as a minister in the Methodist Church. From 1893 to 1902, he was the principal of the Wesleyan Boy’s High School, Lagos. His public service at this time earned him the appreciation of the Governor of Lagos Colony, Sir William Macgregor.

On April 24, 1902, Edun relinquished the church ministry because he was offered the position as the Secretary of the Egba United Government (or E.U.G.). Edun succeeded William Alfred Allen, the first Secretary of the Egba United Government appointed by Governor Henry Mccallum in January 1898. Edun gave up his English name (Jacob Henryson Samuel) in 1904 and assumed the ancestral name of Adegboyega Edun. The E.U.G. was formed as a result of the decision of Sir Henry Mccallum in 1897, who was Lagos Colony Governor from 1897 to 1899. Governor Mccallum was succeeded by Governor Macgregor, who governed Lagos from 1899 to 1902. The new governor made the Egba to reorganise what was then called the “National Council”. This was emblematic of the rise of an educated elite in Egbaland, one that Edun belonged to. Some of Edun's contemporaries were C. B. Moore (Treasurer), J. Martin, and the Rev. D. O. Williams (Prime Minister from 1898 to 1911). With the rise of the E.U.G., the Ogboni lost its political significance. The E.U.G. was now saddled with the responsibility of advising the Alake of Egbaland in the discharge of his duties.

In May 1904, Edun accompanied the Alake, Oba Gbadebo, to England on a visit to King Edward VII. This was the first state visit by any Yoruba monarch to England. In 1913, Edun led a delegation of Southern Nigerians to England on matters relating to native land tenure. It was ultimately proven in 1921 that there were good grounds for the protest by the people who were against State ownership of native lands. Edun facilitated a good relationship between the white merchants and the Egba people, and he was pivotal to the modernization of administration and civilization in the land.

His tenure in office was not without controversy, as the death of Chief Ponlade of Ijemo while in the custody of his government led to calls - mostly from the Ijemos - for Edun to step down. The resulting civil unrest led to Abeokuta's absorption into the Colony and Protectorate of Nigeria shortly thereafter.

Edun weathered these storms relatively unscathed. He left government after the accession and spent his final years in quiet retirement.

He died about 1925.

== Achievements ==
The following achievements occurred during his tenure as Secretary of the E.U.G.:

1902: Establishment of European factories in the Ibara area of Abeokuta.

1903: Opening of Sokori Bridge, the first of its kind.

1904: Publication of the first issue of the E.U.G. Gazette in February.

1904: Establishment of the Egba Government Police Force.

1908: Establishment of Abeokuta Grammar School.

1908: Establishment of an E.U.G. hospital.

1914: Opening of the Abeokuta Water Works, which led to the eradication of guinea-worm and other water-borne diseases in the land, to the benefit of all.

On October 6, 1913, he was honoured by his people for his long service to the E.U.G. when he was presented with a Double Albert Gold Chain of rare original design and beauty, and of native workmanship, the pendant of which was a model of a human hand holding a pen in the act of writing; the whole thing being mounted in a flat ring, around which was inscribed the following: "Souvenir. A. Edun, Govt. Sec., E.U.G., 1912."

== Descendants ==
A notable contemporary descendant is Chief Wale Edun, the former minister of finance and coordinating minister for the economy in the Tinubu Administration.

Another notable descendant is the entertainer and TV host Denrele Edun.
