= Sodeinde Leigh-Sodipe =

Nigerian physician and early West African medical pioneer

- Born: Sodeinde Akinsiku Leigh-Sodipe; 21 March 1865; Lagos, Nigeria
- Died: 15 April 1901 (aged 36); Lagos, Nigeria
- Occupation: Doctor
- Spouse: Sabina Thomas (m. 1897)

Sodeinde Akinsiku Leigh-Sodipe (21 March 1865 – 15 April 1901) was a Nigerian doctor. He was one of the first West Africans to qualify as a medical doctor in the United Kingdom.

== Early life and education ==
Sodeinde was born on 21 March 1865 to the family of Consul and Mrs Leigh-Sodipe. Sodeinde attended the CMS Grammar School, Lagos from where he proceeded to the College of Medicine, University of Durham, Newcastle upon Tyne to study medicine and was awarded an M.B degree of Durham on the 30th of April, 1892. He wrote his M.D. thesis on "The relationship between nature and medical treatment with special reference to Native West African methods" and the University of Durham conferred the degree on him in absentia on 25 September 1897.

== Work ==
Upon his return home, Sodeinde established a private medical practice in the Lagos Colony and in 1896 he was appointed an Assistant Colonial Surgeon in the colonial medical service of Lagos. He served in Lagos, Ibadan, Saki, Badagry and Epe.

== Death ==
Sodeinde died in Lagos in 1901 at the age of 36.
