= Talabi Braithwaite =

Nigerian insurance broker

- Born: Talabi Adebayo Brathwaite; 2 July 1928; Lagos, Nigeria
- Died: 2 May 2011 (aged 82); London, England
- Occupation: Insurance broker
- Known for: First President of the Insurance Institute of Nigeria (IIN)

Talabi Adebayo Braithwaite (2 July 1928 – 2 May 2011) was a Nigerian insurance broker, and one of the leaders of the insurance industry in Nigeria. He was the first President of the Insurance Institute of Nigeria (IIN), now the Chartered Insurance Institute of Nigeria (CIIN).

== Life ==
Talabi Braithwaite was born on 2 July 1928 in Lagos. He attended the CMS Grammar School, Lagos and in 1946 obtained a first grade Senior Cambridge Certificate with exemption from London Matriculation. In 1949 he went to London where he gained experience in general insurance at the Royal Exchange, London. He was the first African to pass the examination to become an associate of the Chartered Insurance Institute, London in 1951.

== Career ==
Braithwaite returned to Nigeria in October 1952 to start the chief agency of the Law Union & Rock Insurance Company. In the 1950s he shared a flat on Hawley Street with Sonny Odogwu, who would also become a leader in the Nigerian corporate world, and Michael Kubenje. In 1958 he launched T.A. Braithwaite Insurance Brokers & Co. The company specialized in the new fields, for Nigeria, of Marine Insurance and Life Assurance Underwriting. In 1959 Braithwaite presided over the meeting of the Nigerian Insurance Consultative Committee that resolved to form the Insurance Institute of Nigeria, and was on the steering committee that planned for launch of the Institute. In 1960 Braithwaite and other Nigerian partners founded the Life Underwriting Company of African Alliance Insurance Company in partnership with the Munich Reinsurance Company.

Braithwaite advised the government of the Western Region of Nigeria in 1960 as a risk consultant when it formed the Great Nigeria Insurance Company. He assisted with setting up other insurance companies including the West African Provincial Company and the African Insurance Company. Between 1963 and 1966 Braithwaite was the first indigenous president of the Insurance Institute of Nigeria (IIN), the insurance industry's professional association. He was also first president of the Nigerian Corporation of Insurance Brokers for sixteen years starting in 1963. In 1969 he became an underwriting member of Lloyd's of London, and from 1 January 1970 started underwriting on the Merrett Syndicate. On 16 November 2000 President Olusegun Obasanjo made him a Commander of the Order of the Niger (CON).

Braithwaite's eldest child and daughter, Derin Braithwaite Disu, became chairman of the Lagos Island Local Government, adviser to Lagos State governor Babatunde Fashola and a well known socialite. Talabi Braithwaite died on 2 May 2011 in a London hospital, aged 82. He left a large fortune.

== Sources ==
- Ameyo Adadevyoh (2014-06-20). "THE UNTOLD STORY BEHIND DERIN DISU'S RESIGNATION FROM FASHOLA'S CABINET". The Elites Nigeria.
- "Demise of Braithwaite closes chapter in history – NCRIB". Vanguard. 2011-06-16.
- Nnamdi Duru (2011-05-05). "Doyen of Insurance, Talabi Braithwaite, Dies at 82". Archived from the original on 2015-04-02.
- Nwakanma, Obi (2010). Christopher Okigbo, 1930-67: Thirsting for Sunlight. Boydell & Brewer Ltd. ISBN 978-1-84701-013-1.
- "Our Board of Directors". T. A Braithwaite & Co.
