= Adelakun Howells =

Anglican bishop of Nigeria

Adelakun Williamson Howells OBE was an Anglican Bishop in the second half of the 20th century.

He was born on 17 September 1905, educated at King's College, Lagos and ordained in 1928. He was a Tutor at the CMS Training College at Awka and then held incumbenciesat Enugu and Fourah Bay. In 1951 he became Provost of Lagos and in 1955 its third Bishop, a post he held until his death on 7 March 1963.

== Notes ==
Church of England titles
Preceded by Leslie Gordon Vining	Bishop of Lagos; 1919 –1940	Succeeded by Seth Irunsewe Kale
