= Abimbola Adelakun =

Nigerian writer

- Born: Abimbola Adunni Adelakun; Ibadan, South-West Nigeria
- Education: University of Ibadan; University of Texas, Austin
- Occupation: Writer

Abimbola Adunni Adelakun is a Nigerian writer.

== Biography ==
Born in Ibadan, South-West Nigeria, she was educated at the University of Ibadan, where she graduated with a bachelor's degree and a Master of Arts degree in communication and language arts. She graduated as a Ph.D. holder in dance and theater at the University of Texas, Austin.

She works with The Punch newspaper in Lagos, Nigeria, as a writer. She studied modern African cultures as they are lived and performed, through the disciplinary lenses of performance, gender, Africana, and Yoruba studies. She writes academic articles, which have been published in various journals, among them the Journal of Women and Religion and Journal of Culture and African Women Studies. Her articles include:

- "Coming to America: Race, Class, Nationality and Mobility in 'African' hip hop", 2013;
- "Pentecostal Panopticism and the Phantasm of 'The Ultimate Power'" 2018;
- "The Spirit Names the Child: Pentecostal Names and Trans-ethics" 2020;
- "Black Lives Matter! Nigerian Lives Matter!: Language and Why Black Performance Matters", 2019;
- "Pastocracy: Performing Pentecostal politics in Africa", 2018;
- "Godmentality: Pentecostalism as performance in Nigeria", 2017;
- "The Ghosts of Performance Past: Theatre, Gender, Religion and Cultural Memory", 2017;
- "Spectacular Prophecies: Examining Pentecostal Power in Africa", 2017;
- "Remixing Religion: An Interdisciplinary Graduate Student Conference", 2014;
- "Yoruba Studies Review"
- "I am hated, therefore I am: The Enemy in Yorùbá Imaginary".

She is the author of the novel Under the Brown Rusted Roofs.
