= Olumide Lucas =

Historian clergy Nigeria

Jonathan Olumide Lucas (born 1897) was a Nigerian clergyman, educator and historian who is known for his work on the history of Yoruba traditional religion. As an author, he was among a group of West African historians who proposed a Hamitic origin of the people or of the cultural features of their ethnic group. Lucas work on Yoruba culture and language links some meaning and choice of words spoken by Yorubas with ancient Egypt.

Lucas was educated at Fourah Bay College, Durham University and as an external student of the University of London. Between 1932 and 1935, he was acting principal of CMS Grammar School, succeeding a trio of expatriate administrators. Lucas was a leading member of Lagos Union of Teachers which later merged with another association of teachers and headmasters to form the Nigerian Union of Teachers.

In 1944, he became the first vice president of the National Council of Nigeria and the Cameroons. He was father to Nigerian physician Adetokunbo Lucas.

== Works ==
- Lucas, Jonathan Olumide. An oration on the history of the Anglican Church in Lagos, 1852 to 1952. Delivered by J. Olumide Lucas at the Glover Memorial Hall, Lagos, on Monday, 14 January 1952. Lagos, Printed by Tika-Tore Press, 1952
- Lucas, Jonathan Olumide. The religion of the Yorubas, being an account of the religious beliefs and practices of the Yoruba peoples of southern Nigeria, especially in relation to the religion of ancient Egypt. Lagos [Nigeria] C. M. S. Bookshop, 1948.
- Lucas, Jonathan Olumide. Yoruba language : its structure and relationship to other languages / by J. Olumide Lucas. 1964. Lagos. Ore Ki Gbe Press.
