= Victor Adetunji Haffner =

Nigerian communications engineer

- Born: 1 September 1919; Lagos State
- Died: 5 November 2015 (aged 96)
- Occupation: Telecom engineer
- Known for: President of the Administrative Council of the International Telecommunication Union

Victor Adetunji Haffner (1 September 1919 – 5 November 2015) was a Nigerian communications engineer. He was trained as an engineer in England during the colonial era, then returned to Nigeria in 1956 where he held increasingly senior positions in the state-owned Nigerian PTT (Post, Telegraph and Telephone) or its NET subsidiary. He represented Nigeria in various international telecom forums. In 1975 he was dismissed by the military regime, and became a consultant to a large Japanese company for many years.

== Early years ==
Victor Adetunji Haffner was of creole descent, born at Haffner Street in Central Lagos on 1 September 1919. His family originated in Freetown, Sierra Leone, and migrated to Nigeria after slavery was abolished. His mother, Victoria Adepeju, was a niece of the lawyer John Augustus Otunba Payne (1839–1906), first African registrar of the Supreme Court of Nigeria. His father, Frederick Mathew Haffner, was a civil servant in the Lagos City Council. His mother was born in Lagos into a family that originated in Ibadan, and his father was from Abeokuta.

Haffner attended Christ Church School at Faji in Lagos for his primary education and then went on to CMS Grammar School, Lagos. He was a classmate of Akintola Williams at the CMS Grammar School, and they remained friends for life. Haffner passed the senior Cambridge Examination in 1938 with high marks, and was exempted from the London Matriculation Examination. He moved to England where he attended Northampton Polytechnic, now City University, London and the Regent Street Polytechnic, London. He graduated from the Institution of Electrical Engineers in 1954 and joined the Nigerian Department of Posts and Telegraphs, who sponsored his further training with the British Post Office, and Marconi Wireless Telegraph Company in Chelmsford, England.

== Career ==
In 1956 Haffner returned to Nigeria where he was assigned by the Posts and Telegraphs Department to Kano, in charge of the Aeronautical, Meteorological and Police Communications Network. He returned to Lagos in 1957 and was appointed Wireless Engineer, Colony. He married Grace Olubunmi Majekodunmi from Abeokuta that year. He next moved to the Transmission and Radio Division of the PTT with responsibility for planning and installing radio systems across Nigeria. In 1962 he became Assistant Engineer-in-Chief. On 1 January 1963 Haffner was seconded to Nigerian External Telecommunications Limited (NET), a newly founded company, as Managing Director responsible for development projects. The company had acquired the assets of Cable & Wireless, which now held 49% while the government held 51%.

Haffner became President of the Council for the Regulation of Engineering in Nigeria (COREN) and Fellow of the Nigerian Society of Engineers. He represented Nigeria in many international telecom forums. From 1969 to 1972 he represented Nigeria at the International Communications Satellite Systems Conferences in Washington DC. In 1974 he became President of the Administrative Council of the International Telecommunication Union. In 1975 the military regime merged NET with the Nigerian PT&T to form NITEL. Haffner was dismissed and started a private telecom consultancy, advising Marubeni of Japan.

Haffner's wife died in 2007 aged 81. In September 2014 he celebrated his 95th birthday. He died in 2015 aged 96.

== Sources ==
- Dapo Fafowora (2014-11-06). "On the memoirs of Pa Victor Adetunji Haffner". The Nation.
- "Engr. Victor Adetunji Haffner". The Nigerian Academy of Engineering. 2013.
- Past Perfect (2011-07-23). "I've been involved in many accidents – Engr. Haffner". The Vanguard.
