= Olumuyiwa Jibowu =

Nigerian jurist

Sir Olumuyiwa Jibowu
- Born: 26 August 1899; Abeokuta
- Died: 1 June 1959 (aged 59); Ibadan, British Nigeria
- Education: Abeokuta Grammar School; Oxford University
- Occupation: Jurist
- Spouses: Celia Alakija; Deborah Jibowu
- Children: 8
- Parents: Samuel Alexander Adebowale Jibowu (father); Mary Elizabeth Jibowu (mother)

Sir Olumuyiwa Jibowu, Kt (26 August 1899 – 1 June 1959) was a Nigerian jurist who was the first African to serve on the Supreme Court of Nigeria. The first African police magistrate, the first Nigerian High Court judge, a pioneer of the Nigerian Judiciary and one-time Chief Justice of the Western Region, Nigeria. Jibowu was also a judge of the West African Court of Appeal.

== Life and career ==
Samuel Olumuyiwa Jibowu was the first surviving male child of Samuel Alexander Adebowale Jibowu, the first person to serve as secretary of the Egba United Government, and Mary Elizabeth Jibowu (née Pearce). Through his marriage to his first wife Celia, he was a nephew-in-law to Sir Adeyemo Alakija. Born on August 26, 1899, he attended Abeokuta Grammar School and taught at the school prior to attending college. In 1919, he left Nigeria for London where he attended Oxford University, England and earned a degree in Civil Law. He was called to the bar in 1923 at Middle Temple, London. By 1931, he was a police magistrate, the first African to hold such a position during the time colonial authorities doubted the integrity of Africans. In 1942, he was appointed as a Judge of the High Court. He later became a puisne Judge at the High Court in Benin City and in 1957, he was appointed as the Chief Justice of the Lagos High Courts and the Southern Cameroons. He was the only black magistrate in Nigeria before 1934 and was respected for his sterling principles.

In March 1958, he succeeded Adetokunbo Ademola as the Chief Justice of the Western region. Jibowu was highly regarded and among those present at his funeral service included: James Wilson Robertson, Kofo Abayomi, John Rankine, Samuel Akintola and a number of Supreme Court Justices.

=== Commission of Enquiry ===
In 1956, Jibowu was appointed to head an enquiry into the management of the Cocoa Purchasing Company, a semi-governmental company formed to compete against expatriate firms and to act as an agency for loan disbursement. The report of the commission detailed instances of corrupt practices by officials of the company. The company was used as a conduit of patronage benefiting allies of company officials and for the furtherance of the political activities of its leaders. The critical report led partly to the abolishment of a loan scheme that was previously open to cocoa farmers.
