= Adebesin Folarin =

Nigerian judge (1877–1949)

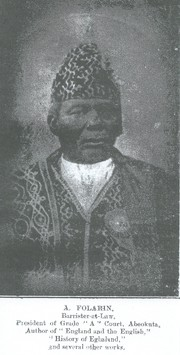
Adebesin Folarin

Chief Adebesin Folarin (also known as Josiah Folarin Williams, Josiah Fitzac Folarin and Debeshin Folarin) (1877 – 4 October 1949) was a Nigerian barrister, judge, public official, historian and author. He was one of the leading intellectuals in early 20th-century Abeokuta, and is recognised as "one of the first truly nationalist historians" in Nigeria.

== The Williams Family ==
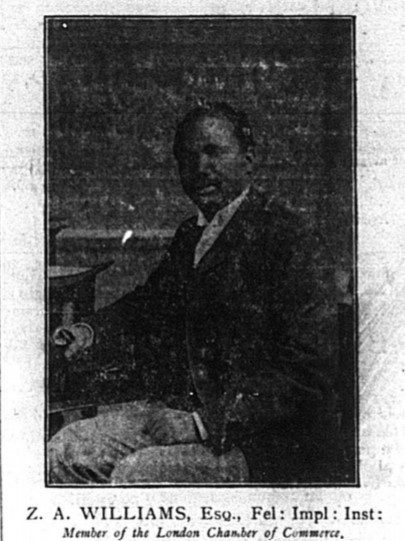
Adebesin Folarin's father, Z. A. Williams

Josiah Folarin Williams was born in Abeokuta, Southern Nigeria, in 1877. He was the first son of Zachariah Archibald Williams (commonly known as Z. A. Williams) (1850 – 2 March 1912), who was a Merchant Prince of Abeokuta and one of the most successful businessmen in Nigeria at the time.^{[cn]}

=== Z. A. Williams ===
Z. A. Williams started his first business in 1870 at the age of 20, and in 1877 relocated his business to Lagos, where he dealt mainly in cotton goods. Soon after, Williams started a business in Idunshagbe, Lagos. He visited England for the first time in June 1880, where he made arrangements to establish a much larger business in Lagos. He returned in October 1880 and established a business on the Marina, in a building which, at the time, was called Manchester House.

In 1883, Williams made a fortune of £30,000 (equivalent to £3,742,000 in 2021), and in that same year travelled again to England to join his wife, who had travelled before him. In February 1885, he established a factory at Porto Novo, where the turnover in eleven months amounted to £11,000 (equivalent to £1,450,000 in 2021). In 1884, his business in Lagos was valued at £60,000 (equivalent to £7,650,0000 in 2021).

Williams was present at the Colonial and Indian Exhibition in 1886, along with several other prominent "native gentlemen" and women from Lagos. Other Lagos representatives included Mr. and Mrs. J. A. O. Payne, Mr. and Mrs. J. J. Thomas, Richard Beale Blaize, Mr. N. T. B. Shepherd and James Johnson (Assistant Bishop of Western Equatorial Africa).

He paid further visits to England in 1887 and 1889, following which he retired from business. His main exports were palm oil, palm kernels, ivory and cotton. He had branch factories at Broad Street, Itolo, Offin, Victoria Road, Martin Street and Abeokuta. He employed two Europeans, over 20 "Native Clerks" and a general contingent of 100 Krooboys.

Williams was also a prominent landowner. In 1895 he owned 1,000 acres in Isheri, 500 acres in each of Jebu Ode, Abeokuta, Igbologun and Porto Novo, and over 100 acres in Ikoyi in Lagos. He also owned a villa on Broad Street, which was leased to the Colonial Government, and "Manchester House" on the Marina, which was leased to the Lagos Stores and Tomlinson Ltd.

In celebration of Queen Victoria's jubilee in 1887, Williams subscribed £100 (equivalent to £13,487.80 in 2021) towards the construction of the Glover Memorial Hall in Lagos. Williams was one of four African members of the Lagos Chamber of Commerce when it was founded in 1888. The other African members were Richard Beale Blaize, J.W. Cole and J.J. Thomas, all of whom were also prominent businessmen at the time. His successful business career earned him the nickname "the native Napoleon of West African Commerce".

=== Samuel Osanyintade "Daddy Sam" Williams ===
Folarin's paternal grandparents were Samuel Osanyintade and Lucy Williams. Samuel Williams (known within the family as 'Daddy Sam') was an Abeokuta trader and the patriarch of the prominent Williams family. Despite having a European surname, Daddy Sam was not a Saro.

The tribal wars of the early 19th century forced the Egba people to migrate from their homesteads and seek refuge under the Olumo Rock in Abeokuta, where they established a new settlement. Among those refugees was a young farmer named Osanyintade, who established a business in Itoko, Abeokuta. Osanyintade became a Christian and was baptised by Samuel Ajayi Crowther. Crowther did not accept Osanyintade as a baptismal name, and so he adopted the name of Samuel.

Daddy Sam was a native farmer and trader, and supplied farm produce to one of the early European exporters in Abeokuta named Eugene Thomas Williams of Manchester, from whom it is said he adopted the name 'Williams'. Daddy Sam's descendants included many prominent national figures such as Frederick Rotimi Williams, Akintola Williams, Eric O. Moore (father of Kofoworola Ademola), Oyinkansola Abayomi, John Taylor, Ernest Shonekan and several others.

== Early life and education ==
Folarin moved from Abeokuta to Lagos along with his father in 1879, and like his father, he was educated at the CMS Grammar School, Lagos. He was tutored by James Pearse, a Lagos clergyman who was also tutor to Ladapo Ademola, Eric O. Moore (who was Folarin's first cousin and the father of Lady Ademola) and J. K. Coker.

After leaving school, Folarin sought employment in the mercantile houses in Lagos for a brief period. He went on to work in Calabar, and then to Congo as a Clerk. After 8 years he moved to Cameroon to start a business of his own with his savings. His business rapidly developed and after 7 years he had opened 9 branches of his own establishments.

Folarin changed his name from Josiah Folarin Williams to Josiah Fitz-zack Folarin on 14 April 1906.

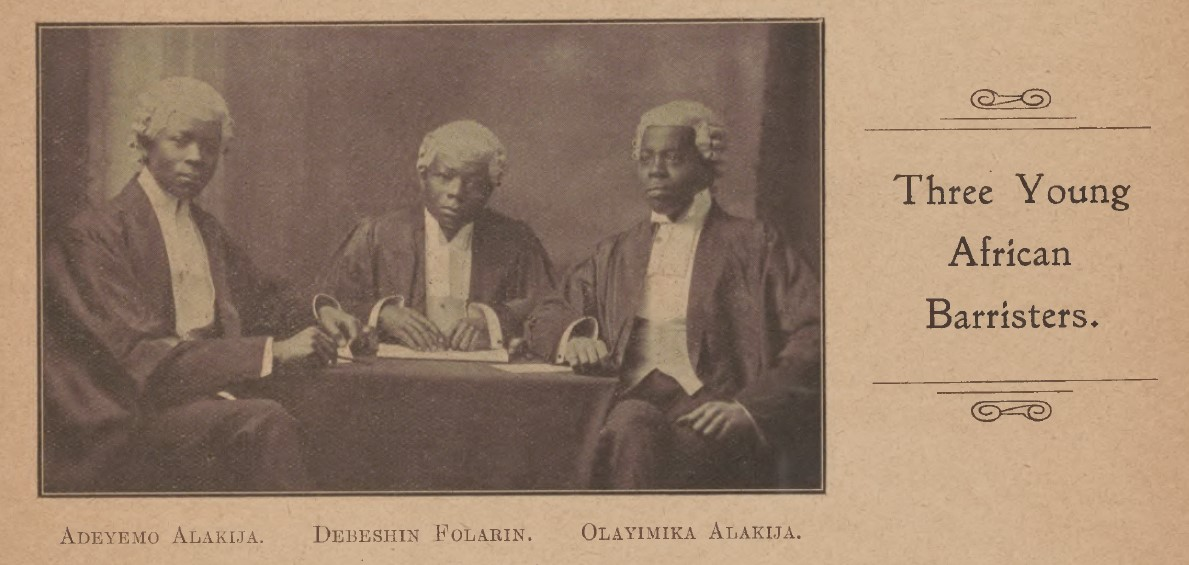
Adeyemo Alakija, Debesin Folarin and Olayimika Alakija

He travelled to England in 1910 and joined the Middle Temple. While in England, he lived at 14 Guilford Street. He was called to the bar at Middle Temple on 16 April 1913 with twin brothers Adeyemo Alakija and Olayimika Alakija. A biography of all three men was featured in the May 1913 edition of the African Times and Orient Review.

Towards the end of his time in England, Folarin wrote a book entitled "England and the English: Personal Impressions during a Three Years' Sojourn" which was published by John Taylor in London and was dedicated to his cousin, Eric O. Moore, "in the confident hope that he will spare no effort to collaborate in fostering in our race those elements of unity and self-respect which are so essential to national progress and national independence". The book painted a vivid (and complementary) picture of England as a place, the English people, their mode of government, habits and pastimes.

During his time in England, Folarin developed a deep sense of patriotism and at times in this book criticised (often in very blunt terms, which he was known for) the tendency of Nigerians to idolise the English rather than taking pride in their own achievements and culture . Folarin's view is summarised in the following excerpt:

People without a sense of honour, or feeling of self-respect, deserve no respect or honour from others. We are told that the smallest State in Europe has produced its heroes, men of arts and letters, and that of all the world Africa (Negro-land) alone has failed. Is this true? Is this correct? No! We had our heroes, we have our men of arts, but no history to record and immortalise their fame – no monument to inspire the rising generation with the valorous spirit of their ancestors. Why? Because we will not take the pain and trouble. Because we are too indolent to exercise our intelligence… In short, our cringing tendency, our parasitical partiality, our want of aspiration for freedom, our dislike of one another, our disinclination to form definite societies of our own, are the reasons, yea, the justifiable reasons, why we are looked down upon as nonentities, and despised.

Folarin also saw embracing Egba culture, including names, language and dress, as important aspects of cultivating a sense of patriotism:

We have constituted ourselves the greatest race of imitators and fetish worshippers that ever existed on the globe. Rescued from bondage we still retain the brand of slavery by glorying in foreign names, abandoning our dress in preference to theirs; condemning our customs without any effort to resuscitate or improve on them, courting their societies and associations even in this country in contempt of our own; cringing to them and undermining our own manliness as becomes a slave. Devoid of patriotism and self-respect we tacitly, yea, even in actual fact, sold to them our persons, our goods and our fatherland.

In doing so, Folarin represented the new, post-Victorian generation of young Nigerians who were deeply patriotic, nationalistic and focused on the advancement of Egba culture. As a result, Folarin changed his name from Josiah Fitzac Folarin to Adebesin Folarin by way of a deed dated 10 June 1913. His law school classmates Placido and Honorio Assumpcao also changed their names to Adeyemo and Olayimika Alakija around the same time.

The sense of patriotism that Folarin developed while he was in England inspired him to spend his later career in Abeokuta, the capital of Egbaland, rather than pursuing a legal career in Lagos or a political position on the national level, unlike his friends and classmates the Alakijas or his cousin Eric O. Moore, who went on to occupy prominent positions in national politics. He returned to Nigeria in July 1913, shortly after he was called to the bar at the Middle Temple.

== Return to Nigeria ==
In December 1913 he was elected Assistant Secretary of The Lagos Auxiliary of the Anti-Slavery and Aborigines Rights Protection Society. His friend and classmate at law school, Adeyemo Alakija, was elected as Secretary.

Folarin was known as a strong advocate of racial equality and fought for the rights of the native people in colonial Nigeria. At a meeting of the Lagos Auxiliary of the Anti-Slavery and Aborigines Rights Protection Society on 1 September 1919, he gave a speech in which he stated the following:

We have known a long time ago that there are different kinds of people and different countries in the world. There are white, black, and men of other colour; but when we come to think of their character, we find that all men are almost alike except in the languages they speak.

In 1914, he was offered and accepted the post of Legal Adviser and Law Officer in the Egba United Government.

Folarin was highly critical of the Government's conduct in the Ijemo tragedy which occurred later that year. His 1916 publication entitled "The Demise of the Independence of Egbaland: The Ijemo Trouble" was dedicated "to the memories of the victims of the Ijemo massacre". His views made it impossible for him to remain an officer of the Government, and so he returned to Lagos to continue his legal career in private practice from his home at 36 Breadfruit Street, Lagos.

Folarin was one of the founding members of the Abeokuta "Reform Club", which was established in 1915 to assist the Egba United Government restore and preserve peace in Egbaland. He held the position of Secretary. He wrote a lengthy article in the 2 November 1915 edition of the Time of Nigeria in which he lamented "the massacre of the Ijemo people, the total reduction into beggary of many an Egba citizen by the atrocities attending the massacre and the recent impressment of some Egba citizens as carriers in the Cameroon expedition". Folarin argued that the only way to remedy the issues which were causing significant social unrest, was peaceful lobbying by constitutional means:

This fact again is incapable of comprehension to the illiterate masses except to the educated few. It is therefore highly essential for the illumination of the darkness of the masses that they be brought into close contact with the enlightened elements of the community so that they may understand and know that reform could be advocated for and grievances complained of, not by beating the drum and ringing the tocsin, not by brandishing sticks and machetes and uproariously parading the streets, but by constitutional means, by force of reason and by public opinion.

The Reform Club held political meetings both publicly and privately to discuss political questions and ventilate grievances.

The proposal was controversial, and caused uproar amongst a faction of the political elite in Lagos. In a subsequent editorial in the Times of Nigeria, the author issued a scathing rebuke of Folarin's editorial, writing:

Mr. Folarin will be well advised if he could but realise the grave danger of playing pranks with dangerous firebrands which might cause a great political conflagration in Egbaland, to the destruction and ruin of his country.

J. K. Coker, another prominent Egba native, defended Folarin in the 17 November 1915 edition of the Lagos Standard. He described Folarin as an "honourable patriotic lawyer" and stated that "I have confidence in this Reform Club and unhesitatingly prophesy that it will not in any way clash with the government but will soon work in such a way as to gain the confidence and admiration of the government".

In 1916, Folarin attempted to conduct an enquiry into the 1916 Okeho-Iseyin riots but was ordered to leave. He returned, disguised as a travelling Hausa Muslim. In order to stay hidden, he avoided the more comfortable railway and motor routes and travelled by caravan. He successfully conducted his enquiries after 14 days and published his report in a pamphlet entitled Oke Iho-Isehin Escapade. In his report, he found that the riots were directed more against the oppressive regime of the Alaafin and his retainers than the system of Indirect Rule.

On 29 March 1920, Folarin was one of three men elected to the Lagos Town Council, in the first ever democratic election held in Nigeria (the others were Richard Akinwande Savage and George Debayo Agbebi). He secured the most votes out of all of the candidates.

== Later career ==
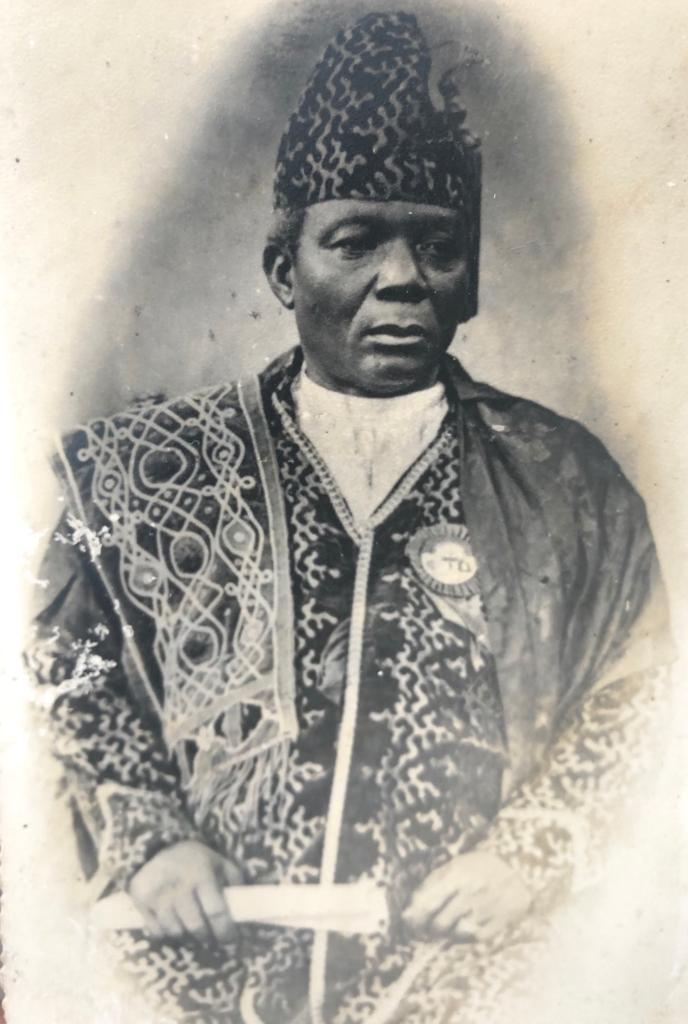
Adebesin Folarin in traditional attire

When his close friend Ladapo Ademola was crowned Ademola II of Abeokuta, Folarin relocated and settled in Abeokuta, where he was considered one of the leading intellectuals. Folarin was one of two individuals accompanying Alake Ademola on the dias during his coronation (the other being J. O. George, judge in the Ake Native Court). His younger brother, Nat Fehintola Williams, was also in attendance at the coronation.

Folarin was one of Alake Ademola's closest advisers, and was granted the honorary chieftaincy titles of: Bobajiro (Oba's adviser), Otunbaloye of Igbore. Alake Ademola engaged Folarin to document the history of the Egba people and codify its customary laws. His texts included A short historical review of the life of the Egbas from 1829 to 1930 (1931) and The laws and customs of Egba-land (1939), both of which are reference books in leading libraries around the world, including Harvard and Yale University Libraries and the British Library. His books have also been cited by the Federal Supreme Court of Nigeria.

He established the Egba National Harper in March 1926 with Akin Adeshigbin as editor, but they only produced a few editions. He also established the Nigerian Law Journal in December 1921, and served as its editor. Folarin was one of the early proponents of women's rights to inheritance in Nigeria. He wrote a stinging critique of Mr Justice Pennington's judgments in Saka Agoro v. Barikisu Osi Epe and Adisatu Morenikeji [1920] Supreme Court Suit No. 324, writing:

the portion of Mr Justice Pennington's judgment in the Divisional Court in the case of Saka Agoro versus Busura Osi Epe and Adisatu Morenike reported in our last issue which reads: "Adisatu Morenikeji had no right of inheritance in her father's property" impelled a dispensation with all formality and punctiliousness. This doctrine so industriously propounded time after time by Mr Justice Pennington whenever any action relating to women's rights to property comes before the Court is not only listened to with bewilderment by the native community owing to its exoticism but it is tremblingly apprehended that if it is allowed to be imbibed by the male sex of this clime its germination will have no other result but the pernicious severance of the sacred tie which binds a family together

Folarin argued that native law and custom recognizes equality of rights between male and female children. Mr Justice Pennington and Folarin published several arguments and counterarguments in the following editions of the NLJ. Olayimika Alakija, Folarin's law school classmate, also published articles on this issue in the Nigerian Law Journal, but his articles supported Mr Justice Pennington's conclusions.

In January 1925, Folarin made the first proposals for the formation of a national bar association. He argued that a centralised association would suppress or fight the incidences of dishonourable conducts or practices among members, set up and maintain a law library with adequate reading rooms, revise existing laws and monitor the promulgation of new ones. The Nigerian Bar Association was eventually constituted in 1960.

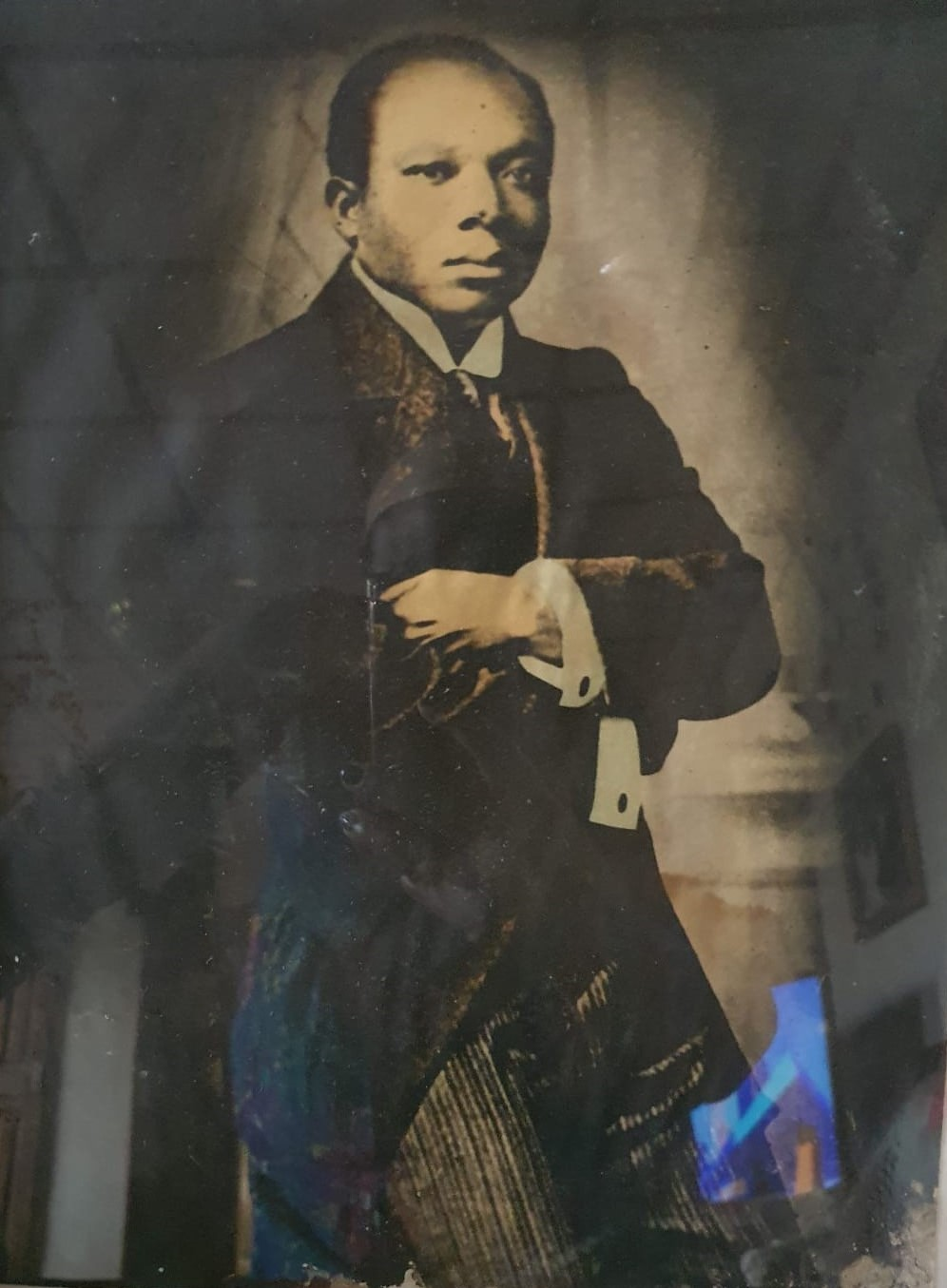
Adebesin Folarin

Following a successful legal and political career, in 1929 he was appointed as the President of the Grade "A" Customary Court in Abeokuta, a position which he held until his retirement on pension in 1941. Presidents of customary courts at the time tended to be tribal chiefs; Folarin was the first barrister elected to any customary court in Nigeria. Alake Ademola had initially proposed to appoint Folarin in 1925. However the Alake's rivals in the Egba Council - in particular Suberu Adedamola (then Osile of Oke-Ona) - objected to the move on the grounds that it was derogatory to his dignity and the dignity of the other kinglings that a subordinate official should be placed on equal footing with them in salary. In reality, they objected to Folarin's appointment because he was regarded as a close friend of Alake Ademola.

Folarin was succeeded on the Court in 1941 by Cambridge educated barrister Abiola Akiwumi, son of famous Abeokuta merchant S. O. Akiwumi.

== Death ==
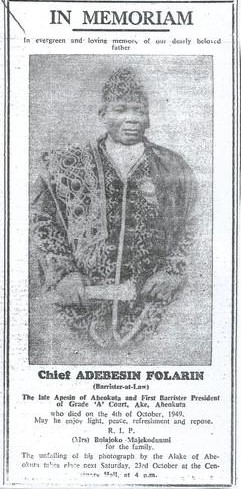
Adebesin Folarin's Memorial Program

Folarin died on 4 October 1949 after a lengthy period of illness. At the time of his death, he held the titles of Apesin of Itoko, Bobajiro (titles which his nephew, Chief Frederick Rotimi Williams would later inherit) and Otunbaloye of Igbore. His photograph was unveiled by Alake Ademola on 23 October 1949 at the Centenary Hall.

== Personal life ==
In his schooldays, Folarin developed a reputation for his frankness and competitive nature. The following was written about him by an unknown author in the Lagos Standard edition dated 26 January 1916:

Writing of this gentleman reminds me of how, in his school days, it used to be his hobby to challenge his classmates to a display of their knowledge of English. In and out of season he was bent on improving his English, and I was very often drawn in a debate with him from which I did not always emerge victorious. To day he is reaping the reward of those "debates" and I am proud to see the good use he is endeavouring to be to his country. May he not weary in well-doing.

That trend continued into his professional career. When Folarin was elected to the Lagos Town Council, an article in the Lagos Weekly Record dated 5 June 1920 described him in the following terms:

Mr. Folarin has always been keenly interested in local politics and although he is rather brusque and sometimes uncomfortably frank in his political writings, we are sure he will make a very useful councillor.

Folarin was also a keen musician, and contributed to the musical entertainment at a number of high profile events including a dinner held in honour of his cousin, Eric O. Moore, at St. George's Hall, Lagos, on 2 March 1917.

He was married to Aurelia Taiwo Folarin.

His children included:

- Mrs Bolajoko Majekodumni;
- Mrs Titilola Akinyemi (who – along with Adenrele Ademola, daughter of Alaiyeluwa Ademola II and Prince Ademola's sister), directed the social committee of the West African Students Union into the late 1930s, and served as WASU's Treasurer in 1937;
- Mr Adebayo Folarin;
- Mr Olaoluwa Folarin;
- Mrs Agbeke Henshaw;
- Mrs Rosaline Abioye Orimoloye (28 September 1933 – 16 April 2021), who was a former Principal Nursing Sister at the University of Lagos. In 1962 she married Patrick Oluwole Orimoloye, who was Secretary General and Chief Executive of the Nigerian Red Cross Society;
- Chief Mrs Ijiola Ogun; and
- Mrs Olatokewa Philomena Giwa, a former Principal Nursing Officer, who was married to Professor FBA Giwa of the Physics Department, University of Ibadan.

== Publications ==
- The Demise of Independence of Egbaland: The Ijemo Trouble. Lagos: Tika-Tore (1916)
- A Study of some of our Judges. Lagos: Tika-Tore Printing Works (1919)
- A Short Historical Review of the Life of the Egbas from 1829 to 1930 (1931)
- England and the English: Personal Impressions during a Three Years' Sojourn (London: John Taylor)
- The Ogboni and Other Chieftaincies in Abeokuta, Their Purports and Meanings (1934)
- The Laws and Customs of Egbaland (1939)
