= Egba United Government =

Egba government that existed before the present-day Nigeria and Benin

Egba United Government Ìjọba Ẹ̀gbá (Yoruba)
- c. 1830 – c. 1918
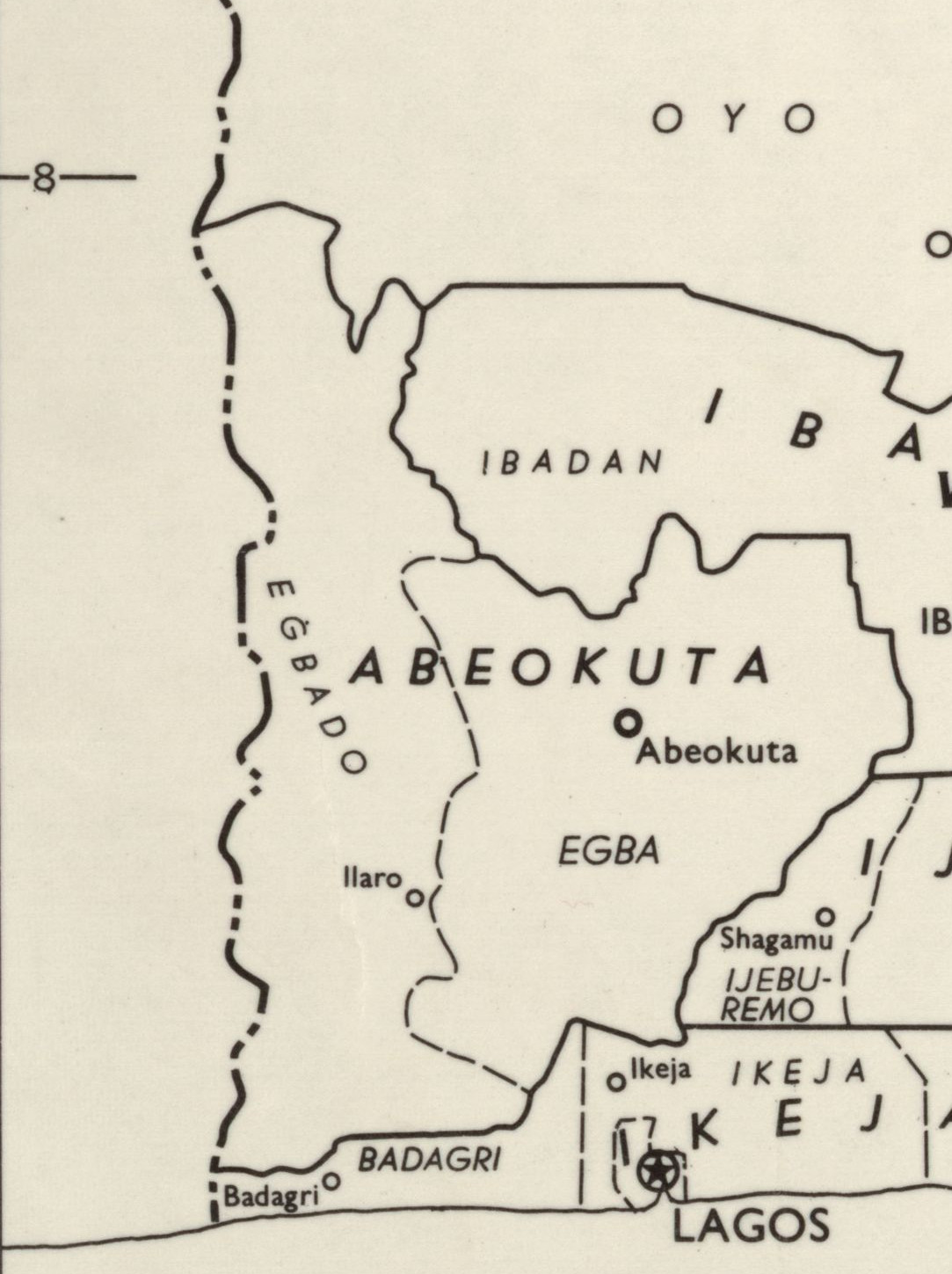
- Egba-Egbado land
- Status: sovereign states
- Capital: Abeokuta
- Common languages: Yoruba, English
- Religion: Yoruba religion, Christianity, Islam
- Government: Constitutional Hereditary Monarchy with Representative assembly features.
- Alake of Egbaland (title)
  - c. 1892 – c. 1918: Tegumada Ademola
- Legislature: Ọ̀gbọ̀ni Ẹ̀gbá

Area
- 1830: 6,000 km^{2} (2,300 sq mi)
- Currency: Cowrie, Barter
Preceded by	Succeeded by
Oyo Empire	Republic of Dahomey; Southern Nigeria Protectorate
- Today part of: Yorubaland · Nigeria · Benin

The Egba United Government (EUG) was a short-lived but significant government established in the late 19th century by the Egba-Egbado people, a subgroup of the Yoruba ethnic group, in what is now South-western Nigeria and Eastern Benin. Mainly in response to external threats from neighbouring kingdoms, such as the Dahomey and the collapsed Oyo Empire, the Egba towns and villages began to come together to form a loose confederacy, which was later formalized into the Egba United Government in 1893.

In 1898, the government was formally recognized and established by the Lagos Colony Governor, McCallum, at a meeting organized with William Alfred Allen, who was the Colonial Government Agent in Abeokuta and an Egba man from Iporo Ake. This event occurred at the end of the Yoruba civil wars in 1893, making the EUG one of Africa's legally existing governments and nation-states (according to contemporary international laws), ensuring its independence during the Scramble for Africa. William Alfred Allen was appointed the first Secretary to the Government by the Colonial government while the Egba rulers were given government portfolios. Eventually, Allen was succeeded by Adegboyega Edun.

== Background ==
Following the decline of the Oyo Empire in the early 19th century and the Egba independence from the empire, the several independent Egba towns and villages engaged in a series of conflicts and wars with the Dahomey, which spanned 1843 to 1851, making it a major conflict in West Africa during the 19th century. The causes of the Egba-Dahomey War were rooted in the Dahomey Kingdom's expansionist policies and the Egba people's resistance to their territorial expansion. The tension and conflicts spiralled as result of the territorial ambitions of the kingdom, under the leadership of Ghezo, who wanted to expand its influence and control over neighbouring states, including the Egba people. Further, the Dahomey Kingdom was heavily involved and gained in the slave trade, as many people were captured from neighbouring towns and villages and sold to the Europeans, creating a resentment among the Egba towards the Dahomey.

The conflict escalated when the Dahomey army captured some Egba towns and took prisoners, some of whom were later sacrificed in Dahomey's traditional religious ceremonies. This sparked outrage among the Egba people, who decided to fight back and defend their territory. Influential Egba people, including the wealthy merchant Efunroye Tinubu, Landuji Oshodi, and Sodeke, combined their efforts to form a loose confederacy, the Egba Confederacy. The confederacy was led by a council of leaders, known as the "Egba Council of Chiefs", who were representatives of various Egba towns and villages. The war eventually expanded to the populous Egba town of Abeokuta, and in 1851, the Egba forces, led by their commander-in-chief, Sodeke, defeated the Dahomey army in a decisive battle.

The consequences of the war on the Dahomey was its decline, as most of their army were lost in the conflicts. The kingdom was eventually absorbed into the French colonial Empire in the late 19th century. The Egba people, on the other hand, became an important regional power, influencing the formation of the EUG, which transitioned into the prominence of the Egba in Nigerian and Benin politics.

== Structure ==
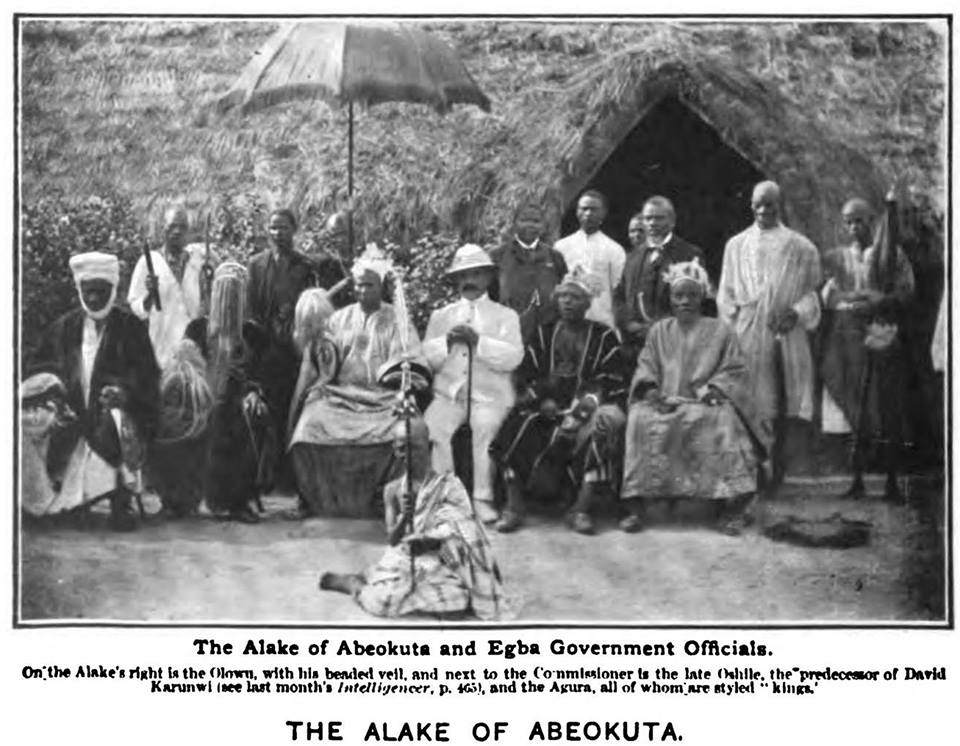
The Alake, Egba Government Officials, and the Lagos Colony Governor

The EUG had a complex structure, with several layers of administration. The government was divided into several departments, including:

- Council of Chiefs: The Council of Chiefs was the highest decision-making body in the EUG. It was composed of representatives from each of the Egba city-states, who were chosen by their respective communities. The Chiefs were headed by the Alake, and other chiefs elected into the title of Olori Parakoyi, Seriki, Apena, and Balogun. This Council of Chiefs was responsible for making laws, resolving disputes, and coordinating the military efforts of the Egba people.
- Olori Parakoyi (Secretary): The Olori Parakoyi was the democratic head of the government. He was chosen by the Council of Chiefs and served as the chief executive of the government. The Olori Parakoyi was responsible for implementing the decisions of the Council of Chiefs and for representing the Egba people in external affairs.
- Iwarefa: The Iwarefa was a group of high-ranking officials who served as advisors to the Olori Parakoyi. They were responsible for providing counsel on matters of state and for helping to implement the decisions of the Council of Chiefs.
- Ogboni: The Ogboni was a secret society that played a key role in the government. Members of the Ogboni were chosen for their wisdom, courage, and integrity, and they served as judges, mediators, and advisors to the government.
- City-State Governments: Each of the Egba city-states had its own government, which was responsible for managing local affairs. The city-state governments were headed by a chief or king, who was responsible for collecting taxes, maintaining law and order, and providing services to the community.

== Prominent Figures of the Government ==
=== Tegumada Ademola ===
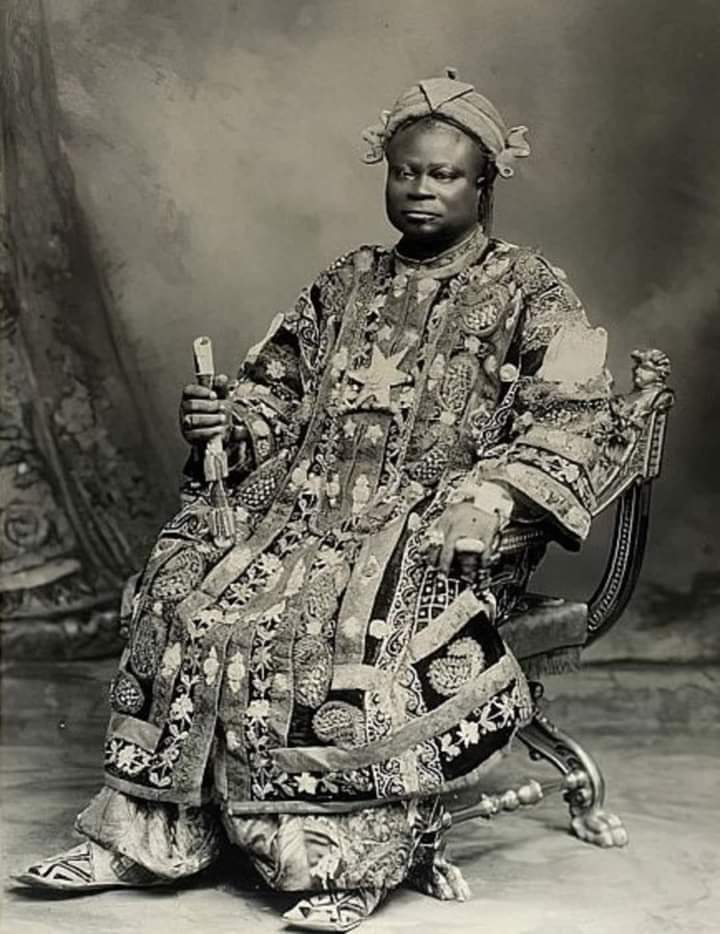
Tegumada Ademola (Gbadebo I, Alake of Egba)

Tegumada Ademola (Gbadebo I) was the sixth Alake of Egba land who ruled from 1892 to 1920. Alake Gbadebo was born in 1854. His father, Okukenu Sagbua, was the first Alake after the Egba migration to Abeokuta. Gbadebo's sovereignty was interrupted in 1918 with the termination of the Egba Unity Government, which educated elites had helped him arrange with his ascension to power. The British ruled indirectly through him after the subsumption of his territory under their government. Gbadebo attended church services, breaking with traditional religious customs of the Egba. His admiration for Britain also took him to London in 1904. There, he made acquaintance of King Edward VII of England who on the eve of his return to Lagos, presented him with a copy of the Bible.

=== Ladapo Ademola ===
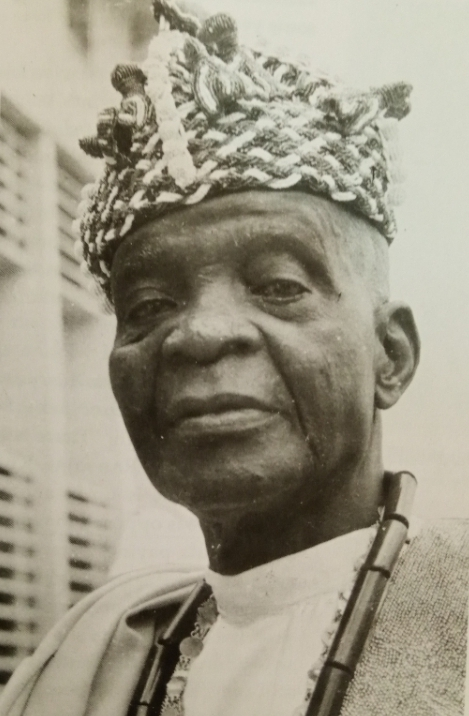
Ladapo Ademola

Oba Sir Ladapo Samuel Ademola KBE CMG (1872–1962), also known as Ademola II, was the Alake of Abeokuta from 1920 to 1962. Before he was crowned Alake, Ademola was involved in the affairs of the Egba United Government. As a member of the Egba council, he was a leading participant in negotiations with the Lagos State colonial government in 1889 for the rights to construct railway tracks passing through Egbaland. In 1904 he travelled with Alake Gbadebo to the U.K., where they were received by King Edward VII. He succeeded Oba Gbadebo in 1920 with overwhelming votes from the Egba council.

=== Olumuyiwa Jibowu ===
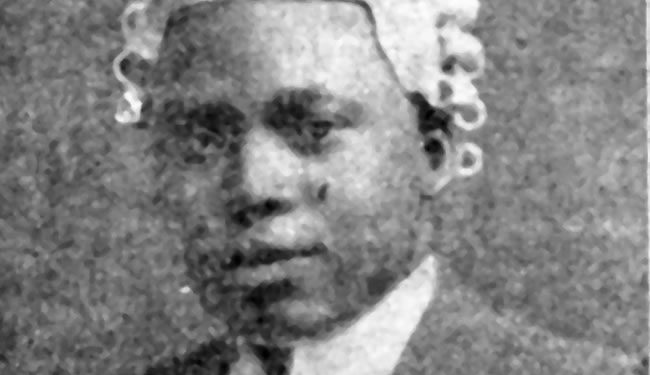
Olumuyiwa Jibowu

Sir Olumuyiwa Jibowu, Kt (26 August 1899 – 1 June 1959) was a Nigerian jurist who was the first African to serve on the Supreme Court of Nigeria. The first African police magistrate, the first Nigerian High Court judge, a pioneer of the Nigerian Judiciary and one-time Chief Justice of the Western Region, Nigeria. Jibowu was also a judge of the West African Court of Appeal.

=== William Alfred Allen ===
An Egba man from Iporo Ake and the first Secretary for the EUG. He was the son of Rev. William Allen, CMS missionary and teacher at Ake, Igbein and Igbore in Abeokuta. Rev. William Allen was converted to Christianity after being rescue from the slave ship. Before conversion, he was a devotee of the Orisa Ibeji. Schoolmaster at Regent's Town, Gloucester, Kissey, Pademba Road, Freetown; afterwards Schoolmaster and Assistant Teacher in the Training Institution at Ake, Abeokuta. Ordained a deacon in 1865, 5 February, and in 1871, 27 December became a priest by the Bishop of Sierra Leone. He later became an Anglican pastor at Abeokuta. He laid the foundation and supervised the building of the First St. Paul's Anglican Church, Igbore, Abeokuta. He died at Abeokuta in 1885, 3 April. His son William Alfred Allen was born in Freetown, Sierra Leone, in 1845 and was brought back to Lagos and later Abeokuta by his father at the age of 10 years in December, 1854. He married the daughter of an Egba man, Reverend Andrew Wilhelm, who guided CMS missionary Rev. Henry Townsend from Freetown to Abeokuta in 1843. Rev. Andrew Wilhelm is credited with establishing the first Christian worship site in Abeokuta. It is on this site that the first church, St. Peter's Church Ake, was later built. William Alfred Allen by his EUG appointment became the first Yoruba man in the Colonial era in the space now known as Nigeria to head the administration of an independent, Western styled government, as Secretary to the Government. He played a key role in convincing the Egba rulers in leasing land to the Colonial Government for the establishment of the First railway line from Lagos to Abeokuta. He also signed and translated the leasehold agreement from English to Yoruba for the Egba rulers at the signing of the agreement in the presence of the then Prince Ladapo Ademola. Oba Gbadebo I was the Alake of Egbaland at the signing of the agreement.

=== Adegboyega Edun ===
Adegboyega Edun // (né Jacob Henryson Samuel; 22 July 1860 – c.1925) was an Egba official. He served as the secretary of the Egba United Government, a colonial-era Yoruba political entity. A Saro, Edun was born in Sierra Leone on Sunday, 22 July 1860, to Egba parents. He attended Richmond Theological College, England, and matriculated at the University of London in 1887, where he was placed in the first division. He was a very brilliant scholar, and after graduating he began to function as a pastor and teacher. He was ordained as a minister in the Methodist Church. From 1893 to 1902, he was the principal of the Wesleyan Boy's High School, Lagos. His public service at this time earned him the appreciation of the Governor of Lagos Colony, Sir William Macgregor.

=== Adebesin Folarin ===
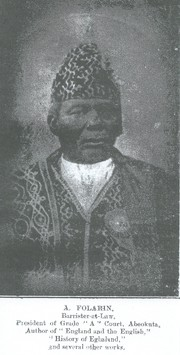
Adebesin Folarin

Chief Adebesin Folarin (also known as Josiah Folarin Williams, Josiah Fitzac Folarin and Debeshin Folarin) (1877 – 4 October 1949) was a Nigerian barrister, judge, public official, historian and author. He was one of the leading intellectuals in early 20th-century Abeokuta, and is recognised as "one of the first truly nationalist historians". In 1914, he was offered and accepted the post of Legal Adviser and Law Officer in the Egba United Government.

=== John Payne Jackson ===
John Payne Jackson (25 March 1848 – 1 August 1915) was an Americo-Liberian journalist, born in Liberia who was influential in Lagos, Nigeria around the turn of the 20th century. He edited and published the Lagos Weekly Record from 1891 until his death. This was a well-written and informative paper that discussed and analysed current events. It took an anti-colonialist, African nationalist position that made it unpopular with the authorities and also with some of the Nigerian elite. He helped ensure that the Triumvirate government in Yorubaland was replaced by the Egba United Government in 1893, and became one of the main advisors of the Alake Gbadebo I.

== Challenges and Decline ==
Despite its achievements, the Egba United Government faced several challenges during its existence. These challenges included internal conflicts and power struggles, external pressures from British colonial authorities, and economic difficulties. Its independence did not last long, as the nature of the government, which placed constraints on the power of the king, was antithetical to Frederick Lugard's vision of "indirect rule." He therefore had it dissolved under the pretext that the king and his chiefs invited the British monarch to serve as their protector in the aftermath of the Adubi War, an Egba revolt against the monarchy and its British overlord. In 1918, the Egba United Government was eventually absorbed into the British colonial administration, marking the end of its existence as a separate entity.

== Achievements and Legacies ==
The EUG played an important role in the history of the Egba Yoruba people and West Africa as a whole. Its legacy can be seen in the modern administrative systems and institutions that were established during its existence. It served to unify the Egba people, helping them achieve a common goal. The government helped to establish a modern system of administration, which included departments such as foreign affairs, justice, finance, public works, and education. The EUG promoted Western education and healthcare in the region, establishing schools and hospitals that served the local population, and developed infrastructure in the region, including roads, bridges, and public buildings.
