= Child sexual abuse in Nigeria =

Child sexual abuse in Nigeria is a criminal offence under several sections of chapter 21 of the country's Criminal Code. The legal age of consent is 18.

A 2015 report by the United Nations Children's Fund (UNICEF) found that one in four girls and one in ten boys in Nigeria had experienced sexual violence before the age of 18. A survey conducted by Positive Action for Treatment Access revealed that over 31.4% of girls reported their first sexual experience was rape or some form of coerced sex.

The Centre for Environment, Human Rights and Development reported that 1,200 cases of rape involving girls were documented in 2012 in Rivers State, located in the southeastern coastal region of Nigeria.

According to UNICEF, six out of ten Nigerian children experience some form of emotional, physical, or sexual abuse before turning 18, with half experiencing physical violence. Cases of abuse have also been reported in religious contexts, including within Protestant denominations and among some Muslim communities practicing polygamy.

== Young girls ==
Conditions that increase the risk of sexual assault on young girls in Nigeria include environments such as schools and baby factories. The practice of child labour also encourages such assault. Studies conducted in Nigeria have shown that young girls constitute the majority of reported sexual assault victims in hospital settings. A four-year review of sexual assault cases at the Lagos State University Teaching Hospital (LASUTH) conducted between 2008 and December 2012, found that out of 287 reported cases, 83% of the victims were under the age of 19. A one-year survey conducted at Enugu State University Teaching Hospital between 2012 and 2013 revealed that 70% of sexual assault victims were under the age of 18. The study also revealed that in the majority of cases, the victims were personally acquainted with the perpetrators. Most of the assaults took place in uncompleted buildings or at the residences of either the victim or the perpetrator.

=== Child labour ===
One of the traditional means of socialization for children is through trading. However, the involvement of young girls in street trading has been identified as a factor that increases their vulnerability to sexual harassment. Studies have linked the sexual abuse of young girls in Nigeria to the broader issue of child labour.

=== Baby factories ===
Religious and communal stigma surrounding surrogacy and adoption has contributed to the emergence and proliferation of so-called baby factories in Nigeria. Many of the female victims in these facilities are adolescents. While a majority of girls in these settings are pregnant upon arrival, reports also indicate that some are abducted or trafficked into the facilities. In some instances, girls are subjected to sexual abuse with the sole intent of procreation.

=== Poor parenting ===
Poverty and lack of access to financial resources have been identified as contributing factors to child sexual abuse in Nigeria. When parents are unable to adequately provide for or supervise their children, it increases the risk of exploitation and abuse.

== See also ==
- Child marriage in Nigeria
- Ages of consent in Africa
- Paternity fraud in Nigeria
- Crime in Nigeria
- Child labour in Nigeria
- Girl child labour in Nigeria
- Female genital mutilation in Nigeria
- Baba Ijesha child sexual assault case

== Sources ==
- Ebigbo, P (2003). "Child Abuse in Africa: Nigeria as focus". International Journal of Early Childhood. 35 (1–2): 95–113. doi:10.1007/BF03174436. S2CID 140359838.
