= Women in Nigeria =

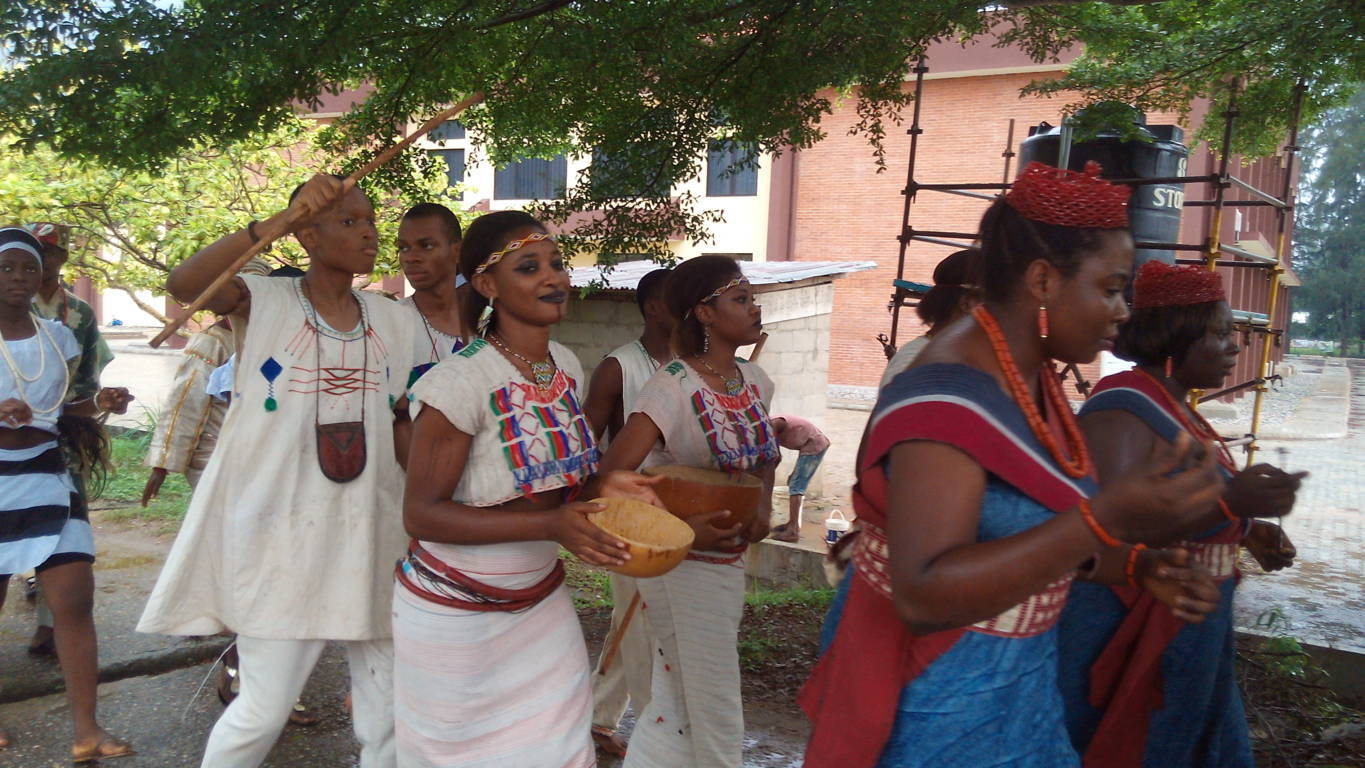
- Nigerian women

General statistics
- Maternal mortality (per 100,000): 630 (2010)
- Women in parliament: 6.7% (2012)
- Women over 25 with secondary education: NA
- Women in labour force: 50% (2017)

Gender Inequality Index
- Value: 0.680(2021)
- Rank: 168th out of 191

Global Gender Gap Index
- Value: 0.639 (2022)
- Rank: 123rd out of 146

Women in Nigeria are a diverse group of individuals who have a wide range of experiences and backgrounds. Women in Nigeria face numerous challenges, including gender inequality, poverty, violence, lack of access to education and healthcare, and lack of participation in government and economics. Despite these challenges, Nigerian women are making strides in all areas of life and are becoming increasingly empowered to take control of their lives and their futures.

Additionally, traditional gender roles and cultural norms continue to limit the potential of women in Nigeria. The social role of women in Nigeria varies according to religious, cultural, and geographic factors. However, many Nigerian cultures see women solely as mothers, sisters, daughters, and wives. For instance, women in Northern Nigeria are more likely to be secluded in the home than women in Southern Nigeria, who tend to participate more in public life.

Modern challenges for the women of Nigeria include child marriage, female genital mutilation, rape, and domestic violence.

Nigeria ranked 124th out of 148 countries in the 2025 Gender Inequality Index.

== Social issues ==
=== Child marriage ===
Child marriage is quite common in Nigeria, with about 43% of girls getting married before the age of 18 years, and 17% before they turn 15. The prevalence, however, varies greatly by region. Nigeria's total fertility rate is 5.07 children/woman. Nigeria's high fertility rate is associated with socio-economic problems and under-development.

=== Domestic violence ===
Domestic violence is prominent in Nigeria as in other parts of Africa. There is a deep cultural belief in Nigeria that it is socially acceptable to hit a woman as a disciplinary measure. Cases of domestic violence remain high and show no signs of reduction in Nigeria, regardless of age, tribe, religion, or even social status. The CLEEN Foundation reports that 1 in every 3 respondents identified as a victim of domestic violence. The survey also found a nationwide increase in domestic violence in the past 3 years from 21% in 2011 to 30% in 2013. A CLEEN Foundation's 2012 National Crime and Safety Survey demonstrated that 31% of the national sample confessed to being victims of domestic violence.

Domestic violence takes many forms including physical, sexual, emotional, and mental. Traditionally, domestic violence is committed against females. Common forms of violence against women in Nigeria are rape, acid attacks, molestation, wife beating, and corporal punishment.

The Nigerian government has taken legal proceedings to prosecute men who abuse women in several states. There is currently a push in Nigeria for federal laws concerning domestic violence and for a stronger national response and support for domestic violence issues.

Incidents of domestic violence in Nigeria include battery, beatings, torture, acid baths, rape, and consequently, death. It is, however, estimated that approximately one in every three women suffers domestic violence and Intimate Partner Violence from the hands of those who claim to love and supposedly, protect them. The menace is eating deep as most of the victims do not speak out about violations of their rights, a result of nonchalance, insensitivity, and negative response from their immediate family and society at large.

On the 27th of February, 2021, The Guardian, Nigeria, recorded in their Saturday edition that cases of domestic violence, especially the physical aspect of it, remain high. They reported that at least once a week, there's a case of a man beating, maiming or killing his wife, and in some very rare cases, a woman dealing with her husband in the same manner.

=== Prostitution and sex trafficking ===
A few causes of prostitution in Nigeria have been attributed by scholars. They have especially credited poverty and unemployment among women, government corruption, international sex tourism, and gender inequality. Many Nigerian women are trafficked in prostitution both in the country and internationally. This is often done as a form of debt bondage or under threat of violence. Official statistics in 2001 found that 45,000 Nigerian women were trafficked internationally.

=== Female child labour ===
Female child labour in Nigeria refers to the high incidence in Nigeria of girls aged 5–14 who are involved in economic activities outside education and leisure. The prevalence of female child labour in Nigeria is largely due to household economic status, but other factors include the educational status of parents, the presence of peer pressure, and high societal demand for domestic help and sex workers. Additionally, in many rural and Muslim communities in Northern Nigeria, children are sometimes asked to aid religiously secluded women or mothers in running errands.

Many girls in the nation work as shop helpers and street hawkers. The use of young girls in economic activities exposes them to dangers that sometimes result in sexual assault, loneliness, anger, and exploitation. In addition, the labour of young girls is not legally recognized and any employee benefit are negligible.

In Nigeria, child labour is driven by social, demographic, and economic factors such as poverty, loss of parental employment, loss of a parent or family guardian, rural-urban migration, large family size, and cultural norms such as polygamy. Other drivers include the mal-distribution of schools, poor accessibility, and the high cost of tuition. Recently, conflicts and terrorism have caused internal displacement of people and damage to school infrastructure, pushing more children into child labour. Moreover, the mass killings of communities by bandits in northern Nigeria have created more orphans and potential victims of child labour.

=== Polygamy ===
12 out of the 36 Nigerian states recognize polygamous marriages as being equivalent to monogamous marriages. All twelve states are governed by Islamic Sharia Law. The States, which are all northern, include the states of Bauchi, Borno, Gombe, Jigawa, Kaduna, Kano, Katsina, Kebbi, Niger, Sokoto, Yobe, and Zamfara which allows for a man to take more than one wife.

Elsewhere, both Christians and traditionalists in polygamous unions are recognized by customary law. These unions are contingent upon the absence of prior civil marriage, as bigamy technically applies, but even when present, men are seldom ever prosecuted for bigamy in Nigeria.

Polygamy is legal in Nigeria, and is practiced by many of the country's ethnic groups. It is estimated that about one-third of Nigerian marriages are polygamous. Polygamy is most common among the Hausa, Fulani, and Yoruba peoples. The practice is also found among the Igbo, Kanuri, and Tiv peoples, and is considered as a way to provide economic security.

In Nigeria, polygamy is regulated by customary law. This means that each ethnic group has its own rules and regulations regarding the practice. Generally, a man must obtain permission from his first wife before taking another wife. He must also be able to provide for all of his wives and children financially.

== Women's health ==
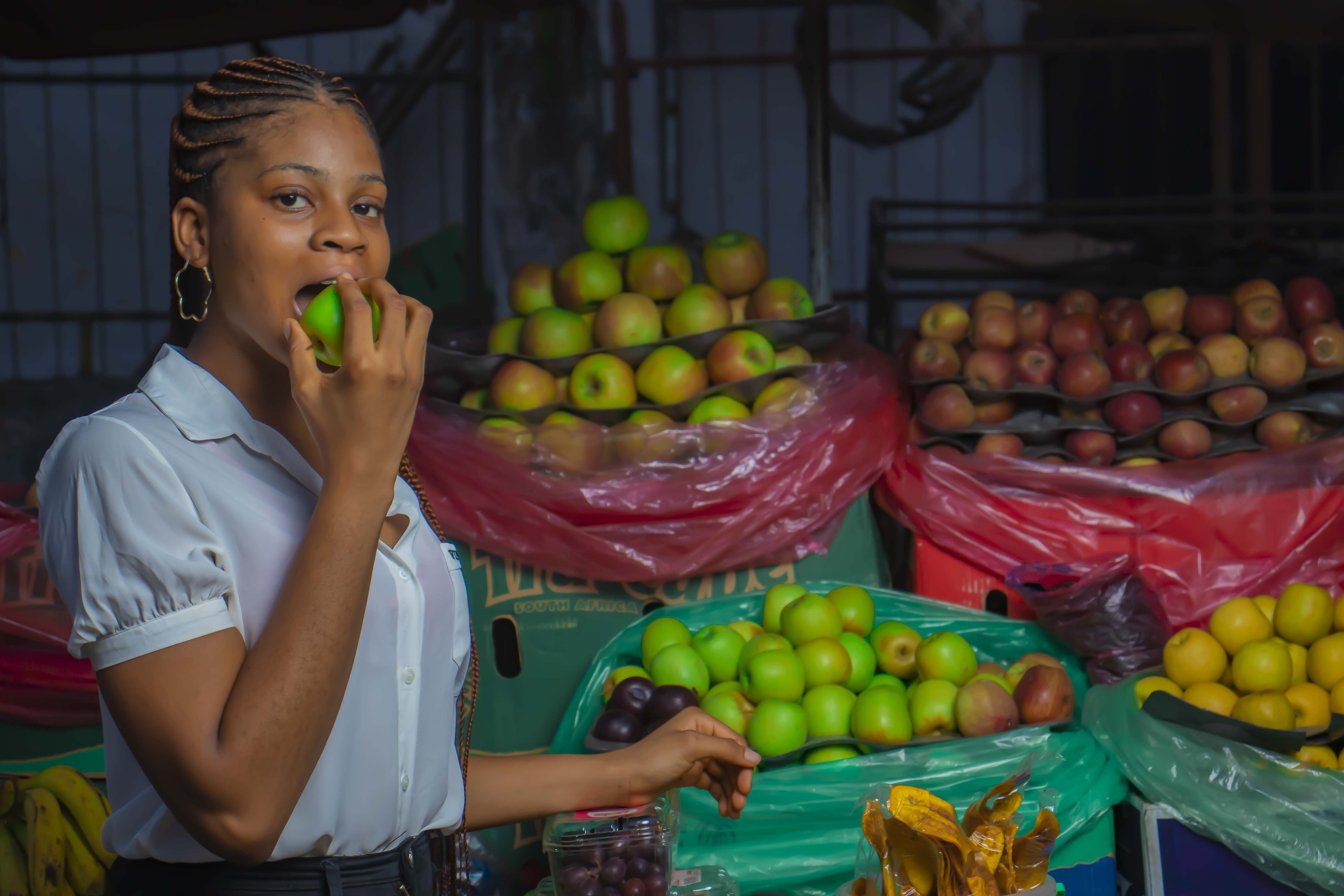
Woman at fruit stand in Nigeria, 2021

Nigerian women and girls face inequality in services in Nigeria's healthcare system. One reason for this is the prevalence of patriarchal norms that give men jurisdiction over women's medical decisions. This is exacerbated by poverty, lack of education, and the resources required in order to visit medical facilities. The issue of transport is a serious one as it hinders women from accessing healthcare services. The Nigeria Demographic and Health Survey conducted in 2018 reveals that nearly 52% of Nigerian women experience at least one issue when trying to seek healthcare services, with financial insecurity being the biggest hindrance.

=== Reproductive health ===
Nigerian law only allows for abortion in cases where pregnancy poses a threat to the mother's life. Nonetheless, an estimated 1.8 to 2.7 million women terminate their pregnancies each year. This is because many women resort to receiving abortions in illegal and unsafe conditions which usually result in diseases and even death. Approximately 25% of the Nigerian women who terminate their pregnancies find themselves with severe health problems. Existing research further supposes that up to 6,000 Nigerian women die from induced abortions each year. Additionally, Nigeria has the highest rate of maternal mortality out of all African nations and the fourth highest globally, with 576 mothers dying per 100,000 births.

Marriage and pregnancy occur at an early age for Nigerian women especially in the northern region of Nigeria, among Hausa communities. The north has a maternal mortality rate of 21 maternal deaths per 1000 pregnancies, which is higher in comparison to the country's overall maternal mortality rate. Girls in Hausa communities may get married at the age of 11 and begin to have children a few years later which results in them developing health problems. Research reveals that if these girls engaged in sexual intercourse and childbearing at a later stage of life, then the high rates of carcinoma of the cervix found among Hausa women would be brought down dramatically. Moreover, there are instances in which these pregnant girls are not physically large enough to give birth vaginally and this leads to cases of obstructed labor, which can have detrimental effects for the mother and the child if surgery is not performed. Women's mobility outside the home is restricted with men often in charge of escorting them. Men often make medical decisions for their wives and women give birth at home with the help of a traditional birth attendant. Furthermore, Hausa women are subject to local and state rules that require them to seek permission from their husbands or bring their husbands along with them when going to acquire contraception.

Female genital cutting (also known as female genital mutilation) in Nigeria accounts for a significant portion of female genital cutting/mutilation (FGM/C) cases, worldwide. The practice is considered harmful to girls and women and a violation of human rights. FGM causes infertility, maternal death, infections, and the loss of sexual pleasure. Gishiri cuts, hymenectomy, and female circumcision are all practiced in Nigeria. Nationally, 27% of Nigerian women between the ages of 15 and 49 were victims of FGM, as of 2012. In the last 30 years, prevalence of the practice has decreased by half in some parts of Nigeria. From 2012 to 2018 there was a 7% decrease in the proportion of women who experienced FGM. Although this is a practice prevalent throughout Nigeria, it is more concentrated in the South East and West of Nigeria and more prevalent in Yoruba communities.

== Women and politics ==
=== Participation in politics ===
==== Pre-colonial era ====
Prior to colonization, Nigerian women were involved in political process. In the Bornu Empire, women took part in administering the state. Queen Bakwa Turuku founded the city of Zaria and her daughter built a defensive wall around the city in order to repel invasions. Ancient Yorubaland comprised eight high ranking chieftains who helped the ruler rule the kingdom.

The Igbo women of Nigeria were politically active in their communities during this period. One political system that was prevalent here was the dual-sex system. In this system, women's organizations and men's organizations acted side by side. Some examples of these women-led organizations were secret societies and courts for women. Authority was shared between the two genders as a way of promoting unity. A prominent position enjoyed by Igbo women under this system was that of the Omu, which translates to "mother of the society". Those that attained this position did so independently of their male relatives. The Omu made decisions that pertained to both men and women. She was in charge of overseeing and regulating the marketplace by settling market prices and disputes. The Omu was also the head of the council that was in charge of local trade. Both she and other women were obligated to attend assemblies to discuss important matters pertaining to the people. They had discretion in important matters, such as waging war.

Another political system that existed among the Igbo was the corporate political system, which was characterized by relationships and was male-dominated. Igbo women's positions of power within this system was dependent on the status of their male family members. Nonetheless, these women still held influential roles. For instance, the oldest daughter, known as the Isa Ada, was seen as the leader of women and the mother of the lineage. In some areas, she played a direct role in decision-making processes.

Other organizations also held influence within communities during this time. Some of these organizations were "society of daughters of the lineage", "association of lineage wives", and the "women's assembly". Their purpose was to police women and ensure they were in compliance with societal customs. Some of the responsibilities the society of daughters of the lineage had included were mediation and serving as the supreme court of appeal for all issues pertaining to women. On the other hand, the association of lineage wives acted as a lower court.

==== Colonial Nigeria ====
Christian missionaries sought to replace Igbo religious and cultural practices which eventually hurt Nigerian women. The British did not give Igbo women any political legitimacy as they only ruled through and dealt with male authorities, hindering women's presence in politics.

The Native Ordinances Act of 1901 deemed only the Native Courts, which were established by the British, to be legitimate courts, diminishing the political system of pre-colonial Nigeria. Furthermore, under this British administration, Nigerian boys were taught skills that would allow them to manage industries and work in the courts. They were also given access to Western education whereas the girls were confined to areas of study that the British thought were suited for women. However, Nigerian women were still politically active during this period and rose against the British. Some key occurrences are the Women's War of 1929, the 1929 Water Rate Demonstrations, and the Nwaobiala Movement in 1925. Despite this frustration, women still participated in this new political process even though the opportunities were very limited due to the beliefs of the British. Madam Okwei was the first Igbo woman that participated in the new political system as she held a position within a Native Court.

Nigerian women were also politically active when it came to decolonization efforts in the 1940s and 50s. Women's organizations were the channels through which women organized and mobilized against colonization. Some key organizations during this time period were the Nigerian Women's Union and the National Council of Women's Societies. Women such as Onokoro Nwoti were also involved in the NCNC as well. There were also women's wings of parties created by women that allowed for their voices to be heard. This is also when Southern Nigerian women had acquired the right to vote. The Igbo women garnered support from women for the National Council of Nigeria and Citizens, which would rule Nigeria at independence.

Women were elected as "special members" of the Nigerian Western assembly during the country's early years of pushing towards a federal system. The electoral system was made up of three colleges, the first being Villages, second the Intermediary Electoral College of Districts, and finally the College of the Divisions. Deputies were elected at the first two levels by taxpaying male and female voters. The highest electoral college was elected through a secret ballot. The voting system of elections provided a prime opportunity for clientelism to come into play. Women could not rise higher than the first electoral college because they did not have support from traditionally minded men and not all voting women had the means to support them through the taxpaying suffrage system thus the whole system privileged men aiming higher. Because of the near impossibility of women gaining representation in government, the men of the 1950s requested for women to have one of the three seats reserved for special members (being underrepresented communities). Activist Elizabeth Adekogbe argued that this seat was not so much of a step forward as it appeared to be. Rather than giving women a real voice in government it gave men the opportunity to choose a woman who aligned with their beliefs and use her as a guise for reform. She critiqued the fact that women would be viewed as a separate minority group rather than full members of society. In 1953, this position was filled by Mrs. Remilekun Iseoluwa Aiyedun, a member of the Protestant church who in-fact criticized this appointment claiming that a women's responsibility remained in the household rather than in political activity.

==== Post-colonial Nigeria ====
Since independence in 1960, women in Nigeria have been able to come together in feminist movements, such as the Women in Nigeria organization founded in 1982, to combat male supremacy in Nigeria and shape feminism as a force for Nigerian women. The 1950s presented many debates regarding women's access to political responsibilities and their stance on voting rights in Nigeria. It was not until 1979 when all Nigerian women gained their voting rights. To this day, Nigerian women still rally and fight to further their political voice and representation.

In the World's Economic Forum's Global Gender Gap report for 2018, Nigeria was ranked 139th out of a total 149 countries, in terms of gender gap in 'political empowerment'. As of 2019, out of 193 countries globally, Nigeria is at the 181st position when it comes to women's descriptive representation in parliament. During 2015 Nigerian elections, Nigeria had 20 women out of 359 in its Lower House (5.6%) and 7 out of 109 in Upper House (6.4%). As of the most recent elections, 7.3% of the Nigerian Senate and 3.1% of the House of Representatives are women. There are no state governors that are women.

There are no laws implemented to improve the gender gap. In 2014, the Women Advocates Research and Documentation Centre (WARDC) and the Nigerian Women Trust Fund (NWTF) outlined "Nigerian Women Charter of Demand" that demanded to have 35% of women incorporated in all sectors of government. The barriers to participation in politics include election time violence, economic restrictions, and patriarchy, according to the Head of the Gender Division for the Independent National Electoral Commission. Political parties have excluded women, and do little to encourage the participation. During the 2018 primaries, there were incidents in which women were harassed and even made to give up their party ticket.

To help increase the number of women working in the government, The Nigerian Women's Trust Fund (NWTF) uses funding, networking opportunities, mentoring, training for leadership, and advocacy. It is supported by the Ministry of Women Affairs and Social Development (MWASD), UN Women.

As of 2006, Nigeria's National Gender Policy has called for the increase of women in government positions to 35%. However, these provisions have yet to materialize as the proportion of women in parliament is much less than that figure.

==== Family rights and inheritance ====
Women in Nigeria have limited rights concerning children and property. In Islam women can only inherit half of what men can inherit and in many areas of the country women are not allowed to inherit land or property, increasing dependency on men. Many women have no control over the income produced by their labor.

==== Timeline of significant events ====
Time Line	Significant Events
1960-1966: The First Republic	Nigeria Gained Independence in 1960, a time when only four women served in political positions throughout the whole country; This was an increase in positions, however, compared to male representation a low one; 1960: Wuraola Esan becomes the first female in federal Parliament; Women were still largely left out of government happenings
1979-1983: The Second Republic	Participation of women in politics increases; a few women are elected into the House of Representatives and the state houses of Assembly; Yet, only two women were Federal Ministers: Chief Janet Akinrinade and Mrs. Ebun Oyagbola; First Nigerian Women appointed to senate: Ms. Franca Afegbua
Military Rule in 1983	The Buhari led a military ruled period (1983 Nigerian coup d'état); First formal quota system introduced by Federal Government directing that at least one woman was required to be appointed as a member of the Executive council in each state: all the states complied; Early 1990s: Alhaja Latifat Okunuu of Lagos State and Mrs. Pamela Sadauki of Kaduna State appointed as Deputy Governors; Still no female minister or member of the defunct Supreme Military council or Armed Forces Ruling council
1992-1993: The Third Republic	Senatorial Elections held in 1992: Mrs. Kofoworola Bucknor was the only woman to win a seat in the senate; Very few women won seats in the House of Representatives; In 1993, President Ibrahim Babangida appointed two female ministers: Mrs. Emily Aiklmhokeude and Mrs. Laraba Dagash; The General Sani Abacha administration had a number of female ministers in the cabinet as well
1993–present	Female representation has remained low; The 2021 Global Gender Gap report ranked Nigeria 139th of 156th countries with the largest gender gaps; In the 2019 election, 47.14% of registered voters were women and only 13% of candidates were women; Women who want to participate in politics still face a backlash from Nigerian men in the form of gender stereotypes assigning leadership to men, unpaid labour (housework/childcare) and sexual assault all of which place them at a disadvantage

=== Women's advocacy ===
A national feminist movement was inaugurated in 1982, and a national conference held at Ahmadu Bello University. Women in Nigeria evolved out of a study group of university sociology and political science lecturers at ABU. WIN has committed resource towards studies and publications and on gender issues. WIN launched the Nigerian Feminist Forum (NFF) in 2008. NFF and WIN have had success in blocking the passing of laws prohibiting condoms, institutionalizing dress codes, and even a private university's request for girls to prove their virginity prior to study. They hold press conferences and mobilize Nigerian women to rally against the passing of these proposed bills.

As an example, a feminist meeting in Ibadan came out against polygamy and was then soundly criticized by market women, who said they supported the practice because it allowed them to pursue their trading activities and have the household looked after at the same time. Research in the north has indicated that many women opposed the practice, and tried to keep bearing children to stave off a second wife's entry into the household. Although women's status would undoubtedly rise, for the foreseeable future Nigerian women lacked the opportunities of men.

Yinka Jegede-Ekpe, a Nigerian HIV/AIDS activist and HIV-positive individual, established the Nigerian Community of Women Living With HIV/AIDS in 2001. The group intended to inform women about the risks of HIV/AIDS and to empower them to speak out.

Another recently formed group of this kind is the Feminist Coalition, established in July 2020. Yet another group, The ElectHer organization, was established to address the under representation of women in elections across Africa. Their goal is to achieve 50% representation in government by women across Africa by 2050.

=== Nigerian women in contemporary politics ===
==== Nigerian women rally against rejection of pro-equality bills ====
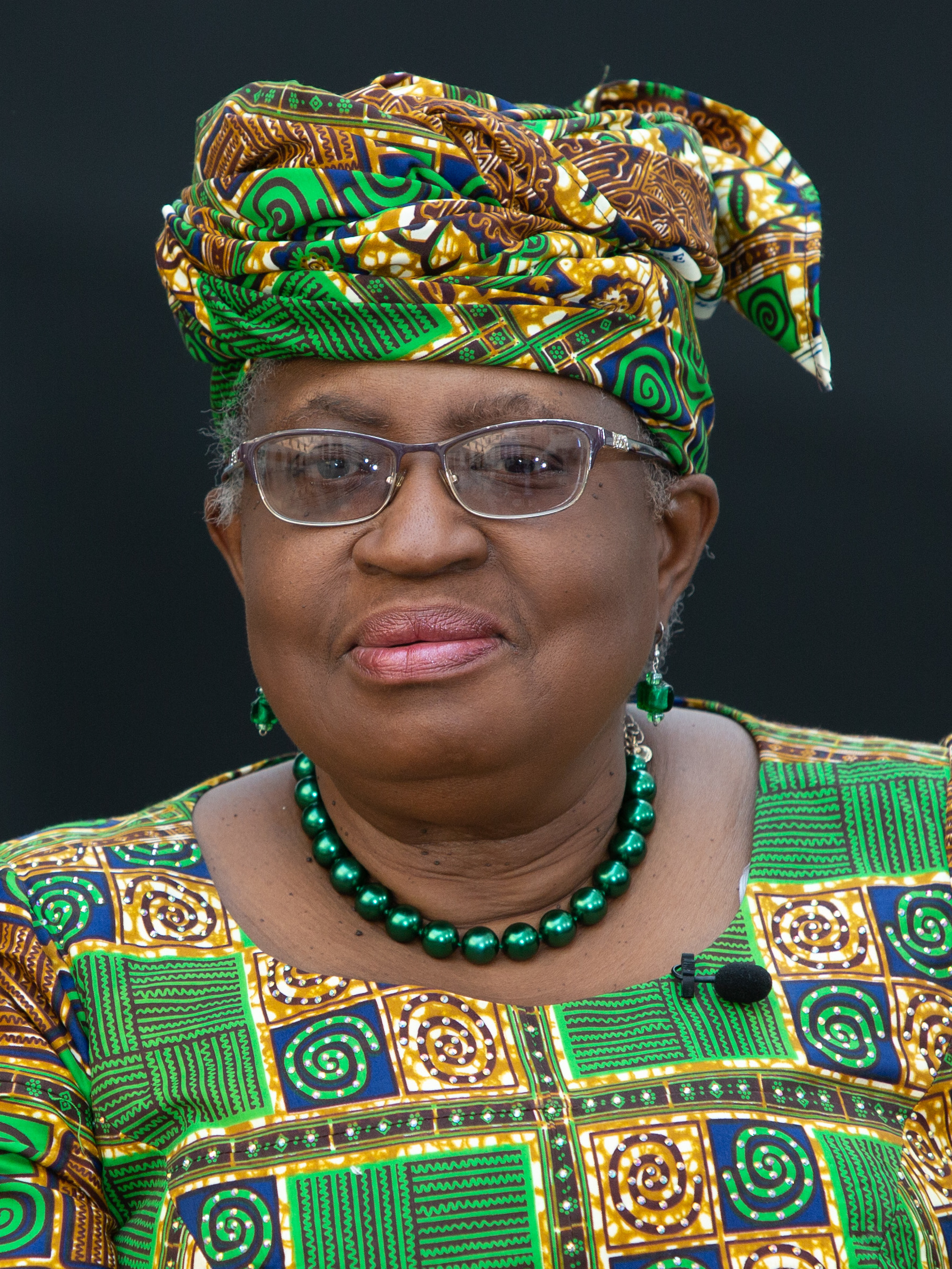
Ngozi Okonjo-Iweala, First Female Nigerian Minister of Finance, current Director-General of the World Trade Organization

In 2022, the Nigerian parliament voted against several gender bills that would have amended the 1999 constitution. If passed, these bills would have allowed foreign-born husbands of Nigerian women to gain citizenship, and given women the right to become indigenes of their husband's state after five years of marriage. Wives of Nigerian men are already granted citizenship upon marriage. There was also discussion of allotting 35% of the legislative seats to women, and reserving 35% of political party leadership for women. Women protested the result of these decisions.

==== Women in the informal economy ====
Agriculture plays a major role in Nigeria's economy, contributing a quarter of the gross domestic product. The Nigerian government has promised to allocate 10% of the annual budget to agriculture but have not followed through. Women smallholder farmers are especially overlooked though they make up 70% of the work force and produce 60% of the food Nigerians depend on. These women play important roles in averting major threats such as resource conservation and food scarcity, while maintaining a healthy and functional ecosystem. They suffer from poor living conditions and have little say in development initiatives. One modern example of success, however, can be found in the Smallholder Women Farmers Organization in Nigeria. With the help of the International Budget Partnership, an organization working to promote inclusive sustainable development that promotes equity, justice, and data driven advocacy, these women succeed securing an 18.5% increase to the national government's spending on agriculture. As a result, 111,000 smallholder women farmers were given new or improved seeds and fertilizer to grow crops, more modern equipment to increase production.

== Education ==
=== Women's education ===
Women and girls in Nigeria have a basic human right to education; this right has been recognized since the 1948 adoption of the Universal Declaration on Human Rights (UDHR)

To ensure equal access to education, the National Policy on Education states that access to education is a right for all Nigerian children regardless of gender, religion and disability.

=== Factors promoting gender inequality in the educational system ===
Despite the relevance of equal educational opportunity in a developing country in Nigeria, Tahir (1991) maintained that: although women constitute about 55% of the Nigerian population, their level of participation in educational programmes of the nation is not proportionate to their number." Female literacy as well should be made to increase from the stagnant 52% to 80% in the rise of the technological age.

1. Early Marriage - Median Age of marriage is 18 while men is 27, so when girls are married at the ages of 10–14 years, their educational careers are disrupted, especially if there is no provision for a second chance of a learning opportunity.
2. Girls Hawking Practices - A common practice in Northern Nigeria and indeed in all traditional and urban settlements, to find girl-child hawking wares throughout the day. It is an economic practice carried out mainly at the instance of parents and guardians. The reason for this is to generate additional income for families. While this goes one, and when it is mainly restricted to the girl-child, a situation is created in which such girls miss the opportunity of a formal education, since education like economic activities is time specific. It is for this reason that this practice is considered to be discriminatory against girl children.
3. Poor Parental Support for Women - This has to do with when parents are faced with the choice of sending a girl or boy to school. Most cases, boys will be preferred to girls. Apart from this, some parents are always apprehensive towards formal education for their girl. To such parents, formal education is capable of instilling strange attitudes, values, norms, and beliefs that could make the girl non-compliant in their characteristic disposition in society.
4. Poverty- Inability to pay their school fees, buy uniforms, textbooks, and notebooks which are all extremely financially demanding and another salient factor preventing parents from sending their girls to school.

== Regional differences ==
=== Northern Nigeria ===
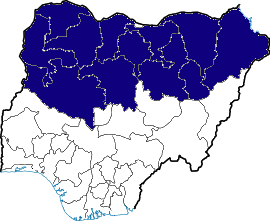
The 12 Muslim majority states in Nigeria's north where polygamy is legal.

Northern women in Nigeria face a variety of challenges, including limited access to education, health care, and economic opportunities. They are also subject to gender-based violence, including early and forced marriage, female genital mutilation, and honor killings. In addition, they are often excluded from decision-making processes and lack representation in government. Despite these challenges, northern women are increasingly advocating for their rights and working to improve their lives and the lives of their communities.

In the north, practices that were introduced in terms of women's position in society have been mainly as a result of colonialism and the introduction of Salafism and Wahhabism thought into the traditionally sufist region. This process has yielded, generally, less formal education; early teenage marriages, especially in rural areas; and confinement to the household, which was often polygamous, except for visits to family, ceremonies, and the workplace, if employment were available and permitted by a girl's family or husband. For the most part, Hausa women did not work in the fields, whereas Kanuri women did; both helped with harvesting and were responsible for all household food processing.

Urban women sold cooked foods, usually by sending young girls out onto the streets or operating small stands. Research indicated that this practice was one of the main reasons city women gave for opposing schooling for their daughters. Even in elite houses with educated wives, women's presence at social gatherings was either nonexistent or very restricted. In the modern sector, a few women were appearing at all levels in offices, banks, social services, nursing, radio, television, and the professions (teaching, engineering, environmental design, law, pharmacy, medicine, and even agriculture and veterinary medicine).

This trend resulted from women's secondary schools, teachers' colleges, and in the 1980s women holding approximately one-fifth of university places—double the proportion of the 1970s. Research in the 1980s indicated that, for the Muslim north, education beyond primary school was restricted to the daughters of the business and professional elites, and in almost all cases, courses and professions were chosen by the family, not the woman themselves.

However, in recent years, the rate of women's employment has apparently increased as more women have been employed in the modern sector. They are increasingly employed in high-paying and valuable jobs. However, men still generally have more opportunities than women, with leadership being nearly exclusively men, and women being disproportionately overrepresented in Nigeria's large informal economy. In addition, younger generations of women increasingly have autonomy in choosing their jobs. However, the north still lags behind in these apparent changes due to cultural laws.

=== Southern Nigeria ===
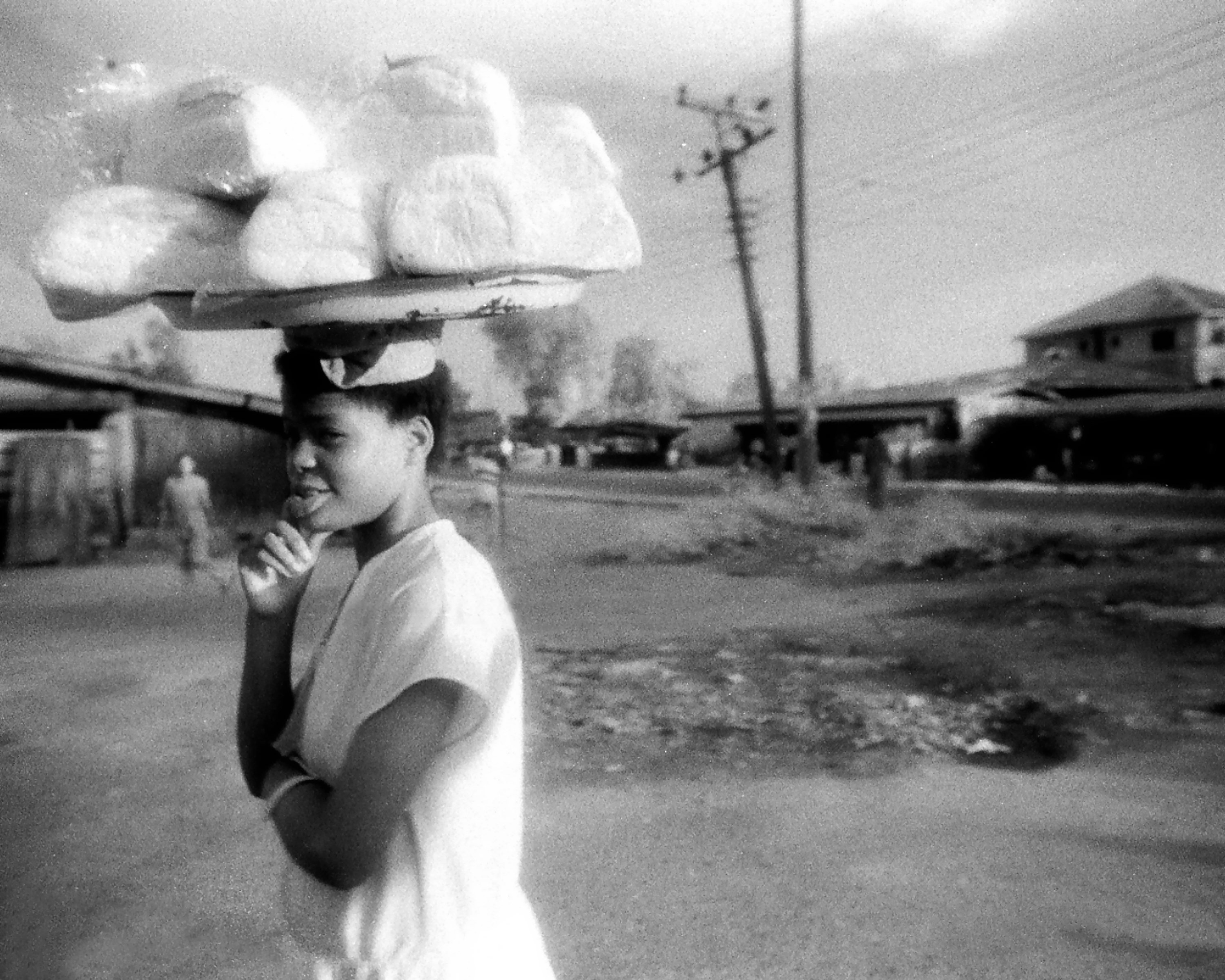
A Nigerian woman balancing market goods on her head

In the south, women traditionally had economically important positions in interregional trade and the markets, worked on farms as major labour sources, and had influential positions in traditional systems of local organization. The south, like the north, had been polygynous; in 1990 it still was for many households, including those professing Christianity.

Women in the south, had received Western-style education since the nineteenth century, so they occupied positions in the professions and to some extent in politics. In addition, women headed households, something not seriously considered in Nigeria's development plans. Such households were more numerous in the south, but they were on the rise everywhere.

== Recognition by authorities ==
Generally, in Nigeria, development planning refers to "adult males," "households," or "families". Women were included in such units but not as a separate category. Up until the 1980s, the term "farmer" was assumed to be exclusively male, even though in some areas of the nation women did most of the farm work. In Nigerian terms, a woman was almost always defined as someone's daughter, wife, mother, or widow.

Single women were suspect, although they constituted a large category, especially in the cities, because of the high divorce rate. Traditionally, and to some extent this remained true in popular culture, single adult women were seen as available sexual partners should they try for some independence and as easy victims for economic exploitation. In Kaduna State, for example, investigations into illegal land expropriations noted that women's farms were confiscated almost unthinkingly by local chiefs wishing to sell to urban-based speculators and would-be commercial farmers.

== Notable figures ==
=== Politics ===
- Amina J. Mohammed — Deputy Secretary-General of the U.N.
- Gbemisola Ruqayyah Saraki — Politician and philanthropist.
- Florence Ita Giwa — Politician.
- Ngozi Okonjo-Iweala — Economist, First Female Minister of Finance, Director-General of the World Trade Organization
- Aisha Yesufu, activist
- Funmilayo Ransome-Kuti, activist
- Dora Akunyili — Former Minister of Information and Communication, Former Director General, National Agency for Food and Drug Administration and Control (NAFDAC) of Nigeria.
- Kemi Adeosun — Minister of Finance (November 2015 – 2018)
- Beni Lar, Member of Nigeria's House of Representatives and women's advocate
- Esther Kiobel, human rights activist

=== Business ===
- Bilikiss Adebiyi Abiola — Wecyclers CEO
- Folorunsho Alakija, Businesswoman
- Hajia Bola Shagaya - Businesswoman and Fashion Enthusiast
- Sola David-Borha, Chief Executive (Africa Region) of Standard Bank

=== Entertainment ===
- Agbani Darego — Model and Beauty Queen
- Chimamanda Ngozi Adichie — Writer
- Chioma Akpotha — Actress & Film Maker
- Folake Coker — Fashion Designer, Creative Director of Tiffany Amber
- Funke Akindele — Actress
- Genevieve Nnaji — Actress
- Helen Paul — Comedian
- Ireti Doyle — Actress
- Kiki Mordi – Media personality and journalist
- Aisha Salaudeen — Multimedia journalist
- Mercy Chinwo - Singer, Songwriter & Actress
- Onyinye Ough, author and activist
- Osonye Tess Onwueme — Playwright
- Mo Abudu, media personality
- Tiwa Savage - Entertainer
- Ufuoma McDermott — Actress & Film Maker
- Yemi Alade - Entertainer

=== Authors and writers ===
- Catherine Obianuju Acholonu
- Chimamanda Ngozi Adichie
- Onyinye Ough, author and activist
- Buchi Emecheta - Author

=== Science ===
Notable scientists include:

- Ameyo Adadevoh - Nigerian physician
- Professor Grace Alele-Williams - Mathematician
- Francisca Nneka Okeke - Physicist
- Deborah Ajakaiye - Geophysicists
- Olabisi Ugbebor - Mathematician
- Adenike Osofisan - Computer Scientist
- Folasade Ogunsola - Medical Scientist
- Chinedum Peace Babalola - Pharmacist
- Lucy Jumeyi Ogbadu - Microbiologist
- Eucharia Oluchi Nwaichi, Ph.D. - Environmental Biochemist
- Stella Ifeanyi Smith, Ph.D. - Microbiologist

== See also ==
- Women in Africa
