= Ayesha Imam =

Nigerian human rights activist

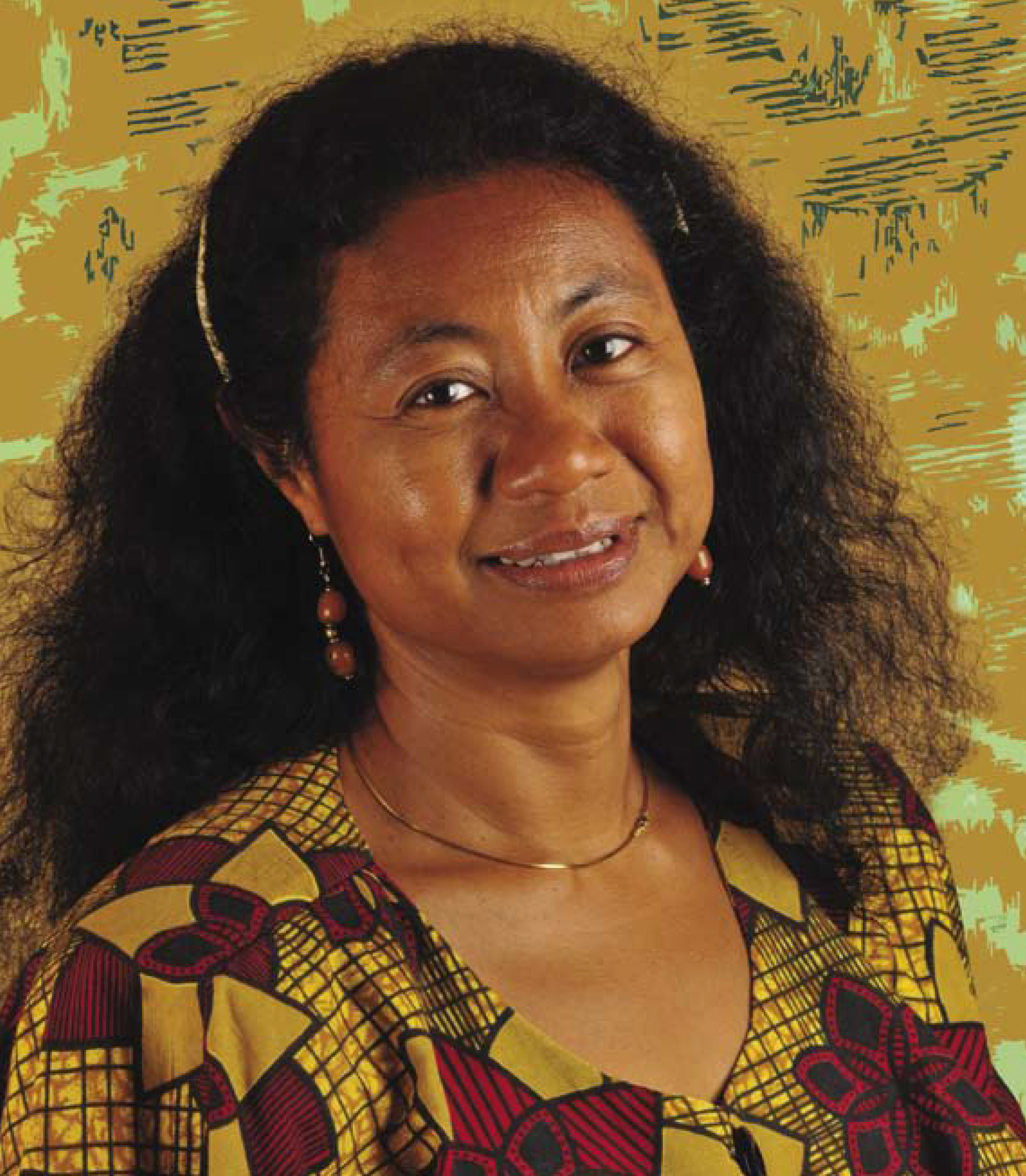
- Education: Polytechnic of North London; Ahmadu Bello University; University of Sussex
- Occupation: Human rights activist
- Years active: 2017–2023
- Notable work: former Chief of the Culture, Gender and Human Rights department of the United Nations Population Fund; founding member and pioneer national coordinating secretary of Women in Nigeria.

Ayesha Imam is a Nigerian born human rights activist. She is a former Chief of the Culture, Gender and Human Rights department of the United Nations Population Fund and a founding member and pioneer national coordinating secretary of Women in Nigeria. She later became the coordinator of a BAOBAB for Women's Human Rights, a human rights advocacy group. From April 2017 to March 2023, she served as Chair of the Board of Directors of Greenpeace International.

Imam was involved in the successful appeal to overturn Amina Lawal's death conviction.

== Life ==
Imam earned a sociology bachelor's degree from Polytechnic of North London in 1980 and a master's from Ahmadu Bello University (ABU) in 1983. She completed her doctorate at University of Sussex. She joined the Ahmadu Bello University Zaria in 1980. In 1983, she was the coordinating secretary, the highest official position of Women in Nigeria, a feminist organization based in Zaria. In 1996, she co-founded BAOBAB, a women's human rights group that provides legal protection for women who are charged under codified Sharia penal codes, customary or secular laws that involves women but were established without the consideration of the interests of women. Such codes deals with flogging or stoning of women. BAOBAB's mission is to increase progressive interpretations of Islamic texts and raise awareness to Nigerian women's rights. As director of BAOBAB during the introduction of Sharia, the organization held seminars across the country to discuss how Muslim laws can be interpreted to support women's rights.

In 2002, she was awarded the John Humphrey Freedom Award. Imam is a member of African Feminist Forum.

In a 2003 interview, Imam notes that not all laws connected to Shariah are from Qur’anic verses, but some are male interpretations of divine revelations years after the Quran was published, such interpretations include the stoning to death of a woman for adultery and amputation for theft. Therefore, she believes not all laws of the Sharia criminal code in Nigeria, especially those concerning some aspects of zina and the control of sexuality, are immutable.

In 2004, Imam wrote a keynote address titled "Women, Muslim Laws and Human Rights in Nigeria". This publication was written in an African Program occasional paper series by the Woodrow Wilson International Center. In September 2003, they co-sponsored a forum on Women, Islam and Human Rights in Africa. Imam presented the notable keynote address was in the form of remarks or responses to inquiries. The Woodrow Wilson International Center, and forum organizer, stated that her remarks deserved a wider address and were the second addition to their WWICS African Program Occasional Papers.

== Key Contributions ==
- Founder of Women in Nigeria: Ayesha Imam established Nigeria's first feminist organization in 1982
- Co- Founder Of Women Living Under Muslim Laws (WLUML): Involved in the international network supporting women under Muslim laws.
- Founding Director (and former executive director) of BAOBAB: Led an organization for women's human rights in Nigeria receiving the John Humphrey Freedom Award in 2002 established in 1996.

== International Roles ==
- Board Member of the International Council on Human Rights Policy.
- Gender Policy Advisor of the United Institute for Economic Development and Planning in Senegal.
- Chief of Department of Culture, Gender and Human Right at UNFPA in New York.
- First Chair of African Democracy Forum.

== Academic contributions ==
- Lectured and research at institutions in Nigeria, the UK, Canada and Senegal
- Published extensively, including works like Engendering Africa Social Sciences and two Specific Issues of Human Development.
- Delivered multiple speeches and interviews over women's rights at Women's Learning Partnership events.
