= Gender inequality in Nigeria =

Gender inequality refers to unequal treatment or perceptions of individuals wholly or partly due to their gender or sex. It arises from differences in socially constructed gender roles. Gender inequality in Nigeria is influenced by different cultures and beliefs. In most parts of Nigeria, women are considered subordinate to their male counterparts, especially in Northern Nigeria as well as in other sectors including the Nigeria music industry; politics, and education sector. It is generally believed that women are best suited as homemakers.

Article I of the Universal Declaration of Human Rights (UNDHR) provides: “All human beings are born free and equal in dignity and rights. They are endowed with reason and conscience and should act towards one another in a spirit of brotherhood. “ Article 2 of the UNDHR also re-emphasizes the equality of human persons as follows: “Everyone is entitled to all the rights and freedoms set forth in this declaration, without distinction of any kind, such as race, colour, sex, language, religion, political or other opinion, national or social origin, property, birth or other status.

== Feminism in Nigeria ==
Feminism did not appear in Nigeria until roughly 60 years ago. This has been attributed to Funmilayo Ransome-Kuti. She was born in Ogun State, Nigeria, and was educated through the British schooling system. She supported and fought for women's rights, as well as for women to have a larger impact in the Nigerian government. She was a part of the WIDF (Women's International Democratic Federation), which helped more women to gain government positions, furthering what she wished to accomplish with women in Nigeria. Ransome-Kuti died in 1978. However, Nwanyeruwa who had sparked the Aba Women’s Riots of 1929 as seen in British colonial records, could be considered by history to be the first well known feminist in Nigeria. She strategically executed an anti-colonial revolt alongside other women to redress social, political and economic inequality. The Aba Women’s war prompted colonial authorities to drop their plans to impose a tax on the market women.

A well-known Nigerian newspaper referred to her as "a progressive revolutionary" and "a Pan-African visionary." After the death of Funmilayo Ransome-Kuti, other Nigerian feminists like Chimamanda Ngozi Adichie, Bisi Adeleye-Fayemi and emerged.

Historically, feminist movements have tried to push agendas leading to more gender equality in Nigeria. Among the most known are Federation of Nigerian Women's Societies (FNWS), Women in Nigeria (WIN), Kudirat Initiative for Democracy (KIND), Female in Nigeria (FIN) and Feminist Coalition (a recent movement) Feminist Coalition. Still, most of them have failed to bring about significant political, social or economic growth. However, new feminist movements and gender awareness are forming in Nigeria. Online, women are using mobile phones for social capital building and empowerment as well as to access information and form relationships with communities they would not normally engage with.

=== Feminist movement in Nigeria ===
After the Aba women's riot in 1929, the Feminist Movement in Nigeria covertly and unintentionally got its start. Women are now clearly present in all walks of life in Nigeria as a result of the extraordinary increase that has been observed throughout time. Nigerian women practice a form of feminism that views men as complementing partners in progress rather than as rivals.

It is usually divided into three waves, which are;

1. The first wave which dealt with voting rights and property rights

2. The second wave which concentrated on equality and anti-discrimination

3. The third wave which began in the 1990s as a reaction to the second wave's alleged preference for white, straight women. Yoruba feminist scholar "Oyeronke Oyewumi" proposes that the transnational transfer of western concepts of gender, and subsequent gender roles, often does "little more than reproduce the patriarchal norms to which feminism developed out of opposition."

==== Examples of contemporary feminist movements in Nigeria. ====
Aside from the "Me Too movement", there have been other powerful hashtag campaigns, including "Female in Nigeria", which urged women to speak out about the difficult conditions that women in that nation faced, "Bring Back Our Girls", a drive to find hundreds of girls who had been abducted by the terrorist organization "Boko Haram", and most recently ""No More", an initiative started by Nigerian activist Ireti Bakare-Yusuf that aims to put an end to sexual abuse and impunity.

== See also ==
- Women in Nigeria
- Female empowerment in Nigeria
- Girl Child Labour in Nigeria
- Female genital mutilation in Nigeria
- Prostitution in Nigeria
