= Voting rights in Nigeria =

Overview of the topic

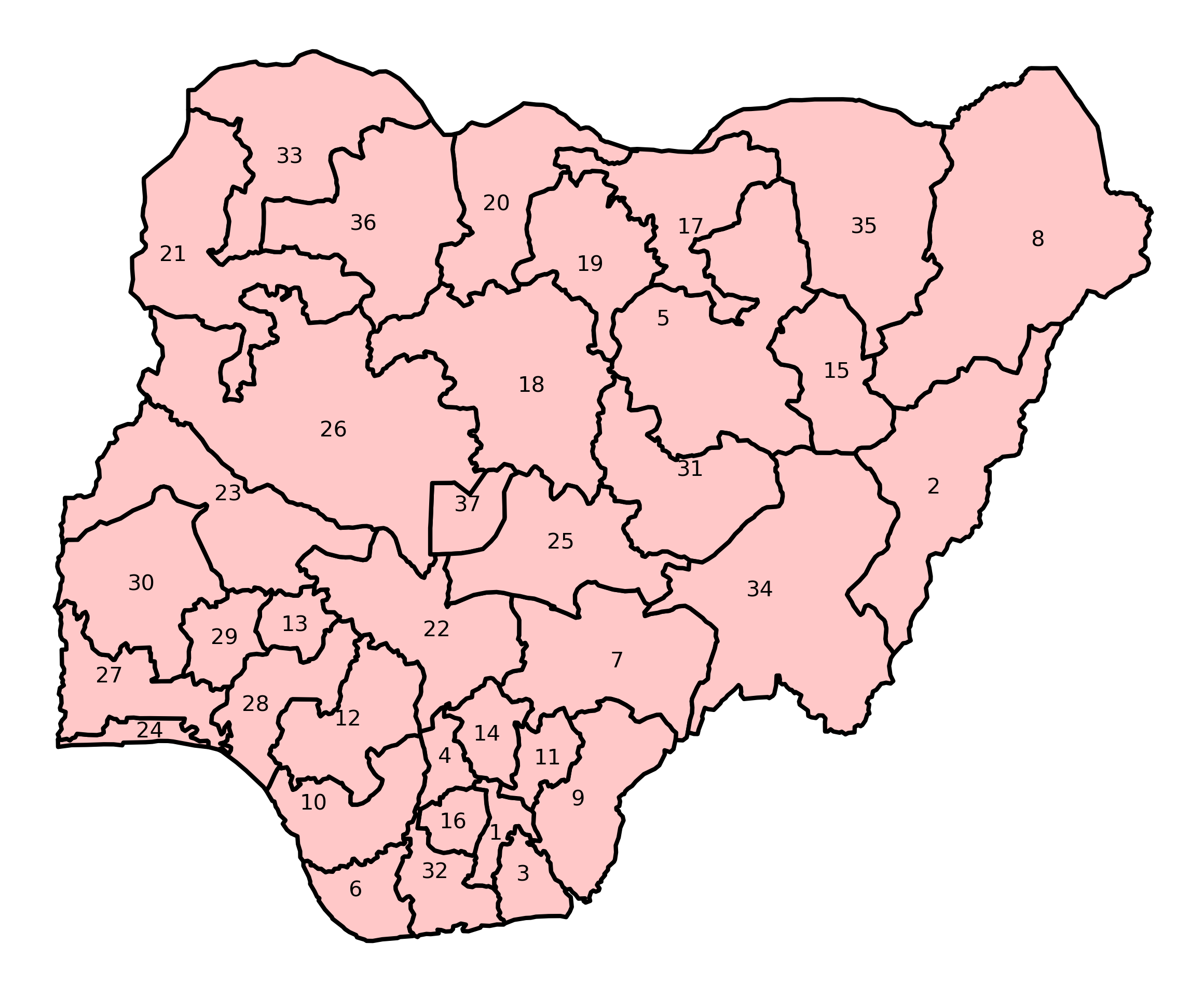
Nigeria numbered by its states

The history of voting rights in Nigeria mirrors the complexity of the nation itself.

Beginning within the country's colonial period, elections in Nigeria began in 1923 by the direction of British colonial administrator Hugh Clifford through a legislative act known as the Clifford Constitution. However, reflecting the variety of people groups and distinctive cultures confined with the nation's borders, the ethnolinguistic groups and colonial authorities that dominated the northern, eastern, and western regions of Nigeria (namely, the Hausa-Fulani, Igbo, and Yoruba people respectively) often offered vastly different perceptions into suffrage qualifications—notably including differences in gender, nationality, residency, age, tax, and income requirements—in Nigeria's early years. Though the qualifications that assured voting rights eventually became standardized under the Federal Constitution of Nigeria of 1960, just as quickly as voting rights were clarified, they were wholly revoked at the onset of several military coups beginning in 1966 and lasting until 1999. Though there were intermittent republican governments, only four elections took place from 1966 to 1999. The electoral process has differed within the many of governments of Nigeria's history and their corresponding constitutions.

Though women of the southern and eastern regions of the nation gained their voting rights in 1954, women of the northern region of Nigeria earned their right to vote in 1979. The suffrage movement was headed by several groups such as the Women's Movement of Nigeria and the women's wing of the Action Group.

Currently, there is an ongoing struggle regarding the role of members of the diaspora in electoral processes. Though several inroads have been made in the form of bills introduced in both the House and Senate, no concrete successes have been made.

== Milestones of national franchise changes ==
- 1923: Adult males who accumulate a minimum income of £100 in the year preceding the election, are residents of Lagos or Calabar for at least 1 year, are above the age of 21, and are British subjects or natives of the Nigerian protectorate are granted suffrage under Clifford Constitution.
- 1946: Adult males who possess £50 in property, are residents of Lagos or Calabar for at least 1 year, are above the age of 21, and are British subjects or natives of the Nigerian protectorate are granted suffrage under Richards Constitution.
- 1951: Adult males who have paid taxes somewhere in Nigeria within the year preceding the election, have resided in the electoral area in which they wish to vote for at least 1 year, are above the age of 21, and are British subjects or natives of the Nigerian protectorate are granted suffrage under Macpherson Constitution.
- 1979: Women are granted suffrage under the Constitution of the Federal Republic of Nigeria (1979). The voting age is also lowered to 18 and the citizenry is included in presidential elections.

== Colonial era ==
The right to vote has taken many forms in Nigeria's history. In the period from 1922 to 1950, under which both the Clifford Constitution of 1922 and the Richards Constitution of 1946 were enacted, the right to vote for members of the legislative council was extended exclusively to residents of Lagos and Calabar in the south. Under colonial Governor Hugh Clifford, indigenous Nigerians were first granted the right to elect their own representatives into the Legislative Council of the aforementioned municipalities. This right, termed the elective principle, emphasized that 4 of the 36 members of the Legislative Council must be elected by the native population. Though northerners were still not afforded the right to vote, with the enactment of the Richards Constitution, Nigeria was integrated under one general council with three regional councils in the north, west, and east. Voting rights in Lagos and Calabar were limited by gender, nationality, residency, age, and income requirements. The franchise was granted to those who were male, British subjects or natives of the Nigerian protectorate, residents of the Lagos or Calabar areas for at least a year, at least 21 years old, and generators of an income of at least £100 in the year prior to the election. Under these provisions, only 3,000 of the population of 40,000 were qualified in Lagos, and only 1,000 of the population of 10,000 were qualified in Calabar. Though elections took place in 1923, 1928, 1933, 1938, 1947, 1954, and 1959, under British colonial rule, suffrage was only extended to northern Nigerians in 1947.

In the period from 1950 to 1958, regionally specific and general voting qualifications of federal elections cohabited the political space due to the inapplicability of many general qualifications. The Macpherson Constitution enacted under colonial Governor John Macpherson in 1951 extended the elective principle of the Clifford Constitution in its provisions for a House of Representatives and Regional House of Assembly for the northern, western, and eastern regions. The Lyttleton Constitution of 1954 enacted under colonial Governor Oliver Lyttleton granted more power to each region by transforming Nigeria's formerly unitary system into a federal system. Nevertheless, in voting for the members required to fill the allotted number of seats, particular provisions guided the voting process and suffrage in each region. Though the specific regulations were developed by the federal government, they were tailored to fit the idiosyncrasies of each region. For example, in all regions except for Lagos circa 1951, all prospective voters needed to have paid taxes somewhere in Nigeria within a year of the election. This requirement was relaxed by 1954 in which only two regions, including Lagos at this point, had tax payment requirements for local elections. Notably, in the western region, this requirement included women—a group who had earned suffrage in both the eastern and western regions that very year. The respect for regional regulations in regard to voting rights contributed to the fact that in 1954, there was universal adult male suffrage in the Northern region, modified adult suffrage in the Western region and Lagos, and universal adult suffrage in the East. Highlighting yet another example of inconsistent regional voting practices, the general elections of 1954 witnessed the usage of electoral colleges in the northern region and in the southern Cameroons. In the northern region, the Northern House of Assembly Electoral Regulations of 1956 also granted the right to vote to male native foreigners, individuals defined as non-Nigerian persons whose parents are members of any African tribe. The native foreigner was still subject to a residency requirement that necessitated the prospective voter to have lived in the district where they desired to vote for at least 5 years prior to the election. For the election of members into state legislatures, distinct rules regarding suffrage were applied within each state exclusively.

== Independence movement and the First Nigerian Republic (1922–66) ==
As the Nigerian government completed the transition to home rule and witnessed the fall of the First Republic of Nigeria in the period from 1958 to 1966, the Elections (House of Representatives) Regulations of 1958 stated that the electoral regulations developed by the federal legislature would apply to all states, thereby removing the confluence of specific and general regulations in federal elections and establishing the ascendancy of federal laws. Despite this legislative action, the federal government retained its respect for regional voting rights in some capacities. Namely, though these regulations granted universal adult suffrage in both the Eastern and Western regions, the federal legislature respected the local regulations that maintained adult male suffrage in the North. The federal electoral regulations developed under the previous periods (with the notable exceptions of gender restrictions in some regions and taxation requirements in all regions) merged to form a generally unified approach to voting rights. The distinction of regulations concerning state elections also remained.

== Second Nigerian Republic (1979–83) ==
Under the Nigerian constitution of 1979, voting rights, or the right to register as a voter, were extended to all citizens of Nigeria who resided in Nigeria at the time of voter registration. Though the previous general elections only involved the election of members into legislative bodies, the 1979 Constitution provided for the election of the President and Vice-President by those granted the ability to vote in legislative elections.

== Third Nigerian Republic (1992–93) ==
The Nigerian constitution of 1993, which was intended to usher in democratic rule, was never fully implemented.

== Fourth Nigerian Republic (1999–) ==
Under the Nigerian constitution of 1999 and the Electoral Act of 2010, voting rights mirrored the provisions of the Second Nigerian Republic in which all citizens of Nigeria who resided in Nigeria at the time of voter registration were entitled to register as a voter.

== Minority rights ==
=== Women ===
Female suffrage was initially granted with regional specificity. In the Igbo-dominated eastern region and the Yoruba-dominated western region, women were allowed the right to vote in 1954. Though the Elections (House of Representatives) Regulations of 1958 standardized the federal distribution of voting rights across the nation, women in the northern region remained unable to vote until the late 70s. Universal suffrage was achieved finally in 1979 when women in northern states were granted the right to vote.

Nigeria was engaged involved in a broader West African debate about the role of women in electoral processes. Under pressure from parties such as the Women's Movement of Nigeria (WM) and the women wing of the Action Group (AG), British government and Nigerian underwent a series of constitutional conferences in order to ascertain the methods through which elections would be framed post-British colonization. The Lyttelton Constitution of 1954 afforded tax-paying Southern Nigerian women the right to vote and to be elected. However, due to the fact that many women did not pay taxes, the female electoral base was extremely limited. The WM, notably including its president Elizabeth Adekogbe, argued for universal suffrage excluding the tax requirement in order to expand the number of women able to contribute to the electoral process by voting or running for office. Only after the military coups of 1966–1978 was true universal suffrage granted under the 1979 Constitution of Nigeria.

=== Legal incapacities ===
Under the Electoral Act of 1982, those who are subject to legal incapacity to and are therefore not qualified to vote include individuals who pledge “allegiance, obedience, or adherence” to another nation, those who are subject to a death sentence or imprisonment for a term longer than six months and have not suffered the punishment or received a free pardon by the time of election, and those who have been disqualified under the act for other electoral offenses. The Chairman, other members of the Federal Electoral Commission (FEDECO), the Chief Federal Electoral Officer, Assistant Chief Federal Electoral Officers, electoral officers, assistant electoral officers, the returning officer and the assistant returning officer for each constituency, and the presiding officer are also not qualified to vote under this act.

The Electoral Act of 2010 similarly cites the fact that those who are subject to legal incapacities “under any law, rule, or regulation in force” in Nigeria are not entitled to vote.

== Diaspora voting ==
Historically, Nigerian members of the African diaspora have not been afforded the right to vote. Though previously stripped of their citizenship rights, in 1997, the federal government granted dual citizenship rights to Nigerian emigrants. Following the adoption of the Representation of the People Amendment Act (ROPAA) of Ghana in 1992, many Nigerian diaspora organizations argued for similar provisions in their ability to contribute to electoral processes. In 2005, the PDP Party held a public hearing regarding the extension of voting rights to members of the diaspora in Houston— the home of the largest population of Nigerian immigrants in the United States. Though the emigrants in attendance expressed support for diaspora voting rights, the diaspora bill introduced in 2005 did not advance past the first reading in the National Assembly until 2007. In 2012, Abike Dabiri-Erewa led the proposal of a bill in Nigeria’s Federal House of Representatives that would grant voting rights in the form of absentee voting for Nigerians abroad. Though the bill did not pass, it would have amended the Electoral Act 2010 by providing for offices of the Independent Electoral Commission (INEC) abroad and extending Section 12(1)(c) to include Nigerians in Diaspora as opposed to including only Nigerians residing in Nigeria.

In 2021, Minister of State for Foreign Affairs Zubairu Dada reiterated the Government's intent to enact diaspora voting, albeit not in time for the 2023 Nigerian general election, saying "The National Assembly is working closely with the Independent National Electoral Commission (INEC) to fashion a way to actualise diaspora voting. I remain very optimistic that in the not-too-distant future, it should be possible for Nigerians in the diaspora to participate in our national elections."
