= Donald Faulkner =

British colonial officer

Donald Ernest Faulkner was a British colonial officer who was the first Social Welfare Officer in a British colony in Africa. He was active in penal reforms for juvenile offenders and his office was involved in administering new legislation dealing with juvenile delinquency.

In 1934, as an Assistant Superintendent of Prisons, Faulkner was head of a juvenile reform school in Enugu under the aegis of the Prisons Department. The school provided technical training for juveniles convicted by a court of law. In 1941, on his way home to London for vacation and on the advice of his supervisor, he stayed in city conducting research with an official of the Education department on the issue of Boma boys and juvenile delinquents, his report was named Juvenile Delinquency in Lagos.

== Welfare officer ==
Prior to 1941, social welfare issues involving children were not a top priority for colonial officials in the British colonies in Africa with resources diverted fund economic programs. The few exceptions were the reform schools in Enugu and Yaba and grants to the Salvation Army. Child welfare services came under the administration of voluntary religious organizations and family structures. After the passage of the Colonial Development and Welfare Acts and concern about harassment of European and African soldiers arriving at the port by tour guides during World War II. A sub-committee was set up to look into the issue of juvenile delinquency and in its report, the committee recommended the creation of a welfare officer.

In 1941, Faulkner was appointed the first Social Welfare Officer within the British colonies in Africa. As welfare officer, he introduced clubs and hostels to remove vulnerable children from the street and advised the government to promulgate a youth ordinance similar to the British Children and Young Persons Act 1933.

Faulkner's study of children passing through the police department and reform schools, led him to conclude that there were two different groups of children that were adversely affected by lack of a stable home. A group of runaways, orphans and those left in Lagos who are mostly under twelve years in age and a second layers of sub-groups, who are over the age of twelve, these include poor, inexperienced and destitute children, delinquent adolescents and the more organized Boma boys. Overall, Faulkner's opinion of the youth were a bit positive, he found them resourceful, full of wits and yearning for freedom, liking them to urban cowboys. To develop youths, the department opened boys clubs, leisure and multi-sports venues for youths under the age of twenty one. His office also opened a matrimonial conciliation center and a reform school.

However, women groups, especially those opposed to child hawking were critical of his efforts in Lagos. His study on juveniles neglected girl child hawkers and African family members and solutions were focused on boys. A women's welfare council was launched in 1942 with the support of the Welfare Office, but Faulkner's conflict with the elite women led him to withdraw from the council in 1943.
