= Nigerian labour law =

Statutory laws covering Labour in the African state

Nigerian labour law looks into the rights, working conditions, minimum wage, termination clauses, and many other rules set by the government of Nigeria. The current version of the act was put into place in 2004, five years after their current constitution was established.

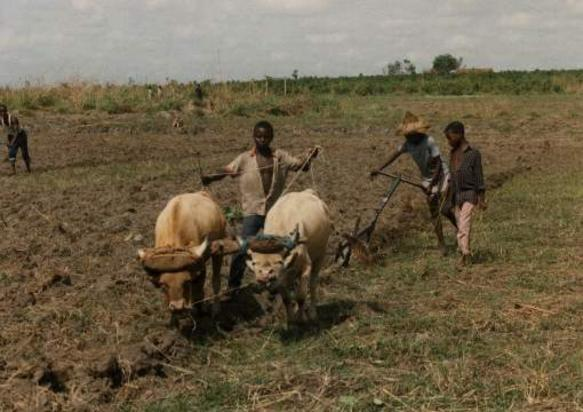
A group of men in Africa ploughing with oxen.

== History ==
1. The Labour Act, 2004
2. The Factories Act, 2004
3. The Pensions Act, 2004
4. The Trade Disputes Act, 2004
5. The Trade Union Amended Act, 2005
6. The Employees Compensation Act, 2010
7. The National Minimum Wage Act, 2011
8. The Pension Reform Act, 2014

== Rights of workers ==
=== Wages ===
The Labour Act of 2004 set the standard for the minimum amount of naira a worker in Nigeria is supposed to make. In 2004 the minimum wage was set to ₦5,500.00 per month. In 2011, the National Minimum Wage Act of 2011 set the minimum wage to ₦18,000.00 per month. The Labour Act of 2004 also has an exception that states that any establishment which employs fewer than 50 workers does not have to abide to the Nigerian minimum wage. In 2019, a new implementation for an increase to more than 50,000 Naira was advocated but later settled to 30,000 Naira which has commenced payment at that rate.

=== Pensions ===
The Pension Act of 2004 established a contributory pension scheme for people employed in the public and private sector of Nigeria. The amount that has to be contributed towards the pension is 7% of an employee's paycheck. It also states that in the event of an employee's death that the next-of-kin is to receive their pension and any benefits from their life insurance policy. In the act, it allows retired employees to receive retirement benefits.

=== Leave ===
Under legislation passed in 2004, every employee is entitled to twenty-one days' leave after working for twelve months of continuous service and in the case of people under 16 years old 12 leave days. The exception to this rule is in the case in which an employer and employee agree to extend the period of entitled leave from 12 months to 24 months, but no more than 24 months. Employees also have up to 12 days of paid sick leave per year in which an employee is allowed absence from their job as long as a registered medical practitioner certifies the illness (Adesegun-Smith, 10–11). A woman also has the right to maternity leave as long as she provides a written medical certificate from a medical doctor stating that she should not or cannot work. The medical certificate allows a woman to not work for approximately six weeks before the birth of her baby and six weeks after the birth of her baby. She's also owed at least 50% of her normal wages as long as she has been employed for six months. She is also allowed two extra thirty-minute breaks for the purpose of nursing her child.

=== Transportation ===
The labour act also provides transportation for employees in situations in which they have to travel over 16 km (9.9 mi). In that situation, the employer might provide free transportation. It is also mandatory that the vehicle is in good condition, sanitary, and not overcrowded.

=== National Housing Fund ===
Under Nigerian Law, employees who make over ₦3,000 must also contribute 2.5% of their paycheck to the National Housing Fund, which is controlled by the Federal Mortgage Bank of Nigeria. Any company who fails to deduct 2.5% from a pay cheque of an employer could face a fine of ₦50,000.

=== Termination ===
The Labour Act of 2004 allows for a few different ways in which employees can be terminated. The first method is in the event of the death of an employee. The second is that either party may terminate the employment contract as long as the other party is given notice. The amount of notice given goes as follows: one day's notice for a contract that has lasted less than three months, one week of notice for a contract that has lasted more than three months but less than two years, two weeks for a contract that has lasted more than two years but less than five years, and one month for a contract that has lasted for more than five years. Also within the terms of the contract, all payments must be made to an employee before his contract is terminated.

== See also ==
- Child labour in Nigeria
