= 1933 Nigerian general election =

General elections were held in Nigeria in 1933. The Nigerian National Democratic Party (NNDP) won three of the four elected seats in the Legislative Council.

== Electoral system ==
The 1922 Nigeria (Legislative Council) Order in Council provided for a 46-member Legislative Council, of which 23 were ex-officio officials, four were nominated officials, up to 15 were appointed unofficial members and four were elected (three in Lagos and one in Calabar). The 23 ex officio officials included the Governor, the Chief Secretary and their deputy, the Lieutenant Governors and secretaries of the Northern and Southern Provinces, the Attorney General, the Commandant of the Nigerian Regiment, the Director of Medical Services, the Treasurer, the Director of Marine, the Comptroller of Customs, the Secretary of Native Affairs, together with ten senior residents.

The franchise was restricted to men aged 21 or over who were British subjects or a native of Nigeria who had lived in their municipal area for the 12 months prior to the election, and who earned at least £100 in the previous calendar year. The right to vote was withheld from those who had been convicted of a crime and sentenced to death, hard labour or prison for more than a year, or were of "unsound mind". Only 1,118 people registered to vote in Lagos out of a population of 126,108, whilst just three registered in Calabar (the population of the town was 16,653 according to the 1931 census).

All eligible voters could also run as candidates unless they had an undischarged bankruptcy, had received charitable relief in the previous five years or were a public servant. Candidates were required to obtain the nomination of at least three registered voters and pay a £10 deposit. The term of the council was five years.

== Campaign ==
Four candidates contested the three Lagos seats, of which three were NNDP incumbents (Crispin Adeniyi-Jones, Eric Moore and T. A. Doherty). The other candidate, Olayinka Alakija, was a barrister. In Calabar C. W. Clinton was the only candidate, and was elected unopposed.

== Results ==
Party	Votes	%	Seats	+/–
Nigerian National Democratic Party	2,258	91.86	3	0
Calabar Ratepayers' Association			1	1
Independents	200	8.14	0	0
Total	2,458	100.00	4	0
Registered voters/turnout	1,121	–		
Source: Tamuno

=== By constituency ===
Lagos (three members)
Candidate	Party	Votes	%
Eric Moore	Nigerian National Democratic Party	797	32.42
Crispin Adeniyi-Jones	Nigerian National Democratic Party	760	30.92
T. A. Doherty	Nigerian National Democratic Party	701	28.52
Olayinka Alakija	Independent	200	8.14
Total		2,458	100.00
Registered voters/turnout		1,118	–
Source: Tamuno

=== List of members ===
Governor Donald Cameron appointed 14 unofficial members to the Legislative Council, of which seven were Europeans and seven Africans. The seven Europeans represented commercial interests, with three representing the banking, mining and shipping sectors, and four representing commercial interests of Calabar, Kano, Lagos and Port Harcourt. The seven Africans represented African Traders, the Colony of Lagos, Oyo Province, Rivers district, the Egba and the Ibo, as well as one seat representing the cities of Benin and Warri.

Unlike the previous elections in 1928 when there were only two new appointees, six of the Africans appointed to the council in 1933 were new (only I T Palmer was reappointed), whilst there were four new members amongst the commercial appointees.

Constituency	Member
Elected members
Calabar	C. W. Clinton
Lagos	Crispin Adeniyi-Jones
Lagos	T. A. Doherty
Lagos	Eric Moore
Nominated African members
African Traders	B.O.E. Amobi
Benin & Warri	I.T. Palmer
Colony	Henry Rawlingson Carr
Egba	Adeyemo Alakija
Ibo	G.T. Basden
Oyo Province	A.S. Agbaje
Rivers district	S.B. Rhodes
Nominated commercial members
Banking	L.M. Herepath (Barclays)
Mining	J. West
Shipping	H.S. Feggetter
Calabar	H.B. Wheeler
Kano	T. Hepburn
Lagos	R.F. Irving
Port Harcourt	P.H. Davey
Source: Wheare

== Aftermath ==
During the term of the Legislative Council, several members were replaced; T H W Beard became the appointed Calabar member on 12 June 1934. In 1935 W T Ogden became the Shipping member on 2 March, A Egbe became the appointed member for Benin-Warri on 4 March and N D Oyerinde became the appointed member for Oyo Province on 20 May, whilst G T Basden left the council on 1 December and was not replaced. On 29 November 1937 R M Williams of the United Africa Company became the new appointed member for Lagos and D D Beard was appointed as the Banking member.
