= Women in Nigeria (organization) =

Women in Nigeria (WIN) is a political interest organization founded in 1982. The organization's interest concerns women's liberation, equality and social justice in Nigeria. WIN is different from early women's groups in Nigeria because it affirms the belief that women's rights cannot be secured without addressing the broader issue of human rights (for both men and women) in an oppressive society. At its inception, the organization had male members.

WIN's feminist and militant publications and activities were notable in the 1980s and 1990s but in recent times, the activities of the organization have been more moderate.

== History ==
The movement to form Women in Nigeria evolved out of a study group of university sociology and political science lecturers at ABU. The study focused on the life of women in Nigeria. As the ideas from other scholars and lecturers from various universities were added, the group began to grow. In 1982, the First Annual Women in Nigeria Conference was held in Zaria. It included presentations by Ayesha Iman, Bene Madunagu, Bilkisu Yusuf, Renee Pittin, Molara Ogundipe-Leslie and Therese Nweke.

WIN was formally launched thereafter, with attendees of the initial conference pledging to lend support. The primary mission of WIN is to bring awareness and change regarding the widespread oppression and exploitation of women in Nigeria. Many of the participants of the first conference became WIN members. WIN seeks equality for men and women who are oppressed in Nigeria, but that women are particularly exploited. WIN linked oppression of women to the overall oppression witnessed by citizens of the society especially the poor and in the process introduced class and gender dynamics in the struggle for women's emancipation.

Though it is a women's right organization, WIN also fights for social and economic justice. At inception, male members constituted 30% of members but over the years, the active participation of male members declined.

== Activities ==
=== Financing ===
The organization generates funding from grants provided by donors such as the Heinrich Boll Foundation and from membership dues.

=== 1980s:Research and documentation ===
Most pioneer members of WIN had academic backgrounds which influenced some of its goals. A primary aim of WIN is the collection of data through research of the conditions of women in the country. The organization ended up publishing books and papers about its findings. Its first major book was Women in Nigeria published in 1985. Since then WIN has published other papers including Women in Nigeria-The First Ten years (1993), Child Abuse (1992) and Women and Violence:Breaking the Silence.

WIN also published a newsletter and held annual conferences in the 1980s.

=== 1990s-Present ===
In 1991, WIN received a grant from the Heinrich Boll Foundation to initiate a credit and political empowerment scheme for rural women. The empowerment program granted loans to specific women's groups in five states of the federation. In addition to the loans, it engaged the local women organizations in seminars about rights, democracy and educational programs on self-reliance.

In 1993, some members of WIN wrote a communique condemning the annulment of the presidential election. The organization also collaborated with Campaign for Democracy pressing for the release of the election results.

WIN's activities have been tame since the late 1990s. The organization depends on a volunteer base for staffing and external donors for financial support. At one of its annual conventions which also the venue to elect a new leader, the election split the organization into two factions. But in time, the leaders of those factions and many of their supporters took on employment in other NGOs, or outside the country further weakening the organization. In addition, prior to the election, men, who were about two-thirds of its members, felt marginalized by the activities of the organization.

== See also ==
- Women in Nigeria
- Gender inequality in Nigeria

== Sources ==
- Amadiume, Ifi (2000). Daughters of the Goddess, Daughters of Imperialism: African Women Struggle for Culture, Power and Democracy. Zed Books.
- Olojede, Iyabo (2000). Women's interest organisations: encounters with the state on issues of good governance (Report). Civil Society and Governance Programme, IDS.
