= Baba Ijesha child sexual assault case =

2021 child sexual abuse case of Nollywood actor

Baba Ijesha
- Born: Olanrewaju James; 28 October 1974 (age 51); Nigeria
- Other name: Olarenwaju Omiyinka
- Occupation: Actor

Olanrewaju James, known professionally as Baba Ijesha, is a Nigerian actor who has appeared in Yoruba-language Nollywood productions. He was arrested in April 2021 following allegations of sexual assault against a 14-year-old minor girl. He was subsequently convicted by the Lagos State High Court in July 2022, and was released from prison in November 2025 after serving his sentence as affirmed by the Court of Appeal. Following his release, the Lagos State Government confirmed that his name had been entered into the Lagos State Sex Offenders Register. The case attracted sustained public attention in Nigeria and generated significant coverage in the Nigerian press.

== Arrest and charges ==
On 19 April 2021, a video recording that purportedly showed James sexually assaulting a minor circulated online, prompting a report to the Sabo Police Station in Yaba, Lagos, by comedian Damilola Adekoya, known as Princess, who was the foster mother of the girl. James was arrested on 22 April 2021 by the Lagos State Police and the matter was transferred to the Gender Unit of the State Criminal Investigation Department at Panti. On 4 May 2021, the Lagos State Directorate of Public Prosecutions issued legal advice confirming that a prima facie case had been disclosed against James and recommended that he be charged under several provisions of the Criminal Law of Lagos State 2015, including sections governing indecent treatment of a child, defilement of a child, sexual assault by penetration, attempted sexual assault by penetration, and sexual assault. James was arraigned before the Lagos State Special Offences Court in Ikeja on 24 June 2021 on a six-count charge comprising: sexual assault by penetration (2014); indecent treatment of a child; sexual assault (2011); indecent treatment of a child (2015); sexual assault (2015); and attempted sexual assault by penetration (2021).

== Trial ==
The trial was conducted at the Lagos State Domestic Violence and Sexual Offences Court in Ikeja before Justice Oluwatoyin Taiwo. The prosecution presented six witnesses, including the girl, the foster mother, investigating officers, and medical experts. The defence presented four witnesses, including James himself, and was led by two Senior Advocates of Nigeria, Babatunde Ogala and Dada Awosika. During proceedings, James stated in his defense that he had been invited to the complainant's residence to perform in a scripted production and denied that the encounter constituted a criminal act. He acknowledged, however, that he had not been aware of the presence of a closed-circuit television camera in the premises on the relevant date. The court rejected this argument, finding that the interaction between James and the minor on 19 April 2021 was not a theatrical performance but a personal encounter.

== Conviction and sentencing (2022) ==
On 14 July 2022, Justice Taiwo delivered judgment, finding James guilty on four of the six counts. He was acquitted and discharged on count one (sexual assault by penetration, 2014) and count six (attempted sexual assault by penetration, 2021), on the basis that the prosecution had not proved those charges beyond reasonable doubt. The court found that the prosecution had successfully proved counts two and three, namely that James had indecently placed the girl on his lap and rubbed his penis on her body during incidents between 2013 and 2014, and counts four and five, namely that he had indecently touched her and sexually assaulted her on 19 April 2021. The court noted that James had confessed to the 2021 conduct in two separate statements made at Sabo Police Station on 19 April 2021 and at the State Criminal Investigation Department, Panti, on 28 April 2021. The sentences imposed were: five years imprisonment for count two; three years for count three; five years for count four; and three years for count five. The court ordered that all sentences run concurrently, meaning the effective custodial term was five years, calculated from the date James had been remanded in custody. The total aggregate sentence, if served consecutively, would have been sixteen years.

== Appeal proceedings ==
James appealed to the Court of Appeal, Lagos Division, in Appeal No. CA/LAG/CR/544/2023. Judgment was delivered on 28 June 2024 by a panel comprising Justice Folashade Ojo (presiding), Justice Abdullahi Bayero, and Justice Paul Bassi. The Court of Appeal set aside the convictions relating to counts two and three, which concerned alleged offences committed between 2013 and 2014, on the basis that the testimony of the principal prosecution witness regarding those incidents constituted hearsay. The appellate court affirmed the convictions on counts four and five, relating to the events of 19 April 2021, finding that the same witness had been an eyewitness to those events, that James had voluntarily confessed to the conduct in his police statements, and that he had not challenged the witness's account during trial. The sentences for counts four and five, to run concurrently, were affirmed, leaving the effective custodial term at five years. James subsequently appealed to the Supreme Court of Nigeria in Suit No. SC/CR/757/2024. On 29 May 2025, the Supreme Court struck out the appeal on grounds of incompetence. James thereafter filed a motion for leave to bring a fresh appeal in Suit No. SC.ML/333/2025, which the Supreme Court dismissed on 9 October 2025, leaving the Court of Appeal judgment fully intact.

== Release and aftermath ==
James was released from the Lagos correctional facility on 14 November 2025, having served the full custodial term affirmed by the Court of Appeal. His release generated public discussion, including conflicting claims regarding the basis for his discharge. The Lagos State Attorney-General and Commissioner for Justice, Lawal Pedro, issued a formal clarification on 17 November 2025 stating that James had not been acquitted or exonerated and that his release was solely the result of completing his sentence. The Lagos State Domestic and Sexual Violence Agency confirmed that James's name had been entered into the Lagos State Sex Offenders Register in accordance with Section 37 of the Lagos State Domestic and Sexual Violence Agency Law 2021. In June 2026, The Punch reported that James and fashion designer Abiodun Tokunbo had announced the birth of a son, generating further public reaction.
