= Female genital mutilation in Nigeria =

Nigeria has the highest absolute number of female genital mutilation (FGM) (Note: Also known as female circumcision or female genital cutting (FGC)) cases in the world. It is usually experienced by girls aged 0 to 15 years old. It involves either partial or complete removal of the vulva or other injury to the female genital organs and has no medical benefit.

The practice is harmful to girls and women and is seen as a violation of human rights. Its consequences include infertility, maternal death, infections, and diminished sexual pleasure.

As of 2012, 27% of Nigerian women aged 15 to 49 had suffered FGM. While in some regions of Nigeria, the prevalence of FGM has halved in the past 30 years as of 2016, as of 2022, it is rising among girls aged 0–14, making Nigeria the third highest-ranked country for FGM worldwide in terms of percentage, according to UNICEF.

In May 2015, then President Goodluck Ebele Jonathan signed a federal law banning FGM. Opponents of the practice cite this move as an important step forward in Africa, as Nigeria is the most populous country and has set an important precedent. However, activists and scholars stress the necessity of a cultural shift to fully eradicate the practice, as the new law alone may not address the broader issue of violence against women and girls and the status of women in Nigeria.

== Cultural perception ==
The practice is mostly carried out by traditional practitioners of FGM, who often lack complete knowledge of human anatomy and medical procedures.

Despite the severity of the issue, societies in which the practice is prevalent view it as an integral part of their tradition and cultural identity. In communities that practice FGM, it is closely tied to ethnicity, culture, social norms, and sometimes seen as a religious obligation. In Nigeria, it is performed by Muslims, Christians and Jews. It has strong associations among Muslim communities, but is not mentioned in the Quran, the Muslim holy book, or the religious texts of Christianity or Judaism; the practise pre-dates the arrival of these religions in Nigeria. In the majority of documented cases, it is family members (such as parents and grandparents, in particular mothers and grandmothers) who perform FGM on their daughters and granddaughters. It is associated with ensuring a daughter's virginity, which is deemed necessary for arranging her marriage, securing a proper bride price, and upholding family honour. Efforts to eliminate FGM have been seen as a threat to Nigerian culture, particularly among older women who underwent the practise in their youths.

It is also associated with increased sexual pleasure for men and increased fertility and ability to conceive for the women, as well as increasing the likelihood of the child's survival; however, these beliefs are untrue. Families often conform to the tradition due to social pressure and the fear of being excluded from the community. Girls who have not undergone the procedure are often considered unworthy of marriage and unclean, and it is a social taboo. They may also face bullying or discrimination within society. In many cases, girls themselves succumb to peer and societal pressure out of fear of stigma and rejection from their community, accepting the practice as normal and necessary.

Achieving gender equality and empowering all women and girls is the fifth Sustainable Development Goal (SDG) but is unlikely to be enacted as a Nigerian law as it contradicts the traditional patriarchal aspects of Nigerian culture, especially Islamic views of women.

Data shows that the majority of people believe FGM should end, but they cite social pressures to continue the practice with their daughters. Men especially do not favor the practice and do not desire its continuation. Of the factors that influence Nigerians to support FGM, the most significant is socio-economic status. In general, the poorer a person is, the more likely they are to support FGM, and vice versa. Among women aged 15 to 49 polled between 2004 and 2015, 64% want to end the practice.

Human rights activists believe the 2015 federal ban in Nigeria will influence other African countries—a region in which the practice is highly prevalent—because of Nigeria's economic and political strength within the continent. Since 2015, Sudan has banned the practice.

== Types practiced ==
Female Genital Mutilation is a practice that is rooted with African culture. It is the partial or complete removal of the female clitoris for cultural or religious reasons. Culturally, it is done to enhance the marriageability of a woman because she will be preserved for marriage. Women who have undergone FGM cannot have vaginal intercourse, thus ensuring premarital sex cannot take place. It is also done sometimes to enhance the social status of families that have their female children undergo the process because it means they have virgin children. Despite no religions explicitly allowing or endorsing it, some Nigerians have used religion as a stated reason.

Nigerians practice the following forms of female genital cutting/mutilation:

- Type I, clitoridectomy: Removing the clitoral hood and at least part of the clitoris. This is also called ritualistic circumcision. In this case, the clitoris is nicked to cause bleeding. This is the least harmful type of mutilation and does not cause any long term damage.
- Type II, sunna: Removing the full clitoris and part of the labia minora. This full removal of the full clitoris and the outer layer covering the clitoris. The clitoris is generally not damaged.
- Type III, infibulation: Removing the clitoris, labia minora, and labia majora. This also involves stitching the vaginal opening with a minuscule hole for urination and menstrual bleeding.
- Type IV: Other unclassified forms of FGM may involve pricking, stretching, cauterization, or inserting herbs into the vagina. In this case, the external female genitalia is removed with most of the labia major being cut or scraped away. The rest of the labia majora and vaginal opening is sewn together.

Clitoridectomies are more common in the south of the country, and the more extreme methods, like infibulation, are prevalent in the north. Oftentimes tools like kitchen knives and broken glass are used to perform the cut. They are not usually sterilized before usage. It is a forceful act and is performed with the victim being held down by many women in the society.

== Consequences of Female Genital Mutilation ==
According to the World Health Organization, Female Genital Mutilation has no real health benefits. It has short and long-term health risks that affect girls and women that are forced to undergo the procedure. It negatively affects the natural functioning of the female reproductive system and is considered a violation of human rights.

=== Risks, Short-term ===
When Female Genital Mutilation takes place, the first risk is shock. It is not an appropriate procedure for the female body, so the excessive pain can cause a female to go into shock. Excessive bleeding also frequently happens, which can cause hemorrhage because a clitoral artery or blood vessel has been improperly cut. Complications with urination could also happen because in some excessive cases the labia majora is sewn together. This blocks the opening of the bladder and makes urination very difficult and sometimes completely impossible. Urination issues could also be due to tissue swelling and pain in the urethra. Many infections are bound to happen because of the way the process takes place. Female Genital Mutilation is mostly done under unsanitary conditions, using non-sterile sharp objects to perform the cutting. Because of these conditions, the girls and women are subject to infections like wound infections and long term diseases like Human Immunodeficiency Virus, which is caused by using contaminated objects.

Mentally, Female Genital Mutilation could be damning to a person. It is bound to cause psychological distress to a person that has to undergo it. In children, loss of confidence and trust could take place. Children will no longer trust the people that are supposed to care for and protect them because of the pain that has been caused. It is known that Female Genital Cutting is often done by female elders in the society. These are the people that usually also care for the children so these children could associate their caregivers with pain. The pain and trauma that goes along the cutting and mutilation could cause severe depression. Conversely, in Nigerian society, those who haven't undergone the procedure could face peer pressure and sexual violence because of the harsh expectations surrounding them.

=== Risks, Long-term ===
Long term, Female Genital Mutilation and cutting has major effects on the sexual and reproductive health of a woman. Out of all the types of mutilations, the type with most negative long-term effects is Type III infibulation. Child birth is immediately affected when female genital cutting happens. In infibulation, the clitoris and labia major and minora are removed and the vaginal opening is sewn together. Because of this closing, there is almost no chance of child birth even though premarital sex is ultimately preserved. Reproduction can no longer take place. There are also different lasting injuries that could happen like chronic genital and reproductive tract infections, cysts and scar injuries could form. Because of the sewing of the vaginal opening together, there could be an accumulation of menstrual flow at the vagina and urethra. This causes major diseases and infections.

== Activism ==
Organizations seeking to end FGC/M in Nigeria include the World Health Organization, UNICEF, the International Federation of Gynaecology and Obstetrics, African Union, Devatop Centre for Africa Development, the Economic Commission for Africa, the Coalition of Advocates against Violence and the Population Council. as well as Justice, Development and Peace Movement (JDPM) of the Catholic diocese of Oyo.

The Circumcision Descendants Association of Nigeria (CDAN)—a group whose members perform FGM in Nigeria, has advocated to end the practice by creating new government programs and economic opportunities for those who perform female genital mutilation.

In May 2015 former Nigerian president, Goodluck Ebele Jonathan, signed off on a law that permanently bans Female Genital Mutilation and cutting. The Violence Against Persons Prohibition Act (VAPP) aims to permanently prohibit female circumcision by including a penalty. People caught committing the crime are liable to two years in prison and a fine of one hundred thousand Naira. Even with the new law, as of 2015 female circumcision was still practiced in six states. The VAPP act was a nationwide response that the former president had to the constant practice of Female Genital Mutilation. In 2018, an event organized by UN Women, the United Nations Population Fund (UNFPA) and the Nigerian Mission to the UN, with other partners to help promote change of perceptions for the women in Africa. Highlighting themes such as human trafficking, suicide bombing, female genital mutilation/cutting and sexism and sexual harassment at the United Nations, Ms. Itua, one of the presenters of the UN showcase the importance of women taking an active role in their nations said "As an African woman, I believe that my goal is to work with other women in creating awareness. Together we are stronger. Working together to be stronger to change the narrative coming out of Africa."

In many rural areas of Nigeria, Female Genital Mutilation is still practiced. In these parts of Nigeria education is not easily accessed. It is important that Nigerian citizens are properly educated on the dangers and negative effects of female circumcision. According to studies, health education positively affects the attitude people have towards FGM. With education, people are informed of the VAPP act and how the nation can fright against communities that still do not understand the negativities that come with female circumcision.

Other Nigerian organizations that constantly fight and protect girls and women from Female Genital Mutilation are:

- The Center for Social Value and Early Childhood Development
- Value Female Network
- The Center for Women's Studies and Intervention

== See also ==
- Women in Nigeria
- Gender inequality in Nigeria
