= Yinka Jegede-Ekpe =

Nigerian HIV/AIDS activist

- Born: 1978 (age 46–47); Nigeria
- Occupation: HIV/AIDS Activist
- Organization: The Nigerian Community of Women Living with HIV/AIDS
- Known for: First Nigerian woman to come out as HIV-positive
- Children: 3
- Awards: Reebok Human Rights Award (2004)

Yinka Jegede-Ekpe (born c. 1978) is a Nigerian HIV/AIDS activist. After being diagnosed as HIV-positive, she became the first Nigerian woman to publicly announce her status. She experienced discrimination and set up the Nigerian Community of Women Living With HIV/AIDS organisation to raise awareness of HIV/AIDS in Nigeria. In 2006, she gave birth to a healthy HIV-negative baby.

== Early life ==
When she was 19 and living in the city of Ilesa, Nigeria, Jegede-Ekpe was concerned by rashes on her body and decided to take a blood test. She then found out that she was HIV-positive. After the blood test for her boyfriend (her only sexual partner) came back negative, she remembered a visit to a dentist who worked in unsanitary conditions and assumed she had come into contact with contaminated blood. In the early 2000s, Jegede-Ekpe decided to make her HIV-positive status public, which at the time was a controversial course of action. She was the first Nigerian woman to do this. She experienced discrimination and was shunned by friends and colleagues fearful of HIV/AIDS: her choir refused to sing with her any more; she was studying medicine at Wesley Nursing School and the administration pressed her to stop. However, she continued to study and graduated as a nurse in 2001.

== Career ==
Jegede-Ekpe became an activist raising awareness of HIV/AIDS in Nigeria and set up the Nigerian Community of Women Living With HIV/AIDS organisation. The organisation aimed to transmit information and to help the voices of women to be heard. It planned to set up funds to help women in crisis and to educate orphans. She commented later that "when people like myself come out, you see the faces of the epidemic for the first time. I'm not a fact or figure. And they can see that people like me can live a normal life". As of 2004, nearly 6 percent of the Nigerian population (7 million people) had HIV/AIDS and 75 percent of all HIV-positive Africans aged between 15 and 24 were female. Speaking at the Harvard School of Public Health in Boston, Massachusetts, Jegede-Ekpe remarked that the HIV/AIDS epidemic in Nigeria would not be solved until women and men were treated equally.

Jegede-Ekpe became a consultant for UNICEF and in 2001 the organisation helped her to access antiretroviral drugs for her own health after a friend was shocked by her weight loss. She married a fellow campaigner who is also HIV-positive. In 2006, she gave birth to a healthy baby girl, who tested HIV-negative. In 2004, Jegede-Ekpe won a Reebok Human Rights Award for her work on HIV/AIDS awareness.

== See also ==
- Bisi Alimi
- HIV/AIDS in Africa
- Women in Nigeria
