= Female empowerment in Nigeria =

Economic and social movement

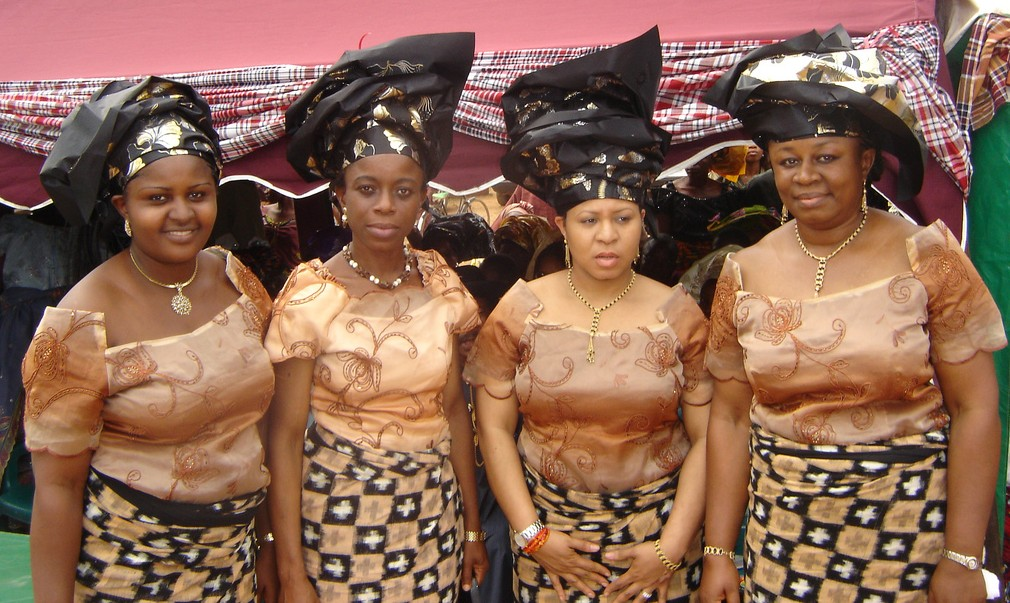
Nigerian women

Female empowerment in Nigeria is an economic process that involves empowering Nigerian women as a poverty reduction measure. Empowerment is the development of women in terms of politics, social and economic strength in nation development. It is also a way of reducing women's vulnerability and dependency in all spheres of life. It can be noted that the aggregate of educational, political, health and legal empowerment are key to women's empowerment in Nigeria. Like many African women, Nigerian women have a subordinate role to their male counterparts. There are twice as many women below the poverty line than men and up to 19 times as many men in executive positions than women.

== Social imbalances ==
At the core of Nigeria's social imbalance is a distorted power dynamic in determining family size. This male-centered focus points to a critical population problem. Women are eliminated from the decision-making process of how many children they are going to have and when they are to have them. There are very few population control guides that target men to reduce the high fertility rate. For anything to work as far as population control, men and women must both have equal power in the household. There are imbalances within marriage, religious and government institutions, and access to good health programs. The United Nations, as well as a majority of nations across the globe, have developed and organized programs that aim to ameliorate gender inequalities. Women's development was adopted as the third-millennium goal in 2000, the World Conference on Women in Beijing 2000, and many others.

== Political and financial constraints ==
Women are nearly non-existent on the Nigerian political scene, more so at the federal and state levels. Male domination of decision-making and violence has led to women not feeling free and comfortable enough to engage in political matters. Additionally, successful political advisors are not likely to support female candidates so it could be difficult for them to pave a path in politics. There are major differentiations when it comes to starting businesses and getting credit loans for men vs. women in Nigeria. When women in business have fewer employees and shorter longevity than men, this gender gap becomes even wider. Within the countries of Tunisia and Zimbabwe, women business owners worked in time intervals throughout the day. The time involved in maintaining a business with little pay was undesirably restrictive and directly conflicted with their family responsibilities. There have been experimental techniques to expand women-led businesses in Nigeria such as advocating start-ups and productivity through grants, mentoring, and business technical training. A program by the name of YouWiN!, gave insight to young men and women on how to carry out their business ideas and conquer certain challenges that come with starting a business.

== Indices ==
In Nigeria, the effect of women empowerment can be measured using indices such as education, literacy rate, employment, and leadership roles. Lynne Featherstone has said that "High rates of maternal mortality and violence against women make Nigeria one of the toughest places in the world to be born a girl".

== Government initiative ==
In looking to achieve the Millennium goal of women's development, the Nigerian government initiated the Women's Fund for Economic Empowerment and Business Development for women entrepreneurs, while "second chance" was meant to re-introduce dropped-out women due to pregnancy back to school. At the Sixty-fourth General Assembly, it was reported that "the number of senior female civil servants was judged to be 22.5 percent, while judicial appointment across the 36 States constituted about 30 percent. A national action plan on the Promotion and Protection of Human Rights in Nigeria was deposited with the United Nations Human Rights Council in Geneva in July 2009. A chapter was devoted to the rights of women and children. A National Policy on Sexual Harassment in Educational Institutions has also been put in place. Free medical treatment was provided for victims of domestic and sexual violence at temporary shelters that were being established nationwide. Nigeria was also working to improve the education of girls by recruiting more female teachers, creating skill acquisition programmes for girls and women, and providing textbooks at subsidized rates, among other measures. Judges and magistrates were continuously being trained on gender and women's rights. Health system facilities were being scaled up".

== Education ==
Educational statistics have been used as an indicator of gender inequalities versus women's empowerment in Nigeria. The population census conducted in 1991 by the Federal Government of Nigeria found that 61% (41 million) of Nigerian women "suffer from intellectual poverty". In Africa, there are different forms of education, such as agricultural extension programmes, in-service training, out-of-school education, audio-visual education, mass media education, vocational education, in-service personnel training, community development, cooperative education, evening classes, library services, extra-moral education, and trade union education.

The report shows that Nigerian women are not favored in the evolution of the educational system in the country. In 1965, 37.75% of the population in primary schools were girls while only 9% of undergraduates were female. By 1974, the percentage of female undergraduates increased to 25.5%. The major enrollment from girls was only in teaching and social courses. In absolute terms, there were 138,334 male and 50,652 female students in Nigerian universities during this period. The challenges faced by girls were due to the perception of society on gender qualities.

== Health ==
In urban areas of Nigeria, more empowered women are significantly more likely to use modern contraception, deliver in a health facility, and have a skilled attendant at birth. Female autonomy is significantly associated with modern contraceptive use among married women in northern Nigeria, despite the region's conservative and traditional societal norms. Specifically, economic freedom, attitudes against domestic violence, and greater decision-making autonomy were positively associated with these reproductive health outcomes. However, these effects varied by region, with the strongest associations observed in northern cities in Nigeria, highlighting the importance of context-specific strategies to improve gender equality in health. Women’s participation in household decision-making significantly influenced maternal and childcare utilization in Nigeria. Specifically, women involved in their own healthcare decisions were more likely to attend more antenatal care visits, and those participating in decisions on large household purchases were more likely to deliver in health facilities. Additionally, women with at least a primary education were nearly twice as likely to ensure complete child immunization.

== Female property rights ==
There are unwritten customary norms that subjugate women in many African countries. In their patrilineal system, the Igbo people of Nigeria's south-eastern region pass succession and inheritance rights down to the male progeny. Igbo women are typically not allowed to inherit; however, in some communities, female offspring are allowed to do so under joint tenancy with their brothers. In these situations, the eldest brother still has power over the property. The rights of Nigerian women to inherit property from their deceased parents have been upheld by the Supreme Court. The Igbo customary law that prevents a female child from receiving a share of her deceased father's assets violates Section 42 (1) and (2) of the Nigerian Constitution, a fundamental rights clause that every Nigerian is entitled to. The abuse of women's property rights typically starts in the home and is a reflection of what goes on in society at large. It is typically the closest relatives - the father, brothers, husband, and brothers-in-law - who easily violate women's rights, from the time of birth through adolescence to married life and widowhood. In light of the Supreme Court of Nigeria rulings, it is undeniably actionable at the appropriate court of law for a female to be excluded in the division of the estate of a man who dies intestate.

== Empowering Nigerian women in agriculture ==
In sub-Saharan Africa, the subject of gender disparity in access to economic and productive resources has received considerable attention. Women in Nigeria play significant roles in food production and agriculture; according to reports, women small-scale farmers make up between 70 and 80 percent of the industry's workforce. They are responsible for the majority of domestic food production, processing, marketing, and preservation.

In contrast to their male counterparts, women's access to productive inputs, including better seed types, extension services, and land input is constrained, according to many studies, notably in sub-Saharan Africa. They have limited access to land, credit facilities, training, and advice for farm inputs, technology, and crop insurance, among other things, despite all of their massive contributions to this sector.

About 14% of the land used for farming is owned by women small farm owners, and the government's agricultural sector pays them little attention despite their important responsibilities in food production. According to estimates, women could considerably help accomplish Sustainable Development Goal (SDG) 1(eradicating extreme poverty and hunger), if they had access to capital, land, technology, and training guidance on par with men. USAID says that empowering women to own and manage their land and produce is the first step toward ensuring Nigeria's future food security.

Thousands of women farmers are receiving the tools, information, and resources they need to increase their incomes and the lives of their families and communities thanks to a partnership between Feed the Future and the Nigerian Trade Hub. Gender mainstreaming is recommended in Africa, including Nigeria, for agricultural policies and programs for inclusive financing for food security and sustainable development, as women dominate and play major roles in producing subsistence crops and livestock.

== Challenges ==
- Poor continuity, illiteracy and corruption, among other factors are key challenges facing women's empowerment programs for sustainable development in Nigeria.

== See also ==
- Women in Nigeria
