= HIV/AIDS in Nigeria =

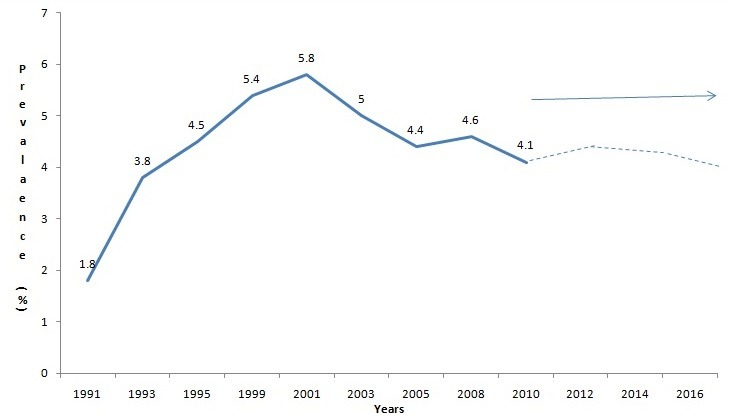
The prevalence of AIDS in Nigeria from 1991 to 2010. Includes predictions up to 2018.

HIV/AIDS in Nigeria was a concern in the 2000s, when an estimated seven million people had HIV/AIDS. In 2008, the HIV prevalence rate among adults aged between 15 and 49 was 3.9 percent. In 2018, the rate among adults aged between 15 and 65 was 1.5 percent. As elsewhere in Africa, women are statistically more likely to have HIV/AIDS. The Nigeria HIV/AIDS Indicator and Impact Survey (NAIIS) was the world's largest and presented statistics which showed the overall numbers were lower than expected. Antiretroviral treatment is available, but people prefer to take the therapy secretly, since there is still noticeable discrimination against people with HIV/AIDS.

== Background ==
Nigeria is emerging from a period of military rule that accounted for almost 28 of the 47 years since independence in 1960. The President's Emergency Plan for AIDS Relief judged that the policy environment is not fully democratized, since civil society was weak during the military era, and its role in advocacy and lobbying remains weak. The size of the population and the nation pose logistical and political challenges particularly due to the political determination of the Nigerian Government to achieve health care equity across geopolitical zones. The necessity to coordinate programs simultaneously at the federal, state and local levels introduces complexity into planning.

The large private sector is largely unregulated and, more importantly, has no formal connection to the public health system where most HIV/AIDS interventions are delivered. Training and human resource development is severely limited in all sectors and will hamper program implementation at all levels. Care and support is limited because existing staff are overstretched and most have insufficient training in key technical areas to provide complete HIV services.

== Prevalence ==
In a 2018 survey, it was estimated that approximately 1.3% of the population was living with HIV, with prevalence highest among people aged 15–49 years. This accounts to 1.9 million Nigerians. While Nigeria aims to end AIDS as a public health threat by 2030, former Nigerian Minister of Health, Dr Osagie Ehanire, said that people living with HIV often live in obscurity.

According to a 2018 survey by the United Nations Office on Drugs and Crime, the prevalence of HIV among Nigerians in prison was 2.8%, as high as that of the general population, with a higher prevalence among female inmates compared to male inmates. The survey also highlights that people who use drugs are susceptible to HIV.

In Nigeria, HIV prevalence is disproportionately high among men who have sex with men (MSM). Although MSM are estimated to constitute approximately 1% of Nigeria’s population, they account for about 20% of people living with HIV in the country. In the gender diverse and sexual minorities community, while much research has not been done in Nigeria, globally and in sub-Saharan Africa, transgender women make up the bulk of the prevalence.

== Treatment ==
In 1987, the Nigerian Government created the National AIDS Control and Prevention Program within the Federal Ministry of Health, a Presidential AIDS Commission composed of ministers from all sectors in 1999 and the National Action Committee on AIDS based in the Office of the Presidency in 2000. The HIV/AIDS Emergency Action Plan developed in 2001, and revised in 2004, serves as the national action framework.

In 2004, seven million people, almost 6 percent of the population, had HIV/AIDS. In 2008, the HIV prevalence rate among adults aged between 15 and 49 was 3.9 percent. Nigeria has the third-largest number of people living with HIV. The HIV epidemic in Nigeria is complex and varies widely by region. In some states, the epidemic is more concentrated and driven by high-risk behaviors, while other states have more generalized epidemics that are sustained primarily by multiple sexual partnerships in the general population.

Youth and young adults in Nigeria are particularly vulnerable to HIV, with young women at higher risk than young men. There are many risk factors that contribute to the spread of HIV, including prostitution, high-risk practices among itinerant workers, high prevalence of sexually transmitted infections, clandestine high-risk heterosexual and homosexual practices, international trafficking of women, and irregular blood screening. It was estimated that 3.4 million people were living with HIV/AIDS, leading the US to spend $400 million annually and the Global Fund to Fight AIDS, Tuberculosis and Malaria $110 million supporting local initiatives.

In 2018, the HIV/AIDS prevalence rate among adults aged between 15 and 64 was 1.5 percent. This was a lower figure than expected. The National Agency for the Control of AIDS (NACA) had instituted a new and more accurate statistics program in 2016. Called the Nigeria HIV/AIDS Indicator and Impact Survey (NAIIS), it was the world's biggest HIV/AIDS survey. It cost $91million and almost 100,000 households were called upon at random, with 250,000 interviewees aged between 15 and 64 years, plus 32,555 children. South South was the zone with the highest prevalence, at 3.1 percent.

In 2018, the prevalence among women aged between 15 and 64 was 1.9 percent, compared to 1.1 percent for men. In 2004, the Joint United Nations Programme on HIV/AIDS recorded that of all Africans aged between 15 and 49 who were HIV-positive, 57 percent were female, and from all Africans aged between 15 and 24, 75 percent were female. In 2001, Nigeria activist Yinka Jegede-Ekpe founded the Nigerian Community of Women Living With HIV/AIDS and serves on the National Action Committee on AIDS. In 2004, she commented that HIV/AIDS would not be eradicated until men and women were treated equally.

In 2007, the President's Emergency Plan for AIDS Relief estimated there were 126,400 people receiving antiretroviral treatment. It provided 4,704,000 condoms for safe sex between 2004 and 2007. A 2006 ethnographic study of how antiretroviral therapy interacted with marriage and sexual reproduction in southeast Nigeria determined that many people taking the drugs were doing so secretly. While there were support groups available, there was still a stigma attached to being HIV-positive and noticeable discrimination against people with HIV/AIDS. When Bisi Alimi announced on a national television show, and later on the BBC World Service that he was gay and HIV-positive, he was arrested and beaten up.

== HIV/AIDS advocacy in Nigeria ==
AHF Nigeria has been working since 2011 across seven states to provide access to services such as antiretroviral therapy (ART). Organisations such as ASHWAN, a national network for women living with HIV, also work to provide HIV prevention, treatment, and psychosocial support. The National HIV and AIDS Strategic Plan 2023–2027 outlines principles and strategic priorities for Nigeria’s HIV response, including ensuring equal access to HIV prevention, treatment, and care for all.

The Initiative for Equal Rights (TIERs) Nigeria runs programmes supporting marginalised communities in Nigeria, with a focus on HIV prevention, mental healthcare, and psychosocial support. In March 2026, they secured ₦2.5 million in compensation in an HIV discrimination case involving an individual who lost their job because of their HIV status.

In January 2026, the Elton John AIDS Foundation spotlighted the Improved Sexual Health and Rights Advocacy Initiative (ISHRAI) as a partner organisation working to protect the rights and wellbeing of LGBTQ+ people in Nigeria. Despite the USAID funding cuts, organisations such as the Center for Population Health Initiative (CPHI) have restarted essential services.

== See also ==
- Health care in Nigeria
- Leopold Zekeng

General:

- HIV/AIDS in Africa
