= Onyinye Ough =

Nigerian activist and author

- Born: Nigeria
- Citizenship: Nigerian
- Occupations: Lawyer, Human rights advocate
- Known for: Advocacy for human rights and gender equality

Onyinye Ough is a Nigerian author, speaker and political activist. She is the executive director of Step up for Social Development and Empowerment in Nigeria, an anti corruption non-governmental organization using storytelling to educate young Nigerians on different types of corruption and its impact on society.

In her book, Emeka's Money, the character Emeka, is depicted as a decent man attempting to do beneficial things for the people around him. He neglects to acknowledge from the start that his "pleasant actions" to his friends can cause harm to the development of his community. The book draws interfaces between various parts of corruption and the real damage they cause. The book has been adapted as an animated short movie.

In July 2019, Onyinye Ough joined other civil society organizations to appeal to the President of Nigeria, Muhammadu Buhari to sign the Federal Audit Service Commission Bill passed by the eighth National Assembly seven months earlier into law.

Onyinye Ough continues to make efforts to develop creative ways to tackle corruption in Nigeria, she created the first virtual reality film to showcase the consequences of corruption in the education sector in Nigeria through the eyes of a schoolgirl.
