= Crispin Adeniyi-Jones =

Medical doctor

Crispin Curtis Adeniyi-Jones (1876–1957) was a Nigerian medical doctor of Sierra Leonean heritage and the pioneer director of the Yaba asylum. He became one of Nigeria's foremost nationalists as a member and later president of the Nigerian National Democratic Party. He was also a long-standing member of the legislative council of Nigeria and served in the council from 1923 to 1938. Apart from his political activities, he also teamed up with Winifred Tete-Ansa of the National Congress of British West Africa to formulate economic policies to alleviate some of the emerging economic problems in colonial West Africa.

== Early life ==
Crispin Adeniyi-Jones was born in Freetown, to Sierra Leone Creole parents. He attended Sierra Leone Grammar School for secondary education and earned his university degrees at the University of Durham and Trinity College Dublin. He started work at Rotunda Hospital, Dublin, and later apprenticed under Sir Rubert Boyce, a notable doctor from the Liverpool School of Tropical Medicine. He left Britain for Nigeria in 1904 and served in the government medical services in Lagos. However, a strategic policy to limit the advancement of African doctors within the medical services and the lack of funds in many departments curtailed some of his initial enthusiasm. Nevertheless, he was appointed the first director of the Yaba Asylum, one of the two asylums in Nigeria at the time. In 1914, he left government services and started a successful private clinic in Lagos.

== Nationalism ==
=== NNDP and the legislative council ===
On 24 June 1923 Adeniyi-Jones, Eric Moore and Egerton Shyngle joined Herbert Macaulay and Thomas Jackson to form the Nigerian National Democratic Party, also known as NNDP. The party capitalised on an initiative to allow elective representation into the legislative council and contested the three seats allowed Africans in Lagos. Adeniyi-Jones won a seat into the council in 1923 and served in the council for about fifteen years. As a member of the legislative council, he took on the mantle of defending the interest of indigenous Africans by engaging in debates with other members on major policy initiatives such as the practice of indirect rule and asking a great many questions about official colonial policy and its benefit to Africans. He sometimes offered strenuous opposition to official colonial policy affecting Nigerians in general. He brought the party's nationalistic initiatives to the public sphere and argued for the merits of traditional norms and customs especially those dealing with the selection of traditional chiefs.

A witness to some of the policies to limit the career of Africans in government service, he promoted the cause of Africans in the civil service and sought increases and advancement of Africans in the service. He also advocated the creation of more primary schools, reduction of regional inequality in cocoa grading and the abolition of many provincial courts.

=== Experiments in economic development ===
Adeniyi-Jones played an important role as a financier and president of a few companies formed in the late 1920s and 1930s. He was president of the Nigeria Mercantile Bank and was a major financier of the West African Co-operative Producers Limited. Both companies were part of an ambitious economic program, to create an elevated standing for indigenous Africans within the British Empire. Prior to the twentieth century, the major economic activity of indigenous Nigerian groups where largely sheltered from the global economy. But with emergence of a colonial economic system in West Africa, problems affecting African producers began to emerge. A major plan of action to contain and eliminate the problems was made by Winifried Tete-Ansa, a Krobo man from the National Congress of British West Africa, a major political party in Ghana. He was a man well versed in the rudiments of the global economic institutions. The plan of action was to create African co-operatives to become commanding business institutions in colonial Africa. Some of the companies founded were the West African Co-operative Producers, partly financed by Adeniyi-Jones and the Nigeria Mercantile bank chaired by Adeniyi-Jones. Both ventures failed to reach the founders dream but laid a strong foundation for other ventures. Akinola Maja, T.A. Doherty and H.A. Subair, all directors of the bank later left to form the National bank of Nigeria, the first successful indigenous bank in British West Africa.
