= Stella Ifeanyi Smith =

Nigerian molecular biologist and biotechnologist

Director of Research, Nigeria Institute of Medical Research
- Incumbent
- Assumed office 2013

Personal details
- Born: Stella Ifeanyi Ebigwei; 28 January 1965 (age 61) Lagos, Nigeria
- Education: University of Ilorin (Bachelor of Science in Microbiology); University of Lagos (Master of Science in Medical Microbiology and Parasitology); University of Lagos (Doctor of Philosophy in Medical microbiology)

Stella Ifeanyi Smith is a Nigerian medical scientist with interests in molecular biology and biotechnology. Smith joined Nigeria Institute of Medical Research in 1988, and was made director of research in 2013. She was elected a Fellow of the African Academy of Sciences in 2022.

== Personal life and education ==
Born January 28, 1965, Smith had her first degree in microbiology from University of Ilorin in 1986. Thereafter, she obtained a master's degree in Medical microbiology from University of Lagos. She completed her doctorate degree from the same institution in 1996.

== Publications ==
In 2001, she conducted a study on 459 diarrhoeal patients in Lagos. The patients were described as isolates from Shigella spp. and Escherichia coli. From her findings, she recommended that ampicillin, tetracycline, co-trimoxazole, and streptomycin should be avoided in the first stage treatment of shigellosis as the properties and resistance level of its effect from the study were of concern. She identified Nalidixic acid, ciprofloxacin and ofloxacin as safer alternatives.

Her most cited work in Google Scholar was done in 2006, where she examined the antibacterial effect of edible plant extract on escherichia coli 0157:H7. In her work, four different plants (Entada africana (bark), Terminalia avicennoides (bark), Mitragyna stipulosa (bark) Lannae acida (stem bark)) were examined with ethanol and aqueous extract using agar diffusion method for their reaction to ten strains of E. coli 0157:H7 (EHEC). The results varied depending on the combination used for the test.
