= 1928 Nigerian general election =

General elections were held in Nigeria on 28 September 1928. The Nigerian National Democratic Party (NNDP) won three of the four elected seats in the Legislative Council.

== Electoral system ==
The 1922 Nigeria (Legislative Council) Order in Council provided for a 46-member Legislative Council, of which 23 were ex-officio officials, four were nominated officials, up to 15 were appointed unofficial members and four were elected (three in Lagos and one in Calabar). The 23 ex-officio officials included the Governor, the Chief Secretary and their deputy, the Lieutenant Governors and secretaries of the Northern and Southern Provinces, the Attorney General, the Commandant of the Nigerian Regiment, the Director of Medical Services, the Treasurer, the Director of Marine, the Comptroller of Customs, the Secretary of Native Affairs, together with ten senior residents.

The franchise was restricted to men aged 21 or over who were British subjects or a native of Nigeria who had lived in their municipal area for the 12 months prior to the election, and who earned at least £100 in the previous calendar year. The right to vote was withheld from those who had been convicted of a crime and sentenced to death, hard labour or prison for more than a year, or were of "unsound mind". Only 3,011 people registered to vote in Lagos and 500–600 in Calabar.

All eligible voters could also run as candidates unless they had an undischarged bankruptcy, had received charitable relief in the previous five years or were a public servant. Candidates were required to obtain the nomination of at least three registered voters and pay a £10 deposit. The term of the council was five years.

== Campaign ==
Five candidates contested the three Lagos seats, of which three were from the NNDP; Crispin Adeniyi-Jones and Eric Moore, who were incumbent members, having been elected in the 1923 elections, as well as the barrister and businessman T. A. Doherty. The other candidates were J. B. Benjamin, an engineer, and E. M. E Agbegi, a barrister, both of whom ran as independents. In Calabar C. W. Clinton of the Calabar Ratepayers' Association was the only candidate, and was elected unopposed.

== Results ==
Party	Votes	%	Seats	+/–
Nigerian National Democratic Party	2,606	86.46	3	0
Calabar Ratepayers' Association			1	New
Independents	408	13.54	0	–1
Total	3,014	100.00	4	0
Source: Tamuno

=== By constituency ===
Lagos (three members)
Candidate	Party	Votes	%	Notes
Crispin Adeniyi-Jones	Nigerian National Democratic Party	888	29.46	Elected
Eric Moore	Nigerian National Democratic Party	883	29.30	Elected
T. A. Doherty	Nigerian National Democratic Party	835	27.70	Elected
J.B. Benjamin	Independent	215	7.13	
E.M.E. Agbegi	Independent	193	6.40	
Total		3,014	100.00	
Registered voters/turnout		3,011	–	
Source: Tamuno

=== List of members ===
Governor Graeme Thomson appointed 14 unofficial members to the Legislative Council, of which seven were Europeans and seven Africans (an increase from six Africans in the 1923 elections). The seven Europeans represented commercial interests, with three representing the banking, mining and shipping sectors, and four representing commercial interests of Calabar, Kano, Lagos and Port Harcourt. The seven Africans represented African Traders, the Colony of Lagos, Oyo Province, Rivers district, the Egba and the Ibo, as well as one seat representing the cities of Benin and Warri.

The only new appointees were I T Palmer, who held the new Benin-Warri seat, and L White, who replaced J B Jones as the Port Harcourt representative.

Constituency	Member
Elected members
Calabar	C. W. Clinton
Lagos	Crispin Adeniyi-Jones
Lagos	T. A. Doherty
Lagos	Eric Moore
Nominated African members
African Traders	S.C. Obianwu
Benin & Warri	I.T. Palmer
Colony	Kitoye Ajasa
Egba	S.H. Pearse
Ibo	I.O. Mba
Oyo Province	E.H. Oke
Rivers district	M. Pepple-Jaja
Nominated commercial members
Banking	L.M. Herepath (Barclays)
Mining	A.L. Butler
Shipping	H.S. Feggetter
Calabar	G. Graham Paul
Kano	J.W. Speer
Lagos	R.F. Irving
Port Harcourt	L. White
Source: Wheare

== Aftermath ==
During the term of the Legislative Council several members were replaced; A S Agbaje became the appointed member for Oyo Province on 30 January 1930, T Hepburn became the commercial member for Kano on 23 June 1930 and G T Basden became the appointed member for the Ibo on 28 January 1933.
