= Onokoro Nwoti =

Nigerian merchant and politician

Onokoro Nwa Enyi Nwoti

Personal details
- Born: Aku
- Occupation: Politician

Onokoro Nwa Enyi Nwoti was born in northern Igboland in Nigeria. She was born sometime around 1903 though the exact date is not documented. During her long life she became a “merchant queen” holding much power and influence in the marketplace. She also was politically influential as a member of National Council of Nigeria and the Cameroons and a leader for women in the nationalist movement. Her date of death is unknown but as of 1998, Madam Nwoti was still engaging in trade, albeit in a different form than in earlier periods.

== Biography ==
Onokoro Nwa Enyi Nwoti was born in Aku, northern Igboland, Nigeria in the early 1900s. She was an apprentice to a trader at a young age allowing her to learn the skills necessary for working the marketplace. After she completed her apprenticeship she became a trader of kola nuts. She would carry baskets of kola nuts to Igala market where she bought bags of beans, peppers, melons, and smoked meat which she resold at Aku market. She became successful as a trader earning the title of “Mama Oji,” or “kola nut mother”.

In the 1920s and 30s she expanded her trade to palm oil and kernels, and became the first woman from the Nsukka area to join this circle of trade. For security, she often traveled with other traders in groups. In Onitsha, Onokoro Nwoti sold woven cloths and foods, and in return, bought tobacco, potash, gunpowder, horses and elephant tusks.

Nwoti was also involved in polities, and she had influence in her social and economic spheres, and was able to rally nationalists to her cause. In the 1950s, Onokoro was a member of the National Council of Nigeria and the Cameroons.

Nwoti reduced her long-distance travel for trade in her mid-nineties, but continued buying and selling kola nuts in nearby markets, and she was trading as late as 1998.
