= Theophilus Adebayo Doherty =

Nigerian businessman and politician

Chief Theophilus Adebayo Doherty (24 February 1895 – 18 November 1974) was a Nigerian businessman and politician. He was a distinguished Nigerian lawyer, who played a pivotal role in the early nationalist movement and the country’s economic development. He was a leading pioneer of the founding of the Nigerian Exchange Group and one of the first indigenous banks in Nigeria, the National Bank of Nigeria. He was also a key figure in the fight for the creation of Lagos State.

== Early life and education ==
Adebayo Doherty was born to the family of the prominent philanthropist and 'Merchant Prince of Alakoro', J. H. Doherty in 1895. He grew up with his family in Lagos where he attended primary and secondary schools. He attended C.M.S. Grammar School, Lagos, from 1910 to 1912 and thereafter, King's College, Lagos from 1913 to 1916. After his secondary education, he proceeded to the London School of Economics and at the Middle Temple being called to the Bar on April 20, 1921.

== Politics ==
A member of the Nigerian National Democratic Party (NNDP), Doherty was elected to the Legislative Council representing Lagos in 1928, and was re-elected in 1933. He did not contest the 1938 elections.

== National Bank of Nigeria ==
In 1933, he founded the National Bank of Nigeria alongside Dr. Akinola Maja. Traders such as Adetunji Lardner Johnson and Adio Adesigbin were also involved and Hamzat Adeniyi Subair, later served as General Manager of the bank, a position he held until 1951. In its early years, the bank’s operations were fairly modest, but they gradually expanded as it attracted new depositors and, importantly, new shareholders such as the wealthy import merchant M. Bank-Anthony and N. Azikiwe in 1938. Efforts were also made to engage in direct trade with Europe and the United States, thereby circumventing European trading firms. Although the bank proved relatively long-lasting, its activities remained limited for many years. Its primary role was to supply short-term credit to African importers, exporters, produce buyers, and traders.

He also became a prominent member of the Nigerian Association of African Importers and Exporters, an association designed to link African traders who depend on foreign firms for goods with overseas trading houses and also act as an African Chamber of Commerce.

== Business and Finance ==
He became a prominent member of the Nigerian Association of African Importers and Exporters, an association designed to link African traders who depend on foreign firms for goods with overseas trading houses and also act as an African Chamber of Commerce.

In the 1940s, the association was a leading indigenous elite business group that negotiated trading concessions with the colonial government. He was also the founder of West African Pictures Limited, the Nigerian General Insurance Company and the Nigerian Medicines Stores. Also known as T.A Doherty, he was also the president and sole funder of the Lagos citizens protection council which was instrumental in the fight for the creation of Lagos state. He lived at Debayo House, Odunlanmi Street, Lagos Island.

== The Nigerian Stock Exchange ==
The Nigerian Exchange Group (NGX Group), formerly known as the Nigerian Stock Exchange, traces its origins to 15 September 1960 with the establishment of the Lagos Stock Exchange. The Memorandum of Association of the NGX Group was subscribed to by seven founding members, of which was led by Theophilus Adebayo Doherty.

== Legal standing and victory for Indigenous Nigerian banks ==
The Federal Government of Nigeria passed the Commissions of Inquiry Act 1961, specifically to investigate the affairs of the National Bank of Nigeria. In February 1962, the situation initially drew little attention, with many questioning its significance. However, some leaders viewed the move as a threat to personal freedoms. The matter was taken to court, where the judges ultimately declared the law invalid. The case, Doherty v. Balewa, went to the Federal Supreme Court in Lagos.

This outcome marked a victory for Senator Chief Theophilus Adebayo Doherty, the Founder and Managing Director of the National Bank, who challenged the government’s attempt to probe the institution. The court ruled in his favor, bringing a sense of relief and celebration among his supporters. The landmark case is often referred to as "The Case that Rocked Nigeria."

== Death and legacy ==
Adebayo Doherty died in 1974. Among his descendants, prominent figures still embody his commitment in education, business and finance. His grandchildren includes Ola Debayo-Doherty, appointed as the first African CEO of Mandila's Group from Ibile Oil and Gas Corporation.

== See also ==
- List of Nigerians
- Nigerian Exchange Group
- Timeline of Lagos
