= Oluwatoyin Taiwo =

Nigerian politician and public administrator

Hon. Oluwatoyin Taiwo

Chief of Staff to the Governor of Ogun State
- Incumbent
- Assumed office December 2024
- Governor: Dapo Abiodun

Personal details
- Education: Obafemi Awolowo University
- Occupation: Politician, public administrator

Oluwatoyin Taiwo is a Nigerian politician and public administrator. Since December 2024, he has served as Chief of Staff to the Governor of Ogun State, Dapo Abiodun.

== Education ==
Taiwo studied Statistics at Obafemi Awolowo University, where he obtained a Bachelor of Science degree. He later pursued postgraduate studies, earning both a master's degree and a doctorate (PhD).

== Career ==
Taiwo previously served as Commissioner for Culture and Tourism during Governor Abiodun's first term. He was later appointed Deputy Chief of Staff to the governor.

In December 2024, he was confirmed as Chief of Staff to the Governor of Ogun State, a position he continues to hold.
