= Female child labour in Nigeria =

Female child labour in Nigeria refers to the high incidence in Nigeria of girls aged 5–14 who are involved in economic activities outside education and leisure. The prevalence of female child labour in Nigeria is largely due to household economic status, but other factors include the educational status of parents, the presence of peer pressure, and high societal demand for domestic help and sex workers. Additionally, in many rural and Muslim communities in Northern Nigeria, children are sometimes asked to aid religiously secluded women or mothers in running errands.

Many girls in the nation work as shop helpers and street hawkers. The use of young girls in economic activities exposes them to dangers that sometimes result in sexual assault, loneliness, anger, and exploitation. In addition, the labour of young girls is not legally recognized and any employee benefit are negligible.

In Nigeria, child labour is driven by social, demographic, and economic factors such as poverty, loss of parental employment, loss of a parent or family guardian, rural-urban migration, large family size, and cultural norms such as polygamy. Other drivers include the mal-distribution of schools, poor accessibility, and the high cost of tuition. Recently, conflicts and terrorism have caused internal displacement of people and damage to school infrastructure, pushing more children into child labour. Moreover, the mass killings of communities by bandits in northern Nigeria have created more orphans and potential victims of child labour.

== Background ==
Starting in the mid-1980s, adverse economic conditions in Nigeria (a country where men constituted the majority of the employees in the formal sector) forced many women to engage in informal sector labour in addition to their domestic duties, in order to supplement household income. Strategies undertaken by women in this informal sector include working long hours in the markets and using their children to hawk goods on the streets. In addition to missing classes, many girls face health and safety risks including exhaustion, attempted sexual assault, and kidnapping.

Since the beginning of the Structural Adjustment Programme in Nigeria, Nigeria has gone through a period of economic hardship where families have had to improvise new strategies to survive, which sometimes included child trafficking and sending children to the cities as house girls. In 2003, the country enacted the Child Rights Act to protect children from being exploited and denied their rights as minors.

In rural communities, girl child labour is believed to aid girls in developing home skills, helping others, and building family solidarity. One example of such an activity is gathering firewood. Socialization is a major reason girls are preferred to boys in the recruitment of maids. However, this type of work may impede educational prospects for girls. In some Northern Nigerian Fulani communities, girls help their mothers by hawking milk or other produce from their family farm.

== Forms of work ==
=== Domestic help ===
Due to the division of labor according to gender in households and related socialization norms, many Nigerian households prefer to use girls as maids. Domestic help is typically performed by girls aged under 15 who work as maids in the households of families who are in a higher income bracket. In return, the wealthier family pays the girl or her parents, or provides her education or skills training. However, the child may face abuse and sexual assault from the household. In some instances, some of the girls are under the age of 8. In Nigeria, most of the girls are from the Southern and Middle Belt regions. The demand for domestic help in Nigeria and nearby African countries has increased the incidence of child trafficking.

Organized networks procure child labor in the Southern states including Rivers, Akwa Ibom, Imo, Cross River, Ekiti, and Oyo. The children are then transported to other states for domestic work.

=== Street hawking ===
Many girls below the age of 15 vend goods on public roads, carry goods to customers, or beg for alms. On average, more primary and secondary school-age girls engage in street trading than boys. Apart from hawking, some girls also engage in street begging, sometimes known as al majeri in the North.

== Problems ==
About 8% of girl hawkers have been subjected to sexual abuse including cases of rape and sexual violence. Young girls are also exposed to adult challenges and deviant behavior at an early age while having no time to attend classes and complete school work.

Apart from exposure to health risks, child abuse, and sexual assault, girl child labor in Nigeria has led to an increase in adolescent-age commercial sex work exposing the girls to the dangers of street life at an early age. Some young girls are trafficked by organized networks who lie to the girls and their parents that they will be housemaids in the city.

== See also ==
- Child marriage in Nigeria
- Women in Nigeria

== Sources ==
- Omokhodion, J (September 2009). "Linking the Dominance of House Girls in Nigerian Households to the Girl child Socialization Pattern in Nigeria". Journal of Social Sciences. 1 (2).
