= Child labour in Nigeria =

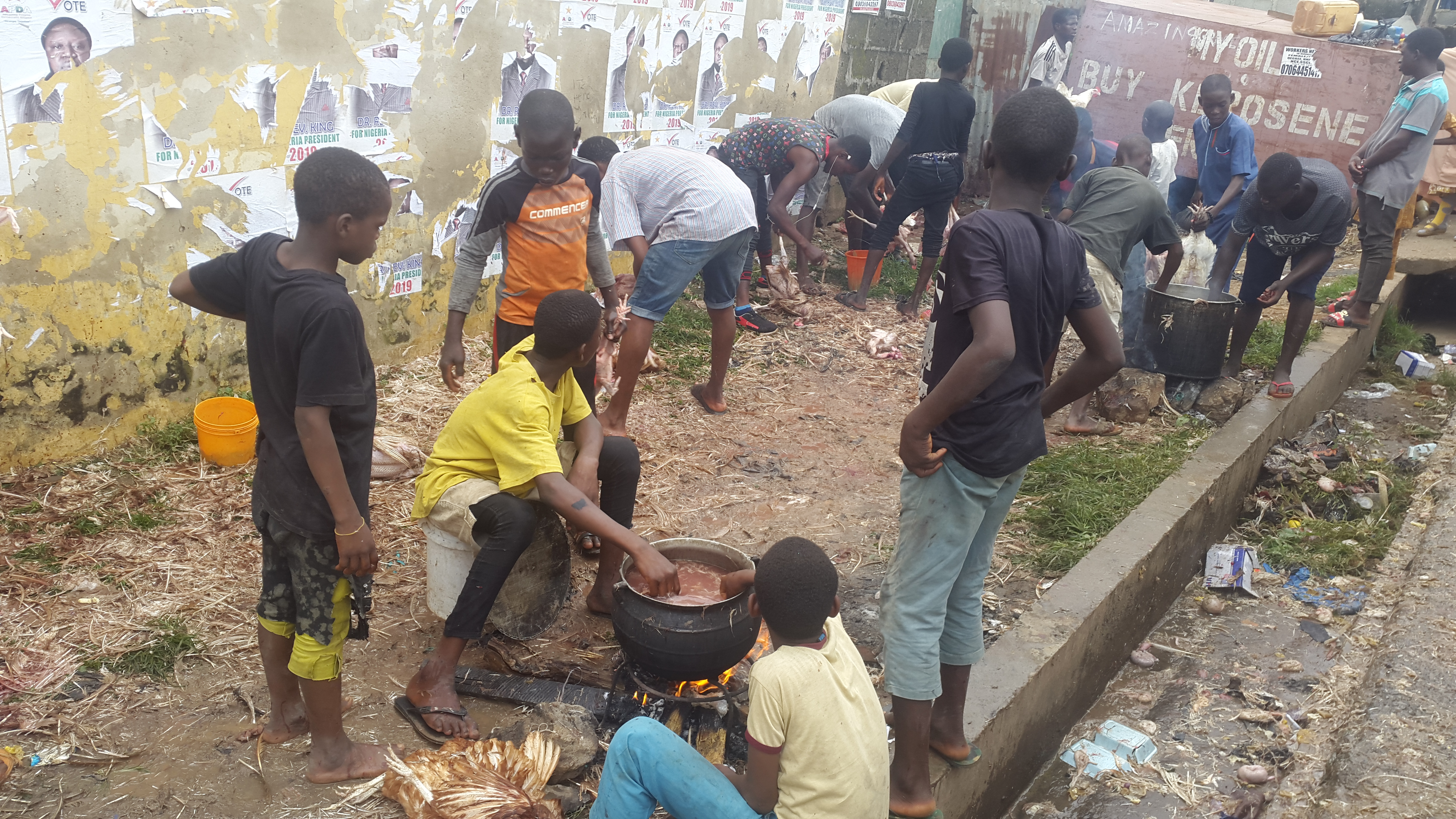
Child labour in Nigeria

Child labour in Nigeria is the employment of children under the age of 18 in a manner that restricts or prevents them from basic education and development. Child labour is pervasive in every state of the country. In 2006, the number of child workers was estimated at 15 million. Poverty is a major factor that drives child labour in Nigeria. In poor families, child labour is a major source of income for the family.Nigeria has over 62.9 million children aged 5-17, making up 30.3% of the population, according to data from the NCFLS, which surveyed 16,418 households nationwide.

About 6 million of Nigeria's children do not go to school at all. In the current conditions, these children do not have the time, energy or resources to go to school. Domestic servants were the least visible form of child labour, and often sexually harassed. Amongst informal economy and public places, street vending employed 64%. Midst informal enterprises in semipublic places, children were often observed as mechanics and bus conductors.

== Current status ==
UNICEF Nigeria is active for children's rights. Child workers include street vendors, shoe shiners, apprentice mechanics, carpenters, vulcanisers, tailors, barbers and domestic servants. Many working children are exposed to dangerous and unhealthy environments. In August, 2003, the Nigerian government formally adopted three International Labour Organization conventions setting a minimum age for the employment of children. The government also has implemented West African Cocoa Agriculture Project (WACAP). There is a similar incidence of child labour in rural and urban Nigeria.

The US Department of Labour in its 2010 report claims Nigeria is witnessing the worst forms of child labor, particularly in agriculture and domestic service. In rural areas, most children work in agriculture of products such as cassava, cocoa and tobacco. These children typically work long hours and for little pay, with their families. The report claims some children are exposed to pesticides and chemical fertilizers in cocoa and tobacco fields because of archaic farming practices or because they are deployed as forced labour without protective gear. Additionally, street children work as porters and scavengers, and a growing number of them engage in begging. The report claims commercial sexual exploitation of children, especially girls, is also occurring in some Nigerian cities, including Port Harcourt and Lagos.

Boys make up most of the children who work, but girls are less likely to go to school and tend to work for longer hours than boys.

== Trafficking ==
There is trafficking of children in Nigeria. Child labour is more common among children of illiterates. On average, in the Southwestern zone of Nigeria, there is a higher work burden for working children. Boys tend to earn more. Girls' non-participation in schooling is more likely affected by parents' lack of interest than boys'. Non-participation in school is related to poverty. About one third of working children obtain no benefit from their employer. Child labour among pupils frequently impairs schooling.

== See also ==
- Child labour in Africa
- Child sexual abuse in Nigeria
- Slavery in modern Africa
