= Brazilian Nigerians =

Brazilians who migrated to Nigeria

Brazilian Nigerians Amarôs Agudá
- (Brazil) (Nigeria)
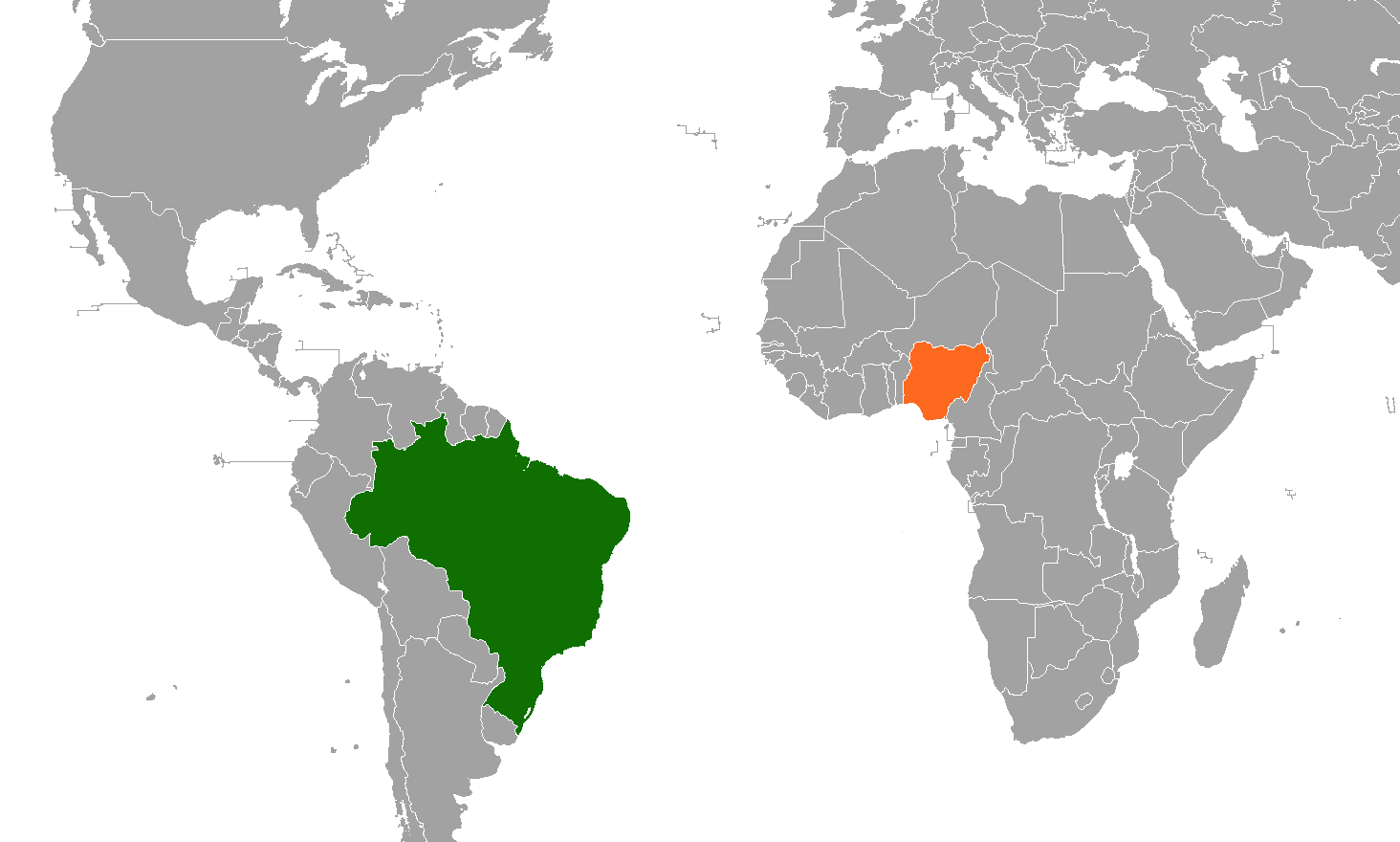

Regions with significant populations
- Lagos, Abeokuta, Ibadan, Onitsha, Calabar, Port Harcourt, Warri, Abuja and Jos.

Languages
- English · Languages of Nigeria · Portuguese

Religion
- Predominantly: Roman Catholicism (80%) Minority: Protestantism(2-3%) · Islam(15%) · Afro-Brazilian Religions(1.5-3%)

Related ethnic groups
- Tabom people • Afro-Brazilian • Americo-Liberian • Saro people • Sierra Leone Creole people • Brazilian diaspora • Yorubas • Igbos

Brazilian Nigerians, Amarôs or Agudás consist of the descendants of Afro-Brazilians who left Brazil and settled in Benin, Togo and Nigeria. In Ghana, they established themselves mostly in Accra and formed a separate, related group, called the Tabom.

Starting from the 1830s, many emancipated Africans who had been through forced labour and discrimination in Brazil began moving back to the area of the former Slave Coast of West Africa, in the case of Nigeria mainly in the area of Lagos, bringing along with them some cultural and social sensibilities adapted during their sojourn in Brazil. These emancipated Africans were often called "Aguda" or "Amaro"; it is said that in many cases they also integrated returnees from Cuba.

The term "Brazilian Nigerians" can also refer today to any person holding both Brazilian and Nigerian nationalities, and sometimes to Brazilian citizens in Nigeria in general or first generation expatriates from Brazil. As of today, there are fewer than 200 Brazilian citizens registered within the consulate in Nigeria.

== History ==
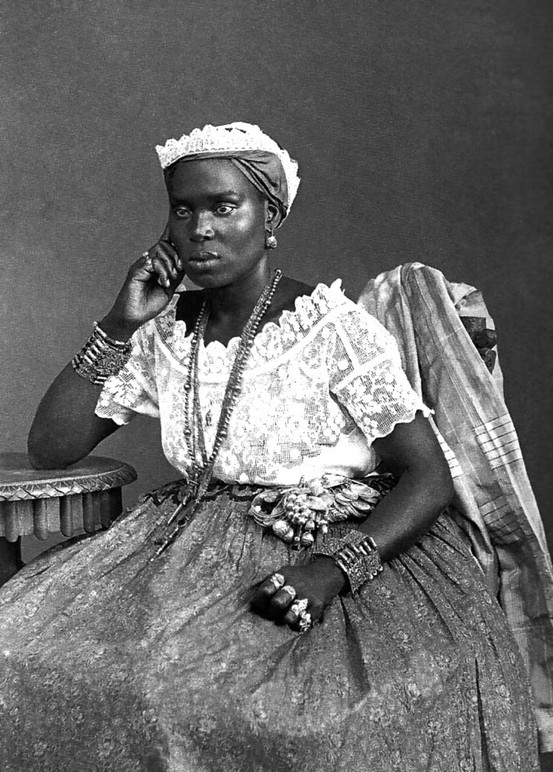
Bahia woman, 1885

At the height of the Transatlantic slave trade in West Africa, many prisoners of war or those kidnapped for sale in slave markets were sold to Europeans and transported across the Atlantic. Estimates of the number of slaves from the Gulf of Guinea to Brazil totaled about 300,000 in the nineteenth century. The captives disembarked in Bahia before moving further south to work on plantations, assist tradesmen or hawk goods for white Brazilians. As some gained manumission, earned savings or got deported as a result of racism, waves of African migration back to the West African coast developed. By the middle of the nineteenth century, an Afro-Brazilian community had begun to emerge along the West African coast, developed by descendants of slaves who had twice crossed the Atlantic. These Africans brought back Afro-Brazilian sensibilities in food, agriculture, architecture and religion.

The first recorded repatriation of African people from Brazil to what is now Nigeria was a government-led deportation in 1835 in the aftermath of a Yoruba and Hausa rebellion in the city of Salvador known as the Malê Revolt. After the rebellion, the Brazilian government - fearful of further insurrection - allowed freed or manumitted Africans the option to return home or keep paying an exorbitant tax to the government. A few Africans who were free and had saved some money were able to return to Africa as a result of the tough conditions, taxation, racism and homesickness. In 1851, 60 Mina Africans put together $4,000 to charter a ship for Badagry.

After slavery was abolished in Cuba and Brazil in 1886 and 1888 respectively, further migration to Lagos continued. Many of the returnees chose to return to Nigeria for cultural, missionary and economic reasons. Many of them descended from the Yoruba. In Lagos, they were given the watery terrains of Popo Aguda as their settlement. By the 1880s, they comprised about 9% of the population of Lagos. Towards the end of 1920, the migration stopped.

Though coastal Lagos was the preferred destination, most of the returnees were descendants of groups such as Ijeshas, Oyos, Ijebus and Egbas based in the interior. The Agudas were aware of their home cities but preferred to set up shop in Lagos because it was conducive for trade, they were warmly received in Badagry and also because of on-going wars in the interior. A ship with Agudas docking in Badagry would be welcomed by crowds of children hailing them as they disembarked from the ship, whereas in the hinterlands strangers were viewed with suspicion. In some cases, the Oba of Lagos gave them land to build a house and provided men to assist them in their transition to local life. This notwithstanding, Lagos was different from Bahia. The elder returnees were comfortable, but many of the children were foreign to Lagos. They held on to elements of Bahia culture such as Catholicism and formed a close knit community within Lagos Island. Because of the retention of Catholicism and Western dressing, indigenous Africans called them "black whites" or Agudas. Keen on acquiring wealth in Africa, some of the earliest Agudas were morally ambivalent on issues such as slavery and became slave traders themselves,such as the descendants of Francisco Felix de Sousa and Domingo Martinez.

=== Settlement ===
When Agudas arrived from Bahia and Pernambuco, they took up residence on the Eastern parts of Lagos on land provided by Oba Ojulari. In 1852, this region was demarcated as the Brazilian quarters (what later came to be known as Popo Aguda). During this time, metropolitan Lagos followed the racial and cultural characteristics evident in the city. The Saros lived in Olowogbowo, a tract of land on the Western corner of Lagos Island, Europeans lived and traded along the long stretch of the Marina and indigenous Lagosians lived on the Northwestern areas of the island. The westernmost corner of Brazilian quarters reached the easternmost parts of Olowogbowo at Tinubu Square, while the center of the Brazilian area was Campos Square - named after Cuban returnee Hilario Campos. Other major streets include Bamgbose and Tokunboh. Within the quarters diasporic sensibilities were evident, the community lacked signs of ethnic grouping, and fluidity was present in the religious practices of the residents.

Popo Aguda was also a commercial center of trade, serving as a distribution center for imported goods. Its chief, the Onipopo, today presides over various ceremonies of remembrance that take place in the quarters. A sister community of Brazilians also exists in Ago Egba, the Egba colony in Lagos, which is located on the mainland in Ebute Metta.

== Culture ==
Returnees from Brazil and their present-day descendants were and are more commonly called "Agudas" (from agudão, a non-standard Portuguese word for cotton properly rendered as algodão) or "Amaro". Most were Catholics, but some worshiped African Orishas which they brought from Brazil. Some of the Agudas are also Muslims. Most of them still have Portuguese names. Some common Portuguese family names in Nigeria include Pinheiro, Lopez, Da Silveira, De Silva, De Souza, and Moreira. In the 1800s, the major distinguishing set of classification was by birth, Agudas taken captive from West Africa who emigrated back to Lagos were called Papae or Mamae and those who were born in Brazil and then returned were called Yaya or Yayo.

The British annexation of Lagos in 1861 and the promotion of trade benefited the Brazilian community. Along with the Saros, they became a rising bourgeoisie. They utilized a western style of dressing, owned race horses and organized waltzes, square dances and musical soirees where Molière was performed. However, with time many began to embrace their heritage and when the children of the returnees were grown, they came to embrace Lagos as their home. The annexation of Lagos that led to the rise of this wealthy class also came with the realisation that the colonists were not leaving soon and any hope of forming a political class was dim. The Brazilians began to cultivate relationships with the traditional authorities in Lagos, while some renewed relationships with Africans in the hinterland by supplying them with weapons. Agudas supplied weapons to the Ijeshas in the war against Ibadan. Beginning in the 1880s, many began to change their names to African ones while the Aurora Relief Society was formed to research their culture. Agudas' cuisine in the early 1920s included food considered African in Bahia but considered different from those eaten by indigenes on the Island. They ate pirão de caranguejo during holidays and prepared mungunzá, mingau (porridge) and feijão-de-leite (coconut milk beans) as food staples. In agriculture, the returnees also popularized the use of Cassava as a food crop.

Agudas celebrated Easter with the coming out of Caretas or masked figures, burrinha at Epiphany and Nosso Senhor do Bonfim (Our Lord of the Good End) associated with Obatala was celebrated during yuletide. Connected to Fanti Carnival, it is a historic cultural festival held annually on Lagos Island, Nigeria. It elebrates the city's unique Afro-Brazilian heritage, rooted in the return of formerly enslaved Africans from Brazil and Cuba in the 19th century.

Popo Aguda was a close-knit community and residents were known for their thriftiness and a strong work ethic.

== Religion ==
A majority of the Agudas were Catholics, but the community had a significant number of Muslim families and those who still adhered to the traditional religion. Religious differences were not as important nor divisive as they were to indigenous Africans, and they were comfortable marrying from any of the three religions. Prior to the construction of a pro-cathedral, mass was performed in a bamboo building on Broad St, the plot of land where St Mary Convent was later built on. The first priest was Padre Anthonio, he was in charge of the Catholic church before the coming of French missionaries. The practice of baptism was important to the local community and it was also a way to enter the Aguda community.

A cathedral, the Holy Cross Pro-Cathedral was completed in 1881, financed by funds from the lay congregation. It was designed to be the most significant structure in Lagos colony when completed. Originally built with one tower, a few years later another tower was added with the structure forming a cruciform structure with two towers. The Church was built by Agudas, but its construction was supervised by French missionaries. Among the builders were the quartet of Francisco Nobre (built one of the towers), Balthazar dos Reis, João da Costa and Lázaro Borges da Silva (master bricklayer) along with their apprentices. This group also built the old Central Mosque, called Jamiu Central Mosque.

== Trade ==
Trade between Lagos and Brazil rose in the 1860s and in 1869, Brazil was the third largest exporter to Lagos, very much behind Britain but ahead of France. Returnees in Lagos dominated the trade with Brazil and sold cotton, traditional artifacts and kola-nuts to Africans in Bahia. However, this Transatlantic trade gradually declined and by the beginning of the Twentieth century it was virtually non existent. They had pioneered trade with Brazil in the mid nineteenth century but by the 1880s, ruinous competitors and an economic downturn had forced many to abandon the export trade. Agriculture soon became an avenue to supplement shortfalls in economic activity. Before the downturn, many traders had acquired wealth and became prominent families within the community in Lagos. Such patriarchs included Angelo Campos, Esan da Rocha and Joaquim Branco (originally settled in Dahomey) who were able to sponsor their children for further education in Bahia, Havana or Europe. In Bahia, Afro-Brazilians formed the bulk of skilled labor, Aguda returnees brought along trade skills mastered in Bahia and preferred to teach their children a trade or handicraft such as masonry, carpentry or tailoring. Some worked as clerks for the European trading companies. In 1897, of the 96 qualified Aguda artisans listed in a directory, 11 were bricklayers and builders, 6 were cabinet makers, 9 tailors, 21 carpenters, 17 clerks and 24 traders. The leading dressmaker in Victorian Lagos was Yaya Clemencia Guinaries.

The Brazilians who engaged in trading of goods also had the benefit of using their connection to their home cities to bypass traditional channels of trade by opening direct routes from Lagos to the interior and ignoring the traditional market cities and middlemen. Apart from trading in goods, investment in properties was also common among the wealthier families.

== Architecture ==
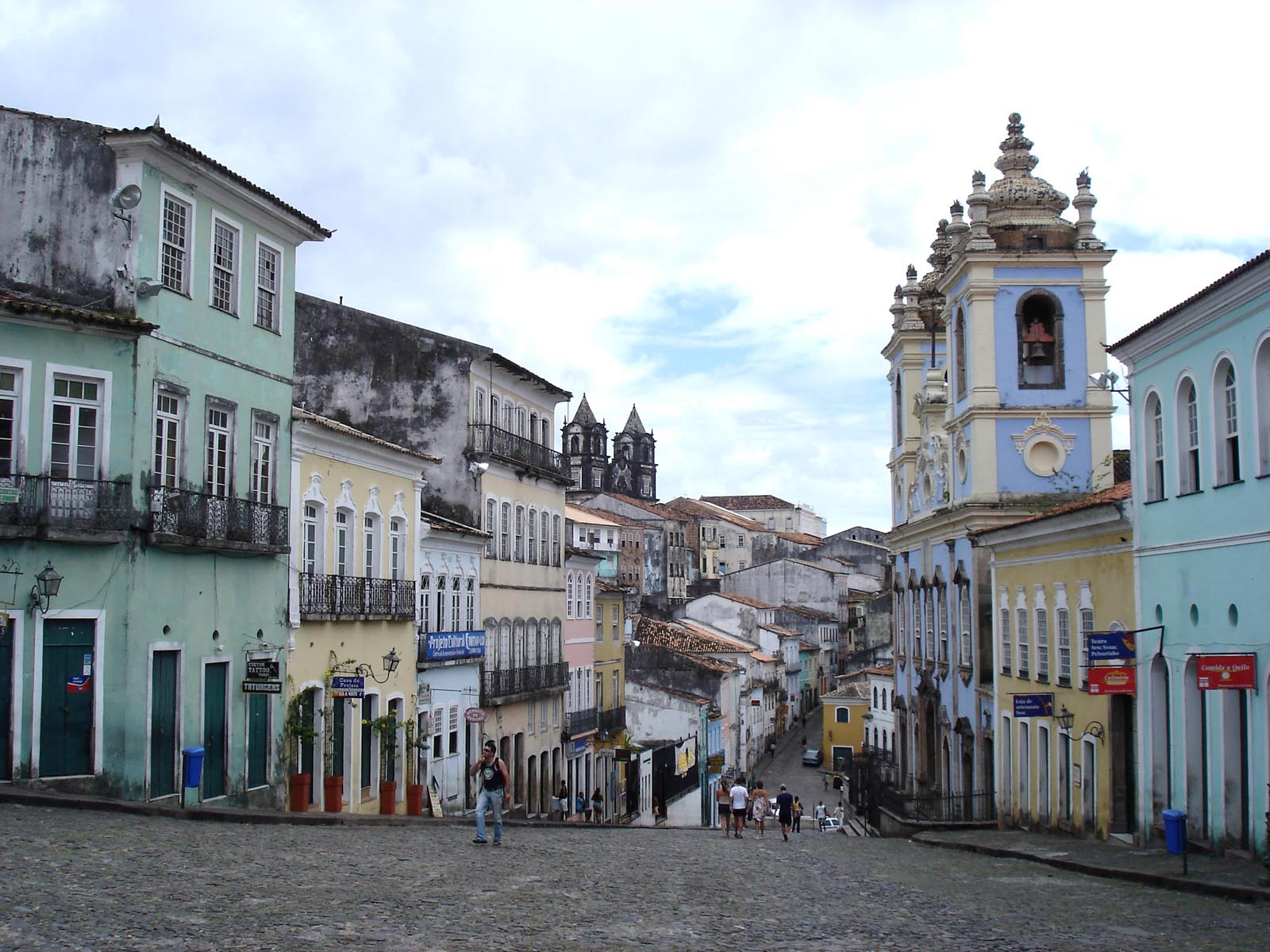
Baroque style, Bahia

Brazilian architecture in Nigeria is a legacy of the thousands of freed slaves who returned to Nigeria in the 19th century. Trained as carpenters, cabinetmakers, masons and bricklayers in Brazil, the ex-slaves were notably technically skilled artisans and were known for their exuberant and individualistic style on doorways, brightly painted facades and chunky concrete columns which are rooted in the baroque styles popular in Brazil in the 18th century.

In early 1800s Lagos, the dominant architectural style was mud houses and houses with stilt using thatched leaves as roofing; these houses were usually divided into compartments to hold the extended family. The residences of the Oba and chiefs were much bigger, they had large courtyards, pillars and arches, a mixture of European and indigenous styles. The European influence took root during the reign of Oba Akinsemoyin who invited Portuguese slavers to Lagos,and the slavers in return renovated his palace using imported bricks from Portugal for the structure and roofing slates. In the 1830s, the migration of emancipated returnees began to change the architectural style. Influenced by the symmetrical plans of the Brazilian colonial house, they introduced a new architectural style to Lagos that was soon embraced by wealthy traders. The Brazilian style of architecture became dominant in Lagos Island by the end of the 19th century. The structures were one storey houses built for middle class residents and others were two or three storeys stuccoed buildings (sobrados) built for wealthier clients. The detached storey buildings conferred prestige on the owners. They were built with shuttered windows, had spaces between the top of the wall and the roof and with a compound. A ground floor usually opens to the street and was sometimes used as a storage, store or housing the domestic help. The houses were built for a nuclear family in contrast to the extended family structure of early Yoruba architecture.

This style was prominent in old Lagos during the late nineteenth and twentieth centuries but as the city grew, many of the houses have been remodeled or demolished to make way for bigger houses.

=== Historical buildings ===
- Hephzhi bar house: This house was completed in 1924. It was the residence of P.H. Williams, a Lagos merchant whose parents traveled back to Africa from Trinidad when he was a young boy. The house is a three-storey building designed by Herbert Macaulay. The front door opens to a large passage that will lead guests to the living room, two adjoining bedrooms were at the sides. A wooden staircase goes upstairs with the same pattern like the floor below but with smaller passages and rooms. The windows are large and are located at both sides of the structure and also at the back of the building.

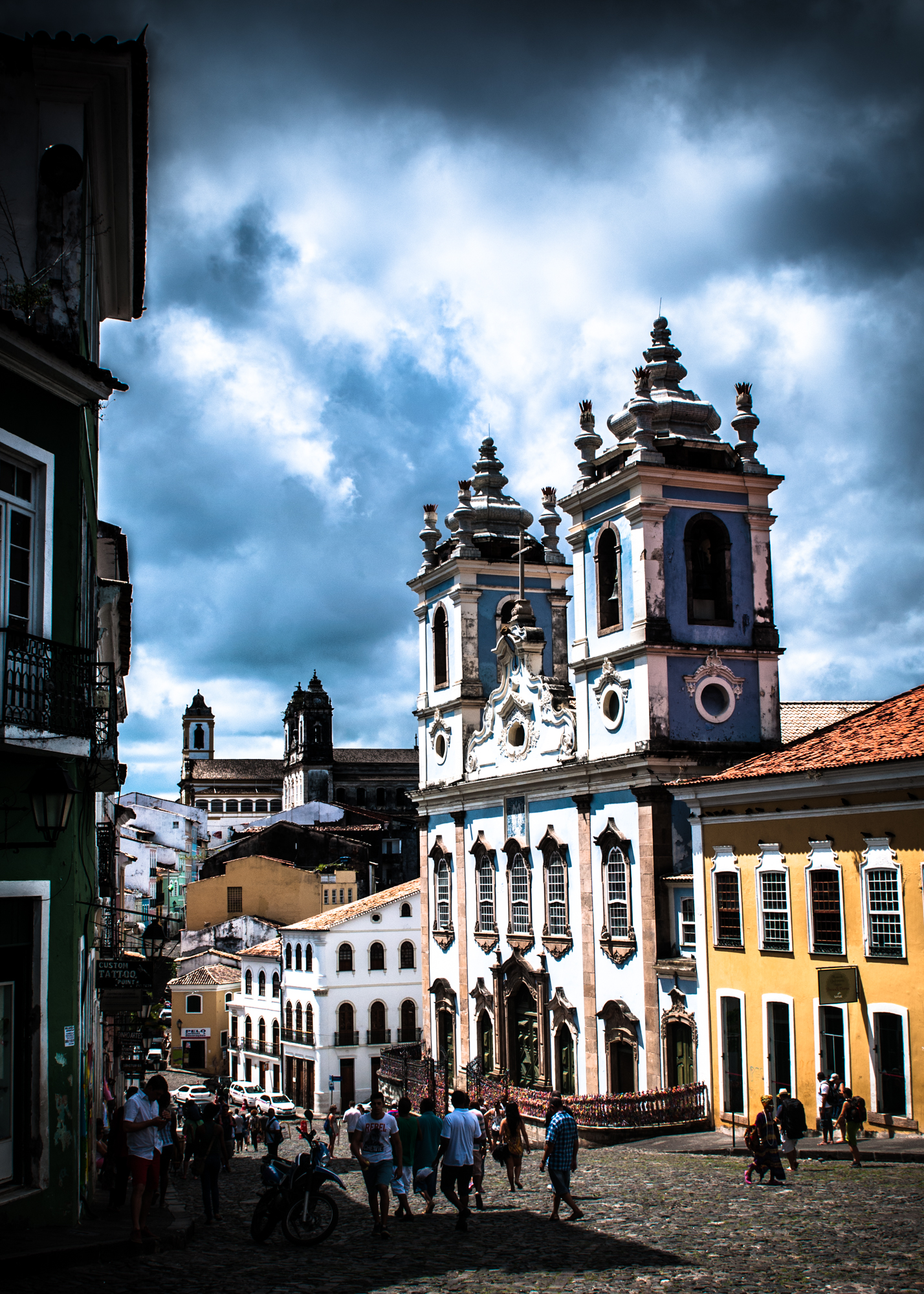
Afro-Brazilian Catholic Church in Bahia

- Holy Cross Cathedral: This was the first Catholic Church and the first brick church built in Lagos. Construction started in 1878 and it was finally completed in 1880. The appearance of the structure is cruciform with aisle naves, transepts and two towers. Though the Brazilian workers preferred a baroque style, the French missionaries who supervised construction imposed a Gothic style that was used. After many years, the two towers were demolished and the Eastern end was enlarged.
- Water House: This house was built by Joao Esan da Rocha and then expanded by his son, Candido. It was called the Water House because Joao Esan dug a well at the backyard which was used to sell pipe water to Lagosians. He wanted the house built in a style similar to the house he lived in located in Bahia after he gained manumission. The house is Brazilian baroque and was originally built for a nuclear family, but structural extensions completed in the 1960s can accommodate more family members.

== Notable Brazilian Nigerians ==
- DJ Caise
- DJ Xclusive
- Adetokunbo Ademola
- Adeyemo Alakija
- Aduke Alakija
- Kojo Annan
- Elizabeth Abimbola Awoliyi
- Mobolaji Bank Anthony
- Bankole Cardoso
- Candido Da Rocha
- Moses Da Rocha
- T. A. Doherty
- Bernardine Evaristo
- Abimbola Fernandez
- Antonio Deinde Fernandez
- J. M. Johnson
- Jibril Martin
- Orlando Martins
- Abimbola Omololu-Mulele
- Femi Pedro
- Ibijoke Sanwo-Olu
- Joke Silva

== See also ==
- Assimilados
- Nigerian Brazilian
- Bourgeoisie of Nigeria
- Emancipados
- Tabom people

== Sources ==
- Cunha, Marianno Carneiro da (1985). Da senzala ao sobrado: arquitetura brasileira na Nigéria e na República Popular do Benim [From slave quarters to town houses : Brazilian architecture in Nigeria and the People's Republic of Benin]. Photographs by Pierre Verger. São Paulo: SP: Nobel.
- Otero, Solimar (January 1, 2002). "'Orunile,' heaven is home:" Afrolatino diasporas in Africa and the *Americas (Thesis). University of Pennsylvania. Archived from the original on July 28, 2005.
- Alonge, Marjorie Moji Dolapo (1994). Afro-Brazilian architecture in Lagos State : a case for conservation (Thesis). Newcastle University. hdl:10443/883.
