= Ramatu =

Ramatu is a name. Notable people with this name include:

- Ramatu Aliu Mahama (1951-2022), second lady of Ghana
- Ramatu Baba, Ghanaian politician
- Ramatu Tijani Aliyu (born 1970), Nigerian politician
- Ramatu Yakubu (born 1999), Nigerian badminton player
- Ramatu Yaradua, commissioner for Ministry of Investment, Commerce, and Industry
