= Gbolahan Yishawu =

Nigerian politician

Hon. Gbolahan Olusegun Yishawu

Member, Lagos State House of Assembly
- Incumbent
- Assumed office 2011
- Constituency: Eti-Osa Constituency II

Personal details
- Born: December 8, 1967 (age 58) Lagos Island, Lagos State, Nigeria
- Party: All Progressives Congress (APC)
- Education: University of Nigeria, Nsukka (B.Eng), University of Lagos (M.Sc)
- Occupation: Engineer, Politician

Gbolahan Olusegun Yishawu (born 8 December 1967) is a Nigerian engineer and politician who currently serves as a member of the Lagos State House of Assembly, representing Eti-Osa Constituency II.

== Early life and education ==
Gbolahan Yishawu was born on December 8, 1967, in Lagos Island, Lagos State.

He began his primary education at A.D.R.A.O. International School, Victoria Island, Lagos. For his secondary education, he attended Government College, Lagos, before proceeding to Greylands International College in the United Kingdom for his O-Levels and A-Levels.

He returned to Nigeria for higher education, attending the University of Nigeria, Nsukka, where he graduated with a Bachelor of Engineering (B.Eng.) degree in Electronic Engineering in 1990. He later obtained a Master of Science (M.Sc.) in Computer Science from the University of Lagos.

== Career ==
Before entering politics, Yishawu had a successful career in the technology and engineering sectors. He served as the Executive Director of Learning System Ltd and has extensive experience in the Information and Communication Technology (ICT) industry.

Yishawu's political journey began at the local government level, where he served as a member of the Executive Committee for Ikoyi/Obalende Local Government Area in 2003. He also served as the Vice Chairman of the Bursary and Scholarship Board for the same LCDA in 2005.

He was first elected into the Lagos State House of Assembly in 2011 to represent Eti-Osa Constituency II. He has been re-elected in subsequent elections (2015, 2019, and 2023), making him one of the ranking members of the Assembly.

In the 9th Assembly, he served as the Chairman of the House Committee on Economic Planning and Budget, where he oversaw the state's budgetary processes. Following his re-election into the 10th Assembly in 2023, he was appointed as the Chairman of the House Committee on Waterfront Infrastructure Development.

He is credited with sponsoring several impactful bills, including a bill to protect non-smokers in public places and the Rape Victim Shield and Civil Liability Bill.
