= Tabom people =

Ethnic group in Ghana

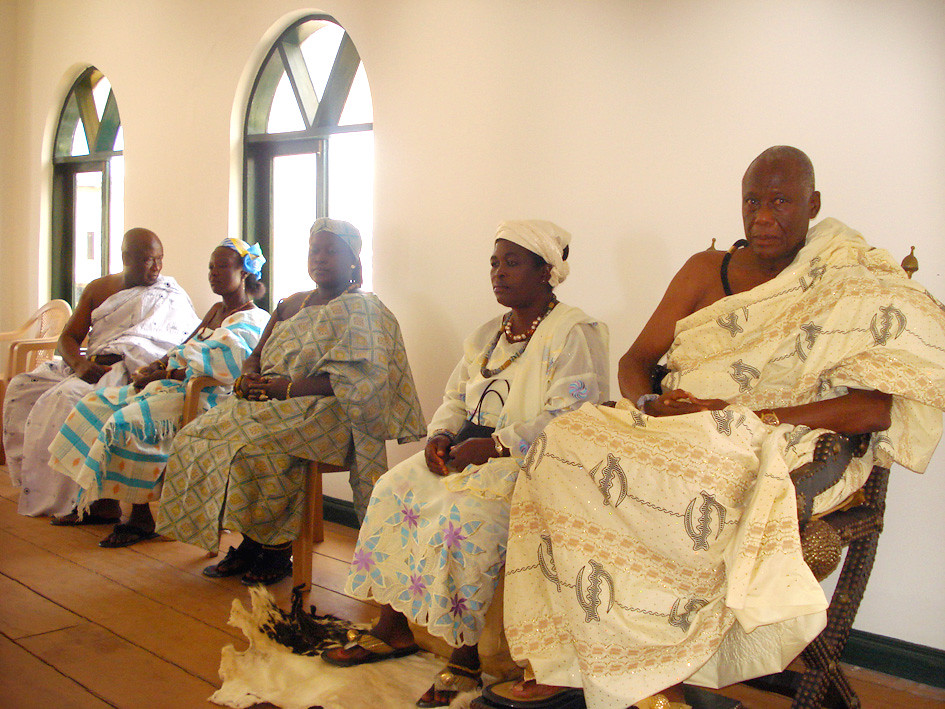
- Tabom leaders in the Brazil House, in Accra, Ghana

Regions with significant populations
- Accra and Kumasi.

Languages
- English; French; Ga; Portuguese; European languages (German, Venetian, Polish, etc.); Asian languages (Japanese, etc.)

Religion
- Protestantism; Catholicism

Related ethnic groups
- Afro-Brazilians; Amaro Nigerians; Americo Liberians; African Americans; Black Britons; Krio Fernandinos; Gold Coast Euro-Africans; Saro (Nigerian Creoles); Aku (Gambian Creoles); Sierra Leone Creoles; Afro-Caribbeans; Yoruba People

The Tabom are a community of Afro-Brazilian descendants who lives in Accra, the capital of Ghana, consisting of the descendants of former enslaved people who, after being freed in Brazil, returned to Africa in the 19th century. When they arrived in Jamestown, the oldest, seaside neighborhood of Accra, the former slaves and their descendants could speak only Portuguese, and would conspicuously use the phrase "Tá bom" ("Okay"), so the local Gã people, who primarily inhabited Accra, started to call them the "Tabom".

Similar groups of returned, former enslaved Afro-Brazilians, also exist in Benin, Togo and Nigeria (mainly in the Lagos region), where they are instead known as Agudás or Amarôs.

== Origins of the Afro-Brazilian community in Ghana ==
The Afro-Brazilian descendants and community in the south of Ghana dates back to one study from the 19th century that between an estimated 3,000 and 8,000 former slaves decided to return to Africa.

Up to now, it is not very clear if the Tabom really bought their freedom and decided to immediately come back or if they were at that time free workers in Brazil who came after the Malê revolt of 1835 in Bahia. A lot of Afro-Brazilians when persecuted found their way back to Ghana, Togo, Benin and Nigeria especially those who organised the Malê Revolt. In Ghana, it is common to find family names like de Souza, Silva, or Cardoso. Some of them have been very well known in Ghana.

== Afro-Brazilians in Ghana ==
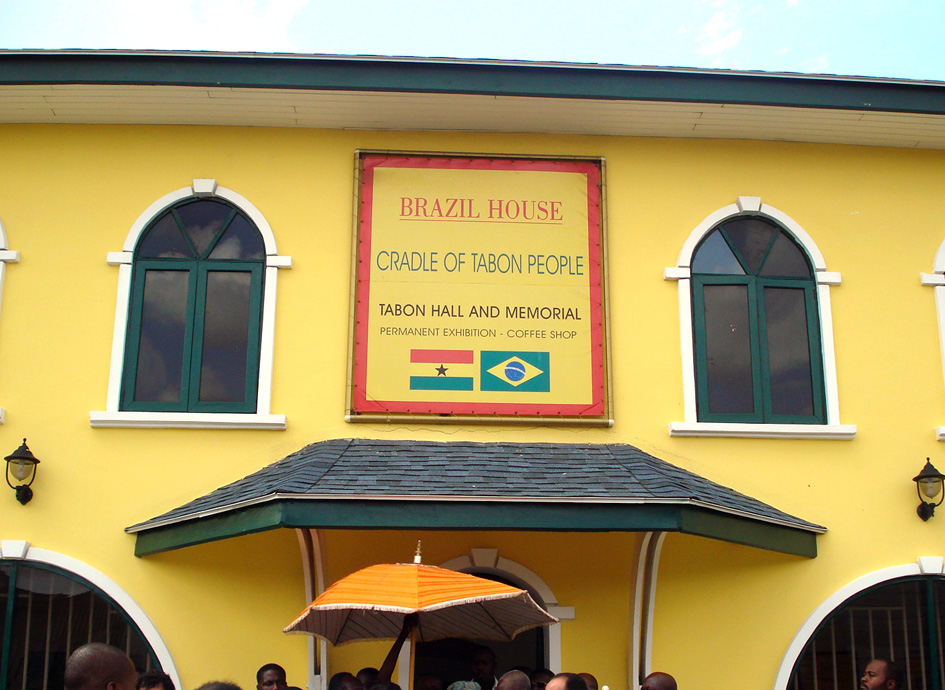
The main house of the Tabom People, in Accra, Ghana, formerly enslaved people who returned to Africa after the abolition of slavery in Brazil. The House became a memorial place: the "Brazil House".

In Ghana, the representative group of people that decided to come back from Brazil is the Tabom people. They came back on a ship called SS Salisbury, offered by the British government. About seventy Afro-Brazilians of seven different families arrived in South Ghana and Accra, in the region of the old port in James Town in 1836. The reception by the Mantse Nii Ankrah of the Otublohum area was so warm that they decided to settle down in Accra. The leader of the Tabom group at the time of their arrival was a returned named Nii Azumah Nelson. The eldest son of Azumah Nelson, Nii Alasha, was his successor and a very close friend to the Ga King Nii Tackie Tawiah. Together they helped in the development of the whole community in commerce.

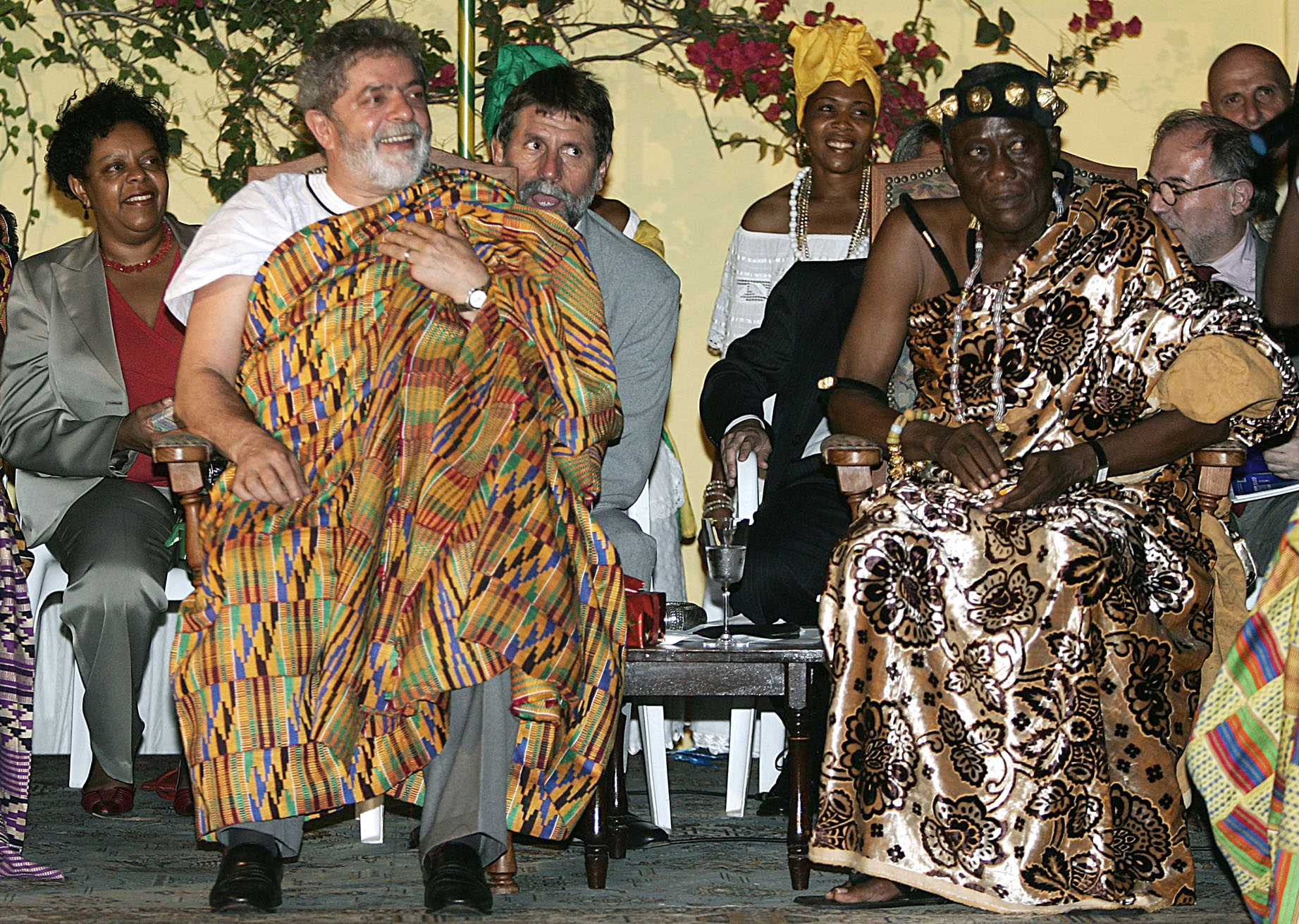
During his official visit to Ghana as President of Brazil, Presidente Luiz Inácio Lula da Silva met with the Tabom community in the Brazil House.

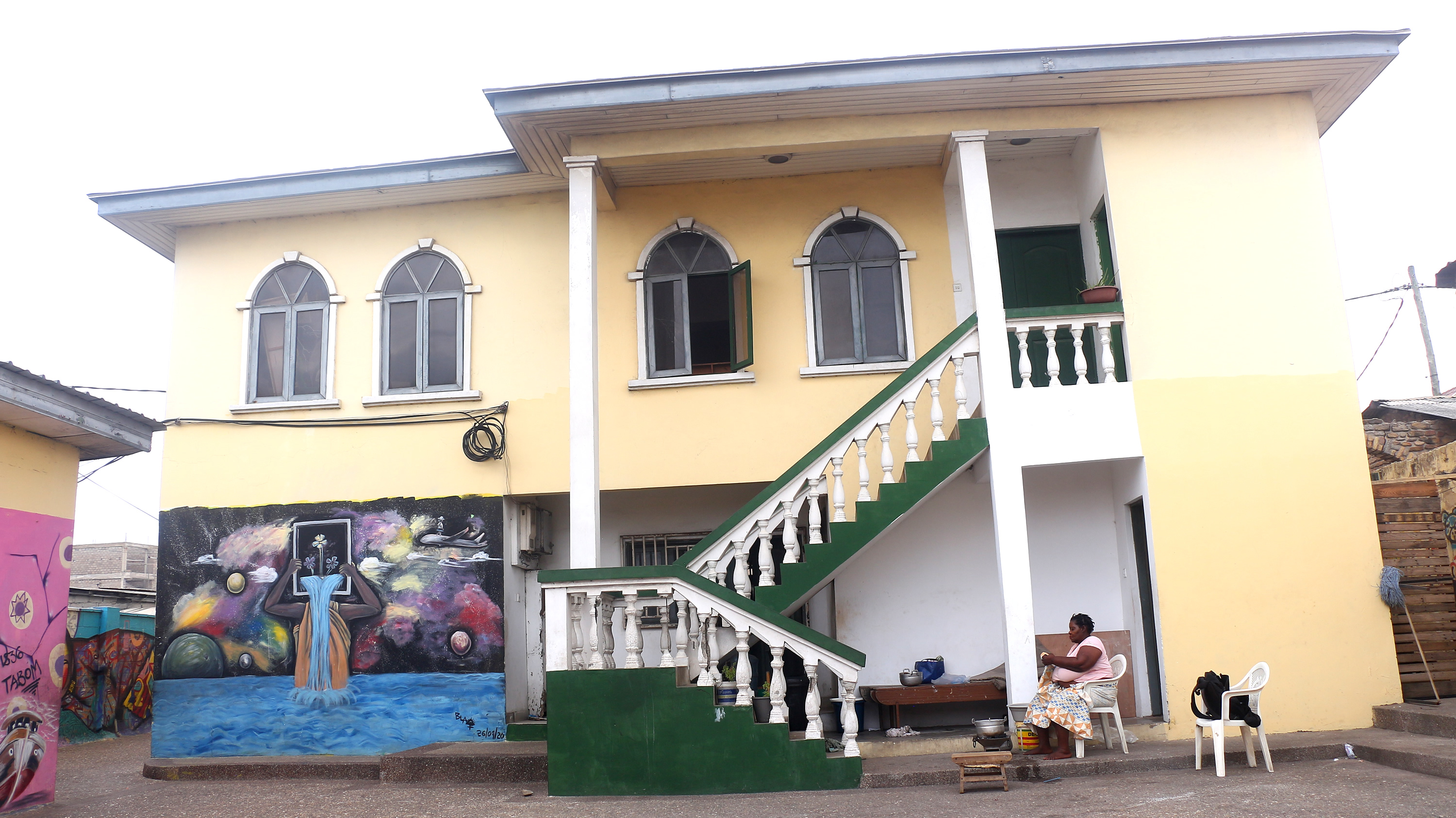
Brazil House in Jamestown, Accra, Ghana, can be conceptualized as an urban landscape of memory framing Tabon identity. The house was built by Mamah Nassar, the first man who came from Brazil to Ghana

Until 2025, the leader ("mantse") of the Tabom was Nii Azumah V, a direct descendant of Nii Azumah Nelson. Nii Azumah V died in September 2025, aged 89. As of 2026, a new Tabom leader had not been announced.

The Tabom are also known as the founders of the First Scissors House in 1854, the first tailoring shop in the country, which had amongst other activities, the task to provide the Ghanaian Army with uniforms. One notable figure is Dan Morton, a Tabom and one of the most famous tailors in Accra today.

In Ghana, the de Souza family can be found around Osu, Kokomlemle and other parts of the Greater Accra Region and South Ghana. Sekondi-Takoradi and Cape Coast are also other bases. Almost all of them remained along the coastal regions of South Ghana. However, it is very common to see a De Souza, a Wellington, a Benson, a Josiah, a Pereria, a Palmares, a Nelson, an Azumah, Amorin, Da Costa, Santos, De Medeiros, Nunoo, Olympio, Maslieno, Maselino (a changed version of 'Maslieno' by the late Rev. Canon Seth Nii Adulai Maselino (1919–1994) whose parents originated from Maslieno House in Adabraka, Accra) and other Afro-Brazilians in Ghana speaking perfect Ga-Adangbe. This is because most of the Afro-Brazilian people married Ga-Adangbes.

Because they were welcomed by the Gã-Dangbe people and received by their kings as personal guests, the Taboms received lands in privileged locations, in places that are nowadays very well-known estates, like Asylum Down, the area near to the central train station and around the Accra Brewery Company. In those areas, the mango trees planted by them bear silent witnesses to their presence. In the estate of North Ridge there is a street called "Tabom Street", which is a reminder of the huge plantations that they formerly had there. Some of the Taboms live nowadays in James Town, where the first house built and used by them as they arrived in South Ghana is located. It is called the "Brazil House" and can be found in a short street with the name "Brazil Lane". Because of their agricultural skills, they started plantations of mango, cassava, beans, and other vegetables. They brought also skills such as irrigation techniques, architecture, carpentry, blacksmithing, gold smithing, tailoring, amongst others, which certainly improved the quality of life of the whole community.

Nowadays, the Tabom are completely integrated into Ghanaian society and are a part of the Gã-Dangbe people.

== See also ==
- Azumah Nelson
