= Ramatu Yaradua =

Commissioner for Ministry of Investment, Commerce and Industry, Niger State

Ramatu Mohammed Yaradua is a former commissioner for Ministry of Investment, Commerce, and Industry in Niger State, Nigeria.

== Early life and education ==
Rahmatu hails from Enagi village in Edati Local Government Area of Niger State. Her primary education started at A.D.R.A.O. International School, Lagos, then she proceeded to the United Kingdom where she attended Ibstock Place School London. She studied International Relations and English at the Coventry University where she obtained a B.A. with a second class upper.

== Career ==
Ramatu started her career as project officer with a contracting company called Platform Nigeria Limited, one of the main contractors of Gwarimpa Estate, Abuja. She was later promoted to Marketing Manager of the company. Rahmatu subsequently joined MicroAccess Limited as Chief Marketing Executive, one of the pioneers in information and communication service providers in Nigeria. While working there, Ramatu managed the company’s largest portfolios such as The National Hospital Abuja, The Corporate Affairs Commission, Ministry of Information, the major oil servicing companies and several other important roles and it was under her leadership that her team developed the first national website for the Federal Republic of Nigeria, the first National Hospital website, and introduced CAC online reducing corporate registration.

Ramatu also served as the Director in the Hamble Group in the United Kingdom, and upon her return to her continent, she served as a Director of Hamble Group (Africa).

== Politics ==
From 2015-2023, she worked as a Commissioner with three portfolios in Niger State: Commissioner of Commerce, Industry and Investment; Commissioner of Transport; and Commissioner of Mineral Resources.

== Personal life ==
She is married to Alhaji Murtala Yar’adua, the former Minister of Defence.
