= Candido Da Rocha =

Nigerian businessman

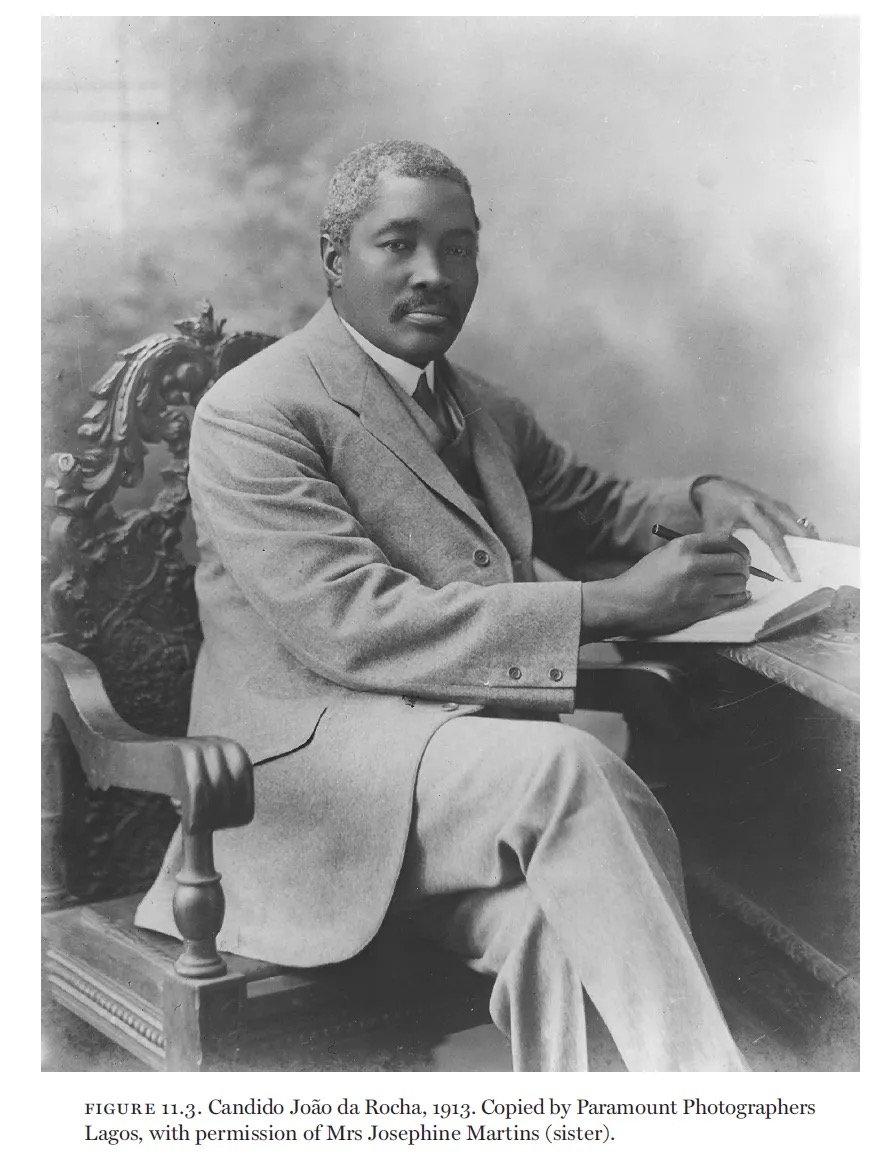
A pioneering Nigerian entrepreneur, philanthropist, and financier.

Chief Candido João Da Rocha (October 3, 1860 – March 11, 1959) was a Nigerian businessman, landowner and creditor. Da Rocha exemplified the transition from enslavement to becoming amongst the elite founders of modern Lagosian commerce and infrastructure. He owned Water House on Kakawa Street, Lagos Island, Lagos, and was the proprietor of the now defunct Bonanza Hotel in Lagos. He held the chieftaincy title of the Lodifi of Ilesa.

== Early Life & Education ==
Da Rocha, an ethnic Ijesha, was born to the family of Joao Esan Da Rocha, a former Brazilian slave; his father was 10 years old when he was captured as a slave in about 1840 and Candido was born in the Bahia region of Brazil.

Candido attended CMS Grammar School, Lagos where he was peers with Isaac Oluwole and Herbert Macaulay. Candido is the brother of Moses Da Rocha, one of the earliest Western-trained Nigerian doctors.

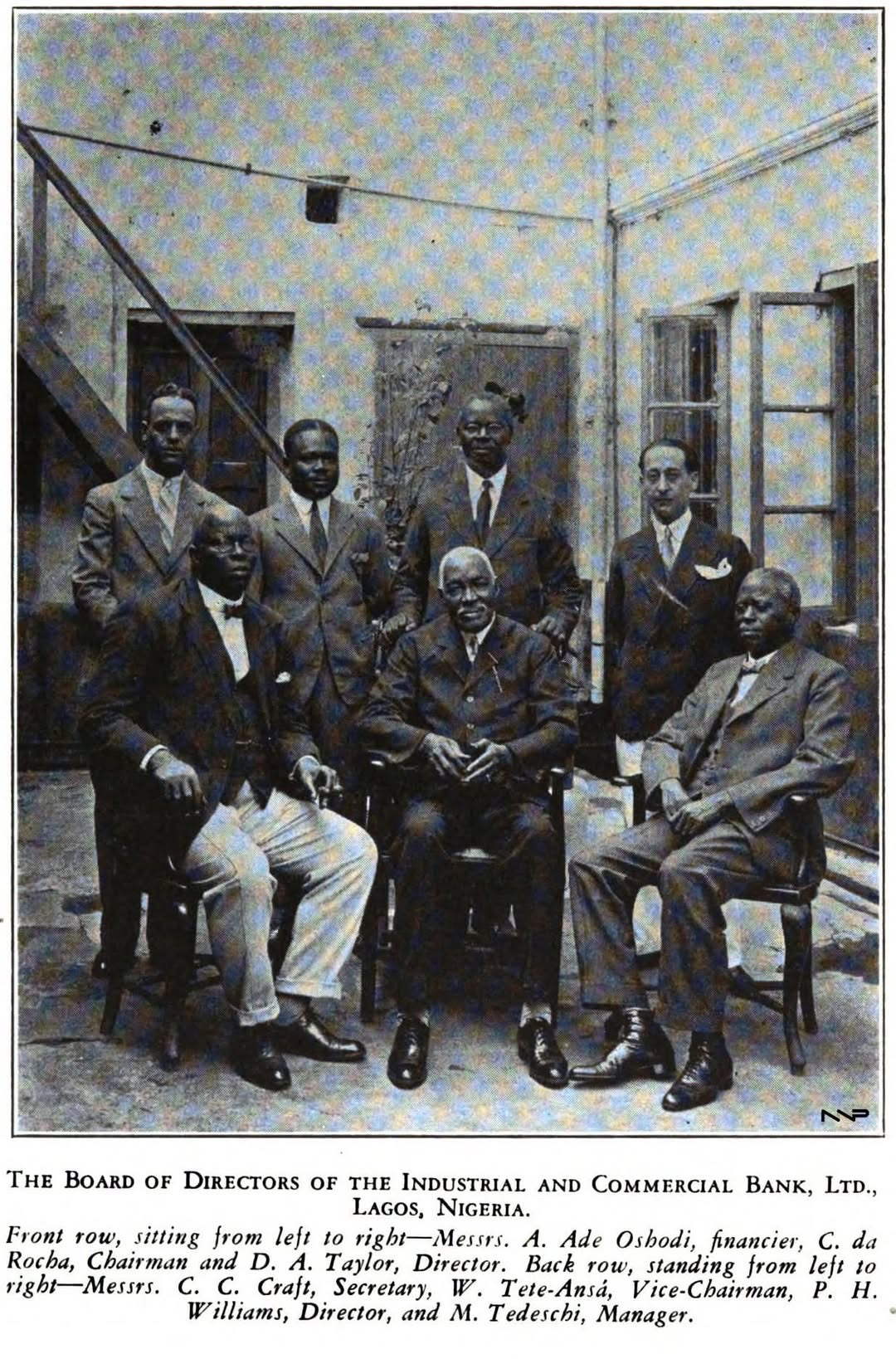
The downfall of the Industrial and Commercial Bank did not extinguish ambitions for indigenous banking; rather, it offered valuable lessons that shaped the establishment of more successful Nigerian-owned banks.

== Water Infrastructure ==
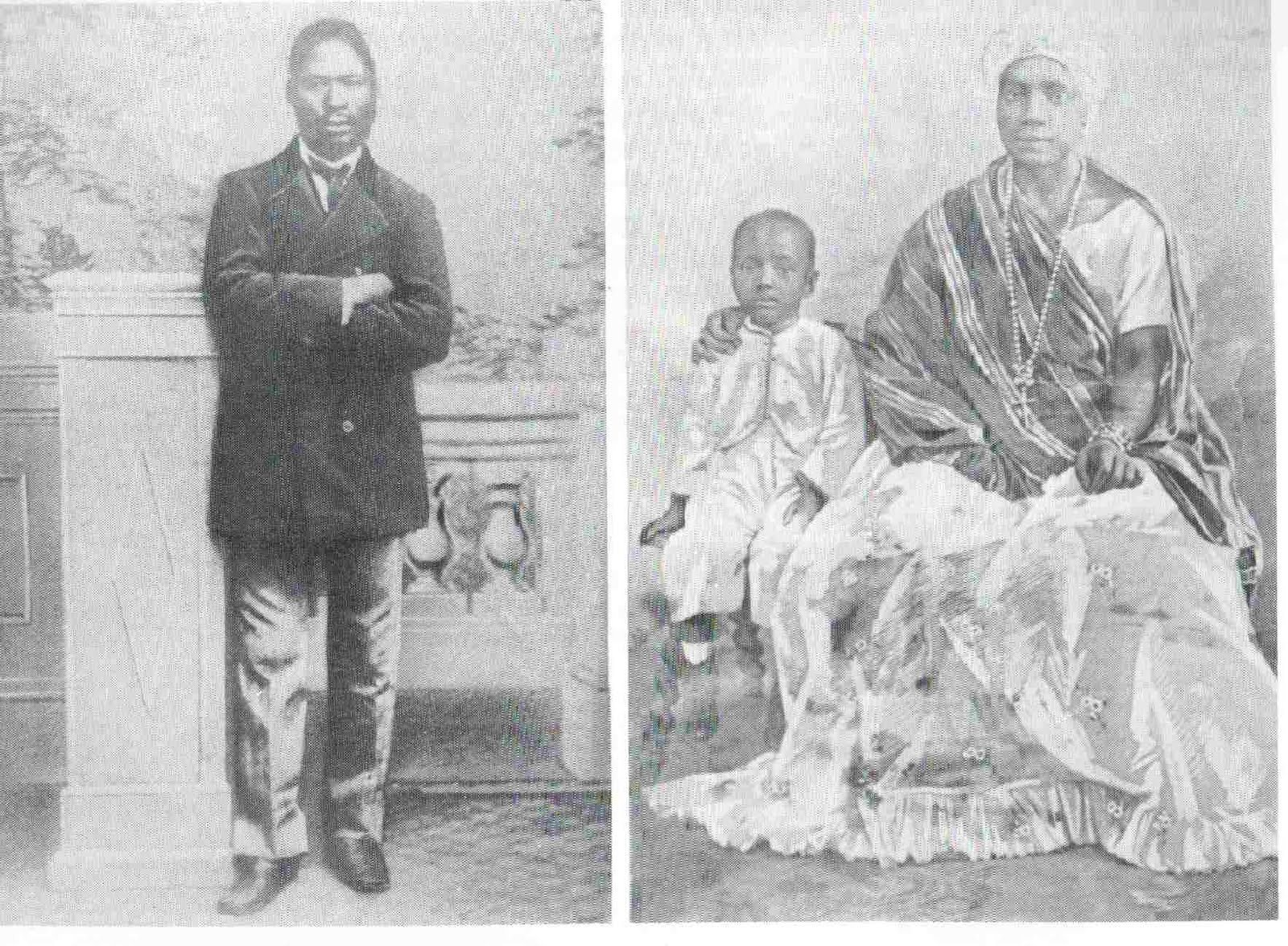
Left is Joao Esan and right is Candido as a young boy with his mother, Angelica

Candido da Rocha is renowned as the "first water millionaire”. He inherited his father’s house and launched a public water distribution system, supplying clean water in the 1920s, which served Lagos Island and surrounding areas. This was executed at his late Father’s house, known as the Water House on Kakawa Street. It was the first in Lagos to have a private borehole and a functioning water fountain, supplying the community and colonial officials.

== Business & Finance ==
Widely known as the 'Merchant Princes of Amaro', in addition to his ventures in water, Da Rocha engaged in moneylending, gold trading sometimes earning profits as high as 100% and property ownership. Thus, solidifying his reputation as one of Nigeria’s earliest recognised millionaires.

In 1907, Da Rocha collaborated with Lagos businessmen J. H. Doherty and Seidu Williams on a money lending business established under the name of the Lagos Native Bank. A pioneering effort to create an indigenous bank to compete with foreign banks, he also later ran the Industrial and Commercial Bank, providing credit to local individuals. Despite their brief existence, these banks played an important monopoly in challenging the dominance of foreign banking institutions during the colonial period.

Some of his business interests included a restaurant called The Restaurant Da Rocha and Sierra Leone Deep Sea Fishing Industries Ltd. He was a founding member of the Lagos auxiliary to the Anti Slavery and Aborigines Right Society which was headed by James Johnson and had Samuel Pearse, Hon. Justice Dahunsi Olugbemi Coker and Sapara Williams as members. Due to his adoration of horse racing, he built the Lagos Racing Club in 1891, where he raced with his friends such as J.H. Doherty.

== The Water House ==
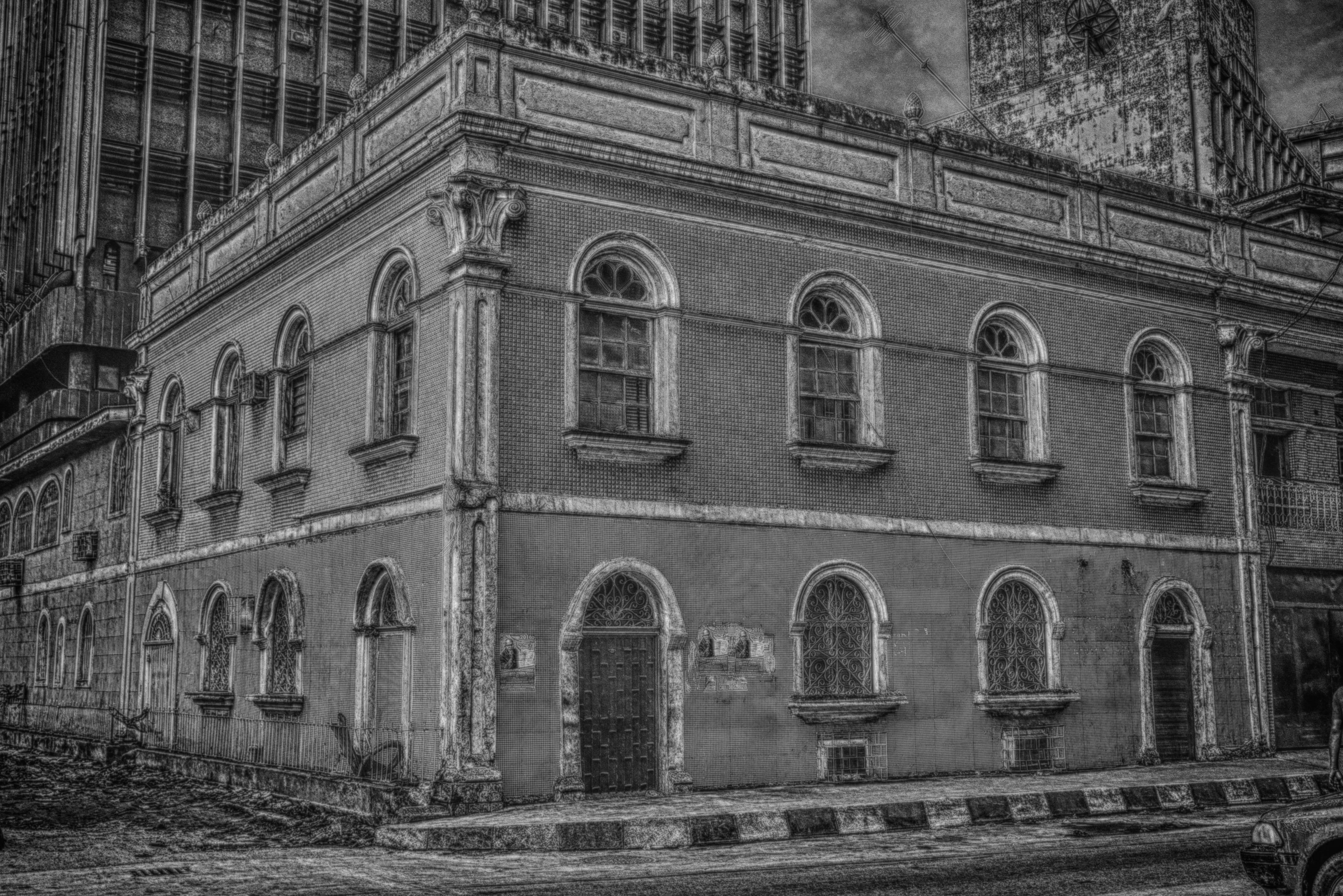
The Water House, Lagos

See also: Water House and Sobrado architecture

The Water House is a Brazilian baroque style house on Kakawa Street built in for Joao Esan Da Rocha. Known for the water-well dug in the backyard, the home was only one floor. After his father's passing, Candido Joao Da Rocha redesigned the house and implemented a sobrado second-story style. It is known as one of the prominent Nigerian-Brazilian architectures in Lagos, which has led the Nigerian Government to preserve and keep it listed. The home was commemorated in literature by a novel, The Water House, written by Antonio Olinto.

Brazilian Baroque Architecture (Sobrado)

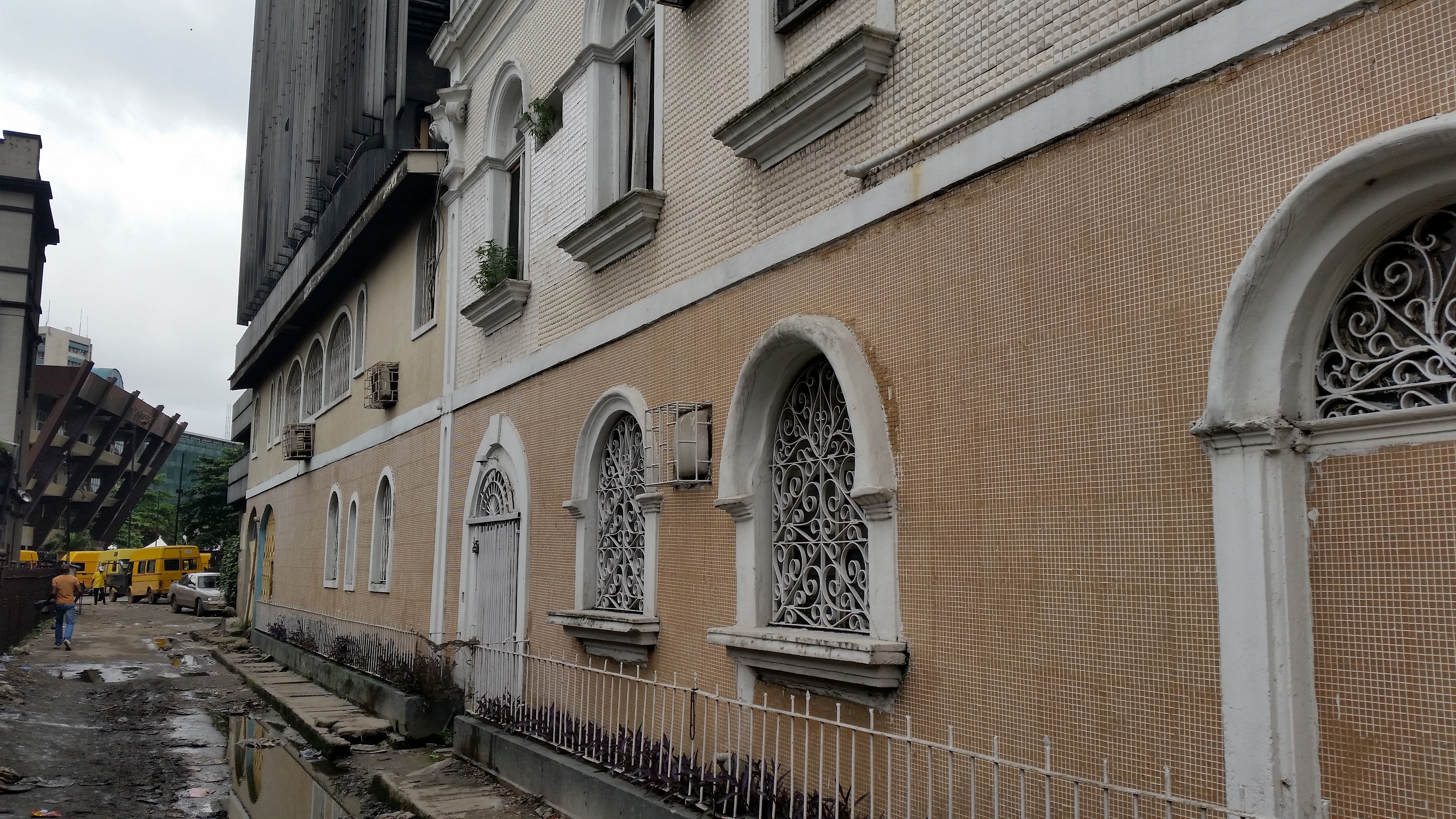

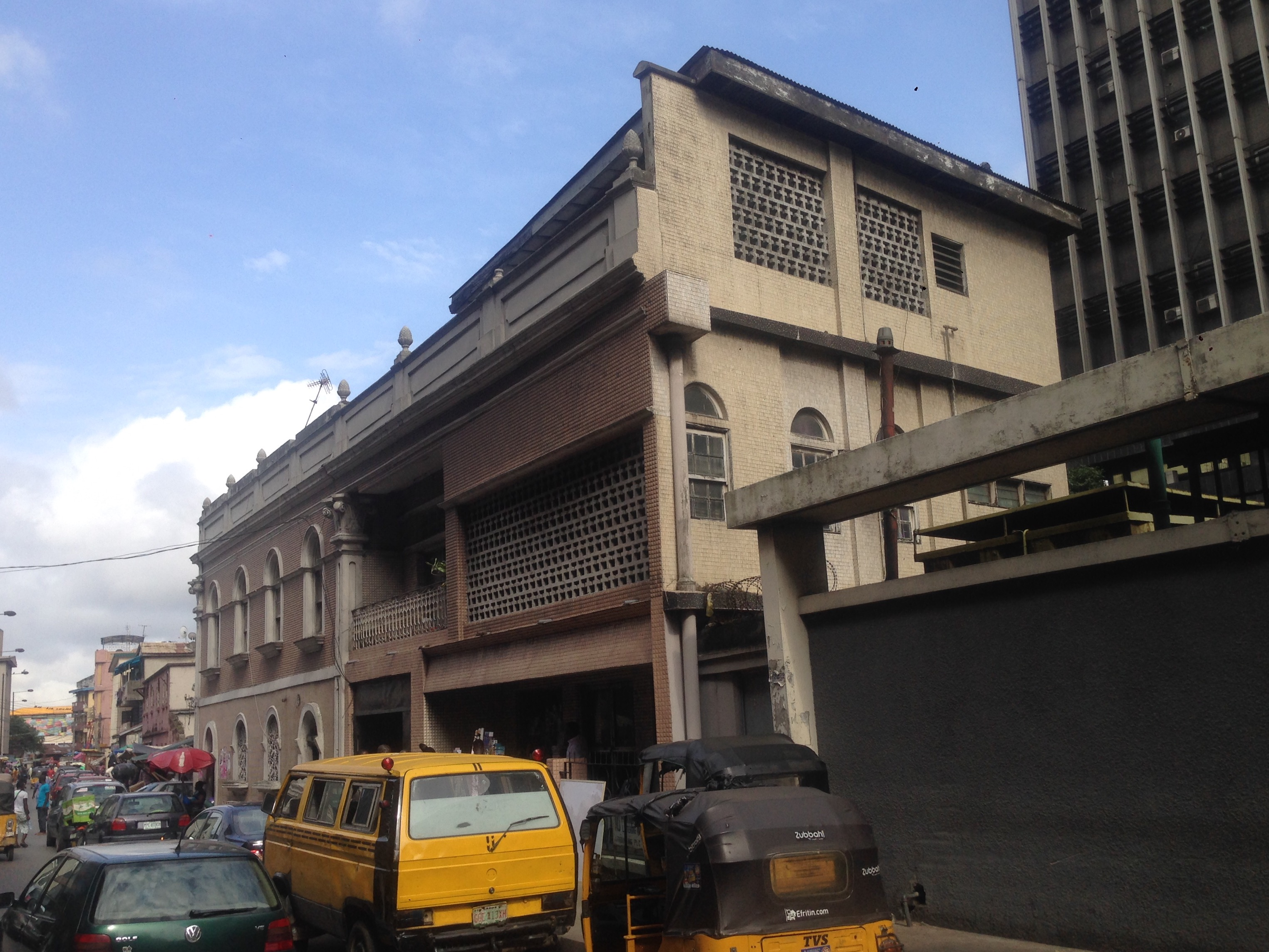

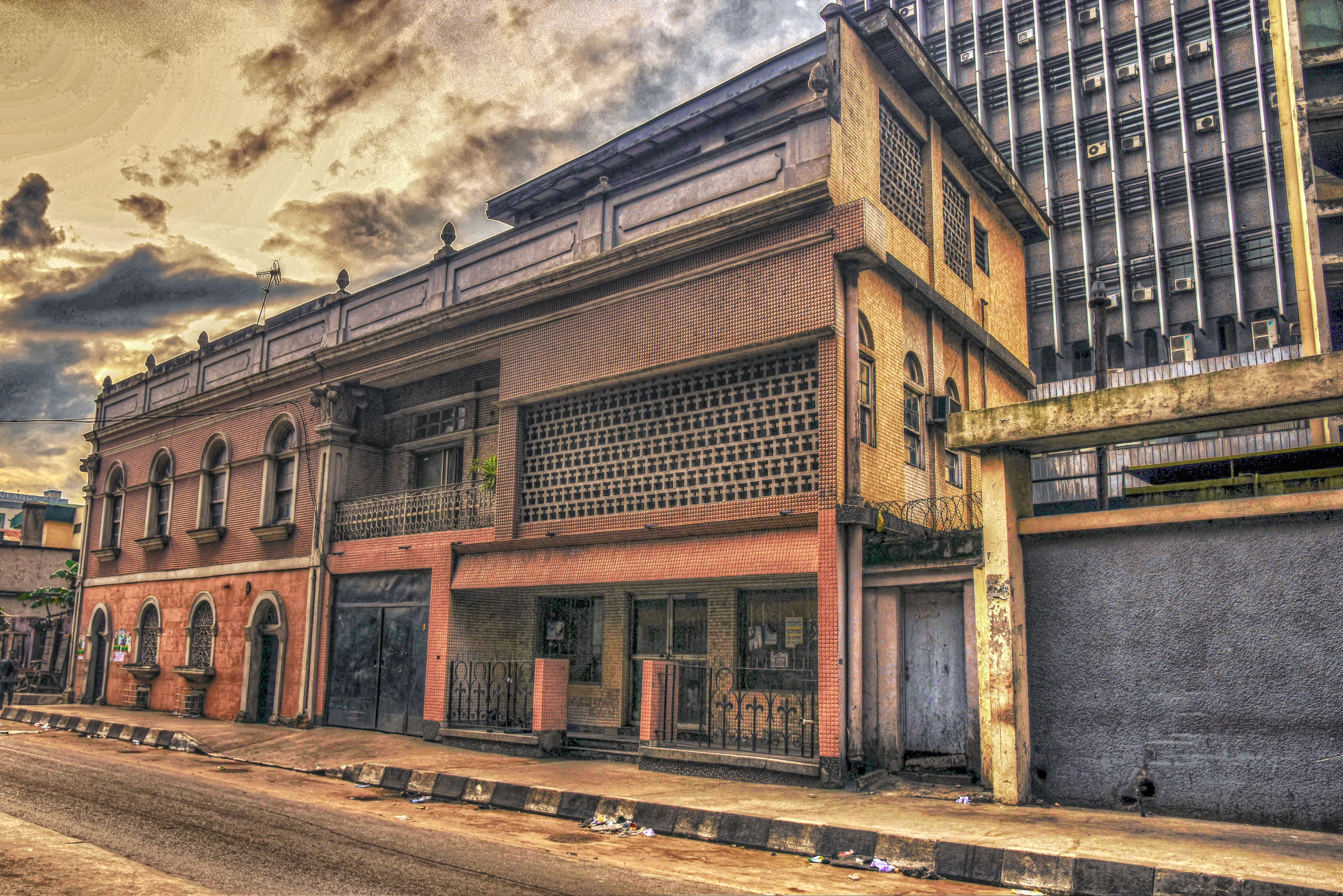

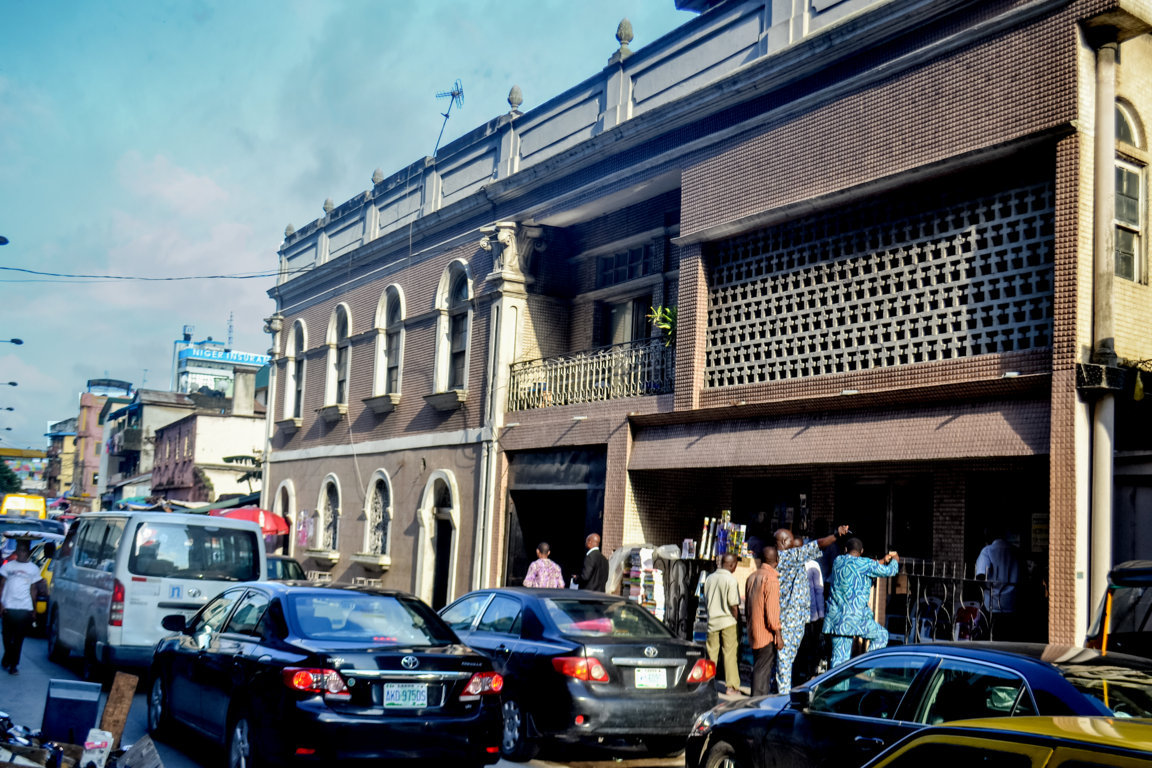

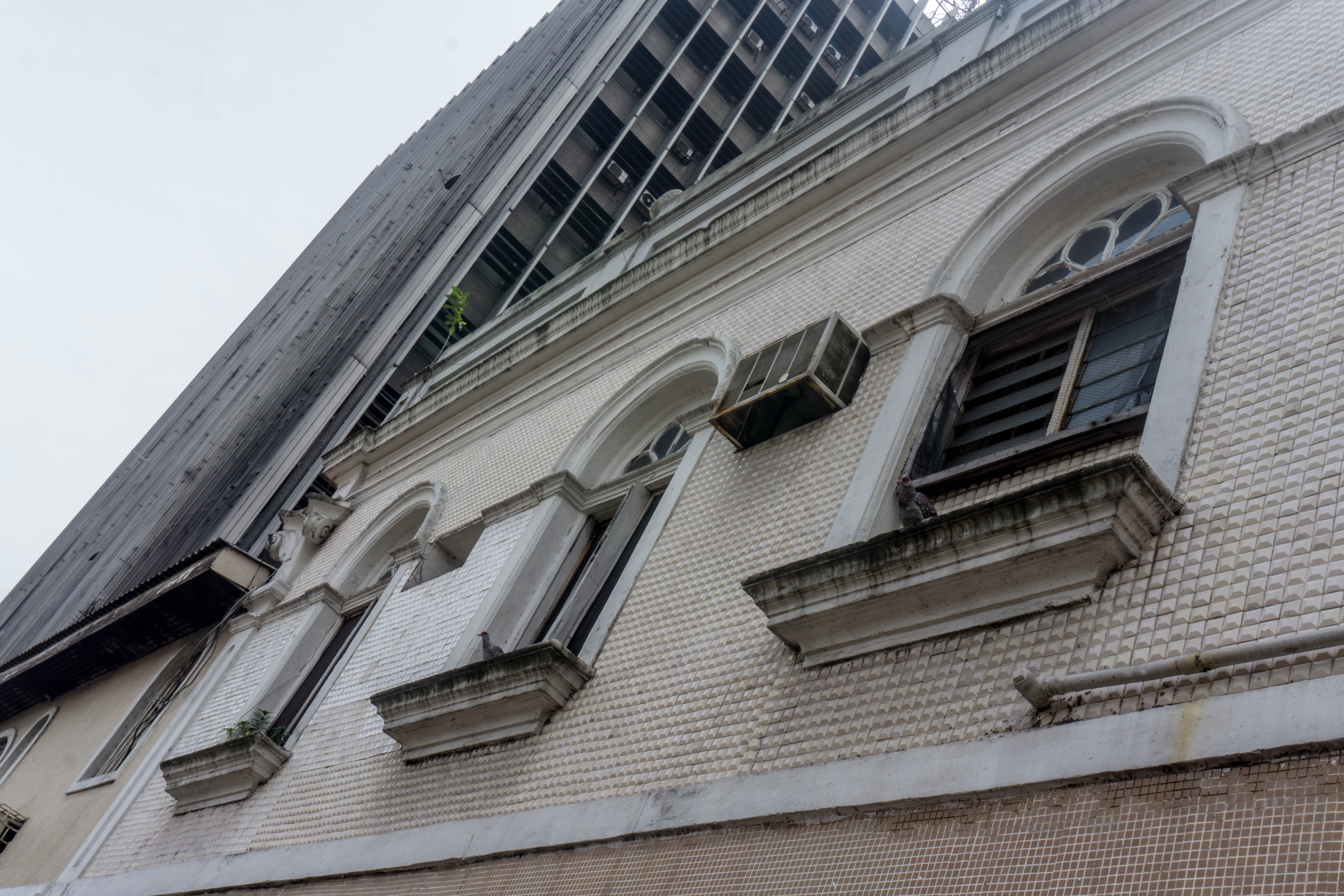

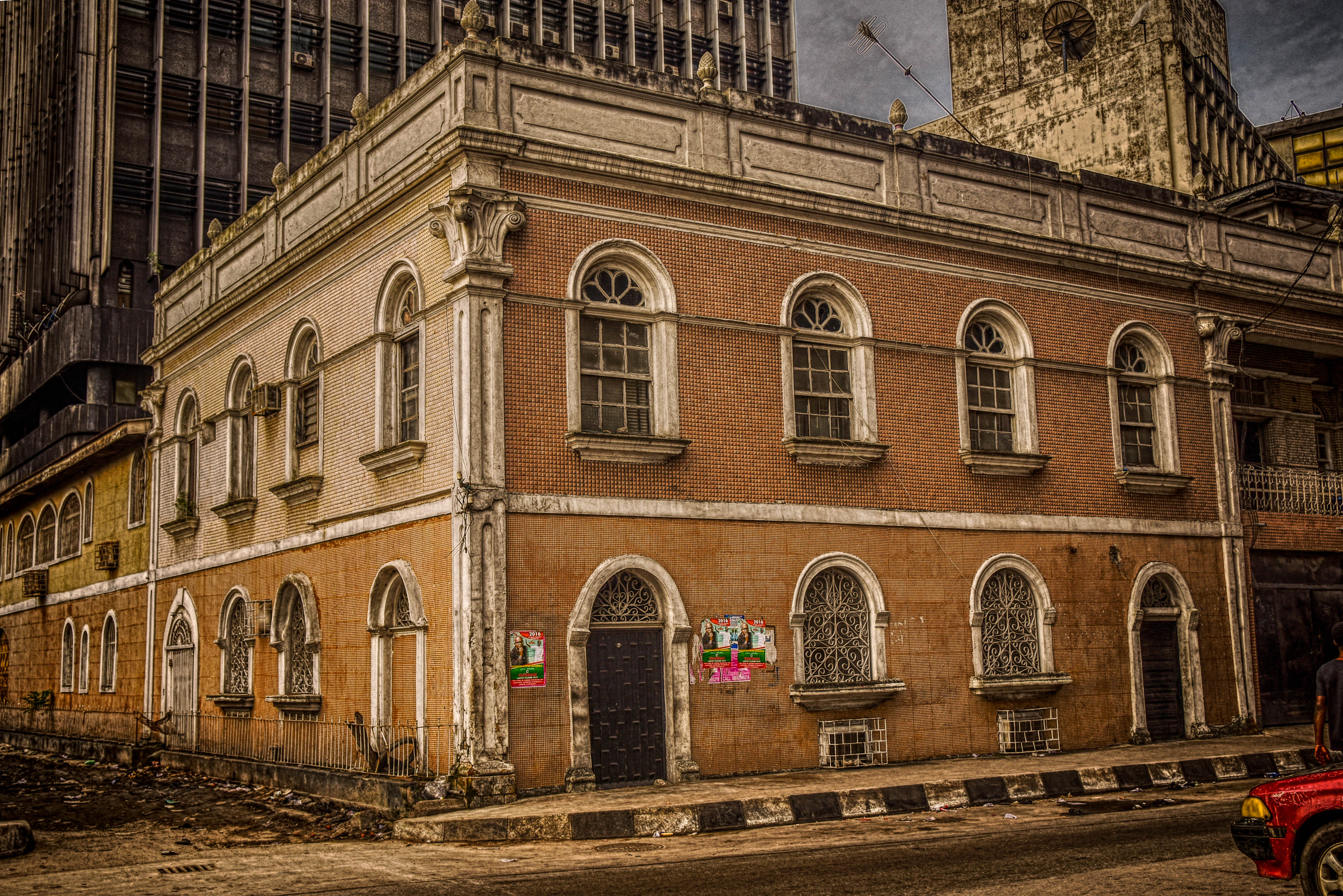

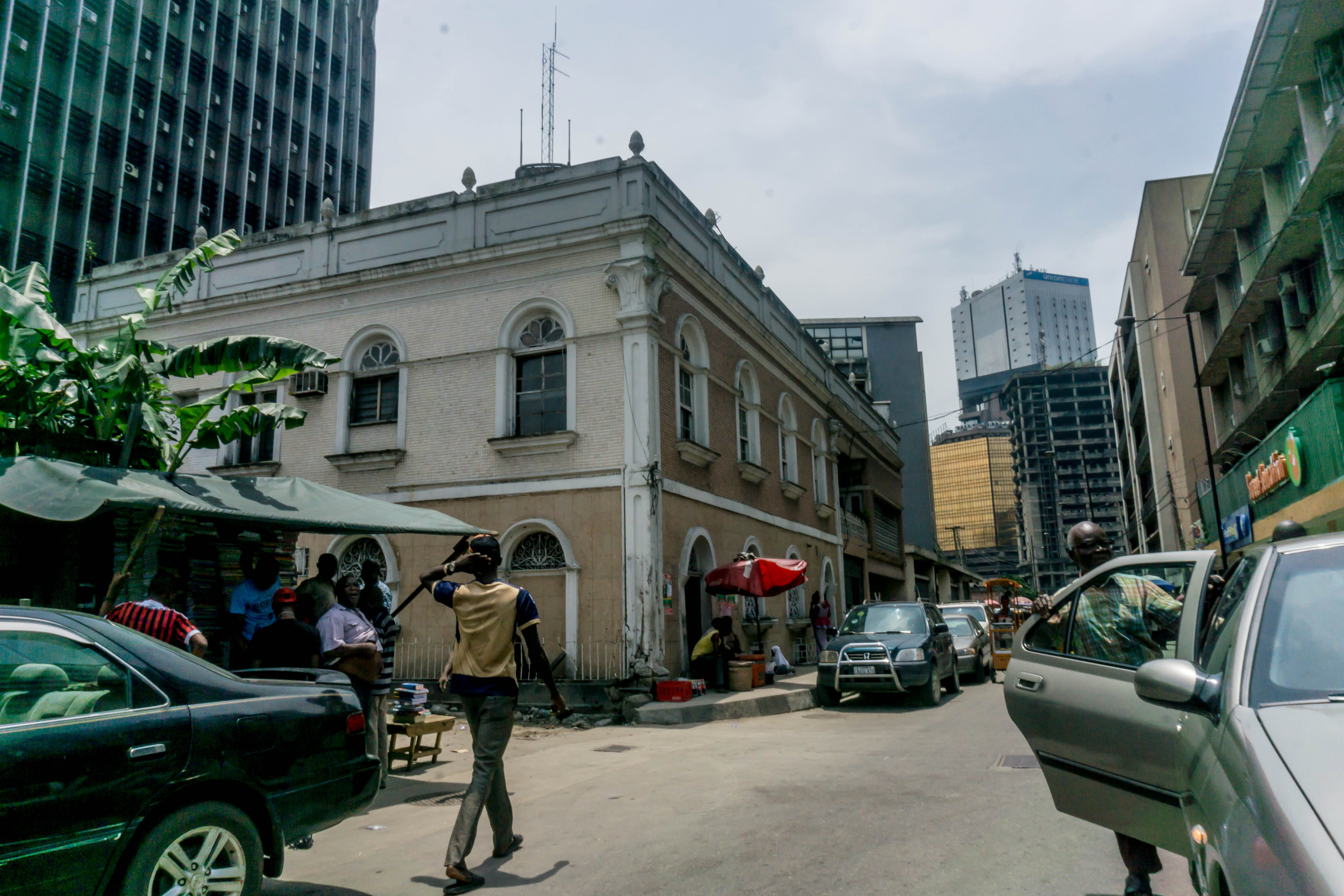

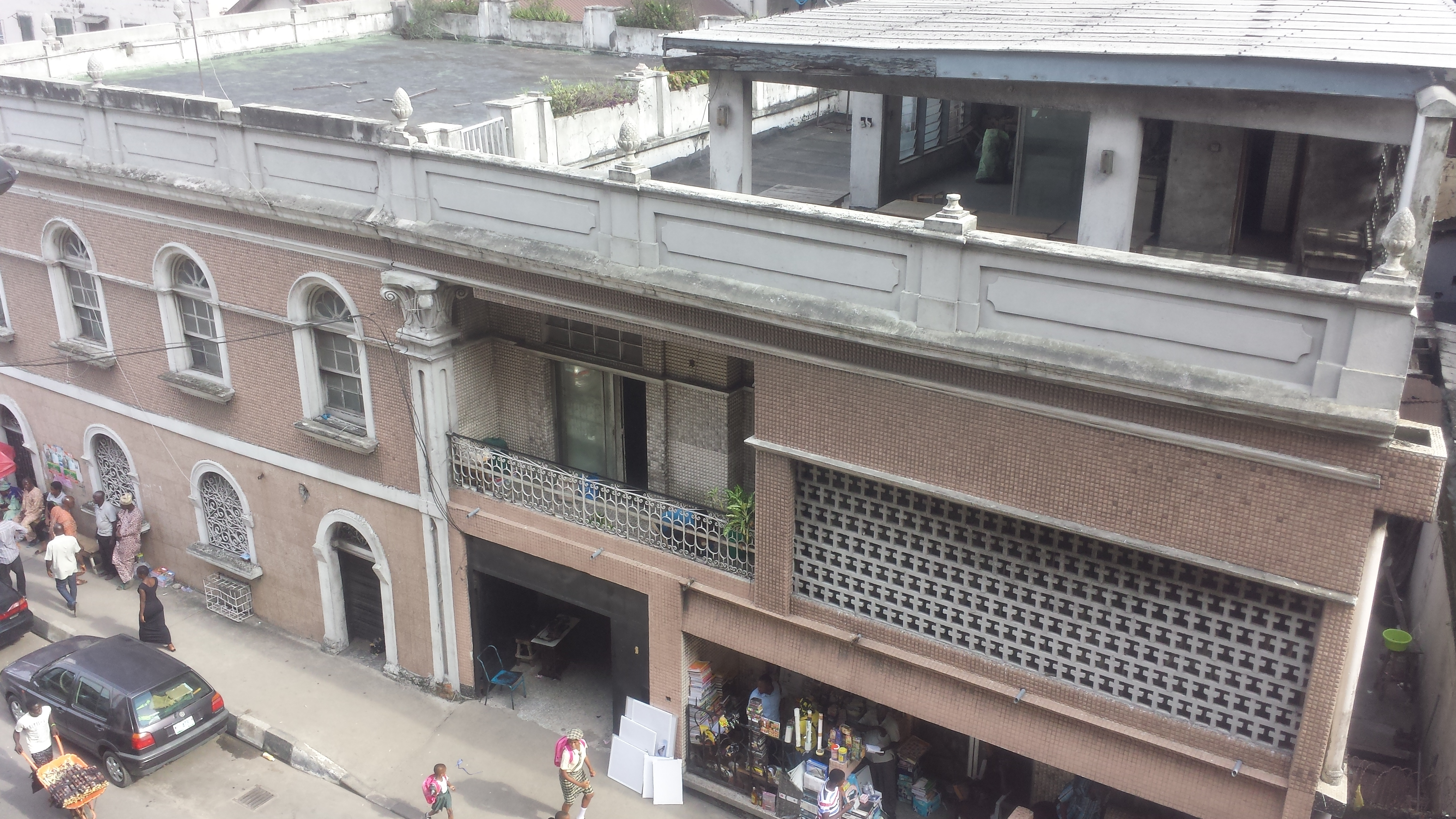

== Death, Legacy and Descendants ==
Da Rocha died in 1959 and is buried at Ikoyi Cemetery.

Among his children were Alexander Da Rocha, Adenike Afodu, Angelica Folashade Thomas and Louissa Turton. His grandchildren included the educationist Abimbola Omololu-Mulele.
