= Water House =

Brazilian architectural style building in Nigeria

The Water House is one of the few remaining residential buildings that showcases Brazilian architectural style in Nigeria. The building is located in Kakawa street, downtown Lagos, Lagos Island and built in the 19th century during the era of the Lagos colony. It was owned and inhabited by Candido Da Rocha.

== Gallery ==
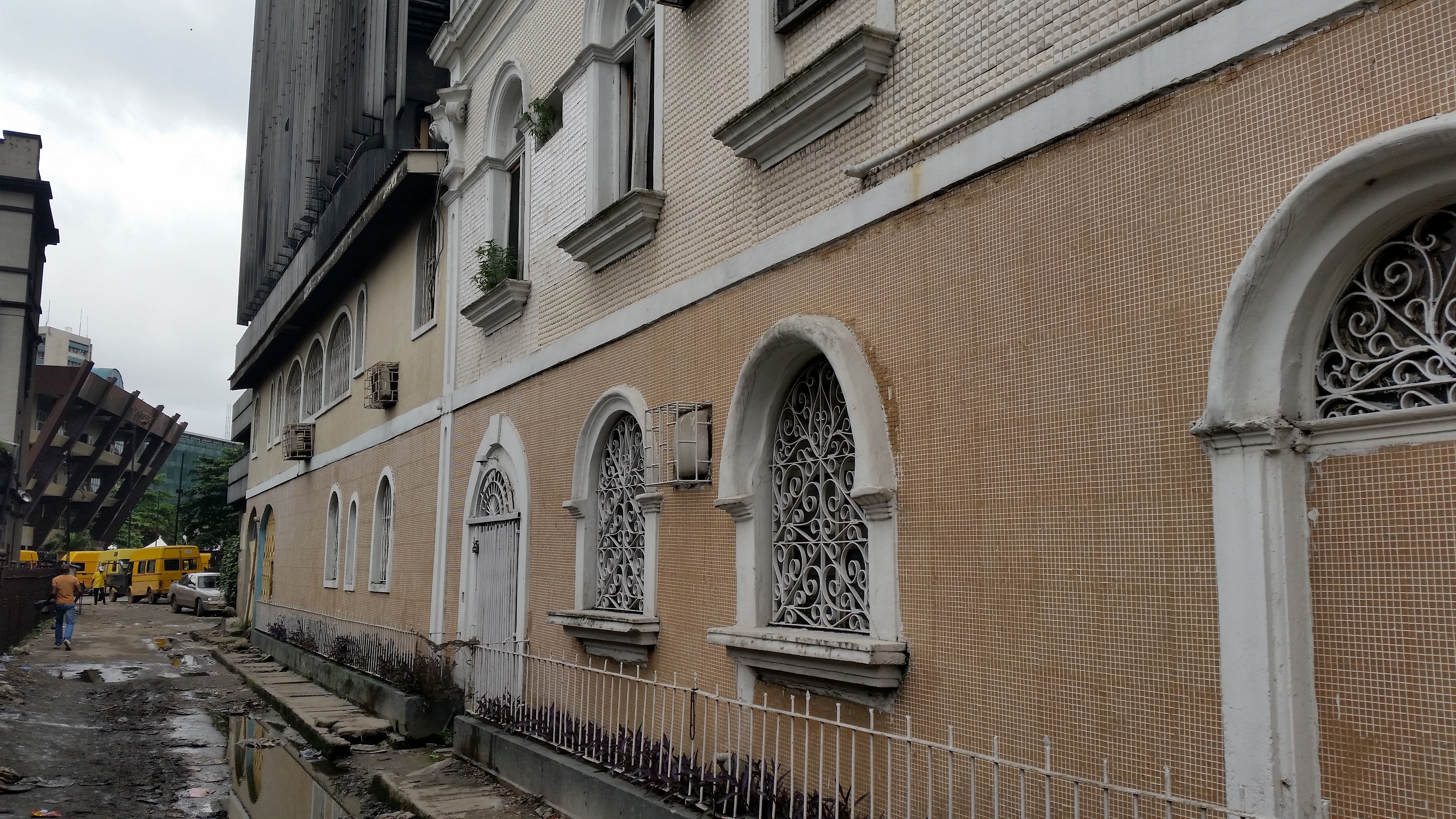

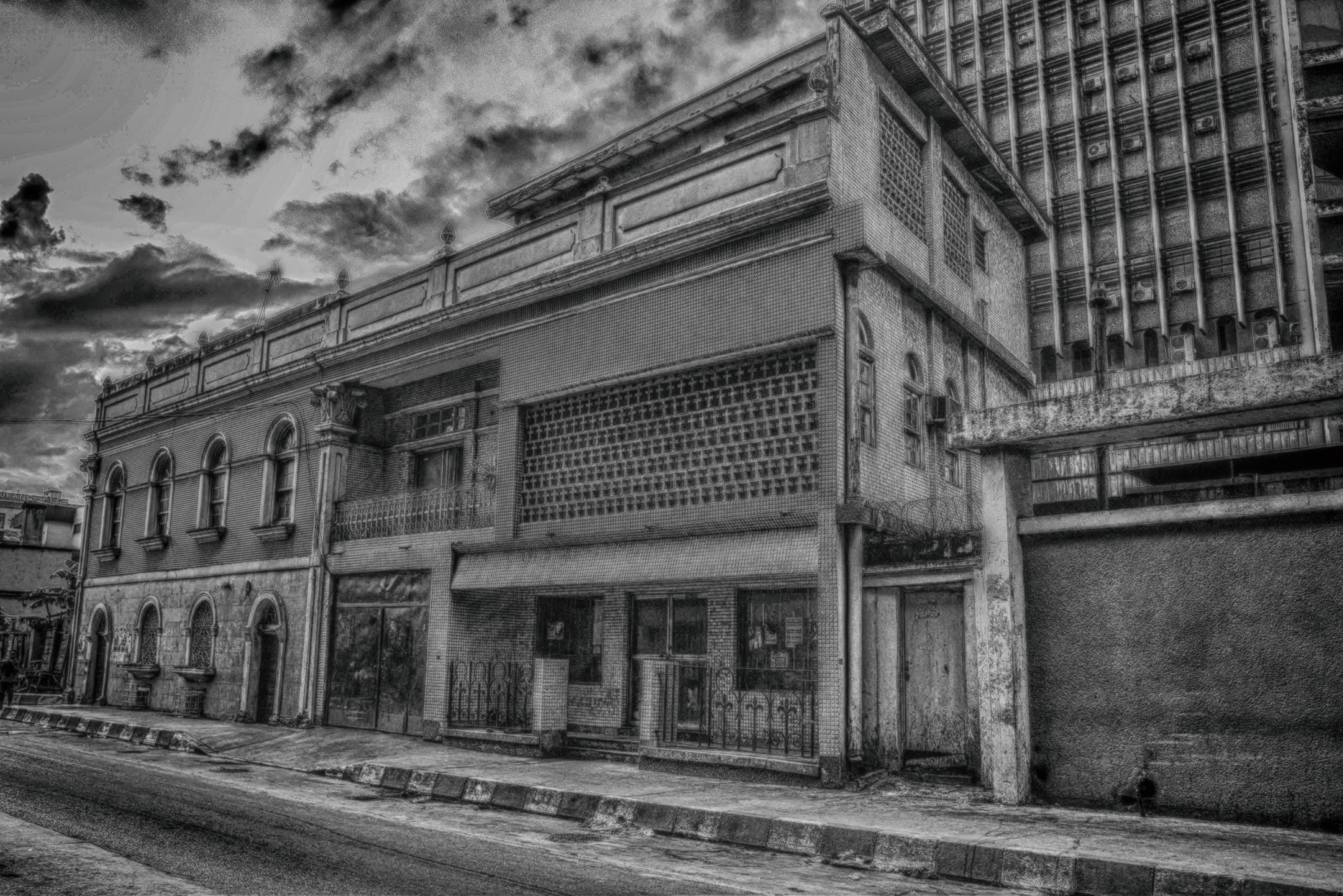

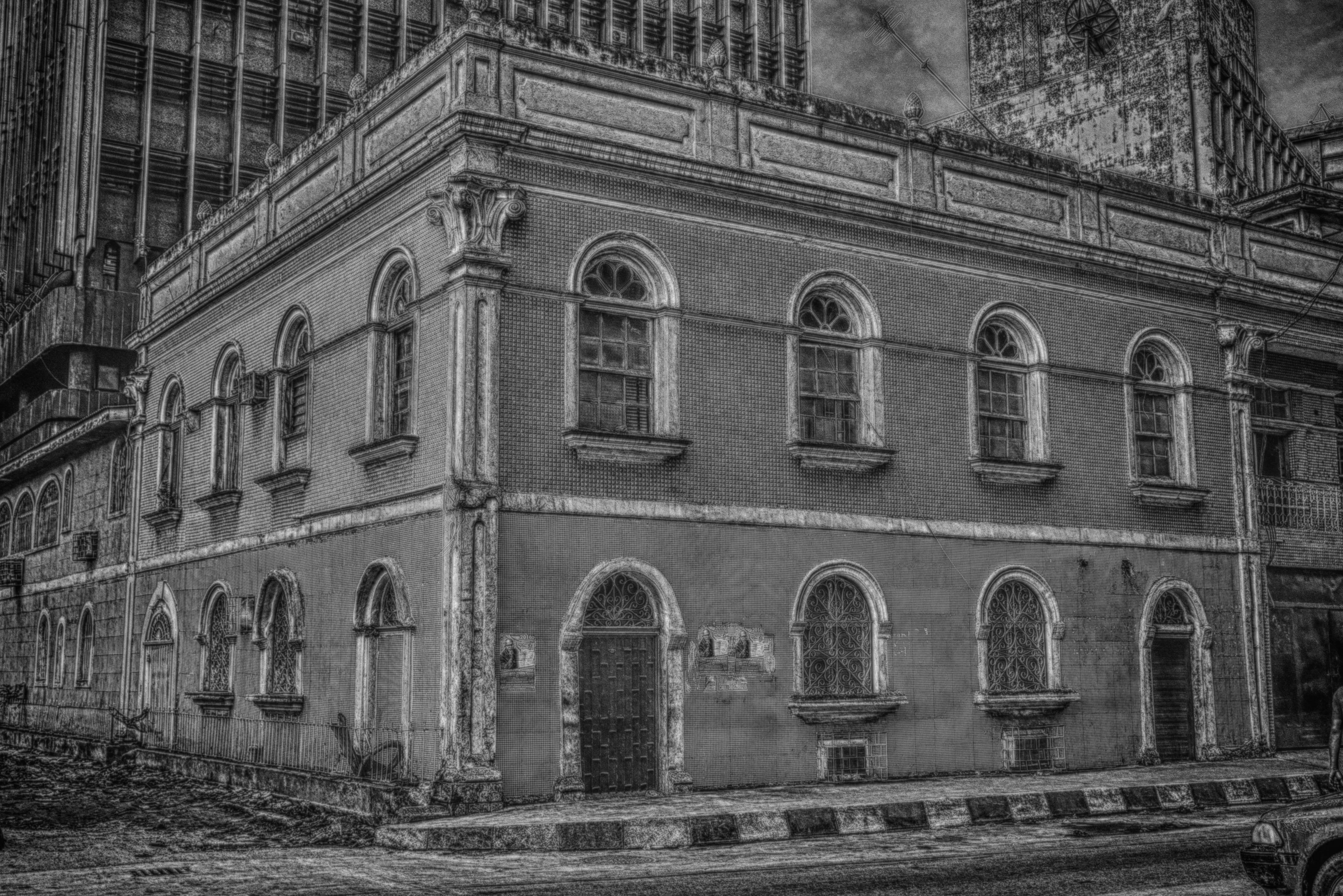

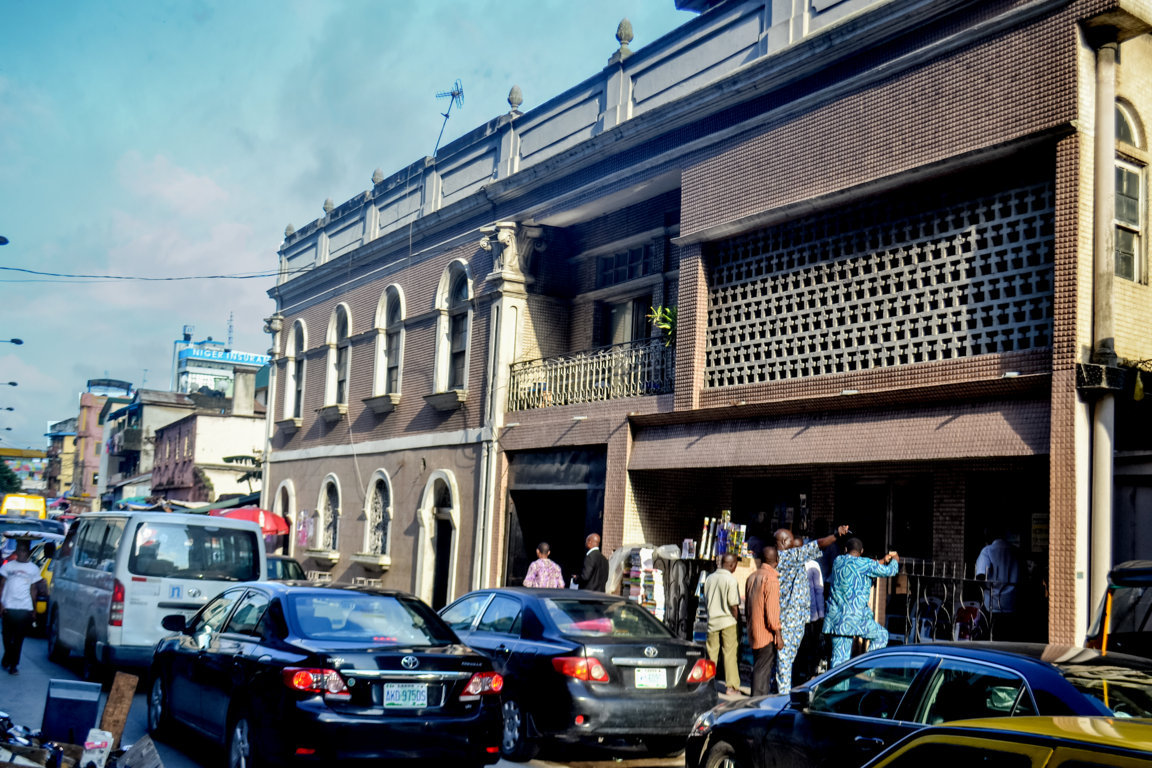

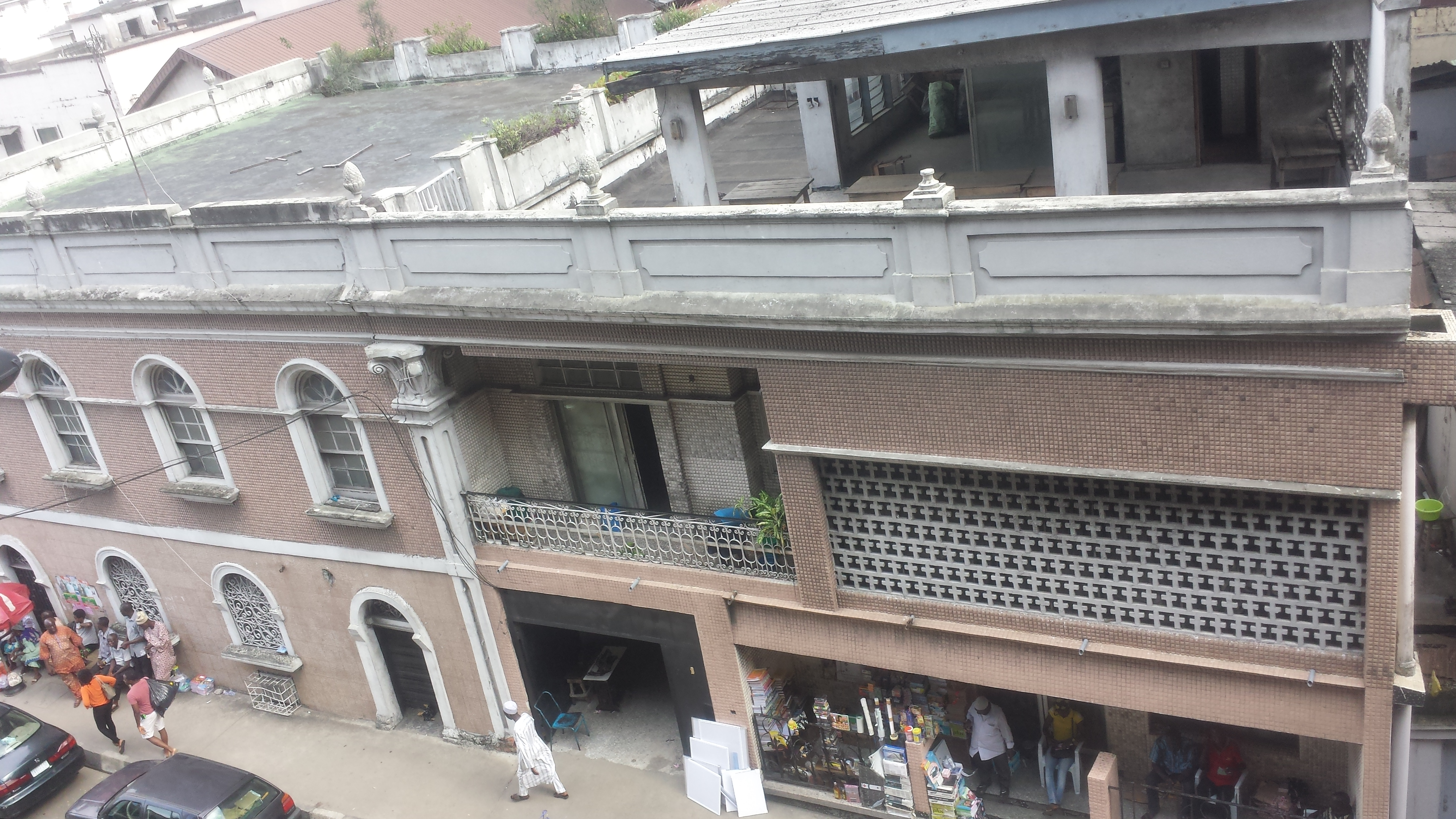

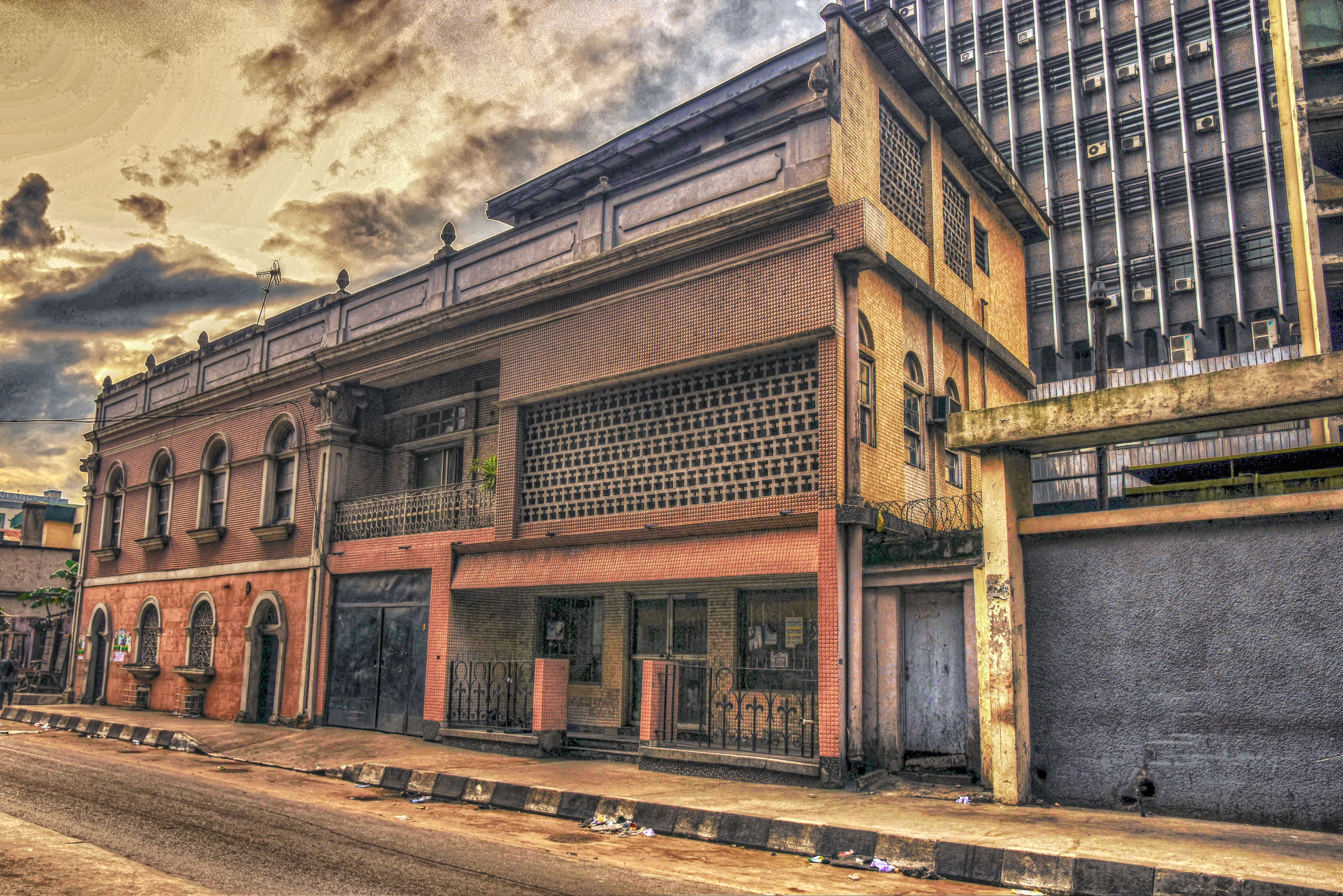

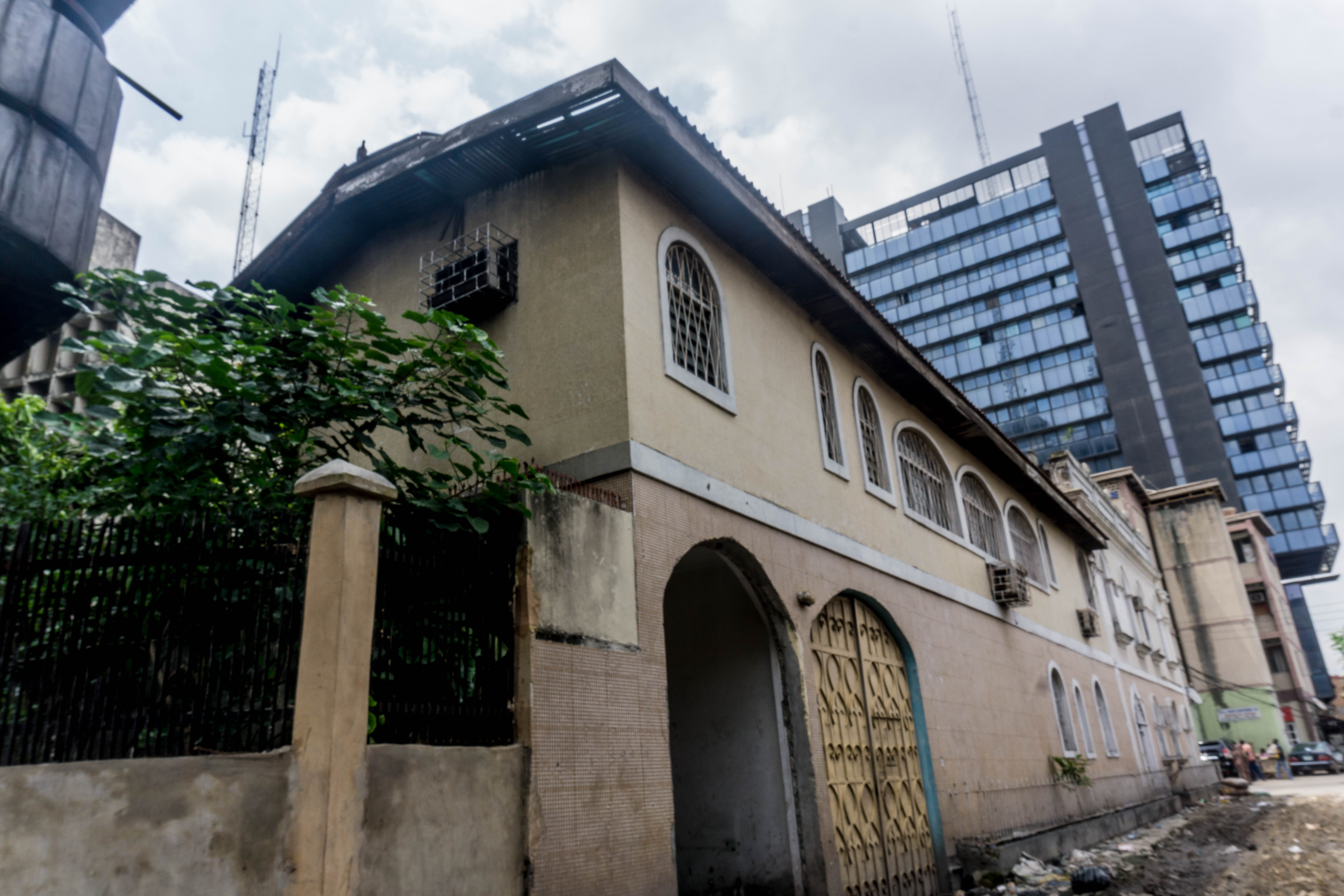

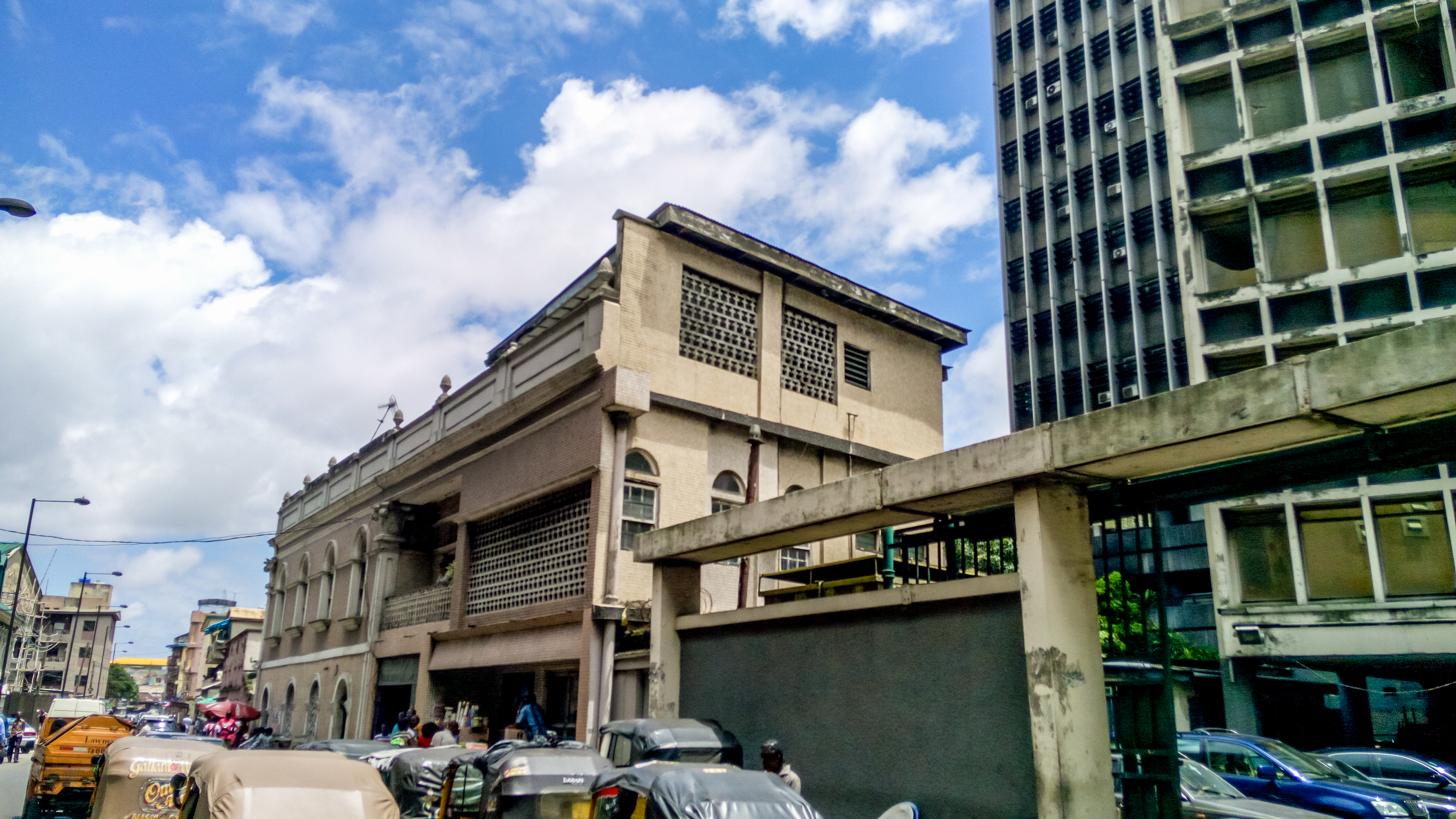
