= Abimbola Omololu-Mulele =

Nigerian lawyer and educationist (died 2009)

Chief Abimbola Omololu-Mulele
- Born: Frederica Abimbola Aina Da Rocha-Afodu
- Died: 2009
- Citizenship: Nigerian
- Education: Trinity College Dublin (Law), Sorbonne (Paris)
- Occupations: Lawyer, educationist
- Known for: Founder of A.D.R.A.O. International School
- Spouse(s): Justice Olusanya Omololu, General Guiome Mulele

Chief Frederica Abimbola Aina Omololu-Mulele (née Da Rocha-Afodu, formerly Omololu, died 2009) was a Nigerian lawyer and educationist. A granddaughter of Chief Candido Da Rocha, she was the founder and proprietress of A.D.R.A.O. International School, an institution that she established in 1963. A member of the Middle Temple, she graduated from Trinity College Dublin; her brother claimed that she was "the first Nigerian female graduate in law to attend the university". She also studied at the Sorbonne in Paris.

She was married twice; her first husband, Justice Olusanya Omololu, was a judicial official and diplomat, while her second husband, General Guiome Mulele, was a military officer.

Chief Omololu-Mulele died in 2009 as a result of a fire accident at her home. Upon her demise, a number of charitable donations were made in her name to various educational causes according to the terms of her will.
