= A.D.R.A.O. International School =

Location
- 28, Ahmadu Bello Way, Victoria Island, Lagos, Lagos State, Nigeria
- Coordinates: 6°25′31.46264″N 3°24′32.70506″E

Information
- School type: International school
- Religious affiliation: Non-denominational
- Established: 1963 (63 years ago)
- Founder: Chief Abimbola Omololu-Mulele
- Grades: Pre-K; Kindergarten; Primary school Secondary school
- Gender: Co-educational
- Language: English; French

A.D.R.A.O. International School is a co-educational international school that was founded in 1963 by Chief Abimbola Omololu-Mulele in Victoria Island, Lagos, Nigeria. It is one of the oldest independent schools in Nigeria.
