= 1959 Nigerian general election =

Parliamentary elections were held in Nigeria on 12 December 1959. The result was a victory for the Northern People's Congress, which won 134 of the 312 seats in the House of Representatives, despite the National Council of Nigeria and the Cameroons and Action Group receiving more votes. It formed a coalition with five other parties and two independents, holding a total of 148 seats.

== Results ==
The Northern People's Congress-led coalition, also consisting of the Mabolaje Grand Alliance, Igala Union, Igbira Tribal Union, Niger Delta Congress and affiliated independents won 148 seats. The National Council of Nigeria and the Cameroons-led coalition, also consisting of the Northern Elements Progressive Union won 89 seats, while the Action Group and affiliated independents won 75 seats.

Party	Votes	%	Seats
National Council of Nigeria and the Cameroons	2,594,577	34.01	81
Action Group	1,992,364	26.12	73
Northern People's Congress	1,922,179	25.20	134
Northern Elements Progressive Union	509,050	6.67	8
Mabolaje Grand Alliance	610,677	8.00	6
Igala Union	610,677	8.00	4
Igbira Tribal Union	610,677	8.00	1
Niger Delta Congress	610,677	8.00	1
AG-affiliated independents	610,677	8.00	2
NPC-affiliated independents	610,677	8.00	2
Total	7,628,847	100.00	312
Registered voters/turnout	9,043,404	–	
Source: Nohlen et al.

=== Northern Region ===
Results of the 1959 Nigerian federal election:

==== Adamawa Province ====
===== Adamawa Division =====
Constituency	Incumbent		Results
Constituency	Incumbent	Party	Candidates
Adamawa Central	Muhammadu Ribadu	NPC	✓ Muhammadu Ribadu (NPC) 62.05%; Samson Nadah (AG) 20.01%; Mohamad Yahya Ahmad (NEPU) 4.51%
Adamawa North East	Ahmadu Maiha	NPC	✓ Ahmadu Maiha (NPC) 27.35%; Abdul Mumuni Mubi (NEPU) 25.09%; Hama Baraya (AG) 14.99%
Adamawa East	Ahmadu Ribadu	NPC	✓ Ahmadu Ribadu (NPC) 51%; Ibrahim Baban Dije (NEPU) 14.92%; Bitrus Bamaka (AG) 14.79%
Adamawa South	Daniel Jenwe	AG	✓ Daniel Jenwe (AG) 54.38%; Isiah M. Fabi (NPC) 25.8%; Mallam Ahmadu (NEPU) 2.16%
Adamawa West	Usman Borkono	NPC	✓ Usman Borkono (NPC) 30.43%; James Ga'anda (NEPU) 26.96%; Nasara Eli Yelemra (AG) 23.66%
Adamawa North West	Albatan Yerima Balla	NEPU	✓ Albatan Yerima Balla (NEPU) 46.07%; Jarafu Multafu (NPC) 28.43%; Ayuba Dunya (AG) 14.58%
Chamba	Philip Maken	AG	✓ Philip Maken (AG) 54.82%; Hammawa Danaba (NPC) 19.46%; Abubakar Gurumpawa (Independent) 2.15%
Cubunawa-Madagali	Umaru Micika Buba	AG	✓ Umaru Micika Buba (AG) 43.67%; Mormoni Bazza (NPC) 22.96%; Garba Buba (NEPU) 4.87%

===== Muri Division =====
Constituency	Incumbent		Results
Constituency	Incumbent	Party	Candidates
Muri North	Umaru Abba Karim	NPC	✓ Umaru Abba Karim (NPC) 39.88%; Musa Sharif (AG) 38.95%; Garba Maisikwati (NEPU) 5%
Muri East	Abdu Kirim	NPC	✓ Abdu Kirim (NPC) 100%; Samailak Wontati (AG) 18.62%; Pin Ishiyaka Baraya (NEPU) 6.91%
Muri South West	Abubakar A Ibrahim	NPC	✓ Abubakar A Ibrahim (NPC) 64.44%; Abubakar Numan Jalingo (AG) 16.7%; Buba Yero Mafindi (NEPU) 2.44%

===== Numan Division =====
Constituency	Incumbent		Results
Constituency	Incumbent	Party	Candidates
Numan	Jonah Assadugu	AG	✓ Jonah Assadugu (AG) 29.16%; Manassah Daniel (Independent) 28.68%; Bappa Shellen (NPC) 24.65%

==== Bauchi Province ====
===== Bauchi Division =====
Constituency	Incumbent		Results
Constituency	Incumbent	Party	Candidates
Bauchi Central	Balarabe Tafawa Balewa	NPC	✓ Balarabe Tafawa Balewa (NPC) 43.07%; Muhammadu Gidado (NEPU) 24.05%; Muhammadu Balarabe (AG) 9.32%
Bauchi North East	Mohammed Sani Abubakar	NPC	✓ Mohammed Sani Abubakar (NPC) 65.28%; Inusa Darazo (NEPU) 11.63%; Maigari Sade (Independent) 7.59%
Bauchi South East	Alhaji Adamu	NPC	✓ Alhaji Adamu (NPC) 51.54%; Hassan Kosashshe (NEPU) 15.65%; Ibrahim Dimis (AG) 13.24%
Bauchi South West	Abubakar Tafawa Balewa	NPC	✓ Abubakar Tafawa Balewa (NPC) 48.34%; Azi Nyako Dan Izang (AG) 33.88%; Sule (NEPU) 2.42%
Bauchi North West	Muhammed Ningi	NPC	✓ Muhammed Ningi (NPC) 36.63%; Mai-Jama'a Umaru (NEPU) 15.22%; Yunusa Ningi (Independent) 13.27%

===== Gombe Division =====
Constituency	Incumbent		Results
Constituency	Incumbent	Party	Candidates
Ako	Muhammadu Kumo	NPC	✓ Muhammadu Kumo (NPC) 54.77%; Sani Yakubu (NEPU) 13.86%; Muhammadu Miji Kumo (Independent) 10.18%
Duku-Kwami	Abdulkadir Dukku	NPC	✓ Abdulkadir Dukku (NPC) 50.55%; Inuwa Arab (NEPU) 15.97%; Babagoro (Independent) 12.53%
Gombe Central	Ibrahim Jalo Waziri	NPC	✓ Ibrahim Jalo Waziri (NPC) 37.78%; Pela Ali Deba (Independent) 24.62%; Alhaji Shehu (NEPU) 14.77%
Nafada	Hamza Gombe	NPC	✓ Hamza Gombe (NPC) 50.27%; A. Kari Bajoga (NEPU) 25.16%; Jauro Gombe (Independent) 11.39%
Tangale Waja	Bulus Biliyong	AG	✓ Bulus Biliyong (AG) 44.43%; Shehu Awak (NEPU) 25.77%; Abdul Kadiri Mona (NPC) 15.84%

===== Katagum Division =====
Constituency	Incumbent		Results
Constituency	Incumbent	Party	Candidates
Katagum North East	Shekarau Omar	NPC	✓ Shekarau Omar (NPC) 51.39%; Bappa Aliyu (NEPU) 19.36%; Garba Mohammed Azare (AG) 15.6%
Katagum South	Abdulkadir Abubakar	NPC	✓ Abdulkadir Abubakar (NPC) 52.89%; Adamu Abubakar (NEPU) 26.1%; Sarkin Rini (AG) 2.96%
Katagum West	Muhammadu Sagir Umar	NPC	✓ Muhammadu Sagir Umar (NPC) 63%; Abdu Wuri Azare (NEPU) 20.46%; Sagir Dan Alhaji Adamamu Arabic (AG) 3.2%
Misau	Muhammadu Kura	NPC	✓ Muhammadu Kura (NPC) 57.24%; Adamu Abubakar Jajire (NEPU) 26.05%; Idi Sangaya (AG) 6.36%

==== Benue Province ====
===== Idoma Division =====
Constituency	Incumbent		Results
Constituency	Incumbent	Party	Candidates
Idoma North	J. O. Ede	NPC	✓ J. O. Ede (NPC) 33.86%; Abdu Sule (Independent) 22.58%; Ogwiji Ikongbe (AG) 17.28%
Idoma South East	J. C. Obande	NPC	✓ J. C. Obande (NPC) 40.91%; J. E. Aboganye (AG) 31.83%; J. O. Idikwu (NCNC) 15.76%
Idoma West	E. A. Odo	NPC	✓ E. A. Odo (NPC) 56.3%; C. Ogbonah (NCNC) 12.43%; A. O. Aba (Independent) 10.11%

===== Lafia Division =====
Constituency	Incumbent		Results
Constituency	Incumbent	Party	Candidates
Lafia	Ahmadu Angara Doma	AG	✓ Ahmadu Angara Doma (AG) 44.91%; Muhammadu Ubangari (NPC) 26.52%; Yahaya Sabo (NEPU) 15.82%

===== Nasarawa Division =====
Constituency	Incumbent		Results
Constituency	Incumbent	Party	Candidates
Keffi	A. A. Ramalan	NPC	✓ A. A. Ramalan (NPC) 46.41%; J. I. Karu (AG) 33.03%; Sani Umaru (NEPU) 8.51%
Nasarawa	Zubairu Bamu	NPC	✓ Zubairu Bamu (NPC) 46.99%; S. Madaki (AG) 15.69%; Abdu Ibro (NEPU) 13.98%

===== Tiv Division =====
Constituency	Incumbent		Results
Constituency	Incumbent	Party	Candidates
Gaav-Shangev Tiev	S. T. Daka	AG	✓ S. T. Daka (AG) 88.8%; V. A. Kyagh (NPC) 3.98%; A. T. Korinya (NCNC) 3.92%
Iharev-Masev	V. T. Shisha	AG	✓ V. T. Shisha (AG) 66.31%; P. T. Kpagh (NPC) 24.91%; S. C. Yough (Independent) 4.2%
Iharev-Nongov	P. Tarkende	AG	✓ P. Tarkende (AG) 54.46%; Ayem Bem (NPC) 19.45%; M. K. Upaa (NCNC) 13.86%
Jemgbar	Joseph Tarka	AG	✓ Joseph Tarka (AG) 93.37%; J. I. Ukume (NPC) 3.25%; S. C. Surma (NCNC) 1.92%
Kunav	M. D. Iyorkar	AG	✓ M. D. Iyorkar (AG) 85.93%; C. A. Suwe (NPC) 5.16%; R. A. Dowgo (MBSP) 1.66%
Kwande	K. Swem	AG	✓ K. Swem (AG) 81.24%; H. O. Abaagu (NPC) 4.57%; D. A. Tor (Independent) 3.38%
Ukum-Shitire	E. T. Orodi	AG	✓ E. T. Orodi (AG) 80.94%; G. A. Atedze (NPC) 8.91%; A. T. Nor (Independent) 3.34%

===== Wukari Division =====
Constituency	Incumbent		Results
Constituency	Incumbent	Party	Candidates
Wukari	Tangul Gaza	AG	✓ Tangul Gaza (AG) 54.84%; I. S. Usman (NPC) 33.76%; H. A. Donga (NEPU) 7.56%

==== Bornu Province ====
===== Bedde Division =====
Constituency	Incumbent		Results
Constituency	Incumbent	Party	Candidates
Bedde	Maina Saleh	NPC	✓ Maina Saleh (NPC) 76.04%; Ibrahim Kaitafi (NEPU) 17.11%; Gambuwet Dan Kaku (AG) 1.1%

===== Biu Division =====
Constituency	Incumbent		Results
Constituency	Incumbent	Party	Candidates
Biu North	Sule Abba Biu	NPC	✓ Sule Abba Biu (NPC) 57.24%; G. Ali Diwar (NEPU) 21.68%; B. Alli Zanzo (AG) 9.55%
Biu South	Balang U. Barami	NPC	✓ Balang U. Barami (NPC) 38.54%; T. A. Yowa (Independent) 14.51%; S. O. Gamka (Independent) 7.64%

===== Bornu Division =====
Constituency	Incumbent		Results
Constituency	Incumbent	Party	Candidates
Auno-Magumeri	Abba Sadiq	NPC	✓ Abba Sadiq (NPC) 93%; Maazu (AG) 3.18%
Bornu North	Muktar Gajiram	NPC	✓ Muktar Gajiram (NPC) 90.15%; Alhaji Mala (AG) 4.36%
Bornu North West	Galadima Mai Kiyari	NPC	✓ Galadima Mai Kiyari (NPC) 74.01%; Sanni Jalaba (NEPU) 12.23%; Usman Yahaya (AG) 3.6%
Borsari-Damaturu	Baba Shehu Ibrahim	NPC	✓ Baba Shehu Ibrahim (NPC) 78.06%; Muhammadu Sherif (NEPU) 3.55%; Lantaiwa (AG) 0.97%
Chad	Zanna Isa Monguno	NPC	✓ Zanna Isa Monguno (NPC) 89.01%; Uje (AG) 2.11%
Fune-Gujba	Musa Hindi	NPC	✓ Musa Hindi (NPC) 80.43%; Dalti Ngelzarma (NEPU) 9.19%; Bukar Geruba (AG) 1.12%
Geidam	Maaji Kachalla Baiko	NPC	✓ Maaji Kachalla Baiko (NPC) 68.88%; Audu Aljimate (NEPU) 11.47%; Bukar Maliki (AG) 8.66%
Kaga-Marghi	Shettima Ali Monguno	NPC	✓ Shettima Ali Monguno (NPC) 83.19%; Bitrus (AG) 11.84%
Konduga-Mafa	Waziri Ibrahim	NPC	✓ Waziri Ibrahim (NPC) 85.86%; Bukar Marna (AG) 5.6%
Yerwa	Zanna Bukar Dipcharima	NPC	✓ Zanna Bukar Dipcharima (NPC) 71.78%; Sherif Dikwa (NEPU) 10.86%; Alhaji Sherif (AG) 6.37%

===== Dikwa Division =====
Constituency	Incumbent		Results
Constituency	Incumbent	Party	Candidates
Dikwa Central	Kalia Monguno	NPC	✓ Kalia Monguno (NPC) 53.81%; Ibrahim Imam (AG) 24.94%; Mustapha (NEPU) 5.13%
Dikwa North	Abba Mallam Terab	NPC	✓ Abba Mallam Terab (NPC) 57.39%; Garba Kafinta (AG) 22.68%; Kura Dinwa (NEPU) 2.59%

===== Potiskum Division =====
Constituency	Incumbent		Results
Constituency	Incumbent	Party	Candidates
Gwoza	Abdullahi Gwoza	AG	✓ Abdullahi Gwoza (AG) 41.88%; Salihu Warke (NPC) 20.79%; Abdullahi Ngoshe (NEPU) 10.76%
Potiskum	Maina Waziri	NPC	✓ Maina Waziri (NPC) 53.7%; Lamin Sanusi (NEPU) 20.2%; Mai Samari Usuman (AG) 1.33%

==== Ilorin Province ====
===== Borgu Division =====
Constituency	Incumbent		Results
Constituency	Incumbent	Party	Candidates
Borgu	Yusufu Ilesha	NPC	✓ Yusufu Ilesha (NPC) 67.07%; Abdullahi Tabe (AG) 15.27%

===== Ilorin Division =====
Constituency	Incumbent		Results
Constituency	Incumbent	Party	Candidates
Ilorin Central	S. A. Babatunde	NPC	✓ S. A. Babatunde (NPC) 52.23%; R. A. Akande (AG) 32.64%; Alhaji Panni (NCNC) 1.55%
Ilorin North	Abdulsalami Olomoda	NPC	✓ Abdulsalami Olomoda (NPC) 48.28%; A. A. E. Ajayi (AG) 32.22%; M. O. Odebode (NCNC) 5.35%
Ilorin East	M. A. O. Olarewaju	NPC	✓ M. A. O. Olarewaju (NPC) 43.12%; J. T. Abaoche (AG) 31.14%; M. A. Ojo (AG) 4.3%
Ilorin South	P. B. Olatunde	AG	✓ P. B. Olatunde (AG) 45.08%; Alhaji Sulaiman (NPC) 37.98%; O. N. Aside (NCNC) 0.57%

===== Lafiagi-Pategi Division =====
Constituency	Incumbent		Results
Constituency	Incumbent	Party	Candidates
Lafiagi-Pategi	Muhammadu Koro	NPC	✓ Muhammadu Koro (NPC) 73.76%; Zubairu Shonga (AG) 12.52%; Salaru (NEPU) 3.84%

==== Kabba Province ====
===== Igala Division =====
Constituency	Incumbent		Results
Constituency	Incumbent	Party	Candidates
Igala North East	P. O. Tokula	Independent	✓ P. O. Tokula (Independent) 63.34%; A. O. Ekele (NPC) 18.41%; A. O. Adrew (AG) 3.3%
Igala East	H. M. Adaji	Independent	✓ H. M. Adaji (Independent) 56.44%; A. Y. Amadu (NPC) 21.51%; J. A. Amodu (NEPU) 3.52%
Igala South	D. O. Enefola	Independent	✓ D. O. Enefola (Independent) 48.86%; B. A. Obaje (NPC) 24.72%; A. Gbobe (NEPU) 6.95%
Igala North West	J. A. Yacim	Independent	✓ J. A. Yacim (Independent) 60.53%; J. A. Olokun (NPC) 24.15%; Umaru Amedu (AG) 4.43%

===== Igbirra Division =====
Constituency	Incumbent		Results
Constituency	Incumbent	Party	Candidates
Igbirra	Salihu O. Abdul	Independent	✓ Salihu O. Abdul (Independent) 47.2%; J. A. G. Ohiani (NPC) 40.62%; M. O. Agoi (AG) 2.41%

===== Kabba Division =====
Constituency	Incumbent		Results
Constituency	Incumbent	Party	Candidates
Kabba	S. A. Olukotun	NPC	✓ S. A. Olukotun (NPC) 50.94%; D. S. Moody (AG) 15.88%; J. A. Tolufase (NEPU) 5.23%

===== Kwara Division =====
Constituency	Incumbent		Results
Constituency	Incumbent	Party	Candidates
Kwara	Usman Angulu Ahmed	NPC	✓ Usman Angulu Ahmed (NPC) 76.98%; Muhammadu Karaworo (NEPU) 7.8%; L. Muhammadu Dadi (AG) 3.32%

==== Kaduna Capital Territory ====
Constituency	Incumbent		Results
Constituency	Incumbent	Party	Candidates
Kaduna	Zakari Isa	NPC	✓ Zakari Isa (NPC) 39.49%; Yahaya Abdullahi (NEPU) 36.97%; S. Kazzah (AG) 8.56%

==== Kano Province ====
===== Kano Division =====
Constituency	Incumbent		Results
Constituency	Incumbent	Party	Candidates
Babura-Garki	Kabiru Bayero	NPC	✓ Kabiru Bayero (NPC) 82.62%; D. Dangalan (NEPU) 8.56%; Ado Kofar Mata (AG) 1.92%
Bici East	Bello Farar Hula Bichi	NPC	✓ Bello Farar Hula Bichi (NPC) 84.86%; Lawan Maiturare (NEPU) 7.84%; Yaro Bici (AG) 1.7%
Bici West	Mamudu Bayero	NPC	✓ Mamudu Bayero (NPC) 88.69%; Nura Dantata (NEPU) 5.7%; Kamaye Bici (AG) 2.25%
Birnin Kudu	Datti Kudu	NPC	✓ Datti Kudu (NPC) 73.59%; Sani Danwanka (NEPU) 15.58%; Sule Ahmadu (AG) 3.74%
Dambatta	Mohammed Muhtari	NPC	✓ Mohammed Muhtari (NPC) 89.1%; M. N. Zakariyau (NEPU) 6.34%; Nuhu Alliu (AG) 0.59%
Dawakin Kudu	Rilwanu Abdullahi	NPC	✓ Rilwanu Abdullahi (NPC) 71.57%; Muhtar Kura (NEPU) 8.43%; A. Dawakin Kudu (AG) 1.22%
Dawakin Tofa East	Usman Shehu Kazaure	NPC	✓ Usman Shehu Kazaure (NPC) 85.98%; Ali Galadima (NEPU) 6.52%; Bala Amani (AG) 0.85%
Dawakin Tofa West	Maitama Sule	NPC	✓ Maitama Sule (NPC) 87.8%; M. A. Ibrahim (NEPU) 10.27%; A. dan Alhaji Abba (AG) 1.42%
Dutse East	Umaru Gumel	NPC	✓ Umaru Gumel (NPC) 83.42%; Babanliya Manaja (NEPU) 7.5%; Dan Goda (AG) 3.56%
Dutse West	Aminu Suleiman Dutse	NPC	✓ Aminu Suleiman Dutse (NPC) 81.41%; dan Audu (AG) 6.25%; Shehu Abdu (NEPU) 5.24%
Gabasawa	Abubakar Bayero	NPC	✓ Abubakar Bayero (NPC) 84.26%; Ibrahim Yakuba (NEPU) 7.81%; Soba Mamman (AG) 1.76%
Gaya North	Inusa	NPC	✓ Inusa (NPC) 69.23%; Gwadabe (NEPU) 16.5%; A. Maiunguwa (AG) 3.2%
Gaya South	Sarki Dalhatu Yola	NPC	✓ Sarki Dalhatu Yola (NPC) 83.77%; Bello (NEPU) 6.93%; Ali G. Kanti (AG) 1.87%
Gezawa	Sani Gezawa	NPC	✓ Sani Gezawa (NPC) 80.89%; Shehu Daneji Kano (NEPU) 7.1%; Musa Minista (AG) 1.24%
Gwaram	Hamidu Bayero	NPC	✓ Hamidu Bayero (NPC) 67.11%; A. B. Metteden (NEPU) 15.73%; Kankarofi (AG) 7.54%
Gwarzo East	Bello Dandago	NPC	✓ Bello Dandago (NPC) 80.41%; Sani Gwarzo (NEPU) 12.84%; D. Lawan (AG) 1.69%
Gwarzo West	Ali Gwarzo	NPC	✓ Ali Gwarzo (NPC) 61.45%; Alhaji Maikano (NEPU) 29.94%; Nafari Gobir (AG) 2.13%
Jahun	A. A. Koguna	NPC	✓ A. A. Koguna (NPC) 70.5%; Ahmadu Trader (NEPU) 17.07%; H. M. dan Alhaji (AG) 1.95%
Kano East	Aminu Kano	NEPU	✓ Aminu Kano (NPC) 53.05%; Sani Ungogo (NPC) 29.39%; Jamilu Dantata (AG) 5.37%
Kano West	Ahmadu A. Baba	NPC	✓ Ahmadu A. Baba (NPC) 60.4%; S. Satatima Kano (NEPU) 28.95%; Umaru Hadejia (AG) 0.42%
Karaye	Muhammadu Gwarzo	NPC	✓ Muhammadu Gwarzo (NPC) 55.71%; S. A. Tanko Yakasai (NEPU) 36.89%; Jarno na Serikin Karaye (AG) 2.63%
Kiru	Usman Gwarzo	NPC	✓ Usman Gwarzo (NPC) 68.51%; Yusuf Hadejia (NEPU) 24.95%; Abdulkadir Galadima (AG) 1.44%
Kumbotso-Ungogo	Sarki Abbas Sanusi	NPC	✓ Sarki Abbas Sanusi (NPC) 86.48%; Garba Dalla (NEPU) 3.13%; Adamu Giginyu (AG) 0.42%
Kura	Muhammadu Gwate	NPC	✓ Muhammadu Gwate (NPC) 70.47%; Mohamed Sani Darma (NEPU) 25.42%; Gora no Adan Baki (AG) 1.8%
Minjibir	Baba Danbappa	NPC	✓ Baba Danbappa (NPC) 82.87%; Uba Na Alkasin (NEPU) 7.28%; Garuba Kunyan (AG) 4.27%
Rano	Mohamed-Munir	NPC	✓ Mohamed-Munir (NPC) 79.15%; Ibrahim Rajab Heebah (NEPU) 12.35%; Alhaji Kanwa dan Audu (AG) 1.72%
Ringim	Saiyadi Ringim	NPC	✓ Saiyadi Ringim (NPC) 56.18%; Babba (NEPU) 38.08%; Audu Nana Daiyabu (AG) 3.53%
Sumaila	Muhammadu Inuwa Wada	NPC	✓ Muhammadu Inuwa Wada (NPC) 83.05%; Mohammed Achimolo Garba (NEPU) 7.09%; Sule Bala (AG) 1.45%
Tudun Wada	Muhtari Wanbai	NPC	✓ Muhtari Wanbai (NPC) 67.77%; Shehu Ahmed Muhammadu (NEPU) 18.43%; Ibrahim Issa (AG) 2.08%
Wudil	Abba Wudil	NPC	✓ Abba Wudil (NPC) 74.51%; Abdulkadir A. Danjaji (NEPU) 11.02%; Bello Wudil (AG) 2.84%
Kazaure	Ibrahim Na Maitama	Independent	✓ Ibrahim Na Maitama (Independent) 64.36%; Alhaji Ibrahim (NPC) 20.31%; Musa Disina (NEPU) 3.03%

===== Kano Northern Division =====
Constituency	Incumbent		Results
Constituency	Incumbent	Party	Candidates
Gumel East	Ahmadu Babandi	NPC	✓ Ahmadu Babandi (NPC) 58.52%; Ali Kote (NEPU) 23.57%; Yahaya Adamu (AG) 6.16%
Gumel West	Aliyu Muhammadu	NPC	✓ Aliyu Muhammadu (NPC) 56.59%; Kassim Tela (NEPU) 19.9%; Abubakar Saba (AG) 13.02%
Hadejia North	Muhammadu Gauyamma	NPC	✓ Muhammadu Gauyamma (NPC) 55.64%; Ali Abdullah (NEPU) 21.98%; Lawal Dawanta (AG) 12.13%
Hadejia South	Abdulkadir Maidugu	NPC	✓ Abdulkadir Maidugu (NPC) 56.67%; Muhammadu Dangani (NEPU) 23.96%; Juji Dambata (AG) 10.18%

==== Katsina Province ====
===== Katsina Division =====
Constituency	Incumbent		Results
Constituency	Incumbent	Party	Candidates
Daura East	Saidu Daura	NPC	✓ Saidu Daura (NPC) 62.57%; Abdu Danbabaye (NEPU) 15.34%; Leku Madabu (AG) 14.02%
Daura West	Haruna	NPC	✓ Haruna (NPC) 54.05%; Maidaura (Independent) 25.24%; Haro Na Ashura (AG) 6.41%
Danja	Ibrahim Nadabo	NPC	✓ Ibrahim Nadabo (NPC) 49.18%; Sabiru Katsina (NEPU) 42.14%; Mummuni Na Mallam Jamo (AG) 2.45%
Dan Yusufa-Kaura	Damale Kaita	NPC	✓ Damale Kaita (NPC) 57.43%; Abdun Sani (NEPU) 21.08%; Kado Charanci (AG) 14.01%
Durbi	Iro Mani	NPC	✓ Iro Mani (NPC) 58.56%; Lawal Abdu (AG) 21.34%; Sani Tailor Katsina (NEPU) 6.84%
Ingawa-Kankiya	Dambo Ibrahim Maikaita	NPC	✓ Dambo Ibrahim Maikaita (NPC) 59.59%; Danjuma Kankia (NEPU) 25.45%; Abu Kankia (AG) 5.14%
Jibiya-Kaita	Ibrahim Ladan Fari	NPC	✓ Ibrahim Ladan Fari (NPC) 66.83%; Garba Jibia (AG) 11%; Ladan Amo Malumfashi (NEPU) 10.48%
Kankara-Kogo	Wada Nas	NEPU	✓ Wada Nas (NEPU) 42.71%; Hassan Rafindadi (NPC) 41.77%; Nalado Unguwar Dan Dutse (AG) 6.89%
Katsina Central	Musa Yar'Adua	NPC	✓ Musa Yar'Adua (NPC) 64.42%; Mahaman Rabe (Independent) 13.93%; Sanda Kaita (NEPU) 11.54%
Malumfashi	Abdullahi Mahuta	NPC	✓ Abdullahi Mahuta (NPC) 65.74%; Amadu Danaiamu (NEPU) 22.46%; Garbe Yanmama (AG) 3.51%
Marusa-Mashi	Iro Mashi	NPC	✓ Iro Mashi (NPC) 71.65%; Dardau Funtua (NEPU) 17.53%; Mommon Nasir (AG) 6.38%
Maska	L. Alhaji Daura	NPC	✓ L. Alhaji Daura (NPC) 50.75%; Bello M. B. K. (NEPU) 36.55%; Jamo Na Mummuni (AG) 3.63%
Musawa	Abdullahi Magajin Musawa	NPC	✓ Abdullahi Magajin Musawa (NPC) 63.74%; Abdu Dandiga (NEPU) 15.8%; Adamu Kira (AG) 9.76%
Ruma-Tsaskiya	Abubakar Magajin Gari	NPC	✓ Abubakar Magajin Gari (NPC) 38.08%; J. W. Garba (AG) 32.1%; Lawal Nabola (NEPU) 20.74%
Yandaka	Bala Muhammadu Dutsinma	NPC	✓ Bala Muhammadu Dutsinma (NPC) 48.85%; Tijjani Funtua (NEPU) 31.12%; Rabo Kurfi (AG) 12.47%

==== Niger Province ====
===== Abuja Division =====
Constituency	Incumbent		Results
Constituency	Incumbent	Party	Candidates
Abuja	Aliyu Bisalla	NPC	✓ Aliyu Bisalla (NPC) 69.36%; Naroka Dauda Diko (AG) 17.88%; Muhammadu Ladan (NEPU) 4.98%

===== Bida Division =====
Constituency	Incumbent		Results
Constituency	Incumbent	Party	Candidates
Bida East	Ibrahim Tako	NPC	✓ Ibrahim Tako (NPC) 69.73%; Abubakar Zukogi (NEPU) 19.48%; S. Yabagi Bida (AG) 2.93%
Bida West	Usman Sarki	NPC	✓ Usman Sarki (NPC) 69.16%; Usman Bida (NEPU) 20.51%; Abubakar Zukogi (AG) 2.87%

===== Kontagora Division =====
Constituency	Incumbent		Results
Constituency	Incumbent	Party	Candidates
Kontagora Central	Abdu Bauchi	NPC	✓ Abdu Bauchi (NPC) 46.69%; B. Muhammadu Bida (NEPU) 23.29%; Maikundi (AG) 10.77%
Kontagora South East	Usman Turaki	NPC	✓ Usman Turaki (NPC) 51%; Barau Auna (AG) 17.21%; Abdu Rafingora (NEPU) 13.4%
Zuru	Isa Iko	Independent	✓ Isa Iko (Independent) 33.66%; Hassan Zuru (NPC) 32.51%; Ibrahim Audu Tadugra (NEPU) 10.34%

===== Minna Division =====
Constituency	Incumbent		Results
Constituency	Incumbent	Party	Candidates
Minna North	Umaru Galkogo	NPC	✓ Umaru Galkogo (NPC) 69.45%; Hamisu Na Bawa Minna (NEPU) 12.08%; B. Maikeke Pandogari (AG) 7.63%
Minna South	Garba	NPC	✓ Garba (NPC) 64.11%; Ibun Yunusa (NEPU) 13.3%; Shittu Paiko (AG) 4.35%

==== Plateau Province ====
===== Akwanga (Southern) Division =====
Constituency	Incumbent		Results
Constituency	Incumbent	Party	Candidates
Akwanga	Yakubu Allanana	NPC	✓ Yakubu Allanana (NPC) 29.5%; Iliya Dan Rini (AG) 27.91%; Ali Ubandoma (Independent) 13.34%

===== Jos Division =====
Constituency	Incumbent		Results
Constituency	Incumbent	Party	Candidates
Jos Central	Ismaila Abdullahi Bici	NEPU	✓ Ismaila Abdullahi Bici (NEPU) 39.26%; Abdu Gobezan-tashi (NPC) 31.28%; Tengwong Taki Kwa (AG) 15%
Jos South	Isa Haruna	NPC	✓ Isa Haruna (NPC) 43.59%; P. M. Dokotri (AG) 34.45%; Saadu Shaiman (NEPU) 13.45%
Jos North West	Abubakar Isandu	AG	✓ Abubakar Isandu (AG) 43.11%; Timoni Kadaki (NPC) 35.96%; Muhammadu Oma (NEPU) 13.04%

===== Lowland (Shendam) Division =====
Constituency	Incumbent		Results
Constituency	Incumbent	Party	Candidates
Lowland East	S. D. Lar	AG	✓ S. D. Lar (AG) 47.34%; S. Muhammadu Gonto (NPC) 35.8%; Audu Bawa (NEPU) 7.91%
Lowland West	G. Yilgwen	AG	✓ G. Yilgwen (AG) 70.72%; Magwen Nyelong (NPC) 25.11%; L. J. S. Longpuan Kwande (NEPU) 16.5%

===== Pankshin Division =====
Constituency	Incumbent		Results
Constituency	Incumbent	Party	Candidates
Angas	D. Dimka	AG	✓ D. Dimka (AG) 52.2%; Malachias Bawa (NPC) 34.65%; Abokin Malam (NEPU) 3.04%
Kanam	Aliyu Zungum	NPC	✓ Aliyu Zungum (NPC) 50.47%; Yakubu P. Kanam (AG) 32.55%; Idi Abubakar (NEPU) 10.77%
Pankshin West	J. M. Damla	AG	✓ J. M. Damla (AG) 58.91%; A. A. Maren (NPC) 30.2%; K. Adakara (NEPU) 3.56%

==== Sokoto Province ====
===== Argungu Division =====
Constituency	Incumbent		Results
Constituency	Incumbent	Party	Candidates
Argungu East	Mohammed Bello	NPC	✓ Mohammed Bello (NPC) 61.65%; M. Arzika (NEPU) 25.3%; Manu Dan Ali (AG) 3.81%
Argungu West	Garba Kangiwa	NPC	✓ Garba Kangiwa (NPC) 55.62%; Alu Maisaurare (NEPU) 17.67%; Adamun Godi Kisra (AG) 9.63%

===== Gwandu Division =====
Constituency	Incumbent		Results
Constituency	Incumbent	Party	Candidates
Gwandu North	Umaru Dan Waziri	NPC	✓ Umaru Dan Waziri (NPC) 71.64%; Bello Birnin Kebbi (AG) 9.33%; Umaru Safiya (NEPU) 3.08%
Gwandu East	Haliru Gwandu	NPC	✓ Haliru Gwandu (NPC) 60.2%; Sa'adu Jega (NEPU) 20%; Haliru Da'aje (AG) 3.33%
Gwandu South	Muhammadu Kaoje I	NPC	✓ Muhammadu Kaoje I (NPC) 62.67%; Umaru Dan Hoto Kalgo (NEPU) 15.2%; Sahabi Dan Aliu (AG) 9.42%
Gwandu West	Usumanu Maitambari	NPC	✓ Usumanu Maitambari (NPC) 69.12%; Husaini Zariya Kalakala (NEPU) 14.29%; Aliyu Gwandu (AG) 4.3%
Yauri	Aminu Yelwa	NPC	✓ Aminu Yelwa (NPC) 58.16%; Abubakar (NEPU) 17.38%; Garba Dan Usman (AG) 8.03%

===== Sokoto Division =====
Constituency	Incumbent		Results
Constituency	Incumbent	Party	Candidates
Binji-Tangaza	Aminu Tafida	NPC	✓ Aminu Tafida (NPC) 88%; Maiwurno Tela Sokoto (NEPU) 2.31%; Garba Danturu (AG) 1.84%
Chafe-Gusau	Muhammadu Nalado	NEPU	✓ Muhammadu Nalado (NEPU) 46.7%; Muazu Gusau (NPC) 40.43%; Ali Dogo Dan Usman (AG) 3.79%
Dange-Shuni	Aliyu	NPC	✓ Aliyu (NPC) 86.75%; Arzika Bodinga (NEPU) 4.59%; Bello Yamai (AG) 1.52%
Gada	Garba Gada	NPC	✓ Garba Gada (NPC) 85.47%; Ashini Gadabo (NEPU) 2.41%; M. Lawal (AG) 0.62%
Gandi-Goronyo	Shehu Na Ita Sokoto	NPC	✓ Shehu Na Ita Sokoto (NPC) 70.02%; Isa Malam Maialawa (NEPU) 15.6%; Yahaya Sarkin Gabas (Independent) 3.05%
Gwadabawa North	Muhammadu Zaiyana	NPC	✓ Muhammadu Zaiyana (NPC) 81.17%; Alu Marina Sokoto (AG) 2.84%; Aliyu Darna Sokoto(NEPU) 1.59%
Gwadabawa South	Mohammed Bello Abdur-raman	NPC	✓ Mohammed Bello Abdur-raman (NPC) 83.94%; Ali Gandanga Tela (NEPU) 1.29%; R. Dorowa (AG) 1.01%
Isa	Ladan Isa	NPC	✓ Ladan Isa (NPC) 43.87%; Madugu Isa (NEPU) 32.5%; Rabo Dan Malam Shinkafa (AG) 7.07%
Kaura Namoda	Ali Nakura Kaura	NEPU	✓ Ali Nakura Kaura (NEPU) 44.78%; Alhaji Nakazalle (NPC) 38.93%; Nadada Dan Umaru (AG) 2.94%
Maradun	Atto Bungudu	NPC	✓ Atto Bungudu (NPC) 62.93%; Sani Dan M. Jibo (AG) 16.29%; Muhammadu Dodo (NEPU) 8.42%
Moriki-Zurmi	Alhaji Muhammadu	NPC	✓ Alhaji Muhammadu (NPC) 60.24%; Sani Dan Koli (NEPU) 25.24%; Rafi Dan Bako (AG) 5.81%
Rabah-Wurno	Ahmadu Danbaba	NPC	✓ Ahmadu Danbaba (NPC) 75.96%; Bello Dangaladima (NEPU) 5.2%; Durumbun Wurno Mahe (Independent) 2.72%
Sabon Birni	Muhammadu Janjuna	NPC	✓ Muhammadu Janjuna (NPC) 74.62%; Tahidan Gobir Usman Kurawa (AG) 10.74%
Sokoto Central	Muhammadu Bida	NPC	✓ Muhammadu Bida (NPC) 72.39%; Abubakar Tambawal (NEPU) 6.11%; H. W. Dan Waziri (AG) 1.49%
Sokoto North Central	Muhammadu Sarkin Gona	NPC	✓ Muhammadu Sarkin Gona (NPC) 92.32%; Isa Dan Saradi (AG) 1.79%; Abbas Mai Takalmi K. Atiku (NEPU) 1.39%
Sokoto South Central	Ahmadu Gorzau	NPC	✓ Ahmadu Gorzau (NPC) 73.01%; Dango Sawaba Bakura (NEPU) 6.43%; Mazuga Dan Ibiran (AG) 2.06%
Sokoto West Central	Abubakar Magatakarda Sokoto	NPC	✓ Abubakar Magatakarda Sokoto (NPC) 80.63%; Chuso Silame (NEPU) 5.3%; A. Dan Babandudu (AG) 1.34%
Sokoto South East	Muhammadu Nadange Sokoto	NPC	✓ Muhammadu Nadange Sokoto} (NPC) 51.83%; Shehu Yaro (NEPU) 26.19%; H. Dan Amadu Kagar K. (AG) 8.64%
Sokoto South	Abubakar Tsofo Mafara	NPC	✓ Abubakar Tsofo Mafara (NPC) 64.47%; Danyaro Gusau (NEPU) 21.33%; Na'allan Dan San Bamo (AG) 5.61%
Sokoto South West	Garba Jabo Abubakar	NPC	✓ Garba Jabo Abubakar (NPC) 70.69%; Abubakar Alabari (NEPU) 7.66%; Mamman Chafe (AG) 3.19%
Sokoto West	Shehu Shagari	NPC	✓ Shehu Shagari (NPC) 77%; Naitebur Shagari (NEPU) 9.49%; Boyi Dan M. Bashire (AG) 4.06%

==== Zaria Province ====
===== Jema'a Division =====
Constituency	Incumbent		Results
Constituency	Incumbent	Party	Candidates
Jema'a	Auta Anzah	AG	✓ Auta Anzah (AG) 30.8%; Tanko Jema'a (NPC) 17.78%; Aboyi Kazah Kafanchan (Independent) 12.91%

===== Zaria Division =====
Constituency	Incumbent		Results
Constituency	Incumbent	Party	Candidates
Ikara-Makarfi	Muhammadu Alangade	NEPU	✓ Muhammadu Alangade (NEPU) 46.51%; Suleh Muhammadu Gazara (NPC) 42.47%; Mauda dan Alhasan (AG) 2.87%
Kaura-Lere	Haikali Dan Maigari	AG	✓ Haikali Dan Maigari (AG) 39.01%; Salisu Rabi'u (NEPU) 22.68%; Tanimu (NPC) 18.25%
Kubau-Soba	Yusha'u A. D. Mohammed	NEPU	✓ Yusha'u A. D. Mohammed (NEPU) 44.79%; Mohammadu Sani Maigamo (NPC) 44.36%; Ali Yahaya (AG) 3.56%
Zangon Katab	Shekarau Ka'a Layya	AG	✓ Shekarau Ka'a Layya (AG) 39.11%; Bala Gora (NPC) 27.13%; Aruwa (Independent) 14.1%
Zaria Central	Saidu Zango	NPC	✓ Saidu Zango (NPC) 45.1%; Aliyu Mahmud (NEPU) 38.42%; Muhammadu Alfaki (AG) 4.83%
Zaria South West	P. Ipu	AG	✓ P. Ipu (AG) 35.68%; Lawal Aliyu (NPC) 26.34%; Adunga (Independent) 10.39%
Zaria North West	Ahmadu Fatika	NPC	✓ Ahmadu Fatika (NPC) 48.37%; Gambo Sawaba (NEPU) 38.94%; Bello Mohammed (AG) 8.31%

=== Western Region ===
==== Aboh Division ====
Constituency	Incumbent		Results
Constituency	Incumbent	Party	Candidates
Aboh	A. Opia	NCNC	✓ A. Opia (NCNC) 50.71%; J. A. Enuenwosu (AG) 0.02%

==== Afenmai (Kukuruku) Division ====
Constituency	Incumbent		Results
Constituency	Incumbent	Party	Candidates
Afenmai East	M. C. K. Obi	AG	✓ M. C. K. Obi (AG) 37.58%; J. M. Udochi (NCNC) 27.31%; M. Deke (Independent) 14.74%
Afenmai West	U. O. Ayeni	NCNC	✓ U. O. Ayeni (NCNC) 0.04%; O. Oarhe (AG) 35.1%; A. Orisaremi (Independent) 5.74%

==== Asaba Division ====
Constituency	Incumbent		Results
Constituency	Incumbent	Party	Candidates
Asaba East	E. A. Mordi	NCNC	✓ E. A. Mordi (NCNC) 53.25%; N. Eze (AG) 23.61%; S. D. C. Jibunoh (Independent) 2.61%
Asaba West	J. B. Eboigbodi	NCNC	✓ J. B. Eboigbodi (NCNC) 39.8%; E. Anuku (Independent) 24.1%; A. O. Dibie (AG) 20.15%

==== Badagry Division ====
Constituency	Incumbent		Results
Constituency	Incumbent	Party	Candidates
Badagry	D. Senu-Oke	NCNC	✓ D. Senu-Oke (NCNC) 46.04%; F. N. H. Ayeni (AG) 33.3%

==== Benin Division ====
Constituency	Incumbent		Results
Constituency	Incumbent	Party	Candidates
Benin Central	H. O. Osagie	NCNC	✓ H. O. Osagie (NCNC) 55.48%; A. Owagboe (AG) 24.55%
Benin East	D. N. Oronsaye	NCNC	✓ D. N. Oronsaye (NCNC) 52.24%; J. E. Igbinedion (AG) 32.68%
Benin West	D. E. Y. Aghahowa	NCNC	✓ D. E. Y. Aghahowa (NCNC) 47.87%; G. Eweka (AG) 32.26%; S. A. Agbedeyi (NDC) 1.59%

==== Egba Division ====
Constituency	Incumbent		Results
Constituency	Incumbent	Party	Candidates
Abeokuta	A. Adedamola	AG	✓ A. Adedamola (AG) 28.42%; J. A. O. Akande (NCNC) 26.55%; F. Ransome-Kuti (Independent) 12.7%
Egba North	E. B. Sorunke	NCNC	✓ E. B. Sorunke (NCNC) 28.62%; J. D. Odebunmi (NEPU) 28.28%; R. Alalafia (Independent) 5.74%
Egba East	Ayo Rosiji	AG	✓ Ayo Rosiji (AG) 40.46%; A. Fashanu (NCNC) 26.72%; E. O. Agunbiade (Independent) 4.47%
Egba South	O. B. Akin-Olugbade	AG	✓ O. B. Akin-Olugbade (AG) 39.07%; R. A. B. Opaleye (NCNC) 21.45%; O. Moore (Independent) 3.61%

==== Egbado Division ====
Constituency	Incumbent		Results
Constituency	Incumbent	Party	Candidates
Egbado North	A. A. Ajibola	AG	✓ A. A. Ajibola (AG) 39.26%; D. A. Fafunmi (NCNC) 30.87%
Egbado South	D. K. Aihonsu	AG	✓ D. K. Aihonsu (AG) 39.6%; S. Taiwo (NCNC) 27.85%

==== Ekiti Division ====
Constituency	Incumbent		Results
Constituency	Incumbent	Party	Candidates
Ekiti North East	A. Akomolafe	AG	✓ A. Akomolafe (AG) 39.22%; A. A. Abiodun (NCNC) 22.17%
Ekiti South East	B. A. Ajayi	AG	✓ B. A. Ajayi (AG) 48.82%; J. O. Arifayan (NCNC) 18.66%
Ekiti North West	G. K. Dada	AG	✓ G. K. Dada (AG) 41.98%; S. O. Lasebikan (NCNC) 11.05%

==== Epe Division ====
Constituency	Incumbent		Results
Constituency	Incumbent	Party	Candidates
Epe	L. O. Tobun	AG	✓ L. O. Tobun (AG) 43.47%; M. D. Kasim (NCNC) 17.54%; N. Egberongbe (NEL (Ijebu-Ode)) 2.68%

==== Ibadan Division ====
Constituency	Incumbent		Results
Constituency	Incumbent	Party	Candidates
Ibadan Central	R. A. Afolabi	Independent	✓ R. A. Afolabi (Independent) 33.33%; R. Okunola (NCNC) 18.42%; R. O. Omonigbehin (AG) 15.85%
Ibadan North East	Augustus Akinloye	AG	✓ Augustus Akinloye (AG) 33.8%; I. A. Akinade (Independent) 32.89%; M. Ajibola (NCNC) 7.34%
Ibadan East	S. Lana	Independent	✓ S. Lana (Independent) 37.67%; D. Ogundiran (AG) 27.38%; A. Adeyinka (NCNC) 8.97%
Ibadan South East	R. O. A. Akinjide	Independent	✓ R. O. A. Akinjide (Independent) 39.49%; L. L. Obisesan (AG) 21.37%; L. Ayantola (NCNC) 13.65%
Ibadan South	S. A. Abasi	Independent	✓ S. A. Abasi (Independent) 35.25%; S. Owoade (AG) 26.7%; S. L. A. Elliott (NCNC) 8.29%
Ibadan South West	S. A. Oyewole	Independent	✓ S. A. Oyewole (Independent) 31.68%; W. Esan (AG) 24.28%; M. Akanbi (NCNC) 21.11%
Ibadan North West	K. O. S. Are	Independent	✓ K. O. S. Are (Independent) 27.27%; A. M. Agbaje (NCNC) 25.76%; A. Ajibola (AG) 22.92%
Ibarapa	D. M. Gbolagunte	Independent	✓ D. M. Gbolagunte (Independent) 21.62%; J. G. Adeniran (AG) 20.82%; J. A. Akinleye (NCNC) 20.78%

==== Ife Division ====
Constituency	Incumbent		Results
Constituency	Incumbent	Party	Candidates
Ife Town	M. A. Omisade	Independent	✓ M. A. Omisade (Independent) 33.26%; R. A. Fani-Kayode (AG) 26.87%; M. Adeojo (NCNC) 1.98%
Ife-Ila	T. O. Oloyede	Independent	✓ T. O. Oloyede (Independent) 28.49%; L. Adebowale (NCNC) 18.26%

==== Ijebu Division ====
Constituency	Incumbent		Results
Constituency	Incumbent	Party	Candidates
Ijebu Central	E. O. Okunowo	AG	✓ E. O. Okunowo (AG) 41.57%; J. O. Osibogun (NCNC) 15.24%; S. O. O. Abudu (NEL(Ijebu-Ode)) 9.43%
Ijebu North	E. D. Akinbowale	AG	✓ E. D. Akinbowale (AG) 43.54%; S. A. Okuneye (NCNC) 9.48%; M. B. Sulaiman (NEL(Ijebu-Ode)) 5.25%
Ijebu South	A. F. Odulana	AG	✓ A. F. Odulana (AG) 41.67%; Y. O. Salami (NEL(Ijebu-Ode)) 12.02%; H. A. T. Odukoya (NCNC) 9.36%

==== Ijebu Remo Division ====
Constituency	Incumbent		Results
Constituency	Incumbent	Party	Candidates
Ijebu Remo	Obafemi Awolowo	AG	✓ Obafemi Awolowo (AG) 60.85%; O. Oyekoya (NCNC) 20.04%

==== Ikeja Division ====
Constituency	Incumbent		Results
Constituency	Incumbent	Party	Candidates
Ikeja	A. O. Ogunsanya	NCNC	✓ A. O. Ogunsanya (NCNC) 41.97%; S. O. Gbadamosi (AG) 33.24%

==== Ilesha Division ====
Constituency	Incumbent		Results
Constituency	Incumbent	Party	Candidates
Ilesha Rural	J. A. Akinyemi	AG	✓ J. A. Akinyemi (AG) 43.63%; C. O. Komolafe (NCNC) 40.87%
Ilesha Urban	J. O. Ogunbiyi	NCNC	✓ J. O. Ogunbiyi (NCNC) 52.65%; I. O. Ajanaku (AG) 32.3%

==== Ishan Division ====
Constituency	Incumbent		Results
Constituency	Incumbent	Party	Candidates
Ishan East	Anthony Enahoro	AG	✓ Anthony Enahoro (AG) 52.61%; A. Imoisili (NCNC) 25.97%; P. A. Oboh (Independent) 9.24%
Ishan West	P. D. Oboh	AG	✓ P. D. Oboh (AG) 47.69%; A. O. Airewele (NCNC) 39.36%; A. A. Osunbor (Independent) 4.51%

==== Okitipupa Division ====
Constituency	Incumbent		Results
Constituency	Incumbent	Party	Candidates
Okitipupa North	O. Akinfosile	NCNC	✓ O. Akinfosile (NCNC) 30.57%; J. A. Ijose (AG) 28.13%
Okitipupa South	S. A. Oladiran	AG	✓ S. A. Oladiran (AG) 27.09%; H. Jatuwase (NCNC) 21.93%; S. E. Oriamaja (NDC) 4.23%

==== Ondo Division ====
Constituency	Incumbent		Results
Constituency	Incumbent	Party	Candidates
Ondo North East	W. J. Falaiye	AG	✓ W. J. Falaiye (AG) 30.69%; S. O. Ojo (NCNC) 29.91%
Ondo West	S. A. Oladapo	AG	✓ S. A. Oladapo (AG) 39.53%; B. A. Ademodi (NCNC) 19.12%

==== Oshun Division ====
Constituency	Incumbent		Results
Constituency	Incumbent	Party	Candidates
Ede-Ejigbo	D. A. Ogunleye	AG	✓ D. A. Ogunleye (AG) 26.53%; S. A. Layonu (AG) 21.87%
Iwo East	T. A. Lamuye	NCNC	✓ T. A. Lamuye (NCNC) 29.76%; N. O. Alao (AG) 28.39%; M. A. Adedigba (NPC) 12.14%
Iwo West	S. Fajinmi	AG	✓ S. Fajinmi (AG) 49.15%; S. A. Nafiu (NCNC) 31.53%; O. Asafa (NEL(Ijebu-Ode)) 4.01%
Ogbomosho North	V. L. Lajide	AG	✓ V. L. Lajide (AG) 40.85%; S. A. Anifaloba (NCNC) 13.73%; M. K. Buari (NEL(Ijebu-Ode)) 5.64%
Ogbomosho South	S. O. Ogundipe	AG	✓ S. O. Ogundipe (AG) 46.71%; S. Lawal (NCNC) 8.56%; K. R. Ayinla (NEL(Ijebu-Ode)) 3.79%
Oshogbo North	A. A. Odurinde	NCNC	✓ A. A. Odurinde (NCNC) 34.35%; J. O. Adeyemo (AG) 30.41%
Oshogbo South	B. A. Adeyemo	NCNC	✓ B. A. Adeyemo (NCNC) 46.89%; A. Obidiran (AG) 34.31%
Oshun North East	J. O. Olaore	AG	✓ J. O. Olaore (AG) 41.62%; A. Dahunsi (NCNC) 27.63%; O. Bamidele (OUP) 3.84%
Oshun South East	E. J. Ogunkanmi	AG	✓ E. J. Ogunkanmi (AG) 28.49%; J. A. Oyebanji (NCNC) 18.26%; C. F. I. Olaniyan (Independent) 18.26%

==== Owo Division ====
Constituency	Incumbent		Results
Constituency	Incumbent	Party	Candidates
Owo North	S. A. Ogedengbe	AG	✓ S. A. Ogedengbe (AG) 50.13%; S. S. Aguda (NCNC) 22.03%
Owo South	M. A. Ajasin	AG	✓ M. A. Ajasin (AG) 37%; R. A. Akinyemi (NCNC) 28.28%

==== Oyo Division ====
Constituency	Incumbent		Results
Constituency	Incumbent	Party	Candidates
Oyo Central	S. A. Yerokun	NCNC	✓ S. A. Yerokun (NCNC) 47.8%; M. Adeleke (AG) 41.15%
Oyo East	A. Akerele	AG	✓ A. Akerele (AG) 49.43%; E. O. Ashamu (NCNC) 46.43%
Oyo South	S. O. Kolade	AG	✓ S. O. Kolade (AG) 61.88%; G. O. Adeola (NCNC) 14.53%
Oyo North West	J. O. Taiwo	AG	✓ J. O. Taiwo (AG) 45.43%; A. A. Akintunde (NCNC) 25.27%; E. A. Adegunwa (Independent) 8.76%

==== Urhobo Division ====
Constituency	Incumbent		Results
Constituency	Incumbent	Party	Candidates
Urhobo Central	J. S. Mariere	NCNC	✓ J. S. Mariere (NCNC) 49.43%; J. E. Edjeren (AG) 28.01%
Urhobo East	J. K. De-Omomadia	NCNC	✓ J. K. De-Omomadia (NCNC) 37.21%; J. E. Etoroma (AG) 36.45%; E. E. Edukore (Independent) 2.38%
Urhobo West	O. Oweh	NCNC	✓ O. Oweh (NCNC) 45.91%; J. E. Odiete (AG) 22.73%

==== Warri Division ====
Constituency	Incumbent		Results
Constituency	Incumbent	Party	Candidates
Warri	Festus Okotie-Eboh	NCNC	✓ Festus Okotie-Eboh (NCNC) 47.33%; O. N. Rewane (AG) 30.47%; J. M. Ereku (NDC) 0.86%

==== Western Ijaw Division ====
Constituency	Incumbent		Results
Constituency	Incumbent	Party	Candidates
Western Ijaw	N. A. Ezonbodor	NCNC	✓ N. A. Ezonbodor (NCNC) 22.06%; F. M. Bribena (AG) 19.02%; E. K. Iseru (NDC) 18.9%

=== Eastern Region ===
==== Aba Division ====
Constituency	Incumbent		Results
Constituency	Incumbent	Party	Candidates
Aba Urban	F. I. Okoronkwo	NCNC	✓ F. I. Okoronkwo (NCNC) 74.54%; C. N. Obioha (DPNC) 9.4%
Aba Central	M. Ubani	NCNC	✓ M. Ubani (NCNC) 56.39%; S. U. Ukoma (AG) 20.94%
Aba North	Jaja Wachuku	NCNC	✓ Jaja Wachuku (NCNC) 67.89%; B. Oyoyo (AG) 9.91%
Aba South	O. C. Ememe	NCNC	✓ O. C. Ememe (NCNC) 53.84%; A. W. Emutchay (Independent) 14.58%; S. M. Ebuh (AG) 6.24%

==== Abak Division ====
Constituency	Incumbent		Results
Constituency	Incumbent	Party	Candidates
Abak South East	P. U. Umoh	AG	✓ P. U. Umoh (AG) 61.23%; E. A. Essien (NCNC) 25.73%
Abak North West	R. A. Orok	AG	✓ R. A. Orok (AG) 47.85%; J. U. Udom (NCNC) 30.94%

==== Abakiliki Division ====
Constituency	Incumbent		Results
Constituency	Incumbent	Party	Candidates
Ezza	J. O. Igwe	NCNC	✓ J. O. Igwe (NCNC) 30.57%; A. A. Njoku (DPNC) 4.65%
Ikwo	O. O. Nweke	NCNC	✓ O. O. Nweke (NCNC) 49.87%; J. N. Igwe (Independent) 5.39%
Ishielu	N. Nwangbo	NCNC	✓ N. Nwangbo (NCNC) 43.39%; P. E. Uwa (Independent) 0.01%
Izi North	J. N. Nwofokoda	NCNC	✓ J. N. Nwofokoda (NCNC) 39.36%; J. N. Nwankwo (Independent) 15.77%; D. N. Igwe (Independent) 5.03%
Izi South	B. O. Ikeh	NCNC	✓ B. O. Ikeh (NCNC) 52.29%; J. Nwiboko (AG) 4.57%

==== Afikpo Division ====
Constituency	Incumbent		Results
Constituency	Incumbent	Party	Candidates
Afikpo North	A. Nwachuku	NCNC	✓ A. Nwachuku (NCNC) 40.81%; O. Eze (AG) 9.41%
Afikpo South	N. Enwo	NCNC	✓ N. Enwo (NCNC) 46.21%; O. Onuchima (Independent) 5.78%; O. Edumankama (DPNC) 4.75%

==== Ahoada Division ====
Constituency	Incumbent		Results
Constituency	Incumbent	Party	Candidates
Ahoada Central	I. Onwuchekwa	NCNC	✓ I. Onwuchekwa (NCNC) 73.95%; E. A. D. Alikor (AG) 5.52%
Ahoada North East	J. A. Akor	NCNC	✓ J. A. Akor (NCNC) 80.38%; D. A. Ikenga (AG) 3.33%
Ahoada West	N. E. Elenwa	NCNC	✓ N. E. Elenwa (NCNC) 44.15%; S. A. Elemele (Independent) 12.97%; D. I. Umodu (Independent) 8.29%

==== Awgu Division ====
Constituency	Incumbent		Results
Constituency	Incumbent	Party	Candidates
Awgu North	D. N. Chukwu	NCNC	✓ D. N. Chukwu (NCNC) 59.41%; F. C. Edjeagbasi (Independent) 13.77%; B. Ikeson (DPNC) 3.44%
Awgu South	J. Chukwu	NCNC	✓ J. Chukwu (NCNC) 47.75%; J. Uma (Independent) 19.61%; B. Udenta (DPNC) 3%

==== Awka Division ====
Constituency	Incumbent		Results
Constituency	Incumbent	Party	Candidates
Awka Central	R. N. Muojeke	NCNC	✓ R. N. Muojeke (NCNC) 41.21%; O. Adi (Independent) 35.72%; T. O. C. Ojiako (Independent) 6.77%
Awka North	F. C. Ogbalu	NCNC	✓ F. C. Ogbalu (NCNC) 57.61%; F. O. Mgbako (DPNC) 2.7%
Awka South	F. Mbakogu	NCNC	✓ F. Mbakogu (NCNC) 58.03%; P. I. Onyemobi (Independent) 14.84%; M. C. Mayie (DPNC) 1.96%

==== Bende Division ====
Constituency	Incumbent		Results
Constituency	Incumbent	Party	Candidates
Bende Central	H. O. Chuku	NCNC	✓ H. O. Chuku (NCNC) 73.71%; O. M. Isika (DPNC) 3.06%
Bende East	K. Ezera	NCNC	✓ K. Ezera (NCNC) 55.1%; U. I. Ikoha (Independent) 4.63%; U. Obaji (AG) 4%
Bende West	C. A. Odigbo	NCNC	✓ C. A. Odigbo (NCNC) 71.64%; G. C. S. Umuekwe (DPNC) 3.8%

==== Brass Division ====
Constituency	Incumbent		Results
Constituency	Incumbent	Party	Candidates
Brass	Melford Okilo	NDC	✓ Melford Okilo (NDC) 21.57%; L. Mabington (Independent) 14.64%; E. Bens (NCNC) 12.45%

==== Calabar Division ====
Constituency	Incumbent		Results
Constituency	Incumbent	Party	Candidates
Calabar	A. E. Efiong-Spatts	AG	✓ A. E. Efiong-Spatts (AG) 54.54%; E. E. E. Ephraim (NCNC) 23.38%

==== Degema Division ====
Constituency	Incumbent		Results
Constituency	Incumbent	Party	Candidates
Degema	W. Briggs	AG	✓ W. Briggs (AG) 27.29%; J. O. Ngiangia (NCNC) 26.6%; N. Rowlands (NDC) 7.88%

==== Eket Division ====
Constituency	Incumbent		Results
Constituency	Incumbent	Party	Candidates
Eket East	O. J. Emirue	AG	✓ O. J. Emirue (AG) 48.65%; E. A. Esin (NCNC) 26.99%
Eket West	T. I. Etukudo	AG	✓ T. I. Etukudo (AG) 44.47%; J. L. Nsima (NCNC) 14.13%; D. J. Edoho (Independent) 9.81%

==== Enyong Division ====
Constituency	Incumbent		Results
Constituency	Incumbent	Party	Candidates
Enyong North	J. U. Udenyi	NCNC	✓ J. U. Udenyi (NCNC) 58.35%; I. Ahi (AG) 25.12%; T. K. Utchay (Independent) 1.87%
Enyong South	P. E. Ekanem	AG	✓ P. E. Ekanem (AG) 72.73%; E. A. Udo (NCNC) 9.38%; A. U. Ekanem (Independent) 1.27%

==== Ikom Division ====
Constituency	Incumbent		Results
Constituency	Incumbent	Party	Candidates
Ikom	P. Ejukwa	NCNC	✓ P. Ejukwa (NCNC) 42.26%; F. Akonjom (AG) 34.85%

==== Ikot Ekpene Division ====
Constituency	Incumbent		Results
Constituency	Incumbent	Party	Candidates
Ikot Ekpene Central	B. Ukpono	AG	✓ B. Ukpono (AG) 53.96%; H. A. Udo (NCNC) 33.65%
Ikot Ekpene North East	S. U. Idiong	AG	✓ S. U. Idiong (AG) 59.49%; O. W. Inyang (NCNC) 16.51%; B. O. Nya (Independent) 1.8%
Ikot Ekpene South	M. B. Afanideh	AG	✓ M. B. Afanideh (AG) 46.61%; A. E. Bassey (NCNC) 44.37%

==== Nsukka Division ====
Constituency	Incumbent		Results
Constituency	Incumbent	Party	Candidates
Nsukka Central	F. A. M. Abadi	NCNC	✓ F. A. M. Amadi (NCNC) 55.83%; S. U. Alumona (Independent) 18.62%; S. Eze (AG) 2.51%
Nsukka North	D. C. Ugwu	NCNC	✓ D. C. Ugwu (NCNC) 61.51%; G. Guzua (AG) 2.56%
Nsukka East	N. N. Onugu	NCNC	✓ N. N. Onugu (NCNC) 41.68%; S. N. Nwaroh (Independent) 27.01%; J. A. Nwamba (AG) 1.66%
Nsukka West	V. A. Nwalieji	NCNC	✓ V. A. Nwalieji (NCNC) 50.08%; P. N. Udemezue (DPNC) 11.35%

==== Obubra Division ====
Constituency	Incumbent		Results
Constituency	Incumbent	Party	Candidates
Obubra	U. U. Eko	NCNC	✓ U. U. Eko (NCNC) 41.88%; O. Arikpo (AG) 34.02%

==== Ogojo Division ====
Constituency	Incumbent		Results
Constituency	Incumbent	Party	Candidates
Ogojo East	J. U. Odey	NCNC	✓ J. U. Odey (NCNC) 38.68%; J. O. Ekunke (AG) 18.54%
Ogojo West	M. T. Mbu	NCNC	✓ M. T. Mbu (NCNC) 46.25%; M. A. Odibu (AG) 33.16%; J. B. Ekpong (Independent) 3.79%

==== Ogoni Division ====
Constituency	Incumbent		Results
Constituency	Incumbent	Party	Candidates
Ogoni East	S. F. Nwika	NCNC	✓ S. F. Nwika (NCNC) 45.27%; F. M. A. Saronwiyo (NDC) 21.6%; N. G. H. J. Alapbe (AG) 11.82%
Ogoni West	K. Giadom	NCNC	✓ K. Giadom (NCNC) 44.78%; V. G. Monsi (AG) 8.58%; J. B. Poromou (NDC) 6.66%

==== Okigwi Division ====
Constituency	Incumbent		Results
Constituency	Incumbent	Party	Candidates
Okigwi Central	F. E. Offor	NCNC	✓ F. E. Offor (NCNC) 64.22%; L. N. Obioha (DPNC) 22.76%; U. Ibeagi (Independent) 1.35%
Okigwi North East	F. U. Ihe	NCNC	✓ F. U. Ihe (NCNC) 48.37%; W. Ume (Independent) 32.05%; M. O. Udeagu (DPNC) 6.29%
Okigwi South East	P. O. Eleke	NCNC	✓ P. O. Eleke (NCNC) 73.04%; G. Anukwuem (Independent) 5.69%; A. Ihemeson (AG) 3.2%
Okigwi South West	D. O. Ahamefula	NCNC	✓ D. O. Ahamefula (NCNC) 65.25%; S. D. Ajero (Independent) 13.75%; B. C. Agu (AG) 4.2%

==== Onitsha Division ====
Constituency	Incumbent		Results
Constituency	Incumbent	Party	Candidates
Onitsha Urban	Nnamdi Azikiwe	NCNC	✓ Nnamdi Azikiwe (NCNC) 63.77%; J. E. Iweka (DPNC) 11.47%
Onitsha North Central	P. U. Okeke	NCNC	✓ P. U. Okeke (NCNC) 69.87%; E. O. Awduche (AG) 7.26%; C. Uzodimma (Independent) 1.59%
Onitsha South Central	M. Amechi	NCNC	✓ M. Amechi (NCNC) 71.87%; A. Z. K. Orizu (DPNC) 4.22%
Onitsha North	L. N. Ezeani	NCNC	✓ L. N. Ezeani (NCNC) 36.63%; M. Ifemenam (Independent) 12.31%; P. Ogugua (DPNC) 1.2%
Onitsha South	V. C. Iketuonye	NCNC	✓ V. C. Iketuonye (NCNC) 62.85%; G. E. Akajiofor (DPNC) 2.45%; M. Nwosu (Independent) 2.03%

==== Opobo Division ====
Constituency	Incumbent		Results
Constituency	Incumbent	Party	Candidates
Opobo North	D. S. Udo-Inyang	AG	✓ D. S. Udo-Inyang (AG) 83.14%; E. E. Akpbio (NCNC) 5.16%
Opobo South	U. O. Ekenokot	NCNC	✓ U. O. Ekenokot (NCNC) 53.16%; E. U. Udoma (AG) 36.28%

==== Orlu Division ====
Constituency	Incumbent		Results
Constituency	Incumbent	Party	Candidates
Orlu North	E. O. Ifezue	NCNC	✓ E. O. Ifezue (NCNC) 69.41%; T. E. Egomole (DPNC) 17.23%
Orlu North East	V. E. Eze	NCNC	✓ V. E. Eze (NCNC) 56.48%; K. O. Mbadiwe (DPNC) 34.18%
Orlu South East	E. C. Akwiwu	NCNC	✓ E. C. Akwiwu (NCNC) 62.75%; M. R. Nwogu (Independent) 11.78%; F. E. Nnabuife (DPNC) 7.62%
Orlu West	B. U. Nzeribe	NCNC	✓ B. U. Nzeribe (NCNC) 75.59%; T. I. Uba (DPNC) 8.16%

==== Owerri Division ====
Constituency	Incumbent		Results
Constituency	Incumbent	Party	Candidates
Owerri Central	Raymond Njoku	NCNC	✓ Raymond Njoku (NCNC) 64.79%; E. Ogueri (Independent) 11.3%; C. Anozie (Independent) 6.8%
Owerri North	A. U. D. Mbah	NCNC	✓ A. U. D. Mbah (NCNC) 61.19%; O. U. Eronini (Independent) 20.13%; S. Egbuchulem (AG) 3.6%
Owerri North East	N. D. Ukah	NCNC	✓ N. D. Ukah (NCNC) 83.47%; H. Ajuziogu (DPNC) 3.46%
Owerri East	D. N. Abii	NCNC	✓ D. N. Abii (NCNC) 65.89%; D. Amanze (DPNC) 18.02%; A. Onuoha (AG) 2.61%
Owerri South East	B. U. Ukaegbu	NCNC	✓ B. U. Ukaegbu (NCNC) 78.7%; S. Opara (AG) 4.15%; J. Nworgu (Independent) 2.09%
Owerri West	R. B. K. Okafor	NCNC	✓ R.B.K. Okafor (NCNC); Returned Unopposed

==== Port Harcourt Division ====
Constituency	Incumbent		Results
Constituency	Incumbent	Party	Candidates
Port Harcourt	D. D. U. Okay	NCNC	✓ D. D. U. Okay (NCNC) 74.27%; R. T. Brown (AG) 7.07%

==== Udi Division ====
Constituency	Incumbent		Results
Constituency	Incumbent	Party	Candidates
Abaji and Ngwo	G. O. D. Eneh	NCNC	✓ G. O. D. Eneh (NCNC) 41.27%; P. U. Nnamani (Independent) 33.79%
Enugu	C. Chiedozie	NCNC	✓ C. Chiedozie (NCNC) 67.57%; J. Onwuzulike (DPNC) 5.79%
Udi Central	I. O. Chikelu	NCNC	✓ I. O. Chikelu (NCNC) 37.67%; J. M. Okafor (Independent) 10.39%; S. E. Okozor (Independent) 1.47%
Udi East	S. Nnaji	NCNC	✓ S. Nnaji (NCNC) 63.27%; A. C. Orji (DPNC) 3.78%

==== Uyo Division ====
Constituency	Incumbent		Results
Constituency	Incumbent	Party	Candidates
Uyo North	S. J. Umoren	AG	✓ S. J. Umoren (AG) 64.34%; E. Nyong (NCNC) 12.72%
Uyo South East	P. O. Akpan	AG	✓ P. O. Akpan (AG) 53.59%; K. I. Etuk (NCNC) 25.62%
Uyo South West	I. A. Brown	AG	✓ I. A. Brown (AG) 55.96%; G. T. Etudor (NCNC) 17.66%; E. T. Ekwere (Independent) 3.05%

=== Federal Territory ===
Constituency	Incumbent		Results
Constituency	Incumbent	Party	Candidates
Lagos Central	L. J. Dosunmu	AG	✓ L. J. Dosunmu (AG) 40.67%; O. A. F. Beyioku (NCNC) 37.53%; Y. Salawu (NPC) 0.38%
Lagos North	T. O. S. Benson	NCNC	✓ T. O. S. Benson (NCNC) 47.59%; S. A. Onitiri (AG) 29.86%
Lagos South	J. M. Johnson	NCNC	✓ J. M. Johnson (NCNC) 43.07%; J. O. Akerele (AG) 29.24%

== See also ==
- Ronald Wraith, British national, chairman of the Nigerian Federal Electoral Commission for the 1959 parliamentary and regional elections
