= Cabinet of Abubakar Tafawa Balewa =

Government of Nigeria, 1957–1966

- Cabinet of Nigeria
- Date established: 30 August 1957
- Date dissolved: 15 January 1966

Leadership and composition
- Head of state: Elizabeth II (until 1963); Nnamdi Azikiwe (from 1963)
- Head of government: Abubakar Tafawa Balewa
- Member party: Northern People's Congress (NPC); National Council of Nigeria and the Cameroons (NCNC)

Formation and history
- Successor: Government of Major-General Johnson Aguiyi-Ironsi

The Cabinet of Abubakar Tafawa Balewa was the government of Nigeria, headed by Prime Minister Abubakar Tafawa Balewa, in the years leading up to and following independence. There were three cabinets. The first was established in 1957 when Balewa was appointed prime minister by the British governor-general. The second was formed after the general elections of December 1959, just before independence, in a coalition government. The third was formed after the disputed general elections of December 1964, and was dissolved after the military coup of 15 January 1966.

== First cabinet: 1957–59 ==
On 30 August 1957 the governor-general of Nigeria, Sir James Wilson Robertson, announced that Abubakar Tafawa Balewa had been appointed prime minister, with a broad-based National Government. His first cabinet included ministers from all parties. The cabinet was based on that appointed after the 1954 elections. Cabinet ministers included:

Office	Name	Notes
Prime Minister	Tafawa Balewa	
Transportation	Raymond Njoku	
Education	Igwe Aja-Nwachukwu	Replaced Matthew Mbu
Commerce	K. O. Mbadiwe	
Communications	Samuel Akintola	New appointee
Finance	Festus Okotie-Eboh	
Internal Affairs	J. M. Johnson	replaced Adegoke Adelabu
Information	Kola Balogun	
Health	Ayo Rosiji	New appointee
Mines	Muhammadu Ribadu	
Works	Zanna Bukar Dipcharima	Replaced Inuwa Wada

== Second cabinet: 1959–64 ==
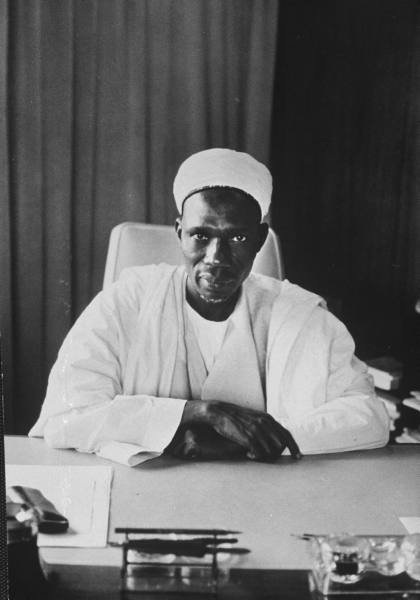
Abubakar Tafawa Balewa' in 1962

The next elections were held on 12 December 1959. Results were Northern People's Congress (NPC): 134 seats; National Council of Nigeria and the Cameroons (NCNC) / Northern Elements Progressive Union (NEPU): 89 seats; Action Group (AG): 73 seats; Other: 16 seats. The NPC and NCNC formed an alliance to create the new government, with Belewa again prime minister. Nnamdi Azikiwe became ceremonial president. Northerners were given the most important ministerial posts. Balewa at first retained control of foreign policy, which was pro-western, and did not consult the cabinet. The Balewa coalition of the NPC and NCNC held until 1964, when it broke up due to a dispute over leadership and ministerial appointments. On 8 December 1964 parliament was officially dissolved. Ministers in the second Balewa cabinet were:

Office	Name	Notes
Prime Minister	Tafawa Balewa	
Foreign Affairs	Jaja Wachuku	From 1961
Attorney Gen/Justice	Taslim Olawale Elias	
Defence	Muhammadu Ribadu	
Lands & Lagos Affairs	Musa Yar'Adua	
Finance	Festus Okotie-Eboh	
Transport and Aviation	Raymond Njoku	
Commerce &industries	Zanna Bukar Dipcharima	
Works & Surveys	Inuwa Wada	
Labour & Welfare	J. M. Johnson	Also responsible for Sports.
Education	Igwe Aja-Nwachukwu	
Mines & Power	Maitama Sule	
Economic Development & Natural Resources	Shehu Shagari	
Communications	Olu Akinfosile	
Internal Affairs	Usman Sarki	
Information	T. O. S. Benson	
Health	Waziri Ibrahim	
Pensions, Establishment & Nigerianization	Yisa Yara'Dua	

== Third cabinet: 1964–66 ==
Before the general elections of December 1964 the United Progressive Grand Alliance (UPGA), an alliance of the NCNC, AG, NEPU and United Middle Belt Congress (UMBC), complained that the campaign had not been free or fair. In the north, candidates had been intimidated and prevented from registering. President Azikiwe tried to postpone the elections, but Balewa held them anyway. Despite a partial boycott of the elections by the UPGA, the NNA alliance between the NPC and Nigerian National Democratic Party (NNDP), gained only a slim majority. Azikiwe at first refused to ask Balewa to form a cabinet, but after a power struggle that lasted a few days he agreed on condition that Balewa's government be broad-based, and that fresh elections be held in the regions where the boycott had taken effect. Balewa's government of national unity included members from both the winning and losing parties. There were 54 members in the cabinet from the NPC (22), NNDP (14), NCNC (15) as well as three independents. This included 21 Cabinet Ministers, 11 Ministers of Cabinet Rank without Portfolio and 22 Ministers without Cabinet Rank. Ministers with Portfolios were:

Office	Name	Notes
Prime Minister & External Affairs	Tafawa Balewa	
Defense	Muhammadu Ribadu	Inua Ribadu
Attorney Gen/Justice	Taslim Olawale Elias	
Finance	Festus Okotie-Eboh	
Lands & Lagos Affairs	Musa Yar'Adua	
Transport	Zanna Bukar Dipcharima	
Aviation	Jaja Wachuku	
Trade	K. O. Mbadiwe	
Industries	Augustus Akinloye	
Works	Inua Wada	
Housing & Surveys	Adeniran Ogunsanya	
Labor	Adeleke Adedoyin	
Education	Richard Akinjide	
Mines & Power	Maitama Sule	Dominic Mapeo Minister of State
Economic Development	Waziri Ibrahim	
Natural Resources & Research	Alade Lamuye	
Communications	Raymond Njoku	
Internal Affairs	Shehu Shagari	
Information	Ayo Rosiji	
Health	Moses Majekodunmi	
Establishment	Jacob Obande	

At midnight on 15 January 1966 five young army officers launched a coup. They killed Balewa and other leading politicians. The next day Acting President Orizu handed over power to Major-General Johnson Aguiyi-Ironsi.

== Sources ==
- Abegunrin, Olayiwola (2003). Nigerian Foreign Policy Under Military Rule, 1966–1999. Greenwood Publishing Group. ISBN 978-0-275-97881-5.
- Dowding, Keith (13 August 2014). The Selection of Ministers Around the World. Routledge. ISBN 978-1-317-63445-4.
- Falola, Toyin (2004). Economic Reforms and Modernization in Nigeria, 1945–1965. Kent State University Press. ISBN 978-0-87338-801-6.
- James O. Ojiako (1981). "Nigeria: Yesterday, Today and ?". African Education Publishers (Nig.) Ltd.
- Kayode Oyediran; Adetowo Aderemi (3 May 2015). "Right of Reply – Do Not Falsify Nigeria's Political History: Give Jonathan His Due Credit". Vanguard.
- Ojo, Bamidele A. (1 January 2001). Problems and Prospects of Sustaining Democracy in Nigeria. Nova Publishers. ISBN 978-1-56072-949-5.
- Okafor, Victor Oguejiofor (13 September 2013). A Roadmap for Understanding African Politics: Leadership and Political Integration in Nigeria. Routledge. ISBN 978-1-135-52904-8.
- Okocha, Emma (27 February 2014). "Enter the Alibaba Ministers…". The Sun. Archived from the original on 4 July 2015.
