= 1964 Nigerian general election =

Parliamentary elections were held in Nigeria on 30 December 1964, although they were not held until 18 March 1965 in some constituencies in Eastern Region, Lagos, and Mid-Western Region due to a boycott in December. The election saw most parties run as part of alliances, the Nigerian National Alliance (the Northern People's Congress, the Nigerian National Democratic Party, the Midwest Democratic Front, the Dynamic Party, the Niger Delta Congress, the Lagos State United Front and the Republican Party) and the United Progressive Grand Alliance (the National Council of Nigeria and the Cameroons, Action Group, the Northern Progressive Front, the Kano People's Party, the Northern Elements Progressive Union, the United Middle Belt Congress and the Zamfara Commoners Party).

The result was a victory for the Northern People's Congress, which won 162 of the 312 seats in the House of Representatives, whilst the NNA held a total of 198 seats. Sir Abubakar Tafawa Balewa was re-elected Prime Minister of Nigeria. However, the election was marked by manipulation and violence.

== Results ==
Party	Votes	%	Seats	+/–
Northern People's Congress	2,168,007	37.63	162	+28
National Council of Nigerian Citizens	1,640,700	28.48	84	+3
Nigerian National Democratic Party	870,833	15.11	36	New
Action Group	494,730	8.59	21	−52
Northern Progressive Front	258,913	4.49	4	New
Midwest Democratic Front	93,161	1.62	0	New
Dynamic Party	42,834	0.74	0	New
Republican Party	25,831	0.45	0	New
Socialist Workers and Farmers Party	20,347	0.35	0	New
Niger Delta Congress	17,798	0.31	0	New
Independents	128,329	2.23	5	New
Total	5,761,483	100.00	312	0
Source: African Elections Database, Nohlen et al.
