= First Nigerian Republic =

First republican Governance in Nigeria

Federal Republic of Nigeria
- 1963–1966
- Flag Coat of arms
- Motto: "Peace, Unity, Freedom"
- Anthem: Nigeria, We Hail Thee
- Capital: Lagos
- Common languages: English · Hausa · Igbo · Yoruba and other regional languages
- Religion: Islam · Christianity · Traditional beliefs
- Government: Federal parliamentary republic
- President
  - 1963–1966: Nnamdi Azikiwe
- Prime Minister
  - 1963–1966: Sir Abubakar Tafawa Balewa
- Legislature: Parliament
  - Upper house: Senate
  - Lower house: House of Representatives
- Historical era: Cold War
  - Constitution adopted: 1 October 1963
  - Coup d'état: 15 January 1966

Area
- 1963: 923,768 km^{2} (356,669 sq mi)

Population
  - 1963: 55,670,055
- Currency: Nigerian pound
- Time zone: UTC+1 (WAT)
- ISO 3166 code: NG
Preceded by	Succeeded by
Federation of Nigeria	Nigerian military junta
- Today part of: Nigeria; Cameroon^{a}
- ^a Bakassi peninsula; governed by Nigeria until 2008

The First Republic was the republican government of Nigeria between 1963 and 1966 governed by the first republican constitution. The country's government was based on a federal form of the Westminster system. The period between 1 October 1960, when the country gained its independence, and 15 January 1966, when the first military coup d’état took place, is also generally referred to as the First Republic. The first Republic of Nigeria was ruled by different leaders representing their regions as premiers in a federation during this period.

== History ==
=== Foundation ===
The journey to independence began with some constitutional developments in Nigeria. These constitutional developments saw the country attaining self-rule in some quarters in 1957 and full independence on 1 October 1960.

The Federation of Nigeria gained independence from the United Kingdom on 1 October 1960 as a Commonwealth realm, with the British monarch, Elizabeth II, being retained as head of state with the title Queen of Nigeria. A new constitution declaring the nation a republic within the Commonwealth of Nations was adopted in 1963. The Westminster system of government was retained, and thus the president's powers were generally ceremonial.

=== 1966 coup ===
The political unrest during the mid-1960s culminated into Nigeria's first military coup d'état. On 15 January 1966, Major Chukwuma Kaduna Nzeogwu and his fellow rebel soldiers (most of whom were of southern extraction) and were led by Major Emmanuel Ifeajuna of the Nigerian Army, executed a bloody takeover of all institutions of government. Prime Minister Tafawa Balewa, was assassinated along with the premier of Northern Nigeria, strong-man Ahmadu Bello, the Sardauna of Sokoto; Samuel Akintola, premier of the West; and Festus Okotie-Eboh, the finance minister. It is not clear whether President Azikiwe's life was spared because he was out of the country at the time, or whether he had been informed about the impending coup and was out of the country so that his life could be spared. Major-General Johnson Aguiyi-Ironsi took control as the first Head of the Federal Military Government of Nigeria on January 16, 1966.

=== Civil war and beyond: 1966–1979 ===
The republic would be torn by the secession of Biafra and the ensuing Nigerian Civil War from 1966 to 1970. After the end of the war, the nation re-unified and military rule continued for another nine years, implementing nationalisation of foreign businesses. Eventually, elections were held in 1979 leading the way to the Nigerian Second Republic.

== Government and politics ==
=== Executive ===
Dr. Nnamdi Azikiwe served as the first president from 1 October 1963 – 16 January 1966. Azikiwe had previously resigned from NCNC to become the first governor-general of Nigeria from 16 November 1960 to 30 September 1963. Sir Abubakar Tafawa Balewa of the Northern People's Congress was the only prime minister during the period of the First Republic.

=== Legislature ===
The Federal Parliament was the legislative branch of the government, consisting of three elements: The President, the Senate and the directly elected House of Representatives. The Senate was modelled after the British House of Lords and the Canadian Senate. It had 20 members, twelve of which represented each region and were nominated by an electoral college of their respective regional assemblies. Four were appointed by the President on the advice of the prime minister and the remaining four individuals represented the Federal Territory: the Oba of Lagos (an ex officio Senator), a chief selected by parliament, and two other individuals. Regional parliaments had similar chambers: the House of Assembly and the House of Chiefs.

=== Political parties ===
- Action Group (AG)
- Borno Youth Movement (BYM)
- Democratic Party of Nigeria and Cameroon (DPNC)
- Dynamic Party (DP)
- Igala Union (IU)
- Igbira Tribal Union (ITU)
- Midwest Democratic Front (MDF)
- National Council of Nigeria and the Cameroons/National Convention of Nigerian Citizens (NCNC)
- National Independence Party (NIP)
- Niger Delta Congress (NDC)
- Nigerian National Democratic Party (NNDP)
- Northern Elements Progressive Union (NEPU)
- Northern People's Congress (NPC)
- Northern Progressive Front (NPF)
- Republican Party (RP)
- United Middle Belt Congress (UMBC)
- United National Independence Party (UNIP)
- Zamfara Commoners Party (ZCP)

=== Regionalism ===
The original regional Premiers of the republic were the following:

- Northern Nigeria Ahmadu Bello (1959–1966)
- Western Nigeria Samuel Akintola (1960–1966)
- Eastern Nigeria: Michael Okpara (1960–1966)
- Mid-Western Nigeria: Dennis Osadebay (1964–1966)

The country was split into three geopolitical regions—Western Region, Eastern Region and Northern Region—and its political parties took on the identities and ideologies of each region. The Northern People's Congress (NPC) represented the interests of the predominantly Hausa/Fulani Northern Region, the National Council of Nigeria and the Cameroons (NCNC) (later renamed to "National Council of Nigerian Citizens") represented the predominantly Igbo Eastern Region, and the Action Group (AG) dominated the Yoruba Western Region. The NPC took control of the federal parliament, and formed a coalition government with the NCNC. The National Independence Party (NIP) formed by Professor Eyo Ita became the second political party in the old Eastern Region. Ahmadu Bello, the Sardauna of Sokoto, leader of the NPC, was poised to become the prime minister, but instead he chose to become the premier of the Northern Region, and supported his deputy Tafawa Balewa's candidacy for the prime ministership. This raised suspicions among the southern politicians, who resented the idea of a federal government controlled by a regional leader through his designated proxy. In the end, Tafawa Balewa of NPC was named Prime Minister and Head of Government, and Nnamdi Azikiwe of NCNC was named President.

At Nigeria's independence, the Northern Region gained more seats in parliament than both Eastern and Western regions combined—this would cement Northern dominance in Nigerian politics for years to come. Resentment among southern politicians precipitated into political chaos in the country. Obafemi Awolowo, Premier of Western Region, was accused of attempting to overthrow the government. This followed a period of conflict between the AG regional government and the central government. In spite of the flimsiness of the evidence presented by the government's prosecutors, he was convicted. With incarceration of Awolowo, Samuel Akintola took over as the premier of Western Region. Because Akintola was an ally of Ahmadu Bello, the undisputed strong man of Nigeria, Akintola was criticized as being a tool of the North. As premier of the West, Akintola presided over the most chaotic era in Western Region—one which earned it the nickname "the Wild-Wild West". However, as late as Thursday, 13 January 1966, Balewa had announced that the federal government was not going to intervene in the West. However, the very next day, Akintola, premier of the West met with his ally Ahmadu Bello, the Sardauna of Sokoto, premier of the North and party boss of NPC party to which Balewa belonged. At the same time a top-level security conference in Lagos was taking place which was attended by most of the country's senior army officiers. All of this activity created rumors that the Balewa government would be forced to crack down on lawlessness in the West using military might.

== See also ==
- Nigerian Civil War
- Second Nigerian Republic (1979–1983)
- Third Nigerian Republic (1993)
- Fourth Nigerian Republic (1999–present)

Region	Period	Governor	Premier	Notes
Eastern Region	Oct 1960 - Jan 1966	Francis Akanu Ibiam	Michael Okpara	
Mid-Western Region	Aug 1963 - Feb 1964	Dennis Osadebay	Dennis Osadebay (Administrator)	Region created from part of Western Region on 8 August 1963
Mid-Western Region	Feb 1964 - Jan 1966	Jereton Mariere	Dennis Osadebay	
Northern Region	Oct 1960 - 1962	Gawain Westray Bell	Ahmadu Bello	
Northern Region	1962 - Jan 1966	Kashim Ibrahim	Ahmadu Bello	
Western Region	Oct 1960 - May 1962	Adesoji Aderemi	Samuel Ladoke Akintola	
Western Region	May 1962 - Dec 1962	Adesoji Aderemi	Moses Majekodunmi (Administrator)	Administrator appointed during political crisis
Western Region	Jan 1963 - Jan 1966	Joseph Fadahunsi	Samuel Akintola	
