= 1960–61 Nigerian regional elections =

Regional elections were held in Nigeria in 1960 and 1961. The elections were held in Western Region in July 1960, in Northern Region in May 1961 and in Eastern Region in November 1961.

== Results ==
=== Eastern Region ===
Party	Seats
National Council of Nigerian Citizens	106
Action Group	15
Dynamic Party	5
Independents	20
Total	146
Source: Sternberger et al.

=== Northern Region ===
Party	Seats
Northern People's Congress	156
Action Group–UMBC	9
NCNC–NEPU	1
Total	166
Source: Sternberger et al.

=== Western Region ===
Party	Seats
Action Group	79
NCNC–NEPU	33
Mabolaje Grand Alliance	10
Total	122
Source: Sternberger et al.
