= Zanna Bukar Dipcharima =

Nigerian politician

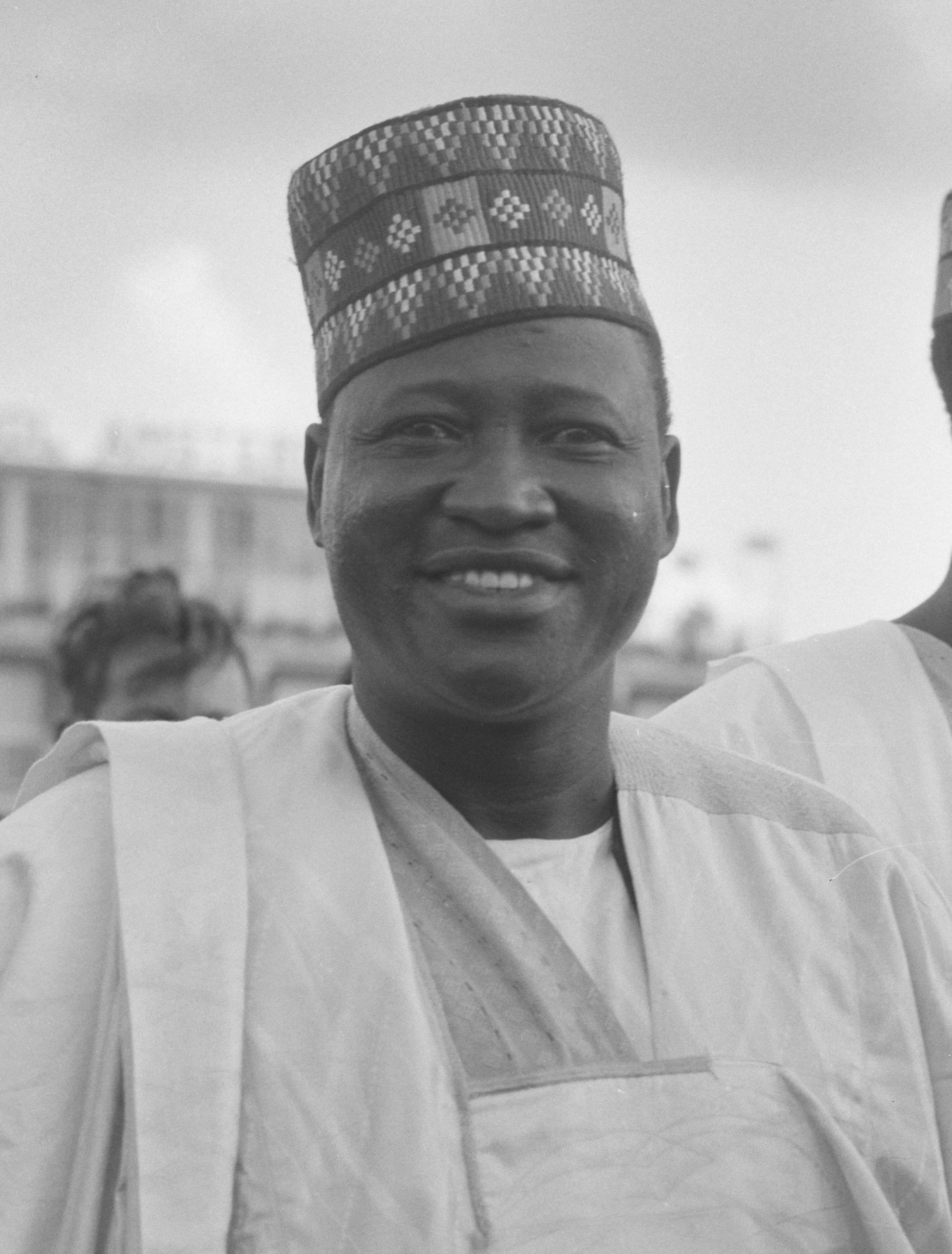

Minister of Transport
- In office 1964–1966
- Preceded by: Raymond Njoku
- Succeeded by: Joseph Tarka

Minister of Commerce and Industry
- In office 17 July 1961 – 1964
- Preceded by: Raymond Njoku
- Succeeded by: Augustus Akinloye

Member of the House of Representatives of Nigeria from Borno Province
- In office 1959–1966
- Preceded by: position established
- Succeeded by: position abolished
- Constituency: Yerwa
- In office 1954–1958
- Succeeded by: position abolished
- Constituency: Borno Central

Personal details
- Born: Bukar Suloma Dipcharima; 1917 Dipchari village, Bornu Province, Northern Region, Colonial Nigeria
- Died: 1969 (aged 51–52)
- Party: Northern People's Congress (1954–1966)

Zanna Bukar Dipcharima (1917–1969) was a Nigerian politician who was active during the Nigerian First Republic, he was a member of the House of Representatives and later appointed a Minister in the administration of Tafawa Balewa. He was a former Minister of Commerce and Industry and also of Transport.

== Early life and education ==
Zanna Bukar Dipcharima was born in 1917 at Dipchari village in the Bornu Province (now in Borno State) of Northern Nigeria. His father, Lawan Dipchari, was a Kanuri District Head. He attended the Maiduguri Middle School and later trained as a teacher at the Katsina Higher Training College.

== Career and politics ==
Dipcharima began his career as a teacher, working at various schools from 1938 until 1946 when he embarked on a political career. He first joined the National Council of Nigeria and the Cameroons (NCNC), a party led by Dr Nnamdi Azikwe, and was in the party's delegation to Britain in 1947. Dipcharima left the NCNC to work as a manager for the British trading company John Holt in Bida.

In 1954, he resigned his managerial position to re-enter politics after he was invited by the Borno Province branch Northern People's Congress (NPC) to assume its presidency. He was elected into the Borno Native Authority and was prominent in its drive against corruption.

Dipcharima later became the head of the Yerwa District in 1956, taking the traditional title of Zanna. He won a seat in the Federal House of Representatives in Lagos in 1954 and was made Parliamentary Secretary in the Ministry of Transport. He became Minister of State without Portfolio in 1957 and later Minister of Commerce and Industry. As Federal Minister of Commerce and Industry, he traveled to U.S in the fall of 1963 to seek American commercial interests in the development of manufacturing in Nigeria, a move if successful will reduce the influence of deeply entrenched British firms in the economy. While there, he informed interested firms a promise of absence of racial antagonism and a tax holiday.

In 1964, Dipcharima took the portfolio of the Minister of Transport and was holding this office when the federal civilian government was overthrown in the military coup of 15 January 1966. In the aftermath of the coup, he presided over the Cabinet that handed over power to the armed forces in the absence of the abducted Prime Minister Abubakar Tafawa Balewa.

== Legacy ==
The headquarters of the Federal Ministry of Transportation in Abuja is named after him.

The cap frequently worn by Dipcharima, at the time known as the "Yemenee cap," became closely associated with him. Today, this cap has gained widespread popularity and is now referred to as the 'Zanna cap' in his honor.
