= Monguno (surname) =

Monguno is a surname. Notable people with the surname include:

- Babagana Monguno (born 1957), Nigerian general and politician
- Mohammed Tahir Monguno (born 1966), Nigerian politician
- Shettima Ali Monguno, Nigerian politician
