= Kano People's Party =

- Chairperson: Alhaji Abubakar Uba
- Founded: 1963
- Dissolved: 1966
- Headquarters: Kano
- Ideology: Kano nationalism Social liberalism
- Colours: White, Black

The Kano Peoples Party was a Nigerian political party in the first republic. Formed in 1963, it soon became the second largest opposition party in Northern Nigeria overtaking the United Middle Belt Congress. In 1966, the Party was proscribed along with other political parties by the military.

== History ==
In 1963, an internal crisis within the government of Northern Nigeria led to the Abdication of the Emir of Kano, Sir Muhammadu Sanusi. This spurred a wave of Nationalist protest from young Kanoans who perceived the Governments actions as having infringed on the province's autonomy. In 1963, these protests turned into open political rebellion with Tijjaniyya Sufi's led by Abubakar Uba proclaiming the KPP and calling for complete Kanoan independence from Kaduna. Kano being the largest province in the region quickly gave the KPP a formidable foothold in Regional politics and sparked a wave of reprisal attacks from the NPC dominated Provincial Native Authority Before the 1964 election, all but a few members of the Party's National Committee had been imprisoned or were facing trial; this forced the party into an alliance with other Regional opposition parties in the Northern Progressive Front.

== Proscription ==
By 1965, the KPP had withdrawn from the Northern Progressive Front and had decided to strictly pursue Kanoan independence, however on 15 January 1966, while preparations for the 1968 general elections were going on, Nigeria's First Republic was overthrown and all political parties in the country including the KPP were proscribed.

== Legacy ==
In 1967, Kanoan Nationalism scored a reticent victory when The Kano Province was officially granted marginal autonomy as a state separate from the rest of Northern Nigeria and in 1982, the government of Kano under Abubakar Rimi and the People's Redemption Party ended the long Exile of Sir Sanusi.
