= Ibrahim Tako =

Nigeria politician

Galdiman Bida Ibrahim Tako OON

Minister of State for the Army
- In office 1965–1968
- Succeeded by: Chief Obande

Member of the Northern House of Assembly
- In office 1962–1965
- Succeeded by: Post abolished

Personal details
- Born: 1916 Bida, Nigeria
- Died: 1978
- Party: Northern People's Congress
- Education: University of Exeter
- Occupation: Teacher, politician

Ibrahim Tako or Galadiman Bida (1916–1978) was a Nigeria politician, teacher former federal minister for state and acting Minister of Defence in 1969.

== Background ==
Born in Bida, his father Aliyu Galadima was the galadiman Bida a chieftain title. He began his education at Bida Primary School in 1927 and Niger Middle School from 1930 to 1933 then in 1933 he attended Katsina Higher College till 1936 and gained his higher elementary certificate in 1936 then he went to Exeter University Preliminary Certificate for public administration in 1951 finished in 1954.

== Career ==
Tako started his career in Niger Middle School in 1938 at Bida there he taught for eight-year till 1948 later he was local government central and district Administration education development Councillor from 1956 to 1959 and was chairman committee of Police Affairs and Civil Commissioner in Lagos before moving to Lagos he was chief scribe Bida Native Authority.

He held membership position of Northern Region Development Corporation, Provincial Education Committee, Liquor Board, Niger Provincial Appointment Advisory Committee, Finance Committee Bida Native Authority and chaired the Establishment and Disciplinary Committed of Bida, Director Arabian Transport Nigeria, Traoion Limited and head the Northern Representative of the National Council of Red Cross.

== Political career ==
He was elected member House of Representative in 1962 under the platform of old Northern People Congress before becoming minister.

In 1965 he became the Minister of State for the Army before then he was parliament secretary in ministry of defence and was also acting Minister of Defence in 1969.

In the 1960s when he was Minister for the Army he had a visit with other officers like Yakubu Gowon accompanies him to Government College Bida to encourage the northern students in army career, amongst the students Jonathan Ndagi listed are Sani Bello, Gado Nasko, Mamman Vatsa, Ibrahim Babangida, Abdulsalami Abubakar, Sani Sami, Garba Duba and Mohammad Magoro accepted the advice and as a minister for army he enrolled them into the career.

== 1966 coup ==
At the time of 1966 coup when Sir Ahmadu Bello frontier was dissolved and coming of General Agunyi Ironsi into power, the first military reign started and he was appointed Northern Western State Commissioner of Health and Social Service in 1967 till the brought of coup d'tat in 1975 when the government of General Murtala Muhammed dissolved all the political positions.

Ibrahim Tako who is also known as Galadiman Bida a chieftain title when he was minister had a clash with Chukwuma Kaduna Nzeogwu who at the time was newly posted as chief instructor of Nigerian Military Training College, Kaduna and as a military intelligency in a chaos of some northern young military officers which he had problems of control in them and amongst are few recruited by Tako.
