= Jacob Obande =

Nigerian businessman

Jacob Obande was a Nigerian businessman from the old Northern region. He was a minister of state in charge of the Nigerian Army during the Nigerian First Republic. In 1959, he was the parliamentary secretary to Prime Minister Tafawa Balewa.
