= List of organizations that joined to form the NCNC =

Organizations that joined together in August 1944 to form the National Council of Nigeria and the Cameroons:

- T.U.C. of Nigeria
- National Democratic Party
- Associated Press (Zikist)
- Demobilized Soldiers Union
- Calabar Improvement League
- Lagos Market Women Union
- Ebute Butchers Union (Lagos)
- Tailors Union of Nigeria
- Bamenda Improvement Association
- Nigerian Union of Students
- Yaba Estate Social Club
- Ahoada District Union
- Council of Ijebu National Societies
- Ekpoma Progress Union
- Ezi Wlefare League
- Igbotako Progressive Society
- Igbanke Union
- Ijebu Igbo Patriotic Society
- Ila Patriotic Union
- Ipetu Improvement Union
- Kwale Improvement Union
- West African Union of Seamen
- Nigeria Reconstruction Group
- Youths Literary Improvement
- Association of Master Tailors
- Commercial Biz League
- Farmers Committee of West Africa
- Akure Federal Union
- Council of Ijesha Societies
- Enugu Divisional Union
- Ishan Progress Union
- Ekpoma Progress Union
- Ezi Wlefare League
- Igbotako Progressive Society
- Igbanke Union
- Ijebu Igbo Patriotic
- Ila Patriotic Union
- Ipetu Improvement Union
- Kwale Improvement Union Seamen
- Nigeria Reconstruction Group
- Youths Literary Improvement
- Association of Master Tailors
- Commercial Biz League
- Farmers Committee of West Africa
- Akure Federal Union
- Council of Ijesha Societies
- Egbado Improvement Union
- Enugu Divisional Union
- Ekiti Parapo Society
- Mbaise Union
- Edo National Union
