= Eyo Ita =

Nigerian educationist and politician

Prof. Eyo Ita

Premier of Eastern Region of Nigeria
- In office 1951–1953
- Succeeded by: Nnamdi Azikiwe

Leader of Government Business, Eastern Region of Nigeria
- In office 1951–1953

Minister for Natural Resources

Personal details
- Born: 1903 Mkpanak, Ibeno
- Died: 1972 (aged 68–69)
- Party: N.C.N.C
- Profession: Educationist Politician

Eyo Ita /ˈeɪjoʊ ˈitɑː/ (1903–1972) was a Nigerian educationist and politician from Eket Division in Uyo Province, who was the leader of the Eastern Government of Nigeria in 1951 and the second Professor in Nigeria. He was one of the earliest Nigerian students who studied in the United States instead of the frequent route of studying in the United Kingdom. He was a deputy national president of the National Council of Nigeria and the Cameroons (NCNC) in the late 1940s and early 1950s.

== Early life and education ==
Eyo Ita was a native of the former Eket Division in Uyo Province and was born in Mkpanak, in present-day Ibeno Local Government Area of Akwa Ibom State.

Ita attended the Presbyterian Hope Waddell Training School in Calabar before pursuing his tertiary education at London University and Columbia University in New York. He stayed in the U.S. for 8 years.

While in Calabar, he was exposed to the teachings of James Aggrey, who pursued academic opportunities for African students in Historical Black Colleges and Universities in America. Calabar became a training ground for some nationalist politicians due to the early site of secondary schools in the city and the influence of people like James Agrrey.

== Nigerian nationalism ==
Ita was a leading Nigerian nationalist during British colonial rule. Upon his return from the United States, he formed the Nigerian Youth Movement (NYM) in 1934 and galvanized the Nigerian youths for nationalism. The cannons of the Youth Charter adopted in 1937 centered on nationalism, inter-tribal harmony and a greater tomorrow. The Youth Movement became catalyst for championing Nigeria's independence from Britain. The return of Nnamdi Azikiwe from the United States in 1937 added more prominent Nigerians into the movement.

== Political career ==
In the 1930s, Ita was a member of two movements in West Africa, the Youth movement and the Education movement. He was a member of the former with the establishment of the Nigerian Youth League in Calabar and he also campaigned vigorously for education as a tool of freeing the African mind and soul and liberating it from forces of political repression. He formed the Nigerian Youth Movement in 1934 which rapidly expanded with the addition of Nnamdi Azikiwe in 1938. He later became the proprietor of the West African People's Institute in Calabar. He joined the National Council of Nigeria and the Cameroons (NCNC) in the 1940s and was elected vice president after the death of Herbert Macaulay, which saw Nnamdi Azikiwe emerging as the new leader of the party. Eyo Ita left NCNC to form the National Independence Party (NIP), which became one of the five Nigerian political parties that sent representatives to the July 27, 1953 London Conference on Nigerian Constitution.

Some of his mentors were W. E. B. Du Bois and Edward Wilmot Blyden, who were notable Pan-Africanists of their eras.

=== National Independence Party ===
In 1946, the Richards Constitution which advanced a regional political framework for the country to enhance regional political and economic autonomy became law. The constitution was made law without the proper consultation of Nigerians, leading to Nnamdi Azikiwe and Eyo Ita opposing the regional political arrangement, while they presented a minority report of a federation of eight states. However, in 1951, the constitution was reviewed with minor changes to the original but opposed by Azikiwe. The major politicians of the time resorted to work within their ethnic and regional base as a foundation to gain political power, this led to regional politics and concentration of power in regional and federal ministers, who were largely nominated by the party and the regional House of Assemblies. In 1951, major elections were held in the Eastern region of Nigeria with Eyo Ita becoming leader of the Eastern government and Azikiwe, leader of opposition in the Western Regional Assembly, a potential obscure position in light of his national repute.

A few federal ministers, however, from the NCNC supported a trial run of the Macpherson Constitution of 1951, in contravention of Azikiwe's view of opposition. The ministers had an ally in Eyo Ita. This led to internal wrangling, and a power struggle began, leading to the exit of some of the ministers and Eyo Ita. The new group later formed the National Independence Party, and Eyo Ita later became a member of the movement for the creation of the Calabar, Ogoja and Rivers State (COR State). He left the movement, however, and re-joined the NCNC in 1956.
