= Niger Delta Congress =

Socio-Political Organization

The Niger Delta Congress (NDC) is a socio-political organization of the ethnic nationalities of the Niger Delta region. The NDC was established on 26 December 2019 in Port-Harcourt, Rivers State, to serve the purpose of uniting the minority nationalities of the Niger Delta region as a means to achieving political and economic autonomy for the peoples of the region. The NDC is under the leadership of an executive council that comprises representatives of the different nationalities that make up the region. The current executive of the NDC which is in acting capacity is led by Nubari Saatah as President, and Mudiaga Ogboru as its National Spokesperson.

== Political activism ==
According to the draft constitution of the Niger Delta Congress:

"The NIGER DELTA CONGRESS is a movement for the economic and political emancipation of the peoples of the Niger Delta region of present day Nigeria. The NDC as an organization is created to bring together the minority nationalities of the Niger Delta region, including socio-political organizations, non-governmental organizations, community-based organizations, activists, and trade and labour groups which share the aspirations of the peoples of the Niger Delta towards achieving economic and political autonomy for the region and its peoples. The NIGER DELTA CONGRESS is founded on the necessity of protecting the economic and political rights and freedoms of the different ethnic nationalities of the region, which have since before independence been assaulted by the major ethnic nationalities of the Nigerian state, in their bid to ensure complete domination and subjugation of the Delta peoples, so as to guarantee minimal resistance and the seamless looting and pillaging of the human and natural resources of the peoples of the Niger Delta."

in June 2020, the NDC through its Spokesman Adokiye Oyagiri warned oil companies from taking part in the bidding process instituted by Nigeria's Department for Petroleum Resources (DPR) for 57 oil wells. The NDC cited the destruction of the Niger Delta environment and the economic deprivation of the people as major reasons for its call, and warned prospective bidders that they were taking a risk and the initiative would be resisted by the group.

In August 2020, Adokiye Oyagiri called for the political autonomy of the Niger Delta region after statistics from the NBS revealed unemployment and underemployment in the Niger Delta region was higher than all other regions.

The Niger Delta Congress has also claimed that the Niger Delta region is owed $75 billion by the Nigerian government for unremitted revenues, and compensations due to the negative externalities of oil exploration on Niger Delta communities.

== Previous Existence ==
The Niger Delta Congress was one of the small political parties in Nigeria's First Republic. The party generated most of its support from minorities in the Eastern Region of Nigeria. The party was formed by Harold Biriye and some southern minority leaders, principally from Degema, Ogoni, Brass and Western Ijaw divisions. The party entered into an alliance with the Northern People's Congress, at the time, the alliance was seen by some as one of strange bedfellows. However, NPC, which had federal ministers in Lagos, may have been courting southern groups to present a national outlook and to have alliances with groups close to trading posts and Biriye was looking for a powerful ally to guarantee seats for his new party in the Eastern region and on the boards of the Special Area commission.

In its manifesto, the party promised the initiation of a Federal Territory status for the Degema, Ogoni, Brass, and Western Ijaw divisions, promoting the culture of the people of the Niger Delta, quality education and financial assistance to the fishermen from the delta, protection of timber resources, the improvement of communications and the scheduling of certain towns as recognized ports. Chief Melford Okilo who eventually was elected as a governor of Rivers state won his first parliamentary election on this platform.
