= Igala Union =

Igala Union was a political union in Nigeria during the nation's first republic. The union was originally made up of members from a powerful Igala group who were sympathetic to the Northern People's Congress. The union won four House of Representatives seats in the 1959 parliamentary elections.
