= Ronald Wraith =

British scholar

Ronald Edward Wraith (born 10 April 1908, date of death 22 Jun 1991) was a British scholar on public and colonial administration. He was chairman of the Nigerian Federal Electoral Commission in the late 1950s. Wraith was head of the electoral commission that organized the registration and conduct of the 1959 parliamentary and regional elections.

== Life ==
Wraith was born in Derby, Derbyshire; his father worked for the Midland Railway. He studied economics at University of Birmingham. He spent two years in Australia and New Zealand before becoming the warden at a Tyneside community center managed by the Tyneside Council of Social Services when the worst of the Great Depression was over. In 1938, he joined the Education Department of the Borough of Southampton as the Secretary of Youth Services and served in the position through World War II. In 1945, he was the head of the London School of Economics's department involved in colonial studies, also known as the Colonial Social Science Certificate Course that was previously headed by Audrey Richards. In 1946, he visited Africa and worked with the Housing and Social Services Department of Gold Coast. In 1947, he was placed in charge of another course, the Post War Devonshire Courses for colonial and West African administrators. Wraith later published a book on local government, comparing the West African and the English local government systems and expressing doubt about the transferability of the English model to West Africa.

He was a researcher with the University of Ibadan before his appointment as the only expatriate in the Nigerian electoral commission.

Wraith went on to write several books on corruption, local government and public administration in developing countries. He was also a member of the research staff of the Institute of Local Government (INLOGOV), University of Birmingham.

== Personal ==
Wraith married his wife, Jane in 1933. Both were members of the Society of Friends.

== Works ==
- Administrative tribunals. Allen & Unwin. ISBN 9780043470022
- East African citizen. Oxford University Press, 1960.
- Local Administration in West Africa. Holmes & Meier, 1972. ISBN 0-8419-0123-6
- Corruption in developing countries. Allen & Unwin, 1963.ISBN 978-0415846820
- Open Government: The British Interpretation. ISBN 0-900628-15-4
