= Inuwa Wada =

Nigerian politician

Muhammadu Inuwa Wada (c. 1917 – 25 November 2015) was a parliamentarian and minister of Works and Survey under the administration of Tafawa Balewa. He was a veteran parliamentarian towards the end of the Nigerian first republic and was given the Defense portfolio in 1965 after the death of Muhammadu Ribadu. He was first elected in 1951 as a member of the Northern House of Assembly, he was subsequently nominated to the Federal House of Representatives and was a member and later minister from 1951 to 1966. Inuwa Wada was known by many as a quiet figure in contrast to the hectic demands of his ministerial portfolio in the Works department which was going through a period of increased focus on major developmental projects as part of a six-year plan during the early 1960s.

== Life ==
Born in 1917 to a respected family in Kano, he is a relative of Malam Aminu Kano, Alhaji Aminu Bashir Wali and the father of the former Head of State Murtala Mohammed, his grandfather was Chief Alkali during the early twentieth century and his father worked as a surveyor for the Kano Native Authority before his death in 1924. Wada attended Shuhuci Elementary School and in 1938, he graduated from the Kano Middle School. He then went on to train as a teacher at the Katsina Higher College from 1933 to 1938 and later became a teacher in Kano where he taught history, English and geography and also edited a paper, 'Yadda Yake Yau'. After putting nine years in teaching, he left the profession for the offices of the Kano Native Authority and worked there as a clerk, chief scribe and information officer.

== Politics ==
Wada began in politics in 1945 and was a founding member of the Northern People's Congress. While in the NPC, he was the party's secretary and national organizer. In the 1950s, he served on the board of the Nigerian College of Arts, Science and Technology, the Nigerian Coal Corporation and the Nigerian Groundnut Marketing Board. In the 1964 election, he had to contend with a Young NEPU candidate who was a School teacher by name Musa Said Abubakar Magami and future governor of Kano, Abubakar Rimi who contested as an independent candidate but all of them pulled out of the race before the elections were contested. Wada is a paternal uncle of the late Murtala Mohammed, former Nigerian Head of State. He ran a fairly successful transport business after the 1966 coup that abolished the first republic. He also remained an influential conservative figure in the Northern region after the coup.

== Business career ==
Wada secured a loan from the Nigerian Industrial Development Bank to start his first manufacturing venture, a match making company. He later owned interest in at least five other business ventures including a transport company. His breakthrough in the transport sector occurred when he bought 50 lorries for a small deposit, other ventures included the Nigerian Spanish Engineering Company, Kanol Paints, Arewa Industries, Standard Industrial Industries and Nigerian Enamelware Company.

== Electoral history ==
1959 Sumaila parliamentary election:

Inuwa Wada NPC – 26,149
Mohammed Achimolo Garba NEPU – 2,231
Sule Baba AG – 456
