= Bello Dandago =

Nigerian politician (1908–1997)

Bello Dandago was a Nigerian politician who served as Chief Whip and later the Deputy Speaker of the House of Representatives of the First Nigerian Republic.

Bello Dandago was born in 1908 in Kano and served as a classroom teacher, a radio broadcaster, active member of Nigerian People's Congress and a traditional ruler where he became one of the king makers in Kano Emirate.

== Education ==
He attended Kano Provincial School (now Rumfa College, Kano) between 1922 and 1927 and proceeded to the famous Katsina Higher College in 1927 and completed in 1932.

== Career ==
He taught in the Middle School from 1932 and 1941 then became North's pioneer international broadcaster from 1941 to 1944 when he and Isa Kaita worked in Zoy as newscasters and programme officers in Accra Ghana. When the European editors of Gaskiya visited them in Ghana, they had interviews in Hausa. The visitors realized how the two Hausa journalists have been doing a remarkable job and gained considerable reputation among the local people. They also commended that Dandago "would rank a first-class broadcaster in any language". He became Studio Manager and broadcasting officer of the Radio Distribution Services RDS in Kano from 1944 to 1948.

== Politics ==
After years of political activities, Dandago was elected into the Federal House of Representatives representing Gwarzo East under the platform of Northern People's Congress NPC. He was once the Chief Whip of the House and later he became the Deputy Speaker of the House from 1963 to 1966.

== Traditional Title ==
He was appointed Ward Head (Wakili) of villages outside the Kano city, a position he held from 1948 to 1952. He was promoted to Sarkin Dawaki Mai Tuta the District Head of Jahun in 1952, a title he held until his demise.

== Awards ==
In 1959, Dandago was honoured with the title of Officer of the Order of the British Empire.

== Death ==
He died in April, 1977 as the District Head of Jahun.
