= Ministry of Transportation (Nigeria) =

Government department in Nigeria

Federal Ministry of Transportation

Agency overview
- Jurisdiction: Federal Republic of Nigeria
- Headquarters: Bukar Dipcharima House, Central Business District, Abuja
- Annual budget: ₦167.29 billion (2024)
- Minister responsible: Sa'idu Ahmed Alkali, Federal Minister of Transportation
- Agency executive: Olorunola Olufemi, Permanent Secretary
- Website: transportation.gov.ng

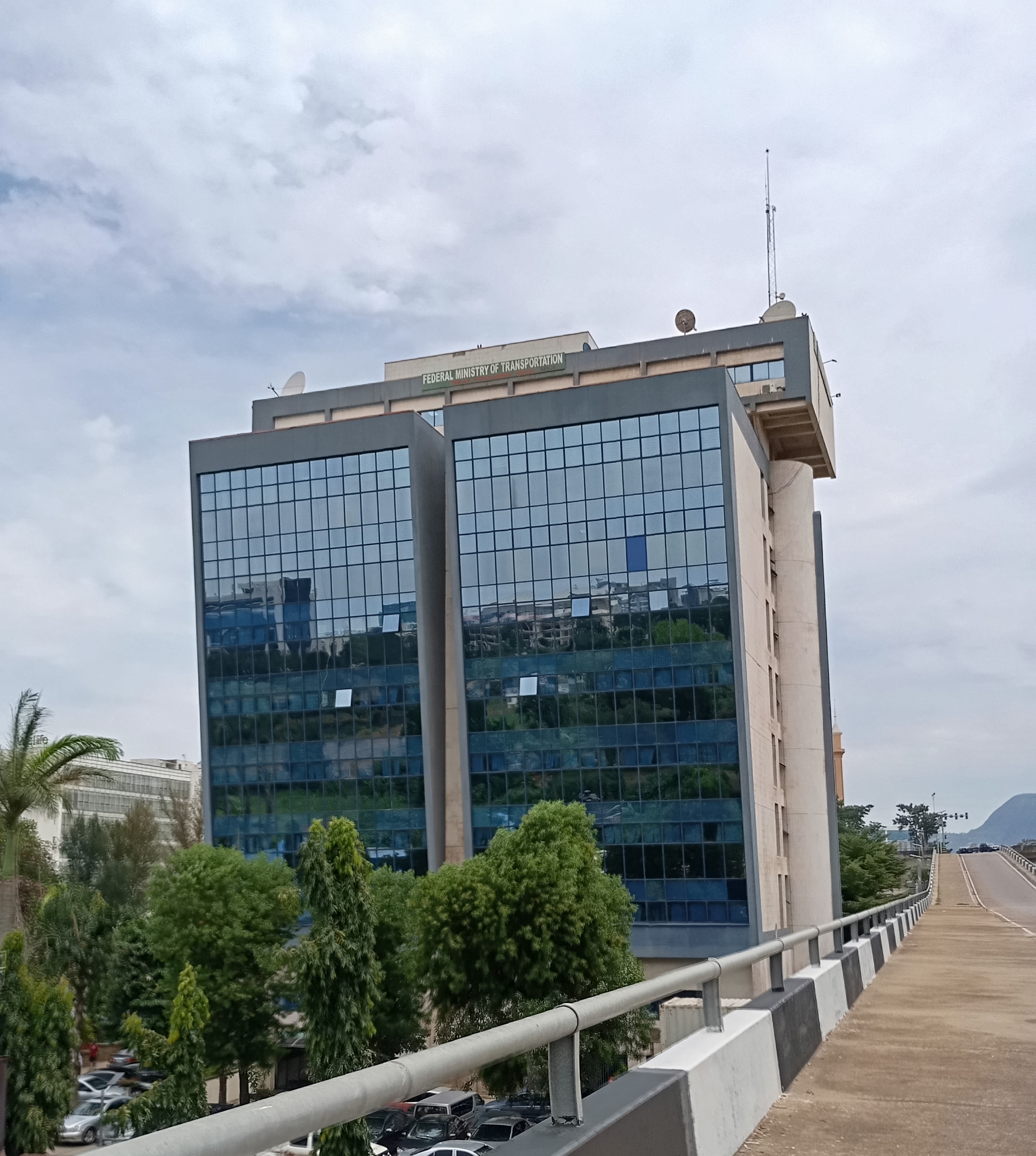
Headquarters

The Ministry of Transportation is a ministry of the federal government of Nigeria responsible for regulating and overseeing the movement of people and goods across the country. Sa'idu Ahmed Alkali is the Minister of Transportation. The ministry oversees aviation, road and rail transport.
