= Ayo Rosiji =

Nigerian politician

Chief Ayo Rosiji

Minister for Health
- In office 30 August 1957 – 12 December 1959
- Prime Minister: Abubakar Tafawa Balewa
- Preceded by: Position established
- Succeeded by: Waziri Ibrahim

Personal details
- Born: Ayotunde Rosiji; 24 February 1917 Abeokuta, Ogun State, Nigeria
- Died: 31 July 2000 (aged 83)
- Party: Action Group
- Spouse: Gbemisola Rosiji
- Occupation: Politician and statesman

Chief Ayotunde Rosiji (24 February 1917 – 31 July 2000) was a Nigerian politician, who served as Minister for Health and Minister of Information.

== Biography ==
Chief Rosiji and Charles, Prince of Wales at the official opening ceremony of the Musical Society of Nigeria (MUSON) Centre in Lagos. For its first few years and until this centre was built MUSON concerts, recitals and performances were held at Chief Rosiji's Apapa residence.

He was born in Abeokuta, Ogun State, on 24 February 1917 to the family of an Egba policeman. Rosiji attended Christ Church Primary School, Abeokuta, and then Ibadan Grammar School and Government College, Ibadan, for secondary education. He was also educated at the Yaba Higher College, where he received a civil engineering certificate. He subsequently went abroad to study for a law degree at the University of London in London, England after working at Shell Nigeria as an engineer. Returning to Nigeria, he became one of the founding members of the Action Group.

== Personal life ==
Oloye Rosiji died on 31 July 2000. He was married to Gbemisola Rosiji (nee Mann).
