= Muhammadu Ribadu =

Nigerian politician (1909–1965)

Mahmudu Ribadu Waziri of Adamawa, MBE
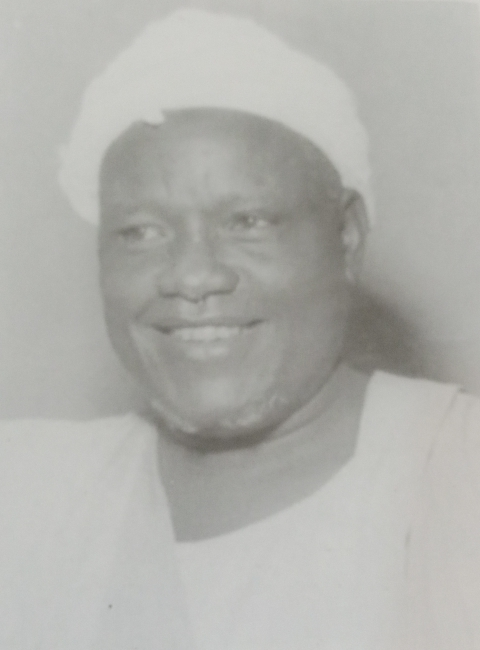

Minister of Defence
- In office 1960–1965
- Prime Minister: Abubakar Tafawa Balewa
- Preceded by: Office established
- Succeeded by: Inuwa Wada

Member of Parliament in the House of Representatives
- In office 1959 – 1 May 1965
- Preceded by: Office established
- Succeeded by: Bashiru Muhammadu Ribadu
- Constituency: Adamawa Central

Personal details
- Born: 1909 Ribadu, Yola Province, Northern Nigeria Protectorate (now in Adamawa State, Nigeria)
- Died: 1 May 1965 (aged 55–56) Kaduna, Northern Region, Nigeria (now in Kaduna State)
- Party: Northern People's Congress
- Relations: Aisha Buhari (granddaughter); Muhammadu Buhari (grandson-in-law)
- Occupation: Politician

Mahmudu Ribadu (1909 – 1 May 1965) was a Nigerian politician, who was the first Minister of Defence after independence. The son of a district head from Adamawa's Balala district, he was educated at a Qur'anic school before proceeding to the Yola Middle School for conventional education.

== Early life and education ==
Ribadu was born in the village of Ribadu, old Adamawa Province. He was the son of Ardo Hamza, District Head of Balala, and Adda Wuro, the daughter of Alkali Hamman Joda from Yola. He is the grandfather of former Nigerian first lady Aisha Buhari. He started studies under the tutelage of Liman Yahaya, an Islamic scholar. He then attended Yola Middle School from 1920 to 1926. While in Yola, he received private tutorship under a colonial officer. Afterwards, he was a teacher at his alma mater, Yola middle school. He was made a treasurer at the Yola Native Authority in 1931. On the death of his father in October 1936, Ribadu became the district head of Balala. In 1946, he proceeded abroad on a scholarship from the British Council to study local government. Like a few of his colleagues who partook in the scholarship, after his return, he became interested in the nation's political process, he was appointed a member of the Northern House of Assembly in 1947 and was re-elected in 1951. In 1948, he served in the Hugh Foot committee of the Nigerianisation of senior posts in the civil service. A year later, he was a member of the Nigerian Board of Agriculture and he also served in the Northern Regional Development Loans Board. In 1950, he was a delegate to the Constitutional Review Conference in Ibadan.

== Political career ==
In 1952, he was made Minister for Natural Resources as part of an indigenous Council of Ministers. In 1954, he was elected the second vice-president of NPC and became literally, the third Northern Nigerian leader behind Ahmadu Bello, NPC's president and Tafawa Balewa, NPC's First Vice President. He was federal Minister of Land, Mines and Power in 1954, and in 1959, he was federal Minister of Land and Lagos Affairs. In 1960, he was appointed the Nigerian Minister of Defence.

=== Defence minister ===
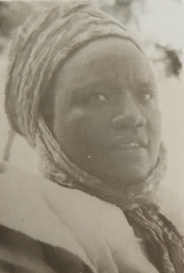

Ribadu took over the Ministry of Defence as the country became independent in 1960. His administration oversaw an increase in the numerical strength of the armed forces, an upgrade of military hardware, the development of the infant Navy and the establishment of a Nigerian Air Force. He also built and renovated military barracks across the country. His colleagues often refer to him as "power of powers". He completed the Nigerianisation of the Nigerian Army. He is credited as one of the most outstanding Defence Ministers Nigeria ever had. On 1 May 1965, he was to be honoured along with the then Prime Minister, Sir Abubakar Tafawa Balewa (1912–66) by the then Premier of Northern Nigeria, Sir Ahmadu Bello (1909–66) with gold medals of the Usmamiya order in Kaduna. He died on the morning of that day at the age of 55.

No doubt, Alhaji Ribadu was a towering figure. In Lagos he acted as deputy Prime Minister in all but name - with considerably more authority than Abubakar due to his stronger following in the Northern Region. Many also suspected that he was blackmailing the Sardauna - claiming that he 'possessed proof which he would use if necessary to show that the Sardauna's devotion to Islam was a sham' - and was thus able to exercise significant influence over the premier. While serving as Minister of Defence, Ribadu presided over a rapid expansion of the Nigerian Army, Navy as well as the creation of the Nigeria Air Force. He established the Defence Industries Corporation in Kaduna, the Nigerian Defence Academy in Kaduna and a Second Recce Squadron in Abeokuta. Many scholars and historians believe till today that if Ribadu had been alive, the January 1966 military coup could not have taken place.

Ribadu's official residence was later part of the Dodan Barracks, the official residence of Nigerian military rulers from 1967 to 1991.
