= Northern Progressive Front =

Nigerian political league

The Northern Progressive Front was a Nigerian labour body with political alignment with the then NPC Northern Nigeria political members. The Northern Progressive Front was organized by Malam Ibrahim Nock it was the trade union arm of the NPC which was the dominant northern party.
