= Igbira Tribal Union =

Political party in Nigeria

Igbira Tribal Union was a political organization formed by educated servicemen from Igbira Native Administration of Northern Nigeria, headed by George Ohikere. The union was one of the non Hausa–Fulani organizations that was affiliated with the dominant Northern People's Congress during the elections of the 1950s. However, there were strains in the political alliance with NPC in 1958–1959, with both parties presenting candidates for the 1959 parliamentary election.
