= Dynamic Party =

Nigerian political party

Dynamic Party was a Nigerian political party headed by the mathematician and scholar Chike Obi. It was inaugurated in Ibadan on April 7, 1951. The party embraced Kemalism, and was cautious about the early movement towards self-government.

The party was one of the first re-independence parties to publish a well-organized manifesto. In its manifesto, it sought to contest the mad rush towards self-government by the Action Group, embrace cooperation with Europeans and Americans, promote national loyalty and improve communications in Nigerian divisions, starting from Esan, Egbado and Ekiti.

Chike Obi summarized his views of Nigerian Kemalism as

Kemalism is a manifestation of what is known . . . as 'Totalitarianism of the left' as opposed to 'totalitarianism of the right', which differs from the former in that the latter believes in force as a permanent way of maintaining order, whereas the former when resorting to force is used only in order to quicken the pace of progress . . . Kemalism is a philosophy which in recognising the vital urgency for a backward country, to introduce western technology into her borders also recognises the necessity for the use of the weapon of total conscription, that is inter alia the necessity for the backward country to introduce into her borders western administration, language, way of life as much of these as is inseparable from western technology, and the suppression of any local pretensions which might be an obstacle to the declared aim of westernisation.

Some of the party's salient points included the recommendation and setting up of three military training schools and an 'institute of guerrilla warfare'. It also advocated the formation of a West African Republic made up of most of French, British, Spanish, and Portuguese West Africa, a West African 'Monroe Doctrine', and a defensive alliance with India against South Africa.
