= Shettima Ali Monguno =

Nigerian politician

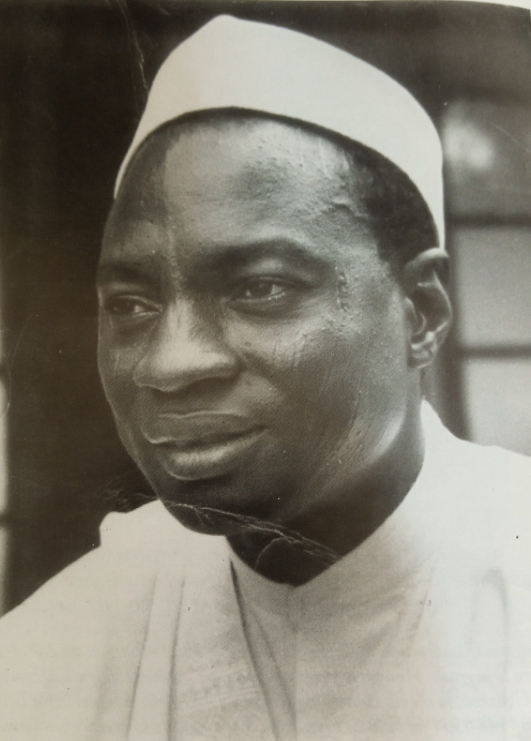

Shettima Ali Monguno, CFR (1926 – 8 July 2016) was a Nigerian educationalist and politician, born in 1926 in Monguno-Borno state. He attended Monguno Primary School, Teacher's College Bauchi and Katsina, College of Arts, Science and Technology, Zaria, Moray House College of Education and the University of Edinburgh.

He was M.P. in 1959, Education secretary and Councilor for Education, Works and Social Welfare, Borno Local Government, between 1959 and 1965. He served as the Minister for Air Force and Internal Affairs between 1965 and 1966, served as the Federal Commissioner for Trade and Industries between 1967 and 1971; and as Minister Mines and Power, Petroleum and Energy between 1972 and 1975.

Shettima Ali Monguno was also the president of OPEC between 1972 and 1973. He was the presidential candidate during the Option A4 elections in the early 1990s in Nigeria.

He was leader of the Nigerian delegation to UNCAD II, New Delhi, in 1968 and member of the Nigerian delegation to United Nations for over 10 years.

He received the keys to the cities of New York City, Louisville, Kentucky, USA; Quito, Ecuador; and Lima, Peru. He died in Maiduguri on 8 July 2016.

== Achievements ==
- Chairman Maiduguri Metropolitan Council 1977–78.
- Member Constituent Assembly 1977-78
- President of OPEC 1972-73
- Pro-chancellor University of Calabar 1978-80
- Pro-chancellor University of Nigeria 1980-84
- National honors Ethiopian Empire, Republic of Egypt, Sudan and Cameroon 1970
- Trustee Girl Guides Association of Nigeria 1970-90
- Deputy National Chairman National Party of Nigeria December 1980-84
- Conferred National Honor – Commander of the Order of the Federal Republic CFR 1982
- Director Nigbel Bank Nigeria Ltd 1988
- Chairman Borno Education Endowment Fund 1986
- Hon. Road Marshal
- Hon. Citizen of Oklahoma State, USA
- D.F. of WAEC Council Award 2003
