= Raymond Njoku =

Nigerian politician

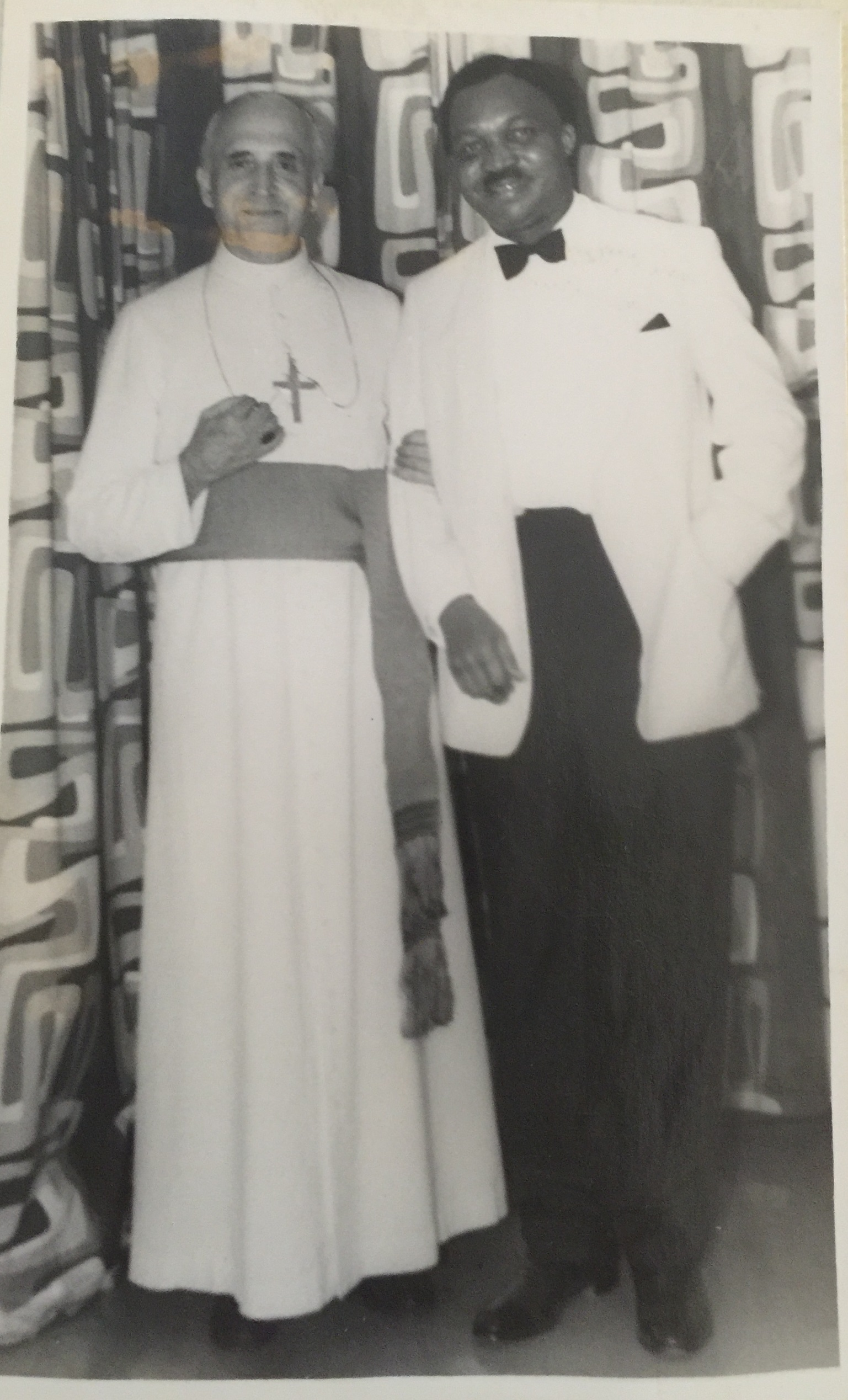
Raymond Njoku with a Catholic bishop

Raymond Amanze Njoku (August 1915 – 1977) was a Nigerian politician and former minister for Transport.

== Early life and education ==
The son of an Igbo Chief, he was born in Owerri and raised in a Roman Catholic household. He attended Our Lady's School at Emekuku, for primary education. Later on, at St Charles, college, Onitsha, where he was studying, he applied and won a scholarship that earned him an admission into a teachers training school. After brief stints at tutorship in various schools including St Gregory's College, Lagos and St Charles, Onitsha, he decided to change course and study law. After completing his Law studies at Cambridge: LLB Hons Peterhouse College Cambridge, England; he was called to the bar at Inner Temple.

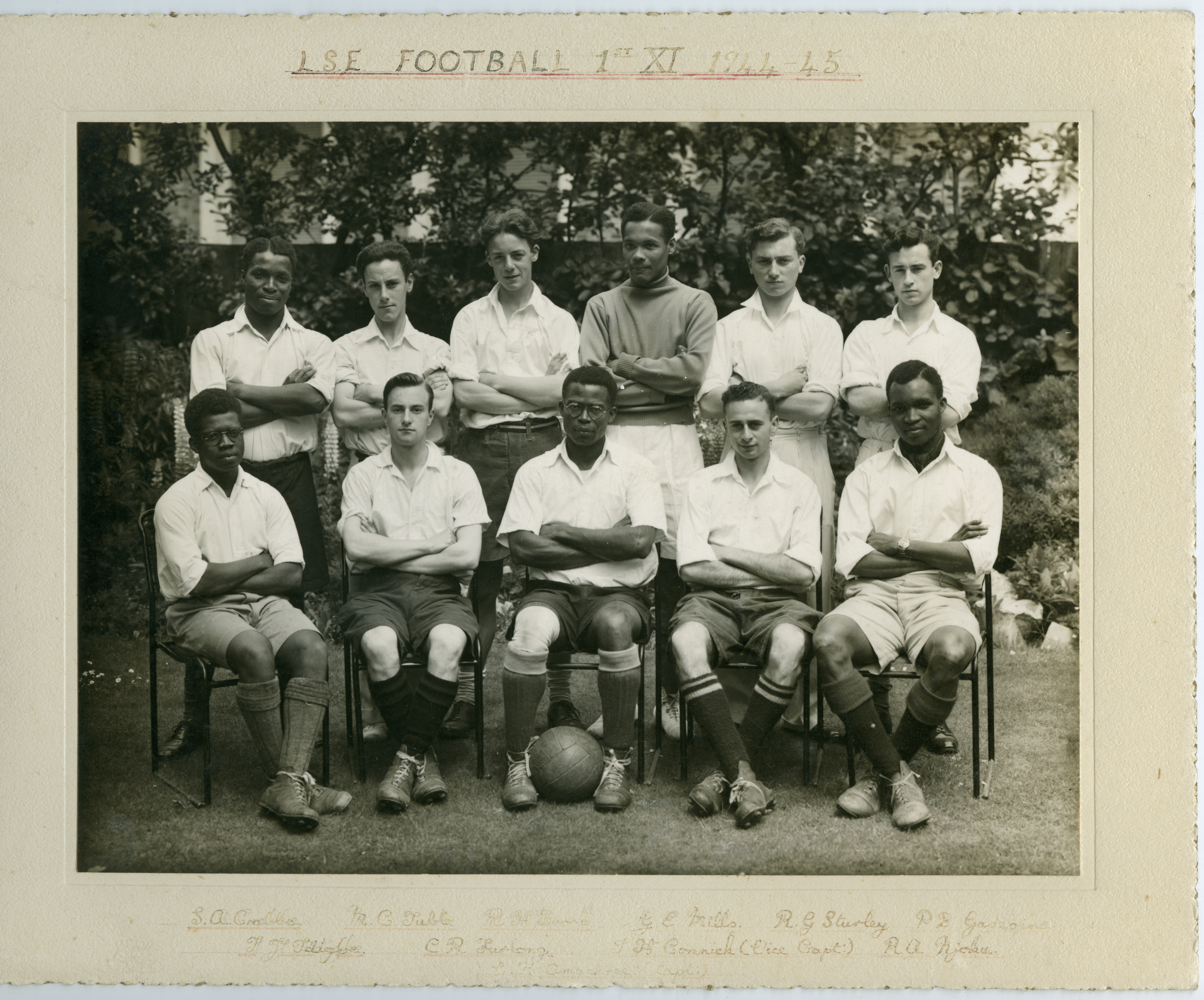
Njoku (front row on the right) on the London School of Economics Football 1st team 1944/45

== Political career ==
Njoku returned to Nigeria and was a successful lawyer in Aba, Eastern Nigeria, 1949–1954. He was president of Igbo State Union of Nigeria in succession to Dr Nnamdi Azikiwe; Vice President NCNC (National Council of Nigeria & the Cameroon), and also served the Aba community as the leader of the Aba Community League of the Ibo State Union. He contested for a regional seat in 1951, but was unsuccessful. However, in 1954, he was elected to the Federal House of Representative. He was appointed cabinet minister: Commerce & Industry, Transport & Aviation 1954- 1966. The final and definitive motion for Nigerian Independence on 1 October 1960 was moved by Prime Minister Abubakar Tafawa Balewa and endorsed by his cabinet colleague Raymond Njoku, minister of Trade & Industry. He was the chairman of the Commonwealth Parliamentary Association; addressed British parliamentarians, including Prime Minister Harold Macmillan, at the Guildhall, London. During the Biafra War Prime Minister Harold Wilson read his telegram to the House of Commons calling for a ceasefire. Sir Hugh Fraser, Duncan Sandys and Patrick Wall were among his members of parliament friends. Njoku was made a knight of St Sylvester & St Gregory by Pope Paul VI.
