= National Council of Nigeria and the Cameroons =

- Chairman: Herbert Macaulay
- Secretary-General: Nnamdi Azikiwe
- Founded: 1944
- Dissolved: 16 January 1966
- Headquarters: Lagos
- Ideology: Nigerian nationalism Social justice Zikist Faction: Zikism
- Political position: Big tent Zikist Faction: Left-wing

The National Council of Nigeria and the Cameroons (NCNC) (later changed to the National Convention of Nigerian Citizens), was a Nigerian nationalist political party from 1944 to 1966, during the period leading up to independence and immediately following independence.

== Foundation ==
The National Council of Nigeria and the Cameroons (Note: The name included 'Cameroons' because Cameroon had become an administrative part of Nigeria in 1945. Cameroon had been a colonial territory of Germany. Following the defeat of Germany and its allies in World War II, the United Nations confiscated the territories under the administration of Germany before World War II. These territories were then given to various victor countries to administer them in trust for the UN until they were mature for political independence. They were then called Trust Territories. Cameroon was handed over to Britain and France. There were two Cameroon territories under Britain. When Nigeria was preparing for the 1960 political independence, the people of the British Cameroons were consulted in a plebiscite on whether to go with Nigeria or join up with French Cameroon. Southern British Cameroon opted for unification with French Cameroon while Northern British Cameroon voted to remain with Nigeria. Thus, NCNC became National Council of Nigerian Citizens in 1959.) was formed in 1944 by Olayinka Herbert Macaulay. Herbert Macaulay was its first president, while Azikiwe was its first secretary. The NCNC was made up of a rather long list of nationalist parties, cultural associations, and labour movements that joined to form NCNC. The party at the time was the second to make a concerted effort to create a true nationalist party. It embraced different sets of groups from the religious, to tribal and trade groups with the exception of a few notable ones such as the Egbe Omo Oduduwa and early on the Nigerian Union of Teachers. Dr. Nnamdi Azikiwe became its 2nd president and Dr. M.I. Okpara, its 3rd president. Dr. Azikiwe went on to become the first indigenous President of Nigeria. The party is considered to be the third prominent political party formed in Nigeria after a Lagos-based party, the Nigerian National Democratic Party and the Nigerian Youth Movement formed by Professor Eyo Ita who became the Deputy National President of NCNC before he left the party to form his own political party called the National Independence Party. The NCNC was primarily associated with the Igbo.

== Pre-independence ==
The first test of the party came in the 1951 election. The party won majority votes in the Eastern Region of Nigeria's House of Assembly but became the opposition in the Western region with Azikiwe as the opposition leader representing Lagos. Although the Action Group (AG) won a plurality of the votes in the election, its prospects were uncertain as the NCNC could have secured a majority if it had been able to persuade the third party, which was an Ibadan community party and which had been viewed by the NCNC as its ally, to support it. This it was not able to achieve, and the AG therefore formed the government amid accusations of carpet-crossing by Azikiwe and his NCNC. This event is still viewed by some historiographers as the beginning of ethnic politics in Nigeria. Azikiwe later on became the Premier of Eastern Region, Nigeria in 1954.

During a national conference in 1954, the party opposed a call to include the right of secession by any of the regions – a stance which was later exploited by the North and the West to deny the East the right to secede in the Nigerian Civil War. It had argued that the country was not a league of forced nations, and it would be ruinous to include such a right. The policies of the party, from its inception favoured a countenance of determined expression for self-government and nationalism. The major aims of the party taken on subsequent campaigns at home and abroad were as follows.

- The extension of democratic principles and advancement of the interest of the people of Nigeria and Cameroons under British mandate.
- The impartation of political education to the people of Nigeria in order to prepare them for self-government.
- The provision of medium of expression for members of NCNC through which they would endeavour to secure for Nigeria and the Cameroons, political freedom, social equality, religious toleration and economic activity.

Executive members from November 1957 to August 1958 included:

- Nnamdi Azikiwe, National President and President of the Senate (Igbo, Methodist)
- J. O. Fadahunsi, First National Vice-president (Yoruba, Protestant)
- Eyo Ita, First National Deputy President (Ibibio-Efik Man, First Nigerian Professor)
- Raymond Njoku, Second National Vice-president (Igbo, Catholic)
- F. S. McEwen, National Secretary (Sierra Leone Creole of West Indian ancestry, Protestant)
- Festus Okotie-Eboh, National Treasurer, Federal Minister of Finance (Warri, Protestant)
- A. K. Blankson, National Auditor (Ghanaian, Protestant)
- Dennis Osadebay, National Legal Adviser (Igbo, Protestant)
- T. O. S. Benson, National Financial Secretary, Federal Minister of Information (Yoruba, Protestant)

== Post-independence ==
After Nigeria's independence, Azikiwe was Governor-General (1960–1963) and President (1963–1966). Dr. M.I.Okpara succeeded Azikiwe as Premier of Eastern Nigeria from 1959 to 1966. In 1966, a military coup ended Azikiwe's term as president, and the NCNC dissolved in the following turmoil.

By the late 1940s, the remnant of the Nigerian Youth Movement, now effectively a Western Nigeria political organisation, had decided to support the Action Group accusing the NCNC of ethnic imperialism. However, the Western opposition needed to tactically rev up local sentiments as its base was made up of local elites who depended little on nationalistic sentiment but on the local economic and political activity in their various towns and cities. During the Biafran war of secession, Azikiwe became a spokesman for the republic and an adviser to its leader, Chukwuemeka Odumegwu Ojukwu, before switching allegiance back to Nigeria and publicly appealing to Ojukwu to end the war. Azikiwe became chairman of the Nigerian People's Party in 1978, making unsuccessful bids for the presidency in 1979 and again in 1983.
