= Northern People's Congress =

Political party in Nigeria

Northern People's Congress Jamiyaar Mutanen Arewa (Hausa)
- Abbreviation: NPC
- Leader: Sir Ahmadu Bello
- Founders: Alhaji Tafawa Balewa; Sa'ad Zungur; Aminu Kano
- Founded: June 1943
- Dissolved: 16 January 1966
- Succeeded by: Arewa Consultative Forum
- Political position: Centre-right
- Colours: Black

The Northern People's Congress (NPC) is a political party in Nigeria. Formed in June 1943, the party held considerable influence in the Northern Region from the 1950s until the military coup of 1966. It was formerly a cultural organization known as Jamiyaar Mutanen Arewa. After the Nigerian Civil War of 1967, the NPC subsequently became a minor party.

== Notable members ==
- Sir Ahmadu Bello, party leader, the Sardauna of Sokoto, Premier of the Northern Region.
- Sir Alhaji Abubakar Tafawa Balewa, was the deputy leader of the party and Prime Minister of Nigeria.
- Makaman Bida, leader of the National Party of Nigeria in 1978.
- S. A. Ajayi, Kwara state chairman of NPC, a former parliamentary Secretary to Sardauna of Sokoto.
- Sule Katagum
- Muhammadu Ribadu
- Maitama Sule
- Ibrahim Imam
- Sir Shettima Kashim
- Ado Bayero
- Musa Yar'Adua
- Waziri Ibrahim
- Aminu Dantata
- Shehu Shagari
- Shettima Ali Monguno

== See also ==
- R. A. B. Dikko
