= 1943 Nigerian general election =

Partial general elections were held in Nigeria in 1943, with only two of the four elected seats available.

== Background ==
The previous general elections had been held in 1938. However, since the elections, two by-elections had been held; one in 1940 following the death of Olayinka Alakija and one in 1941 after Kofo Abayomi resigned from the Legislative Council.

Rather than hold fresh elections for all four seats, elections were held for the two seats whose members had served their full five year terms since 1942; the Calabar seat held by Okon Efiong and the Lagos seat held by H. S. A. Thomas. The appointed seats were also refreshed.

== Electoral system ==
The 1922 Nigeria (Legislative Council) Order in Council provided for a 46-member Legislative Council, of which 23 were ex-officio officials, four were nominated officials, up to 15 were appointed unofficial members and four were elected (three in Lagos and one in Calabar). The 23 ex officio officials included the governor, the chief secretary and their deputy, the lieutenant governors and secretaries of the Northern and Southern Provinces, the attorney general, the commandant of the Nigerian Regiment, the director of medical services, the treasurer, the director of marine, the comptroller of customs, the secretary of Native affairs, together with ten senior residents.

The franchise was restricted to men aged 21 or over who were British subjects or a native of Nigeria who had lived in their municipal area for the 12 months prior to the election, and who earned at least £100 in the previous calendar year. The right to vote was withheld from those who had been convicted of a crime and sentenced to death, hard labour or prison for more than a year, or were of "unsound mind". Only 341 people registered in Calabar, although the population of the town was 16,653 according to the 1931 census.

All eligible voters could also run as candidates unless they had an undischarged bankruptcy, had received charitable relief in the previous five years or were a public servant. Candidates were required to obtain the nomination of at least three registered voters and pay a £10 deposit. The term of the Legislative Council was five years.

== Campaign ==
The Calabar seat was contested for the first time since 1923. The incumbent Efiong was challenged by Gage Hewett Hall O'Dwyer and Otu Bassey Otu, with all three running as independents. A merchant of paternal Sierra Leone Creole ancestry and maternal Efik provenance, O'Dwyer was a member of the Calabar Township Advisory Board, head of the Calabar branch of the African Chamber of Commerce and the town's Special Constabulary. Otu was a chief who worked as a teacher and money lender. Efiong was popular amongst the local electorate and was supported by local chiefs, whilst O'Dwyer's heritage (although his mother was an Efik, his father was from Sierra Leone) counted against him.

The one Lagos seat was uncontested as E. A. Akerele was the only candidate. Akerele was a former vice-president of the Nigerian Union of Young Democrats, but ran as an independent.

== Results ==
Party	Votes	%	Seats	+/–
Independents	196	100.00	2	+1
Total	196	100.00	2	–2
Registered voters/turnout	341	–		
Source: Tamuno

=== By constituency ===
Lagos
Candidate	Party	Votes	%
Okon Efiong	Independent	122	62.24
Gage Hewett Hall O'Dwyer	Independent	73	37.24
Otu Bassey Otu	Independent	1	0.51
Total		196	100.00
Registered voters/turnout		341	–
Source: Tamuno

=== List of members ===
The Governor appointed 13 unofficial members to the Legislative Council, of which four were Europeans (down from seven in 1938) and nine were Africans (an increase from eight). The four Europeans represented the mining sector and the commercial interests of Kano, Lagos and Port Harcourt, with the banking, shipping and Calabar seats left vacant. The nine Africans represented British Cameroons, the Colony of Lagos, Ijebu, Ondo Oyo Province, Rivers district, the Egba, Ibibio and the Ibo, whilst the Benin and Warri seat was left vacant. After losing the election in Calabar, G H H Dwyer was appointed as the Ibibio member.

Constituency	Member
Elected members
Calabar	Okon Efiong
Lagos	E. A. Akerele
Lagos	Jibril Martin (elected in 1940)
Lagos	Ernest Ikoli (elected in 1941)
Nominated African members
British Cameroons	John Manga Williams
Colony	T A Ogunbiyi
Egba	O Moore
Ibibio	G H H O'Dwyer
Ibo	E N Egbuna
Ijebu	Nathaniel Olusoga
Ondo	L A Lennon
Oyo Province	Akinpelu Obisesan
Rivers district	S B Rhodes
Nominated commercial members
Mining	H H W Boyes (Associated Tin Mines)
Kano	W T Gates
Lagos	J F. Winter (John Holt)
Port Harcourt	F Edmondson
Source: Wheare

== Aftermath ==
By-elections were held in Lagos in 1945 and 1946 to replace Jibril Martin and Ernest Ikoli (who had been elected in the 1940 and 1941 by-elections respectively) when their five-year terms expired.
