= Shafi Edu =

Nigerian businessman (1911–2002)

S. L. Edu
- Shafi Edu welcoming Prince Bernhard to Nigeria, 1987

Western Region Commissioner for Health and Social Services

Member of Federal House of Representatives

Personal details
- Born: 7 January 1911 Epe, Lagos State, Nigeria
- Died: 8 January 2002 (aged 91) Ikoyi, Lagos, Nigeria

Chief Shafi Lawal Edu (7 January 1911 – 8 January 2002), popularly known as S.L. Edu, was a Nigerian businessman, environmentalist and conservationist from Epe, Lagos State. He founded the Nigerian Conservation Fund, a non-governmental organization involved in conservation projects, and was a former member of the council of the World Wildlife Fund.

== Life ==
Shafi Lawal Edu was born on 7 January 1911 in Epe, Lagos to the polygamous family of Lawani Edu; his mother was Raliatu who was the daughter of a Muslim cleric. His education started with attendance at Quranic schools before enrolling in the Government Muslim Primary School in Epe. He finished his education in 1927 and became a teacher at his school.

Edu belonged to a royal ancestry, a scion of a Muslim family. His grandfather was Buraimoh Edu, a Muslim Mogaji who later became the Baale of Epe. Edu reigned between 1903 and 1917 and is generally regarded as the last paramount ruler of Epe. Edu was one of the young men who accompanied Oba Kosoko of Lagos into exile in Epe in the wake of British military infiltration and occupation of Lagos in 1851.

Edu died on 8 January 2002, 24 hours after he turned 91. In line with his wish, Edu remains were buried in his homeland Epe on 9 January 2002.

He held positions in Epe, Lagos State, Nigeria, and the international community. His work focused on public service.

From his early time in the rural environment of Epe, Shafi Edu travelled on his journey, making significant and ground breaking contributions to the domains of business, commerce, politics, environment, philanthropy, religion and education.

== Career ==
Edu left teaching in 1930 and started a career as a clerk with the Africa Oil and Nuts Company, a firm that had a business alliance with Holland West Africa and was involved in buying palm produce at Epe. In 1933, he was posted to Apapa as a shipping clerk with Holland West Africa. By 1945, he had risen to a managerial level. As a manager, he organized the Dutch shipping line's offices in the country and helped in expanding the business to other coastal cities. Figuring out there were affordable untapped prospects in the Nigerian shipping industry, he left Holland West Africa Lines and founded his firm. Using his prior experience in the shipping industry, he found himself a niche in ship handling and stevedoring. He later expanded the venture into timber and other commodities. In the post war period, he was a food contractor to private, government, and European agencies. He also delved into the oil haulage business working as a contractor for British Petroleum. Edu was the chairman of British Petroleum, Nigeria when the firm was nationalized and had its name changed to African Petroleum by the Obasanjo regime. In partnership with T.A. Braithwaite and Munich Re-Insurance, he set up an insurance firm, African Alliance.

In the 1950s, Edu was a member of the expatriate-dominated Lagos Chamber of Commerce, as a member, he became acquainted with the law firm of Irving and Bonnar which acted as an advisory firm to foreign businesses scouting for opportunities in the country. Through Irving and Bonnar, he secured board seats with Blackwood Hodge Nigeria, plumbing and electrical firm, Haden Nigeria, and Glaxo Nigeria. He was also a board member of the Federal Industrial Loans Board from 1954 to 1959. In 1963, he was elected president of the Lagos Chamber of Commerce. Edu's voyage on the high seas of entrepreneurship started as a ship chandelier, food contractor, and timber trader. He was successful in business. He expanded his business interest in the early 1950s to include such areas as transport which he named Slee Transport Limited. This company majored in oil haulage and transportation of petroleum products. From the 1950s to the end of the First Republic, Slee Transport Limited was a major haulage contractor for British Petroleum.

He grieved that he had to witness the contemporary deterioration in the state of Nigeria's economy, governance, and international relations. Nigeria's suspension from the Commonwealth during the General Sani Abacha tenure as military head of state was particularly bitter to him as he was actively involved in the Commonwealth Chambers of Commerce in his capacity as the Chairman of the Nigerian Chapter of the Royal Commonwealth Society for decades.

Edu was a famous statesman and politician in Nigeria. His active participation in politics began in 1945, when he was chosen to serve as a councilor for Epe District Council's Bado Ward. He was chosen to serve in the Federal House of Representatives in 1952 and did so until 1954.

=== Political career ===
During the pre-independence period, Edu was sympathetic to the Nigerian Youth Movement (NYM) as a supporter of Jibril Martin, one of the party's candidates in the 1943 election. He was elected into the Western House of Assembly in 1951 and was later nominated to represent Epe, he focused his energy on various enterprises. He founded Nigerian Conservation Foundation in 1980. One of his sons, Yomi Edu, was appointed Minister of Special Duties, by Olusegun Obasanjo.

Edu was elected a councillor to represent Bado ward in the Epe district council in 1945 and between 1952 till 1954 he served as a member of the House of Representatives in the present-day Lagos State of Nigeria.

Chief S.L Edu Research Grant

The Nigerian Conservation Foundation (NCF) in partnership with Chevron Nigeria Limited (CNL) offers research grants to Nigerian citizens who wish to undertake research work in fields related to nature conservation and sustainable livelihood. The grant is for PhD programs.
