= 1945 Lagos by-election =

A by-election was held for the Lagos seat in the Legislative Council of Nigeria in December 1945 to replace Jibril Martin of the Nigerian Youth Movement (NYM). It was won by Abubakar Olorun-Nimbe of the Nigerian National Democratic Party (NNDP).

== Campaign ==
The NNDP and the Nigerian Union of Young Democrats put forward Olorun-Nimbe, vice president of the NNDP, as a joint candidate. A doctor, he had studied medicine at the University of Glasgow and ran a private practice in Lagos. He was well known in the town due to his role as a member of Lagos Town Council. His opponent was Oluwole Ayodele Alakija of the NYM. Alakija was a barrister who had studied at Jesus College, Oxford and was vice-president of the party's Port Harcourt branch.

Despite the NYM's success in the 1938 general elections, when it had won all three seats in Lagos, its popularity in the town had diminished, partly due to the internal splits caused by the row over the party's candidate for the 1941 by-election. Separately, the alliance of the NNDP with the new National Council of Nigeria and the Cameroons had restored some of its credibility.

The West African Pilot called on voters to vote for a "seriously active Moslem", noting the fact that Olorun-Nimbe had twice been to Mecca and that he was a "practical politician with experience". Despite not being a Muslim, Alakija was supported by Chief Imam Y. P. O. Shodeinde.

== Results ==
Candidate	Party	Votes	%
Abubakar Olorun-Nimbe	Nigerian National Democratic Party	784	67.64
Oluwole Ayodele Alakija	Nigerian Youth Movement	375	32.36
Total		1,159	100.00
Registered voters/turnout		1,430	–
Source: Tamuno
