= G. B. A. Coker =

Judge of the Nigerian Supreme Court and high chief (1917–1991)

Chief G. B. A Coker
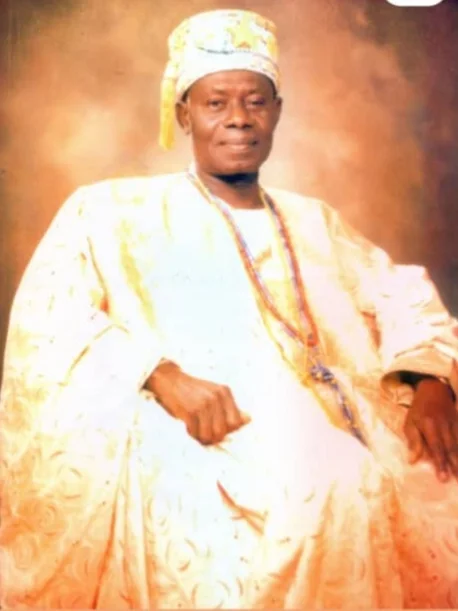
- Born: January 27, 1917; Lagos, Colony and Protectorate of Nigeria
- Died: February 7, 1991 (aged 74); Lagos, Nigeria

Chief George Baptist Ayodola Coker (27 January 1917 – 7 February 1991) was a Justice of the Nigerian Supreme Court, serving from 1964 until 1975. He was an author of two books: Family Property among the Yorubas, and a lecture series, Freedom and Justice.

He was the Olori Eyo of the Adimu Orisha, the highest position in the Eyo cultural masquerade in the Nigerian chieftaincy system, and in 2000 there was an Eyo festival celebrating his life. He was also the Baba Isale of Lagos.

== Background ==
A member of the Coker family, who are one of Nigeria's most aristocratic families and who are influential in business and politics, Chief Coker was for many years their leader. An affluent district in Lagos, Coker, is named after his family. Other notable members include F. C. O. Coker, a chartered accountant, the first president of the Institute of Chartered Accountants of Nigeria, former Lagos Municipal Treasurer and secretary to the first Lagos state government.

== Life ==
A Saro, Coker was born in Lagos as the son of George Baptist Coker. He was a great-great-grandchild of Daniel Coker, a freed slave who emigrated to Sierra Leone and was a key figure in the creation of the African Methodist Episcopal Church (AME) in 1816, which became the first independent black denomination in the United States. When Coker arrived in Sierra Leone in 1820, he became the first Methodist missionary from a Western nation. There, Coker founded the West Africa Methodist Church. His father George Baptist Coker, was a baker and an auctioneer and was the first Asiwaju of Lagos.

Chief Coker was educated at Olowogbowo Wesleyan Primary School, Lagos from 1924 to 1928 and he then attended Methodist Boys' High School, Lagos from 1929 to 1931, he finished his secondary education as one of the foundational students of Igbobi College. Thereafter, he worked briefly as a civil servant and later as a teacher. He later proceeded to London to earn a law degree and was called to the bar in 1947. He obtained a Ph.D. in law in 1955. Coker had a lucrative law practice in Lagos before he was appointed to the bench of the High Court of Lagos in 1958.

In 1962, during a political crisis in the Western region of Nigeria, Coker was appointed by Moses Majekodunmi, the sole administrator of the region, to chair a commission of enquiry into the affairs of some statutory corporations. The commission was viewed by some as an instrument to discredit the Awolowo faction of the Action Group. However, in the final report of the enquiry, it found Awolowo culpable in the diversion of regional funds to finance the Action Group, but exonerated Akintola, which made it easier for the latter to be reinstated as Premier of the region. This became known as the Coker Commission Of Inquiry.

The Coker Commission Of Inquiry issued a four-volume report detailing administrative excesses in the region. It reported misuse of public funds for private and political gain. This was not the case in the other two regions of North and East. The Governor of Northern Region Kashim Ibrahim died a poor man, and M.I Okpara, Premier of Eastern Region, despite all the industries he built could not build a single house for himself; but across the Niger, the Premier of Western Region, Awo, was already a millionaire in foreign currency. Money meant for government projects was diverted into private businesses such as news media (Tribune Newspapers), real estate, hotel management, and other business concerns of the Yoruba Leader.

The Commissioners stated further that Awolowo’s scheme "was to build around him with money an empire financially formidable both in Nigeria and abroad-an empire in which dominance would be maintained by him by the power of the money which he had given out." September 22, 1962 - Awolowo was placed under house arrest due to the findings of the independent commission of inquiry.

Coker became a justice of the Nigerian Supreme Court in 1964. At the Court, Coker was notable for his judgements in stay of execution pending judgement cases. Two notable cases of the nature were Vaswani v Savalakh and Utilgas Nigerian And Overseas Gas Co. Ltd.v. Pan African Bank Ltd.

Coker was a member of the Methodist Church in Tinubu, Lagos.
