= Egbe Omo Oduduwa =

Nigerian political organisation

Egbé Ọmọ Odùduwà (English: Yoruba National Movement) is a Nigerian political organisation established in 1945 by Yoruba leaders in London. Its initial purpose was to unite the Yoruba people in a manner similar to the tenets of the Ibibio State Union and the Igbo Federal Union. The organisation grew in popularity from 1948 to 1951. In 1951, Egbé Ọmọ Odùduwà supported the formation of the Nigerian Political Party Action Group.

== History ==
=== Foundation ===
Egbé Ọmọ Odùduwà was established in 1945 by Adeyemo Alakija as President, Yekini Ojikutu as Vice President, Obafemi Awolowo as General Secretary, Akinola Maja, Oni Akerele, Akintola Williams, Saburi Biobaku, Dr. J. Akanni Doherty, Abiodun Akinrele, D.O.A. Oguntoye, Ayo Rosiji and others in London, England. Their stated aim in setting up the organisation was to unite the Yorùbá people in a manner similar to the tenets of the Ibibio State Union and the Ibo Federal Union; which were political action committees of the Ibibio people and the Igbo people respectively.

=== Expansion ===
The Egbé Ọmọ Odùduwà grew in importance in 1948 when it was launched in Lagos with great fanfare by prominent Yoruba politicians associated with the Nigerian Youth Movement. These politicians included Chief Bode Thomas, Chief H. O. Davies, Sir Kofo Abayomi, Chief Akintola Williams, Dr. Akinola Maja and others. The revival of the Egbé Ọmọ Odùduwà in 1948 was not accidental, because that was the year heated debates were being held to decide Nigeria's political orientation; nationalism or parochialism. During this period of the struggle for independence from the British, radical nationalism had been in the ascendancy since 1938, but it became very pronounced between 1945 and 1948. This period was marked by the General Strike of 1945 and the 1946 Nigeria-wide NCNC campaign against the imposition of the Richards Constitution.

Yoruba politicians in Lagos led by Chief Bode Thomas formed the group in response to the afore-mentioned ethnically specific organisations, and also to chart a specific course for the development of Nigeria's Western Region, populated overwhelmingly by the Yorubas. On March 21, 1951, the Egbé Ọmọ Odùduwà set up a political party called the Action Group. The party was to serve as the vehicle for realising its primary objective of mobilising the Yoruba under one political umbrella. The Action Group was therefore formed to implement the ideals and objectives of the Egbé Ọmọ Odùduwà; and was led by Chief Obafemi Awolowo.

=== Relaunch ===
The Egbé Ọmọ Odùduwà was relaunched a number of years after the first Egbé Ọmọ Odùduwà.

Other organisations within Egbe Omo Oduduwa are the Oduduwa Economic Agency (OEA), the Oduduwa Education Foundation (OEF), and the Oduduwa Development Agency (ODA).
