= 1938 Nigerian general election =

General elections were held in Nigeria on 21 October 1938. The Nigerian Youth Movement (NYM) won three of the four elected seats in the Legislative Council, defeating the Nigerian National Democratic Party (NNDP), which had won every election since 1923.

== Electoral system ==
The 1922 Nigeria (Legislative Council) Order in Council provided for a 46-member Legislative Council, of which 23 were ex-officio officials, four were nominated officials, up to 15 were appointed unofficial members and four were elected (three in Lagos and one in Calabar). The 23 ex officio officials included the Governor, the Chief Secretary and their deputy, the Lieutenant Governors and secretaries of the Northern and Southern Provinces, the Attorney General, the Commandant of the Nigerian Regiment, the Director of Medical Services, the Treasurer, the Director of Marine, the Comptroller of Customs, the Secretary of Native Affairs, together with ten senior residents.

The franchise was restricted to men aged 21 or over who were British subjects or a native of Nigeria who had lived in their municipal area for the 12 months prior to the election, and who earned at least £100 in the previous calendar year. The right to vote was withheld from those who had been convicted of a crime and sentenced to death, hard labour or prison for more than a year, or were of "unsound mind". Only 908 people registered to vote in Lagos out of a population of over 126,000, whilst just 107 registered in Calabar (the population of the town was 16,653 according to the 1931 census).

All eligible voters could also run as candidates unless they had an undischarged bankruptcy, had received charitable relief in the previous five years or were a public servant. Candidates were required to obtain the nomination of at least three registered voters and pay a £10 deposit. The term of the council was five years.

== Campaign ==
Six candidates contested the three Lagos seats, three from the NNDP and three from the NYM. Two of the NNDP candidates (Crispin Adeniyi-Jones and Eric Moore) were sitting Council members, whilst Ayo Williams ran as a joined NNDP and Nigerian Union of Young Democrats candidate, replacing former NNDP legislator T. A. Doherty. The NYM nominated Kofo Abayomi, Olayinka Alakija and H. S. A. Thomas.

In Calabar the independent Okon Efiong was the only candidate, and was elected unopposed.

== Results ==
Party	Votes	%	Seats	+/–
Nigerian Youth Movement	1,506	64.83	3	New
Nigerian National Democratic Party	817	35.17	0	–3
Independents			1	+1
Total	2,323	100.00	4	0
Registered voters/turnout	908	–		
Source: Tamuno

=== By constituency ===
Lagos (three members)
Candidate	Party	Votes	%
H.S.A. Thomas	Nigerian Youth Movement	520	22.38
Kofo Abayomi	Nigerian Youth Movement	514	22.13
Olayinka Alakija	Nigerian Youth Movement	472	20.32
Crispin Adeniyi-Jones	Nigerian National Democratic Party	306	13.17
Eric Moore	Nigerian National Democratic Party	272	11.71
Ayo Williams	Nigerian National Democratic Party	239	10.29
Total		2,323	100.00
Valid votes		2,323	100.00
Invalid/blank votes		0	0.00
Total votes		2,323	100.00
Registered voters/turnout		908	255.84
Source: Tamuno

=== List of members ===
Governor Bernard Bourdillon appointed 15 unofficial members to the Legislative Council, of which seven were Europeans and eight Africans (an increase from seven Africans in the 1933 elections). The seven Europeans represented commercial interests, with three representing the banking, mining and shipping sectors, and four representing commercial interests of Calabar, Kano, Lagos and Port Harcourt. The eight Africans represented the Colony of Lagos, Ijebu, Oyo Province, Rivers district, the Egba, Ibibio and the Ibo, as well as one seat representing the cities of Benin and Warri. The Ijebu and Ibibio seats were new, whilst the African Traders seat had been discontinued; its former representative B O E Amobi became the new appointed member for the Ibo, after being nominated by the Onitsha Native Authority. The Ibibio representative Nyong Essien was nominated by the Ibibio League, which was affiliated with the NYM.

Three of the seven European appointed members were new; W V Wootton as the Calabar representative, D D Gibb as the banking representative and H H W Boyes as the mining representative. The only new African members were Nyong Essien and Nathaniel Olusoga, who represented the new seats.

Constituency	Member
Elected members
Calabar	Okon Efiong
Lagos	H.S.A. Thomas
Lagos	Kofo Abayomi
Lagos	Olayinka Alakija
Nominated African members
Benin & Warri	A Egbe
Colony	Henry Rawlingson Carr
Egba	Adeyemo Alakija
Ibibio	Nyong Essien
Ibo	B.O.E. Amobi
Ijebu	Nathaniel Olusoga
Oyo Province	N.D. Oyerinde
Rivers district	S.B. Rhodes
Nominated commercial members
Banking	D.D. Gibb (British Bank of West Africa)
Mining	H.H.W. Boyes (Associated Tin Mines)
Shipping	H.S. Feggetter
Calabar	W.V. Wootton (John Holt & Co)
Kano	W.T. Ogden
Lagos	R.M. Williams (United Africa Company)
Port Harcourt	P.H. Davey
Source: Wheare

== Aftermath ==
The next full Legislative Council elections were not held until 1947 due to World War II. By-elections were held to replace members in 1940 and 1941, before partial elections were held in 1943. Two additional African members were appointed in 1942 representing Ondo (M C Adeniyi) and British Cameroons (J M Williams).
