= James Churchill Vaughan =

James Churchill Vaughan Jr.
- Born: James Churchill Omosanya Vaughan Jr. 30 May 1893; Lagos, Nigeria
- Died: 1937 (aged 43–44); Lagos, Nigeria
- Education: MB, ChB (1918)
- Alma mater: University of Glasgow
- Occupation: Medical Doctor
- Known for: Political activism

James Churchill Omosanya Vaughan Jr., M.D. (30 May 1893 – 1937) was a Nigerian doctor and a prominent political activist.

== Birth and education ==
Vaughan was born in Lagos on 30 May 1893, the son of James Wilson Vaughan, who descended from the 19th century American artisan Scipio Vaughan and through whom he also had Catawba ancestry. His father was a prosperous Lagos Yoruba merchant. He was among the first set of scholars at King's College, Lagos when it was founded in 1909. Vaughan and Isaac Ladipo Oluwole were the two first Nigerian students at the University of Glasgow, studying medicine there from 1913 to 1918, when they graduated with medical degrees. The two students were subject to racial prejudice. In the program for the final dinner in 1918, Vaughan was given an epithet after Robert Burns's "The Twa Dogs", likening him to a foreign born dog, "whalpit some place far abroad".

== Career ==
Returning to Nigeria in the early 1920s, Vaughan set up a private clinic. He also provided free medical services for the destitute. Vaughan attempted with little success to collate the works of the pioneering Nigerian doctor Oguntola Sapara, who had taken a special interest in traditional herbal medicines, but had left only fragmentary records of his researches.

Vaughan became an outspoken critic of the British Colonial Administration, and in 1934 was one of the founders of the Lagos Youth Movement along with other leading activists including Dr Kofo Abayomi, Hezekiah Oladipo Davies, Ernest Sissei Ikoli, and Samuel Akinsanya. Vaughan was the first president of the movement. The Lagos Youth Movement originally had improvement of higher education as its goal, but within four years had become the most influential nationalist organization in the country. It was renamed the Nigerian Youth Movement in 1936 to emphasize its pan-Nigerian objectives. One of the early issues was the curriculum of medical teaching at the Yaba Higher College.
