= 1940 Lagos by-election =

A by-election was held for the Lagos seat in the Legislative Council of Nigeria in 1940. It followed the death of incumbent Olayinka Alakija, who had been a member of the Nigerian Youth Movement (NYM). Jibril Martin of the NYM was elected with 64% of the vote.

== Campaign ==
Martin and Samuel Akisanya both sought the NYM nomination, with Martin chosen as the party's candidate. His opponent was Crispin Adeniyi-Jones, a doctor who had been a member of the Legislative Council from 1923 until losing his seat in the 1938 elections.

== Results ==
Candidate	Party	Votes	%
Jibril Martin	Nigerian Youth Movement	505	64.41
Crispin Adeniyi-Jones	Nigerian National Democratic Party	279	35.59
Total		784	100.00
Source: Tamuno
