= Nyong Essien =

Nigerian politician

Nyong Essien Akpan Efio-Iwat Effembe Ebit Akpan Amaide Oku (9 November 1872 – 15 October 1976) was a traditional ruler, teacher, and retired civil servant in Nigeria.

He was the first representative of Old Calabar Province in the Legislative Council in Lagos and the first president of the Eastern Regional House of Chiefs in Nigeria's Eastern Region. He was also the first installed president of the Ibibio Union, the first officially recognized paramount ruler of Uyo, and the first nsom of Uruan.

Chief Nyong Essien was one of the pillars of Nigerian nationalism. He was one of the prime architects and negotiators of Nigeria's independence. He intellectually fought for the enhancement of the traditional institutions of his people, and he was known for his opposition to corruption.

== Early life and education ==
Chief Nyong Essien was born on 9 November 1872, into the royal family of Akpan Efiom-Iwat, Effembe Ebit Akpan Amaide Oku in Issiet Ekim village, Southern Uruan in the then Uruan clan of Uyo Division, Calabar Province of Eastern Region, Nigeria. His late father, Obong Essien Akpan Effiom-Iwat was a well known aristocrat and the village head of Issiet Ekim. Chief Nyong Essien was admitted into Duke Town School owned by the Church of Scotland Mission in 1900 at the age of 28. He passed all the infant classes the same year. He was in Standard IV in 1904 and the school set a general examination for the entire school (Standard I to IV). His exceptional success in the exams earned him the position of a senior prefect for the entire school. This feat earned him the prestigious award of DUX and his name was engraved on the brass honour roll of the School as No. 1. This evidence is still available today on the walls of class room No. 10 in Duke Town Primary School, Calabar, Cross River State.

== Career ==
=== Teaching and missionary career ===
After the completion of Standard IV in 1906 at the Duke Town Primary school, Calabar. He attained the highest level of education available at the time in Calabar Province. His Head Master, Mr. S. M. Hart noted that "he was a hard worker and a keen patriot, who had sincere love for the progress of his country, his race and for humanity" The man, Nyong Essien, was employed as a teacher in Duke Town Primary School and he taught for two years before resigning and taking up the Missionary work with the Methodist Mission, which was at that time known as the "Primitive Methodist". He pioneered the Missionary work to his home town, Issiet Ekim, where founded the Issiet Ekim Methodist Church in 1909 and caused his people to hand over the Presbyterian School in his village for the ""Primitive Methodist" to manage. He eventually took up appointment as a teacher in the Methodist Missionary Mission. Operating from his village, he carried the touch of Western education and Christianity into the interior areas for the benefit of the Ibibio People and beyond. In 1911 he was transferred to Oron Institute where he worked in dual capacity as a Mission Agent and as An Assistant Teacher under Rev. T. W. Hancox, Manager and Principal of the school. Thereafter, he was transferred to work in out stations of the Primitive Methodist Mission both as a school teacher and a station preacher until 1916 where he withdrew his services from the Methodist Mission. According to the Methodist Mission record, Chief Nyong Essien "has always been industrious and striven hard to improve himself. The only trouble he has had with the Mission has been the tendency of his opinions towards the practices of the African Church. His actual entry into that church is the reason for his separation from the mission work." However the real reason was that they have asked Chief Nyong Essien to take up orders as a Methodist Minister in 1911, an offer which he rejected. His love for books resulted in the creation of the Shekina library, one of the best private libraries in the eastern part of Nigeria. The library was donated to the University of Uyo as Nyong Essien Collection in Nyong Essien Library, town campus, University of Uyo, Nigeria.

=== Civil service career ===
Between January 1917 and December 1918, Chief Nyong Essien served as a clerk for Barrister J. W. Maxwell at Calabar, when Mr. Maxwell left Calabar to Europe. He was appointed into the Clerical Cadre of the colonial civil service in 1919 and served in dual capacity as a Correspondence Clerk and an Interpreter in the Supreme Court of Nigeria, Judicial Department, Calabar. While serving at the Calabar station, Chief Nyong Essien was described as än Excellent Interpreter" by His Honour, Sir Arthur Frederick Clarence Weber, whom he worked under. He was transferred to the Judicial Department in Lagos aftwhere he served under Justice Herbert Norman Cleverly and Philip Peter-Rides until he retired from in August 1929 on medical grounds. He served for 11 years in the Colonial Civil service and was only promoted to the rank of second Class Clerk. 1918;. He was a union activist and a pioneer member of the Nigerian Civil Service Union. He became secretary of the union when the Union stood up against the existence of disparity between the African and European civil servants in the colonial service. In January 1939, he collected a cheque for the sum of 134 pounds for his pension and gratuity.

== Establishment of the Ibibio Union and the Calabar Rights and Liberties Protection Union ==
Chief Nyong Essien was the organizer and first President General of the Ibibio Mainlanders Association which was established in Calabar in 1924. The association started as a social, friendly, humanitarian, charitable, educational, industrial, and constructive society. Its name "Mainland Association" was significant in the fact that its membership included all Ibibio people resident in Calabar. He remained as the leader of the Association up to 1928 ·when it merged with another group known as Ibibio Welfare Association which existed in the Mainland part of the then Calabar Province, now Akwa Ibom State to become Ibibio Union. (In 1948 it was re-named Ibibio State Union). It is significant to note that the Ibibio State Union evolved to become one of the leading ethnic organizations in Nigeria and embarked on many impressive programmes before its proscription in 1966 by the Aguyi Ironsi's military administration.13 He also served as the Secretary of the Calabar National League from 1920 to 1923. He was the President of the Legal Servants and Aspirants Association of Calabar, which Dr. Nnamdi Azikiwe was the founder, organizer and Secretary in 1925.

The Calabar Rights and Liberties Protection Union, which Nyong Essien was the Secretary, was a social and political organization. Its membership was opened to any tax payer in Old Calabar. The main aim of the Union was to protect the rights and liberties of the inhabitants of Calabar in particular and the rights of other people in general. The Union also hoped to establish national schools for the promotion of the people's culture apart from enhancing unity and co-operation for better life in Calabar community.·

The Union strove to work in the spirit of what were embodied in the Agreements, Treaties and Conventions entered into by the Kings of Calabar and the Government of Great Britain or its agents between 6 December 1841 and 21 November 1922. The treaty of 1842 outlawed the sale and export of slaves and promised to pay compensation to King Eyamba, yearly for five years for the loss in slave trade. The treaty of 1849 abolished human sacrifices, slave trading and the killing of twin children and their mothers as well as the use of esere beans or poison nut. The agreement of 1878 confirmed the previous treaties signed between 1850 and 1872 by the Calabar Kings and the British Government. It rendered the native customs of forcing widows to remain in filth and wretchedness in their houses for seven years after the death of their husbands and the tradition of assaulting helpless women in the public void.

The Calabar People's Rights and Liberties Protection Union in exercising its mandate, also made reference to the Agreement of April 1889, signed by the King of Calabar with Her Majesty's Special Commission, Major Claude Macdonald and Consul Edward Ryde Hewett, which allowed collection of taxes from the African and white residents and the use of the tax money to erect public buildings in Calabar. It guaranteed justice for all residents and preserved native laws and customs which did not permit cruelties, oppression, injustice and slavery.

Chief Nyong Essien in his advocacy for the implementation of the agreements observed that it had laid down the principles of good government in Calabar. His Union placed a very great reliance on Article XII, Sections l and 2 of the Order-in-Council of 1922, relating to the Colonial Government of Nigeria, which maintained that "rights" given to the natives in the Protectorate by Treaties or Agreements made and sanctioned by Her Majesty, Queen Victoria or Her Agent, remained effective.

The Union pressed for a meeting with the Resident and at the meeting, Chief Nyong Essien who was the Secretary, on behalf of the Union outlined their grievances, notably the denial of non-Efik in Calabar the right of representation in the Obio Efik Council and the Native Court. (The non-Efik included, Ibibio, Igbo, Yoruba, Hausa, Sierra Leonians and West Indians). Chief Nyong Essien requested that the administration of Calabar should be a centre-piece of good government to others vis-a-vis, justice to all, irrespective of place of origin. He also requested that the name of "Obio Efik Council" be changed to "Calabar Council", which should carter for all tax payers resident in Calabar. These contributions which facilitated some reforms in the colonial administration earned him the admiration of the people.

Chief Nyong Essien also used the Calabar People's Rights and Liberties Protection Union to work for the establishment of a separate Native Administration Council and Court for Akpabuyo, despite the opposition by the "Obio Efik Council" which maintained that the majority of Akpabuyo people were not free-borns, therefore, their political destiny under the Native Administration system was to be controlled by the Etuboms, who were family heads of Akpabuyo villages. His efforts caused the Colonial Government in Calabar, under the leadership of Mr. G H. Finlay and Major Sealy-King, the Divisional Officer, to reform the Obio Efik Council and liberate the Efik, Efut and Qua. Moreover, the name of the Council was changed to that of "Calabar Native Administration Council" and the political discrimination against those regarded by the Efik as "ex-slaves" or "non-free-borns" was officially abrogated and the stigma removed. This resulted in both the Efik and other tax payers resident in Calabar being given rights and representation in the Calabar Council.

Chief Nyong Essien was elected as a member of the Reformed Calabar Native Administration Council in June, 1934 and was made a member of the Executive Committee of the Council which held its first meeting on 6 July 1934. The Committee ended its term in December of the same year. In September, 1934, he was also selected by Duke House to sit as a member at the Calabar Native Administration Court. Again, Duke House selected him as a member of the Calabar Native Administration Court for the month of August, 1936 and in April 1937; he was elected as a member of the Council. In addition, Chief Nyong Essien was the initiator of the Efik Cooperative Society.

In the 1920s, the Colonial Government introduced the "Forests Development Management Policy" in Nigeria. The policy was influenced by the belief that forests could yield raw materials like timber needed for building and construction work; and that forest could maintain natural soil fertility as a source of all agricultural wealth. As pointed out by the then Director of Forest1y, M. H. N. Thompson in 1930, it was anticipated that within a period of 25 years · (from 1930), much of the woodland in Nigeria would be destroyed by shifting cultivation or fire. Therefore, in a bid to check the supposed menace of forest destruction in Nigeria, the Colonial government adopted measures to conserve and manage the existing forests for purposes of checking soil erosion and maintaining continuous supply of timber and other forests products.

For this reason, the Colonial Government wanted to establish a Forest Reserve in the mangrove swamp areas of Calabar, Qua, Efut, Uruan, Oron and Efiat lands, without consulting with the owners of the swamps concerned, the people sought the services of Chief Nyong Essien to oppose the move. He, as usual rose to the occasion, presented a protest to the Lieutenant Governor of the Southern Provinces, Mr. W. E. Hunt and rejected the government's irregular and unconstitutional method on the issue. The people's protest through him influenced the government's issuance of a counter statement cancelling the earlier memorandum which declared mangrove swamps as "Forest Reserve" and abrogated the Calabar Mangrove forest Declaration Order. This made the members of the Calabar Native Administration Council to pass a resolution commending him for his patriotic act.

During the trade depression of the 1930's which came as a result of the commercial middlemen who blocked the attempt of local farmers and traders from selling their products directly to overseas traders, people in the Calabar Province faced serious financial challenges because of the substantial reduction in profits made by the local framers and traders. To reverse the situation, Chief Nyong Essien organized local farmers and traders in Calabar and formed a union known as the 'Eastern· Provinces Trade Depression Association". By 1934, many branches of the Association were opened in several districts of the former Calabar Province with him serving as the Secretary-General.

With the formation of this organization, Chief Nyong Essien advocated for the direct export of the "native produce" to America instead of Britain. It was decided that a minimum of 2,000 tons of palm oil would be shipped monthly and other products were to be sent in proportion. The Association collaborated with one Prince Eket Inyang Udo of Ikot Ataku, Eket District and agreed to pay Prince Inyang Udo one per cent of total gross business in return for his services. The venture failed because the British administration which was alarmed by the development put some policies in place to thwart the project.

Apart from the political contributions he rendered outside his place of birth, Chief Nyong Essien also served in the 1930s as a member of Uruan Colonial Native Administration Executive Council and on many occasions, he was a member of the Executive Committee of the Council. He also served as President of the Court Idu Uruan and later at Nnung Ikono Ufok.

== Nyong Essien as the representative of the Ibibio Colonial Districts in the Legislative Council, Lagos ==
In 1936 the Ibibio leaders made a strong representation to the Chief Commissioner of the Eastern Provinces Mr. G.G. Shute concerning the non-representation of the Ibibio in the Legislative Council in Lagos. As a result of the request, they were granted a seat in the Legislative Council. Consequently, Chief Nyong Essien was nominated by the Ibibio Union to represent the six Ibibio Colonial Districts (present day Akwa Ibom State). In 1938, the Colonial Government approved the recommendation and nominated Chief Nyong Essien as an un-official member and the Representative of the Six Ibibio Districts in the Legislative Council. The Colonial Government's approval was published in the Government Gazette. As the first representative of an etqno-cultural group in the Nigerian legislature, Chief Nyong Essien's contributions to the debates in the Legislative Council became mercurial and path-breaking and ostensibly fruitful. He was regarded as a dare devil critic of the colonial structure and was acclaimed an outstanding forensic orator whose persuasive eloquence and dignified presence could not be ignored. He served for two terms in the Legislative Council, between 1938 and 1943.

Due to the fact that the Colonial Government made no significant improvement in running Native Administration, Chief Nyong Essien re-opened a debate on the Indirect Rule System in the Legislative Council. In his view, the system of indirect rule was supposed to be founded on the principles of independent government and thus, its ultimate goal was independence, He argued that the Colonial Native Authority was in the hands of illiterates who were majority in most of the Native Administrations. He expressed his dissatisfaction in the way the Native Administration System was organized. Since he regarded illiteracy as a "canker-worm", he therefore urged the Colonial Government to improve the Native Administration System by developing Nigerian schools to train and educate the staff in the art of governance. He also called on the Colonial Government to encourage educated men and women to develop interest in the Native Administration System by becoming members of the Executive Committee of the Councils. In addition, he viewed the system as being an alien institution to Nigerians in terms of its operations and therefore, urged that the Native Administration System in all sections of the country should be re-organized as it was done in Calabar, through the help of the Calabar People's Rights Liberties Protection Union (when he served as the Secretary General).

Chief Nyong Essien 's propositions for the reform of the Native Administration through educational training was not welcomed by the Colonial Government; but some years later, the government adopted definite steps to improve the system. The Government later developed training programmes for the Native Administration personnel and made constitutional changes aimed at preparing Nigerians for the attainment of internal self-government in the defunct Nigerian Regions. Chief Nyong Essien also distinguished himself in the Legislative Council as "an Apostle of Education". He expressed deep concern about the inadequate standard of education among Nigerians in the early 1940s and the fact that the Colonial Government was playing a minimal role in developing education in Nigeria. He urged the government to send Inspectors of Education to inspect the private schools to determine if they meet the necessary requirements to qualify for government assistance. He also lamented the exclusion of non-denominational. schools· in the grant-in-aid scheme. He explained that there were private schools established by some individuals as well as those owned by the African Missions which the Colonial Government denied grants-in-aid.

As a result of Chief Nyong Essien's insistence, some non-mission schools such as Henshaw Town School Calabar and Aggrey Memorial School, Arochukwu, got government grants. Further inquiry by Chief Nyong Essien on the subject matter of education revealed the fact concerning the staffing of the Qua Iboe Mission Secondary School, Etinan and the disparity in emolument between the African and European staff. It was noted that Mr. R. J. Taylor, the European principal of the institution, who registered under the National Board of Ireland, earned the sum of £200 to £350 per annum, including allowances and passages, Mr. M. G. Clarke, a British teacher, who served in the 1930s as the vice-principal of the institute was on salary of £250 per annum in addition to some allowances and passages. From this scenario, Chief Nyong Essien discovered that the African masters in the institution who had similar educational qualifications with their European counterparts were paid less salaries with little or no allowances. He then urged that since the African and European school masters in the institution had equal educational qualifications, and performed equal work, both should receive equal remuneration. He was also concerned about the general welfare of teachers. In colonial Nigeria, teachers who served under Voluntary Agency Schools often received less generous treatment than teachers and other workers in the colonial public service. For instance, the Cost of Living Allowance (COLA) were paid to teachers who worked in the Government and Native Administration (N.A.) Schools, while teachers in the Voluntary Agency Schools were not paid. Again: teachers who earned up to £128 per annum received bonus, while others who received £20 per annum got nothing. Also, an uncertified teacher in a Voluntary Agency service had to work for several years before he could earn from £30 to £72 per annum, while his counterpart in the Public Service was placed on a salary of £84 up to a · maximum of £200 per annum·. Only some certified teachers in Voluntary Agency schools, who served up to 25 years, received about £240 per annum.

Chief Nyong Essien held the strong opinion that the discriminatory treatment could result in making the teaching profession unattractive and uninteresting and could drive youth with ability to other professions. He made useful suggestions in the Legislative Council on how to improve the conditions of se1vice for teachers, both in the Colonial Government and in the Voluntary Agencies Services. He drew the attention of the Council to the importance of teachers as social factors and leaders in their respective communities. He reminded the government that the co-operation and leadership of teachers were needed in social services including Public Health, Native Administration, Spiritual Duties, Adult Education and General Improvement Schemes.

He never relented his effort in championing the cause of qualitative education and freedom for Nigerian people. For instance, when the colonial government re-considered its earlier enactment prohibiting the importation of certain books into Nigeria, Chief Nyong Essien raised a strong debate on the matter in the Legislative Council. He stated that the law was destroying what the Colonial Government itself had been laboring to build. He insisted that, any law, which tended to retard Nigeria's educational progress and advancement, should be repealed. He urged the Council to amend any laws which could no longer stand the test of the time and make room · for new and progressive laws.

He described the Order in-Council of 10 May 1941, which prohibited the importation of certain books as an attempt to suppress the liberty of the Nigerian people and called on the Government to lift the prohibition. He believed that if people in other countries in the Empire benefited from the truths taught from the books, there was no reason why Nigerians would be spoiled by reading the books. Rather he felt that Nigerians should draw some benefits from the books to enhance their knowledge. His strong advocacy received the support of many un-official members in the Legislative Council and the government was convinced to repeal the law.

He strongly called on the establishment of Government Schools in the Six Ibibio Colonial Districts (now Akwa Ibom State). He also raised a question in the Legislative Council for the attachment of an extra Department in the Elementary Training Centre at Uyo. The answer to his question was an attachment of the Industrial Department to the Uyo Elementaiy Training Centre which was later changed to Advanced Teacher's Training School. It is this centre that later constituted the College of Education and now the University of Uyo. He was appointed the first Honourable Un-Official Member of the Legislative Council to visit the Yaba Higher College (now Yaba College of Technology). He successfully presented to the government the need for re-organization and proper management of the school. He also called for equitable treatment to be given to the professionals in Medicine and Agriculture in that College and make them to be of the same status as their counterparts in the Colonial Civil Service. The issue of African tutors in the college being paid relatively lower salary than their European counterpart with the same qualification was debated in the Legislative Council. Chief Nyong Essien took the floor of the House and pressed on the Director of Education to justify the dichotomy between Africans and European tutors of the college. The Director could not justify this; his answer to the Honourable Nyong Essien's question on the issue was simple, sharp and clear "reply not ready". Apart from issues that related to education, Chief Nyong Essien1 s legislative contributions also traversed other areas of national interests. As a member of the Legislative Council, Chief Nyong Essien opposed a bill which proposed the enactments against "illicit" distillation. He described the distillation of local gin by Nigerians as a lucrative venture which could bring greater economic benefits to Nigerians and the government He requested that licenses be granted to the people who engage in the business, noting that such act could open a new field of industry to the local gin distillers and the nation at large. Beyond the economic perspective, he also viewed the matter from the perspective of government action undermining the rights of the people. Like most of his bills, the argument against the ban on local gin attracted the support of the majority of the members of the Legislative Council. However, since the Colonial Government was bent on passing the bill, probably, to encourage and protect the importation of British gin into Nigeria, the bill against the distillation of local gin was passed into law but the law was later repealed after independence, thus, Chief Nyong Essien's stance was vindicated. The passage of the Newspaper Ordinance, which required a private press to deposit the sum of £250, with the Colonial Government as a security for possible "misdemeanor" such as distortion of facts also attracted the reaction of Chief Nyong Essien in the Legislative Council. When the Member for Rivers, S. A. Rhodes, raised a motion urging the Colonial Government to amend the Newspaper Ordinance, Chief Nyong Essien gave it his full support. He argued that for the Ordinance to demand for a deposit of £250 against an anticipated crime by either the Proprietor of the Press, the Printer or the Publisher was wrong. According to him, the Colonial Government erred because the deposit was made towards payment of a fine when no crime was committed.

He compared the duty of the press to that of an advocate, a teacher, a preacher, an engineer or a governor in a state since each could provide some services according to bis capacity and office. He noted strongly that the people mentioned were human beings and therefore were liable to mistakes. He observed that since the Legislative Council did not restrict the liberty of any of them by requiring them to deposit a sum of money towards payment of a fine for a crime they did not commit, he therefore submitted that it was legally wrong to demand for such a deposit. He urged that the Nigerian press be allowed to enjoy the same liberty and freedom which the press in Britain was enjoying. He concluded by referring the Members of the Council to the opinion of Lord Erskine, a British statesman about the importance of a free press thus:

"Government, in its own estimation, has been at all times a system of perfection; but a free press has examined and detected its errors, and the people have from time reformed them. This freedom has alone made our government what it is; this freedom alone can preserve it; and therefore, under the banners of that freedom, today, I stand up to defend a free press."

He maintained that no press can be regarded as free with such imposition. At the expiration of his tenure in the Legislative Council in 1943, Chief Nyong Essien received series of commendation for his high ranking services. His Honour, G G Shute Esq. Chief Commissioner of the Eastern Province referred to Chief Nyong Essien as "the Apostle of your Education", while publicly addressing the Native Authority Councils of Ibibio Division. Also in appreciation, the press described him as "the Dare Devil".

== Political contributions from 1943 to 1959 ==
=== Opposition to The Richard Constitution ===
In 1946, the Richard's Constitution came into existence. The Constitution had provisions for a Legislative Council which would legislate for the whole of Nigeria as a single united country as well as Regional Councils for the Northern, Western and Eastern Regions. As it is well known, the initiators of the Richard's Constitution did not consult the Nigerian elites before the framing of the constitution, hence, the nationalists vigorously attacked the constitution and called for its abrogation. For instance, a nationalist like Professor Eyo Ita described it as being "the most obsolete, far out-of-date, a code of feudalism, too back-ward even for the people of the Dark Ages". He further described the different Councils created by the constitution as "tattered remnants of feudal imperialism and economic exploitation dressed up in beautiful apparels, a sanction of British imperialism of a weaker race."

However, the Richard's Constitution prevailed despite all the knocks by the nationalists. Since the constitution prevailed, some experienced Nigerians were elected into the Council created by it. Because of his experience and impressive performance in the Legislative Council, Chief Nyong Essien was elected into Eastern Regional Assembly at Enugu as one of the two members representing the Calabar Colonial Provincial Council. His unparallel performance in Enugu led to his selection to represent the Eastern Provinces as the fifth member in the Legislative Council at Lagos.

In his opening address in the first session of this term, the Governor, Lord Milver1on (then Sir Arthur Richard), paid glowing tribute to Chief Nyong Essien in the following words: "I welcome also the representatives of the Eastern Provinces of whom one has had previous experience of Legislative Council under the former constitution."

=== Political career in National Council of Nigeria and Cameroons (N. C. N. C) ===
Nyong Essien was an active member of the Nigerian Youth Movement (NYM), the first Nationalist movement in Nigeria, of which Ibibio Union was an affiliate. He was one of the 15 unofficial representatives appointed by Governor Bernard Bourdillon for the 1938 Nigerian general election. Seven of these representatives were European while eight were Africans. The Europeans represented commercial interest while the Africans represented their colonies. These colonies were Colony of Lagos, Ijebu, Oyo Province, Rivers district, the Egba, Ibibio and the Igbo, as well as one seat representing the cities of Benin and Warri. Ibibio people were represented by Nyong Essien.

Chief Nyong Essien continued his nation building engagement after the expiration of his tenure in the Legislative Council. Having established himself as a vocal parliamentarian and fierce nationalist, he became one of the most sought after pre-independence leaders by nationalist groups in the country. For instance, on 13 December 1944, Herbert Macaulay sent a passionate invitation to Obong Nyong Essien to join the National Council of Nigeria and Cameroons (N. C. N. C). In the letter sent through on Mr. D. E. F. Essienessien, Macaulay wrote thus:

Dear Chief Essien, you are far away physically and yet so near in my memory always as I gaze at your photograph daily. I am taking advantage of a relative of yours, Mr. D. F. E. Essienessien, thought here's a bright oppor1unity· to write a line or two to the sho11 political demon of the Legislative Council of Nigeria, who troubled the waters of the Council Chambers in Lagos … you must have heard that we have inaugurated a National Council of Nigeria through which we intend to approach the British government for Nigeria when victory is proclaimed against the Nazi . . . now it may be necessary to form a representative delegation to go to England and pray the Majesty, personally, if the thin gods of Nigeria refuse our request locally ... come and join the deputation.

Chief Nyong Essien quickly accepted this clarion call to duty and enlisted in the national party. He became one of the leading nationalists who toured the country in 1946 to get the people's mandate before embarking on the trip to London as planned. As it is well known, it was during the nationwide tour that Mr. Herbert Macaulay fell sick and later died. Chief Nyong Essien was saddled with the responsibility of writing the "Farewell Speech", which was delivered to Nigerians at the mass meeting before the delegation left for London. The objective of the N. C. N. C. pan-Nigerian delegation to London was to present to Sir Arthur Creech Jones, Secretary of State for Colonies, Nigeria's demand for the review of the amendment of the Richard's Constitution to accord Nigerians equality, economic security and political freedom.

On 27 June 1947, Chief Nyong Essien, "the father of the delegation" and others including: Dr. Nnamdi Azikiwe, Prince Adeleke of Ijebu Remo, Dr. Abubakar Ibiyinka Olurin-Nirnbe, Mallam Bukar Dipcharima, Chief (Mrs) Fumilayo Ransom-Kuti and Mr. Paul Kali, boarded the vessel "Almanzura" from Apapa Wharf, Lagos to Britain. In London, a memorandum containing Nigerian grievances was presented to the Secretary of State for Colonies. On 13 August 1947, Chief Nyong Essien and other delegates held a meeting with the British Secretary of State for Colonies. After the discussion, Sir Jones expressed the desire of British government to grant self-government to Nigeria in future, but noted that the Richard's Constitution could only be reviewed after it had been tried for some time. He asked the delegates to return to Nigeria and co-operate with the Colonial Government by giving it some time to try the constitution, which was already in operation. Despite the hostility received from the British press, the delegation marked an important landmark in the history of Nigeria. 44 After the meeting with the British Secretary of State for Colonies, some of the delegates including Chief Nyong Essien proceeded to Ireland. The main purpose of the visit was to strengthen the friendly relations between Nigeria and Ireland. It will be recalled that at that time, there were some Irish missionary groups working in Nigeria as well as Irish nurses in Nigerian hospitals. Moreover, Irish Universities and Colleges had served as intellectual centers for Nigerians and other African students. Thus, the visit of Nigerian delegation to that country was to demonstrate the appreciation of the African people for the contributions by the Irish Missions as well as Irish Universities and Colleges to the development of African countries like Nigeria and the Cameroon.

In Dublin, Chief Nyong Essien and other delegates were received by the Association of Students of African descent under the leadership of Mr. and Mrs. Okagbue. Soon after the student's reception, the delegates were received by the Lord Major Mr. Patrick J. Cashill at the Mission House on behalf of the citizens of Dublin. He assured the delegates of the best wishes and support of his people in the quest for independence. The Irish Press Association also received the Nigerian delegation as well as the Executive Committee of the Irish Bakers Union. On Friday morning of 12 September 1947, the Director of Programmes of the Irish Broadcasting House invited the Nigerian delegates for a recording. The delegates were accompanied by one Mr. Wachukwu, a Nigeria Barrister-at-Law, who had then graduated from Trinity College, Dublin. During the delegate's visit to the Broadcasting House, they paid high tribute to the Irish missionaries, who contributed to the development of Nigeria and the Cameroons in the fields of education and medicine. Chief Nyong Essien and other delegates were also welcome by the then Prime Minister, Mr. De Valera, at the Irish Republic Government Building. The Irish leader assured the Nigerian delegates of the friendship and goodwill of the government and nation.

=== Review of the Richards Constitution ===
On 11 March 1949, Sir John Macpherson, Governor of Nigeria proposed that a Select Committee of the Legislative Council be constituted to consider a review of the Richard's Constitution. Members of the Select Committee included all the Un-Official Members in the Legislative Council, the Financial Secretary and the Attorney-General. It was agreed that the review of the constituti, o 1 should begin from village meetings to clan meetings, to District meetings, then to Provincial Conferences, to Regional and finally to a General Conference.

Each Nigerian political Region as well as Lagos made its separate recommendation as regards the structure of the Regional and Federal governments. It was the work of the Drafting Committee to reconcile the conflicting views before the Draft was placed before the General Conference for consideration. The General Conference had 53 members, 25 of the members were non-official members in the Legislative Council who represented Lagos and the Colony, No1ihern, Western, and Eastern Provinces. At the end of the Conference, there were four minority reports, which some members of the General Conference signed.

The third Minority Report was opposed to the electoral arrangement in the Northern Region which allowed only adults of northern origin who were 25 years of age or more resident in the area for three or more years to vote. In effect, it meant that no person from Eastern or Western Region could contest an election into the Northern House of Assembly, even if he resided in the North for many years permanently. This report was signed by all delegates from the Eastern Region including Chief Nyong Essien.

Chief Nyong Essien, who had been a member of the Legislative Council during the time of Sir Richard, took active part in the various stages of the making of the new constitution during the Governorship of Sir John Macpherson. He was very vocal in defending the rights of the Chiefs or Traditional Rulers. He openly canvassed for the establishment of the House of Chiefs in all the Regions of Nigeria. Because of his contextual defense of the traditional institutions and his attack on colonialism, he was greatly admired and became a symbol of Nigerian nationalism.

The Macpherson's Constitution of 1951 and later the Lyttelton Constitution, did not last long, as crisis followed its implementation. However, with the establishment of the Eastern House of Assembly, Chief Nyong Essien was rightly made a member of the House of Assembly. The N. C. N. C. party recognized the importance of Chief Nyong Essien and the contributions that he made to the political evolution of Nigeria. The party accordingly made him the Deputy Speaker of the Eastern House of Assembly.

In nominating Chief Nyong Essien, Mr. P. G Warmate described the Chief thus:

As the most experienced Parliamentarian in the House, Chief Essien was a fitting man to fill the post. The duties of the post requires a man with a high sense of duty, integrity, impartiality, who enjoys the confidence of both sides of the House, Chief Essien qualified as such a man.

=== Nyong Essien and the Establishment of the Eastern Regional House of Chiefs ===
The non-establishment of the House of Chiefs in the Eastern Region was criticized by many. In 1955, the Government of the Eastern Region requested that a Commission of Inquiry be set up to inquire into the position and influence of chiefs and natural rulers in the Region. This led to the setting up of the famous G I. Jones Commission which was empowered to make recommendations about the appointment, recognition and deposition of chiefs in the Eastern Region.

Individuals in the Region who gave oral evidence and memorandum supported the establishment of the House of Chiefs. The natural rulers in the Eastern Region formed a non-political organization known as the "Eastern Chiefs Conference". Chief Nyong Essien was one of the important members of the Conference.

The memorandum by the Chiefs explained that, before the advent of the British administration in the area, there were natural rulers in the various villages who were in charge of administering the affairs of the respective communities. The Chiefs also strongly contended that colonialism was undermining the traditional institution in the Region. They made useful suggestions which were later adopted in structuring the Eastern House of Chiefs. Because of the excellent advocacy of the Eastern Chiefs Conference, the Eastern Region ! Government nominated Chief Essien to be paii of the Eastern delegation to the Nigerian Constitutional Conference which was held inLondonin 1957.

The London Constitutional Conference was held between 25 May, and 26 June 1957. In one of the plenary sessions which was presided over by Lord Pe1ih, Chief Nyong Essien continued his dogged fight for the recognition and establishment the House of Chiefs as second chamber of the Eastern Legislature, the Eastern House of Chiefs.

According to Udo Udoma, during the Conference, the N. C.N. C. party delegates under the leadership of Dr. Michael Okpara, as its Chief Spokesman, vehemently opposed the establishment of the House of Chiefs in the Eastern Region, despite the explanation that the Second Chamber was necessary to enable the Eastern Region be in uniformity with what was happening in the other Regions of the country. Dr. Okpara hinged his persuasive argument on the basis that from the time past, the various Igbo communities, being ultra republican in their political concept, was autonomous and never had any institution in any way approximating to chieftainship. The matter was thoroughly debated and the Eastern Chiefs Conference stance reflected the position of the United Independence Party/Calabar Ogoja-Rivers State Movement, whose leader, Sir Udo Udoma, then the President-General of the Ibibio State Union· led to the Constitutional Conference.

Eventually, the House of Chiefs was constituted for the Eastern Region. The distribution of seats as at 1959, for each of the Colonial Division were as follows: Abak 1 seat, Aba 3 seats, Afikpo 2, Abakiliki 4, Awgu 1, Ahoda2, Awka2, Brass 1, Bende 3, Calabar 1, Degema 1, Enyong 1, Eket 1, IkotEkpene2, Ikom 1, Nsukka4, Ogoja 1, Obubra 1, Obudu 1, Ogoni 1, Onitsha 4, Okigwe 3, Opobo 1, Oweni 4, Orlu 3, Port Harcourt 1, Uyo 2, Udi 3 seats. There was a representative from each of the following Colonial Provinces: Abakiliki, Yenagoa, Uyo, Annang, Port Harcourt, Calabar, Oweni, Degema, Onitsha, Enugu and Ogoja.52 When eventually, the House of Chiefs was constituted, the Governor of the Eastern Region, Dr. Francis Akanu Ibiam, on the recommendation of the Premier, Dr. Michael Okpara, appointed Obong Nyong Essien as the President of the House of Chiefs.

At the inaugural session of the House of Chiefs, one of the Members of the House Chief J. Mpri proposed Chief Nyong Essien's toast thus:

It is a pleasure for me to propose this motion. Chief Nyong Essien, most of you will remember, participated very actively in politics....For more than 20 years, he has been a legislator. He was a member of the old Legislative Council of Nigeria and later a member of the Eastern House of Assembly. He took part in the 1957 Constitutional Conference at which he pleaded the cause of the Chiefs of this Region. It was fitting that the Government of the Eastern Nigeria acknowledge his services by appointing him the first President of the Eastern House of Chiefs.

The motion was supported by Chief J. 0. Njemanze. Consequently, the House then unanimously called on Chief Nyong Essien to the Chair. Chief Nyong after taking the Chair, stood up and addressed the House thus:

Honorable Chiefs, in fact, I am dumb. I have no words to express myself. Anyway, I have to acknowledge the weight of my responsibility to you based on the honour you have conferred upon me. I am quite prepared to carry out the errand to your satisfaction. Nevertheless, I depend upon your support and co-operation.

At the inaugural session the Premier of the Eastern Region Dr. Michael Okpara also paid glowing tributes to the path-breaking nationalistic contributions of Chief Nyong Essien thus:

My President may I on behalf of my colleagues congratulate you on your elevation to this high office. We all remember your own personal contributions to the nationalistic movement. I recall when I was a young medical man that I noted you were one of the seven people who went to London to ask for independence for this country ....As has said, you have served in many legislatures. Therefore, you are conversant with the ways of Parliament. Fortunately, you are still young at heart and it is our earnest hope that you will still give this Honourable House many more years of fruitful service. May I once again congratulate you and say that I and my colleagues look forward to valuable contributions by this Honourabe House to the progress of this Region.

Chief Nyong Essien's contributions to the evolution Nigeria received the accolades of many. For instance, in a tribute published in the West African Pilot newspaper of 4 February 1948, Chief Mbonu Ojike, stated: Chief Nyong Essien will stand out as the father of the N.C.N.C. His activities during and after the delegation: will crown him the dauntless, he will always be remembered for hi: staunch stance in the Eastern Regional House of Assembly, in the Legislative Council sessions and his faith in Africa". ·

The May 1965 edition of The Nation, the official organ of the N.C.N.C., described Chief Nyong Essien as the oldest legislator in Nigeria and also rated him as the protagonist of cieftaincy rights and protector in Eastern Nigeria. It noted further that:

It was Obong Nyong Essien who founded the Eastern Regional House of Chiefs and also served as the founding President. .. it was he who almost single handedly defended the institution and rights of chiefs in the Eastern Region.

== His publications and the Shekinah Library ==
=== Publications ===
Chief Nyong Essien wrote many books some of which were, Twentieth Century Slavery in Calabar: Efik Profession! Pioneer; Who is the Sufferer? and The Biography of His Royal Highness the Late Prince Archibong Archibong of Calabar. He also published many articles in the existing newspapers of his time to advance his nationalism drive.

=== The "Shekinah" Library ===
Chief Nyong Essien described his books as his "jewels ancd choicest possession". In his unending search for knowledge, wisdom truth and justice, he always found comfort and solace in the company of books. To him, rich library was the best collection of knowledge. Because of this, he was master in the command and use of language. He was reputed to have owned one of the richest private libraries in Nigeria. Beside the court which he worked and gamed substantial experience, his intellectual growth came from his private library which was popularly called the "Shekinah Library". The word Shekinah according to him means, "the divine presence in the tabernacle or school for the dispersion of human ignorance"

The collection of books ranged from English; Politics; Law, Religion; Modern and Classica·l Languages; Geography; History; Philosophy; Accountancy; Anthropology-; Biology; Chemistry; Physics,;Agriculture to Mathematics. When he wrote to his friend, Dr. Nnamdi Azikiwe in the United States of America, he informed him about what he regarded as "curious volumes" like Studies in the Scriptures, The Silent Friend and Afedical Adviser which he bought for his library. He requested Dr. Azikiwe to mail to him two volumes of each of the following books, Negores Bible and the Philosophy of Marcus Garvey. He enclosed a two-Shilling money order for the purchase of the books. The "Shekinah Library" at a time had about 58 shelves which contained about 9,000 books. During the Nigerian Civil War, it was reporied that the Biafran carried away about 600 books. The library was later handed over to the University of Uyo. In appreciation, the University authorities re-named its library "Nyong Essien Library".

== Other responsibilities/appointments/honours ==
=== Traditional responsibilities ===
Chief Nyong Essioen became the Village Head of Issiet Ekim in 1938. Obong Nyong Essien was crowned Nsom Uruan 1 (The first officially recognised traditional ruler of the people of Uruan) in 1952 - a position he held till death in 1976. And the Paramount Ruler of Uyo Division now made up of (Uyo, Uruan, Nsit Atai and Ibesikpo-Asutan Local Government Areas) in 1974. With his good academic achievement, social and political awareness, and his eloquence he brought dignity and honour to the traditional stool. The Uruan Traditional Office, Nsom, was birthed in his time and also elevated to that of a first class chief with an official Staff of office.

=== Appointments ===
Chief Nyong Essien held a series of posts outside the legislature. Between 1954 and 1960, he was a member of the Eastern Regional Production Development Corporation and a member of the Eastern Region Board of Education.

=== Honours ===
His contributions to the foundational laying process of Nigeria attracted some mark of gratitude from certain quarters. He was awarded the most Distinguished Order of Saint Michael and Saint George in October, 1961, the Commander of the Order of the Niger in the same year and was made a patron of the institute of Education of the Missionary School, Ikot Ekpene in 1964. A Street in Uyo, Nyong Essien Street was also named after him. His statue also adorns a major roundabout along Uyo-Oron road in Uyo Capital City of Akwa Ibom State.

== Family life and death ==
Chief Nyong Essien got married in 1935 to Inyang Asuquo Okokon, daughter of Chief Asuquo Okokon of Ikot Adakpan, 0ku Iboku, Itu Local Government Area. Before his death, he had four sons and six daughters. Chief Nyong Essien died in his sleep in· October, 1976
