= 1941 Lagos by-election =

A by-election was held for the Lagos seat in the Legislative Council of Nigeria on 5 March 1941. It was required after the incumbent member Kofo Abayomi of the Nigerian Youth Movement (NYM) resigned in order to move to the United Kingdom to take up a Rhodes Scholarship in ophthalmology. Although Ernest Ikoli of the NYM was elected with 56% of the vote, the controversy caused by the election led to the eventual demise of the party.

== Campaign ==
After Abayomi resigned both Ikoli and Samuel Akisanya ran for the NYM nomination to be the party's candidate. Akinsanya had also sought the party's candidature for the 1940 by-election, but had lost to Jibril Martin. Akinola Maja joined the contest as a third candidate at a late stage.

An internal party primary was held in which Akinsanya received 108 votes, Ikoli 60 and Akinola Maja 37. However, the NYM central committee, which had the power to review the result, chose Ikoli as the party's candidate. Although Akinsanya initially congratulated Ikoli, he later changed his mind and decided to run as an independent with the support of Nnamdi Azikiwe.

== Results ==
Candidate	Party	Votes	%
Ernest Ikoli	Nigerian Youth Movement	523	56.00
Samuel Akisanya	Independent	411	44.00
Total		934	100.00
Source: Tamuno

== Aftermath ==
The controversy over the candidate selection resulted in a split in the NYM; Azikiwe left the party and was followed by several other members, eventually leading to the party being dissolved.
