= Ladoke Akintola =

Nigerian politician (1910–1966)

Premier of Western Nigeria
- In office 1 October 1960 – 15 January 1966
- Preceded by: Obafemi Awolowo
- Succeeded by: Position abolished

Personal details
- Born: Samuel Ladoke Akintola; 6 July 1910 Ogbomosho, Southern Nigeria Protectorate
- Died: 15 January 1966 (aged 55) Ibadan, Nigeria
- Party: Action Group; Nigerian National Democratic Party
- Spouse: Faderera Akintola
- Relations: Father; Akintola Akinbola
- Children: 5
- Occupation: Lawyer

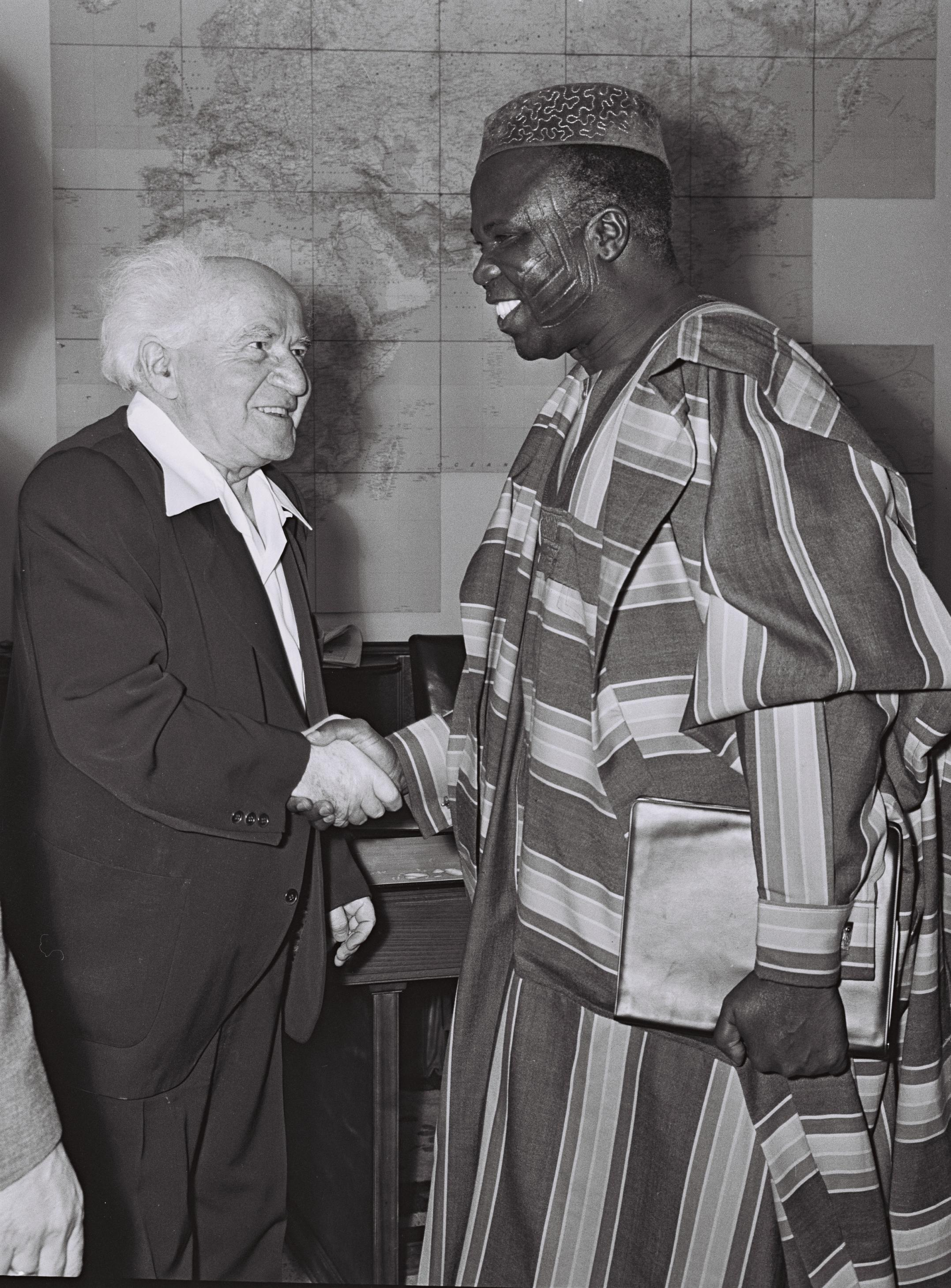
Samuel Akíntọ́lá with David Ben-Gurion during a visit to Israel in 1961

Chief Samuel Ládòkè Akíntọ́lá otherwise known as S.L.A. (6 July 1910 – 15 January 1966) was a Nigerian politician, aristocrat, orator, and lawyer. He served as Oloye Aare Ona Kakanfo XIII of Yorubaland and served as premier of Western Nigeria from independence in 1960 until his assassination in 1966.

== Early life ==
Akintola was born in Ogbomosho to the family of Akintola Akinbola and Akanke. His father was a trader and descended from a family of traders. At a young age, the family moved to Minna and he was briefly educated at a Church Missionary Society school in the city. In 1922, he returned to Ogbomosho to live with his grandfather and subsequently attended a Baptist day school before proceeding to Baptist College in 1925. He was a teacher at the Baptist Academy, Lagos from 1930 to 1942, he was a member of the Baptist teachers' union and thereafter worked briefly with the Nigerian Railway Corporation. During this period, he became acquainted with Chief H.O. Davies, a lawyer and politician and joined the Nigerian Youth Movement where he assisted Ikoli and supported the latter to represent Lagos in the legislative council over the candidacy of Oba Samuel Akisanya, who was supported by Nnamdi Azikiwe. He joined the staff of the Daily Service Newspaper and soon became the editor in 1943 with the support of Chief Akinola Maja, a shareholder, replacing Ernest Ikoli as editor. Akintola was also founder of Iroyin Yoruba (a newspaper written in the Yoruba language). In 1945, he opposed the general strike led by Azikiwe's NCNC and Michael Imoudu, earning the distrust of politicians like Chief Anthony Enahoro. In 1946, he earned a British scholarship to study in the UK and completed legal studies by 1950. He started his legal career working as a lawyer on land and civic matters. In 1952, he formed a partnership with Chief Chris Ogunbanjo, Chief Bode Thomas and Michael Odesanya.

== Political career ==
After he was trained as a lawyer in the United Kingdom, Ladoke Akintola returned to Nigeria in 1949 and teamed up with other educated Nigerians from the Western Region to form the Action Group (AG) under the leadership of Chief Obafemi Awolowo. He was initially the legal adviser of the group before becoming the deputy leader in 1953 after the death of Bode Thomas. He defeated Arthur Prest in the primary to succeed Thomas. As the deputy leader of the AG party, he did not serve in the Western Region Government headed by the premier Awolowo but was the Action Group Parliamentary Leader/Leader of Opposition in the House of Representatives of Nigeria. At the federal level he served as Minister for Health and later Minister for Communications and Aviation.

Decisions over the direction of strategic alliances by the party, the adoption of democratic socialism as the party's platform and the Battle for supremacy in the party led to disagreement between Akintola and Awolowo. Akintola disagreed with Awolowo's decision not to join the coalition government. Akintola wanted to align the Action Group party with the Northern People's Congress. He also opposed the party's decision to adopt democratic socialism as its ideology, preferring a more conservative stance.

== Criticism ==
Akintola was accused by Chief Awolowo of trying to supplant him as Leader of the party. In May 1962, the Western House of Assembly set to remove Akintola after the party had earlier passed a vote of no confidence in the premier in a party meeting, crisis erupted on the floor of the house. The AG party broke into two factions leading to several crises in the Western Region House of Assembly that led the central/federal government, headed by the prime minister Sir Abubakar Tafawa Balewa to declare State of Emergency rule in the region and Chief (Dr.) M.A Majekodunmi, the Federal Minister of Health was appointed as administrator. Eventually Akintola was restored to power (even though he had lost the legal battle with the Judicial Committee of the Privy Council, then Nigeria's highest tribunal) as Premier in 1963. In the general election of 1964, Akintola won his position as Premier, not as member of the Action Group party, but as the leader of a newly formed party called Nigerian National Democratic Party (NNDP), which was in an alliance with the Northern People's Congress (NPC) the party that then controlled the federal government. His blatantly rigged election in 1965 was undoubtedly an immediate cause of the January 1966 coup in which he was slain.

== Death ==
Akintola was assassinated in Ibadan, the capital of Western Region, on the day of Nigeria's first military coup of 15 January 1966—which terminated the First Republic. Also known as the "Young Majors Coup" or the "coup of the January boys", the coup resulted in the assassination of many leading politicians, mostly members of the Northern People's Congress.

After his death, the Aare Ona Kankanfo title was vacant for 21 years until Chief Moshood Abiola was invested with it as the 14th Aare Ona Kankanfo by Alaafin Adeyemi III of Oyo on 14 January 1988.

== Impact ==
Akintola was a dignified orator. In 1962 he was responsible for completing the founding of the University of Ife, a university that was later named after his political opponent, Obafemi Awolowo. While popularly believed, there is no verifiable evidence that Awolowo ever initiated or suggested the establishment of the University of Ife, which was renamed in his honour. Akintola was also involved in the development of Premier Hotel and other monuments.

== Personal life ==
Akintola was married to Faderera Akintola and had five children, two (Yomi Akintola and Dr. Abimbola Akintola) of whom held Finance cabinet portfolios in the Nigerian Third Republic. Yomi Akintola also served as Nigeria's Ambassador to Hungary and Samuel Akintola's daughter-in-law, Dupe Akintola, was Nigeria's High Commissioner in Jamaica. His fourth child, Victor Ladipo Akintola, dedicated much of his life to ensuring the continued accurate accounting of Samuel Akintola's contributions to Nigeria's position on the world stage. He published many works including a biography that highlighted his father's love of country and lifelong commitment to its progress. Akintola's youngest child, Tokunbo Akintola, was the first black boy at Eton College and features prominently in the best selling book by the Nigerian author Dillibe Onyeama, Nigger at Eton.

Justice Ladiran Akintola, an Oyo State judge and former law lecturer at the Obafemi Awolowo University is Akintola's child born out of wedlock.

A number of institutions, including Ladoke Akintola University of Technology, Ogbomosho, were established in Akintola's home town and other Nigerian cities as a means of remembering him posthumously.

== See also ==
- Jacob Odulate

Region	Period	Governor	Premier	Notes
Eastern Region	Oct 1960 - Jan 1966	Francis Akanu Ibiam	Michael Okpara	
Mid-Western Region	Aug 1963 - Feb 1964	Dennis Osadebay	Dennis Osadebay (Administrator)	Region created from part of Western Region on 8 August 1963
Mid-Western Region	Feb 1964 - Jan 1966	Jereton Mariere	Dennis Osadebay	
Northern Region	Oct 1960 - 1962	Gawain Westray Bell	Ahmadu Bello	
Northern Region	1962 - Jan 1966	Kashim Ibrahim	Ahmadu Bello	
Western Region	Oct 1960 - May 1962	Adesoji Aderemi	Samuel Ladoke Akintola	
Western Region	May 1962 - Dec 1962	Adesoji Aderemi	Moses Majekodunmi (Administrator)	Administrator appointed during political crisis
Western Region	Jan 1963 - Jan 1966	Joseph Fadahunsi	Samuel Akintola	
