= Methodist Boys' High School, Lagos =

Secondary school in Victoria Island, Lagos, Nigeria

- Victoria Island, Lagos; Nigeria

Information
- Religious affiliation: Methodism
- Established: 1878; 148 years ago
- Gender: Boys

Methodist Boys' High School, Lagos (MBHS Lagos) is a secondary school for boys located in Victoria Island, Lagos, Nigeria. Founded in 1878, it was the second secondary school established in Nigeria.

== History ==
The leaders of the Methodist community, including Charles Joseph George, met in 1874 to discuss founding a secondary school for members of their communion as an alternative to the CMS Grammar School, Bariga Lagos. After a fund-raising drive, construction of the building commenced and the Methodist Boys' High School, Lagos building was completed in June 1877.

On March 14, 1878 the new school was formally opened, with Rev. W. Terry Coppin as the first principal. In April 1878, the first batch of students were taken in. There were 12 names on the roll. Among the 12 boys was George Stone Smith, the first on the list and therefore the Senior Foundation Scholar. There were also six mission agents-in-training. By the end of the year the number on roll had increased to 23 boys and seven agents, and work had commenced in earnest. Methodist Boys' High School, Lagos, thus became the second secondary school in Nigeria, after the CMS Grammar School, Bariga, Lagos founded in 1859 and Baptist Academy, Obanikoro, Lagos, in 1885. Baptist Academy started as a primary school in 1855 then converted to be a secondary school in 1885.

MBHS Lagos and CMS Grammar School, Bariga, Lagos, subsequently teamed up to provide take-off students for Igbobi College, Yaba, Lagos, founded through collaboration of the Methodist Church Nigeria and the Anglican Communion in Nigeria, in 1932.

The motto of the school is "Non Sibi Sed Aliis", meaning "Not For Us, But For Others".

The current school hymn is "Land of Our Birth, We Pledge to Thee".

The uniform is made up of shorts for juniors and trousers for seniors; long-sleeve shirt, school tie of blue, gold and maroon; and a white jacket. A maroon blazer is normally used for ceremonial events.

== Houses and sports ==
The school has four houses into which the entire students' population is distributed randomly for the purpose of annual inter-house competition. The houses are Didsbury House, Handsworth House, Kingswood House and Westminster House. Notable athletes were produced from this competition such as Sunday Oliseh who was at one time Captain of the Green Eagles, the senior national team of Nigeria. The school won the Zard Cup for Secondary Schools in 1948 and the Principal's Cup for Secondary Schools in Lagos State in 1961 among other laurels.

== Location ==
Methodist Boys' High School, Lagos started on Broad Street, Lagos and remained on the site for over 100 years. Subsequently, a 60-hectare parcel of land in Ojoo, Lagos - Badagry Road, Lagos State, was allocated to the school by the Lagos State Government for the purpose of expansion and better suitability for learning. Though significant development was made on the new location towards the relocation of the school planned for 1982, the new location was eventually taken over by the Lagos State Government and now serve as the permanent site of the Lagos State University.

In 1983, a new 5.7-acre parcel of land in Victoria Island, Lagos, was allocated to the school as a partial compensation for the Ojoo Site, Badagry, Lagos State, that was taken over by the Lagos State Government for the use of the Lagos State University. The school operates on the Victoria Island site.

== MBHS Lagos Old Boys' Association ==
The Old Boys' Association was established early enough to play a crucial role during the Golden Jubilee celebrations of the school held in 1928. The first student on the list at take off of the school, the Senior Foundation Scholar, George Stone Smith, who later became Dr. Orishadipe Obasa, served as the first President of the Association.

In appreciation of the qualitative education received from the school and to give back towards improved infrastructures for the current students, the Old Boys' Association built the Centenary Hall to mark the 100-year anniversary of the school, built a chapel, and donated staff quarters.

The old boys organize and meet regularly, both within and outside Nigeria, including branches in the United Kingdom and North America.

== Principals ==
- Rev. W. Terry Coppin, 1878–1883
- Rev. George W. Baxter, 1883–1884
- Rev Edmund Tomlin, 1884
- Rev. M. J. Elliott, 1885
- Rev. J. H. Wellington, 1886–1889
- Rev. W. B. Euba, 1889–1896
- Rev. J. H. Samuel, 1896–1902
- Rev. W. B. Euba, 1902–1912
- Rev. A. W. Moulton Wood, 1912–1918
- Rev. H. W. Stacey, 1919–1927
- Rev. J. A. Angus, 1927–1932
- Mr. J. T. Jackson, 1932–1943
- Rev. W. Roberts, 1943–1946
- Mr. A. B. Oyediran (Old Boy), 1947–1955
- Rev. S. A. Osinulu, 1956–1962
- Chief. D. A. Famoroti, 1962–1979
- Mr. O. O. Soewu (Old Boy), 1979–1981 and 2004–2005
- Chief. A. A. Osuneye (Old Boy), 1981-1989
- Mr. E. F. Olukunle (Old Boy), 1990–1994
- Prince. S. O. Saibu, 1995–2001
- Mr. Ademola Johnson (Old Boy), 2001–2004
- Rev. S. A. Ogunniyi, 2005–2007
- Mr. J. A. Oyegbile (acting), 2007–2008
- The Rev Samuel O. Osinubi, 2008–2009
- Mr. F. F. Akinsete (acting), 2009
- The Rev. Titus Kayode Fatunla, 2009–2012
- The Very Rev Capt. Phillip Okunoren (Old Boy), 2012–October 2015
- The Very Rev. David Oyebade, October 2015–October 2016
- The Very Rev Paul Olukunga, October 2016–present

== Notable alumni ==
- Kofo Abayomi - founder of the Nigerian Youth Movement
- Fola Adeola - co-founder and first Chief Executive Officer, Guaranty Trust Bank Plc
- Oladele Ajose - first African Vice Chancellor, Obafemi Awolowo University
- Fatiu Ademola Akesode - former Vice Chancellor, Lagos State University
- Benjamin Nnamdi Azikiwe - first Governor General and President of Nigeria
- Hezekiah Oladipo Davies - Queen's Counsel and one of the founding fathers of Nigerian politics
- Babatunde Elegbede - former military governor of Cross Rivers State, member of the Babangida's regime Armed Forces Ruling Council and Director of the Defence Intelligence Agency (Nigeria)
- Mobolaji Johnson - first military governor, Lagos State, Nigeria
- Adekunle Lawal - second military overnor, Lagos State, Nigeria
- Daniel Olukoya - General Overseer of Mountain Of Fire And Ministries
- Gabriel Olusanya - diplomat, Ambassador to France
- Hezekiah Ademola Oluwafemi - former Vice Chancellor, Obafemi Awolowo University, Ile-Ife
- Olusegun Osoba - first civilian governor, Ogun State, Nigeria
- Ola Rotimi - playwright and author
- Lateef Akinola Salako - National Merit Award winner, professor of Medicine
- Idowu Taylor - Chief Justice of Lagos State and Justice of the Supreme Court of Nigeria
- Adolphus Wabara - former President of the Senate of the Federal Republic of Nigeria
- Atanda Fatai Williams - former Chief Justice of Nigeria
- G. B. A. Coker - former Justice of the Nigerian Supreme Court
- Sunday Oliseh - Nigerian footballer and former national coach
- Femi Otedola - Nigerian businessman and philanthropist. He is the former chairman of Forte Oil PLC, and is the current executive chairman of Geregu Power PLC

== See also ==
- Education in Nigeria
- List of schools in Lagos
