= Abubakar Olorun-Nimbe =

Nigerian politician

Abubakar Ibiyinka Olorun-Nimbe (1908–1975) was a Nigerian medical doctor and politician who was the first Mayor of Lagos. He represented Lagos in the Legislative Council.

== Early life and career ==
Olorun-Nimbe was born in Lagos to the family of Abdur-Raham and Ramotu Olorunimbe. His father was a member of Herbert Macaulay's Nigerian National Democratic Party and a Lagos-based community group known as the Egbe Ilu. Olorun-Nimbe started his education learning Quranic verses, he then proceeded to study at a government primary school in Lagos. Thereafter, he attended CMS Grammar School, Lagos before transferring to King's College, Lagos. In 1930, he gained admission into Glasgow University to study medicine. He finished his medical studies in 1938 as a qualified medical practitioner and surgeon. He returned to Nigeria in September 1938 and joined the colonial service as a Junior Medical Officer. His appointment was terminated by the colonial service in 1940 and he went into full-time private practice in Lagos establishing Alafia Hospital.

== Political career ==
Olorun-Nimbe's foray into politics started in 1944 when he was elected a councillor in the Lagos Town Council and he was a participant in NCNC's Pan-Nigerian tour. He also contested a December 1945 by-election for the Legislative Council, and was elected with 68% of the vote, and was re-elected in the 1947 general elections. During the same year, he was also a member of NCNC's delegation to London to protest the Richards Constitution which operated on the practice of nomination rather than election to the regional and central assembly.

=== Mayor of Lagos ===
In 1950, the Lagos Local Government Ordinance, N.17 provided for the election of 24 councillors to the Lagos Town Council and for the position of a mayor of Lagos to be selected from those councillors. Olorun-Nimbe was selected the first mayor of Lagos in 1950 and head of Lagos Township council, he was assisted by Mbonu Ojike. He was in the position until 1953. His position as mayor caused a rift between him and the Oba of Lagos, Adeniji Adele. On 31 June 1951, under the Macpherson Constitution, Lagos colony was merged with Western Region for administrative purposes. The law allowed five representatives to represent Lagos in the regional assembly at Ibadan and also two presentatives to be chosen by the regional assembly among the elected representatives of Lagos to represent the colony in the Federal House of Representatives. Olorun-Nimbe's party NCNC won all five Lagos seats and the party decided to send Adeleke Adedoyin and Azikiwe to the central legislature from the Western Assembly. In the Western Assembly, the Action Group which had control of the assembly voted for Adedoyin and Olorun-nimbe as Lagos representatives to the Federal House of Representatives scuttling Azikiwe's plan to move to the center. However, contrary to NCNC's position that Olorun-Nimbe remain in Lagos as Mayor, he decided to combine both roles as mayor and Federal House of Representative refusing to step down for Azikiwe, this left the party leader out of playing any role in the center. Olorun-Nimbe was later expelled from the party.

Political offices
Preceded by Position established	Mayor of Lagos; 1950-1953	Succeeded by Sir Emmanuel Augustus Oluyele Bright l
