= Oyinkansola Abayomi =

Nigerian politician (1897–1990)

Oyinkansola, Lady Abayomi
- Oyinkansola, Lady Abayomi
- Born: Oyinkansola Ajasa; 6 March 1897; Lagos, Nigeria (then Lagos Colony in the British Empire)
- Died: 19 March 1990 (aged 93); Lagos, Nigeria
- Other name: Oyinkan
- Education: Anglican Girls Seminary School, Lagos; Young Ladies Academy, England; Royal Academy of Music
- Occupations: Feminist, educator, scouting guide
- Known for: Girl Guides
- Notable work: She was the head of the Nigerian Girl Guides and founder of the Nigerian Women's Party
- Spouses: Moronfolu Abayomi (died 1923) Kofo Abayomi (died 1979)
- Father: Kitoye Ajasa
- Honours: Chieftaincy

Iyaloye Oyinkansola, Lady Abayomi (6 March 1897 – 19 March 1990) was a Nigerian nationalist and feminist. She was the head of the Nigerian Girl Guides and founder of the Nigerian Women's Party.

== Early life and education ==
She was born Oyinkansola Ajasa in Nigeria in 1897. She was called Oyinkan (the shortened form of Oyinkansola) by her family. She had a younger brother, Akuisola, who died when he was two. Her father was Sir Kitoye Ajasa, a prominent Saro tribesman who was the first Nigerian to be knighted by the British, and her mother was Lucretia Olayinka Moore, an omoba of an Egba royal family. She was also the first cousin of Kofo, Lady Ademola. She attended Anglican Girls' Seminary school, Lagos. She graduated in 1909. She then went to school at the Young Ladies Academy at Ryford Hall, located in Gloucestershire, England. In 1917, she attended the Royal Academy of Music in London. She moved back to Lagos in 1920. She became a music teacher at the Anglican Girls' Seminary. It was during this time when she met a lawyer named Moronfolu Abayomi. They married in August 1923. He would be assassinated in court two months later.

== Life and work in Nigeria ==
While in England, Abayomi had joined the Girl Guides. When she returned to Nigeria, she connected with the local Lagos Nigerian Girl Guides Association, which was founded by an English woman. Abayomi joined the group and was the first Nigerian woman to serve as a supervisor. She also became active in the education of women and girls in Nigeria, which was not equal to that of men and boys. She joined the Lagos Women's Organization. She did fundraising and promoting for Queen's College through the West African Educated Girls' Club, an organization she founded. It opened in 1927. She was a founding teacher at the school. She was the only Nigerian to work there. Around this time, she became one of the first women in Lagos to drive a car.

In 1930, Abayomi married the doctor Kofo Abayomi. In 1931, the Girl Guides was recognized and given support by the Nigerian government. Abayomi became the chief commissioner for the Girl Guides. She was the head of the Nigerian Girl Guides Association and the first native Nigerian woman to work for the organization. She joined the Nigerian Youth Movement in 1935. She wrote an article in the organization's journal that year, demanding that wealthy women of Nigeria needed to fight for women's rights and be willing to work with women of middle and lower classes for those rights. On May 10, 1944, she founded the Nigerian Women's Party during a meeting at her home with twelve women. The organization sought equal rights for women. When Kofo Abayomi was knighted by the Queen of the United Kingdom in 1954, Abayomi became known as Lady Abayomi.

== Later life and death ==
Sir Kofo Abayomi died on 1 January 1979. Abayomi retired from the Girl Guides in 1982. She was named Life President of the Girl Guides for her work.

Abayomi was honored with five Nigerian chieftaincy titles, including that of the Iya Abiye of Egbaland. She died on 19 March 1990.
