= Isara-Remo =

Ancient town in present-day Ogun State, Nigeria

Isara-Remo is an ancient town in the present-day Remo North Local Government Area in Ogun State in Nigeria. It is the headquarters of the Remo North local government area (LGA). It has an area of 199 km^{2} and a population of 59,911 at the 2006 census. It is the 6th largest town in Ogun state following Abeokuta, Ijebu Ode, ijebu Igbo, Sagamu and Ago Iwoye. Isara-Remo is almost exactly halfway between Lagos and Ibadan, very large metropolitan cities that have strongly influenced the history of Nigeria. Isara also is a very agricultural city having large fields very fertile for agriculture as well as having large deposits of Muscovite, high quality clay, granite, quarry, and sand. Isara-Remo is right beside Ipara-Remo and they share similar traditions.

== History ==
Isara-Remo was founded in 1406 by a hunter who was an Ife prince. Prince Adeyemo had wandered into the hinterlands hunting for game. History has it that since Prince Adeyemo had little or no chance at all of attaining the throne in Ife, he elected to create his own living away from the palace and on getting to what is now called 'Okerekere' in present-day Isara, he found the site suitable due to its defensive topography and decided to settle there. He had in his entourage two men of repute; Ise and Ara who were his advisers. Both men settled in locations not too far from each other and the saying 'I am going to Ise and Ara' - mo fe lo si odo Ise ati Ara - was soon contracted into 'I am visiting Ise-Ara' -mo fe lo ri Ise-Ara. This is where the name of the town - Isara (from Ise-Ara) - eventually came from, in honor of those great men. After settling in the location, because he was a prince, he became the de facto king of the town and took the title Ode-omo. The title has since been contracted into Odemo and remains the official title of the Oba. Till date, all Obas of Isara have gotten their official emblems and crowns from Ile -Ife.

A town of predominantly farmers and hunters, the men of Isara-Remo have not been known to take part in any major wars except as peacemakers. The city has been called "Isara city of joy." An old saying describes it as "Isara afotamodi, ko'gun ma wo 'lu," which roughly translates into "Isara of the impregnable city walls".

== Royal families ==
The present Isara has six royal households, all direct descendants of Prince Adeyemo of Ife. These are the House of Igan, the House of Rokodo-Erinshiba, the House of Ogunshere-Gbuko, the House of Afonlade, the House of Poke Bi Owu'la, the House of Ayoledoye. In an ancient traditional rotation system, each family takes turns to present its preferred son or candidate to serve as the Odemo of Isara.

== Religion and politics ==
The population practices Christianity and Islam in similar proportions. Its people still practice the Egungun, Oro, Agemo and other traditional celebrations as well.

The town is bordered by the Ode-Remo, Akaka, Ipara and Imagbon communities. Isara-Remo is important in Ogun state for its belief in people politics in lieu of party politics.

== Notable natives and residents ==
- Oloye Wole Soyinka, poet, writer and playwright, winner of the 1986 Nobel Prize for Literature. In his memoir Ake: The Years of Childhood, Chief Soyinka refers to the fact that he is related to the royal family of Isara through his father.
- Oba Samuel Akisanya, (1 August 1898 – 1985) was a Nigerian trade unionist and nationalist based in Lagos, Nigeria during the colonial era. One of the founders of the Nigerian Youth Movement, he was also the Odemo of Isara, an office which he held from 1941 until his death.
- Oloye Fatai Sowemimo, (born 5 March 1955) is a Nigerian Businessman and Politician from Ogun State, Remo-North. He is the Chairman of Ogun State Water Corporation.
