= 1947 Nigerian general election =

General elections were held in Nigeria in 1947. The Nigerian National Democratic Party (NNDP) won three of the four elected seats in the Legislative Council.

== Electoral system ==
The elections were the first and only elections to be held under the 1946 constitution introduced by Governor Arthur Richards. There were few changes to the electoral system created by the 1922 constitution; the number of elected members remained at four (three from Lagos and one from Calabar), and the only significant reform was the reduction in the annual income qualification for voters from £100 to £50.

The number of official members was reduced from 27 to 16, and included the Governoer, 13 ex officio members (the Chief Secretary, the Chief Commissioners of the three provinces, the Attorney General, the Financial Secretary, the Directors of Agriculture, Education, Medical Services and Public Works, the Development Secretary and the Commissioners of Labour and of the Colony) and three nominated officials (senior residents in Kano and Oyo provinces and a resident from British Cameroons. However, the number of appointed unofficials was increased from 15 to 24, with nine members from the Northern Provinces (the Emirs of Abuja, Gwandu, Igbirra and Katsina and five others nominated by the House of Assembly), six members from the Western Province (the Ooni of Ife, the Oba of Benin and four others nominated by the House of Assembly), five members from the Eastern Provinces (all nominated by the House of Assembly), one member from the Colony of Lagos and three members to represent otherwise unrepresented interests.

== Campaign ==
Seven candidates contested the elections, five for the three Lagos seats and two for the Calabar seat. In Lagos the NNDP nominated the journalist Nnamdi Azikiwe, barrister Adeleke Adedoyin and sitting Council member Abubakar Olorun-Nimbe, whilst F. O. Coker and Ernest Ikoli (also a Council member) ran as independents. However, Ikoli withdrew his candidacy prior to election day.

In Calabar the seat was contested by the incumbent Okon Efiong and E. E. E. Anwan, both of whom ran as independents.

== Results ==
Party	Votes	%	Seats	+/–
Nigerian National Democratic Party	10,295	93.58	3	+3
Independents	706	6.42	1	–1
Total	11,001	100.00	4	0
Source: Tamuno

=== By constituency ===
Calabar (one member)
Candidate	Party	Votes	%
E. E. E. Anwan	Independent	275	69.10
Okon Efiong	Independent	123	30.90
Total		398	100.00
Source: Tamuno

Lagos (three members)
Candidate	Party	Votes	%
Nnamdi Azikiwe	Nigerian National Democratic Party	3,573	33.70
Adeleke Adedoyin	Nigerian National Democratic Party	3,377	31.85
Abubakar Olorun-Nimbe	Nigerian National Democratic Party	3,345	31.55
F. O. Coker	Independent	308	2.90
Total		10,603	100.00
Total votes		3,573	–
Registered voters/turnout		5,379	66.42
Source: Tamuno
