= Samuel Akisanya =

Nigerian trade unionist and nationalist

Samuel Adetayo Akisanya
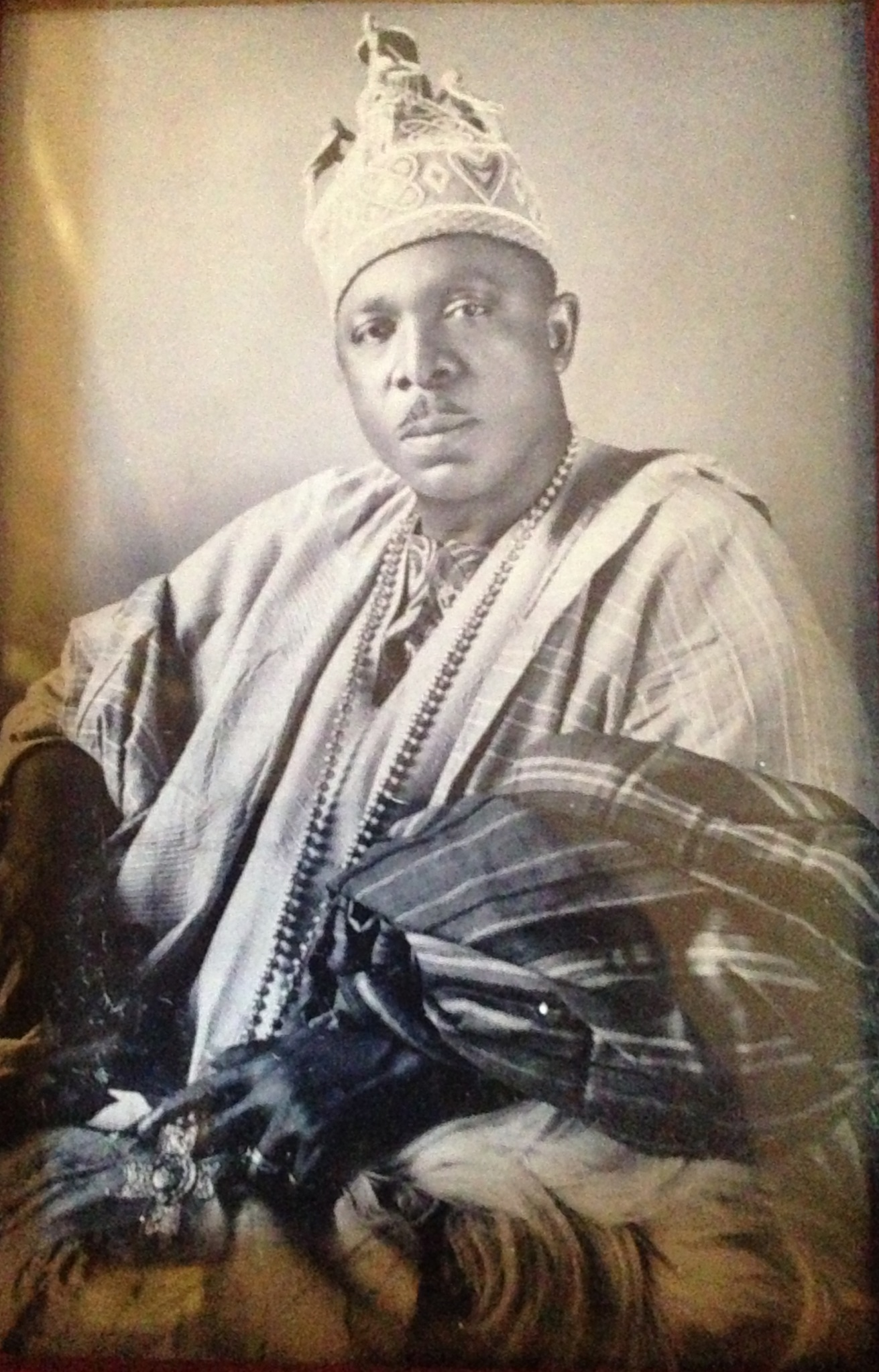
- Born: 1 August 1898; Ishara, Nigeria
- Died: 1 January 1985 (aged 86)
- Occupations: Odemo (or traditional king) of Isara and political activist; Nigerian trade unionist
- Known for: Political activism and King of Isara

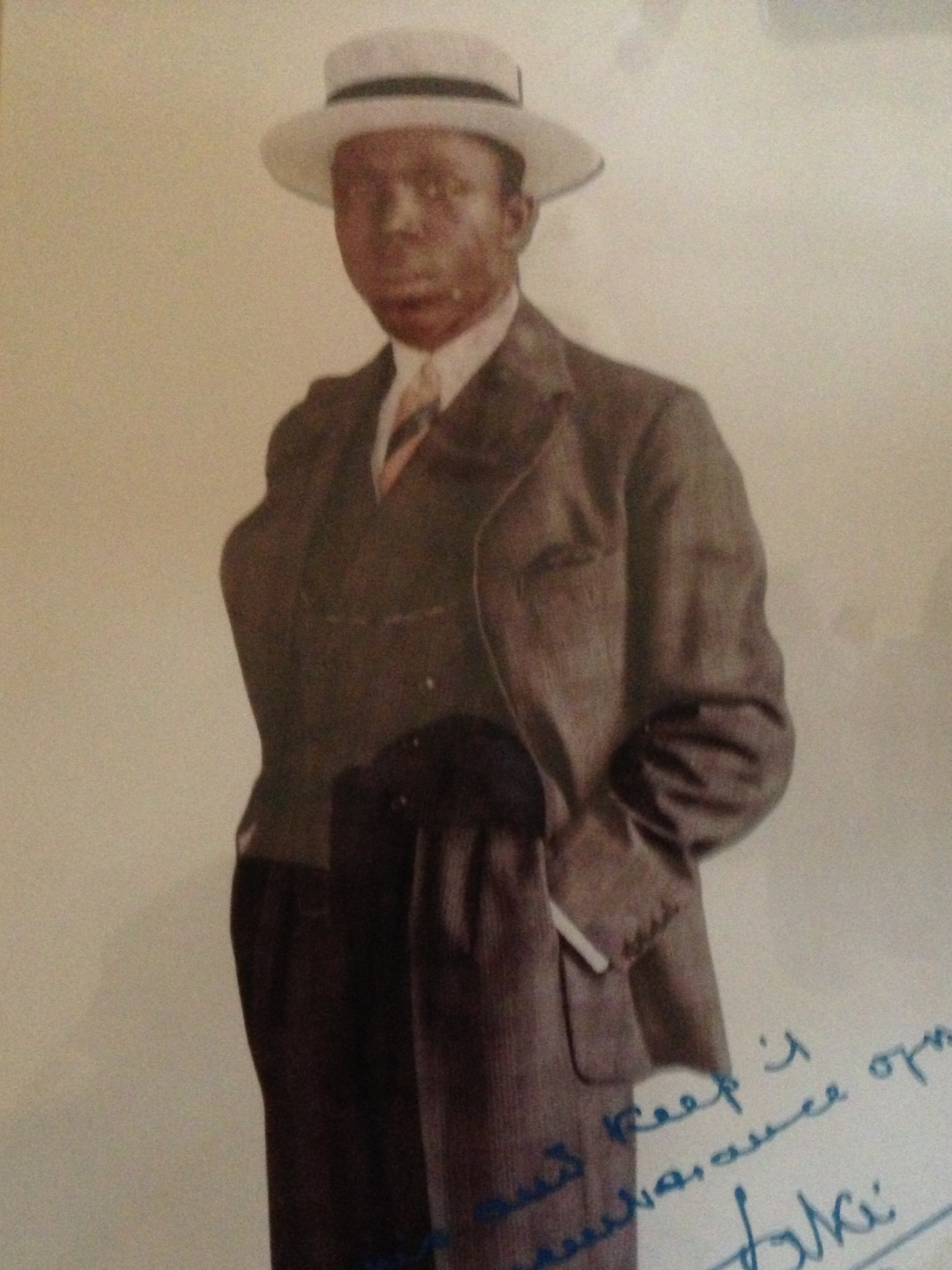
Akisanya in his younger days

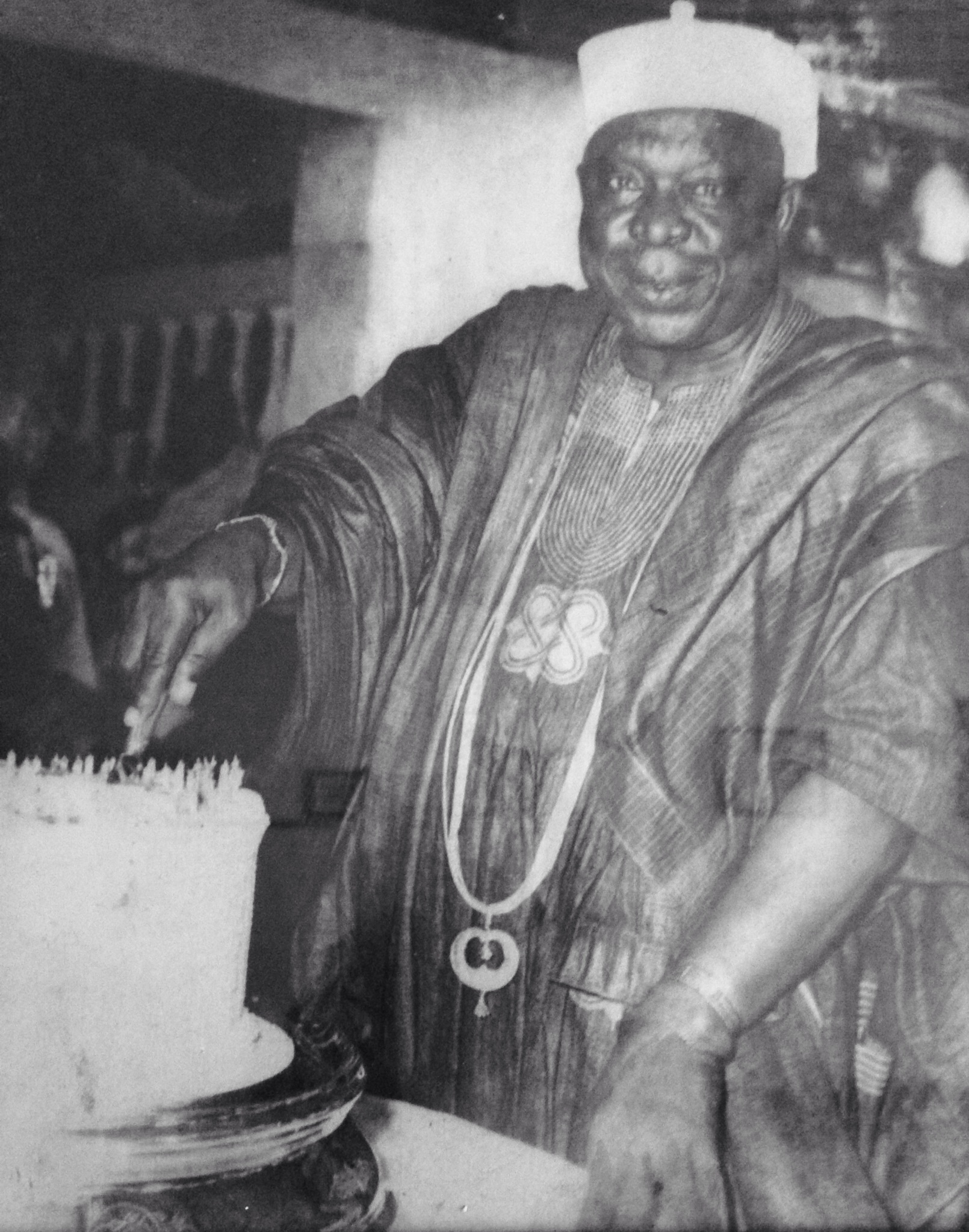
Odemo Akisanya celebrating his birthday

Samuel Akisanya (1 August 1898 – January 1985) was a Nigerian trade unionist and nationalist based in Lagos, Nigeria during the colonial era, one of the founders of the Nigerian Youth Movement. He was also the Oba of Isara, an office which he held from 1941 until his death. He is today widely regarded as the greatest king in the history of the city.

== Early years ==
Akisanya was born on August 1, 1898, in Isara. He was a cousin of Samuel Ayodele Soyinka, father of nobel laureate Wole Soyinka. He attended the Anglican School in Ishara, then obtained work as a shorthand typist and writer from 1916 to 1931. Around 1923, the Study Circle was founded in Lagos, with a number of prominent young members including Akisanya, H.A. Subair, R.A. Coker, Olatunji Caxton-Martins and Adetokunbo Ademola. The group sponsored essay-writing, lectures, debates and book reviews, and later became a forum for discussing political issues.

== Political activist ==
Akisanya became the organising secretary of the Nigerian Produce Traders Union (N.P.T.U.) and President of the Nigerian Motor Transport Union between 1932 and 1940.He was one of the founders of the Lagos Youth Movement in 1934, which was later renamed the Nigerian Youth Movement (NYM) in 1936. Other founding members were Dr. J.C. Vaughan, Ernest Ikoli and H.O. Davies.Akisanya was appointed general secretary and later became vice-president of the movement. The initial stimulus for founding the movement was controversy over the standard of education to be offered by the newly founded Yaba College, but the NYM was to grow into Nigeria's first genuinely nationalist organisation. In 1938, Akisanya was one of the seven subscribers to the Service Press Limited, which acquired the assets and liabilities of the Daily Service newspaper.

In 1937 some expatriate firms led by Cadbury Brothers formed a buying agreement, a cartel to control the price paid to producers of cocoa and to cut out the middlemen. The N.P.T.U., which represented these middlemen and was led by Akisanya, launched an effective public attack on the agreement. The union organised protest meetings and threatened to hold up transport of the crop, or in extreme to destroy the crop. The government attempted to defuse the crisis by supporting opponents of Akisanya. Eventually it blew over when cocoa prices rose the next year.

== Later career ==
In 1941, the NYM President Kofo Abayomi resigned from the Legislative Council of the colony to pursue studies abroad, forcing a by-election. Akisanya sought to be the NYM candidate for the vacant seat, competing against the distinguished journalist Ernest Ikoli, an Ijo. Akisanya was vice-president of the party while Ikoli had recently been elected president to replace Abayomi. At a general meeting of the NYM, Akisanya received 108 votes, Ikoli received 60 and Akinola Maja received 37. However, the executive chose not to endorse the vote but instead declared that Ikoli was selected. Akisanya, supported by Nnamdi Azikiwe, claimed that he had been rejected only because the dominant Lagos Yorubas would not accept nomination of an Ijebu Yoruba. Akisanya resigned from the NYM and ran as an independent, but lost to Ikoli. A press war followed between the Pilot and the Daily Service.

Akisanya became a Yoruba chief when he was enthroned as the Odemo of Isara. He held this position from 1941 until his death in 1985. He was a member of the Western House of Chiefs from 1952 until 1961. Akisanya was a founding member of the Action Group party in 1951. He was appointed a minister without portfolio in the government of the Western Region from 1952 to 1955. During the First Republic, Akisanya called Ladoke Akintola, premier of the Western region and his deputy, Remi Fani-Kayode "misguided small boys" when they decided to punish some of the Yoruba chiefs. The punishment entailed – in part – a massive cut to the salary/stipend paid by the government to the Yoruba chiefs. Samuel Akisanya, in particular, had his payments reduced to 1 penny annually, earning him the nickname "a penny a year Oba". In November 1968, peasants attacked Akisanya for allegedly supporting the government's aggressive tax collection policy.
