= Otunba Fatai Sowemimo =

Nigerian businessman and politician

Otunba Fatai Sowemimo (born March 5, 1955) is a Nigerian businessman and politician. He is chairman of Ogun State Water Corporation. He was in the Ogun State House of Assembly from 1999 until 2003.

== Early life ==
Fatai Sekoni Sowemimo was born on 5 March 1955 in Isara, son of Sekoni and Alhaja Muyibat Olabimpe Sowemimo. He attended Sapade Grammar School in Isara, then obtained a Bachelors of Science in Business Administration from Chicago State University.

== Career ==
He is the managing director of Wemson Real Estate Management.

=== Politics ===
He was the Chairman of Ikenne Local Government. When Remo North Local Government was formed out of Ikenne Local Government in October 1996 by order of Sani Abacha, this move ushered in the creation of new local governments throughout Nigeria. Through this, he became the First Sole administrator/ chairman until March 24, 1997.

In 1999, Fatai Sowemimo became a member of the Ogun State House of Assembly, representing Remo-North. After completing his tenure as a legislator in 2003, he contested the House of Representatives election, but lost. He continued his political efforts and served as Commissioner in the Ministry of Youths, Sports and Employment Generation at Abeokuta, Ogun.

On August 13, 2020, he was appointed chairman of Ogun State Water Corporation.

== Personal life ==
He and his wife Kehinde have three children.
