= Remo North =

- LGA
- Interactive map of Remo North
- Location in Nigeria
- Coordinates: 7°00′N 3°43′E
- Country: Nigeria
- State: Ogun State
- Headquarter: Isara

Government
  - Local Government Chairman: Honorable Ayodele Olumuyiwa Sodade(APC)

Area
  - Total: 199 km^{2} (77 sq mi)

Population (2006 census)
  - Total: 59,911
  - Density: 301/km^{2} (780/sq mi)
- Time zone: UTC+1 (WAT)
- 3-digit postal code prefix: 121
- ISO 3166 code: NG.OG.RN

Remo North is a Local Government Area in Ogun State, Nigeria. Its headquarters are in the town of Isara at 7°00′N 3°41′E.

It has an area of 199 km^{2} and has a population of 59,911 at the 2006 census.

The postal code of the area is 121.
