= Ernest Ikoli =

Nigerian politician

Ernest Sissei Ikoli (1893–1960) was a Nigerian politician, nationalist and pioneering journalist. He was the first editor of the Daily Times, the president of the Nigerian Youth Movement, and in 1942, represented Lagos in the Legislative Council.

== Early life and career ==
Ikoli was born in Nembe in present-day Bayelsa State and educated at Bonny Government School, Rivers State and King's College, Lagos. After completing his studies at King's College, he became a tutor at the school - a post which he left to pursue a career in journalism. For a period he worked at the Lagos Weekly Record, a paper that has since disappeared. He was the first editor of the Daily Times of Nigeria, which was launched in June 1926 with Adeyemo Alakija as chairman of the board. He later became publisher of the now defunct African Messenger. In the 1930s he was one of the founders of the Nigerian Youth Movement and was once the movement's president. During this period, the movement was engaged in an intense power struggle with Herbert Macaulay's NNDP. His tenure in the print media business had a vast impact on Nigeria's road to independence from colonial rule. The media was one of the best ways that Nigerian nationalists could communicate with their colonial rulers at the time.

== Nigerian Youth Movement ==
He started the Nigerian Youth Movement with other prominent Nigerians like Hezekiah Oladipo Davies, James Churchill Vaughan and Oba Samuel Akisanya (aka General Saki). The movement originally started as the Lagos youth movement, it was partly formed to voice concerns about the lackluster colonial higher education policy. The movement was largely Lagos based but as varied members entered the organization, it metamorphosed to become the Nigerian Youth Movement; a political action group with a nationalistic flavor and outlook. Nnamdi Azikiwe, joined the group in 1936.

In 1941 Kofo Abayomi, a Lagos leader of the movement, resigned his position at the Legislative Council, forcing a by-election. A primary election was held among NYM members to select a candidate to contest the seat, in which Samuel Akisanya collated the most votes, with Ikoli in second place. However, with the support of H.O. Davis, Obafemi Awolowo, Akintola and a few others, the party's central committee, which had the right to review the results, chose him as the movement's candidate. Although Akisanya immediately congratulated him, he later reneged and contested the seat as an independent candidate with the support of his primary backer, Nnamdi Azikiwe, although he lost to Ikoli. The loss of Akisanya in the election led to his exit from the movement, Azikiwe also left the movement, both took away most of their supporters. The resulting feud is seen by some analysts as a contributing catalyst to the enmity that exist between the Igbo, Hausa, and Yoruba ethnic groups in the country and also as a major focal point of electoral disputes and the ominous role they played in destabilizing the country.

Although he lost his seat in another by-election in 1946, the result was overturned following a lawsuit and Ikoli regained his membership of the Legislative Council. He ran in the general elections the following year, but withdrew his candidacy shortly before the elections.

In 1951, Ikoli, along with Awolowo and their allies formed the Action Group, which was dedicated to promoting Yoruba interests in the wake of Nigerian Independence. During this time he edited The Daily Service, which voiced the party's agenda. This publication had a moderate leftist bent, which proved unpopular for Western readers, and distracted from the nationalistic message that he was trying to pursue.

== See also ==
- Isaac Adaka Boro
