= H. O. Davies =

Nigerian lawyer and trade unionist (1905–1989)

Chief Hezekiah Oladipo Davies Q.C.
- Born: 5 April 1905; Lagos, Nigeria
- Died: 22 November 1989 (aged 84); Lagos, Nigeria
- Other name: H.O.D.
- Education: Methodist Boys' High School, Lagos; King's College, Lagos; University of London; London School of Economics and Political Science, (BComm, Hons); Middle Temple (Law)
- Occupations: Federal Minister of State (1963–1966); lawyer; journalist; trade unionist
- Notable work: Memoirs, Chief H.O. Davies and Nigeria, The Prospects for Democracy
- Awards: Queen's Counsel (1959); Chevalier de l'Ordre national du Mérite (1973)

Chief Hezekiah Oladipo Davies, Q.C. (5 April 1905 – 22 November 1989) was a leading Nigerian nationalist, founding father, lawyer, journalist, trade unionist, thought leader and politician during the nation's movement towards independence in 1960 and immediately afterwards.

== Family history and early days ==
Chief Davies was born in the southern city of Lagos, Nigeria. His mother was a member of the Agbaje family of Ibadan, his maternal great-grandfather was the Oba of Effon-Alaiye and his maternal great-grandmother was the Owa (Queen regnant) of Ilesha. His grandmother was Princess Haastrup, the daughter of the Ijesha monarch, and his paternal grandfather, Prince Ogunmade-Davies of the Ogunmade Ruling House of Lagos, was the son of King Docemo. His father, known as "Spiritual Moses", was one of the founders of the Cherubim and Seraphim Church of Nigeria.

Between 1911 and 1917, Davies attended the Wesley School, Olowogbowo, Lagos. He went on to Methodist Boys' High School, Lagos, which he attended from 1917 to 1920. In 1921, he began attending the King's College, Lagos, and did so until 1923. In the following year, he became Assistant Master at King's College, Lagos.

Notable among his childhood friends were Nigeria's first president, Dr Nnamdi Azikiwe, who attended Methodist Boys' High School, Lagos with him, and Nigeria's first indigenous Chief Justice of the Federation, Sir Adetokunbo Ademola, and first indigenous surgeon, Dr Oni Akerele, both from King's College.

== Higher education ==
H. O. Davies, or H.O.D., as he was called, was one of the earliest Nigerians to use the University of London's distance learning program, he making friends by way of it with the likes of Lord Denning. He passed the London Matriculation Examination in 1925 in the company of Eyo Ita. He also attended the London School of Economics in 1935, where he was a pupil of Harold Laski, graduating with a BComm (Hons) degree. In the same year, Davies was elected President of the Cosmopolitan Club of the School. While in the United Kingdom, he was President of the West African Student Union and was also a representative of the University of London on the Executive Committee on British Universities. He later returned to London in 1944, where he studied Law and was called to the English Bar at the Middle Temple Inns of Court, London in 1946. In 1959, Davies spent a year as a Fellow of the Center for International Affairs at Harvard University.

== Political career ==
Davies was a founding member of the Lagos Youth Movement in 1934 along with James Churchill Vaughan, Kofo Abayomi, Ernest Sissei Ikoli, and Samuel Akisanya. He was made Secretary-General. The Youth Movement was one of the earliest political associations to encourage active participation by Nigerians in the political and socio-economic development of the country. After returning from studies abroad along with Nnamdi Azikiwe, Davies spearheaded the efforts that led to renaming the Lagos Youth Movement the Nigerian Youth Movement when both individuals became prominent members, contributors and national leaders with large followings. Davies was the founding Secretary-General of the NYM.

Davies left the movement in 1951 and founded his own party, the Nigerian People's Congress. He later joined the National Council of Nigeria and the Cameroons after negotiations for a formidable alliance with Nnamdi Azikiwe were unsuccessful. Davies was a Federal Minister of State in the Ministry of Industries from 1963 to 1966 during the Nigerian First Republic.

== Legal and other professional life ==
Davies was a very successful lawyer, being one of the first two Nigerians (along with Chief Frederick Rotimi Williams) that were honoured with the distinction of Queen's Counsel in 1959. Among his many legal accomplishments, he was the only African lawyer among the legal team that helped defend Jomo Kenyatta, the future president of Kenya, during the famous Mau Mau Uprising case along with Mr. DN Pritt, QC from Britain, Mr. Diwan Chawaanlal from India; and De Sousa and Kapilla, both Indians resident in Kenya. That same year he left for the United States, where he attended the Research Center for International Affairs at Harvard University and wrote the book "Prospects for Democracy". During his time at Harvard, he met with and became friends with future US Secretary of State Henry Kissinger and future US National Security Advisor Zbigniew Brzezinski. Davies led a Nigerian delegation to the Economic Council at the United Nations in 1964, and in September 1974, he was knighted by the French Government as Chevalier de l'Ordre national du Mérite for promoting French-Nigeria relations and for his significant contributions in energising Total Fina Oil and Elf Petroleum, companies of which he was a director.

In 1937, Davies became the Manager of a leading daily newspaper, the Daily Service, and in 1960 he was made the founding chairman and managing director of the then Nigerian National Press, Printers of the Nigerian Morning Post and Sunday Post by the Prime Minister, Sir Abubakar Tafawa Balewa.

Among his several accomplishments, Davies was a national president of the World Peace Through Law, president of the United Nations Organization in Nigeria, chairman of the Rotary Club of Nigeria, and founder and inaugural president of the Nigerian-France Friendship Association.

Prior to his death in 1989, Oloye Davies published an autobiographical book entitled Memoirs.

== Staunch Christian ==
Davies was a Wesleyan and a strong believer that the church should be "militant" in its practicality towards society, not only speaking out in support of the poor, but being actively engaged in ministries involving the poor and actively seeking co-operation among all Christian denominations to effect positive change. He was a key mediator during a fractious period in the history of the Methodist Church of Nigeria, helping to unite disparate factions within the church.
