= Oguntola Sapara =

Nigerian physician (1861–1935)

Chief Oguntola Sapara M.D.
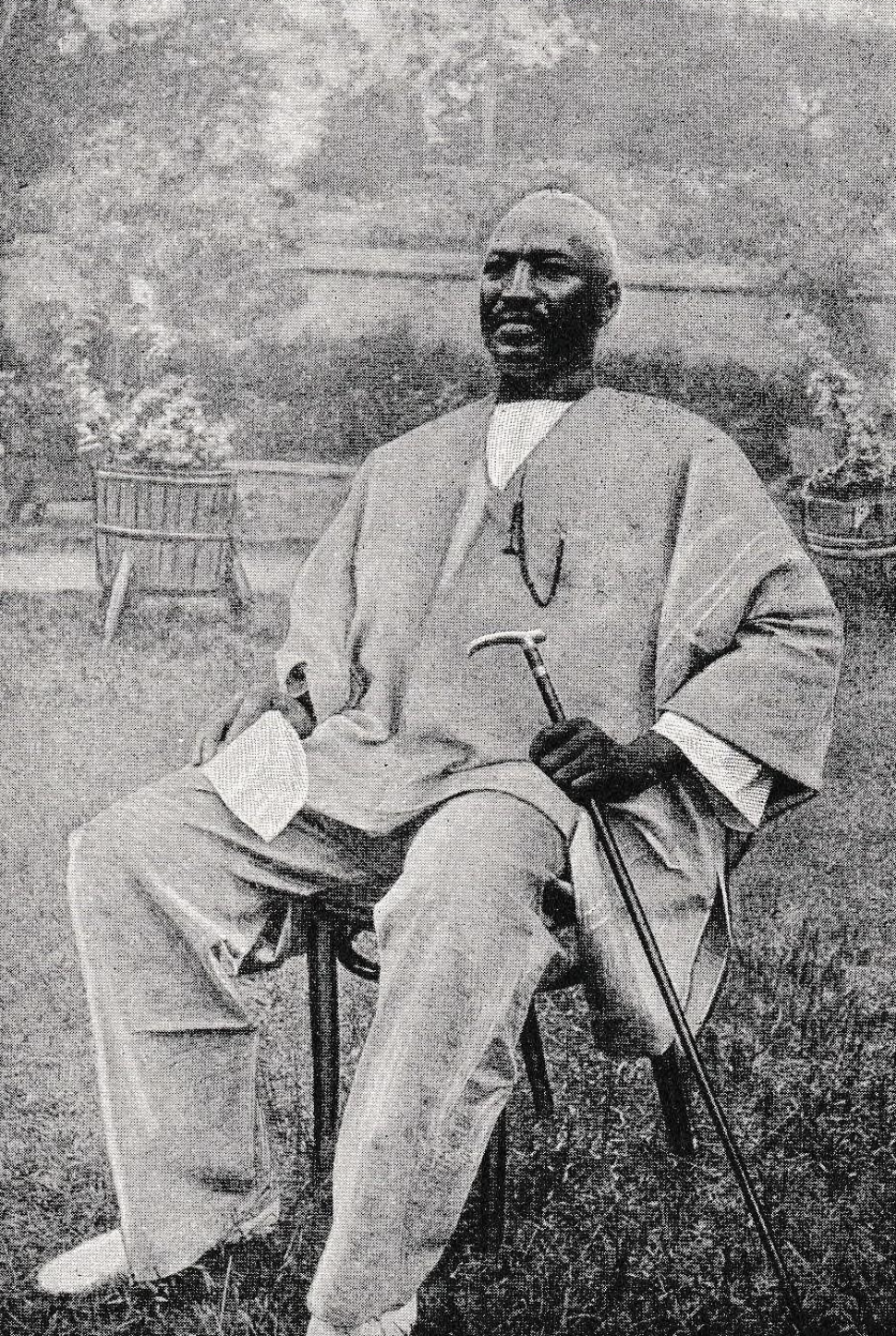
- Born: Alexander Johnson Williams; 9 June 1861; Freetown, Sierra Leone
- Died: June 1935 (aged 73–74); Lagos, Nigeria
- Education: St Thomas's Hospital Medical School
- Occupation: Medical doctor
- Known for: Smallpox prevention

Chief Oguntola Odunbaku Sapara M.D. (9 June 1861 – June 1935) was a Yoruba doctor, originally from Sierra Leone, who spent most of his career and life in Nigeria. He was best known for his campaign against smallpox.

== Early life and education ==
Oguntola Sapara was born in Freetown, Sierra Leone, on 9 June 1861 and named Alexander Johnson Williams. His father was a liberated slave from Ilesa in Western Nigeria, and his mother was from Egbaland.

While in London, Sapara put himself at the disposal of Ida B. Wells during her second anti-lynching campaign in the UK (1894), and joined with her at the home of Mrs P. W. Clayden (wife to editor of The Daily News) to mail out copies of English press coverage of Ida's tour to the US President, statesmen, churchmen and newspaper men of the US. Moving to Scotland, in 1895 Sapara obtained the LRCP and LRCS of the University of Edinburgh, the LFPS of the University of Glasgow and was elected a Fellow of the Royal Institute of Public Health.

== Medical career ==
Sapara returned to the Lagos colony. In January 1896, he was appointed an Assistant Colonial Surgeon. He served continuously in different stations for the next 32 years. He made many contributions to improving public health. He fought for slum clearance, organised a society for scientifically training midwives, organised the first public dispensary in 1901, and identified causes of an epidemic of tuberculosis in 1918, which included overcrowding, poor ventilation and public ignorance about hygiene.

He was Chairman of the Health Week Committee, leading the successful fight against bubonic plague, which struck Lagos in 1924.

In Nigeria at that time, numerous secret societies, such as the "Sopona" cult of the Yoruba people, had power. Sometimes they tried to blackmail people, threatening that if an individual did not pay money, the society would make him become ill and die.

When a victim refused, a member would infect him with smallpox through applying scrapings of the skin rash of smallpox cases. To keep their powers, the societies resisted public health efforts for vaccination. Sapara joined the cult incognito, at considerable personal risk. When he had learned the secret of their power, he helped the government prepare legislation to ban the societies.

In the later part of his career, Sapara ran the Massey Street dispensary, serving most of Lagos. He persuaded the government to convert the dispensary into the Massey Street Hospital, opened by Governor Graeme Thomson in 1926.

Sapara took a special interest in traditional herbal medicines, and spent much time in scientific investigation of their effects. His efforts against some of the cults notwithstanding, he was a keen student of traditional Yoruba culture. He defended it at just about every opportunity.

Sapara retired in 1928. He died in Lagos in June 1935. The famous Jùjú musician Tunde King played at his wake.

== Discrimination and politics ==
As an African, Sapara faced some discrimination. In a report to the Anti-Slavery and Aborigines' Protection Society, Sapara noted that European medical officers were uncomfortable when ranked below African doctors, and in a 1901 conference some had described this as an "indignity". African medical officers were also paid less than their European colleagues. When W. H. Langley, principal medical officer in Nigeria, was asked about expanding the scope of work for African doctors, he responded by attacking their professionalism; in Sapara's case, he brought up the fact that Sapara had allowed clerks to take longer sick leaves than was allowed by government policy.

While visiting London in 1912, Sapara gave financial assistance to the struggling Pan-Africanist African Times and Orient Review published by Dusé Mohamed Ali. Sapara was on the list of invitees from West Africa to the 4th Pan-African Congress, held in New York in 1924, although he may not have attended.

== Recognition and legacy ==
- Sapara received numerous accolades for his great contributions over a 32-year period of service, the longest of any Nigerian colonial surgeon of his time.
- King George V of the United Kingdom awarded Sapara the Imperial Service Order with special reference to his smallpox activities in June 1923.
- Early in 1924, the Owa of Ijeshaland decorated Sapara with the insignia of Bashemi, a chieftaincy title, in recognition of his contributions to medicine.
- The road behind the hospital was named Sapara Avenue in his memory.
- James Churchill Vaughan attempted with little success to organise the fragmentary records of Sapara's work on traditional medicines. He patented some of his discoveries in herbal medicines, which are still marketed today.
- A portrait of the Oloye Sapara by Aina Onabolu hangs in the National Gallery of Modern Art in Lagos.
