= Kofo Abayomi =

Nigerian ophthalmologist and politician

Oloye Sir Kofo Abayomi KBE
- Born: Kofoworola Adekunle Abayomi; 10 July 1896; Colony of Lagos
- Died: 1 January 1979 (aged 82); Lagos, Nigeria
- Occupation: Medical doctor
- Known for: Political activity
- Spouse: Oyinkansola Abayomi

Oloye Sir Kofoworola Adekunle "Kofo" Abayomi, KBE (10 July 1896 – 1 January 1979) was a Nigerian politician who was one of the founders of the nationalist group, the Nigerian Youth Movement, in 1934 and went on to have a distinguished public service career. His last major public assignment was as chairman of the Lagos Executive Development Board from 1958 until 1966.

== Early years ==
Abayomi was born on 10 July 1896 in Lagos of Egbe-Yoruba origin. From 1904 until 1909, he attended UNA School, Lagos and then attended Wesleyan College now known as Methodist Boys' High School, Lagos. He retired early in 1914 to join the staff of the African Hospital, Lagos. During World War 1, he volunteered as a dresser at a main base hospital in the Camerouns. He studied pharmacy at the Yaba Higher College, then attended the Medical School of the University of Edinburgh, graduating in 1928.

He was retained as a demonstrator for a period before he returned to Nigeria to work under Dr. Oguntola Sapara. He returned to the United Kingdom in 1930 to study tropical medicine and hygiene, and again, in 1939, for a postgraduate course in ophthalmic surgery and medicine.

As an African doctor with British training, Abayomi joined the British Colonial Medical Service to make a living.

== Nigerian Youth Movement ==
Abayomi was a founding member of the Nigerian Youth Movement (NYM) in 1933. The NYM was formed by members of the Lagos intelligentsia who were protesting the plan for Yaba College, which they considered would provide inferior education to Africans. Abayomi became President of the NYM on the death of Dr. James Churchill Vaughan in 1937.

Abayomi was elected a member of the Legislative Council in 1938. When he resigned from both positions so he could go abroad for further studies, he precipitated a crisis. Rival candidates were Ernest Ikoli, an Ijo, and Samuel Akisanya, an Ijebu who was supported by Nnamdi Azikiwe. When the executive chose Ikoli as their candidate, both Akisanya and Azikiwe left the party, taking most of their followers with them.

== Later career ==
Abayomi returned to Nigeria in 1941 to continue his successful family practice. He later became the first private practitioner to be elected president of the Nigerian Medical Association. The Egbe Omo Oduduwa, a Yoruba social welfare organization formed in London in 1945, was inaugurated in Ile Ife in June 1948. Sir Adeyemo Alakija was elected president. Abayomi was elected treasurer.

He was a member of the Governor's Executive council from 1949 to 1951.

In 1950, the Alaafin of Oyo, Adeyemi II, gave the Oloye Abayomi the chieftaincy title of One-Isokun of Oyo.

Two years later, in April 1952, Oba Adele II of Lagos gave him the title of Baba Isale.

Abayomi was one of the founding members of the Action Group when that party's Lagos branch was inaugurated on 5 May 1951.

In the first half of 1954, there were several tax riots in the northern Oyo towns. In August of that year, a number of Yoruba chieftains sent him to see the Alaafin of Oyo and try to make him drop support for the nationalist National Council of Nigeria and the Cameroons.

Sir Kofo represented the Nigerian Legislature on the Governing Council of the University College, Ibadan from its foundation in 1948 to 1961. He was appointed Deputy Chairman of the Board of Management of the University College Hospital, Ibadan when it was inaugurated in 1951.

In 1958, he was appointed Chairman of the Lagos Executive Development Board, which had authority to demolish unsanitary buildings and undertake town planning schemes. The board was also involved in freehold housing and estate development in Surulere, North East and South West Ikoyi reclamation schemes and up to one thousand acres reclaimed in Victoria Island.

Abayomi became the first Nigerian Chairman of the Board of the University College Hospital, Ibadan in 1958, a position he held until 1965. In 1959, he was chairman of the Board of Management of the Lagos University Teaching Hospital in Lagos. He served on the board or as chairman of several companies for the rest of his life

Sir Kofo died peacefully at home on 1 January 1979 at the age of 82, leaving behind a widow, Oyinkan, Lady Abayomi, who was herself a prominent figure in the history of Nigeria.
