= Action Group (Nigeria) =

- Chairman: Obafemi Awolowo
- Secretary-General: Anthony Enahoro; Bola Ige
- Founded: 1951
- Dissolved: 16 January 1966
- Headquarters: Ibadan
- Ideology: Social democracy Democratic socialism Awoism
- Political position: Centre-left

The Action Group (AG) was a Nigerian nationalist political party established in Ibadan on 21 March 1951, by Chief Obafemi Awolowo. The party was founded to serve as the platform for realizing his preliminary objective of mobilizing Western Nigerians to forestall the National Council of Nigeria and the Cameroons (NCNC) control of the Western Region and the subsequent aim of cooperating with other nationalist parties to win independence for Nigeria. It benefited immensely from the relationships developed in the Egbe Omo Oduduwa formed in Awolowo's days in London as a student.

== History ==
=== Background ===
In 1941, Obafemi Awolowo nursed the Nigerian Youth Movement in Ibadan, oriented to educated elites. In 1945, Awolowo formed the group Egbe Omo Oduduwa, now to forge Yoruba unity bringing together traditional and educated elites.

Egbe was advertised as a nonpolitical organization for men and women of Yoruba Nationality to build the Yoruba State of Nigeria. The organization gained wide support in Western Nigeria.

In 1950, Macpherson Constitution introduced democratic elections in the country. However, as a cultural organization, Egbe wasn't able to contest elections. The Action Group was formed as a political arm of Egbe.

=== Foundation ===
The Action Group (AG) was established in Ibadan on 21 March 1951 and its public inauguration was held on April 28, 1951, at the historic hall on the hill in Owo in present Ondo State. Representatives from 22 of the 24 administrative divisions of the Western Region participated in the inauguration. Chief Samuel Akinsanya suggested inviting personalities in the Western Region to join the party. Some of the most important chiefs of Western Nigeria participated in a meeting in Ibadan on June 10, 1951, to form the Action Group. However, the meeting was presided by Nigerian doctor Akinola Maja, who wasn't a chief. Egbe's chiefs helped Action Group to get popularity in the region.

=== Elections ===
The party won regional power in Western Nigeria while Nigeria was still under British colonial rule. It took part in the national elections on the eve of Nigerian independence in 1960 but was able to garner little support outside the Western Region and the Nigerian federal capital city of Lagos. A conservative coalition was formed between the northern Muslim-dominated Northern People's Congress and the Igbo National Council of Nigeria and the Cameroons, excluding the Action Group from national power. In the Western Region, the Action Group had launched free primary education and other advances. However, its exclusion from national power, and what some considered a fair share of the national revenue for the Western region, led to internal tensions. Awolowo was arrested on what many considered trumped-up charges of treason, and plotting the overthrow of the federal government. Meanwhile, a pro-government party, the NNDP, was established in power in the Western Region by Chief Samuel Akintola, who left the AG to forge an alliance with the NPC at the center. These tensions and the manipulation of the elections of 1965 were among the factors that led to the 1966 military coups, and the subsequent Nigerian Civil War.

== Ideology ==
The Action Group was a liberal and, later, left-leaning political party which was supported largely by the peoples of the then Western Region of Nigeria. It also had appeal in the later South-South and Middle Belt regions of the country.

Consequently, Chief Awolowo led the party as Leader of the Opposition in the First Republic and the party was renowned for in-depth policy analysis and intense debates on the floor of the Federal Parliament in Lagos. Although pro-socialist, the party was regarded in some establishment circles as supporting Communism, and was viewed with suspicion by the West, even though the leadership denied this claim.

In 1951, the Action Group's ideology was lack of coherence due to the diversity of members. The party promised educational improvements for liberating the Yoruba society from slavery, economic exploitation, and ignorance. Action Group adopted Democratic socialism as its official ideology and defended Federalism as the better form of government in Nigeria in 1959. Members of Action Group also defended the Welfare State due to the belief that it would mitigate poverty, ignorance, and disease.

== In the Second Republic ==
It is often claimed that it was the Egbe Omo Oduduwa that was converted to the Action Group. This is an exaggeration of the connection between the Egbe and the Group; the Egbe continued to exist after the formation of the Action Group as a separate organisation, just as the Ibo State Union was at first separate from the largely Ibo NCNC. Secondly, it is not true that the NCNC "initially" won a majority in the election that brought the AG to power in the West. The situation at the end of the critical election in the West was similar to the one that brought the NPC to power at the national level on the eve of Nigerian independence. Three major parties participated in the election, including an Ibadan communal party. By the end of the election, the AG had won a plurality just like the NPC at the national level. To obtain a majority, the AG entered into negotiations with the Ibadan local party, some of whose members thereafter defected to the AG; the Ibadan party was a separate and independent political organisation, although it had been viewed by the NCNC as its ally.
