= Jibril Martin =

Nigerian lawyer and Muslim community leader

Alhaji Jibril Martin (20 November 1888 - 13 June 1959) was a Nigerian lawyer and educationist who was a member of the Nigerian Legislative Council. He was also chairman of the Hajj Pilgrims’ Board of Nigeria’s Western region, following the independence of Nigeria. He was a prominent member of the Ahmadiyya movement in Nigeria.

== Life ==
Jibril Martin was born in Popo Aguda, the Brazilian quarters on Lagos Island populated by liberated slaves from Brazil. He was born to the family of Haruna Jose Martin and Seliat Remilekun Martin. Martin was educated at the Holy Cross Primary School and St Gregory's College. After his secondary education, he took up appointment with the colonial civil service where he worked from 1907 to 1923. He resigned to study law at University College, London in 1923. Martin qualified as a lawyer in 1926, becoming the second Muslim lawyer in the country after Basil Agusto.

On returning to Nigeria, he became a solicitor but later got involved in politics. He was a member of the Nigerian Youth Movement and was the movement's candidate to represent Lagos in the Legislative Council elections of 1940.

=== Ahmadiyya movement ===
Martin was a member of two Muslim organizations in the 1910s and 1920s: the Juvenile Muslim Society and the Muslim Literary and Debating society. These became the foundation of the Nigerian wing of the Ahmadiyya movement. Martin was attracted to the movement partly because of the movement's positive attitude towards acquiring western education. He later played a prominent role within the local branch. He was vice president of the movement in 1927 and was a member of the first board of trustees. In 1940, he succeeded Saka Tinubu as president. He was an educationist and supported establishment of primary and secondary schools for Muslims in the Western region and the provision of scholarships for students to earn degrees abroad. He was a leader of the Nigerian Bar Association from 1952 to 1959.
