= Nigerian Youth Movement =

Nigerian political party

The Nigerian Youth Movement (NYM) was Nigeria's first genuine nationalist organization, founded in Lagos in 1934 at Stanley Orogun, with Professor Eyo Ita, an Efik/Ibibio man as the founding father and many others, including Samuel L. Akintola, Chief Shonibare, and Chief Bode. Ernest Ikoli, the first editor of the Daily Times of Nigeria, launched in the month of June 1926, was another founding member. The group's immediate concerns included the supposedly inferior status of Yaba College, appointments of Africans to senior positions in the civil service and discriminations against the African truck drivers. However, organization at first, had generally moderate views and pledged to support and co-operate with the governor. The president was Dr Kofo Abayomi. Ernest Ikoli was vice president and H.O. Davies was the secretary. It was the first multi-ethnic organization in Nigeria and its programme was to foster political advancement of the country and enhance the socio-economic status of the Nigerian citizens. Adeyemo Alakija later became President of the NYM.

The movement acquired national outlook and became a strong national movement, when Nnamdi Azikiwe and H.O. Davies returned to Nigeria in 1937 and 1938 respectively and consequently joined the movement . N.Y.M became the first authentic Nigerian nationalist organization to be formed in the country. Obafemi Awolowo and Samuel Akintola were other prominent members of the movement, which membership was opened to all Nigerians, especially those that were residents in Lagos.

== Growing Militancy ==
When Nnamdi Azikiwe launched the West African Pilot in 1937, dedicated to fighting for independence from British colonial rule, the newspaper was an immediate success. Zik, an Igbo man, found a ready-audience among the non-Yoruba people of Nigeria, including many in Lagos state. He introduced Pan-African consciousness to the NYM, and expanded its membership with large numbers of people, who had previously been excluded. H.O. Davies returned to Nigeria in 1938, from a spell at the London School of Economics (LSE), becoming a leading figure in the movement, until he resigned in 1951. At the LSE, Davies had roomed with Jomo Kenyatta and had absorbed the socialist views of Harold Laski.

In October 1938, the NYM won elections for the Lagos Town Council, ending the dominance of Herbert Macaulay and the National Democratic Party. The newly self-confident members of the Nigerian Youth Movement objected to the system of indirect rule through traditional tribal leaders. The Youth Charter published in 1938 said: "We are opposed to the term "Indirect Rule" literally as well as in principle. Honest trusteeship implies direct British Rule with a view to ultimate self-government..." The charter set out goals of unifying the tribes of Nigeria to work towards a common ideal, and educating public opinion to develop the national consciousness needed to reach this ideal. The goal was spelled out as complete autonomy within the British Empire on a basis of equal partnership with the other member states.

== Sources ==
- Coleman, James S. (1971). Nigeria: background to nationalism. University of California Press. ISBN 0-520-02070-7.
- Sklar, Richard L. (2004). Nigerian Political Parties: Power in an Emergent African Nation. Africa World Press. ISBN 1-59221-209-3.
- Uche, Luke Uka (1989). Mass media, people, and politics in Nigeria. Concept Publishing Company. pp. 94–96. ISBN 81-7022-232-X.
