= Tanko Yakasai =

Nigerian politician and activist (born 1925)

Special Assistant to the President of Nigeria on National Assembly Liaison
- In office 1979–1983
- President: Shehu Shagari
- Special Adviser: Kingsley Mbadiwe
- Preceded by: position established

Kano State Commissioner for Finance
- In office 1971–1975
- Governor: Audu Bako
- Preceded by: Umaru Gumel

Kano State Commissioner for Forestry, Community Development and Cooperatives
- In office 1971–1972
- Governor: Audu Bako
- Preceded by: position established
- Succeeded by: Bilyaminu Usman

Kano State Commissioner for Information
- In office 1967–1971
- Governor: Audu Bako
- Preceded by: position established
- Succeeded by: Maitama Sule

Personal details
- Born: Salihu Abubakar Tanko; 5 December 1925 (age 100) Kofar Mata quarters, Kano, Colonial Nigeria
- Party: People's Salvation Party (2001–)
- Other party: Northern Elements Progressive Union (1950–1966); National Party of Nigeria (1978–1983)
- Children: 19 children, including Salihu

Alhaji Salihu Abubakar Tanko Yakasai OFR (born 5 December 1925) is a Nigerian politician and elder statesman. A self-described Marxist-Leninist and a founding member of the Northern Elements Progressive Union, he was a prominent figure in Nigeria's radical political circles in the 1950s and 1960s. He later held various public offices, including State Commissioner in Kano under Military Governor Audu Bako and Special Assistant on National Assembly Liaison to President Shehu Shagari during the Second Republic. He is a founding member of Arewa Consultative Forum.

== Early life and education ==
Salihu Abubakar Tanko Yakasai was born on 5 December 1925 in the Kofar Mata quarters of Kano City, then part of Colonial Nigeria. His father, Abubakar Barau, was of Chamba origin from Adamawa. Hauwa Abubakar, his mother, was a Fulani from Lau, in what is now Taraba State. They met and married in Kano, where they had settled after migrating there. He was given the name Salihu, and was nicknamed 'Tanko'. He spent much of his upbringing in the Yakasai district of Kano, from which he derived his last name.

During his childhood, Tanko was given by his mother to her close friend and neighbour, Yaya Boyi, to be raised, a common practice in Hausa society at the time. At the age of four, his father relocated the family from Kofar Mata to Yakasai, where Tanko began his early Islamic education. From 1933 to 1937, he attended a Qur'anic school located in Yakasai. In 1935, he was also enrolled at Shahuci Primary School in Kano. However, in 1937, before completing his formal education, he moved with his father to Hardawa in Bauchi, where his father was working as a tailor. While in Hardawa, he continued his Islamic studies at another Qur'anic school until 1939. Upon returning to Kano, Tanko resumed his Islamic education in several schools, completing his studies in 1942.

In 1941, he returned to Shahuci Primary School, attending the evening classes and completing in 1946. Between 1952 and 1955, Tanko attended English tutorial classes organised by the British Council in Kano. In 1956, he enrolled in a course on Comparative Federalism through the Extra-Mural Department of the University of Ibadan. Yakasai continued his education in 1963 at the Wilhelm Pieck Youths Higher Institute in the German Democratic Republic, where he earned a diploma in political science.

== Career ==
=== Early career (1941–1947) ===
Yakasai began his professional career as a tailor in 1941. His business grew quickly and he soon began producing school uniforms for schools in Kano, including Kano Middle School.

During this time, Yakasai was mostly focused on expanding his tailoring business. His engagement with politics was initially limited to reading the works of political thinkers such as Sa'adu Zungur, Aminu Kano, Isa Wali, Nuhu Bamalli, and Abubakar Tafawa Balewa. These writings, which frequently appeared in Hausa-language newspapers like Gaskiya Ta Fi Kwabo, often called for Nigerian independence and criticised British colonial rule.

Yakasai's direct involvement in politics began in 1946, following his attendance at a political rally in Kano organised by the National Council of Nigeria and the Cameroons (NCNC). The speakers at the rally included prominent independence activists from Southern Nigeria, such as Herbert Macaulay and Nnamdi Azikiwe. Inspired by their message, Yakasai later described the rally as "the beginning of my interest in politics."

=== Radical politics and the NEPU years (1947–1967) ===
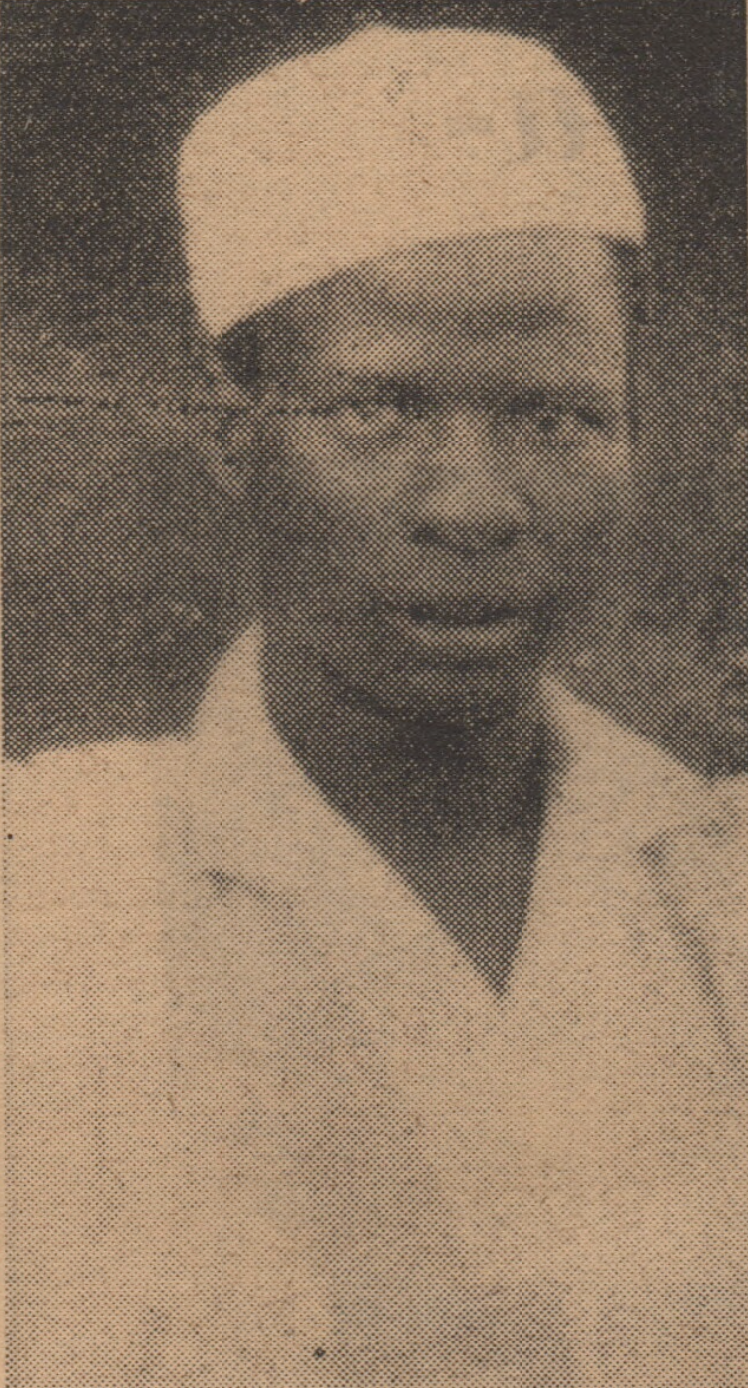
Yakasai in the 1950s

In 1947, inspired by the visit of the NCNC delegation to Kano, Yakasai and several other young men established the Kano Youths Association (KYA). The following year, he joined Jam'iyyar Mutanen Arewa (JMA), a cultural organisation formed by Northern Nigerian intellectuals in 1948. In 1950, a coalition of JMA members and other political activists, including Yakasai, founded a new political party, the Northern Elements Progressive Union (NEPU). By late 1950, NEPU formally severed ties with JMA after the latter refused to engage in political activities. NEPU achieved early electoral success in the Northern Region's September 1951 primary elections, winning 12 out of 26 seats in Kano alone. This rapid success alarmed more conservative members of the Northern Regional Assembly, leading to many politicians to align with the JMA. On 1 October 1951, the JMA transitioned into a political party under the new name Northern People's Congress (NPC).

In the early 1950s, Yakasai co-founded the Askianist Movement with poet Mudi Sipikin and Mustapha Dambatta. Intended to function as NEPU's youth wing within the broader Zikist Movement (or its counterpart), the group was "devoted to disseminating among the youth NEPU's class analysis of Northern Nigeria and especially to inflame the traditional animosity between the Habe stock and the members of the Fulani ruling classes."

Following the 1953 Kano riots, the Askianist Movement became the Positive Action Wing (PAW), initially conceived as a self-defense group against attacks by pro-NPC enforcers known as Jam'iyyar Mahaukata ('Madmen's Party'). Under Yakasai's leadership as national secretary, PAW became increasingly militant and was dissolved in 1954 after it "turned out to be even more violent." It was later reconstituted as Runduna Samarin Sawaba on the advice of Sa'adu Zungur. That same year, Yakasai was appointed Hausa editor of NEPU's party newspaper, the Daily Comet.

Yakasai contested the 1959 federal elections to represent Karaye in the Federal House of Representatives but lost to the NPC candidate, Muhammadu Gwarzo.

In October 1960, Yakasai, then NEPU's publicity secretary, was expelled from the party. He later attributed his dismissal to ideological differences, particularly his advocacy for a Marxist-Leninist orientation incorporating Maoist principles into NEPU's party constitution. This came after an unauthorised tour by Yakasai and others to the Soviet Union, China, and East Germany. After his expulsion, he founded the Sawaba Party of Nigeria (SPN) and formed alliances with the militant Sawaba Party in the Republic of Niger. Yakasai's SPN provided logistical support to Sawabist guerrillas and student cadres, reportedly engaging in arms trafficking to assist their cause.

In July 1965, following a shootout in Kano's Kofar Mata quarters between Sawabist militants and Nigerian authorities, Yakasai was arrested and charged with managing an unlawful society. However, he was released due to lack of evidence, and because the Sawaba Party had not been officially declared illegal in Nigeria at the time of the incident.

Yakasai rejoined NEPU in 1963. He was the secretary of the Kano State Movement, a Kano 'nationalist' organisation formed in July 1965 to push for the province's separation from the Northern Regional Government. Following the collapse of the First Republic, the newly installed military government of Johnson Aguiyi-Ironsi banned all political parties and associations, suspending Yakasai's political career.

=== Kano State commissioner (1967–1975) ===
In 1967, Yakasai was appointed State Commissioner for Information by Audu Bako, the Military Governor of the newly created Kano State. Following a cabinet reshuffle in 1971, Bako reassigned him as State Commissioner for Forestry, Community Development, and Cooperatives. The following year, Yakasai was appointed State Commissioner for Finance after the death of his predecessor, Umaru Gumel.

Following the overthrow of General Yakubu Gowon's administration in 1975, the new Head of State, General Murtala Muhammed, replaced all military governors, including Bako. The newly appointed Military Governor of Kano State, Colonel Sani Bello, initiated a probe into the Bako administration. Assets and properties of senior officials, including Yakasai, were confiscated on allegations of corruption. Yakasai later claimed that the investigation was politically motivated and directed by Murtala Muhammed, who he described as an "NPC supporter", targeting Bako and his associates due to their perceived affiliation with NEPU.

=== National Politics and the Second Republic (1975–1983) ===
In the lead-up to Nigeria's transition from military to civilian rule, Yakasai was among a group of politicians and intellectuals who established the National Movement, an organisation that later evolved into the National Party of Nigeria (NPN). Yakasai was appointed as publicity secretary of the NPN.

During the Second Republic (1979–1983), he served as Special Assistant to President Shehu Shagari on National Assembly Liaison. Yakasai also acted as Shagari's 'proxy' to Aminu Kano, former NEPU president and leader of the opposition People's Redemption Party. Despite leading rival parties, Shagari often consulted Kano on political matters.

=== Later career (1983–present) ===
The Second Republic came to an end following the military coup of December 1983, led by General Muhammadu Buhari. In the aftermath, the National Security Organisation (NSO) arrested several politicians, including Yakasai, who was detained without trial at Kirikiri Maximum Security Prison.

Yakasai was released after General Ibrahim Babangida overthrew Buhari's regime in 1985 and assumed leadership as Head of State. However, he was again arrested in 1986 for engaging in political activities. During General Sani Abacha's regime (1993–1998), Yakasai maintained a "close relationship" with the dictator.

In the early years of the Fourth Republic, Yakasai was among the founding members of the People's Salvation Party, which was headed by another former NEPU politician, Wada Nas. He was a founding member and member of Board of Trustees of the Arewa Consultative Forum (ACF), an influential northern Nigerian socio-political advocacy group.

Over the course of his political career, Yakasai has claimed to have been arrested 14 times by police in Kano alone.

== Personal life ==
Yakasai is married to multiple wives. He has 19 children and over 80 grandchildren. One of his children, Salihu Tanko Yakasai, was the social media aide of the governor of Kano State until he was arrested by Department of State Services at the end of February 2021.

Yakasai published an autobiography titled Tanko Yakasai: The Story of a Humble Life, an autobiography in 2004.

In 2014, the Ganye chiefdom in Adamawa State conferred him with the traditional title of Kauran Ganye.
