= Isa Wali =

Nigerian diplomat (1928–1967)

Alhaji Isa Wali

Nigeria's High Commissioner to Ghana
- In office 17 January 1964 – February 1967
- Prime Minister: Abubakar Tafawa Balewa (1964—1966)
- Heads of State: Nnamdi Azikiwe (1964—1966); Johnson Aguiyi-Ironsi (1966); Yakubu Gowon (1966—1967)
- Preceded by: Kolawole Balogun
- Succeeded by: Gabriel Oyaletor Ijewere

Personal details
- Born: Isa Suleiman Wali; 25 July 1928
- Died: February 19, 1967 (aged 38) Lagos University Teaching Hospital
- Spouse: Zainab
- Children: Major-General Suleiman Wali: Fatima Abdurrahman; Maryam Uwais; Hadiza Wali-Oniyangi
- Parent: Wali Suleiman (father): Maryam Nene (mother)

Isa Wali (1928—19 February 1967) was a Nigerian diplomat who served as the High Commissioner of Nigeria to Ghana. Born in Kano state as the fifth child of Sulaiman, the Wali of Kano, and Hajia Maryam Nene, he was a vocal proponent for women's rights in Northern Nigeria, expressing his views through numerous articles that critiqued what he perceived as the oppressive treatment of women in the region.

== Life ==
Isa Wali belonged to the Gyanawa clan, a Fulani clan renowned for their expertise in Islamic Law. Following his father's death in 1939, Isa was raised by Abubakar na Wali, an Arabic teacher who served as one of the advisors to the emir of Kano. His early education included completing Qur'anic studies by the age of seven, followed by enrollment at Kwaru Primary School to commence his Western education, which he finished in 1940. From 1940 to 1943, he attended the Kano Middle School before furthering his studies at the School for Arabic Studies (SAS) in Kano from 1943 to 1948, where he "was the top student in his class", particularly in the fields of hadith and tafsir.

Upon the completion of his studies at SAS, Isa relocated to Kaduna to work as an interpreter in both the House of Chiefs and the House of Assembly. In 1951, he spent nine months in London to study parliamentary procedure within the House of Commons and the House of Lords. After his return to Kaduna, he served as a clerk assistant to the House of Assembly.

Isa was influential among the new class of western-educated Northern Nigerians. He argued for reforms on the emirate system, and advocated for more opportunities for the talakawa ('commoners') in the Native Authority. Despite his admiration of the culture in the North — favouring it over blindly imitating 'the West' — he strongly advocated for its reform so it did not stay chained to the past. Because of his work as a civil servant, he avoided speaking out publicly about his radical views, however, he actively participated in radical circles. He was very close to his fellow Gyanawa Fulani Aminu Kano, one of the most outspoken radical reformers in Nigeria, and was a fan of the works of Sa'adu Zungur, the influential radical poet and activist.

During his time studying, he became an avid reader of newspapers that focused on 'modern' problems, especially Gaskiya Ta Fi Kwabo and the West African Pilot. During the 1950s, he wrote several articles for these publications, critiquing various aspects of political and religious life in Northern Nigeria, with a particular emphasis on women's rights. He, alongside Aminu Kano, was "virtually alone" in addressing issues concerning women in Northern Nigeria. In the summer of 1956, he wrote a series of articles published in the Nigerian Citizen which kickstarted a wide-ranging debate in Northern Nigeria. In one of these articles, titled "The True Position of Women in Islam", he discussed the appropriate role of Muslim women in public authority:

As for public life, there is nothing in Islam which prevents a woman from following any pursuit she desires. There is no distinct prohibition against her taking part in public leadership — as Aisha the Prophet's widow and her leading women colleagues (the "Mother of Believers") had demonstrated.... Moslem history, in fact, is full of the account of Moslim women in many countries who had been glorious rulers, counsellors, jurists and great public servants. They commanded armies, and, when necessity arose, fought as soldiers as they did in early Islam — before the end of the tenth century.

Partly due to his close relations with Aminu Kano and the publication of these articles, Wali was forced to relocate to Lagos in 1957, where he joined the Foreign Service. Between 1958 and 1961, he represented Nigeria at the United Nations in New York and was in charge of the African Affairs Bureau. In 1964, he was appointed the Nigeria's High Commissioner to Ghana, a position he held until his death from high blood pressure in 1967. His death was received in Ghana "with much public grief and genuine regret" according to his successor, Ambassador Isaac Jemide Sagay, who further claimed that had Isa died in Accra, "Ghanaians would have, without doubt, accorded him something close to a state funeral."

== Legacy ==
In 2009, Maryam Uwais, Isa's daughter, founded the Isa Wali Empowerment Initiative. The initiative aims to primarily help women and children who are economically under-privileged.
