= Tanko (name) =

- Gender: Male
- Language: Hausa

Origin
- Origin: Nigeria
- Meaning: A boy born after several successive girls
- Region of origin: Northern-Nigeria

Tanko is a Nigerian masculine given name and surname of Hausa origin given to a boy born after many girls

== Given name ==
- Tanko Braimah (born 1979), Ghanaian sprinter
- Tanko Dyakov (born 1984), Bulgarian football defender
- Tanko Serafimov (1942–2013), Bulgarian architect
- Tanko Yakasai (born 1925), Nigerian politician and human right activist
- Tanko Zubairu, Nigerian military administrator

== Surname ==
- Abdullahi Tanko (born 1998), Nigerian football striker
- Abubakar Tanko Ayuba (1945–2016), Nigerian politician
- Elemer-György Tanko (born 1968), Romanian skier
- Ibrahim Tanko (born 1977), Ghanaian football forward
- Ibrahim Tanko Muhammad (1953–2025), Nigerian jurist
- J. B. Tanko, Yugoslav-Brazilian filmmaker
- Karim Abdul Razak Tanko (born 1956), Ghanaian football coach and former football midfielder
- Maksim Tanko (born 1994), Belarusian football player
- Mohammed Tanko (born 1988), Ghanaian football player
- Mustapha Amadu Tanko, Ghanaian politician
- Sani Ibrahim Tanko, Nigerian senator
- Umaru Tanko Al-Makura (born 1952), Nigerian businessman and politician

== See also ==
- Tonko
