= Politics of Northern Nigeria =

The government of Northern Nigeria was modelled after the Westminster system. A premier acts as head of government and presides over the day-to-day affairs of government, while a governor acts as head of state and commander-in-chief of the constabulary. The Lower house of parliament, called the House of Assembly, is composed of elected representatives from the various provinces of the country. The Upper house of parliament, called the House of Chiefs, is similar to the British House of Lords. It is composed of unelected emirs of the various Native Authority Councils of the nation's provinces. Before 1963, the Queen of the United Kingdom served as the sovereign of Northern Nigeria.

== Political roots ==
In the period immediately after the world war II, Nigerian politics took a new direction. In 1946 the British colonial administration introduced the Richards Constitution which divided Nigeria into three regions – the North, the West and the East. Nigerian political representation was introduced at the federal and the regional level, and Nigerian political parties were allowed. The dominating political party in Northern Nigeria was the Northern People’s Congress, dominated by the Islamic political elite in the North and widely perceived as a Muslim party. To the Christian communities like the Bachama's and others throughout the Middle Belt the Northern People’s Congress was perceived as the chief political enemy, and Christian dominated parties were founded in the Middle Belt, especially the Middle Zone League and the United Middle Belt Congress which were supported by most Bachama's. To the Christians of northern Nigeria the main political aim of the period was to avoid Muslim domination and to resist what they saw as a long-standing British imperialism and Muslim Fulani sub-imperialism in northern Nigeria.

== Pre-colonial legacy ==
The structure of Northern Nigeria's governments is entwined in the administrative structure of the Sokoto Caliphate, In 1903, the governor of Northern Nigeria, Lord Lugard, guaranteed the administrative structure of the region when he decided to preserve the emirate system of the caliphate; in later structural adjustments the emirates were slowly translated into provinces, some of which became composed of multiple emirates.

== Northern Nigerianism ==
As opposed to Nigerian Nationalism, Northern Nigeria never experienced a phase of nationalism that usually preceded the independence of most African countries, Northern Nigerianism on the other hand was directed against the perceived dominance and influence of the Nigerian South. In the 1940s the Northern Nigerian delegation opted to maintain Nigeria's federal structure and subsequently voted against Independence. In 1952 another rejection of Independence by the North led to attacks on the Northern Delegation to the Lagos conference; News of the attacks led to the 1953 Kano Riots and the famous "mistake of 1914" speech delivered by the sardauna.

In the 1970s organised Northern Nigerian activism slowly led to the emergence of powerful pan-northern interest groups, these groups were however severely decapitated by the sweeping victories of Shehu Yar'adua Peoples Democratic Movement in 1993. since 1999, Northern Nigerianism has continued to suffer electoral setbacks.

== Administrative and political structures ==
=== Emirates ===
The emirs of Northern Nigeria preside over the numerous emirates of the country; their number has gradually grown since the introduction of sub-class emirates in the third and fourth Nigerian Republics. Although constitutionally nominal since the first republic, they continue to be a source of authority and influence throughout Northern Nigeria. In 2014, the selection of Sanusi Lamido Sanusi as Emir Kano led to a four-day standoff purportedly instigated by the president, who was afraid of the influence that Sunusi would garner from the office.

=== Local and state governments ===
Local politics in Northern Nigeria has been plagued by kleptocratic interest groups since the fall of the Northern Central Government. Organized kleptocracies in the form family compact political groups usually rule the Northern Nigerian grass roots. Some have speculated that cultural influence of the Nigerian South could be responsible for the endemic corruption that is plaguing Northern Nigeria's political polity.
