= Tanko =

Tanko may refer to

- Tankō, a type of Japanese armor
- Tankō Bushi, a Japanese folk song
- Tanko (name)
- Tanko (vehicle), Italian term for folk armored vehicles used by Venetian separatists and other groups
