= Aliyu Namangi =

Nigerian Hausa-language poet

- Born: 1894; Mangi, near Zaria
- Died: 1990 (aged 95–96)
- Occupations: Poet, preacher, Islamic scholar
- Writing career
- Language: Hausa
- Genre: Religious poetry
- Notable work: Infiraji
- Notable awards: Honorary doctorate, Ahmadu Bello University

Aliyu Namangi (1894–1990) was a Nigerian Hausa-language poet, preacher and Islamic scholar associated with Zaria. His works include Infiraji, a collection of nine religious poems. He received an honorary doctorate from Ahmadu Bello University.

== Early life and education ==
Namangi was born in 1894. A biographical account published by Katsina Times identifies his birthplace as Mangi, a village near Zaria. It describes his early Qur'anic education under Malam Ibrahim and subsequently Malam Gambo, with whom he moved to Zaria.

His studies extended to Islamic texts and Qur'anic interpretation. According to the same account, he travelled to study with several teachers and relied on memorisation in his learning.

== Poetry ==
Namangi was blind and relied on scribes to record his compositions. His poetry was influenced by his studies of Sufism, asceticism and religious exhortation.

=== Infiraji ===
Infiraji, also rendered as Imfiraaji, comprises nine poems on different subjects. Its title conveys ideas of relief, consolation and salvation. The poems incorporate Arabic expressions and prayers within Hausa verse.

The collection circulated in Hausa Ajami script before Gaskiya Corporation of Zaria transcribed it into the Hausa Latin alphabet and published it in nine volumes. Scribal copying and revisions made by Namangi during recitation contributed to differences between versions.

The first poem, Majidu ("The Glorious"), praises Muhammad and describes his virtues. It recounts the Night Journey and the institution of the five daily prayers. Boston University's commentary also notes Namangi's wish to visit Muhammad's grave in Medina.

The second poem, Gargaɗi ("Warning"), addresses mortality and preparation for the afterlife, encouraging religious observance and the pursuit of knowledge.

=== Other works and poetic form ===
Namangi's other compositions include Kanzil A’azam ("The Greatest Treasure") and Tanbih al-Anām ("A Reminder for Humankind").

His religious praise poem Tsarabar Madina ("A Gift from Madina") uses a metrical pattern he heard in Akilu Aliyu's ‘Yar Gagara. Aliyu had adopted that pattern from a song by Mamman Shata. UCLA's discussion presents the relationship between these works as an example of the exchange between Hausa oral song and written poetry.

Tsarabar Madina is composed in couplets, with the second line of each couplet rhyming in -na.

== Honours ==
Ahmadu Bello University, Zaria, awarded Namangi an honorary doctorate. TRT Afrika also identifies him among Hausa poets who received honorary doctorates.

== Death and subsequent study ==
Namangi died in 1990.

In 2010, Abdalla Uba Adamu recorded Fauziyya Sarki Abubakar reciting the complete nine-part Infiraji collection as part of a project to preserve Hausa musical and poetic performances.

Garba Lawal's 2014 master's thesis at Ahmadu Bello University, Raha a wasu waqoqin Aliyu Namangi, examines humour in selected poems. Its abstract discusses the use of humour for entertainment and to strengthen relationships with relatives within poetry of a religious character.
