= Gambo (name) =

- Gender: Male
- Language: Hausa

Origin
- Origin: Nigeria
- Meaning: A boy born after twins.
- Region of origin: Northern, Nigeria

Gambo is a male-given Hausa name commonly used as a surname in Nigeria. It means "A boy born after twins".

== Notable people with the name include ==
- Gambo Sawaba (1933–2001), Nigerian women's rights activist, politician and philanthropist
- Mohammed Gambo, Nigerian footballer
