= Raji Abdallah =

Nigerian nationalist

Habib Raji Abdllah was a Nigerian nationalist who was General Secretary of the Northern Elements Progressive Association and was president of the Zikist Movement. He was one of the pioneer nationalists from the Northern region of Nigeria.

== Life ==
Abdallah was Ebira and was born in Okene in 1920. His father worked with the colonial authorities as a messenger but later became a judge of the Ebira Native Authority. Abdallah had the privilege of starting primary school within the palace of Attah Ibrahim. He then attended Bida Middle School and Katsina Training College. In 1936, he began work as an announcer for The Post and Telegraph department in Lagos, when rediffusion radio service began in Lagos, Abdallah transferred his services to the new department as a radio announcer in Lagos, he became familiar with the nationalist writings of Nnamdi Azikiwe who had just begun publishing his West African Pilot. In 1940, he was transferred to Kano to work at the Northern region radio rediffusion broadcasting service. His familiarity with Azikiwe's writings especially on discrimination emboldened him to create discussions about nationalism in the North, in addition, he joined a few socio-political organizations in the North of like minded individuals such as Osita Agwuna. In 1946, he co-founded the Northern Elements Progressive Association, an organization with close links to NCNC and he also organized the Kano branch of Zikist Movement, later becoming the association's president. Through NEPA, he sought to raise consciousness about nationalism through public lectures and letters to prominent traditional authorities.

Abdallah's role in the Zikist Movement was critical in keeping the group together for a while as ethnic sentiments created division among members. But a speech by Abdallah then newly appointed president of the movement entitled "What is Zikism?" emphasizing the group's belief in freedom from domination and equality became known to his supervisor who issued him a query for engaging in politics.

Abdallah was later dismissed from his position as wireless coordinator and announcer at Kano Rediffusion Service when his membership of NEPA and Zikist Movement was deemed to be in violation of the code of conduct of civil servants and his defiant response to the query was unsatisfactory to his supervisor.

Upon his departure from colonial service, Abdallah became more active in the Zikist Movement, organizing public lectures and debates about colonialism. He was tried and convicted for sedition in 1949. Upon his release, he joined NCNC but later left the party in 1955. From 1955 to 1966, he was aligned with the Northern People's Congress working at the party's secretariat as party manager.
