= Ghana–Nigeria relations =

- Ghana: Nigeria

Ghana–Nigeria relations are the bilateral diplomatic relations between Ghana and Nigeria. As two major countries in West Africa, the two nations maintain close political, economic, and cultural ties.

Ghana and Nigeria were both formerly colonies of the United Kingdom in British West Africa and are members of the Commonwealth of Nations, with English as their official language. Both countries are also members of international organisations such as the Economic Community of West African States (ECOWAS), the African Union, and the United Nations, cooperating to promote regional integration and collaboration.

== History ==
=== Colonial ===
The colonial era increased the relationship between both countries. Both Nigeria and Ghana were colonised by the British Empire. This colonisation gave the countries, which share no common language, a means of communication. This era also brought some Nigerians to Ghana. During the colonial era, descendants of Nigerian Hausas were brought to the Gold Coast, what is now Ghana, to fight under the British flag in an attempt to destroy one of the last holdouts against British rule in West Africa, the Ashanti Empire. They were called Glover Hausas and contributed to the foundations of the Gold Coast's colonial army.

=== Post-colonial ===
Many Nigerians began moving to Ghana after Ghana became the first independent country in the region in 1957. Also in the late 1970s, many Ghanaians moved to Nigeria as economic migrants. The relationship became sour for various reasons. Thus, under former Ghanaian prime minister Kofi Abrefa Busia's Aliens Compliance Order, Nigerians among other immigrants were forced to leave Ghana as they made up a significant percentage of Ghana's large undocumented population. The official reason for deportation was failing to comply with the immigration laws of the country.

In 1983, Nigeria retaliated and deported up to 1 million Ghanaian and other African immigrants when Ghana was facing severe drought and economic problems. This further strained relations between the two countries. In April 1988, a joint commission for cooperation was established between Ghana and Nigeria. A bloodless coup in August 1985 had brought Major General Ibrahim Babangida to power in Nigeria, and Rawlings, the leader of Ghana at the time, took advantage of the change of administration to pay an official visit. The two leaders discussed a wide range of issues focusing on peace and prosperity within West Africa, bilateral trade, and the transition to democracy in both countries. In early January 1989, Babangida reciprocated with an official visit to Ghana, which the PNDC hailed as a watershed in Ghana–Nigeria relations.

Subsequent setbacks that Babangida initiated in the democratic transition process in Nigeria clearly disappointed Accra. Nonetheless, the political crisis that followed Babangida's annulment of the results of the June 1993 Nigerian presidential election and Babangida's resignation from the army and presidency two months later did not significantly alter the existing close relations between Ghana and Nigeria, two of the most important members of ECOWAS. After the takeover in November 1993 by General Sani Abacha as the new Nigerian head of state Nigeria continued to consult Ghana on economic, political, and security issues affecting the two countries and West Africa as a whole. Between early August 1994 when Ghanaian President Jerry Rawlings became ECOWAS chairman and the end of the following October, the Ghanaian president visited Nigeria three times to discuss the peace process in Liberia and measures to restore democracy in that country.

=== Contemporary relations ===
Relations between the two countries temporarily deteriorated due to trade disputes surrounding Ghana's foreign retail regulations and the 2020 demolition of a building located within the premises of the Nigerian diplomatic mission by Ghanaian authorities. However, both governments subsequently pursued the restoration of relations through diplomatic dialogue. In 2024, the Government of Ghana reconstructed the demolished building within the grounds of the Nigerian High Commission residence and formally handed it over to the Nigerian side, a gesture widely regarded as a symbol of friendship and cooperation between the two countries.

The two countries have also expanded cooperation in the field of education. In 2024, a delegation from the Ghana Education Service visited Nigeria to participate in a South-South and Triangular Cooperation (SSTC) program supported by the Korea International Cooperation Agency (KOICA), where participants shared experiences regarding ICT-based STEM education policies and institutional development.

Cooperation has also developed in the energy sector. In 2024, the Nigerian Content Development and Monitoring Board (NCDMB) and the Petroleum Commission of Ghana launched a technical cooperation program aimed at strengthening local content policies and capacity development.

The two countries also support regional integration and security cooperation within the framework of the Economic Community of West African States (ECOWAS) and continue to work together in addressing political and security challenges facing West Africa.

== Cultural relations ==
Ghana and Nigeria maintain close cultural relations based on their shared colonial history and extensive people-to-people exchanges as two leading English-speaking countries in West Africa. Both nations are members of the Economic Community of West African States (ECOWAS), which has promoted the free movement of people and cultural exchanges within the region. Scholars have identified cultural interaction between Ghana and Nigeria as an important factor contributing to regional integration in West Africa.

The film industry is one of the most prominent examples of cultural exchange between the two countries. Nigeria's film industry, Nollywood, enjoys significant popularity in Ghana, while numerous Ghanaian actors have appeared in Nigerian films, contributing to increased cooperation between the two film industries. Filmmakers from both countries have also engaged in joint production projects, and such cooperation has been regarded as a factor promoting the integration of the West African popular culture market.

The influence between the two countries is also notable in the field of music. Nigeria's Afrobeats and Ghana's Highlife have developed through mutual influence, while collaborations between musicians from both countries have contributed to the international spread of West African popular music. Researchers have described such exchanges in the cultural industries as important soft-power assets in Ghana–Nigeria relations.

Ongoing migration and people-to-people exchanges between Ghana and Nigeria have also strengthened cultural similarities. Both countries use English as an official language and share many common features in religion, education, and popular culture. The Nigerian community in Ghana and the Ghanaian community in Nigeria play important roles in facilitating cultural transmission and promoting mutual understanding between the two societies.

== Economic relations ==
Ghana and Nigeria are both members of the Economic Community of West African States (ECOWAS) and participate in efforts to promote regional economic integration and trade liberalization.

Both countries support the expansion of intra-African trade through the African Continental Free Trade Area (AfCFTA). The AfCFTA Secretariat is headquartered in Accra, Ghana, while Nigeria ratified the agreement in 2020 and subsequently joined the free trade area.

Economic relations have at times been affected by trade disputes. Between 2019 and 2020, Ghanaian authorities closed a number of shops owned by Nigerian traders under Ghana's retail trade regulations. The Nigerian government and traders' associations argued that the closures violated ECOWAS principles on regional free trade and freedom of establishment.

Following the dispute, the governments of both countries engaged in diplomatic consultations aimed at easing trade tensions and strengthening economic cooperation.

== See also ==
- Foreign relations of Ghana
- Foreign relations of Nigeria
- Nigerian High Commission in Ghana
