= Maitama Sule =

Nigerian politician (1929–2017)

The Honourable Yusuf Maitama Sule Dan Masanin Kano, CFR
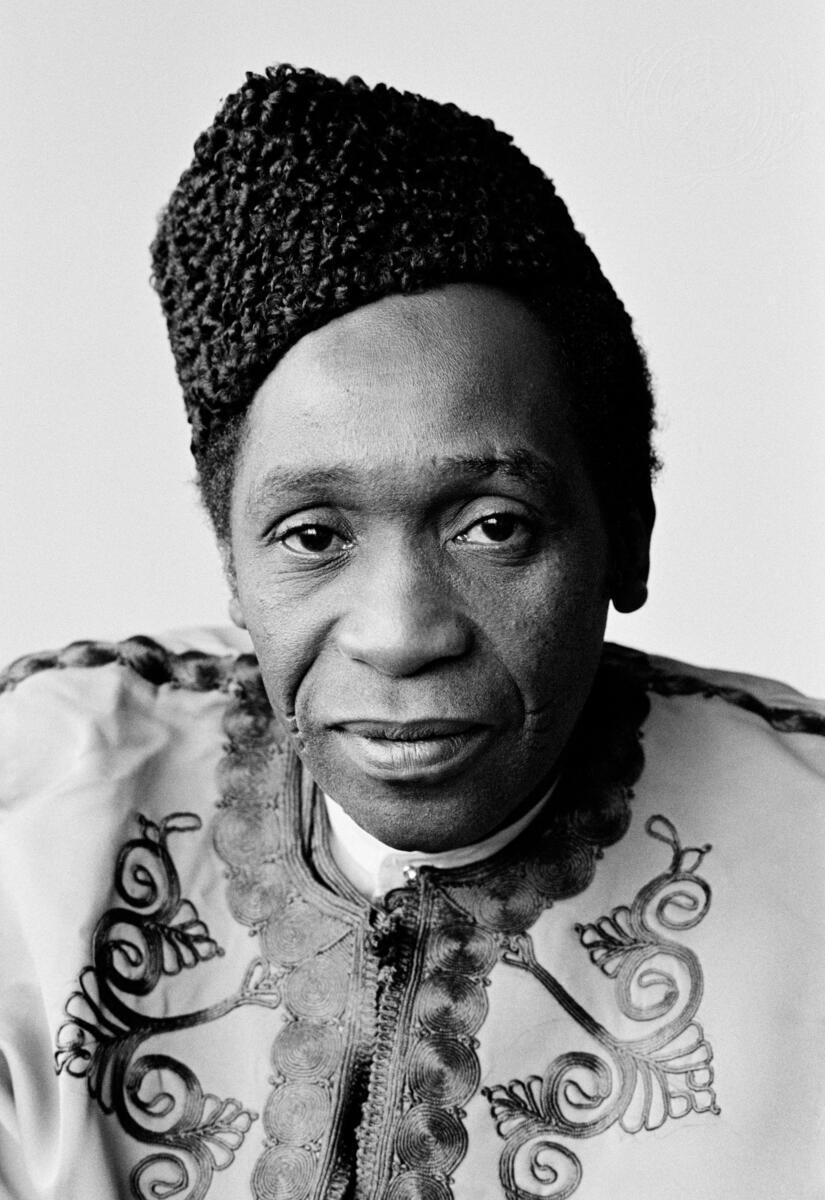
- Taken in 1981

Permanent Representative of Nigeria to the United Nations
- In office 1979–1983
- Appointed by: Shehu Shagari
- Succeeded by: Joseph Nanven Garba
Ministerial offices
Minister for National Guidance
In office 1983–1984
Preceded by	"Position established"
Succeeded by	"Position abolished"
Federal Minister of Mines and Power
In office 1955 – April 1965
Prime Minister	Abubakar Tafawa Balewa
Preceded by	Muhammadu Ribadu
Succeeded by	Prince Alade Lamuye
Commissions held: 1967–‍1979
Chief Commissioner for Public Complaints
In office 3 October 1975 – 1979
Preceded by	position established
Succeeded by	position abolished
Kano State Commissioner for Information and Cultural Affairs
In office 1972 – 3 October 1975
Governor	Audu Bako
Preceded by	Tanko Yakasai
Kano State Commissioner for Local Government
In office 1967–1972
Governor	Audu Bako
Preceded by	position established
Succeeded by	position abolished
Parliamentary offices: 1954–‍1966
Member of Parliament in the House of Representatives from Kano
In office 1959 – 15 January 1966
Preceded by	position established
Succeeded by	position abolished
Constituency	Dawakin Tofa West
Government Chief Whip
In office 1954–1956
Member of Parliament in the House of Representatives from Kano
In office 1954–1959
Succeeded by	position abolished
Constituency	Kano Urban Area

Personal details
- Born: 1 October 1929 Yola quarters, Kano, Northern Region, Colonial Nigeria (now in Kano State)
- Died: 3 July 2017 (aged 87) Cairo, Egypt; Funeral Kano emir's palace
- Resting place: Kara graveyard
- Party: National Party of Nigeria
- Other political affiliations: Northern People's Congress; Northern Elements Progressive Union
- Children: 10
- Occupation: Legislature
- Profession: Politician, diplomat, businessman, farmer, teacher

Yusuf Maitama Sule CFR CFR (1 October 1929 – 3 July 2017), known by his title Dan Masani of Kano, was a traditionalist Nigerian statesman and diplomat who was one of the foremost politicians from northern Nigeria between the independence period and early republic in the 1960s. He served as the first and only federal minister for national guidance, in which role he sought to bring into being an ethical revolution within the country.

In 1955-1956 he was the chief whip of the Federal House of Representatives. In 1960 he led the Nigerian delegation to the Conference of Independent African States. In 1976, he became the Federal Commissioner of public complaints, a position that made him the nation's pioneer ombudsman. In early 1979, he was the presidential candidate of the National Party of Nigeria but lost to Shehu Shagari. He was appointed Nigeria's representative to the United Nations after the coming of civilian rule in September 1979. While there he was chairman of the United Nations Special Committee against Apartheid.

After the re-election of President Shagari in 1983, Maitama Sule was made the Minister for National Guidance, a portfolio designed to assist the president in tackling corruption.

== Career ==
=== Public Complaints Commission ===
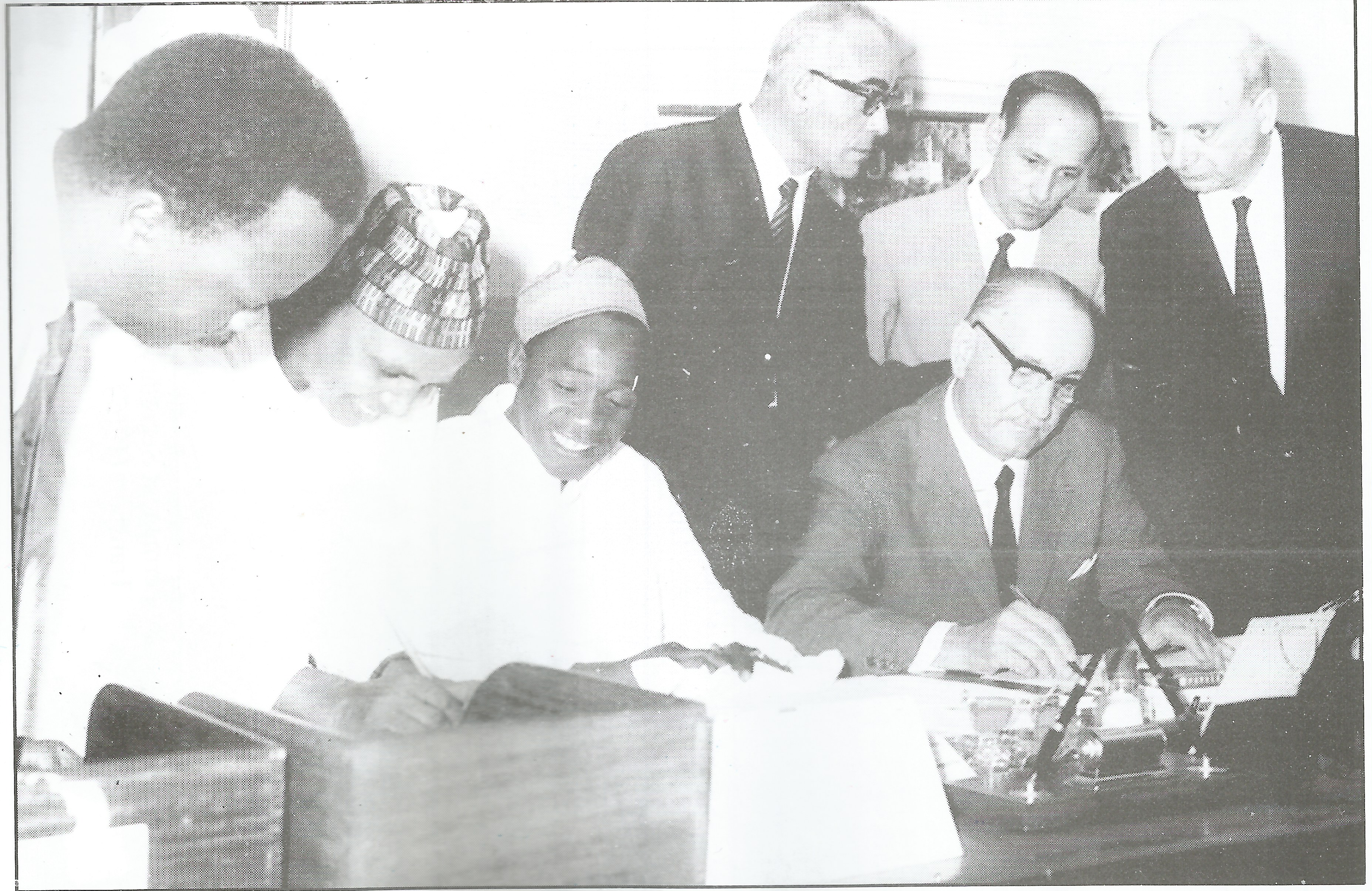
Sule (third from left), as Minister of Mines and Power, looks on as the Ministry's Permanent Secretary, Musa Daggash, signs a petroleum exploration agreement with representatives from Agip Petroleum Company (April 1963)

The rise of economic nationalism during the 1970s led to the enactment of a decree stipulating minimum requirements for local content in many companies doing business in Nigeria. To capitalize on the benefits of indigenous control of the economy, many permanent secretaries, federal commissioners, state governors and their cronies established firms to conduct business with the government. It was with the intent of patching the revolving door and to stem small-time corruption that the Public Complaints Commission was created in 1975. It was meant to hear and tackle complaints by the common man in a simple and efficient manner. Sule, as head of the commission, was known to have taken his job seriously, partly because he was a potent political commodity and had a lot to gain from the good will of the people when a transition to civilian rule was in place. As a result of the commission's effort, corruption during the period was temporarily curtailed.

=== National guidance ===
In 1983, Sule returned to a familiar role, this time under a democratic government as the head of a ministry to tackle corruption. The new but short-lived ministry was created solely to invest time in an ethical re-orientation of Nigerians. Sule, who had acquired a solid reputation as a tough U.N representative when he was chairman of a U.N. special committee on apartheid, was asked to lead the ministry. However, his appointment was not satisfactory to critics. Shagari's administration was removed by a coup, with the coupists citing corruption as a major reason for the incursion.

== Polemical statement ==
Alhaji Yusuf Maitama Sule said,

Everyone has a gift from God. The Northerners are endowed by God with leadership qualities. The Yoruba man knows how to earn a living and has diplomatic qualities. The igbo man is gifted in trade, commerce, and technological innovation. God so created us equally with purpose and different gifts.

The aforementioned statement has been used by some to stir up fears of northern political domination in the country. The fear of northern dominance can however not be dismissed.

"May God give this country leaders not rulers, leaders with the fear of God."

"The former minister said: “The present-day leadership wants money. You can’t have money and honour at the same time. Our former leaders didn’t want money, they wanted to serve the country, and that is why they were respected.” Read more: https://www.legit.ng/1113234-11-major-comments-maitama-sule-lived.html"

== Death ==
Sule died on 2 July 2017 in a hospital in Cairo, Egypt, after suffering from pneumonia and a chest infection.
