= Wada Nas =

Nigerian politician (1938–2005)

Special Adviser on Special Duties
- In office November 1997 – 1 July 1998 Serving with Lazarus Unaogu, Wole Oyelese
- President: Sani Abacha; Abdulsalami Abubakar
- Preceded by: position established
- Succeeded by: position abolished

Minister with Special Duties
- In office 1995 – November 1997 Serving with Lazarus Unaogu, Wole Oyelese
- President: Sani Abacha
- Preceded by: position established
- Succeeded by: position abolished

Minister of State for Education
- In office 1993 – February 1995
- President: Sani Abacha
- Minister: Iyorchia Ayu
- Succeeded by: Iyabo Anisulowo

Member of Parliament for Kankara-Kogo
- In office 1959–1964
- Preceded by: position established
- Succeeded by: Abdullahi Inde

Personal details
- Born: Wadata Nasarawa; 1938 Funtua, Katsina Province, Colonial Nigeria
- Died: January 3, 2005 (aged 66–67)
- Party: People's Salvation Party
- Other party: Northern Elements Progressive Union; National Party of Nigeria; National Republican Convention
- Spouse: 2
- Children: 20
- Occupation: politician, columnist, businessman

Wada Nas (1938 – 3 January 2005) was a Nigerian politician. He was one of eight members of the Northern Elements Progressive Union to serve in the Federal Parliament during the Nigerian First Republic and later aligned with the National Party of Nigeria (NPN) during the Second Republic. He rose to national prominence as a minister in Sani Abacha's military government, notably as one of the dictator's three Ministers with Special Duties, becoming known as a staunch defender and chief propagandist for the regime.

== Early life ==
Wadata Nasarawa was born in 1938 at Nasarawa quarters of Funtua in the Katsina Province of Colonial Nigeria. He was the youngest of twelve children born to his father Mallam Ibrahim. He was named 'Wada' by his aunt, a name derived from the Hausa word 'Wadata' (abundance) as his naming ceremony was marked by the sacrifice of four rams, one from his father, two from the Waziri of Katsina, and one from Muhammadu Dikko, the Emir of Katsina. He was orphaned at a young age, losing his father when he was two and his mother, Amina, four years later. Nas was raised by his elder brother, Garba Nasarawa.

Nas began his education at an elementary school in Funtua, attending from 1945 to 1949. He later enrolled at Katsina Middle School and, upon graduating in 1954, proceeded to Katsina Teachers College (KTC). During his time at KTC, he developed an interest in politics and became an admirer of Aminu Kano and his socialist Northern Elements Progressive Union (NEPU). He wrote to Kano expressing his interest in joining NEPU, to which Kano responded by encouraging him to first complete his studies.

== Career ==
In 1958, after graduating from KTC, Nas was posted to Dutsinma in Katsina Province as a schoolteacher. Before relocating, he formally joined NEPU. He was later transferred to Kaita, another town in the province, where he reportedly engaged in political activities on behalf of NEPU. His efforts in political campaigning eventually led to his appointment as the publicity secretary of NEPU in the province. He was later transferred again, this time to Kankara.

In the 1959 general election, Nas contested for a seat in the Federal Parliament. NEPU initially selected him to run in his hometown of Funtua. However, he reportedly requested to contest in the Kankara/Kogo constituency instead, believing that internal divisions within the local branch of the Northern People's Congress (NPC) gave him a better chance to win. He ran against Hassan Rafindadi, the Sarkin Yaki of Katsina and the NPC candidate. Nas was among the eight NEPU candidates who won seats in the Federal House of Assembly, where he served as its youngest member. He sought re-election in 1964 but he lost to Abdullahi Othman Inde of the NPC.

Following the January 1966 coup, which marked the end of Nigeria's First Republic, Nas returned to Funtua and took up farming. During the Second Republic, he re-entered politics as a member of the ruling National Party of Nigeria (NPN). However, with the return of military rule after the 1983 coup, he once went back to farming.

=== Abacha's regime ===
With the return of partisan politics following the Ibrahim Babangida military regime, Nas joined the National Republican Convention (NRC) and was appointed the Katsina State chairman of the party. He was a vocal critic of the controversial 12 June 1993 presidential election, in which the Social Democratic Party (SDP) candidate, M.K.O. Abiola, emerged as the winner. The election crisis eventually took on an ethno-regionalist dimension, with opposition largely divided between conservative politicians from the North and East on one side and mostly Yoruba politicians from the West on the other. Nas supported the annulment of the election by Babangida, warning that "once we revisit 12 June, that will be the end of the country." In an attempt to ease tensions, Babangida relinquished power and established the Interim National Government (ING) under Ernest Shonekan.

In November 1993, General Sani Abacha staged a coup d'état against the ING and assumed power. Initially serving as Minister of State for Education, Nas was appointed one of Abacha's three Ministers with Special Duties in early 1995. According to journalist Chris McGreal, these positions were created as "a euphemism for dealing with the opposition." Nas became known for publicly defending the actions of the Abacha government and was described by critics as the administration's chief propagandist. His tenure in the role was also marked by efforts to mobilise regional, religious, and ethnic sentiments, "both to galvanise support for the regime and to intimidate, harass or weaken perceived opponents of the regime."

In 1995, following the execution of writer Ken Saro-Wiwa and eight other Ogoni activists by the military government, Nas defended the administration's actions, accusing foreign governments of supporting insurgency. The following year, he criticised Amnesty International as 'troublemakers,' after three of its staff members were arrested while en route to a reception hosted by U.S. ambassador Walter Carrington.

In September 1997, when heavily armed soldiers dispersed Carrington's farewell party, which was held in his honour as he concluded his tenure as U.S. ambassador to Nigeria, Nas blamed Carrington for the incident. He remarked that the ambassador's tenure had been "four years of waste during which nothing was accomplished between the two countries in economic, cultural, or political terms."

Nas sponsored the founding of the Democratic Party of Nigeria (DPN), one of the five political parties established under Abacha's transition program. Like the other parties, the DPN endorsed Abacha as its candidate for the planned 1998 presidential election, a move Nas defended as reflecting "the wish of Nigerians." Abacha died two months before the election was scheduled to take place.

During the Abacha-era, the Nigerian press gave Nas several pejorative nicknames, including 'Wada Noise', 'Wada Nasty', 'Wada Nonsense', and 'Wada NADECO', the last being a reference to the pro-democracy coalition National Democratic Coalition (NADECO), which opposed the military regime.

=== Fourth Republic ===
Following the death of Abacha, General Abdulsalami Abubakar succeeded him and initiated Nigeria's transition to democracy. On 1 July 1998, Nas, along with his colleagues Wole Oyelese and Lazarus Unaogu, was sacked.

In the Nigerian Fourth Republic, Nas founded the People's Salvation Party. He was a staunch supporter of General Muhammadu Buhari and endorsed his presidential candidacy. He was also a member of The Buhari Organisation (TBO), a political group formed to support Buhari's bid for the presidency.

Nas became a vocal critic of President Olusegun Obasanjo through his writings. He accused Obasanjo of implementing a hidden pro-Yoruba agenda and alleged that Yoruba political leaders were deliberately marginalising northern Nigeria while favouring Yoruba and Christian appointees.

In 1999, following a violent attack on mostly Hausa northerners in Lagos by the Yoruba nationalist group Oodua Peoples Congress (OPC), Nas blamed Obasanjo for failing to take action against the OPC. He warned that "the north would not sit idly and watch its people being killed in the south west...Northerners would retaliate if the authorities failed to protect their people in the south west and punish the offenders."

Nas had two wives and twenty children. He died on 3 January 2005.
