= Akilu Aliyu =

Aliyu aqilu

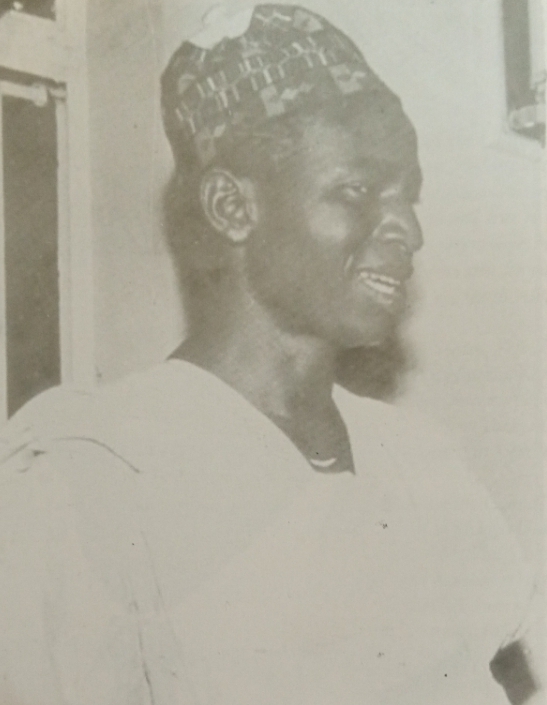

Alhaji Dr. Aliyu Akilu M.F.R (1918 – October 19, 1999) also known as Malam Akilu Aliyu or Aqilu Aliyu was a Nigerian poet, writer, scholar, politician and one of the greatest Hausa poets of the twentieth century.

== Biography ==
Akliu Aliyu was born in Jega (in a town called Kyarmi, in present-day Kebbi State. Malam Akilu spent most of his life in Kano, a place he went as an Islamic student in his teens. He was in Maiduguri for a few decades before returning to Kano where he lived till his death. He lived as an Islamic teacher, a tailor and a poet (poetry was a medium through which he taught thousands of invisible students). He established, and taught in, Islamic schools in Maiduguri and Azare.

== Education ==
For his early education, he was trained in a Quranic school in Kano, under the Tijaniyya brotherhood, and later went to Borno to study under prominent Islamic scholars from the northeastern part of the country. He was an erudite poet who wrote in Hausa and Arabic, and his recitals drew great acclaim among many Hausa speakers. He started writing Arabic poems in the 1930s.

Malam Akilu's aptitude in poetry began to show while he was only a teenager. In an interview with Radio Nigeria, Kaduna in 1966, the poet said that he started composing in Arabic even before venturing into Hausa poetry. As at then, he said in the interview, he had over seven hundred poems to his credit some of which had up to 300 verses. In fact, he composed one with a thousand verses!

== Works ==
The poet was most revered by fellow Hausa literati who considered him a senior for his exceptional poetic power. Professor Neil Skinner, the renown Hausa scholar, in his book, An Anthology of Hausa Literature, described Malam Akilu as "vigorous and highly productive poet." Sheikh Na’ibi Suleiman Wali, an Islamic scholar and excellent bilingual poet (Arabic and Hausa), called the late poet a fasihi; a Hausanised Arabic word meaning ‘talented’. Alhaji Mudi Sipikin also held the poet in high esteem. When Alhaji Shehu Shagari was in power (he is also a poet, remember Wakar Nijeriya), he invited fellow Hausa poets to Argungu and honoured them and of course Malam Akilu was among them. Malam Akilu was also a recipient of a national honour as well as an honorary doctorate degree from Bayero University, Kano. Hamisu Muhammad Gumel said "there could hardly be a Hausa poet with greater patriotic zeal and sense of belonging."

Another thing that further earned the poet respect was his acceptance of modernity. This could be seen in the flexibility of his poetry which touches almost all spheres of human existence like religion, occupation, leisure, nature, education, et cetera. One of the topics that attracted Malam Akilu's attention most was education. In fact some verses from his famous poem, "Kadaura Babbar Inuwa", serve as the signature tune for VOA Hausa Service’s educational program, "Ilimi Garkuwar Dan’adam". In that same poem he encouraged the youth to be engaged in professions like medicine, law, teaching, journalism, banking and others.

"Wannan dai shine hoto na

Wanda idonku yake kallo na

Bayan na tafi gun Sarkina

Za ku tuna ni watan wata rana

Ko wani ya yi kiran sunana

Sai ku cane Allah ya jikaina

Ya Allah sa ku yi juyayina

Har ku yi min addu’a bayana;

Amin na roke ku zumaina

Allah dai ya cikan fatana."

The above poetic lines were what Akilu Aliyu, wrote under his photograph in Fasaha Akiliya, a collection of some of his poems whose contribution to Hausa poetry in quantity and quality, to the best of this writer's knowledge, is yet to be surpassed.

=== Popular Songs Include ===
- Matan Aure
- Dan Gata
- 'Yar Gagara
- Hausa Mai Ban Haushi
- Maza mamugunta
- Wakar Najeriya
- Cuta ba mutuwa ba
