= Abdul Karim Disu =

Nigerian journalist

Abdul Karim Disu (October 10, 1912 – 2000) was a Nigerian journalist, and the first Nigerian to earn a post-graduate degree in journalism when he attended Columbia University in 1944. Disu originated from Isale-Eko, Lagos and was a close friend of Nnamdi Azikiwe, the first President of Nigeria.

He attended King's College, Lagos and finished his education there in 1931. in 1943, with a B.A. in journalism from the University of Wisconsin, he obtained a M.Sc. degree in Journalism in Columbia University.

He worked as a clerk with Nigerian Marine in the Old Marine Department from 1931 to 1938. He also worked in the United Nations Secretariat Documents and Trusteeship Department from 1947 to 1948 and became an Associate Editor of the West African Pilot in 1955.

After his stint at the pilot, he became the General Manager and Chairman of the Eastern Nigeria Information Service. In 1960, he became the Press Secretary to the Governor-General of Nigeria. He was promoted to the post of Principal Secretary to the Governor General in 1961 and held the position till 1963.In 1963, he became Secretary to the President of the Federal Republic of Nigeria. In 1968, he was appointed the Public Relations Officer to the National Commission for Rehabilitation by the Federal Military Government and he held the position till his retirement in 1971. Upon his retirement, he was appointed a board member on several private companies until his death.

He married an Nnewi woman, Rose Asomugha, from Anambra State, and a veteran journalist, Chief Melie Chukelu Kafu Ajuluchukwu (1924-2003), was best man during their wedding.

He died in 2000 and his wife, Rose Asomugha, died in 2003.

He received a Post Humous Recognition for his "Selfless and Dedicated Service to the Isale Eko Descendants' Union" by the Isale Eko Descendants Union on Isale Eko Day in December 2019.
