= Saudatu Mahdi =

Nigerian Women's Right advocate (born 1957)

MFR Saudatu Mahdi
- Born: Saudatu; 20 April 1957 (age 69); Katsina State
- Education: Ahmadu Bello University, Zaria
- Occupations: Women’s Rights Advancement and Protection Alternative (WRAPA) - Secretary General
- Known for: Advocacy, Development, Women's Rights
- Notable work: Bring Back Our Girls

Saudatu Mahdi (born 20 April 1957) is a Nigerian women's rights advocate. She is the Secretary General of Women's Rights Advancement and Protection Alternative (WRAPA). She has published over 20 books focusing on violence against women, women’s rights, Shari’a and women and women in education. Mahdi led the team that fought and won the acquittal for a Nigerian woman who was sentenced to death by hanging because she had a child out of wedlock.

== Early life ==
Mahdi was born on 20 April 1957 in Katsina State, Nigeria. In 1964, young Mahdi was sent to Kaduna Central Primary School, Kaduna and later St. Louis Primary School, Kano where she spent few years before leaving for Sacred Heart Primary School, Kaduna. In 1970, she proceeded to Queen Amina College in Kaduna.

== Education ==
In 1978, she obtained her first degree from Ahmadu Bello University, Zaria and in 1992, she proceeded to the Administrative Staff College of Nigeria (ASCON) for a post graduate programme. She has several certificates in various fields such as in entrepreneurship, fiscal and financial management, human rights, advocacy and institution building. Mahdi is a fellow of the Institute of Corporate Administration in Nigeria.

== Career ==
She started her career as a classroom teacher before resigning. In August 1989, she became the principal of the Government Girls Secondary School in Bauchi. On 12 April 1995, she was appointed Acting Registrar of the Abubakar Tatari Ali Polytechnic, Bauchi and held the position till 11 November 1998 before she voluntarily retired. She is currently the Secretary General of Women's Rights Advancement and Protection Alternative (WRAPA).

== Advocacy ==
Mahdi is one of the co-conveners of Bring Back Our Girls Advocacy Group in Nigeria. Mahdi worked with Nigeria’s former Minister of Education, Obiageli Ezekwesili; the Director General of Nigeria Ports Authority, Hadiza Bala Usman and the Special Adviser for Social Protection Plan to the Nigerian President, Maryam Uwais and several other activists to start the campaign for the return of the kidnapped school girls in Chibok Community, Borno State, Nigeria. The campaign led to the adoption of the hashtag #BringBackOurGirls across the world.

Mahdi and her organization’s legal team successfully fought for the freedom of Amina Lawal Kurami who was accused of adultery and was sentenced to death by stoning by the Katsina State Sharia court. Lawal had a baby girl in 2002 out of wedlock and the daughter was used as evidence of her adultery at the court.

In 2001, Mahdi and her legal team defended Safiyatu Hussaini who was convicted by the Upper Sharia Court in Gwadabawa, Sokoto State for adultery and sentenced to death by stoning.

== Awards ==
On 15 November 2011, Nigerian President, Goodluck Jonathan conferred her with the National Honours Award Member of the Order of the Federal Republic (MFR). The National Merit award was in recognition of her work in development, advocacy, human rights and defense of women.
