= Maryam Uwais =

Nigerian Women's Right advocate and lawyer

Maryam Uwais MFR
- Born: Maryam Isa Wali; Kano State
- Education: Ahmadu Bello University, Zaria
- Occupations: Lawyer; business woman; politician; human right activist
- Known for: Advocacy, Development, rights of women and children
- Spouse: Mohammed Uwais
- Father: Isa Wali
- Awards: National Honours Award of the Order of the Niger (2011)

Maryam Hajiya Uwais, MFR is a Nigerian businesswoman, lawyer, human rights activist and politician. She served as the special advisor to President Muhammadu Buhari on social investments from 2015 to 2023. She worked at the Kano state ministry of industry, the Central Bank of Nigeria and the Nigerian Law Reform Commission.

Before her appointment as special adviser, Uwais was an activist against poverty. She worked in N-Power.

== Career ==
Uwais attended Ahmadu Bello University in 1981 and obtained her LL.M in 1985. The Nigeria Institute of Advanced Legal Studies awarded her a certificate of honor in Advanced practice and Procedure that same year and Legal drafting in 1989. She worked as a consultant for several organizations including the Open Society Initiative for West Africa, UNICEF, World Bank, and the Department for International Development of the United Kingdom.

She worked as a special rapporteur on Child's right of the council of the National Human Rights Commission. In 2009, She founded the Isa Wali Empowerment Initiative. She has also worked as a Non-Executive Director and Member of Board of Directors of Stanbic IBTC Holdings.

== Activism ==
Her advocacy has been on gender related issues and feminism. She quoted, "...child marriage as the worst form of violence against the girl-child."

Uwais was the National Coordinator of At-Risk-Children Programme sponsored and owned by the Federal Government of Nigeria. Most of her work also touches child marriage in Nigeria and proposing Women's empowerment.

== Media and public image ==
She was one of the speakers for TEDxYaba 2017.

== Fellowships ==
- Kashim Ibrahim Fellowship
- Fellow of World Economic Forum, 2019.
- Nigeria Leadership Initiatives
- advisory group to accelerate progress of the sustainable development goals (SDG) by The Bill and Melinda Gates Foundation

== Awards and recognitions ==
In 2011, Goodluck Johnathan awarded Maryam, Saudatu Mahdi and others a National Honour of Member of the Order of the Federal Republic. The International Women's Society awarded her that same year with the Humanitarian of the Year Award. In 2012, she was the recipient of This Day Awards for women of service in Nigeria. She was the recipient of National Human Rights Commission Awardee for Outstanding Contributions in the Advancement of the Rights of Women and Children in Nigeria, 2015.

In 2018, Uwais was honoured with the ‘Public Social Intrapreneur’ award by the Schwab Foundation for Social Entrepreneurship.

== Publications ==
- Uwais, Maryam (2007). The protocol on the rights of women in Africa and its compatibility with Islamic legal principles; In: Grace, tenacity and eloquence: the struggle for women's rights in Africa. Fahamu. pp. 144–151. ISBN 9780954563721.
