= Northern Elements Progressive Union =

Northern Elements Progressive Union Jam'iyyar Neman Sawaba
- Abbreviation: NEPU
- President: Aminu Kano
- Founded: 1950
- Dissolved: 1966
- Split from: Northern People's Congress
- Preceded by: Northern Elements Progressive Association; Free North; Spikin Movement
- Succeeded by: People's Redemption Party
- Headquarters: Kano, Northern Nigeria
- Newspaper: Daily Comet
- Student wing: Zahar Haqu
- Youth wing: Rundunar Samarin Sawaba; Askiyanist Movement
- Membership (1960): 500,000
- Ideology: Socialist economics Social liberalism Democratic humanism Nigerian nationalism
- Colours: Black, Green, Red
- Slogan: Sawaba ('freedom')

Party flag

The Northern Elements Progressive Union (NEPU) was the first political party in Northern Nigeria. Founded in Kano on 8 August 1950, it was the offshoot of a pre-existing political association called the Northern Elements Progressive Association. It became the main opposition party in Northern Nigeria after the region was granted self-governance in the 1950s. In the First Republic it maintained a steady alliance with Zikist National Council of Nigeria and the Cameroons (NCNC) against the Northern People's Congress (NPC)-dominated Federal Government.

== History ==
In the late 1940s, the dawning of a constitutional conference (the Richards Constitution) spurred a crisis in the then Socio-Cultural Association of Northern Nigeria the NPC. The conservatives keen on protecting Northern traditions were reluctant to spearhead any transformation in the socio cultural dynamic of the region while the leftist led by Sa'adu Zungur championed a form of radical modernization they called Democratic Humanism. This in turn ignited a wave discontent within leftist circles in the North, on 8 August 1950, a conference of leftist individuals representing the Spikin Movement and pro-Zungeru modernists at a building in Yoruba road, Kano issued the Sawaba Declaration; a proclamation of a political front calling for a socialist revolution in Northern Nigeria, the Student wing of the party called Zahar Haqu had members such as Abdullahi Aliyu Sumaila. This was to become the enduring manifesto of NEPU. An English translation by Aminu Kano of the original Hausa document published by the party in 1953 called on the 'Talakawa' or populace to launch a 'class struggle against the ruling class'.

After a protracted struggle within the party between Abba Maikwaru and Malam Aminu Kano (then a schoolteacher). A shift of support by the Spikin Movement in the Lafiya Convention of 1953 resulted in a victory for Aminu Kano from then on, Aminu Kano was to dominate the party infrastructure until 1964, when the same radicals that supported him turned against him and created a parallel structure called the Northern Elements Freedom Organization.

== Notable members ==
- Mallam Aminu Kano
- Mallam Albatan Yerima Balla
- Mallam Sa'adu Zungur
- Mallam Magaji Dambatta
- Abdulkadir Danjaji
- Hajiya Gambo Sawaba
- Tanko Yakasai
- Mudi Sipikin
- Abdullahi Aliyu Sumaila
- Wada Nas

== See also ==
- Sawaba Declaration
