= Gambo Sawaba =

Nigerian political activist

- Born: Hajaratu Gambo; 15 February 1933; Lavun, Niger State
- Died: 14 October 2001 (aged 68); Zaria, Kaduna
- Education: Native Authority Primary School, Tudun Wada
- Occupations: Women's rights activist, Politician, Philanthropist
- Political party: Northern Element Progressive Union (NEPU)
- Parents: Isa Amartey Amarteifio (father); Fatima Amarteifio (mother)

Hajia Gambo Sawaba (15 February 1933 – October 2001) was a Nigerian women's rights activist, politician and philanthropist. She served as the deputy chairman of Great Nigeria People's Party (GNPP) and was elected leader of the national women's wing of Northern Element Progressive Union (NEPU).

== Background ==
=== Parents ===
Hajia Sawaba was born to Isa Amartey Amarteifio (christened Theophilus Wilcox) who was an immigrant from Ghana and Fatima Amarteifio, a Nupe woman from Lavun Local Government, Niger State. Amarteifio was a graduate of Ghana School of Survey who immigrated to Nigeria in 1910 and sought to be employed by the Nigerian Railway Corporation.

Fatima's maternal great-grandfather was a blacksmith and warrior. His son, Mamman Dazu, was Gambo's maternal grandfather. Mamman Dazu is said to have been a great warrior and widely consulted.

=== Birth ===
Isa Amartey Amarteifio converted to Islam after moving to Zaria. He met Fatima and later married her after some years. Fatima was a widow who already had 3 children with Mohammadu Alao, her late husband. Their marriage produced six children of whom Sawaba was the fifth. She was called Hajaratu. According to the Hausa naming custom, any child born after the birth of twins was called Gambo, hence the name Hajaratu Gambo.

=== Early life and education ===
She was educated at the Native Authority Primary School in Tudun Wada. She however had to stop schooling after the death of her father in 1943, and her mother dead three years after. She was married off at age 13 to a World War II veteran, Abubakar Garba Bello who left and never returned after her first pregnancy. Her subsequent marriages did not last. One marriage ended because she and her spouse, Hamidu Gusau, engaged in violent fights.

Quite noticeable about her when she was a child, was her unusual interest in mad people. She spoke with them, accommodated some and gave the ones she could money, clothes and food. As a child she was often described as stubborn and heady and almost always got into street brawls. According to her "I could not stand by to watch a weak friend or relation being molested." She said she used to take over such fights. Whenever she got to the scenes of such fights, she would immediately say "OK, I have bought the fight from you" to the weaker person and take over the fight.

== Political career and activism ==
Sawaba was involved in politics since she was 17. During that time, Northern Nigeria was dominated by the Northern People's Congress, which had the support of the Emirs and British Colonial Authority but she joined the opposition group Northern Element Progressive Union (NEPU). She was a campaigner against under-aged marriages, forced labour and an advocate for western education in the north. Gambo made a name for herself when at a political lecture during her career in the North, she climbed up and spoke out in a room full of men. She was mentored by Funmilayo Ransome-Kuti and traveled to meet her in Abeokuta years later. She is widely regarded as the pioneer of fighting for the liberation of northern women. Sawaba was not her birth name. Meaning freedom or redemption, it was given to her by her political mentor, Malam Aminu Kano, after she had been elected president general of NEPU's women's wing.

== Personal life and legacy ==
A general hospital was named after her in Kaduna. A hostel at Bayero University, Kano is also named after her.

== Imprisonment ==
She was imprisoned 16 times for openly advocating against child marriage, forced and unpaid labour and unfair taxes, and canvassed for jobs for women, education for girls and full voting rights. She was also rated as "the most jailed Nigerian female", it was evident that she had a blanket inscribed "Prison Yard" which she always took with her whenever she got arrested.1
