= Mohammed Tanko =

Ghanaian footballer (born 1988)

Personal information
- Full name: Mohammed Tanko Ismaila
- Date of birth: November 15, 1988 (age 37)
- Place of birth: Ghana
- Height: 6 ft 0 in (1.83 m)
- Position: Striker

Team information
- Current team: Heart of Lions

Youth career
- Koftown FC
- 2005–2006: Liberty Professionals
- 2006–2007: Great Olympics

Senior career*
Years	Team	Apps	(Gls)
2008–2010	Heart of Lions		
2010–2011	CD Leganés	1	(0)
2011	→ CD Teruel (loan)		
2011–2012	Medeama SC		
2013–2016	Heart of Lions		
2017	Aduana Stars		(4)
2018	Elmina Sharks		
- * Club domestic league appearances and goals

Mohammed Tanko Ismaila (born 15 November 1988) is a Ghanaian footballer, who played club soccer in Spain and at home in Ghana.

== Club career ==
Tanko won the 2009 H.P. Nyametei Cup final with Heart of Lions, scoring a goal in the second leg to help his team to victory.

He played professionally for CD Leganés and from January to June 2011 on loan for CD Teruel. On 9 June 2011 signed a contract for Medeama SC and returned to his native Ghana. He left Medeama in 2013 returning to Heart of Lions through 2016.

Tanko played for several clubs in the Ghana Premier League including Aduana Stars, where he signed in 2017. He was released from Elmina Sharks in January 2019 when the club lowered their wage bills.

== International career ==
Tanko was a member of the Ghana national under-17 football team and Ghana national under-20 football team. Since 2009 he is member of the Ghana national football team.

== Honours ==
- H.P. Nyametei/SWAG Cup 2009
- Ghana Premier League 2017
