= Maksim Tanko =

Belarusian footballer

Personal information
- Date of birth: 18 March 1994 (age 32)
- Place of birth: Bobruisk, Belarus
- Height: 1.86 m (6 ft 1 in)
- Position: Goalkeeper

Youth career
- 2012–2016: Belshina Bobruisk

Senior career*
Years	Team	Apps	(Gls)
2016–2018	Belshina Bobruisk	2	(0)
2017–2018	→ Khimik Svetlogorsk (loan)	16	(0)
2019	Khimik Svetlogorsk	8	(0)
- * Club domestic league appearances and goals as of 31 December 2019

Maksim Tanko (Belarusian: Максім Танько; Russian: Максим Танько; born 18 March 1994) is a Belarusian former professional footballer.

On 6 August 2020, the BFF banned Tanko from Belarusian football for 2 years for his involvement in match fixing.
