= 1953 Kano riot =

Ethnic riot in Northern Nigeria

1953 Kano Riot
- Location: Kano Nigeria
- Date: May 1953
- Target: Yoruba, Igbo
- Attack type: Riot
- Deaths: 46
- Injuries: 500

The Kano riot of 1953 was a 4-day clash over the issue of Nigerian independence which broke out in the city of Kano, located in Northern Nigeria, in May 1953. The clashed happened primarily as a result of disagreements between the Northerners, mainly Hausa and Fulani people who were largely opposed to the idea of Nigerian independence, and the Southerners, mainly Yorubas and Igbos who supported immediate independence for Nigeria.

== Causes ==
The remote cause of the riot was the strained relationship between the Northern and Southern political leaders over the issue of self-government in 1956. This strained relationship started with a 1953 motion for self-government for Nigeria in 1956 tabled in the House of Representatives by a member of the Action Group (AG), Chief Anthony Enahoro. The Northerners did not accept the motion. The leader of the Northern People's Congress (NPC) and the Sardauna of Sokoto, Alhaji Ahmadu Bello, in a countermotion, replaced "in the year 1956" with the phrase "as soon as practicable". Another Northern member of the House moved a motion for adjournment, a motion which Southern members of AG and the National Council of Nigeria and the Cameroons (NCNC) viewed as a delay tactics. All the AG and NCNC members in the house walked out as a result of the adjournment motion.

When the Northern delegates left the House, they were confronted by hostile crowds in Lagos who insulted, jeered, and called them all sorts of names. Members of the Northern delegation were embittered, and in their "Eight Point Program" in the Northern Regional Legislative House, they sought for secession. The last straw that broke the camel's back was the tour by a delegation of the AG and NCNC led by Chief Samuel Akintola. That tour which was aimed at campaigning for self-government acted as the immediate cause of the Kano riot. It sparked off a chain of disorder that culminated in the riot. The riot took place at Sabon Gari an area predominantly occupied by southern Nigerians.

== Riot ==
There was already growing tension in the North when the Action Group northern tour came to Kano during the weekend of 15–17 May, the tension was a result of the hostility towards the Northern delegation in Lagos. An orderly demonstration by the Northern Peoples Congress supporters against a proposed Action Group meeting took place on 15 May. This was followed by small skirmishes the following day. Disturbances that led to the riot started out at the Colonial Hotel, on 16 May 1953 which was supposed to be the venue of a meeting by the Action Group led by Akintola. Prior the meeting, the Kano Native Authority withdrew its permission to grant the meeting. A mob gathered outside of the hotel and started stoning people close to the hotel, during the fracas, two people believed to be southerners died, the mob later attempted to gain entry into Sabon Gari but were subdued by the Native Authority police. The situation became more serious and became an inter-ethnic crisis on 17 May when mobs of hooligans from Northern section of Kano, in particular Fagge attempted to break into the Southern and Igbo dominated Sabon Gari area with some success, though their original chants were against the Yorubas, the casualties in the Sabon Gari area were mostly Igbos. Shops in the Sabon Gari Market were looted and violent attacks took place. But the Native Authority police and the Army were called upon and prevented further entry of hooligans into the Kano area. The skirmishes further spilled into the indigenous Kano areas such as Fagge where small unorganized groups of people of different ethnic groups clashed.

An exchange of prisoners took place to reduce the tension, Southerners who were arrested were released and Northerners also released; Northerners in the Sabon Gari area were asked to leave and Southerners in the Fagge area were asked to move to Sabon Gari for the meantime. About 46 Nigerians mostly Northerners and Yorubas, with a minor number of Igbos killed during the clash and more than 200 people were treated for injuries. Though it was immediately called an inter-ethnic riot by the colonial government in Nigeria, the political leaders termed it a political riot between people who want self-government in 1956 and those who want imperialism to continue.

== Political implications ==
The riot left behind great effects which include:

- The relationship between North and South deteriorated.
- Action Group and the National Council of Nigeria and the Cameroons went into temporary alliance against the Northern People's Congress thus bridging relationships.
- Granting of greater regional autonomy to the three regions.
- Removal of power of intervention by the centre in all residual matters
- Sir Oliver Lyttelton, the Secretary of State for the Colonies, announced that it is impossible for the regions to work together, and therefore representatives from each region will be invited to discuss a new Nigerian constitution.
- it led to the adoption of a federal system of government.

== See also ==
- 1966 anti-Igbo pogrom

== Bibliography ==
- Omipidan Teslim: The Kano riot of 1953, OldNaija
