= Sabon Gari Market =

Market in Kano, Nigeria

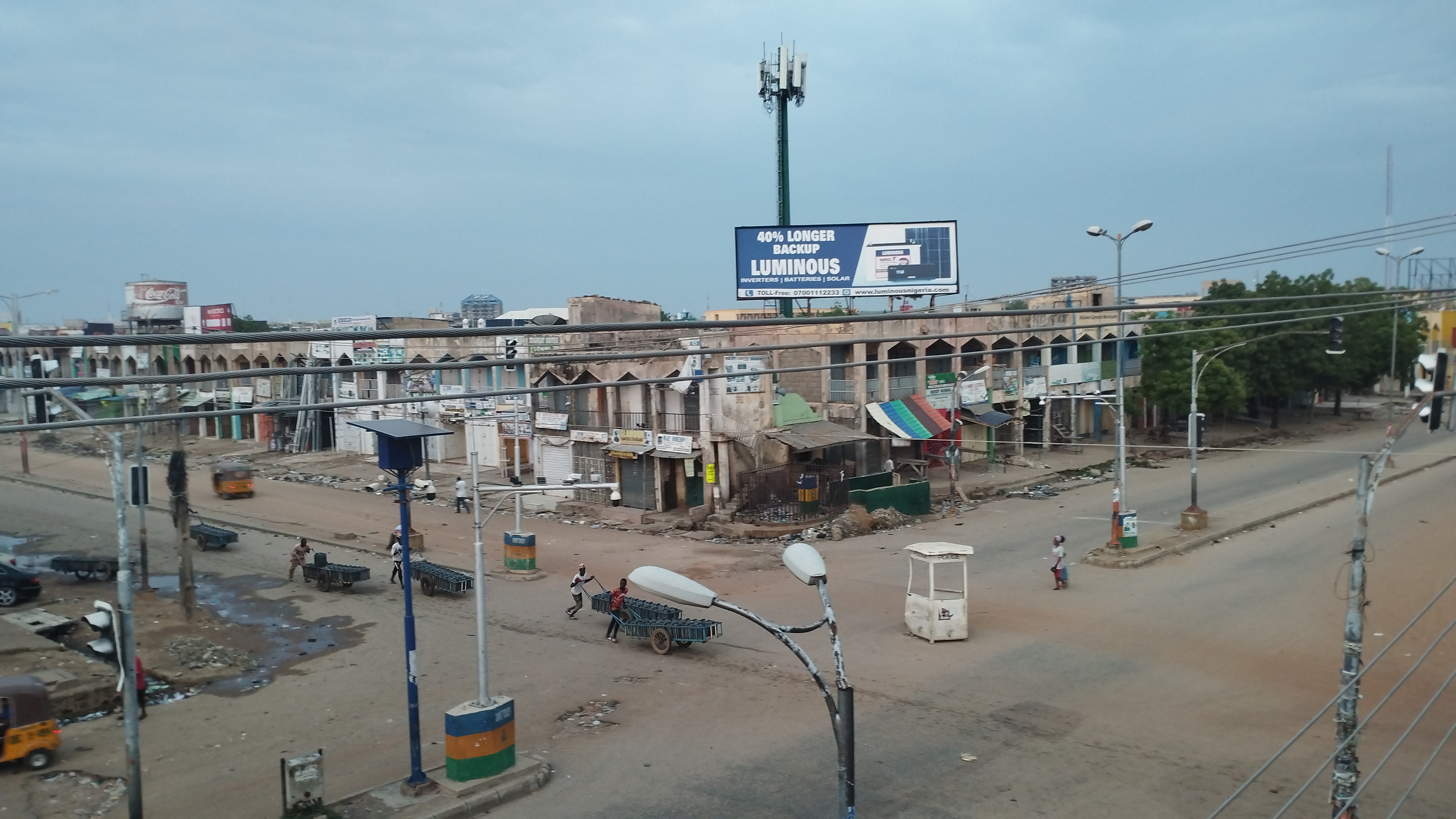
- Location: Kano, Nigeria; 12°0′55.4″N 8°32′23.6″E
- Opening date: 1915
- Interactive map of Sabon Gari Market

Sabon Gari Market is a marketplace in Kano, Kano State, Nigeria. It was built in 1914, but it did not open until 1915.

== History ==
The market was created by Sabon Gari neighborhood. When the provinces of North, South and Lagos were united, the people of Southern Nigeria moved to the cities of the North. Since there are different cultures and religions, it became difficult at that time to mix these immigrants and the original citizens. Therefore, they were settled in this area, and conducted their own business in their places. Thus the Sabon Gari market was established.

It was rebuilt under the government of Kano with a modern building in 1983. The market is the biggest market in Kano. It will be reconstructed.
