= Mudi Sipikin =

Nigerian poet and politician (1930–2013)

- Born: Mahmud Muhammad; 1930; Darma quarters, Kano, Northern Region, British Nigeria
- Died: February 19, 2013 (aged 82–83); Fagge, Kano State
- Occupations: Poet, businessman, politician
- Notable work: Arewa Jamhuriya Kawai
- Political party: Northern People's Congress
- Other political affiliations: Askianist Movement: Northern Elements Progressive Union; Action Group
- Children: 23

Alhaji Mudi Sipikin (1930–19 February 2013) was a Nigerian poet and founding member of the Northern Elements Progressive Union (NEPU), the radical political party that was the main opposition in the Northern Region during the Nigerian First Republic. He got his surname 'Sipikin' from when he was a clerk for NEPU, owing to his habit of mispronouncing "This is Mudi speaking" instead answering "This is Mudi sipikin". While the majority of his works were written in Hausa, under the supervision of Richard Ali, efforts have been undertaken by the Poetry Translation Centre to preserve and translate these literary works into English.

== Life ==
Mudi Sipikin was born in the Darma quarters of the city of Kano in 1930. During the 19th-century, his grandfather migrated from Auyo in Hadejia (in present-day Jigawa State) to Kano. One of his first teachers was his father, Muhammadu Buwa, who taught him Arabic and Islamic literature from an early age. To further his Islamic studies, he attended a Qur'anic school overseen by Mallam Umaru Badamagare of Damagaram. Sipikin never attended a formal Western school but, later in life, he studied under his more educated friends like Sa'adu Zungur, Maitama Sule and Aminu Kano. In the 1960s, he was informally educated through a correspondence course with a British school, and later attended a series of adult education and literacy classes in Kano.

At about the age of 18, Spikin published his first poem, which "showed concern with the welfare of the poor". During the 1950s, he gained popularity through his poems which were published in Gaskiya Ta Fi Kwabo. His most well known poem from his pre-independence days was Arewa Jumhuriya Kawai ("The North, a Republic Pure and Simple"), a reply to Sa'adu Zungur's Arewa Jumhuniya ko Mulkiya ("The North: Republic or Monarchy?"). Zungur's poem urged the Emirs of the North to align with Nigeria's rapid modernisation while preserving its Islamic identity. Sipikin rejected this position as indicated in his reply, calling for the abolition of the emirate system in favor of embracing Republican ideals in the North. He published about 300 poems, which were on various topics such as religion, politics, economic life, science and "the conditions of living of the population". In 1964, he founded the influential Hikima Kulob ('Wisdom club'), a poet's circle based in Kano and Kaduna. The club focused on the creation, declamation, and dissemination of poems on current events. The club's poems were broadcast over radio stations as a way to keep the general populace informed. Although majority of its members were men, some of the most renowned female Hausa poets from this period were members of the club, like Hauwa Gwaram and Hajiya 'Yar Shehu.

During the late 1940s and early 1950s, Sipikin helped establish the Northern Elements Progressive Union (NEPU). In March 1951, he founded the Askianist Movement which, until its collapse in 1955 due to financial irregularities, acted as an off-shoot of NEPU. It takes its name from Muhammad Askia, who usurped the throne of the medieval Songhai Empire and ushered in what is generally considered the empire's golden age. Followers of the movement hailed Aminu Kano, leader of NEPU, as the modern Askia; who was going to lead the party in replacing the ruling government–Native Authority, British colonialists, and the ruling Northern People's Congress–and, like Muhammad Askia, usher in a golden age. In 1954, members of the movement raised funds to construct a school but later discovered irregularities in the accounting of the fund. Consequently, Sipikin was removed as president and expelled from the movement. The disillusionment among members resulting from this incident led to the party's disbandment a year later.

Before founding the Askianist Movement, he attended the 1953 London Constitutional Conference as an Action Group delegate. Between 1980 and 1983, he was the chairman of the newly established Kano State Agency for Mass Education to improve education and eradicate illeracy in the state. In 1981, the agency won the UNESCO trophy for achievement.
