= Osita Agwuna =

Nigerian activist (1921–2007)

- Born: 22 December 1921
- Died: 22 December 2007 (aged 85–86)
- Movement: Zikist
- Honours: Eze of Enugu-Ukwu, Anambra State

Osita Agwuna (22 December 1921 – 2007) was a Nigerian activist who was deputy president of the Zikist Movement in 1947. He was among a group of young Zikist members who expressed militant criticism of colonial rule and urged concerted action to overcome colonialism. Agwuna later became known as the Eze of Enugu Ukwu, serving the town in that position for 5 decades.

== Early and background ==
Osita was born on 22 December 1921 in Enugu-Ukwu, Anambra State, Nigeria. His parents lived in Enugu-Ukwu, where his father, Christopher Chidebe Ndibe, served as a postmaster and his mother, Elizabeth Ofuchinyelu Ndibe, served as a headmistress.

== Zikist Movement and positive action ==
In 1947, the Zikist Movement, under the leadership of Raji Abdallah and his deputy, Agwuna, adopted a radical strategy known as "positive action", which encouraged civil disobedience to achieve nationalist goals. Two incidents contributed to the movement's adoption of this strategy: an incident involving racial discrimination against a Black officer at the Bristol Hotel and the shooting of Nigerian striking workers in Burutu.

In 1948, the movement published ''A Call for Revolution'', which called for civil disobedience and was written to encourage radical action against colonial rule. On 27 October 1948, Agwuna delivered a speech in which he described Nigeria as a police state and argued that positive action, including strikes, boycotts and civil disobedience, was necessary to liberate Nigerians from colonial rule.

== Sedition trial and imprisonment ==
Three days after delivering the speech, Agwuna was charged with sedition. He had anticipated that his speech and the Zikist Movement's publications could lead to arrests and government repression, which the movement believed could provoke wider nationalist action and draw public attention to the colonial government. The movement also expected that Nnamdi Azikiwe might be arrested, but this did not occur, and the movement's ideas had not yet gained widespread support across Nigeria. During his trial, Agwuna challenged the authority of the court, arguing that the judge lacked jurisdiction to try him because he was both an accuser and a judge. He was convicted and sentenced to one year in prison.
