= Abubakar Ladan =

Nigerian Poet and Singer

- Born: Abubakar Ladan; 1935; Zaria, Nigeria
- Died: December 23, 2014 Zaria, Nigeria
- Genres: Music of Nigeria, Hausa music
- Occupations: Poet, singer

Abubakar Ladan (1935 – 23 December 2014) was a Hausa poet/singer from Northern Nigeria. He is best known for Wakar Hada Kan Al'ummar Afirka, a collection of poems published in 1976. The poems are famous for promoting African unity and integration, and for championing African independence and progress. Since their publication, several of his poems have been sampled in the analysis of the metrical structure of Hausa prosodic poetry.

== Early life ==
Alhaji Abubakar Ladan was born in Kwarbai, Zaria city, Kaduna, in colonial Northern Nigeria. He attended Islamic school, and Elementary Town School from 1945 to 1949. He later enrolled in Middle School Zaria (now Alhudahuda College) from 1950 until 1954. After graduating, he worked briefly as a veterinary officer and as a quality inspector for leatherworks. Abubakar Ladan in the 1950s was a supporter and a member of NPC. He used his poetry to mobilize popular support for PRP's Alhaji Aminu Kano.

Alhaji Abubakar Ladan's interest in poetry had been sparked by the songs of his fellow countrymen, Sa'adu Zungur and Mu'azu Hadeja, and the Sudanese Arab singer, Abdel Karim al Kabli. Around 1970, Abubakar Ladan recorded a sung rendition of Mu'azu Hadeja's famous poem Tutocin Shaihu da Waninsu ("The Banners of the Sheikh and others").

== Wakar Hadan Kan Al'ummar Afirka ==
The formation in 1963 of Organization of African Unity prompted Malam Abubakar Ladan to compose his famous poems in Hausa. The poems characterize his vision of a united and prosperous Africa that secures liberty for all its people. His poems examined the common experience of the countries he visited, the emergence of African nation states from colonialism, and the heroes driving the independence movements in the 1960s. The poems are grouped into sections that cover the arrival of European colonialists (Zuwan Turawa Afirka), the attainment of liberty in Africa (Samun 'Yanci A Afirka), the champions of African unity (Baraden Hada Kan Afirka), and the wonders of Egypt (Al'ajuban Masar).

A common refrain scattered around his poems is the prayer, Allah ya Allah ya Allah, Hada kammu Afirka mu so juna ("Allah o Allah o Allah, Unite us Africans to love each other").

== Awards ==
- He was awarded MON during the administration of Alhaji Shehu Shagari.
- In September 2014, he was awarded OON by the administration of Goodluck Jonathan.
