= High Commission of Nigeria, Accra =

Diplomatic mission of Nigeria in Ghana

Coordinates: 5°34′25″N 0°11′1″W

The Nigerian High Commission in Accra is the primary diplomatic mission of Nigeria in Ghana. It is on 20/21 Onyasia Crescent Roman Ridge in Accra. The previous High Commissioner was former Senator for Lagos Central Musiliu Olatunde Obanikoro, appointed by President Umaru Yar'Adua in May 2008.

The High Commissioner in 2012 is Hon. Ademola Oluseyi Onafowokan.

== Official and economic ties ==
In August 2007 the Nigerian High Commission in Ghana launched Nigeria's 47th Independence anniversary celebrations in Accra. Ambassadorial Minister Simon Ejike Eze thanked Ghana for honoring Nigerians by naming a major stretch of road after former Nigerian president, Olusegun Obasanjo. He also said that the Commission would not hesitate to hand over Nigerians who engage in criminal activities to the Ghanaian security agencies any time. When Musiliu Obanikoro presented his credentials to President John Agyekum Kufuor in May 2008, the President discussed the long history of cooperation between the two West African countries, and mentioned that Nigerian expertise would be valuable now that Ghana had struck oil.

In November 2009 the Nigerian High Commission in Accra working with Vintage Vision, an Accra-based, Nigerian owned business management firm, was planning to launch a Ghana-Nigeria Chamber of Commerce and to initiate a long-overdue trade and investment treaty between the two countries. Speaking at a book fair in November 2009 Adedapo Oyekanuri, Minister at the Nigerian High Commission, said cooperation between the two countries should not only be on trade, diplomacy and peacekeeping but cultural advocacy through reading.

== Nigerians in Ghana ==
The relations between the countries have been strained at times. In 1969, Ghana expelled foreigners who were mostly Nigerians. In the 1980s Nigeria in turn expelled foreigners mainly Ghanaians. In September 2006 the high commissioner intervened to calm down students at the Kwame Nkrumah University of Science and Technology, Kumasi, after a student was stabbed to death and another two Nigerian students were injured by an armed robber.

Nigeria's high commissioner has said that the news media in Accra contributes to tension by overplaying crime stories involving Nigerians. In July 2009, Obanikoro said the High Commission had launched a re-branding campaign to showcase Nigeria's positive aspects and huge potential. At the same time, he told reporters that 300 Nigerians were serving jail sentences in Ghana for crimes such as kidnapping, drug peddling and armed robbery.

In June 2020, armed men invaded land on which the Nigerian Commission was erecting a building and pulled down parts of the said building.

== See also ==
- Ghana–Nigeria relations
