= Zikism =

System of thought aimed to African liberation

Zikism is the system of political thought attributed to Nnamdi Azikiwe ("Zik"), one of the founding fathers of modern Nigeria and the first President of Nigeria. Azikiwe expanded on this philosophy through his published works, such as Renascent Africa (1973) and his autobiography My Odyssey.

Zikism also spurred a group of young men to take a militant stand against colonial rule in Nigeria.

== Overview ==
Zikism is characterised by five principles for African liberation:

- Spiritual balance

To show empathy for other peoples views, and recognize their right to hold such views.

- Social regeneration

To expel from one's self national, religious, racial, tribal, political-economic, and ethical prejudice.

- Economic determinism

To realize that being self-sufficient economically is the basis for rescuing the Renascent African.

- Mental emancipation

To be knowledgeable of African history and accomplishments, and to dismiss any kind of complex exhibited by any race or tribe.

- Political resurgence

To regain the sovereignty that Africa has lost to colonialists.

== Zikist movement ==
In 1940s colonial Nigeria, Azikiwe's ideas about Africans managing their own affairs and his struggle against colonial authorities became an inspiration to young men who wanted political and economic freedom. Among these men was Nwafor Orizu, who dedicated a chapter in his book, Without Bitterness, published in 1944, to the ideology of Zikism. In the book, Orizu expounded ideals, albeit ambiguously about building a new African society with a new outlook on family, political, social, and economic life.

In 1946, a group of young Nigerians inspired by the speeches and writings of Azikiwe and Orizu formed the Zikist movement, a youth wing within NCNC with its own flag, song, and logo. The first meeting of the movement was inside the hall of Tinubu Methodist High School and had in attendance many individuals who later played prominent roles in Nigeria's path towards independence.

The early period of the movement was its most active. In October 1948, inside Tom Jones Hall, at a meeting chaired by Tony Enahoro, Osita Agwuna, an assistant editor with the Daily Comet, delivered a hostile speech against colonialism entitled A Call to Action. The militant tone caught the interest of colonial officials who were wary of the socialist outlook of many Zikists and its potential to be a base of funding by the Soviet Union to promote Marxism. Movement members, Agwuna, Anthony Enahoro, Fred Anyiam, Raji Abdallah, Smart Ebbi, and Oged Macaulay, were arrested and charged with sedition. In the court room, Abdallah and Agwuna were defiant, but most were found guilty and subsequently fined or jailed. Two other events also contributed to the rise of the movement's profile. In 1949, in the midst of a coal miners strike, a crisis emerged after a bungled attempt by police officers to move explosives led to the killing of miners in Iva Valley Enugu, and an incident of racial prejudice at Bthe ristol Hotel, inIkoyi spurred members to lead protests against colonial rule through the means of positive action. But an attempted assassination of a colonial officer by an individual alleged to be a member of the movement led to the formal proscription of the movement in April 1950.

Though the movement's ideals were synonymous with the personality and oratory of Azikiwe, Azikiwe was ambivalent about their political and economic outlook, and they did not receive substantial support from him as many members would have hoped. In addition, the socialist and virulent anti-colonial campaign did not generate the same interest among some NCNC members.

== Quotes on Zikism ==
In the case of the great Zik, it became fashionable among his adherents and supporters to be a Zikist. But Zikism was not synonymous with an ethnic ideology, nor was it a divisive cause. Instead, Zikism was more of an ideology for the African Renaissance, emphasizing the restoration of the dignity of the black man after centuries of colonial imposition and exploitation.
