= West African Pilot =

Nigerian newspaper launched in 1937 by Nnamdi Azikiwe

- West African Pilot Newspaper Front Cover 13th May 1954
- Type: Media Publication
- Format: Print
- Publisher: Nnamdi Azikiwe
- Founded: 22 November 1937
- Language: English

The West African Pilot was a newspaper launched in Nigeria by Nnamdi Azikiwe ("Zik") in 1937, dedicated to fighting for independence from British colonial rule. It is most known for introducing popular journalism within Nigeria. The main focus of the newspaper was to promote Nigerian independence from colonial rule. Football was a topic often used within the media to promote these various arguments of independence. With humanistic language and powerful ideas, the West African Pilot successfully promoted the humanity of African workers in this colonized world. The newspaper dismissed the idea that sports and politics are to be separated, further supporting African's connection to the game and adding specific cultural impact to the game itself; this supported a new kind of identity pertinent to the Nigerian people. Through fictional stories and football centered symbolism, the newspaper was even said to have, "created the possibility of a new form of imagined community", setting the stage for how a modern society should be.

== Foundation and growth ==
When the paper was launched its quality and professionalism launched it atop other newspapers of the period which generally pandered to colonial authorities or ethnocentric interests. The most prominent newspaper that lost circulation, as a result, was the Nigerian Daily Times originally owned by the Mirror Group of London. The paper's lively mix of radical politics and gossip, plus a woman's page, was highly popular. The newspaper played a key role in the spread of racial consciousness and nationalistic ideas in the interior of Nigeria. Its motto was "Show the light and the people will find the way". Azikiwe personally edited the West African Pilot from 1937 to 1947.

The paper led the way for enterprising black journalism. The paper tied together the sport of soccer with social justice. Azikiwe's paper used soccer to increase the growing unpopularity of colonization in Nigeria. The paper was extremely popular, and it had a circulation of around 25,000 and a lot more readers. This paper brought forth the start of popular journalism in Nigeria.

The West African Pilot gave birth to a chain of newspapers that were positioned as city newspapers in such places as Port Harcourt, Warri, Enugu, Ibadan, and Kano. All the titles were then owned by "Zik's Press Limited". Titles included the Eastern Nigerian Guardian launched in 1940 in Port Harcourt, the Nigerian Spokesman in Onitsha (1943) and the Southern Defender in Warri, the "Sentinel" in Enugu. In 1945, Zik's group bought Mohammed Ali's Comet, four years later converting it into a daily newspaper and then transferring it to Kano, where it was the first daily in the north. The Northern Advocate was also launched in 1949, in Jos. On 8 July 1945, the government banned the West African Pilot and the Daily Comet for misrepresenting facts about the general strike. This did not silence Azikiwe, who continued to print articles and editorials on the strike in his Port Harcourt Guardian.

In June 1953, Azikiwe published an issue of the paper that used soccer as a political metaphor. In the article titled "Nigeria Wins Freedom Cup in Thrilling Political Soccer," it told a story of a fictional match in which the British lost a match to Nigeria by the score of 10–0. This was one of the many ways Azikiwe influenced his readers greatly.

== Ethnic tensions ==
Azikiwe was criticized by a section of the Yorubas for using his newspaper to suppress opposition to his views since anyone who spoke out risked being labelled an "Uncle Tom" or "imperialist stooge", and having his reputation destroyed. Azikiwe did not suffer those who wanted a divided Nigeria gladly and took particular aim at a group that was preaching politics of exclusion. The dominant party to which Azikiwe belonged was the National Council of Nigerian Citizens (NCNC), a grassroots movement of students, traders, and workers. Its leader was Herbert Macaulay, a Yoruba, while Azikiwe served first as secretary and later assumed the chair when Macaulay died. By 1957 when elections were held in the country, the NCNC and its allies swept the polls in both east and west of the country. Azikiwe, as leader of the party, was however prevented from forming a government in the West because a few independent candidates "crossed carpet" to join the opposition which formed the government. This opposition had previously constellated in a group called Egbe Omo Oduduwa. The West African Pilot did not pull punches in discrediting this rump group that was preaching exclusion, rather than join the fight for independence as one indivisible country called Nigeria. The group, which benefited from the "cross-carpeting" to launch to power, eventually set up a rival newspaper called the Daily Service. Azikiwe did not hide his dislike for this group and used his newspaper to expose what he saw as an attempt to scuttle the battle for independence.

In the 1940s Anthony Enahoro was an associate editor of the paper. Abdul Karim Disu became an associate editor in 1955.

== Post-independence ==
On 16 November 1960, Azikiwe became the Governor General of the newly independent Nigeria, while Abubakar Tafawa Balewa was Prime Minister. By the 1960s, although the paper was circulated throughout the country it was particularly strong in the east. In 1963 the major political parties proposed a "Preventative Detention Act", which would have allowed indefinite detention without trial. The West African Pilot led the outcry against this suggestion, which was dropped. However, the next year the Newspaper Amendment Act was passed, allowing punishment for reporting events that the authorities considered false.

The West African Pilot folded in 1967 following the outbreak of the Nigerian Civil War (1967–70). At the end of the war, there were two attempts to resuscitate the newspaper, both of which failed. The last attempt (1993) was promoted by a group of Azikiwe's political and professional allies, including Chief Adeniran Ogunsanya, Chief Matthew Tawo Mbu, and Chief Duro Onabule who was then spokesman for military president Ibrahim Babangida. It was edited by Ogbuagu Anikwe but could not survive the skyrocketing printing materials costs after the country was embroiled in a violent election dispute over Chief Moshood Abiola's victory on the presidential elections of that year.

== Sources ==
- Alegi, Peter (2010). African Soccerscapes: How a Continent Changed the World's Game. Athens, Ohio: Ohio University Press. ISBN 978-0-89680-278-0.
- Aguolu, C. C.; Aguolu, L.E. (1997). "A Force in Library Development in Nigeria". World Libraries. 07 (2). ISSN 1092-7441.
- Auduson, Ibrahim (1 October 2010). "From West African Pilot to Daily Trust". Media Trust.
- Coleman, James S. (1971). Nigeria: background to nationalism. University of California Press. ISBN 0-520-02070-7.
- "The Story of Africa:EARLY NEWSPAPERS". BBC.
- Olisa, Michael S. O. (1989). Azikiwe and the African Revolution. Onitsha, Nigeria: Africana-FEP. ISBN 978-978-175-223-0.
- Uche, Luke Uka (1989). Mass Media, People, and Politics in Nigeria. Concept Publishing Company. ISBN 81-7022-232-X.
