= Parliament of Nigeria =

Former federal legislature of Nigeria

Type
- Type: Bicameral
- Houses: Senate; House of Representatives

History
- Founded: 1 October 1960
- Disbanded: 1979
- Preceded by: Legislative Council of Nigeria

Leadership
- President of the Senate: Nwafor Orizu (last)
- Speaker of the House of Representatives: Ibrahim Jalo Waziri (last)
- Prime Minister: Rt. Hon Sir Abubakar Tafawa Balewa
- Seats: 305 Members of Parliament; 12 senators

Elections
- Voting system: Senate: Appointment by the head of state on advice of the Prime Minister of Nigeria
- Voting system: House: First-past-the-post
- Last election: 30 December 1964

Meeting place
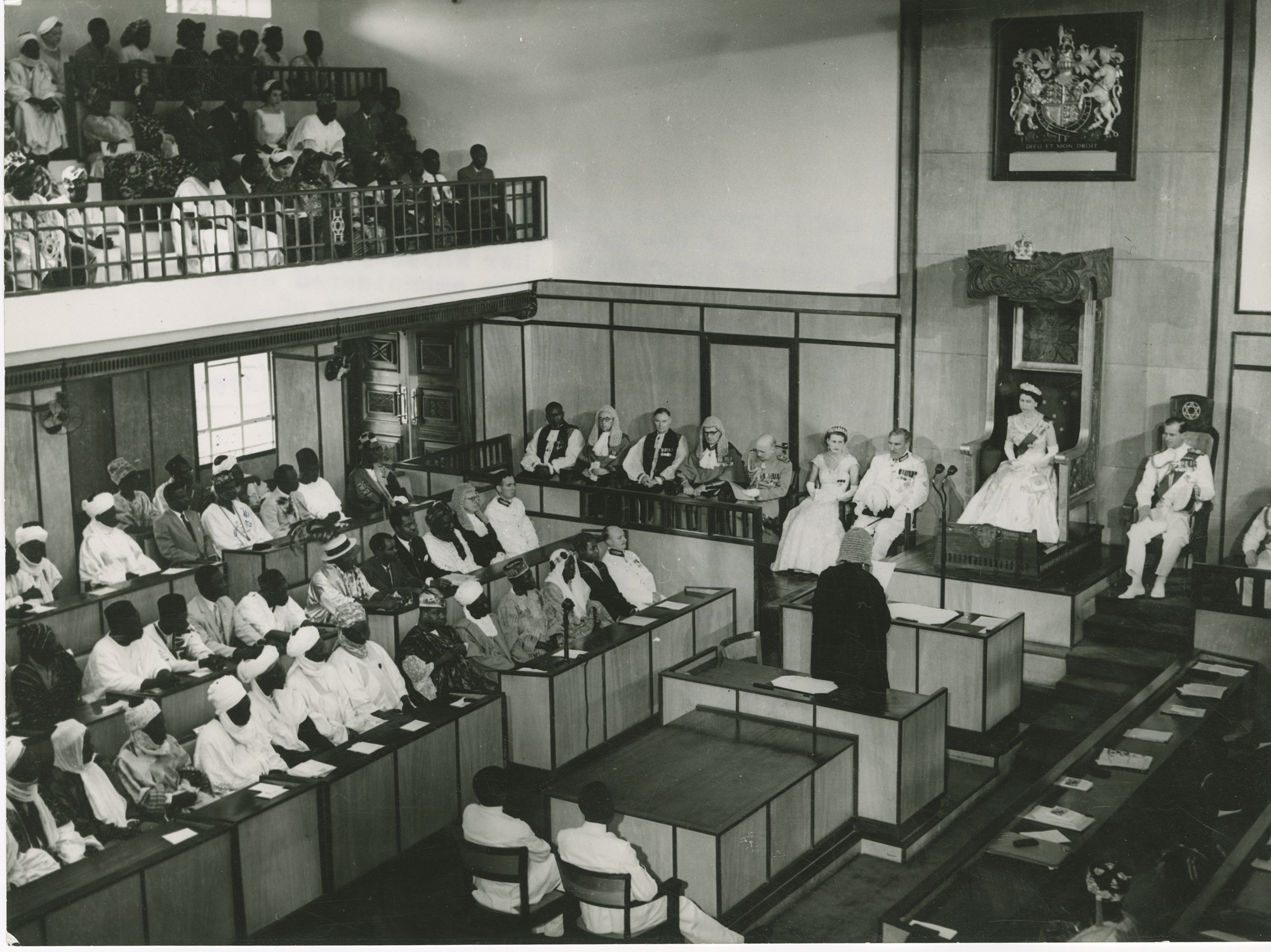
- Lagos

The Parliament of Nigeria, sometimes referred to as the Federal Parliament was the federal legislature of the Federation of Nigeria and the First Nigerian Republic, seated at Tafawa Balewa Square in Lagos, and was composed of three parts: the Head of State (Elizabeth II as Queen of Nigeria from 1960–63, Nnamdi Azikiwe as President), the Senate, and the House of Representatives. By constitutional convention, the House was dominant. Regional parliaments had similar chambers: the House of Assembly and the House of Chiefs.

== History ==
=== Previous legislature ===
The parliament was preceded by the Legislative Council of Nigeria established in 1946. The Macpherson constitution of 1951 expanded the council furthermore by creating a 185-seat federal House of Representatives.

=== Independence parliament ===
The system was slightly adjusted after the proclamation of the republic in 1963.

=== Abolishment ===
Following the assassination of General Murtala Mohammed in 1976, his successor General Olusegun Obasanjo initiated the transition process to terminate military rule in 1979. A new constitution was drafted, which saw the Westminster system of government replaced in favor of a more American-style Presidential system. As a result, Parliament was replaced with the National Assembly, which resembles more the United States Congress in structure.

== Composition ==
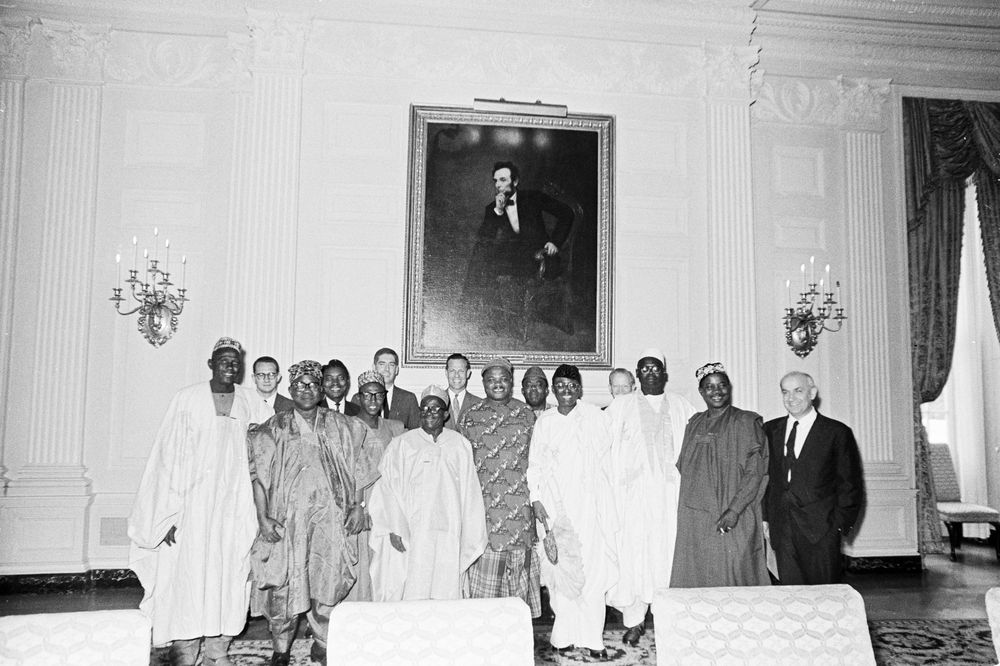
Members of Parliament pose in the State Dining Room during a visit to the White House in 1962.

The Federal Parliament was the legislative branch of the government, consisting of three elements: The President, the Senate (the upper house) and the directly elected House of Representatives (the lower house). Each had a distinct role, but work in conjunction within the legislative process. This format was inherited from the United Kingdom and was a near-identical copy of the Parliament at Westminster.

=== Senate ===
The Senate was modelled after the British House of Lords and the Canadian Senate. It had 20 members, twelve of which represented the each region and were nominated by an electoral college of their regional assembly. four were appointed by the President on the advice of the prime minister and the remaining four individuals represented the Federal Territory: the Oba of Lagos (an ex officio Senator), a chief selected by parliament, two other individuals.

=== House of Representatives ===
The elected component of Parliament was the House of Representatives. To run for one of the 305 seats in the lower house, an individual had to be at least 40 years old. Each member holds office until Parliament was dissolved, after which they may seek re-election. Only those who sit in the House are usually called members of Parliament (MPs).
