= Akinola =

Akinola is both a given name and a surname.

Notable people with the given name include:

- Akinola Aguda (1923–2001), Nigerian jurist
- Akinola Deko (1913–1987), Nigerian building contractor and politician
- Akinola Maja (died 1976), Nigerian physician, businessman and politician

Notable people with the surname include:

- Aniff Akinola, British DJ
- Ayo Akinola (born 2000), Canadian soccer player
- Charles Akindiji Akinola (born 1956), Nigerian politician, businessman and consultant
- Fimihan Akinola (born 2001), British-Nigerian rapper better known as Fimiguerrero
- Modupe Akinola, American psychologist
- Peter Akinola (born 1944), Nigerian Anglican archbishop
- Segun Akinola, British composer for television and documentaries
- Simeon Akinola (born 1992), Spanish-Nigerian footballer
- Stephen Akinola (1953–2021), Nigerian Pentecostal pastor
- Tunji Akinola, footballer
- Yewande Akinola (born 1985), Nigerian engineer
