= Ibadan Peoples Party =

Party in Western Region, Nigeria

The Ibadan Peoples Party (IPP) was established on June 15, 1951, by a group of eminent Ibadan indigenes who opposed the policies which held sway in the Yorùbá dominated Western Region, Nigeria in the 1950s. Its founding chairman was Chief Augustus Akinloye, and the other founders were; Chief Adegoke Adelabu, Chief Kola Balogun, Chief T. O. S. Benson, Chief Adeniran Ogunsanya and Chief H. O. Davies. The other leaders of the IPP were: Chief S. A. Akinyemi, Chief S. O. Lanlehin, Chief Moyo Aboderin, Chief Samuel Lana, Chief D. T. Akinbiyi, Chief S. Ajunwon, Chief S. Aderonmu, Chief R. S. Baoku, Chief Akin Allen and Chief Akinniyi Olunloyo.

== Elections of 1951 ==
When the election into the Western Region House of Assembly was completed in November 1951, the Action Group won 38 out of the 80 seats contested in the first set of elections. Independents who had been part of the inauguration of Action Group( Egbe Afenifere) had however won seats as Independent candidates.In Ibadan, the Ibadan Peoples Party( IPP) won all the six seats up for grabs while in Lagos; the NCNC won all the available five seats. Before the elections were held, Action Group & NCNC were making conflicting claims on the membership of the candidates. This was in spite of individuals like Chief Anthony Enahoro, who had been previously a card carry member of NCNC, before the formation of Action Group, publicly declaring for Action Group & attending the inauguration of Action Group at Owo in February 1951. In an action to set the records straight, Mr. Harold Cooper, the Government Public Relations Officer, wrote to the parties to furnish a list of the candidates contesting election on their platforms. Only the Action Group complied with this request and its list of candidates was as follows: Ijebu Remo Division – Obafemi Awolowo and M.S. Sowole; Ijebu Ode Division – S.O. Awokoya, Rev. S.A. Banjo and V.D. Phillips; Oyo Division – Chief Bode Thomas, Abiodun Akerele, A.B.P. Martins, T.A. Amao and SB Eyitayo; Osun Division – SL Akintola, JO Adigun, JO Oroge, S.I. Ogunwale, I.A. Adejare, J.A. Ogunmuyiwa and S.O. Ola; Ondo Division – P.A. Ladapo and G.A. Deko; Okitipupa Division – Dr. L.B. Lebi, CA Tewe and SO Tubo; Epe Division – SL Edu, AB Gbajumo, Obafemi Ajayi and C.A. Williams; Ikeja Division – O. Akeredolu-Ale, SO Gbadamosi and FO Okuntola; Badagry Division – Chief CD Akran, Akinyemi Amosu and Rev. GM Fisher; Egba Division – J.F. Odunjo, Alhaji A.T. Ahmed, CPA Cole, Rev S.A. Daramola, Akintoye Tejuoso, SB Sobande, IO Delano and A Adedamola.

The others were as follows: Egbado Division – J.A.O. Odebiyi, D.A. Fafunmi, Adebiyi Adejumo, A. Akin Illo and P.O. Otegbeye; Ife Division – Rev S.A. Adeyefa, D.A. Ademiluyi, J.O. Opadina, and S.O. Olagbaju; Ekiti Division – E.A. Babalola, Rev. J Ade Ajayi, S.K. Familoni, S.A. Okeya and D Atolagbe; Owo Division – Michael Adekunle Ajasin, A.O. Ogedengbe, JA Agunloye, LO Omojola and R.A. Olusa; Western Ijaw Division – Pere EH Sapre-Obi and MF Agidee; Ishan Division – Anthony Enahoro; Urhobo Division – WE Mowarin, J.B. Ohwinbiri and JD Ifode; Warri Division – Arthur Prest and O. Otere, and Kukuruku Division – D.J.I. Igenuma.

Of the names on the list, only MA Ajasin from Owo Division, which comprised Akoko then, did not run because of party solidarity and unity in Owo. He stood down for A.O. Ogedengbe and R.A. Olusa to contest two of the three seats, which they won, while D.K. Olumofin won the third for the NCNC. Three secretaries of the Action Group, who ran as independents and won were: Alhaji D.S. Adegbenro, Egba Division; J.O. Osuntokun, Ekiti Division and S.O. Hassan, Epe Division.

At the close of polls on 24 September 1951, the Action Group had won 38 of the 72 seats in contention in the Regional Assembly. There were a total of 80 seats. Lagos had five seats in the West Regional Assembly all won by the NCNC in the election of 20 November 1951, while Benin had three won by Otu Edo candidates in the election of 6 December 1951. The poll had been postponed in Lagos and Benin following security concerns. Of the 68 candidates on the list furnished by the Action Group to the Government PR Department, 38 of the elected AG members were from that list. And they were as follows: Ijebu Remo – Obafemi Awolowo and M.S. Sowole; Ijebu Ode – Rev. SA Banjo and S.O. Awokoya; Oyo – Bode Thomas, Abiodun Akerele, ABP Thomas, TA Amao and SB Eyitayo; Osun – S.L. Akintola, J.O. Adigun, JA Oroge, S.I. Ogunwale, I.A. Adejare, J.A. Ogunmuyiwa and S.O. Ola.

Other elected AG members from the list were: Egba – J.F. Odunjo, Alhaji AT Ahmed, Rev. S.A. Daramola and Prince Adedamola; Egbado (now Yewa) – J.A.O. Odebiyi, D.A. Fafunmi and A. Akin Illo; Ekiti – E.A. Babalola and Rev. J. Ade-Ajayi; Badagry – Chief CD Akran and Rev. G.M. Fisher; Ikeja – SO Gbadamosi and O Akeredolu-Ale; Ife – Rev. SA Adeyefa and SO Olagbaju; Owo – AO Ogedengbe and RA Olusa; Epe – Safi Lawal Edu; Okitipupa – C.A. Tewe; Western Ijaw – M.F. Agidee; Ishan – Anthony Enahoro, and Warri – Arthur Prest.

In addition to the Action Group and the NCNC, there were local/divisional parties such as the Ibadan People's Party (IPP), led by Chief AMA Akinloye; Ondo Improvement League, and Otu Edo of Benin. At the end of poll, the standing of the parties was as follows: Action Group 38; NCNC/Independents 25; IPP 6 and Ondo Improvement League 2. Otu Edo candidates won the three Benin seats, namely, Chief SO Ighodaro, Chief Humphrey Omo-Osagie and Chief Chike Ekwuyasi. Chief Ighodaro opted for the AG, while the latter two went to the NCNC. And of the six IPP elected members, only Adegoke Adelabu joined the NCNC. The rest of them: AMA Akinloye, Chief DT Akinbiyi (who later became the Olubadan of Ibadan), Chief SO Lanlehin, Moyosore Aboderin and SA Akinyemi, opted for the Action Group. The NCNC National Secretary, the late Chief Kola Balogun had sent declaration forms to the IPP assemblymen asking them to declare for the NCNC but Chief Akinloye returned all the forms uncompleted.

The three AG secretaries who had run as independents – Adegbenro, Osuntokun and Hassan, five IPP members, one Etu Edo, and one Ondo Improvement League, Chief F.O. Awosika; and Chief Timothy Adeola Odutola (Independent, Ijebu Ode) had swollen the number of the AG elected members. All the transactions had taken place before the inauguration of the Regional Assembly on 7 January 1952. These were not known members of the NCNC, nor did the party publish their names on the list of its candidates. For over a half century, the NCNC is yet to provide evidence to back its claim that it had won the West Regional election in 1951.

Mr Cooper absolved his department of responsibility for the controversy generated by the NCNC after the election. At a post election news conference in Lagos he said that "Of the winning candidates, the names of 38 were on the list sent to me by the Action Group. The six successful candidates at Ibadan were all among those who had been identified to me as representing the Ibadan People’s Party. No claim of any kind had reached us about the party affiliation of the remaining successful candidates." Why did the NCNC not send a list of its candidates for the poll to the Government PR Department before that poll? The records of the poll conducted in the West and all over Nigeria by the colonial administration are available at the National Archives and can be accessed by any honest researcher. In this matter, it is facts that speak, not what some political/ethnic partisan said or did not say, as shown below.

NCNC probably underestimated the effect of clear policy & programmes of action contained in Action Group's manifesto. Its prescription of Devolution of powers & a Federal system of gov6was what endeared it to the polity, as well as its programme on education, health & infrastructural deficit developments.

== Body politic ==
The Ibadan electorate did not take kindly to the defection of its elected representatives on the platform of IPP to the Action Group. They used the opportunity of the 1954 federal elections and the 1956 regional elections to express their aversion of the Action Group. In the 1954 Federal elections, when both parties went head to head; the NCNC won 22 seats in the House of Representatives of Nigeria while the AG secured 19 seats. In Ibadan, the capital city of the Western Region, the ruling party AG secured just one out of the five federal seats up for grabs. The loathing of the AG by the Ibadan electorate was further demonstrated in the regional elections, which was held on May 26, 1956. Despite the fact that the election was held after the AG had been in power for five years, and had implemented significant social projects, particularly in the area of education; the results for 1956 were: 48 seats won by the AG and 32 seats by the NCNC. However, a closer scrutiny of the actual votes cast revealed that, the margin of victory between the AG and the NCNC was just 39,270 votes. The AG got 623,826 or (48.3%) of total votes, while the NCNC got 584,556 or (45.3%) of the total votes cast. The battle lines had been drawn; the ensuing mayhem and ruthless machinations that encapsulated the Ibadan political scene, degenerated and continued to spiral out of control until 1966, when the military seized control of the government, and banned all political parties in Nigeria.
