= Israel–Niger relations =

- Israel: Niger

There are no formal bilateral relations between the State of Israel and the Republic of Niger. Diplomatic relations between the countries were active between the independence of Niger in 1960 and 1973. Relations were renormalised in 1996, but terminated by Niger in 2002. There are no special travel or trade restrictions between citizens of the nations.

== Previous relations ==
Niger obtained independence from France in 1960, and at the time established relations with the government of Israel, although Niger never established a permanent mission there. During the early 1960s, several Israeli development programmes, mostly concerned with exchange of experts in agricultural development in arid regions, were established in Niger. The Israeli government also helped in the founding of the Young Pioneers of Niger, a national youth and civil group. In the mid 1960s, Niger opened an embassy in Israel. Following the 1967 Arab-Israeli war, Nigerien popular and government feelings toward Israel cooled. The Israeli government for its part disapproved of Niger's closer relations with Libya, beginning in 1969. The continued Israeli conflict with its neighbors, increased pressure from allies like Libya, and the movement of a number of African nations in a similar direction, caused the Republic of Niger to formally end all diplomatic relations with the government of Israel on 1 January 1973.

Arab, African, and non-aligned organisations had made a number of moves towards breaking relations with Israel following 1967, and these continued in the early 1970s. The Organization of African Unity (OAU) at its summit meeting in June 1972 went beyond its 1971 criticism of Israel in unanimously calling for a virtual UN arms embargo of Israel. That same year, Uganda broke diplomatic relations with Israel in March; Chad followed in November. Israel announced on December 25 the closing of its embassies in Niger and the Republic of the Congo "for budgetary and administrative reasons", leaving only non-resident accreditation in these two countries. The Congo reacted by severing relations completely, denouncing Israeli policies as "imperialist and expansionist". Niger also severed relations completely, the ruling Niger Progressive Party called Israeli representation in Niamey "inappropriate." The official Nigerien policy of a break on relations was announced on 1 January 1973, to go into effect on 4 January.

Several other of Niger's neighbours severed relations at the same time, including Mali (4 January 1973: continues to have no relations with Israel) and Nigeria (which reestablished relations in 1992).

== Informal ties ==
Informal ties with Israel continued under the government of Hamani Diori, as well as under Seyni Kountché after 1974. Whatever relations remained were further hurt in the late 1970s by the Israeli opening of relations with the Apartheid regime in South Africa. and with Israeli charges that Niger had shipped uranium ore to Libya and Iraq. In 1979, Niger revealed that it had sold 258 tonnes of uranium to Libya in 1978, and continued sales to opponents of Israel: 1212 tonnes to Libya in 1981 and an unknown amount to Iraq prior to the Israeli attack on the Iraqi Osirak nuclear reactor on 1 June 1981. Political relations remained strained through successive governments because of the Nigerien perception of the Israeli–Palestinian conflict, and Israel's continued close relations in the 1970s and 1980s with Apartheid South Africa.

Niger voted "yes" on the 1975 United Nations Resolution which "determine[d] that Zionism is a form of racism and racial discrimination".

== Reestablishment and break ==
Formal reestablishment of ties, without the reopening of embassies, occurred on 28 November 1996. This reopening, like that between neighbours such as Mauritania, came in the wake of the Oslo Accords, the end of occupation, and pressure from the United States to support a perceived opening of a Palestinian – Israeli peace. The actual opening, coming from the Nigerien end in October 1996, was spurred by the 27 January 1996 military coup of Col. Ibrahim Baré Maïnassara and the new government's desire to reverse the subsequent withdrawal of aid from Niger's two primary sponsors, the United States and France. In less than three years Maïnassara had been overthrown, and Niger's new democratic government had restored relations with the west.

In April 2002, following the Second Intifada of 2000, and growing street protests against Israeli and United States foreign policy, the government of Niger again announced formal rupture in diplomatic relations.

In closing relations, Niger became the first nation to sever ties with Israel since the Palestinian uprising began in 2000.

In the official statement on 21 April, the Nigerien government condemned Israeli military actions in the Palestinian territories, and condemned the "intransigence of Prime Minister Sharon and his clearly stated wish to revisit all of the past decisions of the peace process, which is seriously threatening peace and security in all of the Middle East."

Shortly before the rupture in relations Nigerien official Lawal Kader Mahamadou, in denouncing Israel's conflict with the Palestinians, accused Israel of "genocide" during an appearance on state television, saying "Palestine must live as a sovereign state". Israeli Foreign Ministry officials stated that although they were disappointed in the break in ties, relations since 1996 had amounted to little more than the exchange of a few Israeli agricultural experts and Nigerien university students.

== Current ties ==
As of 2023, there remains no diplomatic relations between the two nations. There are no specific trade or travel restrictions between the two nations. All visitors from outside the Economic Community of West African States (ECOWAS) must have a visitor's visa when entering Niger, while Nigeriens face no formal restrictions upon travel to Israel. While there are at times protests against Israeli policy in Niger, Israelis continue to travel to and work in the country.
