= Obisesan =

Obisesan is a surname mostly found in people of West African descent. Notable people with the surname include:

- Akinpelu Obisesan (1889–1963), Nigerian diarist, businessman and politician
- Gbolahan Obisesan, British Nigerian writer and director
- Olufunmilayo H. Obisesan, Post-doctoral Research Fellow, Johns Hopkins University
