= Fawehinmi =

Fawehinmi is a surname. Notable people with the surname include:

- Gani Fawehinmi (1938–2009), Nigerian author, publisher, philanthropist, social critic, lawyer, and politician
- Samuel Fawehinmi (1912–1998), Nigerian furniture businessman
- Tobi Fawehinmi (born 1995), American Paralympic athlete
