= Adegbenro =

Adégbénró
- Gender: Male
- Language: Yoruba

Origin
- Origin: Nigerian
- Meaning: The crown uplifts me
- Region of origin: South West Nigeria

Other names
- Variant form: Gbénró

Adégbénró is a Nigerian surname of Yoruba origin, typically given to males. It means “The crown uplifts me.” This unique and culturally significant name is often associated with royal families, reflecting a heritage of nobility and honor.

== Notable individuals with the name ==
- Dauda Soroye Adegbenro (1909–1975), Nigerian politician
- Samuel Adegbenro (born 1995), Nigerian footballer
- Wahab Adegbenro (1955–2020), Nigerian physician
