= Abdul Ganiyu Agbaje =

Retired justice of the Nigerian Supreme Court

Abdul Ganiyu Agbaje (born 23 November 1925) is a Nigerian retired judge who served as a justice of the Nigeria Supreme Court.

Agbaje was born on 23 November 1925, to the family of Salami Agbaje, a wealthy merchant based in Ibadan. He was born into a polygynous family, his mother Lamulati Faderera was the fourth wife of Salami Agbaje. Some of his brothers went on to make a name for themselves in Ibadan and Nigeria. Saka Agbaje was a U.K. trained doctor, the first western trained doctor from Ibadan and who established Alafia Hospital in Ibadan, while a second son, Mojeed was a political associate of Adegoke Adelabu. Agbaje was briefly educated at Ibadan Grammar School like many of his older siblings, but later transferred to Igbobi College to complete secondary education. Agbaje later traveled abroad for further studies, earning a bachelor of commerce degree in Industrial Economics & Business Studies in 1949 and a degree in law in 1951.

In Nigeria, Agbaje was a law partner to his brother Mojeed Agbaje, and represented members of the Ibadan branch of NCNC in many court cases.

Agbaje served as a lawyer and partner in the law firm of Agbaje and Agbaje from 1952 to 1959 and was appointed Judge of the high court in the Western State of Nigeria in 1969. He later served as a judge of the Federal Court of Appeal for ten years from 1977 to 1987 before retiring as a Supreme Court judge in 1990.
