= Chief the Honourable Minister =

1970 novel by T. M. Aluko

- Author: T. M. Aluko
- Language: English
- Series: African Writers Series
- Genre: Literary fiction
- Publisher: African Writers Series
- Publication date: 1970
- Publication place: Nigeria
- Media type: Print (Paperback)
- Preceded by: One Man, One Matchet

Chief the Honourable Minister is a 1970 social novel by Nigerian writer T. M. Aluko. It was his third novel published in the influential African Writers Series after One Man, One Matchet.

== Plot ==
The book talks about Alade Moses, who is the protagonist of the book. An African thinker who was the pride of his hometown (Newtown), he received his education overseas before returning to become the principal of the Grammar School. He is abruptly called back to duty while in England on a five-week tour of British Grammar Schools planned by the British Council and is told via cable that he has been made a minister in the new government.

Moses genuinely wants to do what is best and is fundamentally honest, but his efforts are frequently derailed by party politics and his semi-corrupt colleague ministers
