= One Man, One Matchet =

Novel by T. M. Aluko

- First edition
- Author: T. M. Aluko
- Language: English
- Genre: Historical novel
- Publisher: Heinemann
- Publication date: 1964
- Publication place: Nigeria
- Media type: Print (hardback & paperback)
- Pages: 203
- ISBN: 978-0435900113 (reissued)
- Preceded by: One Man, One Wife (1959)
- Followed by: Kinsman and Foreman (1966)

One Man, One Matchet is a novel written by Nigerian author T. M. Aluko and published in London in the year 1964 as the 11th book in the Heinemann African Writers Series. The novel tells the story of a community in Western Nigeria during the end of the colonial period and beginning of independence. Set in a small community where the majority of the inhabitants are dependent on the revenue from their cocoa crops, the story looks at the role of the semi-literate Benjamin Benjamin in the small community.
