= Sanya Dojo Onabamiro =

Nigerian academic (1913–1985)

- Born: 24 May 1913; Ago-Iwoye, Ogun State, Colonial Nigeria
- Died: 1985 (aged 71–72)
- Occupations: Copepodologist; academic administrator
- Spouses: Polygamous: 1. name unknown 2. Georgiana Adedunmola Aderin; 3. maybe another
- Children: 1. unknown number 2. 3 (Aderin); 3. maybe more

Academic background
- Education: University of Manchester (B.Sc); University of Ibadan (PhD)
- Doctoral advisor: Kenneth Mellanby

Academic work
- Main interests: Copepodology
- Notable works: Discovered the cause of dracunculiasis (Guinea Worm disease)

Sanya Dojo Onabamiro (1913–1985) was a Nigerian copepodologist, statesman, and academic. He earned his PhD from the University of Ibadan in 1951 and was, according to his thesis supervisor, Kenneth Mellanby, "the first person to qualify for a PhD degree in any colonial university college".

Onabamiro is attributed as having discovered the cause of dracunculiasis (Guinea Worm disease).

== Biography ==
Onabamiro was born on 24 May 1913 in Ago-Iwoye, Ogun State in the Southern Nigeria Protectorate of the Colonial Nigeria. His father and mother Matilda Oduyemi Ajibola, was a palm oil and cocoa farmer. The Methodist Church mission schools, during the period, spread throughout the Western part of the country 1846. Onabamiro began his education at Ago-Iwoye Methodist Primary School, which was for basic children, and was established around 1910. He left and later completed his primary education in Ibadan, Oyo State around 1928; and completed his schooling at Wesley College and Yaba Higher College, supported by Methodists.

Granted a scholarship to study in the United Kingdom, he graduated from the University of Manchester with a Bachelor of Science, majoring in zoology, in 1947, read at Oxford for a year before returning to Nigeria in 1949 to commence his PhD, completed in 1951, focused on copepodology.

Following a period of activism for improved educational facilities, following the independence of Nigeria in 1960, Onabamiro was appointed as the Western Region Minister for Education (1960–1963) where he supervised the creation of the Obafemi Awolowo University and free education programs for the region. He later served as Minister for Agriculture (1963–1966), before returning to academic life, following the 1966 coup d'état.

As a witness in the 1960s trial of Obafemi Awolowo on treason charges; there were conflicting versions as to whether Onabamiro was complicit in the actions taken against Awolowo.

Onabamiro died in 1985.

== Honours ==
In 2025, the University of Ibadan named the administration block of its postgraduate college in honour of Onabamiro, in recognition of his contribution to the academic and administrative history of the university and the education sector in Nigeria.

A guinea worm, Tropocyclops Onabamiroid, was named in his honour.
