= Stephen Oluwole Awokoya =

Former minister of education/old Western Region of Nigeria

- Born: July 1913; Oyo
- Died: 1985
- Citizenship: Nigerian
- Education: Yaba College; University of London
- Occupation: Teacher

Stephen Oluwole Awokoya (1913–1985) was a former minister of education in the Western Region of Nigeria. He was one of the leading architects of a nationalistic policy to promote formal schooling in Nigeria during the 1950s. He is credited for the creation of the universal primary education in Western Nigeria.

== Early life ==
Awokoya attended Yaba College of Higher Education as one of the first batch of students of the school. After completing his studies at Yaba, he chose a career in teaching. He was a teacher at St Andrews College, Oyo and also at Abeokuta Grammar School. After the end of World War II, he became the pioneer principal of Molusi College, Ijebu Igbo. The college was a community sanctioned project but had opposition amongst officials in the education board. However, the community rallied around and opened the school in 1949. After Awokoya left to join the western Assembly, a new principal, Tai Solarin, was chosen to lead the school. In between, he went to Great Britain and obtained a BSc at the University of London. While in London, he became enthralled with African students who saw education and nationalism as convoluted ideas.

== Politics ==
During the colonial era, a legislative amendment by Governor Sir John Macpherson, threw open avenues for indigenous rule by 1951. Awokoya joined politics and by 1952, he was made a minister of education. In July 1952, his position on education became public when he presented a white paper for free and compulsory universal primary education, the report was largely following the lines of the Action Group's electoral promises. Today there are still questions about his role in drafting the policy. Though, his vital role as one of the four major originators of the educational policies is not disputed. Claims that he was the lead architect have led to some arguments proving otherwise.

=== Comprehensive education ===
Awokoya and the Action Group's comprehensive approach to education, especially introducing indigenous goals, was not the first in colonial Africa. Ghana, then called Gold Coast, had a leg up in indigenous focused development, a staple of Awokoya's educational policies. In 1951, Nkrumah and the minister for education in Ghana had introduced an accelerated indigenous development plan for education, which included universal primary education without fees, similar to Awokoya's line of thought. Awokoya's approach to education was to be less derivative in structure and approach of knowledge dissemination but should introduce more indigenous methods and ideas. He also sought a less inhibiting educational program. He attacked what he felt was the primary motive of colonial education: to limit the minds of indigenous Africans in achievements in science and technology and to imbibe in them the benefits of agriculture and farming. He felt, the result was leading to a dependency on imports, with little base for industrial growth and confining traditional Africans to the background in knowledge and production. Awokoya's policy was to make education a necessary catalyst for local production of goods, the development and acquiesce to modern science and technology and upliftment of the minds and souls of Africans. A major critical measure of the policy was also to produce indigenous graduates who can administer the various local, regional and central administrative organs and structures. Awokoya also challenged the dominance of males in education; at the time the ratio was about 4:1.

Most of the education policies of the era led to the doubling of major indices including budgetary allocations to education. Primary school enrollment, number of teachers and primary schools all showed significant growth.

== Beyond ministerial duties ==
He left his position as minister after arguments with Obafemi Awolowo about education funding; Awokoya desired free UPE while Awolowo was skeptical. Also both men were fighting for recognition as originators of the universal primary education. He formed his own party, the Nigerian Peoples Party, but was not well received by the public.

His policies have had their share of critics. Many denounced the failure of the universal primary education. A lot of the criticism drew on attempts to nationalize the scheme, which ended up costing more than 35% of the federal budget, increased unemployment and underemployment, and loosened educational standards.
