= Opral Benson =

Diplomat and a Business Executive

- Born: February 7, 1935 (age 91); Arthington
- Citizenship: Nigeria
- Spouse: Chief T.O.S Benson

Opral Benson ( born Feb, 7, 1935) is Liberian-Nigerian who became the Iya oge of Lagos, OON in 1973. She served both countries as a diplomat, and a business executive.

== Early Life ==
Benson was born in Arthington, Liberia by her parents Johnson and Lily Mason. She was named Opal(Jewel) by her aunt Margaret. However, as a child, Opal renamed herself Opral. She attended Arthington Methodist Episcopal primary school in Arthington, and then proceeded to Arthington Central School, then College of West Africa in Monrovia for her Secondary School education where she had her first child with her biology teacher, John Bilson. Afterwards, she continued her education and was awarded a Liberian Government scholarship at Morris Brown college in Atlanta, USA, where she studied Home Economics and Education.

== Family ==
In 1961, she met her husband T.o.s. Benson who was the then Nigeria's Minister of Information, Broadcasting and Culture at the Monrovia conference . They both got married in 1962 after which she became a Nigerian Citizen. They had children together. Her first child from her secondary school years also remained part of the family. Opral became a widow at age 73 when her husband died on 13th of Feb 2008. She has since lived between Lagos, Nigeria and Liberia.

== Career ==
Opral Benson's career started when she moved to Lagos, Nigeria in 1962. She became the Director of student affairs at University of Lagos. She became the Director and later Chairman of Johnson Products Nigeria Limited. After which she found her own businesses at Yaba, Lagos. She also served as a pioneer board member of the National Youth Service Corps and was a member of the Nigerian Olympic Committee in 1982.

== Honours & Recognition ==
Opral has received several national, cultural and diplomatic recognition. In 1973, she was installed as the Iya Oge of lagos by Oba Adeyinka Oyekan. She was later appointed an officer of the Order of the Niger (OON) by the Federal government of Nigeria. In 2012, Liberian president Ellen Johnson Sirleaf appointed her as the honarary consul of Liberia in Lagos, Nigeria.
