= T. O. S. Benson =

Nigerian lawyer and politician (1917–2008)

Chief T. O. S. Benson S.A.N.
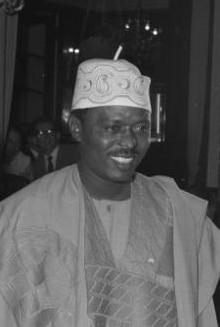
- Benson in Berlin on 21 June 1963
- Born: Theophilus Owolabi Shobowale Benson; 23 July 1917; Ikorodu, Lagos, Nigeria
- Died: 12 February 2008 (aged 90); Ikoyi, Lagos, Nigeria
- Occupations: Lawyer and politician
- Known for: Minister of Information, Broadcasting and Culture
- Spouse: Opral Benson
- Relatives: Bobby Benson (brother)

Chief Theophilus Owolabi Shobowale Benson//, S.A.N. (23 July 1917 – 13 February 2008) was a Nigerian lawyer who became one of the most prominent Yoruba politicians in the period leading up to Nigerian independence in 1960. He served as the Minister of Information, Broadcasting and Culture in the first post-independence government. Benson was imprisoned for several months after the first military coup of 1966. He returned to practise as a barrister, and was recognised as a prominent Yoruba chief.

== Early years ==
Theophilus Owolabi Shobowale Benson was born on 23 July 1917 in Ikorodu, he attended CMS primary school in Agboyi island, Lagos. He was born into an aristocratic family. He was of Yoruba origin. His younger brother was the future musician Bobby Benson. He attended the CMS Grammar School, Lagos. When he was 20, he joined the customs service. In 1943, he moved to London, England, where he studied law at Lincoln's Inn and was called to the bar in 1947. That year, he returned to Nigeria and joined the National Council of Nigeria and the Cameroons (NCNC). He supported his younger brother, Bobby, who was running a touring theatrical group. He thought the group should have an orchestra, and in 1948 bought the band-set popularly called the "Jam-Session Orchestra". He is also a grand uncle of Babajimi Benson who is a member of Nigeria's Federal House of Representatives.

== Pre-independence politics ==
In 1950, Benson was elected to the Lagos Town Council, and later became the Deputy Mayor of Lagos. Benson owed his political success to the support of the cosmopolitan electorate of Lagos. In the 1951 election, Benson was chosen as one of the NCNC candidates for the five Lagos seats in the Western House of Assembly, the others being Nnamdi Azikiwe, Adeleke Adedoyin, A. B. Olorunnimbe and the trade unionist H. P. Adebola. The five candidates easily defeated their opponents from the Action Group. Benson became a national officer in the NCNC.

Benson was a participant in the constitutional conferences in London in 1953, 1957, 1958 and 1960 that led up to Nigeria's independence in 1960. He was elected to various positions on the NCNC platform between 1950 and 1959. In 1954–55, Benson was chairman of the Western Regional Organization Committee. In May 1957, he was National Financial Secretary of the NCNC. He accompanied Nnamdi Azikiwe, Premier of Eastern Nigeria and President of the NCNC, to London for the Nigeria Constitutional Conference at Lancaster House. In 1958, he was National Financial Secretary and a member of the NCNC Strategic Committee. He was also NCNC Chief Whip in the House of Representatives and Chairman of the Lagos branch. In 1959, he was Chairman of the Western Working Committee, having been elected to replace Salami Agbaje, and mediated in a dispute between the factions of Adeoye Adisa and Agbaje in the NCNC. He mostly ruled in favour of the Agbaje faction, resulting in the Adisa faction leaving the NCNC and contesting the elections independently.

Benson was re-elected to the House of representatives in the 1959 federal election. His victory was challenged on the basis that he had not resigned from his office under the Crown before running for election. The Lagos High Court nullified the election on this basis, but the Federal Supreme Court reversed the decision on appeal. The Ministry of Information was created in 1959, with Benson as first minister.

== Post-independence ==
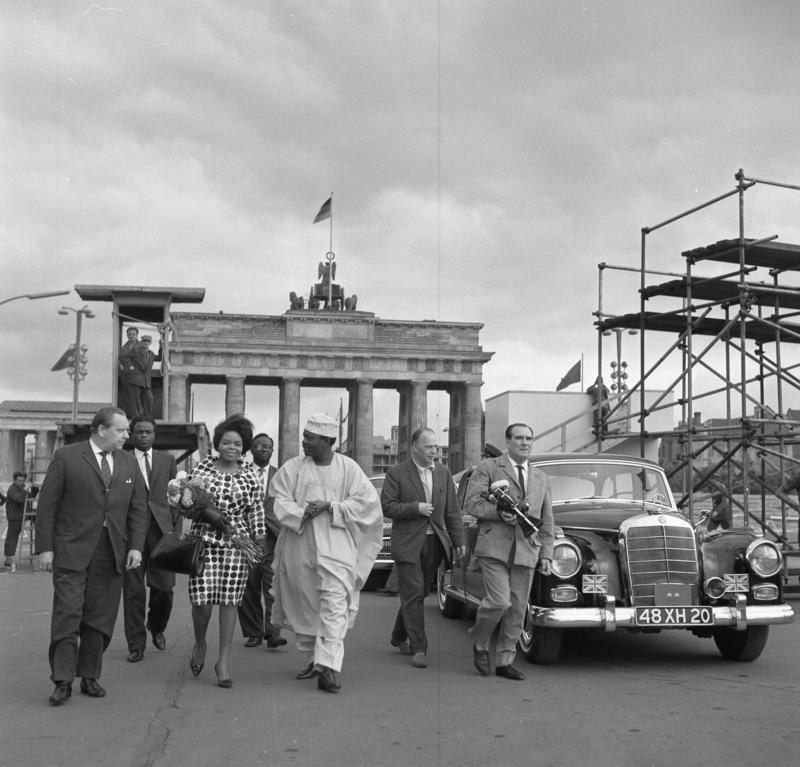
Benson (centre) during a visit to Berlin in June 1963

Benson remained a federal minister in the first government after independence (1 October 1960). The Ministry of Information published the Nigerian Handbook and the Nigerian Magazine, publications that gave information about the country after independence. Benson was the driving force behind establishing the Voice of Nigeria (VON). Radio and television were used to communicate the government's message that the gains of independence should be consolidated and the nation unified, rising above ethnic divisions. K. O. Mbadiwe, Minister of Aviation from March 1964 to March 1965, put on a show he called "Operation Fantastic" to celebrate the inauguration of flights from Lagos to New York in October 1964. He took a troupe of dancers and drummers on the first flight. They performed at various venues in the US with great success. This proved a controversial decision. Benson criticised the show since his ministry should handle the export of Nigerian culture. It was not until 1972 that the affair was settled.

In the early 1960s the Western NCNC was torn between allying with the United Progressive Party (UPP) or the Action Group. The essence of the question was whether Yorubas should align with Hausas or Ibos. Inter-ethnic tensions continued to build. In early 1964 the newspapers were full of charges against political leaders of various ethnic backgrounds saying they were promoting dominance of their ethnic group. Benson, the leading Yoruba politician, Vice-President of the NCNC and Minister of Information, was attacked on these grounds by the Igbo State Union. In the run-up to the 1964 election, the local NCNC in Lagos overrode Benson's objections and chose its four candidates by election in constituency caucuses. An Igbo candidate easily defeated Benson, and the party rejected Benson's appeal. He resigned from the NCNC to run as an independent, and he won the election resoundingly over the Igbo NCNC opponent.

After taking control of the Nigerian Government earlier in January 1966, the military decreed the arrest, in March 1966, for "state security" reasons, 30 politicians from the south. Benson, K. O. Mbadiwe and M. N. Ugochuku were detained at Alagbon, then transferred to the Ikoyi prison. At first the three men were held in one room with no toilet, and were not allowed visitors. Later General Ironsi allowed improvements in the prisoners' detention conditions. They were released on 2 August 1966, four days after the second military coup.

As a lawyer, Benson became a Senior Advocate of Nigeria (SAN). He became a prominent Yoruba chief; although a native of Ikorodu, he held the chieftaincy title of the Baba Oba of Lagos. In a 1990 interview Benson spoke in favour of leadership by rotation for the State Council of Traditional Rulers and Chiefs. T. O. S. Benson died on 13 February 2008, aged 90, at his home in Ikoyi, Lagos.

== Sources ==
- Awa, Eme O. (1964). Federal Government in Nigeria. University of California Press. GGKEY:1QY5QRE1913.
- Diamond, Larry Jay (1988). Class, Ethnicity, and Democracy in Nigeria: The Failure of the First Republic. Syracuse University Press. ISBN 978-0-8156-2422-6.
- Fleischman, Stephen (1 January 2004). A Red in the House: The Unauthorized Memoir of S.E. Fleischman : My Thirty Years in Network News. iUniverse. ISBN 978-0-595-29821-1.
- Chris Anucha (15 February 2008). "TOS Benson is dead". Online Nigeria.
- Disu, Jimi (24 October 2014). To Sam. Dorrance Publishing. ISBN 978-1-4349-3226-6.
- Lynch, Hollis R. (3 May 2012). K. O. Mbadiwe: A Nigerian Political Biography, 1915–1990. Palgrave Macmillan. ISBN 978-1-137-00262-4.
- Oti, Sonny (1 January 2009). Highlife Music in West Africa: Down Memory Lane. African Books Collective. ISBN 978-978-8422-08-2.
- Siollun, Max (2009). Oil, Politics and Violence: Nigeria's Military Coup Culture (1966–1976). Algora Publishing. ISBN 978-0-87586-710-6.
- Sklar, Richard L. (2004). Nigerian Political Parties: Power in an Emergent African Nation. Africa World Press. ISBN 978-1-59221-209-5.
- Watson, Tom (7 November 2014). Middle Eastern and African Perspectives on the Development of Public Relations: Other Voices. Palgrave Macmillan. ISBN 978-1-137-40429-9.
