= Adegoke Adelabu =

Nigerian politician (1915–1958)

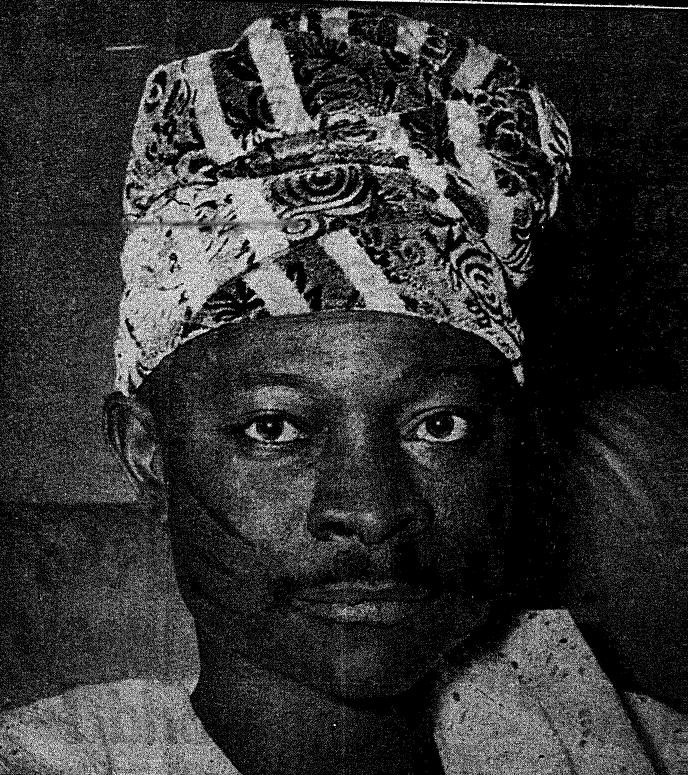

Opposition Leader Western House of Assembly
- In office 1956–1958

Chairman of Ibadan District Council
- In office 1954–1956

Federal Minister of Natural Resources and Social Services
- In office January 1955 - January 1956

Personal details
- Born: 3 September 1915; Ibadan
- Died: 25 March 1958 (aged 42)
- Political party: NCNC

Gbadamosi Adegoke Adelabu (3 September 1915 – 25 March 1958), popularly known as Adelabu Adegoke Penkelemesi, was a prominent personality in the politics of Ibadan city and subsequently that of the Western Region of Nigeria right before the country's independence in 1960. He was Nigeria's Minister of Natural Resources and Social Services from January 1955 to January 1956 and was later the opposition leader in the Western Regional Assembly until his death in 1958. He was a self-made man born into a humble family but became an influential figure in Nigerian politics. He attended Government College, Ibadan and eventually became a businessman. His successful political career was cut short when he was killed in a car crash, not long before Nigeria gained independence from Britain.

Adelabu was a self-described egotist who believed in the merits of radical nationalism, national unity and radical socialist ideology.

== Early life ==
Adelabu was born on 3 September 1915, the son of Sanusi Ashinyanbi and Awujola Adelabu. His mother was the second wife of Sanusi, but she died when Adelabu was quite young and the young Adelabu was then raised by a paternal aunt. From 1925 to 1929, he attended St David's C.M.S. School, Kudeti, Ibadan and finished Standard IV and V at C.M.S. Central school, Mapo. Though a Muslim, Adelabu's aunt valued Western education which was dominated by the Christian missionaries in Ibadan. She obtained a baptismal certificate for Adelabu, providing him the opportunity to attend the CMS schools. From 1931 to 1936, he attended Government College, Ibadan where he completed his secondary education as the head boy of the school. In 1936, he passed the entrance examination into Yaba Higher College and he won a scholarship from UAC to study commerce at the college. However, after 6 months, he left the college with his scholarship unused. He was offered employment by UAC as an assistant to the Ibadan district manager, an expatriate Adelabu had met a year earlier. His first assignment was a tour of the cocoa producing areas of Ibadan province. At the end of the tour, he presented a proposal about the reorganization of the cocoa distribution and trade structure. The report earned him promotion as an assistant produce manager with UAC. However, Adelabu left UAC in 1937 and joined the produce trade business. He was unsuccessful in the trade and was soon looking for a civil service job. In 1939, he became an agricultural inspector and later supervisor of a cooperative society which had Akinpelu Obisesan as its president. He was with the cooperative until 1945, when he went back to UAC. He was successful in his second stint with the organization but after the resignation of his mentor, the Ibadan District Manager Richardson, Adelabu left the firm. He then ploughed income from UAC into a textile trading business with Levantine clients in Ibadan. At the time, the Ibadan Native Authority system was dominated by junior chiefs, family heads (mogaji) and the Olubadan, majority of whom were not literate. Adelabu became interested in acting as an Administrative Secretary for the native council.

== Political life ==
=== 1949–1953 ===
Adelabu's career in politics can be traced to his support of the agitation led by junior chiefs and mogajis against Salami Agbaje. Adelabu was known as a smart individual, and the fact that he was literate brought him to the attention of the chiefs in their opposition to Agbaje. The agitators needed someone to help with writing petitions and commentaries to advance their viewpoint, and so they sought out Adelabu for support. Adelabu obliged, hoping to earn the job of Administrative Secretary. The target of the chiefs was Salami Agbaje, a businessman who held the traditional title of Otun Balogun of Ibadan. As third in line to the throne, literate, rich and independent minded, he was found to be obnoxious by some of the chiefs in Ibadan - many of whom were indebted to him. The junior chiefs and heads of lineages (mogaji) began a campaign for his deposition to prevent him from becoming Olubadan. Adelabu was active in the movement to depose Agbaje, providing print commentaries and assisting in writing the petition that the chiefs forwarded to the colonial authorities. During this period, Adelabu became secretary of the Egbe Omo Ibile, the leading association opposed to Agbaje and headed by Bello Abasi, the son of Aleshinloye, the previous Olubadan. When the case reached the colonial authorities, though Agbaje was admonished and told to suspend his involvement in the native council, the authorities used the opportunity to make sweeping reforms including removing Oshun division from Ibadan province. The outcome was not favorable to many Ibadan groups and a few groups came together to unite politically to protect the interest of Ibadan.

During the local elections in 1951, Adelabu's Egbe Omo Ibile, Augustus Akinloye, and a youth group from Ibadan Progressive Union formed the Ibadan People's Party as a challenge to the old guard of the Ibadan Progressive Union. Adelabu capitalized on some anti-Ijebu sentiments among native Ibadan residents, especially after the loss of Oshun division, which was supported by Action Group leaders such as Awolowo (an Ijebu-man) and Akintola. The new party won all six seats to the Western Regional Assembly. However, an informal alliance proposed by Adelabu to support NCNC fell apart and four of the elected members joined AG. Adelabu then became more active in the organization of NCNC in Ibadan and became the secretary of the party's Western Province Working Committee. He earned recognition within the party as the only IPP legislator who stayed with NCNC. Soon his profile began to rise nationally that in 1952, he published a book, Africa in Ebullition, about his political thoughts. To provide a formidable organization to challenge AG in the 1954 elections, Adelabu formed a new organization, the Ibadan Taxpayers Association which was an attempt to attract mass following based on tax reform. The group then formed an alliance with a farmers group called Maiyegun to become Mabolaje Grand Alliance.

=== 1954–1958 ===
Adelabu and his group provided an opposition platform to the IPU and AG dominated district council. He opposed the district council terms of tax reform and the role of heads of lineages (mogajis) in governance, positioning himself as a supporter of traditional authority and values. During the local elections in 1954, the alliance won majority seats into the Ibadan District Council, paving the way for Adelabu to become district chairman. He became chairman of the Finance Committee and any other standing committee of the council. In the federal elections in 1954, Adelabu also won a seat to the House of Representatives and his party won majority seats to the House of Representatives. He later became the First National Vice President of NCNC and was appointed Minister of Social Services, a post he held concurrently with his position as chairman of the Ibadan District Council from January 1955 till January 1956.

In 1955, Adelabu's administration was a subject of an inquiry into allegations of corruption in the district council. The inquiry was set-up by the Western Regional government dominated by AG. He resigned both positions after the report of the inquiry into the affairs of the district council. He was replaced by J.M. Johnson as Minister of Social Services. In 1956, Adelabu again ran for a seat in the regional assembly, but this time as leader of NCNC in the Western region. Hoping to lead the party to victory, he had ordered clothes with the inscription Adelabu, Premier of the Western Region. However, the party lost majority seats to Action Group. Adelabu then became the leader of opposition in the Western House of Assembly. After the loss, Adelabu sought to carve out a Yoruba Central State from the Western Region. The new state was to be composed of NCNC strongholds of Oyo, Ibadan and Ondo provinces. However, the proposal was rejected in 1958 based on the proposed division on largely on party lines. In 1958, Adelabu opposed the leadership of Azikiwe because of its support for a tripartite national government consisting of AG, NCNC and NPC. Adelabu did not like the inclusion of AG, describing it has an unholy alliance.

== Death ==
Adelabu died on mile 51 of the Lagos–Ibadan Expressway, an area close to Shagamu. He was returning from Lagos along with a Syrian businessman when their car hit an oncoming vehicle.

== Peculiar mess ==
Adegoke Adelabu is often mentioned in Yorùbá and Nigerian history as the author of that expression: "penkelemesi", a Yorubanisation of the phrase, "peculiar mess" which Adelabu, known for his deep knowledge of English, had used on an occasion to describe the opposition in the Western Region House of Assembly. Not understanding what he meant, the non-literate section of his audience translated the phrase into vernacular as "penkelemesi".

== Sources ==
- Sklar, Richard. Nigerian Political Parties: Power in an Emergent African Nation.
- Jenkins, George (1965). Politics in Ibadan (Thesis). Northwestern University.
- Onabanjo, Abayomi (1984). Ethnicity and Territorial Politics: The Case of the Yoruba Speaking Peoples of Nigeria (Thesis). State University of New York at Albany.
- Post, Kenneth; Jenkins, George (1973). The Price of Liberty: Personality and Politics in Colonial Nigeria. London: Cambridge University Press.
