= Israel–Nigeria relations =

Bilateral relations between Israel and Nigeria

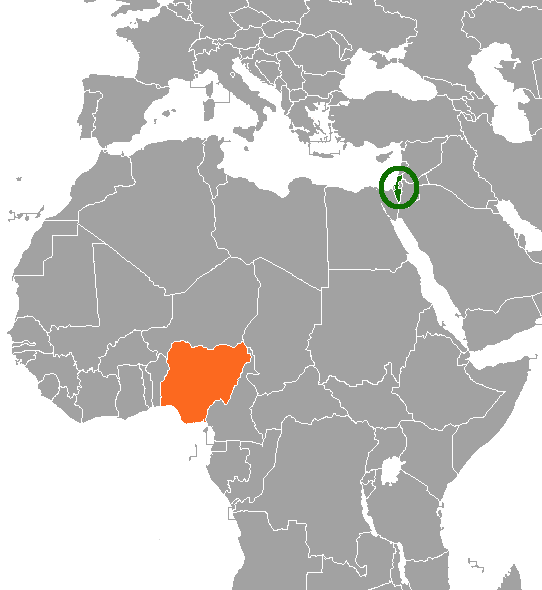

- Israel: Nigeria

Israel–Nigeria relations refers to the bilateral relations between the State of Israel and the Federal Republic of Nigeria. The Nigerian ambassador to Israel is David Oladipo Obasa.

== History ==
=== Early relations (1956–1967) ===
==== Initial contacts (1956–1958) ====
As Israel continued to face isolation in the Middle East and much of Asia, particularly from its exclusion from the 1955 Bandung Conference and the rise of Afro-Asian solidarity, it turned to Africa in search of diplomatic allies. Israel positioned itself as a postcolonial nation that had overcome similar developmental challenges to those faced by newly independent African states, and promoted its model of agricultural and technical self-reliance.

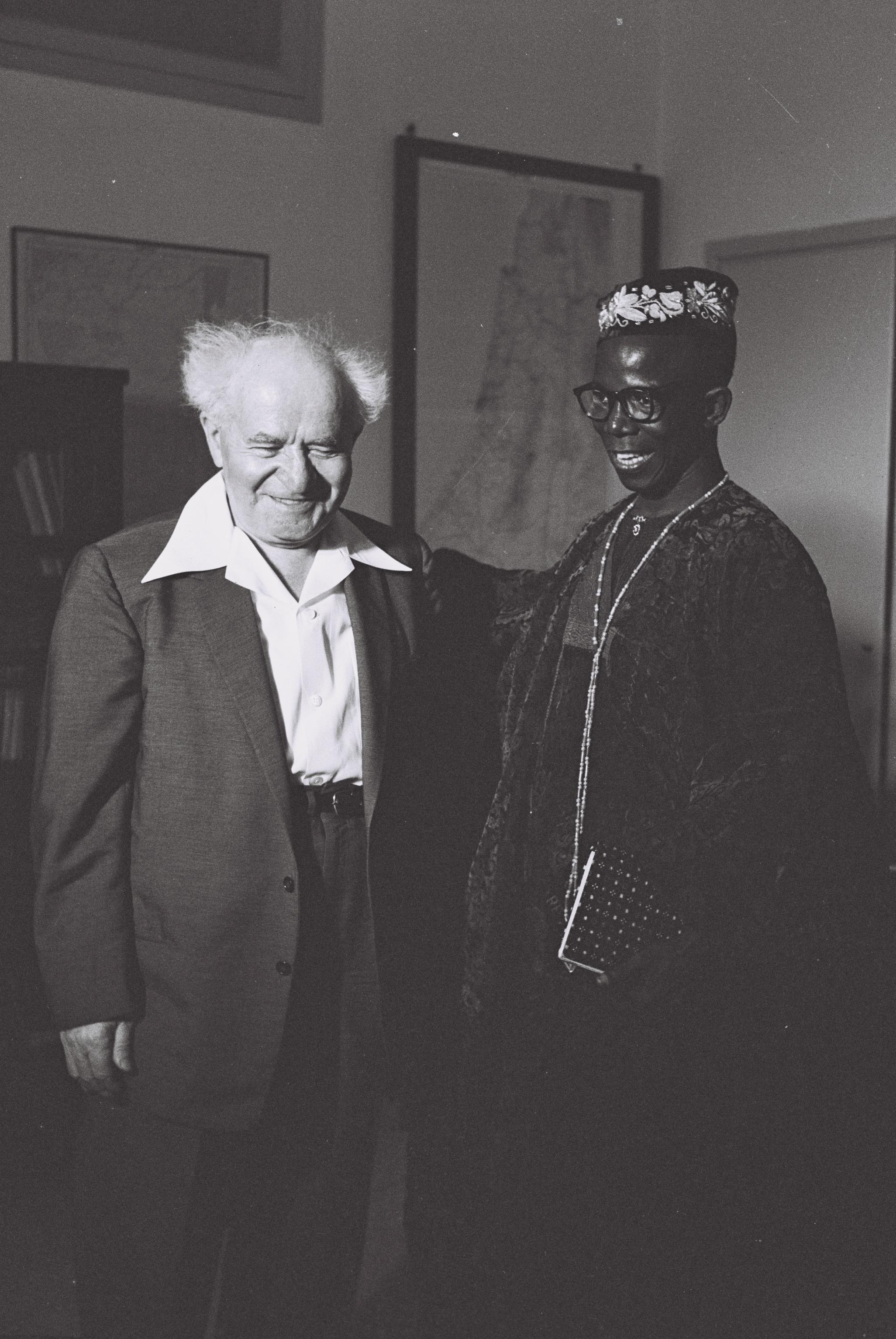
Western Nigeria Minister for Agriculture Akin Deko with Israeli prime minister David Ben-Gurion in Jerusalem, 1958

The first known contact between Nigeria and Israel occurred in 1956 at a dinner party in Accra, Ghana. C D Akran, a politician from Nigeria's Action Group (AG), met Hanan Yavor, at the time, an official from the Israeli Embassy in Ghana. In a private discussion, the two discovered shared political concerns, including opposition to Egyptian President Gamal Abdel Nasser's growing influence in Northern Nigeria. Following this meeting, Yavor expanded contacts with the government of Nigeria's Western Region, particularly with Premier Obafemi Awolowo, leader of the AG. During Yavor's visit to the region, Awolowo discussed the possibility of Israeli assistance in establishing agricultural cooperatives and expressed interest in a joint shipping line between Israel and the Western Region.

Formal relations effectively began in 1958 when a Western Nigerian government delegation, led by Chief Akin Deko, then Minister of Agriculture and Natural Resources, visited Israel. Over the course of that year, ties between Israel and the Western Region strengthened. Various ministries in the region sought and received Israeli assistance in areas such as construction, industrial development, media, and agriculture.

In March 1958, Israeli Foreign Minister Golda Meir visited Nigeria. During her visit, she was officially received by officials in both the Eastern and Western Regions. However, attempts to visit the Northern Region were initially resisted by the ruling Northern People's Congress (NPC) and its Premier, Ahmadu Bello. The NPC relented only after criticism from southern politicians and national press. Meir was ultimately welcomed by Abubakar Tafawa Balewa, then Nigeria's Chief Minister, who reportedly left "an extremely positive impression" on Meir and the Israeli delegation.

==== Shipping line negotiations ====
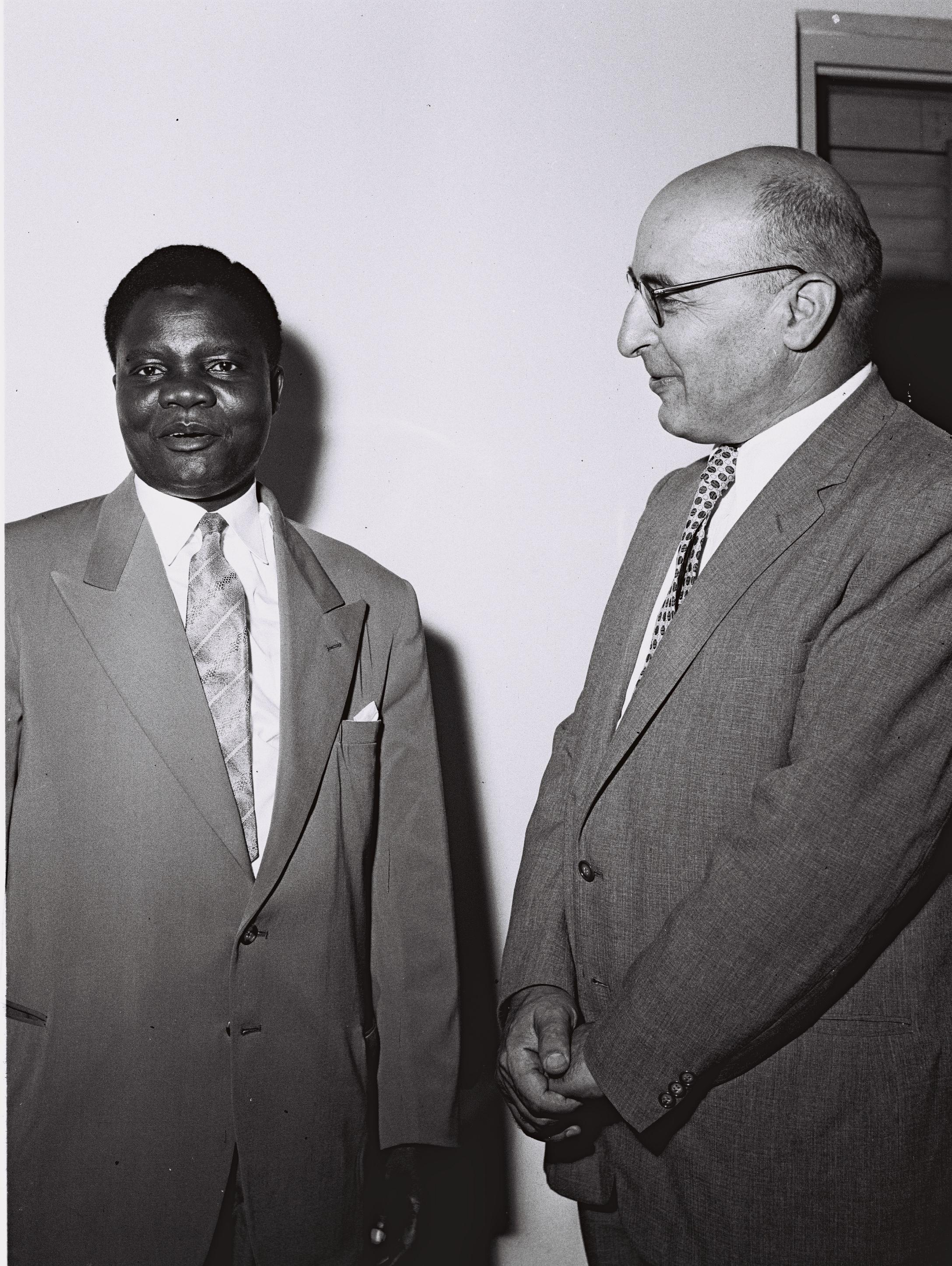
Israeli Minister of Commerce and Industry Pinhas Sapir and Nigerian Minister of Commerce, J U Nwodo, 1959

Some Nigerian politicians, particularly those in the Action Group (AG), viewed the establishment of a national shipping line as essential to achieving economic independence and reducing reliance on former colonial powers. They were frustrated by the dominance of the British-controlled West African Lines Conference (WALCON), which they believed allowed British companies to dictate freight rates and exploit Nigerian trade. A national carrier was seen as a step toward reclaiming economic sovereignty.

Premier Obafemi Awolowo of the Western Region explored the possibility of partnering with Israel to create a joint shipping line, inspired by Israel's collaboration with Ghana through the Black Star Line. The AG planned to present any finalised agreement with Israel to the National Economic Council for national consideration. However, the Federal Minister of Transport, Raymond Njoku of the National Council of Nigeria and the Cameroons (NCNC), was simultaneously negotiating with British companies, including Elder Dempster Lines and Palm Line, which were eager to maintain their interests in Nigerian maritime trade. In November 1958, the federal government announced the formation of the Nigerian National Shipping Line in partnership with these British firms, with Nigerians holding a 51% stake. The federal government explained that partnering with Israel's Zim shipping company was undesirable due to "conflict of interest" concerns and criticism of Zim's operations in London financial circles.

In response, Nnamdi Azikiwe, Premier of Eastern Nigeria and leader of the NCNC, expressed his disappointment in a private meeting with Israeli officials, stating:

Here lies buried our economic independence in shipping. We have replaced one chain of slavery around our neck with another chain of slavery. I am interested in what the Western Region is going to do. If they want to oppose the plan, I will stand with them against the Federal Government.

Although no alliance between the Eastern and Western Regions on the shipping issue ultimately materialised, the incident convinced Awolowo and the AG that federal channels could not be relied upon to achieve regional economic goals. According to historian Lynn Schler, this marked a turning point, leading the AG to pursue alternative strategies, including informal foreign partnerships, to advance their regional development agenda.

==== 1959 election, joint corporations and the AG Farm Settlement Scheme ====
Following the 1957 Constitutional Conference, which allocated more than half of the seats in Nigeria's Federal House of Representatives to the Northern Region, concerns emerged within the AG that this would secure long-term parliamentary dominance for the NPC. In response, AG leader Awolowo began mobilising for the 1959 general elections with the aim of counterbalancing the North's influence. During a 1958 visit to Israel by Chief Akin Deko on behalf of the AG, the party discreetly requested financial support for its campaign, appealing to Israeli concerns over Egyptian President Nasser's growing ideological influence in Northern Nigeria.

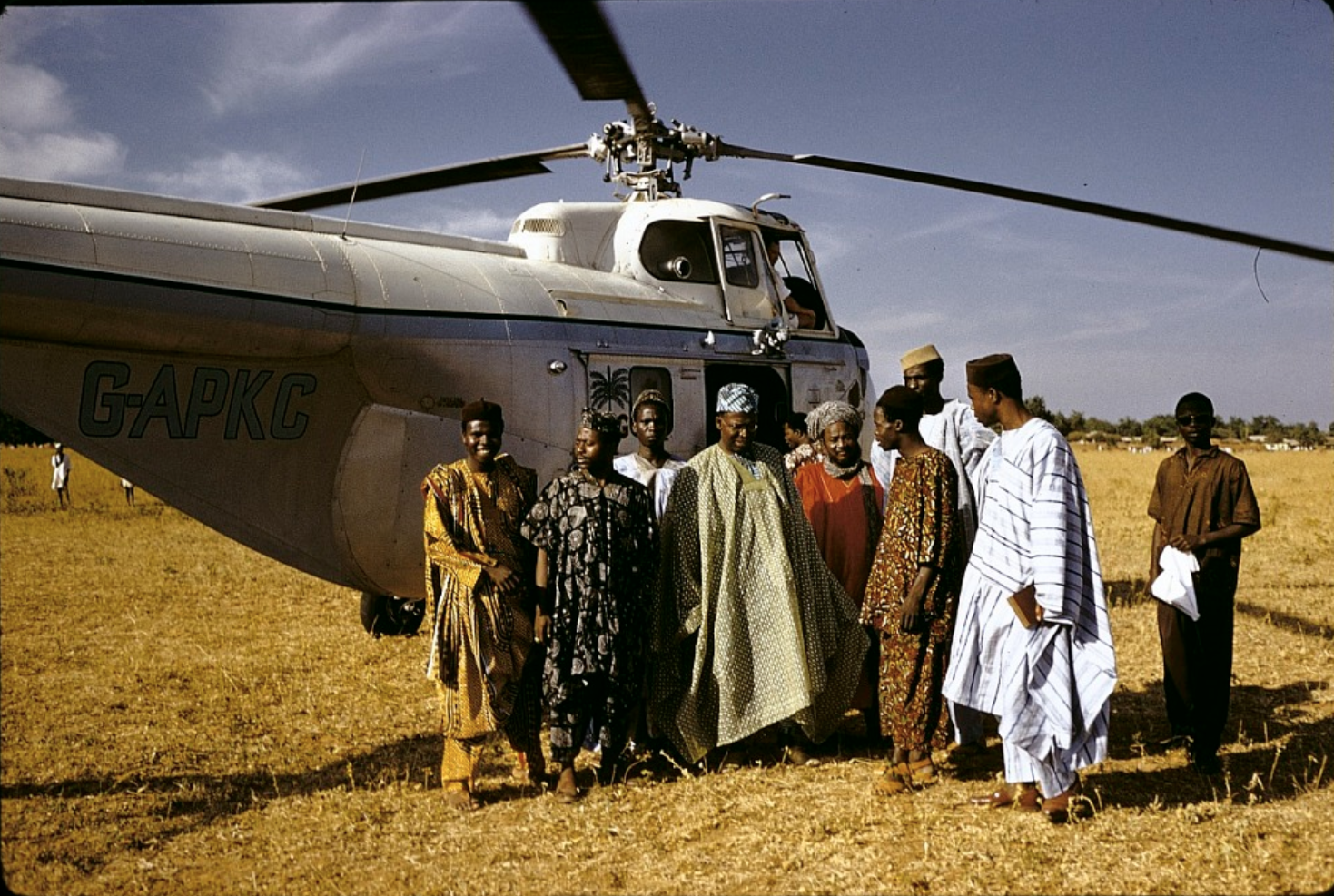
Obafemi Awolowo campaigning in Sokoto

In response, Israel agreed to provide indirect assistance, viewing the alliance as a strategic opportunity to deepen commercial and diplomatic ties with the Western Region. This arrangement led to the creation of two joint Israeli–Nigerian development corporations: Nigersol and the Water Resources Development Corporation (WRD). Established in early 1959, these companies were publicly framed as regional development initiatives but also served as covert mechanisms for channeling support to the AG's election efforts.

Through Israeli funding, Awolowo's 1959 campaign "was the most ambitious and flashy campaign ever seen in Africa." The AG's logistical advantage was evident, deploying more land rovers, buses, jeeps, cars, motorcycles, and bicycles than all other parties combined. Its famously made use of helicopters, which allowed the party leadership to cover significantly more ground and hold numerous meetings, extending well beyond their base in the Western Region. For many Nigerians, this was their first time seeing a helicopter, and the spectacle left a lasting impression on the electorate. At the same time, the AG government launched the Farm Settlement Scheme, modeled after Israel's moshav system, with technical assistance from Israeli experts. While intended to modernise agriculture and address rural unemployment, the scheme also served as a campaign tool, promising development in exchange for electoral support. Its wide geographic distribution, meant to appeal to every district, undermined its efficiency. Public association of the scheme with Israeli expertise reinforced perceptions among rival parties, particularly the NPC, that Israel was politically aligned with the AG. This complicated Israel's broader diplomatic efforts in Nigeria and contributed to its image as a partisan actor.

==== 1960 loan agreement ====
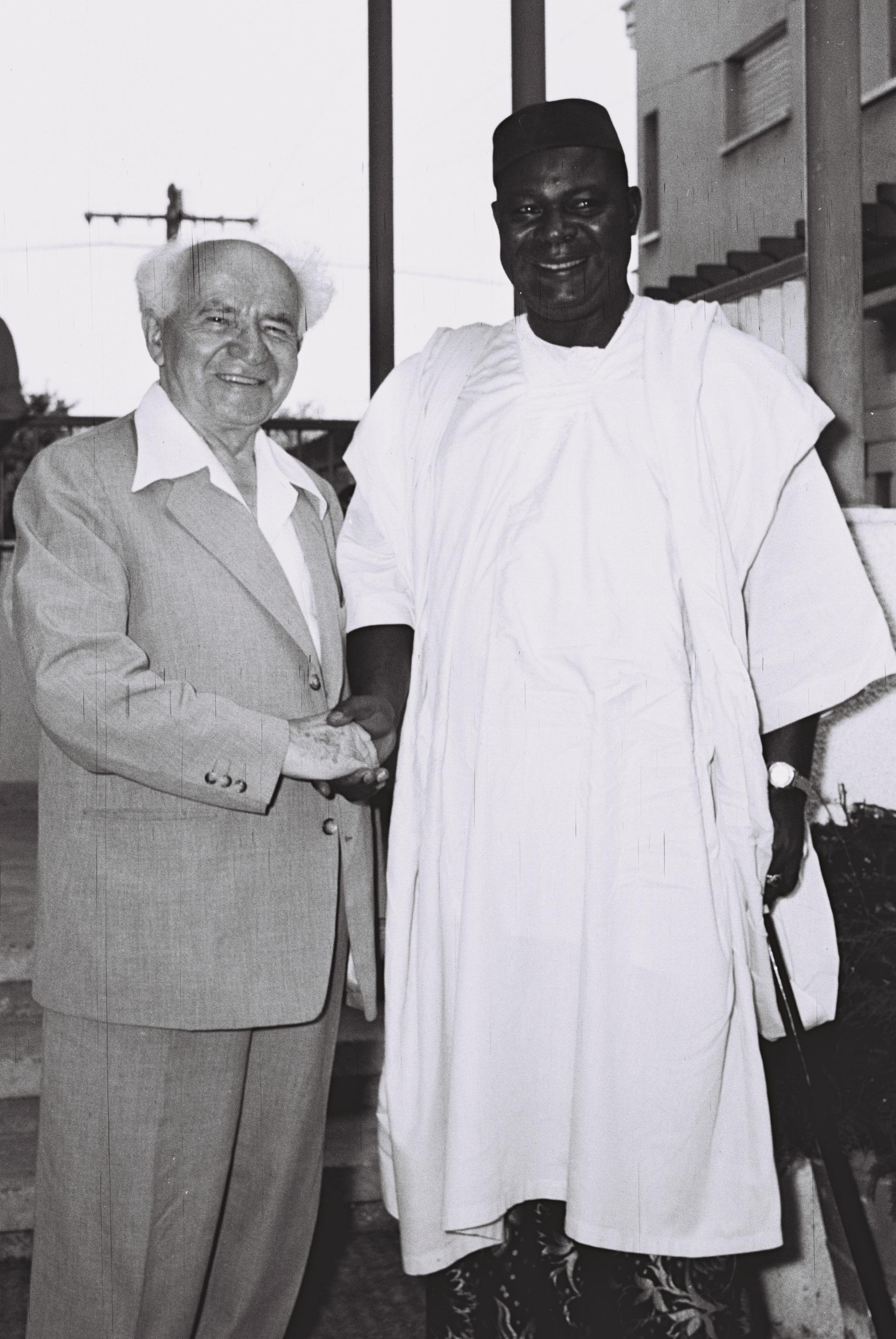
Finance Minister of Nigeria Festus Okotie-Eboh with Israeli Prime Minister David Ben Gurion in Tel Aviv, 1959

Despite efforts at secrecy, the "special relationship" became an open secret, which immediately caused significant political consequences for Israel, particularly after the AG failed to stop the NPC from holding majority of the seats in parliament. Politicians from both parties confronted Israeli representatives about alleged interference, with Prime Minister Tafawa Balewa warning Israel's consul, Shlomo Argov, that "Where there is smoke, there is fire and I want to repeat what I have already told your ambassador in Ghana: We will not tolerate any interference in our internal affairs." In an effort to demonstrate neutrality, Israel sought closer ties with the ruling NPC-NCNC coalition.

Nigerian Finance Minister Festus Okotie-Eboh approached Israel for a £3 million development loan. Eager to improve its standing with the federal government and gain access to the Muslim-majority North, Israel agreed, despite its limited resources at the time. Israeli Finance Minister Pinhas Sapir noted the loan could improve relations with both the NPC and the Eastern Region. Okotie-Eboh also facilitated Israel's request to open an embassy in Lagos. The loan agreement was announced on 14 June 1960, with plans for Israeli Foreign Minister Levi Eshkol to sign it during an official visit in July.

The announcement sparked immediate backlash. The NPC condemned the agreement as "unfortunate" and claimed it had been made without their consent, demanding its cancellation and threatening a no-confidence vote over plans to open an Israeli embassy. Prime Minister Balewa publicly defended the deal, asserting the federal government's right to borrow money from external sources. Many NCNC members also voiced support for the agreement. The federal government approved the loan on 17 July 1960. Upon independence in October, Nigeria formally recognised the State of Israel, allowing Israel to open its embassy in Lagos.

==== 1962 Coker Commission of Inquiry ====
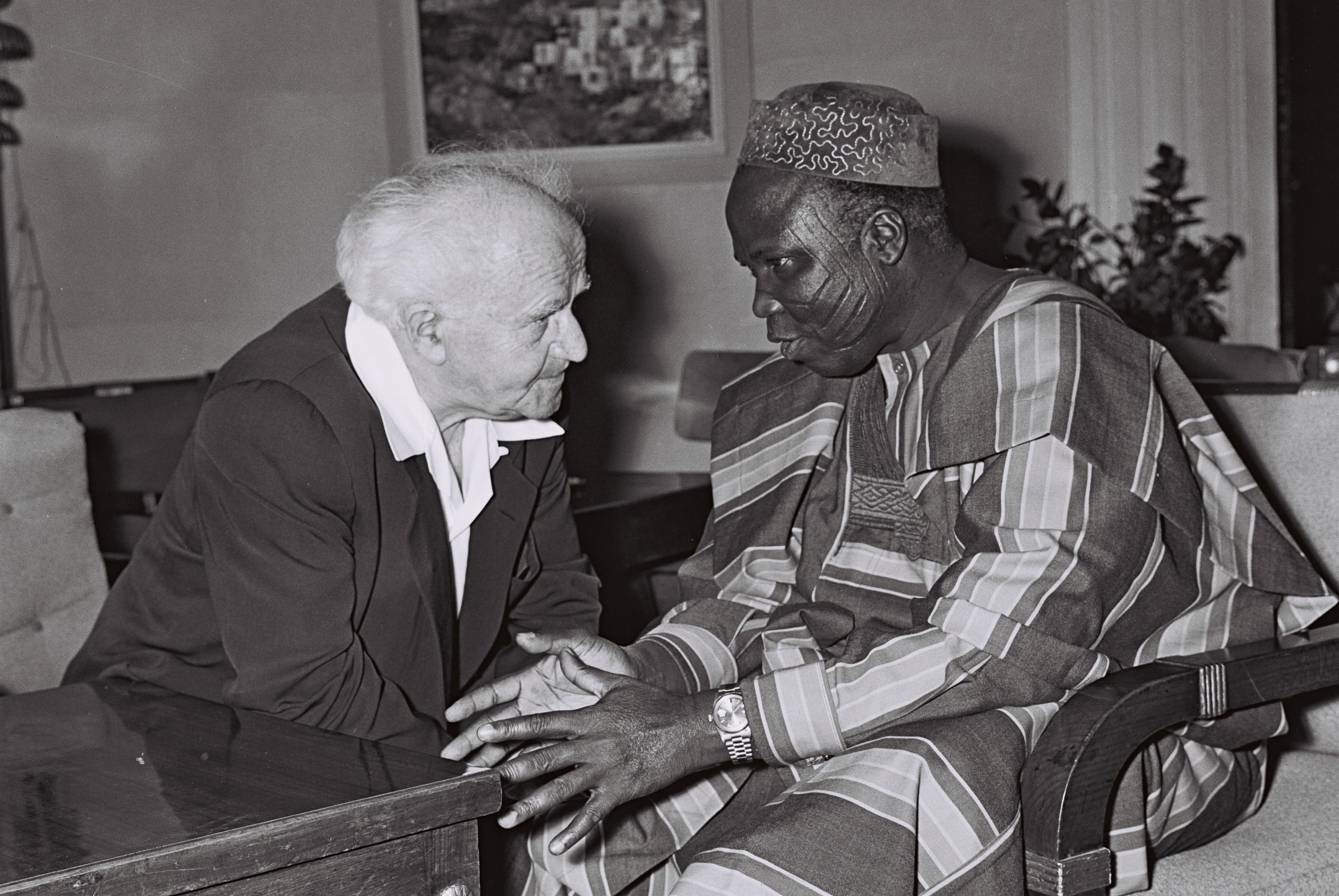
Premier of Western Nigeria S L Akintola with Israeli Prime Minister David Ben Gurion in Jerusalem, 1961

In early 1962, the Nigerian federal government established the Coker Commission of Inquiry, led by Judge G B A Coker, to investigate allegations of financial misconduct involving statutory corporations in the Western Region. At the center of the inquiry were two joint Nigerian–Israeli companies, Nigersol and the Water Resources Development Corporation (WRD), originally created to facilitate development and indirectly support the AG. The investigation came amid an internal leadership crisis within the AG, which split the party between Awolowo and his deputy, Samuel Ladoke Akintola, an ally of the NPC.

Israeli diplomats, led by Ambassador Hanan Yavor, sought to limit the political fallout by working behind the scenes to shield Israeli involvement. Efforts included rebranding the corporations as "Nigerian" rather than "Israeli," discouraging the appearance of Israeli witnesses, and controlling the public narrative. As the AG fractured, Israel increasingly shifted its alignment toward the federal NPC–NCNC coalition, distancing itself from Awolowo's faction in an effort to preserve diplomatic and commercial interests.

While the commission was ongoing, both Awolowo and Alfred Rewane, director of the joint corporations, were charged with treason. The final report of the Coker Inquiry ultimately assigned blame to Rewane and Awolowo for the illicit financial transactions, with little condemnation of the Israelis. Akintola was later reinstated as premier of the Western Region. Although Israel managed to protect its broader image, the inquiry threatened the financial viability of Nigersol and WRD. Okotie-Eboh facilitated financial transfers to the Israeli joint corporations using federal funds, mostly from the 1960 Israeli loan. In return, Akintola requested a sworn statement from Yavor discrediting Rewane's testimony, which had implicated him in the misuse of party funds through the Israeli-linked corporations.

==== Relations with the Northern Region ====
With regard to the impression that the Muslim north is not within the realm of possibilities for us: In fact, it is precisely because most of the Northern region are Muslims that this region is so important to us. We must double and triple our efforts to reach out to them. We fully reject the claim that every Muslim is automatically our enemy.

— Golda Meir, 1957

During Nigeria's First Republic (1960–1966), relations between Israel and Northern Nigeria were characterised by open hostility and discreet diplomatic engagement. Leaders of the Northern People's Congress (NPC), particularly its head Ahmadu Bello, the Premier of the Northern Region, were firmly opposed to Israel. Unlike regional leaders such as Michael Okpara of the Eastern Region, who once declared himself "almost an Israelite," Bello routinely condemned Israel, labeling it an imperialist aggressor, denying its legitimacy, and expressing pride in the absence of Israeli visitors to the North. This stance was rooted in the North's alignment with Arab and Islamic states, informed by religious solidarity, concern for pilgrimage routes to Mecca, and suspicion of Israeli ties to domestic rivals such as the Action Group and the Northern Elements Progressive Union. Israel, however, seeking to counter Arab influence in Africa, viewed engagement with the North as a strategic priority.

Despite public resistance, Israeli diplomats, particularly Ambassador Yavor, pursued backchannel efforts to establish ties, often offering technical and agricultural assistance. These efforts found cautious support among NPC ministers based in Lagos, such as Zanna Bukar Dipcharima and Muhammadu Ribadu, who were open to pragmatic cooperation. Their quiet cooperation revealed internal divisions within the NPC on foreign policy and enabled limited, informal engagement with Israel. A breakthrough appeared possible in September 1960, when Israeli Minister Moshe Dayan met with Bello, who, while critical, left the door open for future engagement. Yavor followed up with visits to the North in January 1961 and August 1962, during which he met both regional ministers and Bello. These meetings showed signs of improvement, with discussions focused on technical assistance and agricultural cooperation.

However, relations remained fragile and were repeatedly derailed by political incidents, notably the 1960 loan agreement. A major turning point came in April 1961 during the United Nations vote on the Northern Cameroons. Nigeria supported Resolution 1604 on Palestinian refugees, a resolution Israel opposed, while Israel voted against Resolution 1608, which proposed integrating the Northern Cameroons into Nigeria. For Northern leaders, who regarded the territory as historically and culturally linked to Nigeria, this was seen as a betrayal. The fallout was swift. Premier Bello denounced Israel during a Middle East tour, reaffirming Northern Nigeria's rejection of ties and vowing to block Israeli involvement in regional development.

Commercial ties nonetheless developed quietly, with Israeli firms like Dizengoff West Africa negotiating with Northern officials. The January 1966 military coup and the Bello's assassination marked a turning point, with some Israelis viewing his removal as an opportunity to reset relations with the North.

=== 1967–present ===
During the Nigerian Civil War, although both sides acquired weapons from Israel, Israel lent assistance to Biafran rebels in addition to providing humanitarian assistance to Biafra.

During the 1960s and early 1970s, Israel played a significant role in the development of Sub-Saharan Africa, including Nigeria. Hundreds of Israeli experts and volunteers were sent to help in the development and modernization of agriculture, education, medicine and technology training. Israeli Moshe "Jerry" Beit Halevi was Nigeria's first football coach following independence. His spell reflected the close ties between Nigeria's Southern and the Western regions with Israel, alongside the tensions between Nigeria's Northern region with Israel. The coverage of his games in the press reflected the deep divisions that plagued Nigeria during the first republic. At the same time, hundreds of Nigerian farmers, experts, educators, academicians, students, doctors, community workers and engineers were trained in Israel.

After the Yom Kippur War in 1973, Nigeria severed diplomatic ties with Israel. Diplomatic relations were restored in September 1992.

Since April 1993, Israel has maintained an embassy in Abuja and Nigeria has an embassy in Tel Aviv. Over fifty Israeli companies operate in Nigeria in the spheres of construction, infrastructure, hi-tech, communications and IT, agriculture and water management. In turn, there are over 5,000 Nigerian companies and organizations that operate in Israel. Trade and commerce are promoted by the Israeli Export and International Cooperation Institute, the Nigerian-Israeli Chamber of Commerce (NICC) and the Israel-Africa Chamber of Commerce.

In 2006, a Nigerian-Israeli Business Forum was inaugurated in Abuja. That year, the Ministries of Foreign Affairs of both countries signed a Memorandum of Understanding (MOU) in which Israel and Nigeria agreed to consult on issues of bilateral relations and other regional and international issues of mutual interest. The first round of consultations took place in Jerusalem in November 2006.

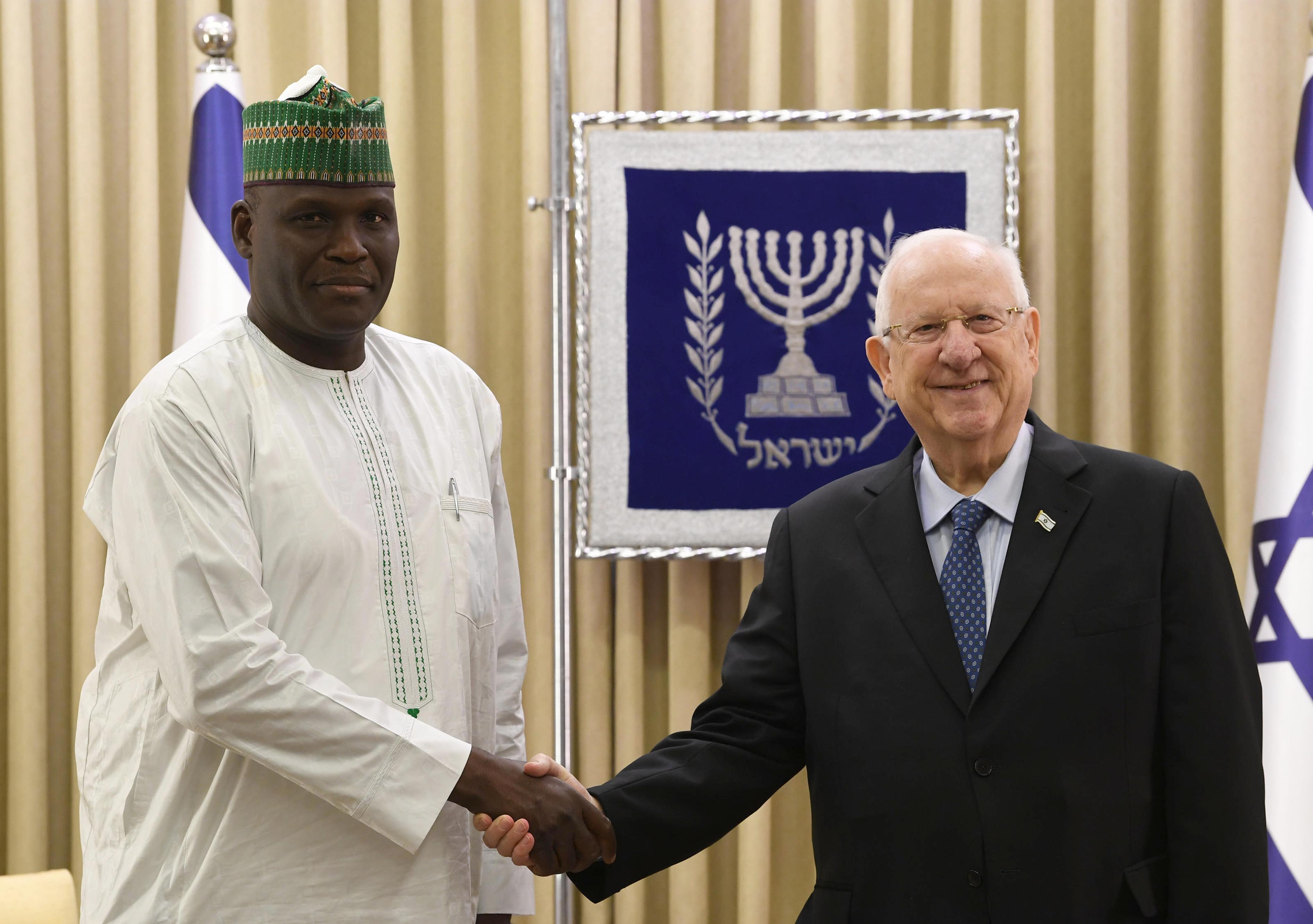
Reuven Rivlin receives the credentials of the Nigerian ambassador to Israel, 2021

In 2013, then president Goodluck Jonathan became the first Nigerian President to visit the State of Israel. He had gone on a pilgrimage and signed bilateral air service agreements with Prime Minister Benjamin Netanyahu.

In June 2014 during the kidnapping of Israeli teens, before they were found murdered, then Nigeria's President Goodluck Jonathan wrote to Israel's Netanyahu: "... I assure you that we are in solidarity with you, as we believe that any act of terrorism against any nation or group is an act against our common humanity. We unequivocally condemn this dastardly act, and demand that the children are released unconditionally by their abductors."

In 2023, Israeli Transport Minister Miri Regev approved a deal to establish non-stop flights between Nigeria and Israel. Under the agreement, direct flights will be available between Tel Aviv and Abuja operated by the Nigerian airline Air Peace.

The Nigerian government is in collaboration with the Israeli government to bring science, technology and innovation (STI) to the youth of Nigeria in other to reduce the rate of unemployment amongst youth in the nation.

== See also ==
- Foreign relations of Israel
- Foreign relations of Nigeria
- History of the Jews in Nigeria
- International recognition of Israel
