= T. M. Aluko =

Nigerian writer

Timothy Mofolorunso Aluko OBE, OON, (14 June 1918 – 1 May 2010) was a Nigerian civil servant, university professor and novelist.

== Biography ==
T.M. Aluko was born in Ilesha Nigeria, a Yoruba tribal town in the then Western region of the country. He studied at Government College, Ibadan, and Higher College, Yaba in Lagos. He then studied civil engineering and town planning at the University of London. After completing his studies he returned to Nigeria, where he served as Town Engineer of the Lagos Town Council before becoming Director of Public Works, Permanent Secretary, Ministry of Works and Transport, and Minister of Finance in Western Nigeria.

He departed from civil service in 1966 and pursued a career as an academic in the Department of Civil Engineering at the University of Lagos serving as Senior Research Fellow in Municipal Engineering (1966-1978), where he formalized his decades of field research with the public works department into higher academic degrees; Master of Science Thesis (1969) at the University of Lagos; and PhD, Municipal Engineering (1976) from Newcastle University. He retired from academia as Associate Professor of Public Health Engineering (1978) at the University of Lagos.

He joined the United Kingdom civil engineering firm, Scott Wilson Kirkpatrick & Partners (1979-1988), as its leading Nigeria expert lending his immense structural and municipal expertise as a consultant and senior engineer. His official publications from his engineering career were primarily published under academic journals, public works reports, and formal conference proceedings, rather than standard corporate memos.

Key Engineering & Sanitation Papers

- "The Case for Waterborne Sanitation in Western Nigeria" (1970–1971): This became one of Aluko's most widely cited technical papers. Presented during his transition into academic consulting, it argued that rapidly growing West African cities could no longer rely on primitive night-soil collection systems. The paper laid out the structural engineering feasibility, piping logistics, and economic justifications for municipal waterborne sewage networks.
- "Problems of Urban Water Supply in Western Nigeria": A public works paper outlining the stark contrast between designing water infrastructure for industrialized European nations versus the reality of tropical climates, intermittent electrical grids, and sudden demographic shifts in Nigeria.
- "Social Engineering and the Civil Engineer": A hybrid paper exploring how infrastructure projects fail if they do not account for local cultural habits, a recurring theme that directly mirrored his creative writing.

His distinguished career as an engineer and public servant paralleled his emergence as one of Nigeria's foremost authors of social satire, where he occupies a distinctive place in Nigerian literature. Unlike many of his contemporaries who emphasized anti-colonial struggles or cultural conflict, Aluko turned his attention to the everyday workings of postcolonial Nigerian society – its bureaucracy, politics, corruption, religion, education and the moral compromises of ordinary people.

He published several novels and short stories written with a distinctly reformist purpose. His fiction examined the tensions of a rapidly changing Africa, exposing the conflicts between tradition and modernity, private morality and public life, and ordinary citizens and the institutions that governed them.

His major novels include; One Man, One Wife (1959), One Man, One Matchet (1964), Kinsman and Foreman (1966), Chief the Honourable Minister (1970) His Worshipful Majesty (1973), and Wrong Ones in the Dock (1982) A State of our Own (1986), are satirical in tone, and deal with the clash of new and old values in a changing Africa, but also satirise the conflict between husband and wife, worker and boss, Christian and non-Christian. In later work he turns his sights on the new African ruling class.

In 1994, he published his autobiography, My Years of Service, an account of his activities as an engineer and university teacher. His later autobiographical book, The Story of My Life, published in 2007, provides a more in-depth look at Aluko's life, expounding on his childhood and his work as a civil servant.

He published his last book, Our Born Again President, in 2009. His work argues that the greatest challenges facing post-independence Africa were often not colonialism itself, but the institutional cultures that emerged afterward.

He was married to Mrs. Janet Adebisi Aluko (nee Fajemisin) and was the father of Dr. Oluwatoyin Aluko (pediatric cardiologist), Mr. Adesheye Aluko (civil engineer, writer, and artist), Dr. Akinyele Aluko (adult cardiologist), Mr. Bankole Aluko SAN (attorney), Mr. Omotokunbo Aluko (electronics engineer), and Mr. Omotayo Aluko (architect and playwright).

He received several awards and honors, including Officer of the Order of the British Empire (OBE) in 1963 and Officer, Order of the Niger (OON), in 1964. T. M. Aluko died on 1 May 2010 in Lagos, aged 91.
