= Akinola Deko =

Nigerian politician (1913–1987)

Gabriel Akinola Deko
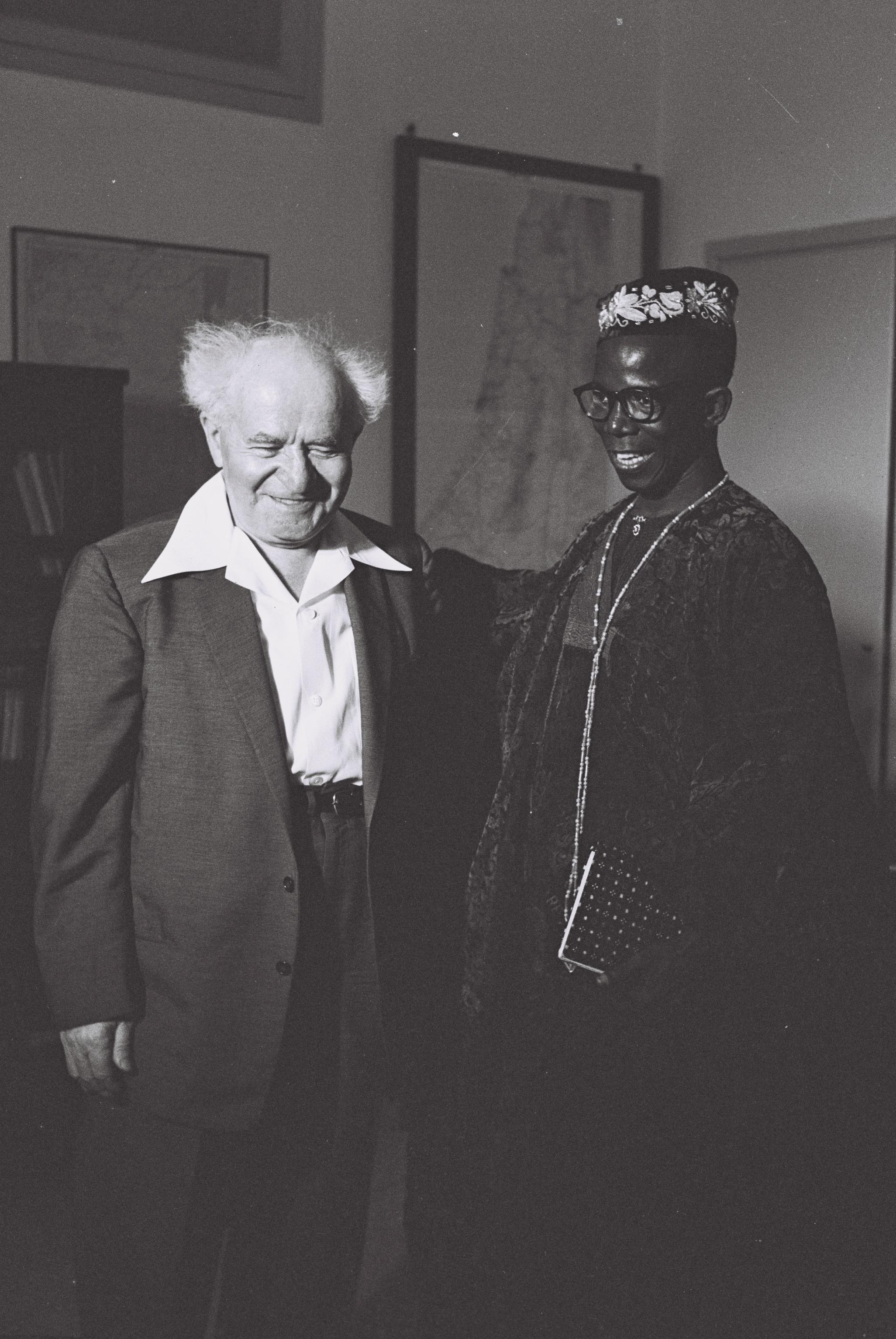
- Gabriel Akinola Deko with Israeli prime minister David Ben-Gurion in Jerusalem, 1958

Regional Minister for Agriculture
- In office 1957–1963
- Premier: Obafemi Awolowo; Ladoke Akintola
- Preceded by: Augustus Akinloye
- Succeeded by: Sanya Onabamiro

Personal details
- Born: 30 October 1913 Igbotu, Southern Nigeria Protectorate (now in Ondo State, Nigeria)
- Died: 5 November 1987 (aged 74) London, England
- Party: Action Group, National Party of Nigeria
- Spouse: Chief (Mrs) Caroline Ebun Akin-Deko
- Profession: Building contractor

Gabriel Akinola Deko// (30 October 1913 – 5 November 1987) was a Nigerian building contractor and former regional Minister for Agriculture in the Western region of Nigeria, he was also a personal friend of Awolowo. As minister, he was involved in the promotion of an agriculture settlement scheme that would employ and pay an initial amount of capital to new graduates from an established agriculture training college. The graduates would engage in farming. This settlement scheme was borrowed from an Israeli agriculture development scheme, Moshav. The scheme was partly initiated to arrest a tide in the movement of young men and women to the urban areas where farming is hardly a career choice.

== Life ==
Akin Deko was born in Igbotu, Ondo State, Nigeria by an Idanre parent. He attended St Peters, Lagos, for primary education and for secondary education, he went to Government College Ibadan (GCI), he completed his studies in Nigeria at the Yaba Higher College in Lagos where he obtained a teaching certificate. He started work as a teacher at the Government College, in Ibadan, teaching mechanics and applied mathematics.

In a few years, he developed an interest in building and in 1947 went to the Brixton School of Building in London. He later started his own building contracting firm. However, in the 1950s, he was persuaded by his friend, Obafemi Awolowo to join politics and in 1956, he heeded Awolowo's advice and contested and won a seat to the regional House of Assembly, from where he was made regional Minister for Agriculture.

Later in his career, he was the African regional representative at the Food and Agriculture Organization and he was also the pioneer Pro-chancellor of the Federal University of Technology, Akure. He also served as the Pro Chancellor of University of Ibadan and the University of Benin.
