= Dauda Soroye Adegbenro =

Nigerian politician

Alhaji Oloye Dauda Soroye Adegbenro
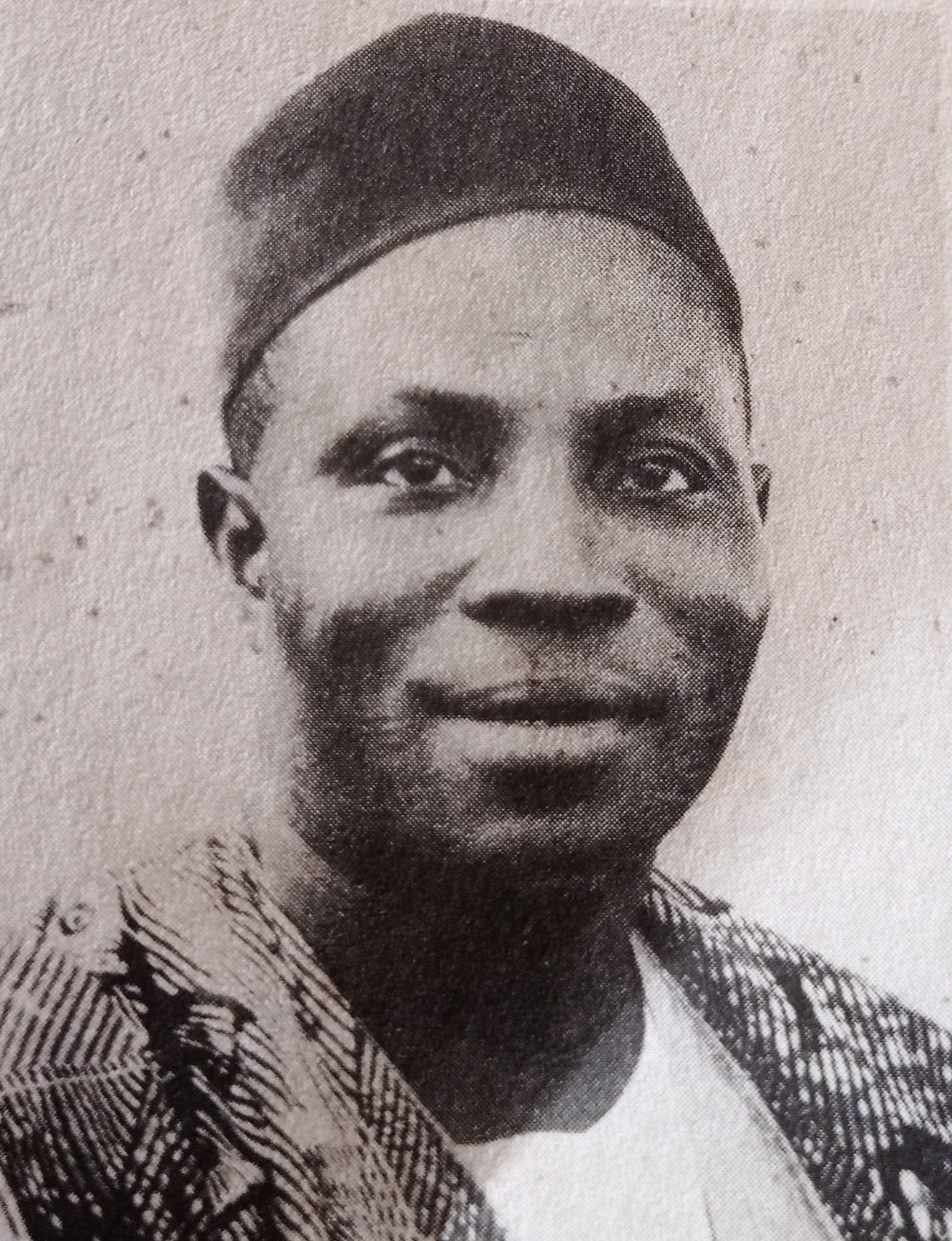
- Born: 1909; Ago-Owu
- Died: 1975 (aged 65–66)

Alhaji Oloye, Dauda Soroye Adegbenro (1909-1975) was a Nigerian politician, a national leader of the Action Group (AG) Party and Minister of Land and Labour. He was revered by his people in Abeokuta, who conferred on him the chieftaincy titles of Balogun of Owu Egba and Ekerin of Egbaland.

== Early life ==
He was born in 1909 in Ago-Owu, Abeokuta, Ogun State. Dauda Soroye Adegbenro attended African School, Owowo for his primary education before proceeding to Baptist Boys High School, Abeokuta and Abeokuta Grammar School for his secondary education.

== Career ==
He began his career with the Nigerian Railway Corporation as a clerk from 1930 to 1937. After that, he worked as a storekeeper with the United African Company.

== Politics ==
Adegbenro did not join active politics until the 1940s. It was then that he joined the ranks of Awolowo, Akintola and others in launching the Action Group party in April 1951. The party contested the 1951 elections to the Western Region House of Assembly but lost most of the seats to the National Council of Nigeria and the Cameroons (NCNC) that was led in the Region by Adegoke Adelabu. Though the election results favoured the NCNC, post-elections defections gave the AG the majority.

Adegbenro, notwithstanding, was easily elected because of his popularity in local Egba politics. Not quite long, he was selected by the Regional Assembly as one of its representatives in the Federal House of Representatives in Lagos. He returned to the Western Region House of Assembly in 1954 to serve as Parliamentary Secre to the Minister of Justice and later as Minister of Land and Labour and then Minister of Local Government. He was an able, trusted and articulate administrator. He built an intimate partnership with his party and government leaders, particularly Chief Awolowo who was then Premier of the Region. He was to remain a devoted collaborator of the Chief even when the latter moved unto national plane as Opposition Leader in the Federal House of Representatives.

Following the Action Group Crisis that plunged the Western Nigeria into deep political crisis which subsequently engulfed the whole county, Adegbenro was suspended from office in the ensuing military coup of 1966. He led the Action Group when Awolowo and other leaders of the party were imprisoned.

During the Nigerian Civil War, he was Minister for Trade and Industry. He withdrew from politics in 1971. He died in 1975

== Descendants ==
Popular Nigerian Alte artist Odunsi the Engine is his grandson

Adeboye Adegbenro also known as boye gbenro, (BG) a popular cartoonist, animator, instructor, and musician is his son.
