= Augustus Akinloye =

Federal minister of Nigeria; lawyer (1916–2007)

Chief Augustus Meredith Adisa Akinloye // (August 19, 1916 – September 18, 2007), popularly known as A.M.A, was a Nigerian lawyer, politician and the Seriki of Ibadanland, thus making him a Yoruba tribal aristocrat.

== Legal career ==
Akinloye read law at the London School of Economics between 1946 and 1948. Upon his return to Nigeria, he briefly worked as a lawyer before venturing into politics.

== First Republic ==
Akinloye was instrumental to the formation of the first ever political party in Ibadan called Ibadan Peoples Party (IPP) which he served as its president, with Adegoke Adelabu as his deputy. His IPP party later merged with the Action Group, led by Chief Obafemi Awolowo, to form the first government in the Western Region of Nigeria, in which Akinloye was appointed the Minister of Agriculture and Natural Resources. During the second half of the 1950s he was elected Chairman of Ibadan City Council.

During the Western Region crisis in the early 1960s, he left the Action Group for Chief Samuel Ladoke Akintola's newly formed Nigerian National Democratic Party and served in the cabinet led by the then Prime Minister, Abubakar Tafawa Balewa. (The government was overthrown in a military coup on 15 January 1966.)

== Second Republic ==
Akinloye was the Chairman of the then-largest political party in Africa, the National Party of Nigeria, which ruled the country between 1979 and 1983 while Shehu Shagari was President. Akinloye went into exile in 1983 after his party was overthrown by the military government headed by General Muhammadu Buhari and returned to Nigeria after ten years when the interim government led by Chief Ernest Shonekan was in place.

== Personal life ==
The Oloye Akinloye was married and had multiple children. He died at age 91 in his home town on September 18, 2007 after a brief illness.
