= Yaba College =

Former vocational college, located in yaba Nigeria

Yaba Higher College
- Active: 1932–1948
- Location: Yaba, Lagos, Nigeria; 6.518615°N 3.37423°E

Yaba Higher College was founded in 1932 in Yaba, now a suburb of Lagos in Nigeria to provide tertiary education to Africans, mostly in vocational subjects and teaching. The college staff were transferred to start the University College, Ibadan in 1948 and the college premises were used for the new Yaba College of Technology.

== Foundation ==
Yaba Higher College the brainchild of E. R. J. Hussey, who became Director of Education in Nigeria in 1929. Soon after arriving, he proposed a higher college at Yaba similar to the Makerere College in Uganda, his previous posting. The goal was at first to train assistants for government departments and private firms, with a gradual increase in standards until eventually the college would reach the level of a British university. Hussey gained acceptance of the plan, starting with a "special medical school at King's College". By 1932 the school had its own building - a temporary hut - and other courses were added.

The college at Yaba was an all-male residential institute. It was officially opened in January 1934. It provided vocational training in subjects that included agriculture, forestry, medicine, veterinary science, surveying and civil and mechanical engineering. It also provided training for secondary school teachers, mainly science teachers. Yaba was affiliated with the University of London. The college offered limited diplomas, so Nigerians who wanted higher education either had to go abroad or earn external degrees from the University of London through correspondence courses.

Educated Nigerians were vocally critical of Yaba College. Four days after the college opening, the Nigerian Daily Times described it as "a grand idea, and imposing structure, resting on rather weak foundations". Noting the low standards of the Middle Schools, whose graduates would enter Yaba, the Daily Times said "..we wish to declare emphatically that this country will not be satisfied with an inferior brand [of education] such as the present scheme seems to threaten". The Nigerian Youth Movement, formed by members of the Lagos intelligentsia who were protesting the plan for Yaba College, soon became an important nationalist organization.

== Evolution ==
Starting in 1935 there was growing official pressure to have northerners attend Yaba Higher College. In 1939 the Director of Education, Morris, proposed that Yaba should train future northern middle school teachers. The Chief Commissioner was also concerned that northerners obtain education at Yaba sufficient to qualify them for civil service positions to avoid the risk of southerners establishing a monopoly on such posts. Other officials considered that the training available to northerners at Kaduna College was equivalent, if not superior in some subjects, and would be cheaper.

Due to the limitations of the Yaba College curriculum throughout its existence, most Nigerians who were qualified for university-level education attended Fourah Bay College in Sierra Leone or, if they were from a wealthy family, attended a university in the USA or the United Kingdom. In 1948 Yaba College was moved to a location further north, becoming the University College of Ibadan. The Yaba College of Technology, founded in 1947, was the successor to Yaba Higher College, and became the second post-secondary educational institute after the University of Ibadan.

== Notable alumni ==
- T. M. Aluko, Novelist
- Ishaya Audu, Minister of External Affairs (Foreign Minister) from 1979 to 1983 under Shehu Shagari
- Stephen Oluwole Awokoya, minister of education in the old Western Region of Nigeria
- Olumbe Bassir, Sierra Leonean scientist and academic
- Saburi Biobaku, scholar and historian, pro-chancellor of the Obafemi Awolowo University.
- Akintola Deko, Minister for Agriculture in the Western region of Nigeria
- Joseph Chike Edozien, traditional ruler of Asaba, Nigeria in Delta State
- Erediauwa, Oba of Benin
- Samuel Fawehinmi, pioneering Nigerian furniture magnate
- Eni Njoku, First Vice-Chancellor of the University of Lagos and later Vice-Chancellor of the University of Nigeria
- Michael Okpara, Premier of Eastern Nigeria during the First Republic, from 1959 to 1966
- Sanya Dojo Onabamiro, the first person awarded a PhD in any colonial university; later a Minister for Education and Minister for Agriculture in the Western Region
- Ayo Rosiji, politician, statesman and former Minister for Health and Minister of Information
- Shehu Shagari, President of the Nigerian Second Republic (1979–1983)
- Tunji Sowande, Nigeria-born UK lawyer and musician
- Jaja Wachuku, first Nigerian Ambassador and Permanent Representative to the United Nations
- Akintola Williams, chartered accountant, founder of the Nigerian Stock Exchange and the Institute of Chartered Accountants of Nigeria
- Frederick Rotimi Williams, the first Nigerian to become a Senior Advocate of Nigeria
