= Charles Akindiji Akinola =

Nigerian politician

Charles Akindiji Akinola (born July 1956) is a Nigerian government official, businessman and consultant. He is the Chief of Staff to the governor of Osun State, Nigeria. He worked as the director general of the Office of Economic Development and Partnerships in the state of Osun. He was also a team leader in the Osun Rural Enterprise and Agriculture Program (O-REAP). He has advised state and federal Governments in Nigeria regarding the design and structure of International Development Cooperation agreements and protocols as well as the management of a wide range of economic development programs. He has participated in the deliberations of the US Government's Advisory Committee on Voluntary Foreign Aid (ACVFA).

== Career ==
Akinola taught at the University of Ibadan in Nigeria from 1984 until 1989 and was on the training and research faculty of the Pan African Institute for Development (PAID) in Buea, Cameroon 1990.

He was country director of TechnoServe, a US-based international development agency between 1993 and 1998.

He founded and served as the CEO of Enterprise for Development International (EfDI), a development sector market leader based in Lagos, Nigeria between 1999 and 2008.

He was the Nigeria National Coordinator of the Sustainable Tree Crop Program (STCP), a multi-agency, public-private sector effort involving the United States Agency for International Development and the chocolate industry in facilitating the improvement of small holder agricultural systems focusing on cocoa and cashew in West Africa between 2001 and 2005.

He was a founding director of Community Development Foundation (CDF), Nigeria's premier wholesale development finance agency between 1993 and 2006.

=== Consultant ===
He was variously Founding Partner, Hybridea Partnership, a Public Sector Innovation and Strategic Management Consultancy between 2008 and 2010.

He worked at structuring and managing Cross-Sector Partnerships involving Government, Private and Development Sectors in different parts of Nigeria and West Africa and participated in the University of Cambridge, UK program on Cross-Sector Partnerships in 2005 and Public-Private Partnerships at the Harvard Kennedy School between 2009 and 2010.

He has consulted widely across the Public, Private and Development sectors to, governments, the World Bank, the United States Agency for International Development, the Department for International Development, Ford Foundation, Shell International, Chevron Corporation, ExxonMobil and West African Gas Pipeline among others.

He authored research reports, studies and papers focusing on sustainable development and cross-sector partnerships.

Dr Akinola was most recently, Mason Fellow at the Harvard Kennedy School of Government and Fellow at the Harvard Weatherhead Center for International Affairs (WCFIA) where his work focused on Innovation for Economic Development.

=== SWDC ===
On 8 May 2025, President Bola Tinubu appointed Dr Akinola as the pioneer Managing Director of the newly established South West Development Commission.
