= Samuel Fawehinmi =

Samuel Ibitayo Fawehinmi (1912–1998) was a pioneering Nigerian furniture magnate. The son of a trader, he was born in Ondo City. He attended Ondo Boys High School and the Yaba Higher College. He was originally interested in medicine, but the long wait for a pre-medical test, and his gift in wood and metal work changed his occupational direction. He learned civil engineering and became a staff of King's College, Lagos. In 1946, he decided to undergo further formal training in furniture, he traveled abroad and was educated at the Shoreditch Technical College. After returning to Nigeria, with the help of his father and a loan from the Colony Development Board, he opened some furniture factories in Lagos. He was noted as one of the earliest magnates who focused on a single industry instead of the ubiquitous or octopodal group of companies. He was also notable for introducing modern techniques in furniture making.
