= One Man, One Wife =

1959 satire novel by T. M. Aluko

- Author: T.M Aluko
- Language: English
- Genre: Fiction
- Published: 1959
- Publisher: Heinemann
- Publication place: Nigeria
- Media type: Print (paperback)
- ISBN: 0435900307

One Man, One Wife is a 1959 satire novel by Nigerian writer T. M. Aluko. It depicts the contradiction of Yoruba culture and the Christian missionaries. It was published as part of the influential African Writers Series.
