= Kinsman and Foreman =

1966 social novel by T. M. Aluko

- Title page for Kinsman and Foreman (1966)
- Author: T.M. Aluko
- Language: English
- Genre: Literary Fiction
- Published: 1966
- Publisher: Heinemann
- Publication place: Nigeria
- Media type: Print (paperback)
- ISBN: 978-0435900328

Kinsman and Foreman is a 1966 social novel by Nigerian novelist T. M. Aluko. The novel is one of the novels in the Heinemann African Writers Series.Though the civil servant protagonist attempts to resist the corruption in Nigeria, he cannot and is eventually transferred to a remote position for a job. While representing the social corruption of Nigeria, the novel explores topics that build out of Aluko's experience as a civil engineer. Thematically, the novel focuses on the ethics and cultural conflicts that lead to the corruption.
