= Modupe Akinola =

American psychologist (born 1974)

Modupe Nyikoale Akinola
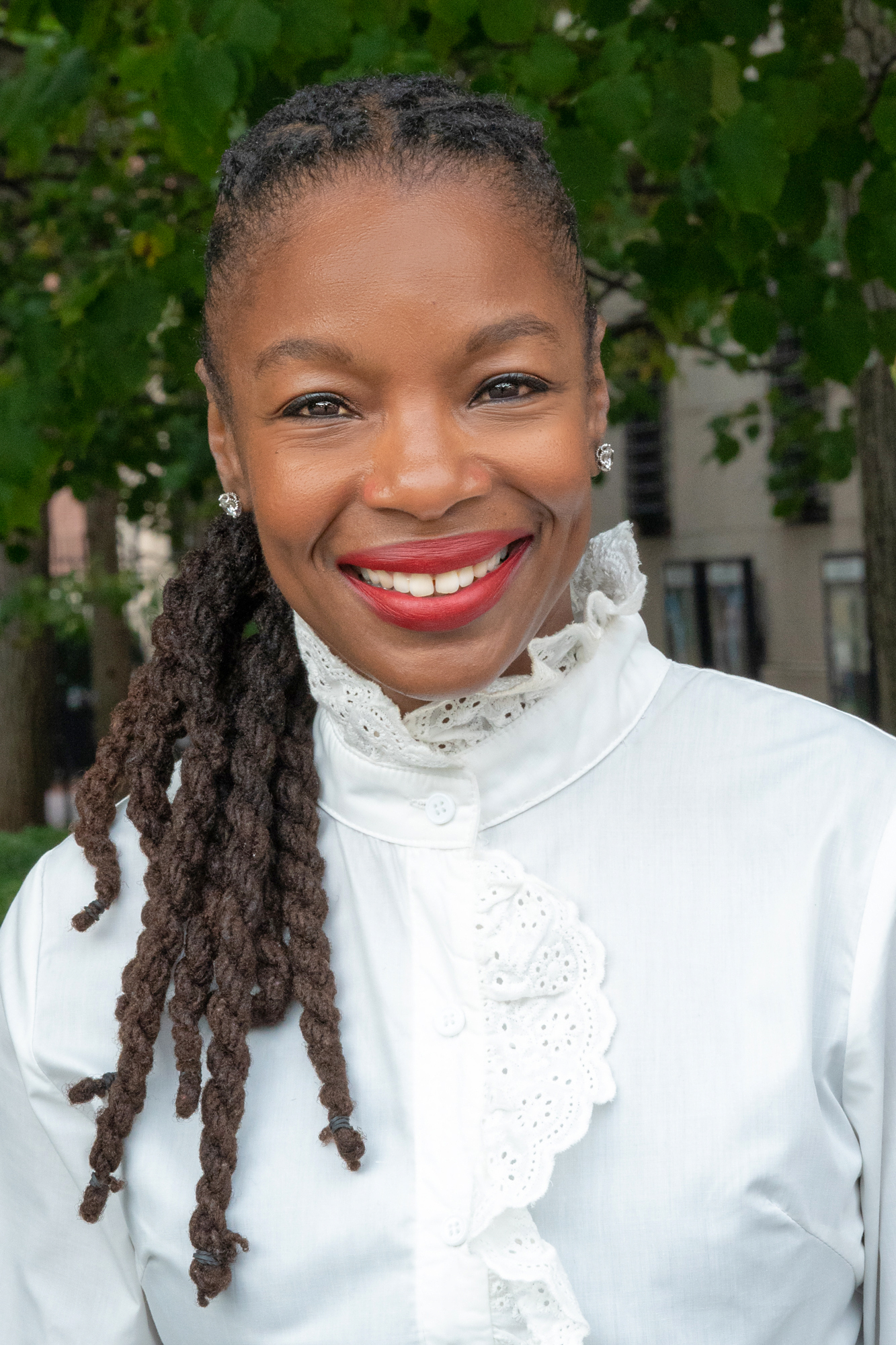
- Born: April 22, 1974 (age 52); New York City, New York, U.S.

Academic background
- Education: Harvard University (BA, MA, MBA, PhD)

Academic work
- Discipline: Psychology; Social psychology; Organizational behavior
- Institutions: Columbia Business School
- Website: www.modupeakinola.com

Modupe Nyikoale Akinola (born April 22, 1974) is an American organizational scholar and social psychologist who examines the science of stress, creativity, and how to maximize human potential in diverse organizations. She is currently the Barbara and David Zalaznick Professor of Business at Columbia Business School, where she is the Director of the Sanford C. Bernstein & Co. Center for Leadership and Ethics.

== Early life ==
Akinola is a second-generation African American and New Yorker who grew up in Spanish Harlem. Her parents were born and raised in West Africa (Ghana, Nigeria, and Togo), immigrating to the U.S. in the late 1960s. She describes her father, a retired hospital-care investigator, and her mother, a retired teacher, as “African hippies” who believed wholeheartedly in the power of education as a great equalizer. She and her two sisters attended The Brearley School, a private all-girls school on the Upper East Side of Manhattan. She credits her early experiences growing up in a predominantly Black environment but attending a predominantly White and educationally rigorous school as critical in shaping her interest in understanding the science of stress and the dynamics of diversity.

== Education ==
Akinola completed a B.A. in psychology, magna cum laude, at Harvard University in 1996. She earned an M.B.A. from Harvard Business School in 2001. She returned to Harvard University in 2004 where she earned an M.A. in social psychology in 2006 and a Ph.D. in organizational behavior in 2009, receiving the Wyss Award of Excellence in Doctoral Research at graduation.

== Business career ==
Akinola's business career began as a student at Harvard College where she was vice president in Harvard Student Agencies, the world's largest student-run company. She went on to work at UNICEF in West Africa, launching an education nonprofit after college in the region. She then joined Bain & Company as an Associate Consultant and continued as a Consultant and Head of Diversity after completing her MBA. Akinola also worked in Investment Banking at Merrill Lynch.

== Academic career ==
Akinola's academic interests began as an undergraduate when she conducted research for the book Breaking Through by her mentor, professor David A. Thomas (now president of Morehouse College). This experience gave Akinola her first exposure to the power innovative research can have on corporations and organizations. While taking a risk to leave a coveted consulting path, Thomas, along with her family, friends, and mentors gave key encouragement and Akinola pursued her Ph.D. guided by the phrase "the courageous are those who are fearful but go anyway."

After earning her Ph.D. in 2009, Akinola joined the faculty of Columbia Business School. She has taught the core leadership course for first-year MBA students and has lectured in executive education programs on topics including leadership development, stress management, and diversity, equity, and inclusion. She is one of the most highly rated business school professors and a leading authority at Columbia Business School and received Columbia Business School's Dean's Award for Teaching Excellence in 2015.

In 2018, Akinola became the first Black professor in Columbia Business School's history to earn tenure. In 2020, she became Faculty Director of the Sanford C. Bernstein & Co. Center for Leadership and Ethics at Columbia Business School.

== Research ==
Akinola's research explores how stress affects workplace performance, including decision making, creativity, and negotiations, and the mechanisms of discrimination—the forces that reduce inclusiveness and inhibit the success of employees from underrepresented groups. She examines how stress can influence the success of employees and give rise to—or ensue from—discrimination. Akinola seeks to identify practical interventions that can reduce their negative influence—for managers, organizations, and policymakers.

=== Stress and performance in organizations ===
Classic research specified broad conditions under which stress may be helpful. For example, stress can improve performance for well-learned versus novel tasks. Akinola's research has probed more specific and organizationally relevant categories of performance, such as tasks that involve complex decision making and demand focused attention—as when police officers need to detect whether a suspect has a gun or when managers are selecting the best creative idea out of many. Additionally, while past work has examined the optimal profile of stress hormones for individual performance, Akinola has explored how the profile of stress hormones on a team affects its performance. Akinola distinguishes between two qualitatively different types of stress responses that can be measured cardiovascularly and hormonally: fluid vs. constrictive stress responses. She identifies conditions that trigger each type of stress response, and she has tested their distinctive effects on performance. She and her colleagues have found that these stress responses can affect health and well-being and have identified practical interventions that help individuals manage stress.

Akinola combines multiple methods and measurements, including hormonal and cardiovascular physiological responses, behavioral observation, and reaction times to understand the effects of stress on cognitive functions.

In addition to her research, Akinola has led workshops to navigate stress including one for California Department of Corrections and Rehabilitation staff after a query from a prison psychologist.

=== Inclusiveness ===
Akinola studies the psychological biases that lead to disparate outcomes for employees. She explores when discrimination is most likely to occur, where it is most pronounced, and how it is evolving. For example, in a field study of discrimination in academia, Akinola and her colleagues find that bias is most likely to emerge in decisions about future rather than present interactions. Other work details how organizational attention to novel axes of diversity, such as cognitive styles and personality traits, can displace efforts focused on traditional dimensions, such as race and gender. Furthermore, Akinola researches about diversity in the recruitment process, specifically about how individuals are hired in order to create more diversity in an organization.

Akinola and colleagues have also found that as organizations have sought to transcend tokenism (i.e., having a single female representative to demonstrate gender diversity), they have converged on a similar bias of having precisely two women in coveted positions. This phenomenon, which she and her collaborators call “twokenism”, is seen in corporate boards and is particularly pronounced for firms under high media scrutiny. Collectively, Akinola's work points to individual—and organizational—level processes and practices that can affect the representation of women and minorities.

=== Research coverage, honors, and awards ===
Akinola has written on the topics of stress and the mechanisms of discrimination in numerous academic journals, and her research has been covered in various media outlets including The New York Times, The Wall Street Journal, National Public Radio, WIRED, Scientific American, Forbes, The Economist, and The Huffington Post. Her co-authored Sunday New York Times op-ed titled "Professors are Prejudiced, Too" (with Dolly Chugh and Katherine Milkman) was one of the top 20 most-emailed/read/tweeted articles the weekend it was published.

Akinola has received numerous awards and honors for her research including Best Graduate Student Paper Award, Society of Personality and Social Psychology (2009), Rising Star Award, Association for Psychological Science (2011), and the Best Paper Award, Academy of Management Journal (2020). She has been named a Massachusetts Institute of Technology Dr. Martin Luther King Jr. Fellow (2013), Society for Personality and Social Psychology Fellow (2021), an Association for Psychological Science Fellow (2020), and was included on the Thinkers50 Radar List of 30 Thinkers to Watch (2022).
