= Salami Agbaje =

Nigerian businessperson

- Born: 1880; Lagos
- Died: 1953 (aged 72–73); Ibadan
- Occupation: Businessman
- Children: Numerous incl. Abdul Ganiyu Agbaje
- Parent(s): Mr Durowoju and Mrs Sinatu

Chief Salami Agbaje (1880–1953) was one of Nigeria's leading businessmen during the nation's colonial era. He was a successful indigenous entrepreneur who found a way to adapt and transform his ambitions into reality within an emerging and foreign Western milieu. He was also Ibadan's richest citizen during his time and used his wealth to open doors to new ventures never before established in the city.

== Early life ==
Agbaje was born in Lagos to the family of Mr Durowoju, an Islamic teacher originally from Iseyin and Mrs Sinatu. He had four other siblings, two boys and two girls. Growing up in an Islamic family, knowledge of the Koran was a step all the children took and at an early age, he learned the Koran along with his brothers and sisters. He later apprenticed under a tailor and learned the art of tailoring. However, he did not last in Lagos, towards the end of the nineteenth century he left for Ibadan to find better opportunities.

== Ibadan ==
Though Ibadan was a new environment for Agbaje, Mrs Sinatu, his mother was a native of the city and she lived there before marrying Mr Durowoju.

In Ibadan, he left the artisan work of a tailor and focused on logging.

=== Business career ===
His first commercial success occurred when he was a timber contractor. The economy of the colonial era was maintained through the combination of importation of manufactured goods for local consumption and the export of agricultural commodities and raw materials. The major merchants involved where mostly expatriates as little credit was extended to indigenous Africans. Railways soon emerged as an important system for the transportation of raw materials from one Nigerian location to another or for export. Agbaje cashed in on the new economy by supplying most of the timber needed for the construction of the Lagos-Ibadan railway in 1871. The timber business soon became his launching pad for greener investment opportunities. He collated the profit from timber contracting and set out to meet with farmers and to seek avenues for produce buying in the Yoruba hinterland. He became a merchant who succeeded in linking and buying goods from the local farmers and selling them to expatriate firms for export. He was also notable for using advertising as a business strategy. His name and business could be seen splashed inside the pages of the Yoruba News in the 1920s. From the produce buying venture, he diversified into transportation and import and export. He imported Cotton, gin and rum, building materials, hats, umbrellas and sewing machines. He was not only a success as an importer but was actually one of the few indigenous importers of his time. He had also risen to the top in Ibadan's social and political circles and pioneered new industries in the city. In Akinpelu Obisesan's diary, Obisesan lamented his laid back lifestyle as one of insolence when he was in company of two Ibadan chiefs, Adebisi Giwa and Salami Agbaje.

Nobody in this town will revere anyone of no means, he would be counted as no man- the great presents made to us forced me to recognize that Messrs Agbaje and Adebisi Giwa are being held in high esteem.

Other pioneering ventures or activities he was involved with in Ibadan includes the first private motor garage in the city and the first truly indigenous owned diversified company, hiring both foreigners and indigenous individuals. He also was the first to establish cinemas.

=== Conflict with Ibadan chiefs ===
As a wealthy Ibadan businessman, he rose rapidly within the ranks of Ibadan chiefs, becoming the Balogun of Ibadan before his death in 1953. However, many prominent chiefs in the city wanted Agbaje to use his wealth for societal benefit, in recognition of his position among the hierarchy of leaders of Ibadan. A culture of largesse among prominent Ibadan chiefs had become part of the Ibadan society. Wealthy and high ranking chiefs were used to dashing money to Ibadan citizens and holding relatively open feasts for merrymaking and enjoyment. However, Agbaje who made money in a colonial economic system was less interested in the largesse tradition of Ibadan and tried his best to avoid it. This earned him the irritation of Ibadan masses. In 1949, Mogajis (or clan heads) in Ibadan brought charges against Agbaje to forestall him from becoming the Oba of Ibadan, a position which had little to do with blood lineage but rather relied on a person's position within the company of warrior and civil chiefs. An underlying reason was his contempt for the largesse tradition and his unpopularity with Ibadan masses. However, a commission assembled to look over the case, cleared Agbaje of all charges.

At the time of his death, he had ten wives and numerous children. He was known to have spent a great deal in giving his children the best education money can buy.
