= Akinpelu Obisesan =

Nigerian diarist (1889–1963)

- Born: 1889; Ibadan, Nigeria
- Died: 1963 (aged 73–74)
- Occupations: Businessman, farmer, Diarist
- Writing career
- Genre: Diary
- Subject: Personal

Akinpelu Obisesan (1889–1963) was a Nigerian diarist, businessman and politician. He was among a class of educated elites in the early twentieth century who kept private records of their activities and who were also speakers at formal events. Many of them later published their presentations in newspapers, as this was sometimes seen as a passage into intellectual status in the western Nigerian milieu. Akinpelu's records from 1920 to 1960 became an important source for elite activities during the colonial era and are used by a few scholars on predefined topics varying from the cultural, political and social history of Ibadan and western Nigeria.

Included in his diaries were stories about Salami Agbaje, one of the wealthiest Ibadan citizens of his time, and socio-political matters of the era. Agbaje was the first individual to own a two-story house built from cement and the first to own a car in Ibadan. In late 1949, Agbaje was charged for selfishness by community leaders, who challenged his hoarding of wealth. Akinpelu and other elites also engaged in discussions and wrote about major events of the era, topics on the Lagos elites and defence of his family's land interests were major issues written and discussed about.

== Early life ==
Obisesan was born in Ibadan to the family of an elephant hunter: Aperin Obisesan and a slave woman. His father was one of the early defenders of Ibadan against the Ijebu incursions of the late nineteenth century. He was rewarded with a chieftaincy title for his effort in defending Ibadan. He also acquired a vast forest during the period.

Obisesan attended various schools managed by the Church Missionary Society. The missionary school teachers were educated and frequently wrote about their activities in journals. One of the missionaries was Daniel Olubi, an early Christian convert who was Obisesan's teacher in 1896, the first year of his formal education. Olubi was a mentor to Obisesan and guided him in his studies. Obisesan's impetus to keep a journal could have been established while attending the missionary schools. After completing his studies, he started work at the office of the British resident in Ibadan, but later moved to Lagos to work with the railway authority. In 1913, he returned to Ibadan and a year later, he was appointed as the caretaker and secretary of his family's land holdings. His father had used his vast forest to farm and transformed it into a productive Cocoa growing field. However, the ownership of the land was disputed, as other citizens laid claims to the land. In 1914, he bought in first diary, speculatively, he may have used his diary as a means to record events on the family's farm business or for record keeping.

== Career ==
Before and after becoming the secretary of his family's farm interests, Obisesan Akinpelu was a mercantile clerk and produce buyer. While in Ibadan, he supplemented his income by working for the Paterson Zochonis group. He later became a produce buyer of Cocoa. For a span of 30 years, he was president of the Ibadan Cooperative Produce Marketing Society. As leader of the cooperative produce society, he was an important voice against foul tactics used by merchant middlemen and Cocoa exporters. He also became the pioneer chairman of the Cooperative Bank of Ibadan. A bank created to serve the needs of cooperative societies in the region.

== Record keeping ==
Obisesan was educated in an environment where literary skills was seen as a sign of intellectual fineness and with most missionaries situated in Lagos and Abeokuta, the school age residents of the two cities had a fast start in literacy and honing their writing skills. He also believed literacy could be a ticket to acquire wealth and without education, Ibadan may be left behind. He desired writing as a way to educate himself and record keeping was a productive way of keeping himself abreast of developments in his business. In his diaries, fingerprints of his emulation of status men and being enthralled with wealth at an early age could be seen. At an early age, he dreamt about having a fecund future, however, the reality of his poor financial position was always something he moaned and wrote about early on. During his early years when he was suffering from financial deprivation, Akinpelu wrote in his diary,

I regard my past and present life as being indolent and lazy one. Nobody in this town will regard anyone of no means; he will be counted as no man.... after all what his our intelligence, our school going, and reading of books without getting money to back these three things up.

In 1920, when he started writing assiduously, it was a means of self-education and self-development. Contents in his diary revealed different information about the social personalities and events of the era, it also revealed personal details of his life. Though, he had written in 1930 that he was fatigued as a result of numerous intercourse with his wives., in 1955, he married his final wife.
