= List of Obas of Lagos =

The list of Obas of Lagos denotes the traditional rulers of Lagos in Nigeria.

== List ==
=== House of Ashipa - (Ashipa dynasty) ===
Name	Lifespan	Reign start	Reign end	Notes	Family	Image
Ashipa	1621-1636(?)	-----	-----	A local Awori chieftain from Isheri. Founder of Lagos dynasty of Kings, but not crowned as an Oba of Lagos	House of Olofin	
Ado		1636	1669	1st Oba. The son of Ashipa	House of Ashipa	
Gabaro		1669	1704	2nd Oba. The son of Ado.	House of Ashipa	
Eletu Kekere: Eletu Omo		1704	1704	3rd Oba. The only son of Gabaro, nephew to Akinsemoyin. His reign was so brief that it is barely acknowledged by most historians and is sometimes omitted all together. Sources of him being actually crowned an Oba in Lagos are scanty. Not much is known of his reign other than him dying intestate (without an heir).	House of Ashipa	
Akinsemoyin		1704	1749	4th Oba. Another son of Ado, a brother to Gabaro and uncle to Eletu Kekere. Longest reigning Oba in Lagos to date (45 years). He created the Eletu Omo chieftaincy in the Akarigbere class in commemoration of his predecessor. His time marked the end of the Ashipa dynasty through the paternal line of descent.	House of Ashipa	

=== House of Alagbigba (Alaagba) - Ologunkutere dynasty ===
Name	Lifespan	Reign start	Reign end	Notes	Family	Image
Ologun Kutere: Ologun Kuture	d. 1775	1749	1775	5th Oba. Son of the union between Erelu Kuti daughter of Ado and Alaagba, an Ijesha resident chieftain and priest of Obalufon in Lagos who also served as Babalawo to Oloye (chief) Aromire, and later Akinsemoyin. The Lagos royal dynasty shifts to a line of descent through the matrilineal pedigree of Erelu Kuti, and Omo Obalufon becomes a cognomen for all Lagos Obas and their descendants.	Alaagba dynasty	
Adele Ajosun	d. 1837	1775	1780	6th Oba. Second son of Ologun Kutere. First reign. He would return again and reign for a second time as the 10th Oba for two years. Throughout his first reign, he was constantly threatened by his brother Eshinlokun for the title of Oba which he felt should have been his. He fell out with the chiefs and was deposed in 1780. He then left for Badagry with his mother and the skull of his father, Ologun Kutere.	Alaagba dynasty	
Oṣinlokun: Eshinlokun	d.1819	1780	1819	7th Oba. Son of Ologun Kutere and elder brother to Adele Ajosun.	Alaagba dynasty	
Idewu Ojulari: Idowu Ojulari	d. 1832	1819	1832	8th Oba. Son of Oshinlokun.	Alaagba dynasty	
Adele Ajosun	d. 1834	1832	1834	9th Oba. Return of Adele Ajosun who reigned first as the 6th Oba.	Alaagba dynasty	
Oluwole	d. 1841	1834	1841	10th Oba. The son of Adele.	Alaagba dynasty	
Akitoye	d. 1853	1841	1845	11th Oba, Son of Ologun kKutere. First reign. He would return again and reign for a second time as the 13th Oba.	Alaagba dynasty	
Kosoko	d.1872	1845	1851	12th Oba, a son of Osinlokun and brother to Idewu Ojulari.	Alaagba dynasty	
Akitoye: Akintoye		1851	1853	13th Oba. Second reign. Return of Akintoye who would reign for a further two years.	Alaagba dynasty	
Dosunmu: Docemo	1823-1885; 62 Years	1853	1885	14th Oba, Son of Akintoye.	Alaagba dynasty	
Oyekan I	1854-1900; 46 Years	1885	1900	15th Oba, a son of Dosunmu.	Alaagba dynasty	
Eshugbayi Eleko: Eleko	1860-1932 72 Years	1901	1925	16th Oba, a son of Dosunmu. First reign. He would return to reign as the 19th Oba. He supported the educated elite of Lagos led by Prince Oluwa and Herbert Macaulay in their struggle against British colonialism. He was exiled to Oyo in 1925.	Alaagba dynasty	
Ibikunle Akitoye	d.1928	1925	1928	17th Oba, a grandson of Oba Akintoye. First christian Oba.	Alaagba dynasty	
Sanusi Olusi		1928	1931	18th Oba, a grandson of Oba Akintoye.	Alaagba dynasty	
Eshugbayi Eleko	1860-1932 72 Years	1931	1932	19th Oba. Return of Eshugbayi Eleko who would go on to reign for one year .	Alaagba dynasty	
Falolu Dosunmu	d.1949	1932	1949	20th Oba	Alaagba dynasty	
Adeniji Adele	1893 - 1964; 70 Years	1949	1964	21st Oba. Grandson of Adele Ajosun	Alaagba dynasty	
Oyekan II	1911 - 2003; 91 Years	1965	2003	22nd Oba. Grandson of Oyekan I.	Alaagba dynasty	
Rilwan Akiolu	1943; Age 80	2003	Incumbent	23rd Oba.	Alaagba dynasty	
