= Timeline of Lagos =

Coordinates: 6°27′11″N 3°23′45″E

The following is a timeline of the history of the metropolis of Lagos, Nigeria.

== Prior to 19th century ==
- 1472 - Ruy de Sequeira of Portugal names area "Lago de Curamo."
- 1600 - Ashipa becomes Oba.
- 1630
  - King Ado in power.
  - Iga Idunganran built (approximate date).
- 1669 - King Gabaro in power.
- 1704 - King Akinsemoyin in power.
- 1749
  - Eletu Kekere becomes Oba.
  - King Ologun Kutere in power.
- 1775 - Adele Ajosun becomes Oba.
- 1780 - Eshilokun becomes Oba.

== 19th century ==
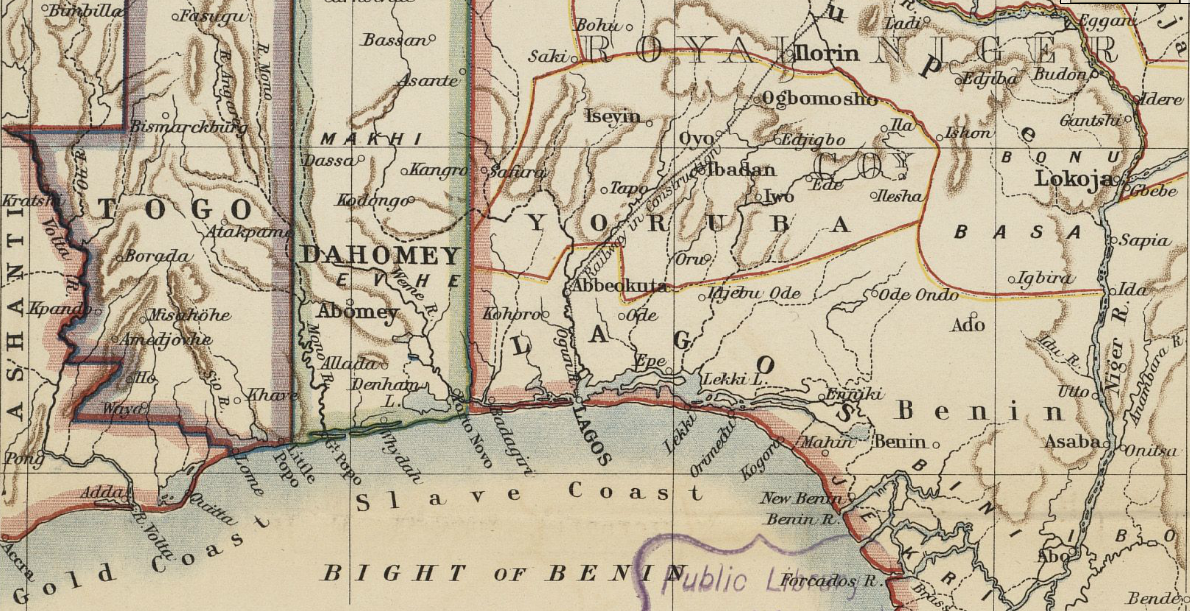
Detail of 1898 map showing Lagos, Nigeria

- 1829 - Oba Idewu Ojulari in power.
- 1837 - Oba Oluwole in power.
- 1841 - Akitoye becomes Oba.
- 1845 - Oba Kosoko in power.
- 1851 - British bombardment of Lagos.
- 1851 - 1853 Akitoye reigns as Oba for the second time.
- 1852 - Oba Akitoye signed the Treaty between Britain and Lagos for the abolition of slavery.
- 1852 - British consulate established.
- 1853 - King Dosunmu in power.
- 1859- The CMS Grammar School in Bariga, a suburb of Lagos in Lagos State, is the oldest secondary school in Nigeria, founded on 6 June 1859 by the Church Missionary Society
- 1860 - Catholic church established.
- 1861 - Lagos annexed by the British.
- 1862 - Lagos becomes a British colony.
- 1866 - Population: 25,083.
- 1878 - Methodist Boys' High School, Lagos founded.
- 1881 - Population: 37,452.
- 1885 - Oba Oyekan I in power.
- 1886 - Telephone cables connect Lagos to London.
- 1888 - Lagos Chamber of Commerce established.
- 1889 - Court House built.
- 1894
  - Lagos Echo and Lagos Standard newspapers begin publication.
  - Bank of British West Africa established.
- 1898 - Electric street lighting commences operation.
- 1899
  - Anglo-African Bank established.
  - Briton William MacGregor becomes governor of Lagos Colony.
- 1900 - Ibadan-Lagos railway begins operating.

== 20th century ==
=== 1901–1959 ===
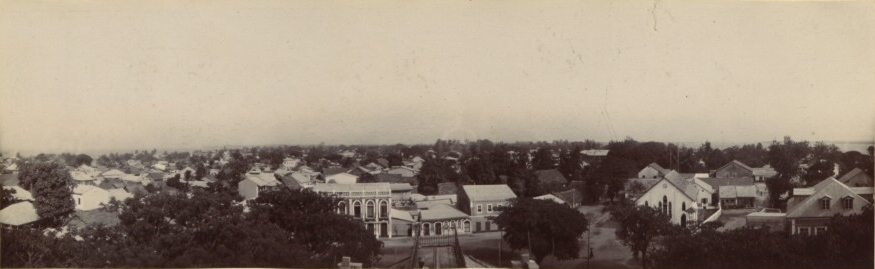
Colonial era Lagos, ca.1910

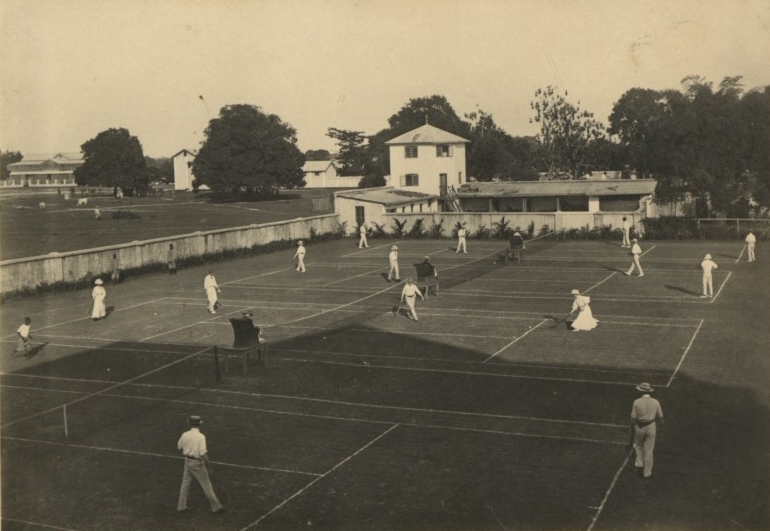
Colonialists on the tennis courts Government House in Lagos., ca.1910

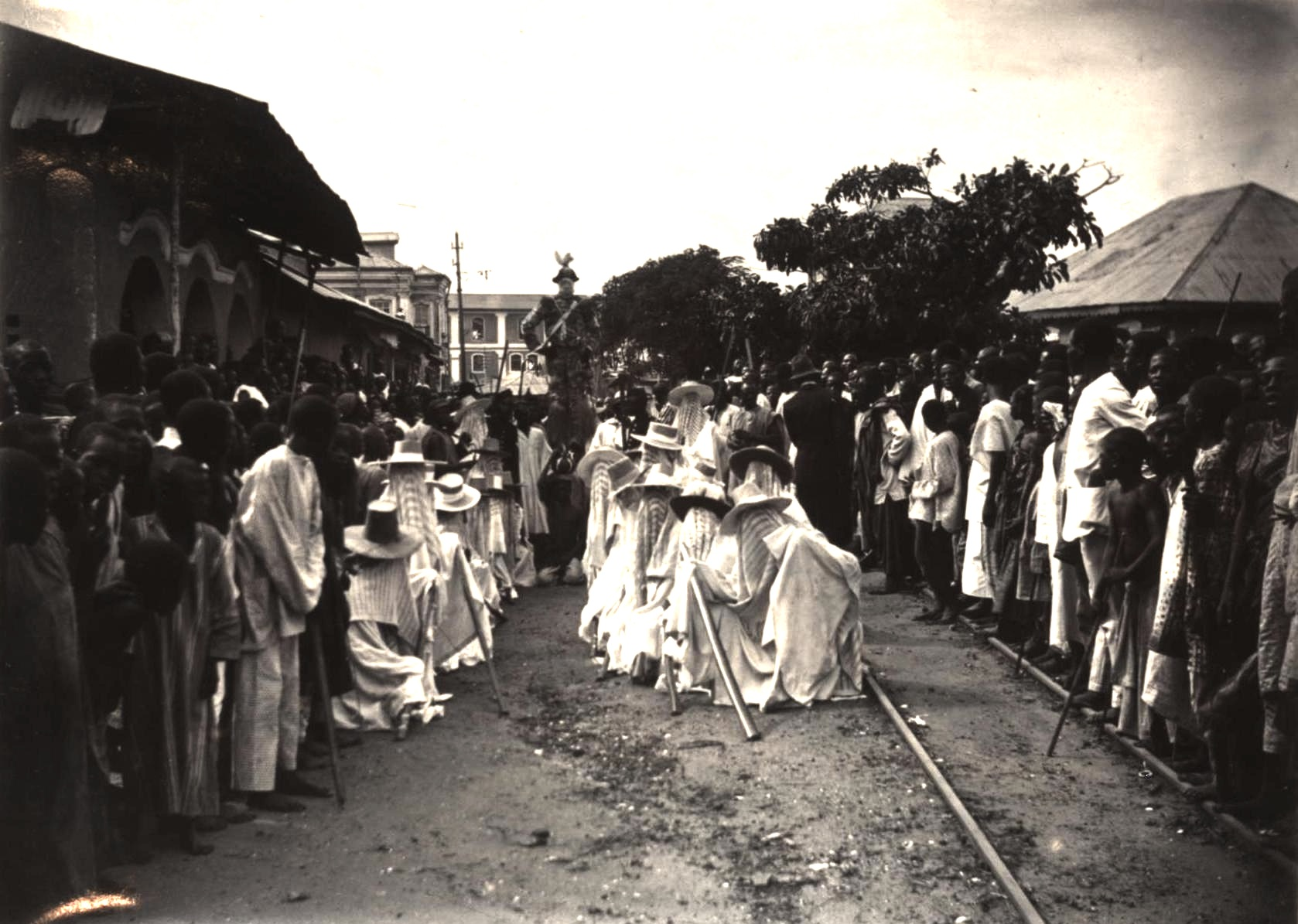
Lagos, 1912

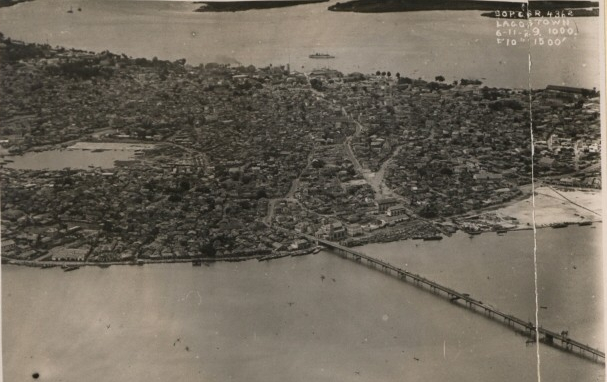
Aerial photograph of Lagos in 1929

- 1901
  - Oba Eshugbayi Eleko in power.
  - Carter Bridge built.
  - Lagos Institute founded.
  - Population: 41,487.
- 1903 - Artist Aina Onabolu active.
- 1905 - first Orange Lodge in Nigeria, named "Lagos Fine Blues Loyal Orange Lodge No 801".
- 1908 - Lagos Municipal Board of Health and People's Union established.
- 1909 - King's College, Lagos founded.
- 1911
  - Kano-Lagos railway begins operating.
  - Anti-Slavery and Aborigines Protection Society chapter established.
  - Population: 73,766.
- 1913 - Apapa wharf built.
- 1914
  - Lagos becomes capital of the British Colony and Protectorate of Nigeria.
  - Lagos Central Times newspaper begins publication (approximate date).
  - Anfani Bus Service begins operating.
- 1917 - Lagos Town Council and Colonial Bank established.
- 1920s - Lagos Market Women's Association founded.
- 1921 - Population: 98,303.
- 1923
  - Ansar Ud Deen (religious group) and Lagos Women's League established.
  - Nigerian National Democratic Party founded in Lagos.
- 1925
  - Oba Ibikunle Akitoye in power.
  - Lagos Daily News newspaper begins publication.
- 1926
  - Nigerian Daily Times newspaper begins publication.
  - Industrial Army Home (reformatory) built in Yaba.
- 1927 - Queen's College, Lagos and Lagos Executive Development Board established.
- 1928
  - Oba Sanusi Olusi in power.
  - St Gregory's College, Lagos and Lagos Book Club founded.
- 1930 - Stadium built.
- 1931
  - Tom Jones Library opens.
  - Population: 126,474.
- 1932
  - Oba Falolu in power.
  - Igbobi College and Yaba Higher College founded.
- 1933 - The first indigenous Nigerian bank, the National Bank of Nigeria, was established.
- 1939 - Yaba Estate built.
- 1943 - Art Exhibition Centre and Lagos Museum open.
- 1944 - Nigerian Women's Party organized in Lagos.
- 1945 - Holy Child College Obalende established.
- 1946
  - Anglican Cathedral built.
  - Nigerian Breweries incorporated.
- 1947 - Yaba College of Technology founded.
- 1949
  - "Rent control committee" organized.
  - Oba Adeniji Adele in power.
- 1950
  - Mayoral council established; Abubakar Ibiyinka Olorun-Nimbe elected mayor.
  - Roman Catholic Archdiocese of Lagos active.
- 1951 - Lagos becomes part of the Western Region.
- 1952 - Population: 267,407.
- 1957
  - Nigerian National Museum founded.
  - Irohin Imole Yoruba-language newspaper begins publication.
- 1958 - Stationery Stores Football Club founded.

=== 1960–1999 ===
- 1960 - Lagos Stock Exchange and Nigeria Acceptances Limited.
- 1961 - Nigerian Institute of International Affairs founded.
- 1962 - University of Lagos established.
- 1963
  - Independence House built.
  - Population: 655,246.
- 1964
  - National Library of Nigeria built.
  - Bagatelle restaurant in business (approximate date).
  - Lebanese Community School established.
- 1965 - Adeyinka Oyekan II becomes Oba.
- 1967
  - Lagos State created.
  - Mobolaji Johnson becomes governor of Lagos State.
- 1972 - Lagos National Stadium built.
- 1973 - 2nd All-Africa Games held.
- 1975
  - Eko Bridge built.
  - Federal Government College Lagos and Bridge Boys Football Club founded.
  - Adekunle Lawal becomes governor of Lagos State.
  - Population: 1,060,848 city; 1,476,837 urban agglomeration.
- 1976 - National Arts Theatre built.
- 1977
  - Second World African Festival of Arts and Culture held in Festac Town.
  - Fela Kuti's Kalakuta Republic compound in Mushin burns down.
  - Nigerian Institute of Medical Research established in Yaba (approximate date).
  - Ndubuisi Kanu becomes governor of Lagos State.
- 1978 - Ebitu Ukiwe becomes governor of Lagos State.
- 1979
  - Murtala Muhammed International Airport opens.
  - Lateef Jakande becomes governor of Lagos State.
- 1980
  - Badagry-Lagos highway constructed.
  - Lagos Plan of Action drafted.
  - Apata Memorial High School founded.
  - Wonder Baking Company in business.
- 1981
  - International School Lagos established.
  - Winners' Chapel megachurch begins.
- 1982 - Indian Language School established.
- 1983
  - Vanguard newspaper begins publication.
  - Mama Cass restaurant in business.
- 1984 - Gbolahan Mudasiru becomes governor of Lagos State.
- 1985 - Newswatch magazine begins publication.
- 1986 - Mike Akhigbe becomes governor of Lagos State.
- 1988 - Raji Rasaki becomes governor of Lagos State.
- 1989
  - African Championships in Athletics held.
  - Intercontinental Bank founded.
- 1990
  - Third Mainland Bridge opens.
  - Lagos City Polytechnic and Equitorial Trust Bank established.
  - Population: 4,764,000 (urban agglomeration).
- 1991
  - Federal government relocates from Lagos to Abuja.
  - Tell Magazine begins publication.
  - Diamond Bank opens.
  - Lagos Business School established.
  - Jhalobia Group moves its headquarters to Lagos.
- 1992
  - Pepsi Football Academy founded, Agege.
  - Nigerian Air Force C-130 crash.
  - Michael Otedola becomes governor of Lagos State.
- 1993
  - Jhalobia Botanical Gardens opens.
  - Olagunsoye Oyinlola becomes governor of Lagos State.
- 1994
  - Chocolat Royal in business.
  - P.M. News newspaper begins publication.
- 1995
  - Thisday newspaper begins publication.
  - Population: 5,966,000 (urban agglomeration).
- 1996
  - Babington Macaulay Junior Seminary established.
  - Tastee Fried Chicken opens in Surulere.
  - Mohammed Buba Marwa becomes governor of Lagos State.
- 1997
  - Redeemer's International Secondary School founded in Maryland.
  - Tantalizers restaurant opens in Festac Town (approximate date).
- 1999
  - 20 February: Nigerian parliamentary election, 1999 held.
  - Bola Tinubu becomes governor of Lagos State.
- 2000 - **Population: 7,233,000 (urban agglomeration).

== 21st century ==
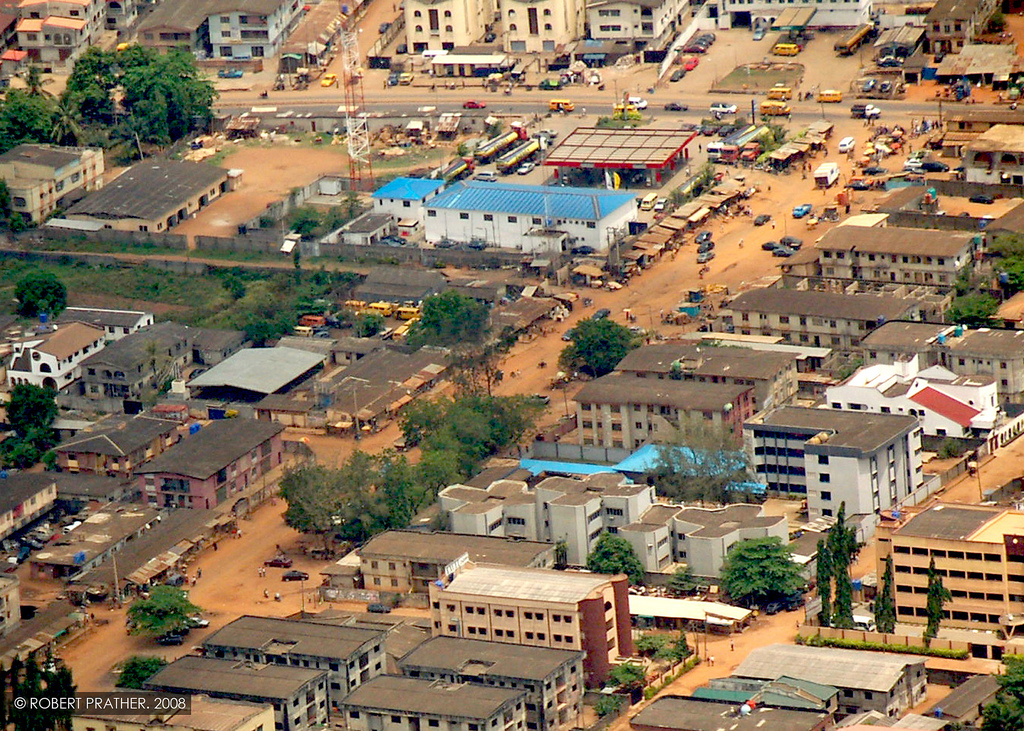
Lagos, 2008

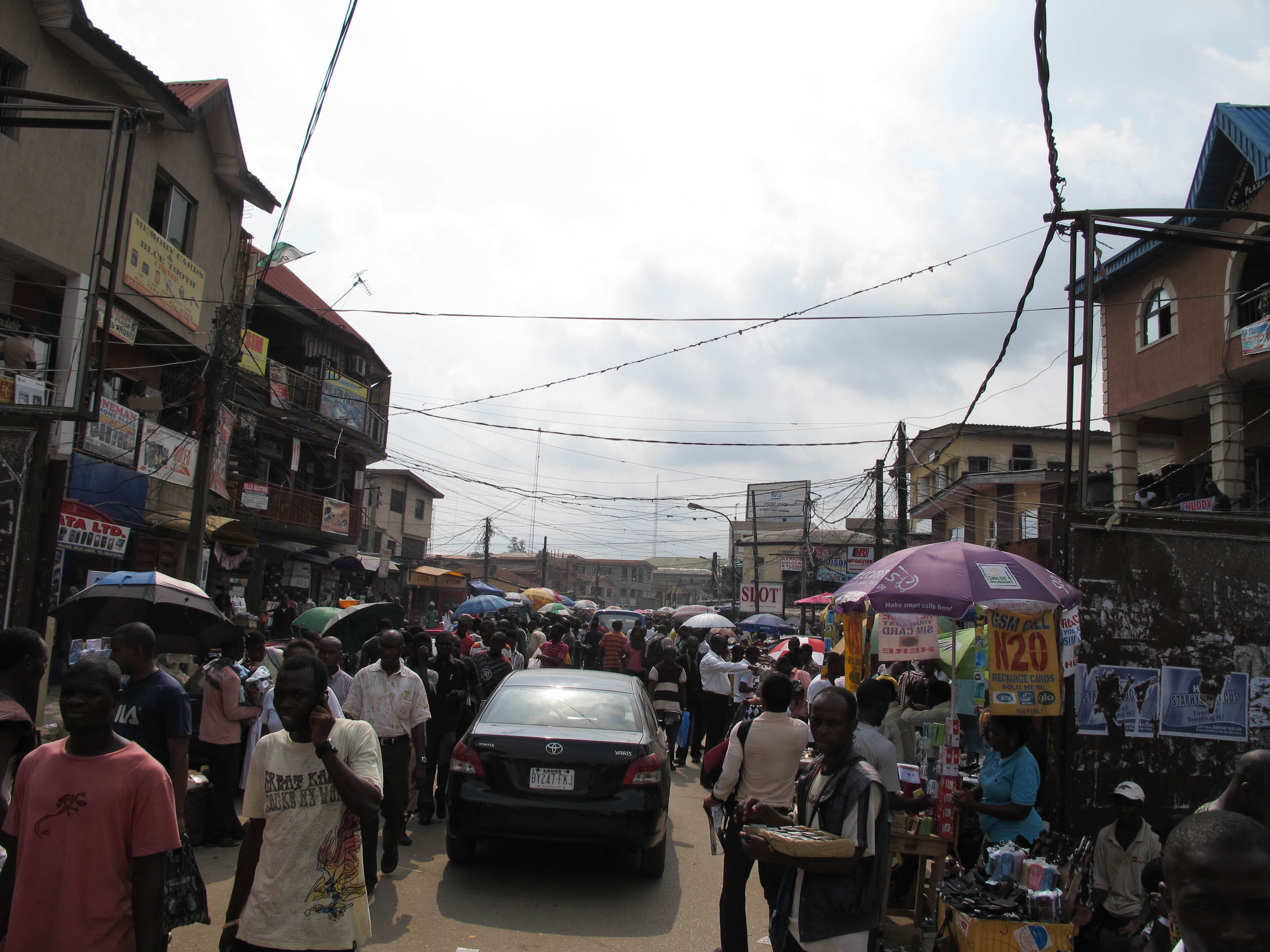
Lagos, 2010

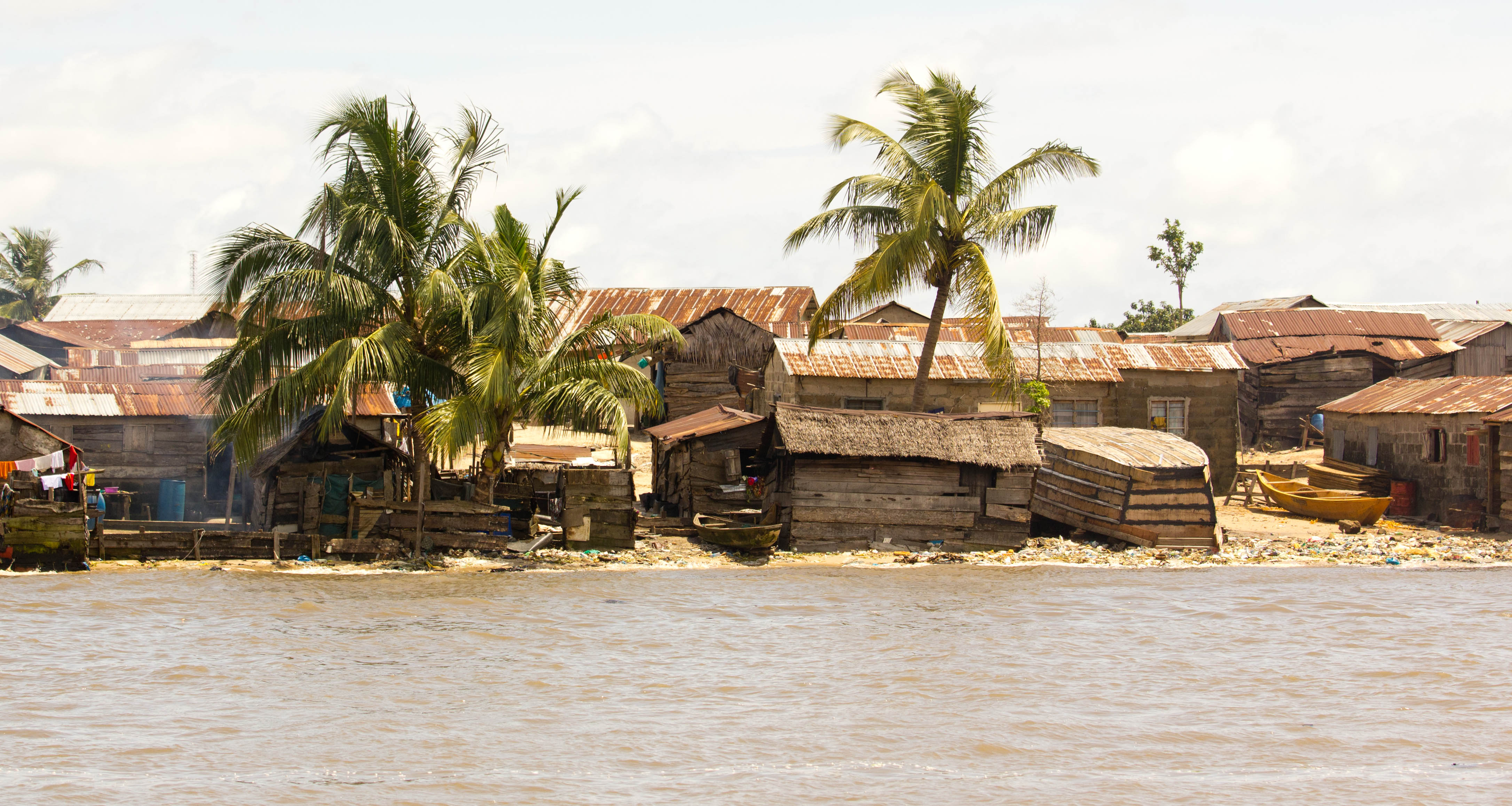
Lagos, 2011

- 2001 - The Daily Independent newspaper begins publication.
- 2002
  - City divided "into 57 local council areas."
  - Pan-African University, Lagos established.
  - Lagos armoury explosion.
- 2003
  - Oba Rilwan Akiolu in power.
  - The Sun newspaper begins publication.
- 2004
  - Spring Bank founded.
  - Silverbird Cinema in business.
- 2005
  - Business Day newspaper begins publication.
  - SunRise Sixth Form College established.
  - Population: 8,767,000 (urban agglomeration).
  - 16 November: Fire at Ebute Metta.
- 2006
  - 2006 Lagos building collapses
  - The Nation newspaper begins publication.
  - Tin Can Island Port Complex formed.
  - FinBank founded.
  - Palms Shopping Mall opens.
  - May - Atlas Creek pipeline explosion.
  - December - Abule Egba pipeline explosion.
  - Moments with Mo talk show begins broadcasting.
- 2007
  - April: State election held; Babatunde Fashola becomes governor of Lagos State.
  - Teslim Balogun Stadium built.
  - Centre for Contemporary Art founded.
- 2008
  - Next newspaper begins publication.
  - My People Football Club founded.
  - Ijegun pipeline explosion.
- 2009 - Nike Centre for Art and Culture opens.
- 2010
  - Lagos Photo festival begins.
  - Whitespace cultural venue active.
- 2011
  - Lagos Fashion Week begins.
  - Enterprise Bank Limited, Keystone Bank Limited, and Mainstreet Bank Limited formed.
  - Ikeja City Mall, L'Espace (shop), and Google office in business.
- 2012
  - Makoko slum razed.
  - Lagos Countdown begins.
- 2013
  - Lekki-Ikoyi Link Bridge opens.
  - Makoko Floating School built.
  - Eko Atlantic development construction begins.
- 2014
  - Ebola virus outbreak.
  - 12 September: Synagogue Church building collapse occurs in nearby Ikotun-Egbe.
- 2015 – 12 August: Helicopter crash in Oworonshoki.
- 2016 - Building collapse.
- 2018 - African Championships in Athletics.
- 2019 - School collapse.
- 2020 - End SARS protests.
- 2021 - High-rise collapse
- 2022 - End SARS protests 2nd anniversary botched protests
- 2023 - 2023 National and State elections

== See also ==
- History of Lagos
- List of governors of Lagos State
- List of Lagos State local government areas by population
- Timelines of other cities in Nigeria: Ibadan, Kano, Port Harcourt

== Bibliography ==
=== Published in 19th-20th centuries ===
- Thomas Spencer Baynes, ed. (1890), "Lagos", Encyclopædia Britannica (9th ed.), NY: Allen
- Nigeria. Chief Secretary's Office (1919), The Nigeria handbook containing statistical and general information respecting the colony and protectorate, Lagos: Government Printer, OCLC 44555135, OL 24625841M
- Evelyn Irons (1961), "Lagos", Nigeria, Garden City, N.Y: N. Doubleday, OL 5817574M (children's book)
- Historical events: Lagos and environs, 1862-1962. Lagos: Federal Census Office. 1962. OCLC 48631290.
- Peter Marris (1962). Family and social change in an African city: a study of rehousing in Lagos. Reports of the Institute of Community Studies; 5. US: Northwestern University Press. ISBN 9780810101562 – via HathiTrust.
- Richard L. Sklar (1963). "Origins of the Two-Party System in Lagos". Nigerian Political Parties: Power in an Emergent African Nation. Africa World Press. p. 41+. ISBN 978-1-59221-209-5.
- Reuben K. Udo (1970). "Lagos Metropolitan District". Geographical Regions of Nigeria. University of California Press.
- Robert Sydney Smith (1979). The Lagos Consulate, 1851-1861. University of California Press. ISBN 978-0-520-03746-5.
- Tom G. Forrest (1994). "Lagos Enterprises". The Advance of African Capital: The Growth of Nigerian Private Enterprise. University of Virginia Press. pp. 86–130. ISBN 978-0-8139-1562-3.
- "Nigeria: Lagos", West Africa (4th ed.), Lonely Planet, 1999, pp. 710+, OL 8314753M
- Ayodeji Olukoju (2000). "Cost of Living in Lagos 1914–45". In David Anderson; et al. (eds.). Africa's Urban Past. Oxford: James Currey Publishers. ISBN 978-0-85255-761-7.
- Rem Koolhaas; et al. (2000). "Lagos". Mutations. Barcelona: ACTAR. ISBN 9788495273536.

=== Published in 21st century ===
==== 2000s ====
- Okwui Enwezor, ed. (2002). Under Siege: Four African Cities, Freetown, Johannesburg, Kinshasa, Lagos. Ostfildern, Germany: Hatje Cantz. ISBN 978-3-7757-9090-1. "Documenta11" + website
- Paul Tiyambe Zeleza; Dickson Eyoh, eds. (2003). "Lagos, Nigeria". Encyclopedia of Twentieth-Century African History. Routledge. ISBN 0415234794.
- Hakeem Tijani (2004). "'New' Lagos Town Council and Urban Administration, 1950–1953". In Toyin Falola; et al. (eds.). Nigerian Cities. Africa World Press. pp. 255+. ISBN 978-1-59221-169-2.
- Ayodeji Olukoju (2004). The 'Liverpool' of West Africa: The Dynamics and Impact of Maritime Trade in Lagos, 1900-1950. Africa World Press. ISBN 978-1-59221-292-7.
- Ayodeji Olukoju (2005). "Lagos: Die Geburt einer Stadt". In Jürg Schneider; et al. (eds.). Die Reisen Von Carl Passavant 1883–1885 (in German). Museum der Kulturen Basel.
- Kevin Shillington, ed. (2005). "Lagos". Encyclopedia of African History. Fitzroy Dearborn. ISBN 978-1-57958-245-6.
- Kristin Mann (2007). Slavery and the Birth of an African City: Lagos, 1760-1900. Indiana University Press. ISBN 978-0-253-11708-3.

==== 2010s ====
- O.E. Aluko (2010), "Impact of Urbanization on Housing Development: The Lagos Experience, Nigeria", Ethiopian Journal of Environmental Studies and Management, 3 (3)
- Michaela Alejandra Oberhofer (2012), "Fashioning African Cities: The Case of Johannesburg, Lagos and Douala", Streetnotes, 20 (20), doi:10.5070/S5201012052 – via California Digital Library
- Peter Probst (2012). "Lagos-Oshodi". In Kerstin Pinther; et al. (eds.). Afropolis: City Media Art. Jacana Media. p. 138+. ISBN 978-1-4314-0325-7.
- Highlights of Lagos history: 1839-2012. Lagos State Records and Archives Bureau. 2012. OCLC 841475312.
- Simon Heap (2012). "'Their Days are Spent in Gambling and Loafing, Pimping for Prostitutes, and Picking Pockets': Male Juvenile Delinquents on Lagos Island, 1920s-1960s". In Saheed Aderinto and Paul Osifodunrin (ed.). Third Wave of Historical Scholarship on Nigeria: Essays in Honor of Ayodeji Olukoju. UK: Cambridge Scholars Publishing. ISBN 978-1-4438-4712-4.
- Laurent Fourchard (2012). "Lagos and the Invention of Juvenile Delinquency in Nigeria". In Saheed Aderinto and Paul Osifodunrin (ed.). Third Wave of Historical Scholarship on Nigeria: Essays in Honor of Ayodeji Olukoju. UK: Cambridge Scholars Publishing. ISBN 978-1-4438-4712-4.
- Ayodeji Olukoju (2012). "Anatomy of Fire Outbreaks in Lagos, Nigeria, 1980–2008". In Greg Bankoff; et al. (eds.). Flammable Cities: Urban Conflagration and the Making of the Modern World. US: University of Wisconsin Press. pp. 353–371. ISBN 978-0-299-28383-4.
- Bonny Ibhawoh (2013). "Imperial Cosmopolitanism and the Making of an Indigenous Intelligentsia: African Lawyers in Colonial Urban Lagos". In Elizabeth Fay and Leonard von Morze (ed.). Urban Identity and the Atlantic World. Palgrave Macmillan. ISBN 978-1-137-20555-1.
- Kaye Whiteman (2013). Lagos: A Cultural History. Interlink Publishing. ISBN 978-1-62371-040-8.
- Ayodeji Olukoju (2014). "Port of Lagos, 1850–1929". In Miguel Bosa Suirez (ed.). Atlantic Ports and the First Globalisation C. 1850-1930. Palgrave Macmillan. pp. 112–129. ISBN 978-1-137-32798-7.
- Seth D. Kaplan (7 January 2014), "What Makes Lagos a Model City", New York Times
- "In Lagos, the 1% Takes Stock", New York Times, 25 April 2014
- L. Sawyer (2014). "Piecemeal urbanisation at the peripheries of Lagos". African Studies. 73 (2): 271–289. doi:10.1080/00020184.2014.925207. S2CID 143840819.
- Lakin Ogunbanwo (23 March 2015), "Insider's cultural guide to Lagos", The Guardian
- "Nigeria in pictures: Lagos facelift", BBC News, 11 May 2015, "Lagos has had a makeover over the last decade" (photos)
- Simon Heap (2015) (5 May 2015). "Processing Juvenile Delinquents at the Salvation Army's Boys' Industrial Home in Lagos, 1925–1944.". In Saheed Aderinto (ed.). Children and Childhood in Colonial Nigerian Histories. Basingstoke: Palgrave MacMillan. Springer. ISBN 978-1-137-49293-7.
