= 2025 Kerdasa building collapse =

February 2025 residential structure failure in Greater Cairo, Egypt

- Date: February 17, 2025
- Time: ~5:00 a.m. (EGY)
- Location: Kerdasa, Giza Governorate, Egypt
- Type: Structural failure
- Cause: Under investigation
- Deaths: 10
- Injuries: 8

On February 17, 2025, a three-story residential building collapsed in Kerdasa, a district in the western area of Greater Cairo, Egypt. The disaster resulted in ten fatalities and eight injuries.

== Collapse ==
The collapse occurred in the early morning hours, with local authorities receiving initial alerts at approximately 5 am local time. Local eyewitnesses reported that the collapse was caused by a gas cylinder explosion. The three-story residential structure collapsed completely onto Al-Mahwal Street, triggering an immediate emergency response from local authorities and rescue services.

The collapse killed 10 people and a further eight were injured.

== Response ==
Following the collapse, Governor of Giza Adel al-Naggar implemented emergency measures, including an immediate evacuation order for neighboring buildings as a precautionary safety measure. The Egyptian Ministry of Health and Population deployed rescue teams and ambulances to the site to conduct search and recovery operations to find victims trapped in the rubble, remove debris, and provide medical assistance to survivors.

Security forces and forensic teams were dispatched to the site to investigate the cause of the structural failure.

== See also ==
- George building collapse
- 2021 Lagos high-rise collapse
- 2016 Lagos building collapse
- 2006 Lagos building collapses
