= 2024 Saints Academy college collapse =

Structure collapse in Plateau State, Nigeria

- Date: 12 July 2024
- Time: ~8:30 AM (WAT)
- Location: Busa Buji, Jos North, Plateau State, Nigeria
- Casualties: 132 rescued
- Deaths: 22

On 12 July 2024 the Saints Academy college collapsed in the Busa Buji community in Jos North, Plateau State, Nigeria, killing at least 22 students and trapping about 120 more.

== Background ==
Structure collapses have become more common in Nigeria due to poor maintenance of structures, poorly enforced building regulations, the use of cheaper and low-quality materials, construction company negligence, and political corruption. As a result, over a dozen different structure collapses took place from 2022 to July 2024, in addition to the collapse of a high-rise building under construction in Lagos that killed at least 45 people, and the collapse of a three-story building in Lagos in 2022 that killed ten people.

== Collapse ==
At around 8:30 AM West Africa Time on 12 July 2024, the two-story concrete structure of the Saints Academy college located in the Busa Buji community collapsed while school was in session. At least 22 students were killed in the initial collapse, and about 154 students were trapped in the wreckage, many fifteen years old or less. According to students rescued from the collapse, some classes were taking exams when the collapse happened, and they reported seeing dozens of injured students.

== Aftermath ==
Emergency rescue workers, paramedics, and security forces were mobilized to the site of the collapse, and were able to evacuate 132 children trapped in the wreckage using heavy machinery. Dozens of locals came to the site mourning or offering to help rescuers. Locals claimed that it had rained for three days leading up to the collapse. 43 injuries were treated at Bingham University Teaching Hospital Jos, 32 were treated at the Our Lady of Apostles Hospital, 39 were treated at Plateau Specialists Hospital, and six more were treated at Jos University Teaching Hospital.

The Plateau State government gave orders for hospitals to take in patients and treat them regardless of payment or documentation. It blamed the collapse on the college's “weak structure and location near a riverbank”, and insisted that other schools with weak structures or foundations shut down.

== See also ==
- Synagogue Church building collapse
- Uyo church collapse
- 2019 Lagos school collapse
- 2021 Lagos high-rise collapse
