= Abiola Dosunmu =

- Erelu Kuti of Lagos
- Born: Abiola Dosunmu; 29 July 1947; Kano, Nigeria
- Spouse: Major Adekunle Elegbede (widowed); Chief Antonio Deinde Fernandez (divorced)
- Issue: Kunle Elegbede; Adewunmi Elegbede; Antoinette Oyinkansola Fernandez
- House: Dosunmu (by birth); Olumegbon (by marriage)
- Father: Omoba Adewunmi Dosunmu
- Mother: Olori Adejoke Dosunmu

Chief Abiola Dosunmu (formerly Dosunmu-Elegbede-Fernandez, born 29 July 1947), is a Nigerian businesswoman, socialite and traditional aristocrat. In addition to a variety of other chieftaincy titles, she currently holds that of the Erelu Kuti IV of Lagos.

== Early life ==
Abiola Dosunmu was born in Kano on 29 July 1947, into the royal family of Omoba Adewunmi and Olori Adejoke Dosunmu of Lagos Island. She is a direct descendant of Oba Dosunmu of Lagos, and is therefore of both royal Yoruba and royal Bini origins. Her maternal grandmother was an Iyalode of the Owu Egba.

== Marriage ==
In 1968, she married her first husband Major Abdulrazak Adekunle Elegbede from the family of Idi, Olo, Ijora, who was working with General Adeyinka Adebayo who was the military Governor of the region. Their marriage lasted for just years (1968-1972) and she became a widow at age 25 with two children. Dosunmu married Chief Antonio Dehinde Fernandez. Shortly after they married, she became the Erelu of Kuti.

== The Erelu Kuti IV of Lagos ==
Abiola Dosunmu was made the Erelu Kuti IV of Lagos by her relative (Oba Adeyinka Oyekan of Lagos) in 1980. In this capacity, she serves as the ceremonial queen mother, and reigns as regent of Lagos upon the death of an incumbent monarch, until a substantive successor is chosen by the college of kingmakers. She has since served as Erelu Kuti for most of her life, and holds a position that only princesses from the ruling houses can attain. Historically, only four women held the title of Erelu Kuti of Lagos of which Abiola Dosunmu is serving as Erelu kuti IV. Her lineage is rooted in the ruling royal houses of Lagos

=== Chiefly roles and responsibilities ===
==== In Lagos ====
The Erelu Kuti of Lagos' official duties include:

- Being a close confidant of the traditional rulers of Lagos.
- Being an adviser on all social matters, such as the conferment of traditional and honorary chieftaincy titles.
- Being the traditional leader of the Lagos women's organisations (such as the market guilds).
- Being a member of the kingmakers' council.

==== Elsewhere ====
- Being a member of the Ogboni in Egbaland
- Being the queen mother of Ile-Ife

== Competing claim to title ==
A woman with the same name as Dosunmu made claims to the Erelu Kuti's title, but she died in 2019.

== Business career ==
Dosunmu studied business administration in London. She was into the business of crude oil with her husband Fernadez. From oil, she divested into real estate. she also said to have "revolutionized the traditional Aso Oke business to become the multi-million dollar industry it is today", and she promoted the culture of the Yoruba people in Nigeria through the Aso Oke. She later served as the interior decorator of the Nigerian High Commission in London. She also opened a shop on Bond Street in London.

== Influence ==
The Erelu, a fashion trend consisting of a skirt and short agbada worn by women in the 80s and early 90s, is also credited to Abiola Dosunmu. Nigerian musician King Sunny Adé wrote a song honouring Dosunmu titled "Biibire Kose Fowora". and also wrote a song in 1988 titled the "Good shepherd"

== Honours and recognition ==
- National honour of the Royal Kingdom of Belgium.
- Life achievement award by Vanguard newspaper
- Honorary Doctorate Degree, D.Cul-Doctor of Culture at the 4th convocation ceremony of Igbinedion University, Okada.
- Pan African Exemplary Leadership 2016 Honour /Icon of True Silent Mega Philanthropist in Africa - In recognition and appreciation of her immense contribution to Nation building, massive job creation, consistent assistance to the less privileged, excellent mentorship towards youths, youth employment, public service delivery with integrity in her discharge of duty, Promotion and Preservation of African culture and values including her selfless service to God, Humanity, Nigeria and Africa.
- The Commonwealth Journalists Association Award.
- Nigerian Institute of International Affairs Award.
- West African Students Union Parliament Award for Exemplary Leadership.

== Personal life ==
Dosunmu married Major Adekunle Elegbede and had two children, Kunle Elegbede and Adewunmi Elegbede. The marriage ended when Major Elegbede died in the early 1970s. Dosunmu met Chief Antonio Deinde Fernandez, an Amaro member of the Olumegbon chieftaincy family of Lagos, in 1972. At the time, Fernandez was married to an American woman. Dosunmu and Fernandez were married in Nigeria at the Palace of the Oba of Lagos in April 1973 in a ceremony attended by famous Nigerians including Admiral Adekunle Lawal. They had one child, a daughter named Antoinette Fernandez, who is a London-based writer, filmmaker and Green Party (UK) activist. In 2007, Dosunmu was publicly ordered by Fernandez to stop using his surname.

== See also ==
- Alaba Lawson
