= Adeniji Adele =

Oba of Lagos (1893–1964)

Oba Sir Adeniji Adele II KBE
- Oba of Lagos
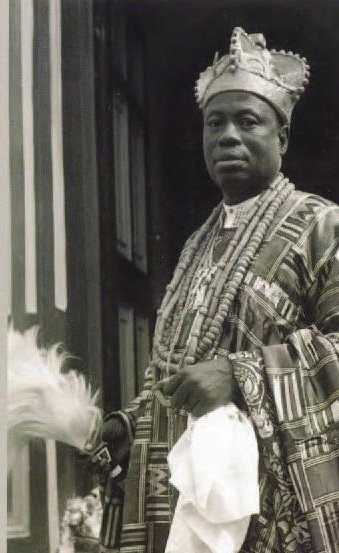
- Adeniji Adele II

Oba of Lagos
- Reign: 1949–1964
- Coronation: 1949
- Predecessor: Falolu Dosunmu
- Successor: Adeyinka Oyekan
- Born: Adeniji Adele; 13 November 1893 (N.S.: 13 November 1893); Lagos, Nigeria
- Died: 12 July 1964 (aged 70); Lagos, Nigeria
- Burial: Iga Idunganran
- House: Adele Ajosun, Ologun Kutere
- Father: Buraimoh Adele
- Mother: Moriamo Lalugbi
- Religion: Lahore Ahmadiyya Movement

Oba Sir Musendiku Buraimoh Adeniji Adele II, KBE (13 November 1893 – 12 July 1964) was the Oba (King) of Lagos from 1 October 1949 to 12 July 1964.

== Life ==
Adele was born in Lagos in 1893 to Buraimoh Adele and Moriamo Lalugbi. His grandfather was Oba Adele Ajosun. He studied at Holy Trinity Primary School, Ebutte-Ero and then at CMS Grammar School, Lagos. After his secondary education, he joined the colonial service as a trainee surveyor, after completing his training, he was posted to Kano as a surveyor. He served as a land surveyor with the Cameroon Expeditionary Force during World War I.

In 1920, Prince Adeniji Adele escorted Chief Amodu Tijani Oluwa to London to appear before the Judicial Committee of the Privy Council in the Oluwa Land Case, which the chief ultimately won. Adele later worked with the treasury department and became a chief clerk in 1937.

He was awarded the titles of Commander of the Order of the British Empire (1956) and Knight Commander of the Order of the British Empire (1962) by the Queen of the United Kingdom.

== Politics and legal challenge ==
Oba Adele II was a supporter of the Nigerian Youth Movement and a member of Egbe Omo Oduduwa led by Obafemi Awolowo. His political affiliation was therefore in opposition to the ruling NCNC/NNDP (whose political bedrock was the House of Docemo) founded by Herbert Macaulay and later led by Nnamdi Azikiwe. NNDP was opposed to Oba Adele's ascension, him not being descended from Dosunmu, and filed legal challenges to thwart his coronation. Oba Adele's right to the throne was finally sustained by the Judicial Committee of the Privy Council in England in 1957.
