= Dosunmu (surname) =

- Gender: Male
- Language: Yoruba

Origin
- Origin: NIgeria
- Meaning: Hold onto the sacred Òsùn staff
- Region of origin: South West, Nigeria/West Africa

Dòsùnmú is a Nigerian male given name and surname of Yoruba origin. It means "Hold onto the sacred Òsùn staff.". It holds deep meaning and is associated with the rich heritage and traditions of the Yoruba people. This is a common royal name in Lagos and other parts of West Africa. it has been written in the colonial times as Docemo and Dòsùmú, but also as Dossoumon in other parts of French West Africa. This is the most common (and most phonological) spelling.

== Notable Individuals with the Name ==
- Dosunmu (c. 1823–1885), Oba of Lagos.
- Abiola Dosunmu (born 1947), Nigerian chieftain, businesswoman and socialite.
- Adegboyega Dosunmu Amororo II (died 2021), Oba of the Owu Kingdom.
- Andrew Dosunmu, Nigerian photographer and filmmaker.
- Ayo Dosunmu (born 2000), American basketball player.
- Falolu Dosunmu (died 1949), Oba of Lagos.
- Tosin Dosunmu (born 1980), Nigerian footballer.
- Wahab Dosunmu (1939–2013), Nigerian politician.
