= Sanusi Olusi =

Oba of Lagos (1928 - 1931)

Oba Sanusi Olusi
- Oba of Lagos
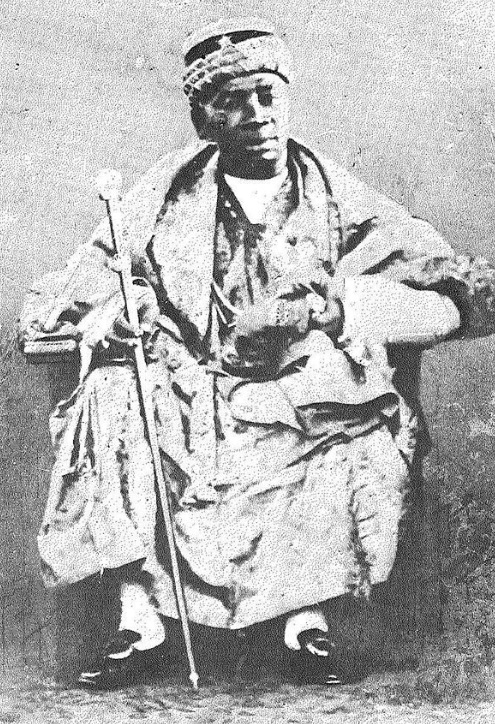
- Sanusi Olusi in 1928

Oba of Lagos
- Reign: 1928–1931
- Coronation: 1928
- Predecessor: Ibikunle Akitoye
- Successor: Eshugbayi Eleko
- Born: Sanusi Olusi; Lagos, Nigeria
- Died: 1945; Lagos
- Burial: Okesuna Cemetery
- Father: Fagbayi Ige
- Mother: Majiyagbe
- Religion: Islam

Oba Sanusi Olusi (died 1945) was a wealthy trader who succeeded Ibikunle Akitoye as Oba of Lagos from 1928 to 1931 during what some historians refer to as the "Interregnum" years of the exiled Oba Eshugbayi Eleko. Oba Sanusi Olusi was a grandson of Olusi, and great grandson of Oba Ologun Kutere. Sanusi Olusi was the first Muslim Oba of Lagos.

== Career and ascendancy to Oba of Lagos ==
Sanusi Olusi was a trader residing at 25 Bridge Street in Idumota. He previously contested the Obaship of Lagos in 1925 but lost to then Prince Ibikunle Akitoye. Shortly after his property at Bridge Street was acquired by the British colonial government in Nigeria, he was installed Oba of Lagos upon the death of Oba Ibikunle Akitoye. Sanusi Olusi's property was acquired by the government for the construction of Carter Bridge.

== Deposition as Oba of Lagos ==
Upon the return of the previously deposed and deported Oba Eshugbayi Eleko, Sanusi Olusi was persuaded to vacate the palace by the colonial government (Iga Idunganran) and was given a £1,000 house along Broad Street by the British colonial government plus an annual allowance of £400 annually. At a later time he was given his own place at Oke-Arin known as Iga Olusi.

== Re-contesting the Obaship of Lagos in 1932 ==
Upon Oba Eshugbayi Eleko's death in 1932, Sanusi Olusi contested the Obaship, this time going against Prince Falolu Dosunmu but lost the contest. There was some tension between Sanusi Olusi and Oba Falolu Dosunmu - In 1935, Oba Falolu protested what he perceived as Sanusi Olusi's overbearing behavior: using the royal insignia and acting and dressing as though he were the Oba. In response to Oba Falolu's protest Governor Cameron asked Sanusi Olusi to desist from such behavior.

== Death ==
Sanusi Olusi died in 1945 and was buried at Okesuna cemetery.
