= Omolara Oyekan-Olumegbon =

Nigerian politician

Member, Lagos State House of Assembly
- Incumbent
- Assumed office 2023
- Constituency: Lagos Island Constituency I

Personal details
- Born: January 1, 1988 (age 38) Lagos State, Nigeria
- Party: All Progressives Congress (APC)
- Spouse: Chief Fatai Olumegbon (deceased)
- Parent: Oba Adeyinka Oyekan II (father)
- Education: Bowen University; Lagos State University
- Occupation: Politician, Administrator
- Website: Lagos Assembly Profile

Princess Omolara Omotade Oyekan-Olumegbon (born c. 1988), also known as Lara Olumegbon, is a Nigerian politician and administrator who currently serves as a member of the Lagos State House of Assembly, representing Lagos Island Constituency I.

== Early life and education ==
Omolara Oyekan was born into the Lagos royal family. She is the daughter of the late Oba Adeyinka Oyekan II, the Oba of Lagos who reigned from 1965 to 2003. Her mother is a descendant of the Obanikoro of Lagos family.

She began her education at Crescent International School, Kano, for her primary education and proceeded to Supreme Education Foundation (SEF), Magodo, for her secondary education. She obtained a Bachelor of Science (B.Sc.) degree in Sociology from Bowen University. Later, she earned a Master's degree in International Relations and Strategic Studies from Lagos State University (LASU).

== Career ==
=== Public service ===
Before her election to the state legislature, Oyekan-Olumegbon served in the executive arm of local government. During the administration of Governor Babatunde Fashola, she was appointed as the Executive Secretary of Eti-Osa Local Government Area. In this role, she managed the administrative affairs of the council prior to the conduct of local elections.

She also worked in the private and federal sectors, holding positions such as Compliance Officer at International and General Insurance (IGI) and Special Assistant to the MD/CEO at the Bureau of Public Enterprises (BPE), Abuja.

=== Political career ===
In the 2023 general elections, she contested for the Lagos Island Constituency I seat in the Lagos State House of Assembly, eventually winning the election.

Upon her inauguration into the 10th Assembly, she was appointed as the Chairman of the House Committee on Women Affairs, Poverty Alleviation, and Job Creation. She has advocated for initiatives focused on urban farming to improve food security and programs aimed at empowering women with vocational skills.

== Personal life ==
She was married to the late High Chief Fatai Olumegbon, the Olumegbon of Lagos and Ajah, until his passing in 2019.
