= Ebute Ero Market =

Market in southwestern Nigeria

Ebute Ero Market is known to be the oldest, largest, and the first organized market on Lagos Island that gave birth to the other existing markets of today. The etymological name of the market was Ebute-Iwo-Ero due to the large population of people and traders that patronized the market, but was later shortened to Ebute Ero for pronunciation sake. It was established in 1719 during the reign of King Akinsemoyin of Lagos (1704-1749) before the arrival of colonial masters. The existence of the market was as a result of commercial contacts amongst the Lagosians and her neighbors. Traders from all parts of the Yorubaland purchased goods like textiles materials, fruits, domestic animals, foodstuffs, in exchange for craftworks, salts, and fish. The market itself started as a 7 days market then changed to 5 days market until it becomes a daily market under the colonial rule. It is a market located in Ebute Ero, a town in Lagos State, Nigeria. Ebute Ero Market is situated south of Makoko, close to Brown Square. In the market, the Badagry traders sells mats, baskets, coconuts in return for garri, cassava, yam and foodstuffs, from other traders which help to build inter group relations and promote unity amongst ethnic groups in Lagos because different ideas, languages, and cultures were exchanged. Oba Akinsemoyin being a slave merchant used part of the market for business transactions of slaves, gun and gun powder, palm oil, gold, palm kernel, tobacco, trinkets, Ijebu clothes, liquor, and all other items needed by the Portuguese. All these makes the Lagosians act as a middleman between the Europeans and the interior traders, but this doesn’t last long with the emancipation of slave trade in 1807 and the emergence of legitimate trade that turn the market articles to local products, foodstuffs, and imported goods, which attracted traders from all walks of life making Lagos Island to be an important trading center.

The market is one of the oldest and largest market in Nigeria.

In January 2013, a mysterious stone with Arabic inscription was found on the floor of the market.
