= Ologun =

Ologun is both a given name and a surname. Notable people with the name include:

- Andy Ologun (born 1983), Nigerian mixed-martial artist;
- Bobby Ologun (born 1973), Nigerian television personality and mixed-martial artist;
- Ologun Kutere, reigned as Oba of Lagos from the 1780s to around 1803.
