= Saratu =

Nigerian feminine given name

- Gender: Female
- Language: Hausa/Yoruba

Origin
- Origin: Nigerian
- Meaning: Grace or blessing.
- Region of origin: North and South, Nigeria

Saratu is a Nigerian feminine given name predominantly used among Muslims, particularly within the Hausa and the Yoruba communities. Derived from Arabic, "Maisaratun" (shortened to Saratu) signifies "grace" or "blessing." The name is the Hausa variant of Sara or Sarah used in various languages.

== Notable individuals with the name ==
- Saratu Gidado (1968–2024), Nigerian film actress
- Saratu Iya Aliyu (born 1948), Nigerian business director
- Saratu Atta, Ghanaian lawyer
