= Integrity testing =

Integrity testing may refer to:

- Employment integrity testing
- Foundation integrity testing
