= 2021 Lagos high-rise collapse =

2021 building collapse in Lagos, Nigeria

- Date: 1 November 2021
- Time: 2:45 pm WAT (UTC+01:00)
- Location: 44BCD Gerrard Road, Ikoyi, Lagos, Nigeria; 6°27′25″N 3°26′38″E
- Type: Building collapse
- Cause: Under investigation
- Deaths: 42

On 1 November 2021, a high-rise block of luxury flats under construction in the neighbourhood of Ikoyi in Lagos, Nigeria, collapsed. At least 42 people died. The government of Lagos State is conducting an investigation.

== Background ==
Fourscore Homes Limited, (Note: Named in some sources as "Fourscore Heights") based in the neighbourhood of Ikoyi in Lagos, Nigeria, financed and was undertaking (including having commissioned subcontractors for) the construction of a trio of highrise buildings at 44BCD (or 20) Gerrard Road in Ikoyi, known as the 360 Degrees Towers. The company was headed by the Nigerian developer Femi Osibona.

Osibona had previously worked as a shoe salesman, and had developed properties at Albion Drive, Hackney, London, in Atlanta, Georgia, and near Johannesburg, South Africa. He was an evangelist and a member of the Celestial Church of Christ. Osibona was educated at Mayflower School, Ikenne, and then took an HND in business and finance, reportedly at Croydon University (Note: Croydon College?) in the UK.

One of the buildings was a 21-storey luxury residential high-rise tower, and it was this building that collapsed. In February 2020, the consultancy firm Prowess Engineering Limited withdrew from the project over concerns regarding the integrity of the building. The Lagos State Building Control Agency had approved plans for 15 floors, but 21 had been constructed.

== Collapse ==
The collapse of one of the three 360 Degrees Towers occurred at 14:45 West Africa Time (UTC+1) on 1 November 2021. As of 6 November, 42 people have been confirmed dead. An early official estimate stated that up to 40 workers were on the construction site at the time. Osibona was also at the site, and died in the collapse. His body was recovered on 4 November. The Lagos state emergency agency stated that eight people were critically injured.

A rescue effort is being conducted by the National Emergency Management Agency (NEMA) in Lagos State, and other responders. The effort is supervised by the Commissioner for Special Duties and Intergovernmental Relations, and the Lagos State Ministry of Physical Planning and Urban Development. According NEMA, the military is scheduled to "take over operations".

As of 6 November, 15 people had been rescued. As of 3 November, Lagos State governor Babajide Sanwo-Olu said that the search was ongoing.

== Investigation ==
Gbolahan Oki, the general manager of the Lagos State Building Control Agency (LSBCA), announced on 2 November that the owner of the building has been arrested and would be prosecuted. In actuality, the owner, Femi Osibona, was one of those killed in the collapse.

The state government initially suspended Gbolahan Oki, the GM of LSBCA, and conducted an investigation through an independent panel, which was allotted 30 days to disclose findings. The Special Investigations Panel presented their report to the Council for the Regulation of Engineering in Nigeria (COREN) in February 2022.

== Lawsuit ==
Several months after the Lagos state government stated that it has seized and intended to demolish the two other towers, a group of interested parties sued the government. A 12 August 2022 lawsuit (No LD/3962LM/22), filed on behalf of 15 of the project's subscribers, sought to prevent government take over and demolition absent an independent engineering report showing that the structures were unsafe and could not reasonably be made safe. The suit also alleged that the state and its relevant agencies were "negligent in the performance of their duties by failing and/or neglecting to supervise the construction of one of the three towers," resulting in the collapse.

== See also ==
- 2006 Lagos building collapses
- Synagogue Church building collapse
- 2016 Lagos building collapse
- Uyo church collapse
- 2019 Lagos school collapse
