= Lagos State Ministry of Local Government and Chieftaincy Affairs =

Lagos State Ministry of Local Government and Community Affairs

Ministry overview
- Jurisdiction: Government of Lagos State
- Headquarters: State Government Secretariat, Alausa, Lagos State, Nigeria
- Ministry executive: Musiliu Folami, Commissioner
- Website: https://mlgca.lagosstate.gov.ng/

The Lagos State Ministry of Local Government and Chieftaincy Affairs is the state government ministry, charged with the responsibility to plan, devise and implement the state policies on Local Government and Chieftaincy Affairs.

== See also ==
- Lagos State Ministry of Special Duties
- Lagos State Executive Council
