= Saratu Iya Aliyu =

Nigerian businesswoman

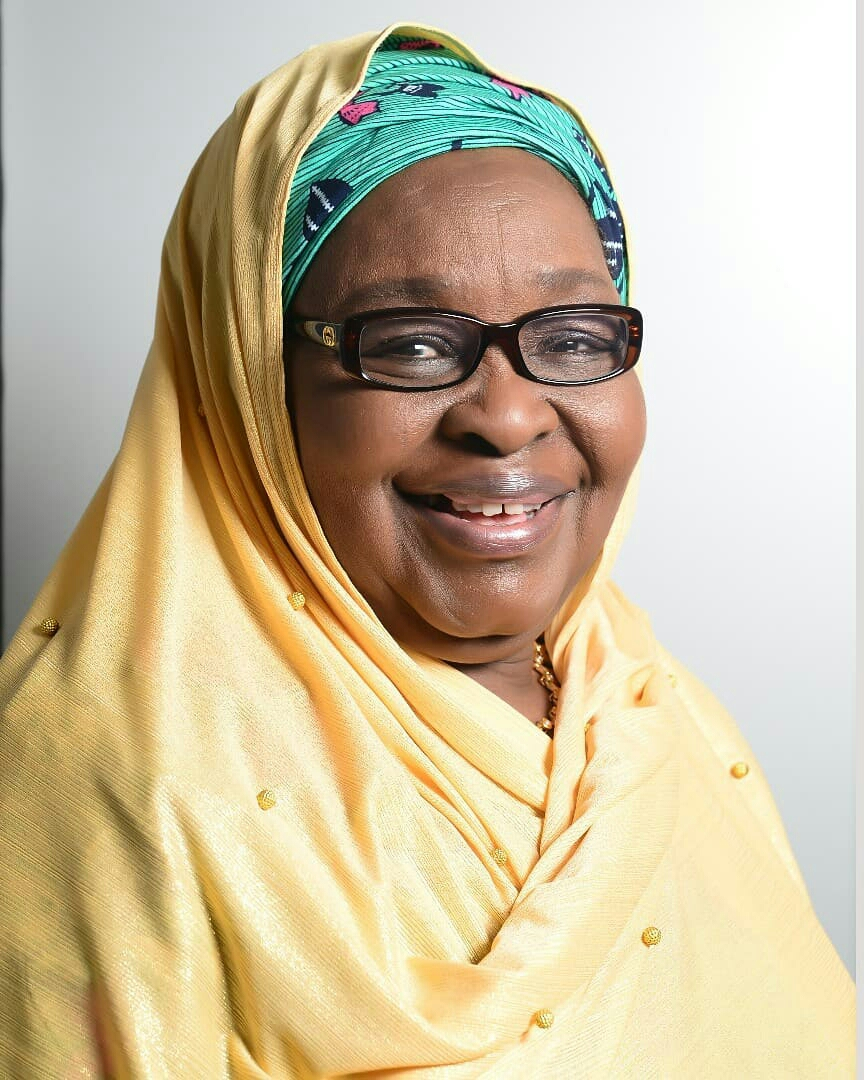
- Born: Nigeria
- Education: Ahmadu Bello University, Zaria
- Known for: 20th President of NACCIMA
- Title: Hajiya
- Predecessor: Alaba Lawson
- Spouse: Senator Nuhu Aliyu Labbo

Saratu Iya Aliyu (born 24 September 1948) is the 20th president of the Nigerian Association of Chambers of Commerce, Industry, Mines and Agriculture (NACCIMA) and the second female president after Alaba Lawson.

Saratu is a Nigerian business director and the Managing Director of Sarat Group of Company. She has her B.Ed from the Ahmadu Bello University (ABU), Zaria, Nigeria.

She lectured at Kaduna State Polytechnic and ABU. She is a recipient of the “Paragon of Excellence and Impetus for Greater Services to our Fatherland” by Abubakar Tafawa Foundation and “Ambassador for Peace” by Inter Religious and Interactional Federation for World Peace.

Before this position, she used to be the President of Police Officers’ Wives Association, Yola chapter; President of Police Officers’ Wives Association, Kaduna chapter; President, Public Officers’ Wives Association, Yola; Vice-President, Retired Armed Forces and Police Officers Association; Treasurer, Forum for African Women Educationists and Life Member, Planned Parenthood Federation of Nigeria.

== Background ==
Sarafut was born September 24, 1948, in Lagos Nigeria. Her spouse, Nuhu Aliyu Labbo is a senator of the federal republic of Nigeria. She graduated from Ahmadu Bello University, Zaria, Kaduna state Nigeria with Bachelor's degree in Education. She has lectured at Kaduna State Polytechnic and ABU. She is a farmer.

== Career ==
She is the immediate past chairperson of the coalition of the Northern State chambers of commerce, the 1st and 2nd deputy president NACCIMMA, National Vice President NACCIMA, President Kaduna chambers, 1st and 2nd Deputy President Kaduna chambers and treasurer NACCIMA. She's has occupied various positions in the Nigerian private sector;Chairperson of Job Creation and Sustainable Livelihood UNDP Assisted programme, Commerce Vice President Nigeria American Chamber of Commerce Kaduna Chapter, Vice Chairman Agricultural Trade Group of Kaduna Chambers, Member UNDP Stakeholders Board on job Creation & Sustainable Livelihood, Kaduna, Member Coordinating unit of poverty eradication Programme in Kaduna, Member Nigerian Shippers Council, Member FEAP stakeholders Board and treasurer Nigeria Niger Chamber of Commerce.

== Awards and honors ==
- Paragon of Excellence and Impetus for Greater Services to our Fatherland” by Abubakar Tafawa Foundation
- Ambassador for Peace” by Inter Religious & Interactional Federation for World Peace.
