= Eshugbayi Eleko =

Oba of Lagos (1901 - 1925; 1931 - 1932)

Oba Eshugbayi Eleko
- Oba of Lagos; Eleko of Eko

Oba of Lagos (first term)
- Reign: 1901–1925
- Coronation: 1901
- Predecessor: Oyekan I
- Successor: Ibikunle Akintoye

Oba of Lagos (second term)
- Reign: 1931–1932
- Predecessor: Sanusi Olusi
- Successor: Falolu Dosunmu
- Born: Eshugbayi Eleko; Lagos, Nigeria
- Died: 24 October 1932; Lagos
- Burial: Iga Idunganran
- House: Dosunmu, Ologun Kutere
- Religion: Ifá

Oba Eshugbayi Eleko (died 1932), alias "Eleko of Eko", was the Oba of Lagos from 1901 to 1925, and from 1931 to 1932. His father was Oba Dosunmu. Eleko's struggles and legal victory over the British colonial government symbolized the struggle between indigenous rights and colonial rule in Nigeria. The outcome of the "Eleko Affair" led to the Eleko's deposition as Oba and deportation to Oyo between 1925 and 1931, years that some historians now call the "interregnum years", and that saw the reigns of Oba Ibikunle Akitoye (from 1925 to 1928) and Oba Sanusi Olusi (from 1928 to 1931).

== Obaship ==
Oba Eleko succeeded Oba Oyekan I upon Oyekan's death in 1901 and was officially recognized by the British colonial government in Lagos under the governorship of William MacGregor. Those who lost out to Eleko for the Obaship in 1901 include Jose Dawodu, Oduntan, and Adamaja.

== Eleko's opposition to the British colonial government's water tax ==
In 1908, the British colonial government (Governor Walter Egerton) proposed the introduction of pipe-borne water in Lagos (at a cost of £130,000) to improve sanitary conditions and argued that Lagosians should pay for the water scheme. Oba Eleko opposed the scheme noting that Lagosians could live off well-water and that it was the Europeans in Lagos who needed the pipe-borne water and that Europeans ought to pay for the water project. Despite the Eleko's objections, construction for the Iju Waterworks commenced and as a result, Oba Eleko instigated a protest of about 15,000 Lagosians on the Lagos Government House. Riots followed the protest and European shops in Lagos were looted. The water tax issue split the Lagos elite into the pro-government camp (Kitoyi Ajasa, Dr. John Randle, Dr. Obasa, Henry Carr, Candido da Rocha, Chief Obanikoro, Chief Alli Balogun) and the anti-government group (Herbert Macaulay, J. Began Benjamin, Dr. Adeniyi Jones, Dr. Caulrick). Some such as Dr. Obasa and Randle were initially in the anti-government camp but back pedaled after getting threats of being seditious and engaging in activities inimical to the war effort. This was depicted in the 2019 biopic, The Herbert Macaulay Affair.

== Eleko's clash with the government over Central Mosque appointments ==
Oba Eleko's other troubles with the colonial government manifested in 1919 when the Oba approved the appointment of 4 Jamat Muslims to the titles of Balogun, Bashorun, Seriki Musillimi and Bey at the Central Mosque. The colonial government felt the Oba overstepped his bounds and that the appointment ought to have been a strictly religious affair with the government's blessing. The government, in what can be seen as retaliating for the riots over the pipe-borne water scheme, withdrew its recognition of the Oba and suspended his stipend. The government's antagonism toward Oba Eleko raised his profile with Lagosians; the colonial government's punitive measure had the unintended consequence of raising the Eleko's profile because the local chiefs and local merchants flooded the Eleko with financial support. Governor Hugh Clifford would later in the year reinstate Oba Eshugbayi Eleko.

== The "Eleko Affair" ==
The "Eleko Affair" centered on The Eleko's Staff of Office, the Oluwa Land Case, and the Eleko's refusal to deny and dissociate himself from Herbert Macaulay's statement in London about the colonial government in Lagos. Before Herbert Macaulay's visit to London on behalf of Chief Amodu Tijani (Oluwa of Lagos) over the landmark Oluwa Land Case, the colonial government received intelligence that Macaulay planned to take the Oba's Staff of Office with him but the Staff was nowhere to be found. This was because it was hidden in the grave of one Adamaja (a one time pretender to the Obaship of Lagos) on orders by Christopher Sapara Williams who supported Adamaja's candidature in 1900. Macaulay is said to have raided Adamaja's grave at night with his bricklayer (one Lawani Kafo), resealed the grave and hid the Staff of Office in his wall at Kristen Hall (Macaulay's residence) until 1919 when he gave it to a lawyer Awoona Renner, who rendezvoused with Macaulay and Chief Amodu Tijani (Oluwa of Lagos) in Accra on their way to London. With the Accra rendezvous, Macaulay prevented the colonial government from getting in the way of his possession of the Oba's Staff of Office. When Macaulay was in London, he embarrassed the colonial government in Lagos by issuing a statement that Eleko Eshugbayi was the head of 17 million Nigerian and that the Eleko, whose grand father (Oba Dosunmu) ceded Lagos to the British via the Lagos Treaty of Cession in 1861, received less pay than the lowest paid European gardener. Macaulay also noted that while Dosunmu was promised a pension equal to that of the net revenue of the colony, the promise was not kept and that as of 1920, the net revenue of Nigeria was £4 million! Macaulay want further stating that the Eleko was “The chief negro" in possession of 3 times the size of Great Britain. The colonial government was embarrassed and interpreted the representation as Eleko being King of all Nigeria. As a result, the government asked Eleko to publicly rebut Macaulay's statement. Eleko, in turn, issued a press release denying Macaulay's statement but the government was not satisfied. It wanted Eleko's bell ringers to produce a denial produced by Henry Carr, Resident of Lagos Colony, which Oba Eshugbayi bluntly refused. The colonial government retaliated with the suspension of the Oba's stipend and official withdrawal of government recognition.

== Eleko's deposition and deportation to Oyo ==
Without the Oba's cooperation, the colonial government couldn't effectively run Lagos. Tensions persisted, eventually manifesting with a colonial government ordinance deposing and removing the Oba to Oyo on August 6, 1925. Oba Eshugbayi didn't comply with the order and on August 8, 1925, he was arrested and exiled to Oyo. With Oba Eleko exiled, Oba Ibikunle Akitoye ruled from 1925 to 1928 and Oba Sanusi Olusi ruled from 1928 to 1931. While Oba Eleko was exiled, his lawyers continued to fight his deportation and went before the Privy Council in Britain who issued a directive requesting a review of the Oba's deportation. With things looking favorable to the Oba after many years in exile, the incoming Governor of Lagos, Sir Donald Cameron, in what was viewed as a political masterstroke, decided to settle the issue out of court and allowed Oba Eshugbayi Eleko to return. Consequently, Cameron won the praise of many Lagosians.

== Eleko's triumphant return from exile ==
Oba Eleko returned to a jubilant Lagos crowd who cheered him and carried him to his palace. Overwhelmed with emotion, the Eleko fainted and had to be revived. The Eleko also burst out in song praising Herbert Macaulay, who had been a strong advocate. Oba Sanusi Olusi vacated Iga Idungaran for Oba Eleko and was compensated with a £1,000 house along Broad Street by the British colonial government plus an annual allowance of £400.

== Death ==
Oba Eshugbayi Eleko died on October 24, 1932, was buried at Iga Idunganran, and was succeeded by Oba Falolu Dosunmu.
