= 2019 Lagos school collapse =

Nigerian disaster

- Date: 13 March 2019; 7 years ago
- Time: c. 10:00 (GMT)
- Location: Lagos, Nigeria
- Cause: Poor engineering
- Deaths: 20

On 13 March 2019, a three-story building in the Ita Faaji area of Lagos, Nigeria suffered a structural collapse, killing 20 people and leaving over 40 trapped. A school, housing 100 students, was located on the third story of the building, leading to the story gaining significant coverage in local and international media.

The building, located at No. 53, Massey Street, Ita-Faaji, Lagos Island was a three-story building with a penthouse and a primary school (Ohen Nursery and Primary School) on the second floor, prior to its collapse on the morning of the 13th. The Governor of Lagos State when the incident happened, Akinwunmi Ambode said the primary school was illegally occupying the building as the building is registered as a residential building.

== Background ==
According to Akinwunmi Ambode, the governor of Lagos State, the primary school and nursery had been operating illegally in a residential building. Ambode stated that many buildings in the area were certified "distressed" and had been marked for demolition, but that landlords resisted the efforts of the government to demolish the buildings, opting to refurbish them for further use. A resident of the area stated that the building in question had been marked for demolition twice before the collapse.

== Collapse ==
The collapse occurred in the Lagos Island district in Lagos, Nigeria at mid-morning on 13 March 2019. The collapsed building—which was slated to be demolished—was in poor condition, but was illegally being used to house commercial businesses, residential apartments, a primary school, and a nursery. The collapse of the structure killed several people and left over 60 people trapped in the rubble; many of those trapped were children from the third floor primary school. Over the next few days, rescue efforts succeed in recovering 45 people from the building, while another 20 were reported as having died in the collapse. According to neighborhood residents, the building was known to be in bad shape, and Ambode confirmed that the bottom two floors of the building had settled. Residents reported that only the absence of many students (who were participating in an out-of-school sporting event) prevented the death toll from being higher.

The Lagos State Emergency Management Agency in a tweet said that 18 people died from the collapse and 41 were injured.

Of the 65 people in the building, 37 were rescued.

== Effects ==
On 19 March 2019, the Lagos State Government set up an investigating and advisory committee on the collapsed building. The committee Chairman is Wasiu Olokunola.

Following the collapse of the building, the State Building Control Agency (LASBCA) conducted integrity testing on buildings in the area and found that 150 buildings were in certified structural distress. The LASBCA procured court approval to demolish 80 of these buildings, and began demolition efforts two days following the collapse, giving little warning to residents.

== See also ==
- 2006 Lagos building collapses
- 2016 Lagos building collapse
- 2021 Lagos high-rise collapse
