= Iyalode =

Female chieftaincy title amongst the Yoruba

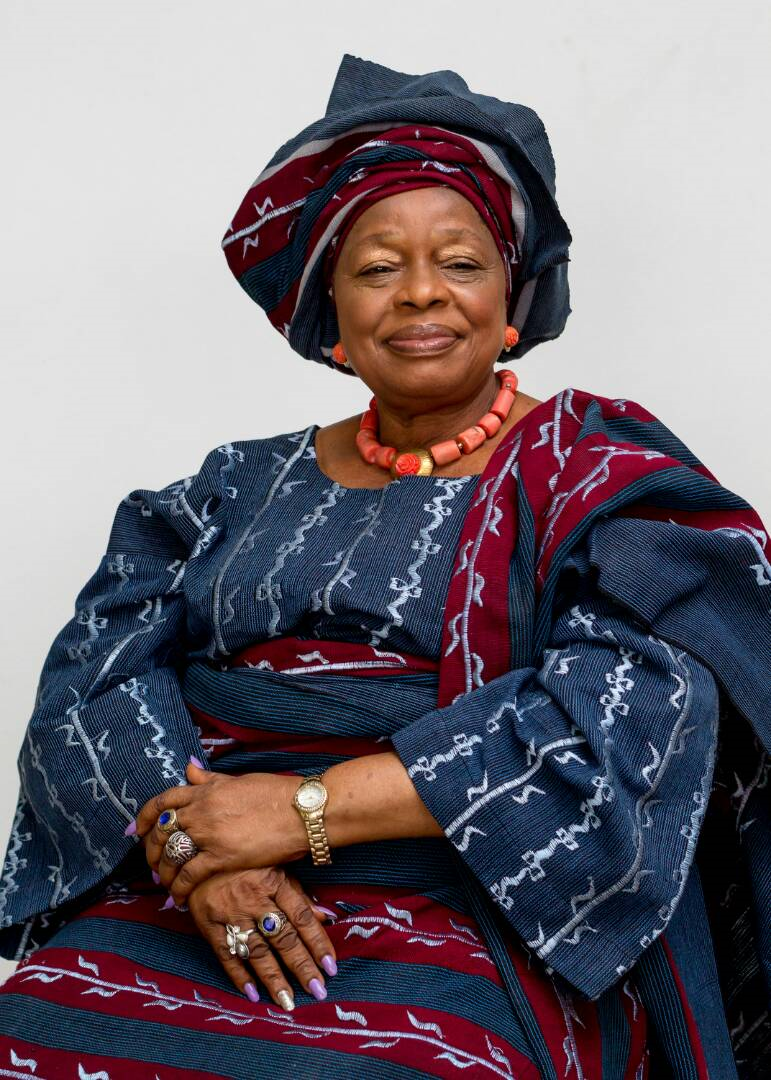
Oloye Alaba Lawson, the Ìyálóde of Yorubaland.

The Ìyálóde is a high-ranking female chieftain in most of the Yoruba traditional states. The title is currently within the gift of the obas, although Njoku asserted in 2002 that the process of choosing an Ìyálóde in pre-colonial Nigeria was less of a choice by the monarch, and more of the accomplishment and involvement of the woman to be so honoured in economic and political matters.

== History ==
Historically, therefore, the Ìyálóde did not only serve as a representative of women in the council, but also as a political and economic influencer in precolonial and colonial Nigeria.

Referred to in Yoruba mythology as Oba Obirin or "King of the Women", an Ìyálóde's views are normally considered in the decision-making process by the council of high chiefs. In 2017, Olatunji from Tai Solarin University of Education likened the role played by an Ìyálóde to that of modern-day feminism. He went further by explaining that a 19th-century Ìyálóde, Madam Tinubu, was one of the richest people in Yorubaland, and served as a major player in who became king in both Lagos - where she married an oba - and Egbaland - where she contributed to the war effort of her fellow Egbas.

Mosadomi opined that the influence of the Ìyálóde has never been limited to being just among the women, but transcends her official duties and includes the entire political, cultural and religious structure of the Yoruba people, citing Tinubu and Efunsetan Aniwura as obvious examples. Sofola (1991) corroborates this by stating that "No matter how powerful an Oba may be, he can never be an Ìyálóde". According to Professor Olasupo, the authority of the Ìyálóde title in modern Nigeria is not as extensive as it once was. An Alaafin of Oyo, Lamidi Adeyemi, identified cultural extinction caused by "modernity" as reasons for the development. He recalled that women had more important roles in the leadership circle of Yorubaland in the past. For example, Tinubu is reported to have wielded so much power that she stopped the Oba of Lagos from making Lagos a British colony for a period.

== See also ==
- Erelu Kuti
- Iyoba
- Queen mothers in Africa
