= Gabaro =

Oba of Lagos
- Reign: 1755–1760
- Coronation: 1755
- Predecessor: Ado
- Successor: Akinsemoyin
- Born: Lagos
- Died: Lagos
- Burial: Benin
- Issue: Eletu Kekere
- Father: Ado
- Religion: Yoruba religion

Oba Gabaro (original Bini name was Guobaro) who reigned from 1669–1704 was the third Oba of Lagos, son and heir to Oba Ado, and grandson of Ashipa. His siblings were Akinsemoyin, and Erelu Kuti.

== Oba of Lagos ==
In collaboration with the descendants of Olofin, Gabaro moved the seat of government from Iddo Island to Lagos Island and established Iga Idunganran as the Oba's residence. Like his father, Ado, he collected yearly tributes from his subjects remitted to the Oba of Benin. Oba Gabaro established chieftaincy institutions and invested Olofin's descendants with chieftaincy titles, making them white cap chiefs while distinguishing Benin chiefs with silk hats.
