= George building collapse =

2024 building collapse in South Africa

- Date: 6 May 2024
- Time: (SAST)
- Venue: NEO Victoria
- Location: 75 Victoria St, Dormehls Drift, George, South Africa; 33°57′42″S 22°27′12″E
- Deaths: 34
- Injuries: 16

On 6 May 2024, an apartment building collapsed while under construction in George, South Africa, resulting in 34 deaths.

== Casualties ==
Thirty-four construction workers were killed in the collapse or died later as a result of their injuries. Sixty-two people were on site at the time of the collapse, many of whom were rescued alive in a 10-day rescue and recovery operation. The last survivor Gabriel Guambe was rescued on Friday 10 May after five days (118 hours) trapped under the rubble.

== Background ==
In August 2020, Erf 15098 was sold for R 2.07 million to Pacific Breeze Trading 91. In March 2021, the owners of the land applied to increase the proposed building from four to five storeys and include 66 parking bays in an underground basement parking lot. The developer, Neo Trend Group Ice Projects, submitted its final plans in December 2022 and they were approved by the municipality in July 2023. On 14 March 2024, the plans were signed off by engineering firm Mitchell & Associates.

== Investigation into collapse ==
A preliminary report on the collapse was handed to the Western Cape Premier on 1 August 2024, but by November the results of various probes into the collapse had not yet been announced. Atholl Mitchell, the technologist responsible for signing off the plans for the building, was placed on precautionary suspension by the Engineering Council of South Africa (ECSA) following the collapse. The ECSA was investigating an unrelated complaint against Mitchell at the time of the collapse, and has since ordered engineering reports on all other projects that Mitchell's company was involved in.

Many survivors who are unemployed due to injuries received in the collapse reported that by December, 7 months later, they had still not received compensation promised to them.
