= Alaba Lawson =

Nigerian business magnate and academic (1951–2023)

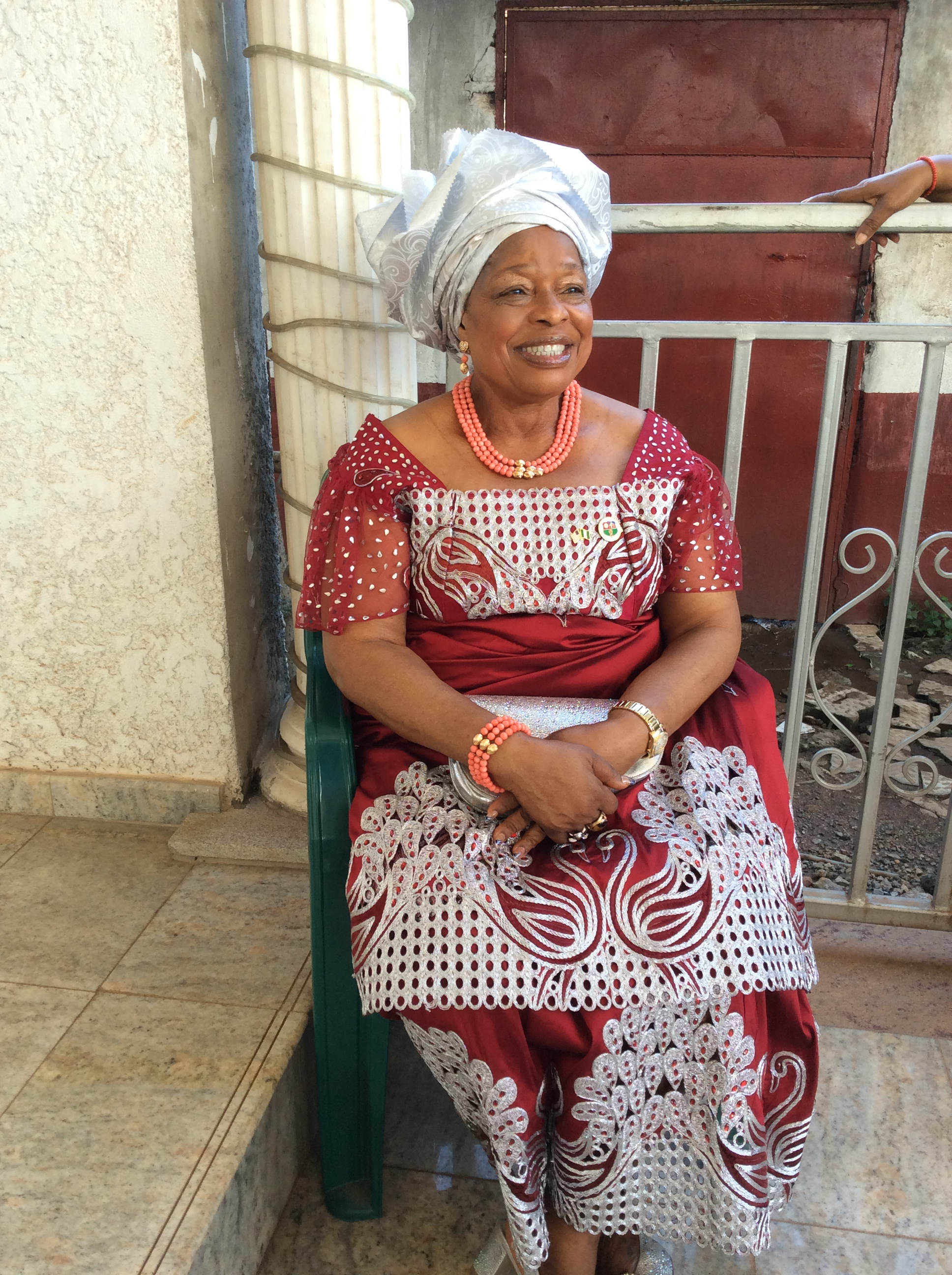
- Born: 18 January 1951; Abeokuta, Ogun State, Colony and Protectorate of Nigeria
- Died: 28 October 2023 (aged 72)
- Other name: Iyalode Alaba Lawson
- Education: Abeokuta Girls Grammar School; St. Nicholas Montessori Teachers’ Training College
- Occupations: Business magnate; author; academic; aristocrat
- Years active: 1977–2023
- Employer: NACCIMA
- Board member of: Chairman, Board of Governing Council, Moshood Abiola Polytechnic, Ogun State
- Website: alabalawson.org

Chief Alaba Oluwaseun Lawson (18 January 1951 – 28 October 2023) was a Nigerian business magnate and academic. She was the first female president of the National Association of Chambers of Commerce, Industry, Mines and Agriculture and chairman of the board of the Governing Council, Moshood Abiola Polytechnic, Ogun State.

Chief Lawson was also the president pro-tempore of the Forum of Female Traditional Rulers in Nigeria.

== Early life and education ==
Born into the Jiboku-Taiwo family of Abeokuta, the capital of Ogun State, she completed her primary and secondary school education at St. James' African Primary School, Idi-Ape, Abeokuta between 1957 and 1962 and Abeokuta Girls Grammar School, Abeokuta, leaving in 1968. She proceeded to St. Nicholas Montessori Teachers’ Training College at Prince's Gate, England in 1973 where she obtained a 1st Class Diploma in Education.

== Life and career ==
Lawson started her teaching career in 1969 at Children House School, Ibara. In England, she taught at Queen's Gate Montessori Nursery School and Mill Hill Nursery and Junior School. She came back to Nigeria in 1977 to set up her own school, Lawson's Childcare Nursery and Primary School, now the Lawson Group of Schools.

Lawson later established a trading/distributing firm known as Capricorn Stores Ltd, between 1968 and 1996, where she had distributing outlets with Nigerian Breweries Ltd, Nigerian Bottling Company Ltd, Guinness Nigeria Ltd, West African Portland Cement Ltd etc.

She became the president of the Abeokuta Chambers of Commerce in 1995 and later became the President of Ogun Council of Chambers of Commerce in year 2000 and headed it till 2002. In 2009 she set up Abestone Microfinance Bank.

On 25 May 2017, Lawson became the first woman to be elected president of the National Association of Chambers of Commerce, Industry, Mines and Agriculture (NACCIMA) following the end of the tenure of Dr. Benny Edem.

Alaba Lawson died on 28 October 2023, at the age of 72.

== Chieftaincy Titles ==
- The Otun of Oko
- The Asiwaju Iyalode of Egbaland
- The Otun Iyalode of the Egba Christians
- The Iyalode of Egbaland (since deposed)
- The Iyalode of Yorubaland

== See also ==
- Abiola Dosunmu
