= Uyo church collapse =

Building collapse in Uyo, Nigeria

- Date: 10 December 2016; 9 years ago
- Location: Uyo, Nigeria
- Cause: Under investigation
- Deaths: 27 to 160

On 10 December 2016, the roof of the Reigners Bible Church International, an evangelical congregation, collapsed in Uyo, a city in Akwa Ibom State, Nigeria, during the consecration or ordination of the local bishop. At least 23 people are confirmed to have died in the disaster, with other reports stating numbers as high as 160. Thousands were present at the time of collapse, including government officials and Akwa Ibom governor Udom Gabriel Emmanuel.

== Collapse ==
At approximately 11 a.m. (WAT), thirty minutes into the church's Saturday morning programme, the building's roof collapsed from the centre. The church had been under construction until shortly before the incident, with some reports stating that work was unfinished at the time of collapse. The construction had been rushed to prepare the church for the ordination of the local bishop. Varying numbers of deaths were reported. The News Agency of Nigeria reported that there were 60 victims, and a rescue official stated that 60 bodies had been retrieved. More than 100 bodies had been seen at the local morgue, and staff at the University of Uyo Teaching Hospital reported 160 killed.

== See also ==
- 2014 Synagogue Church building collapse
- 2016 Lagos building collapse
