= Akinsemoyin =

Oba of Lagos
- Reign: c1704 - 1749
- Predecessor: Gabaro
- Successor: Eletu Kekere
- Born: Lagos
- Died: Lagos
- Burial: Benin
- Issue: Sadeko, Amore/Olukokun, Abisako, Jolasun, Gbosebi and Aina Egbe
- Father: Ado

Oba Akinsemoyin reigned as Oba of Lagos from around 1704 to 1749. His father was Oba Ado and his siblings were Erelu Kuti and Oba Gabaro, whom he succeeded.

According to the Justice J. O. Kassim tribunal of inquiry report of 19 September 1978, there are six recognised sons of Akinsemoyin, namely, Sadeko, Amore/Olukokun, Abisako, Jolasun, Gbosebi and Aina Egbe.

The following are some of the prominent descendants of Akinsemoyin's daughters: Onisiwo, Oniru, Oluwa, and Akogun.

== Exile in Badagry under Oba Gabaro's reign and commercial activities ==
Akinsemoyin had a disagreement with his brother, Oba Gabaro over installation of Olofin's descendants as chiefs, resulting in Akinsemoyin's banishment to Badagry. At Badagry, Akinsemoyin was exposed to commerce and built relationships with European slave traders.

== Ascendancy and introduction of slavery to Lagos ==
When Gabaro died, Akinsemoyin became Oba around 1704 despite Gabaro having a son, Eletu Kekere or in some accounts Eletu Omo. Akinsemoyin established the slave trade in Lagos by inviting Portuguese and Brazilian slave merchants whom he had met in exile at Badagry. Historian J. F. Ade Ajayi asserted that Akinsemoyin granted a monopoly on slave trade to his Brazilian and Portuguese trading partners. Lagos, in time, overtook the ports of Whydah and Porto Novo as the leading slave port in the Bight of Benin.

Under Akinsemoyin's reign, Iga Idunganran was for the first time covered with tiles, reportedly presented as gifts by Portuguese slave merchants.

== Death ==
Akinsemoyin died in 1749. Though he had 4 sons, was succeeded as Oba by Eletu Kekere, Gabaro's son.

== Legacy ==
Of Oba Ado's 3 children - Gabaro, Akinsemoyin, and Erelu Kuti, only Akinsemoyin's lineage has so far failed to produce an Oba of Lagos. Apart from Gabaro's son, Eletu Kekere, all other Obas have been direct descendants of Erelu Kuti starting with Ologun Kutere. This "apparent irregularity" is now the subject of controversy and litigation as Akinsemoyin's descendants are challenging the enthronement of the current Oba of Lagos, Rilwan Akiolu, in court.
