= Ibikunle Akitoye =

- Oba of Lagos
- Reign: 1925-1928
- Coronation: 1925
- Predecessor: Eshugbayi Eleko
- Successor: Sanusi Olusi
- Born: Ibikunle Akitoye; 1871; Lagos, Nigeria
- Died: 1928 (aged 56–57); Lagos
- Religion: Christianity

Ibikunle Akitoye
- Education: CMS Grammar School, Lagos

Ibikunle Alfred Akitoye (1871–1928) was Oba of Lagos from 1925 to 1928 during what some historians refer to as the "Interregnum" years of the exiled Oba Eshugbayi Eleko. Ibikunle Akitoye was the first western educated and Christian Oba of Lagos. Akitoye's reign also marked the association of Lagos Obas with non-traditional religions.

== Early years and career ==
Ibikunle Alfred Akitoye, grandson of Oba Akitoye, was born in Lagos in 1871 and was educated at CMS Grammar School. He apprenticed as a book keeper with a German firm and thereafter worked as an Assistant Railway Service Paymaster. Following his time with the Railway Service, he entered private business as a cotton goods and textiles agent. Another source states that he started as a clerk with a firm of British merchants in Lagos.

== Christian faith and ascendancy to the Obaship of Lagos ==
Ibikunle Akitoye was President of the United Native Africa Church (UNA). Ibikunle Akitoye was elected Oba of Lagos by members of the Lagos Ruling House on 26 June 1925, following the deposition of Oba Eshugbayi Eleko via an order to vacate Iga Idunganran by the same members of the Lagos Ruling House on 10 June 1925. Akitoye's election was recognized by the British colonial government on 6 August and was received at the colonial government house on 9 August 1925. The deposed Eshugbayi Eleko was deported to Oyo on 8 August 1925, in accordance with the Deposed Chiefs Removal Ordinance.

== Later years and death ==
After Eshugbayi's forced exile to Oyo, there was agitation for his return led by his senior chiefs, Chief Abudu Bamgbobu, the Eletu Odibo of Lagos, and Chief Amodu Tijani, the Oluwa of Lagos. Protests were organised and led by Herbert Macaulay to vehemently attack the Colonial Government's deposition of Oba Eshugbayi. Ibikunle Akitoye was spurned by the people who attacked him in 1926.

In June 1928, the Privy Council decided that the deposed Eshugbayi Eleko could apply for a writ of Habeas Corpus, a decision which put Akitoye's Obaship in a precarious situation. Oged Macaulay (Herbert Macaulay's son) noted that when Ibikunle Akitoye learned about the Privy Council decision, he went to Herbert Macaulay's Kirsten Hall residence to view the cablegram from London. Upon viewing the cablegram, Akitoye is said to have gone home, started drinking, and loaded his revolver. The next day Oba Ibikunle Akitoye was dead and the government ruled out foul play. Sanusi Olusi was installed as Oba of Lagos following Ibikunle Akitoye's death.
