= Lagos State Ministry of Special Duties =

Ministry in Nigeria

Lagos State Ministry of Special Duties & Intergovernmental Relations

Ministry overview
- Jurisdiction: Government of Lagos State
- Headquarters: State Government Secretariat, Alausa, Lagos State, Nigeria
- Ministry executive: Gbenga Oyerinde, Commissioner

The Lagos State Ministry of Special Duties is the state government ministry, charged with the responsibility to plan, devise and implement the state policies on Special Duties. The ministry was created to effectively arm and develop appropriate synergy between the Ministry of Special Duties and Intergovernmental Relations, MDAs, relevant stakeholders and the general public for a safe and disaster free environment aided by the application of innovation, research and development.

== See also ==
- Lagos State Ministry of Local Government and Chieftaincy Affairs
- Lagos State Executive Council
