= Eletu Kekere =

Oba of Lagos
- Reign: c1775 - c1780
- Predecessor: Akinsemoyin
- Successor: Ologun Kutere
- Born: Lagos
- Died: Lagos
- Burial: Benin
- Father: Gabaro

Oba Eletu Kekere, son of Oba Gabaro, reigned briefly as Oba of Lagos following Oba Akinsemoyin's death in 1775. Not much is known about Eletu Kekere's reign other than him being childless.
