= Adeyinka Oyekan =

Oba Adeyinka Oyekan II
- Oba of Lagos
- Reign: 1965–2003
- Coronation: 1965
- Predecessor: Adeniji Adele
- Successor: Rilwan Akiolu
- Born: Adeyinka Oyekan; 30 June 1911 (N.S.: 30 June 1911); Lagos, Southern Nigeria Protectorate
- Died: 1 March 2003 (aged 91); Lagos, Nigeria
- Burial: Iga Idunganran
- House: Ologun Kutere
- Father: Prince Kusanu Abiola Oyekan
- Religion: Christianity

Adeyinka Oyekan II (30 June 1911 – 1 March 2003) was Oba of Lagos from 1965 to 2003. He was the grandson of Oba Oyekan I.

== Early life and education ==
Adeyinka's father was a Methodist teacher, Prince Kusanu Abiola Oyekan. Adeyinka Oyekan attended the Methodist Boys' High School, Lagos, and King's College, Lagos before studying Pharmacy at Yaba College of Higher Education. A devout Christian, he was a member of the Tinubu Methodist Church and former Sunday School teacher.

== Career ==
After graduating from Yaba Higher College, Adeyinka was employed at General Hospital, Lagos in 1933.

In 1965, Adeyinka was installed Oba and subsequently became a member of the Western House of Chiefs; this was during a crisis in the western region of Nigeria which resulted in loss of lives. He reigned as Lagos Monarch from 1965 till 2003. Adeyinka Oyekan was the second Christian Oba of Lagos, the first being Ibikunle Akitoye. He was considered a pacifist and bridge builder during his reign. Adeyinka Oyekan was also a pharmacist under the Methodist Mission at Amachara and Umuahia in the then East Central State of Nigeria. During World War II, he served as a sergeant in the Third Field Ambulance 81st (W.A.) Division. After his military service he was employed with the Lagos State Ministry of Health.

== Descendants ==
A prominent descendant is his son, Oba Mobandele Oyekan of Ilado, whose official title as a monarch is Onilado of Ilado.
