= Ebute Ero =

- Town
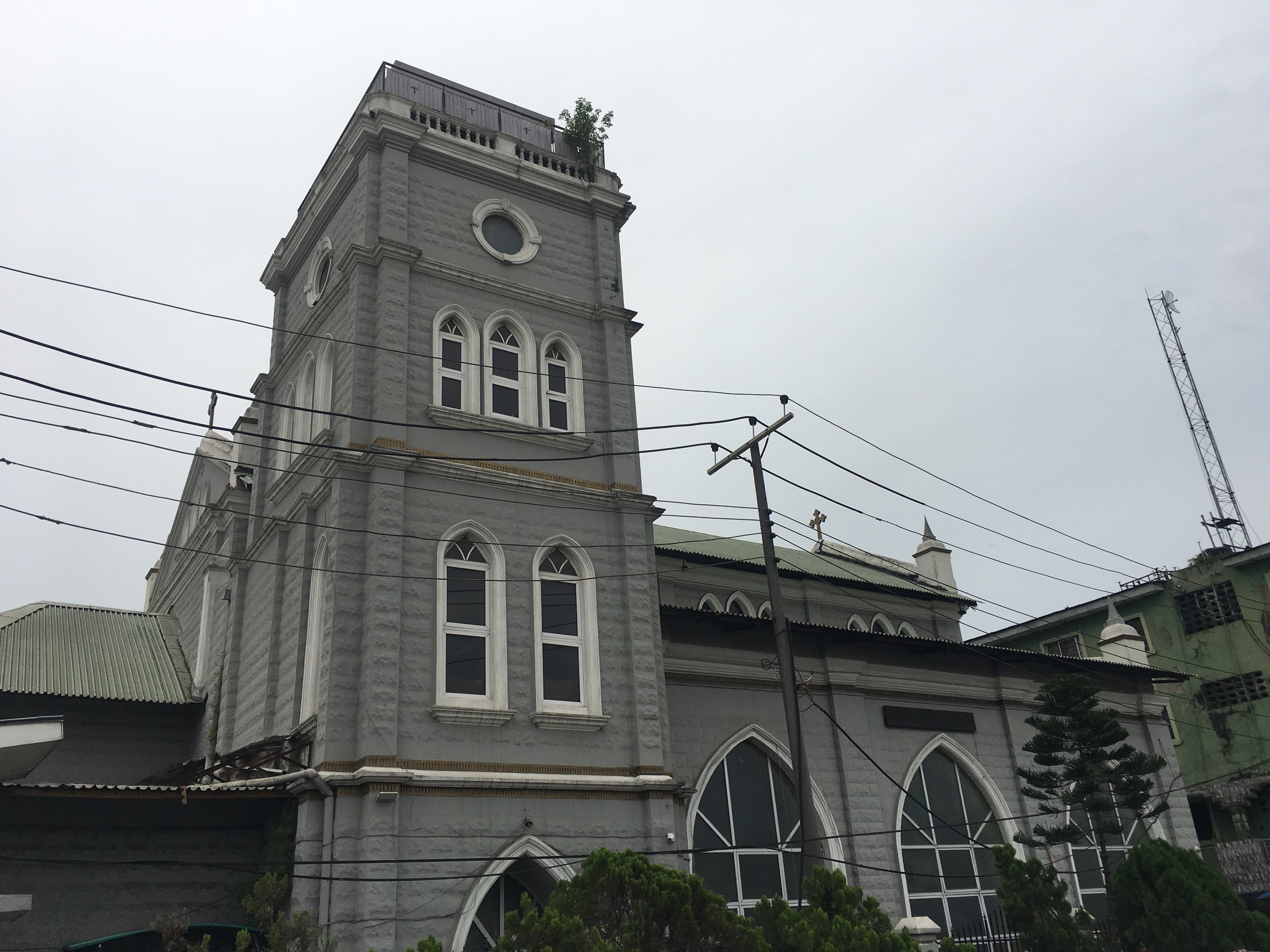
- Trinity Church in Ebute Ero, built by Anglican missionaries and established as a mission station in 1852

- Location within Nigeria
- Coordinates: 6°27′47″N 3°23′15″E
- Country: Nigeria
- State: Lagos State
- Time zone: UTC+1 (WAT)

Ebute Ero is a town in Lagos State south-western Nigeria. It is located in Lagos Island Local Government Area. Ebute Ero is part of Lagos Metropolitan Area. The town was a major communication link between the new and old citizens of Lagos and a market called Ebute Ero market located in the town is one of the largest and oldest markets in Nigeria.

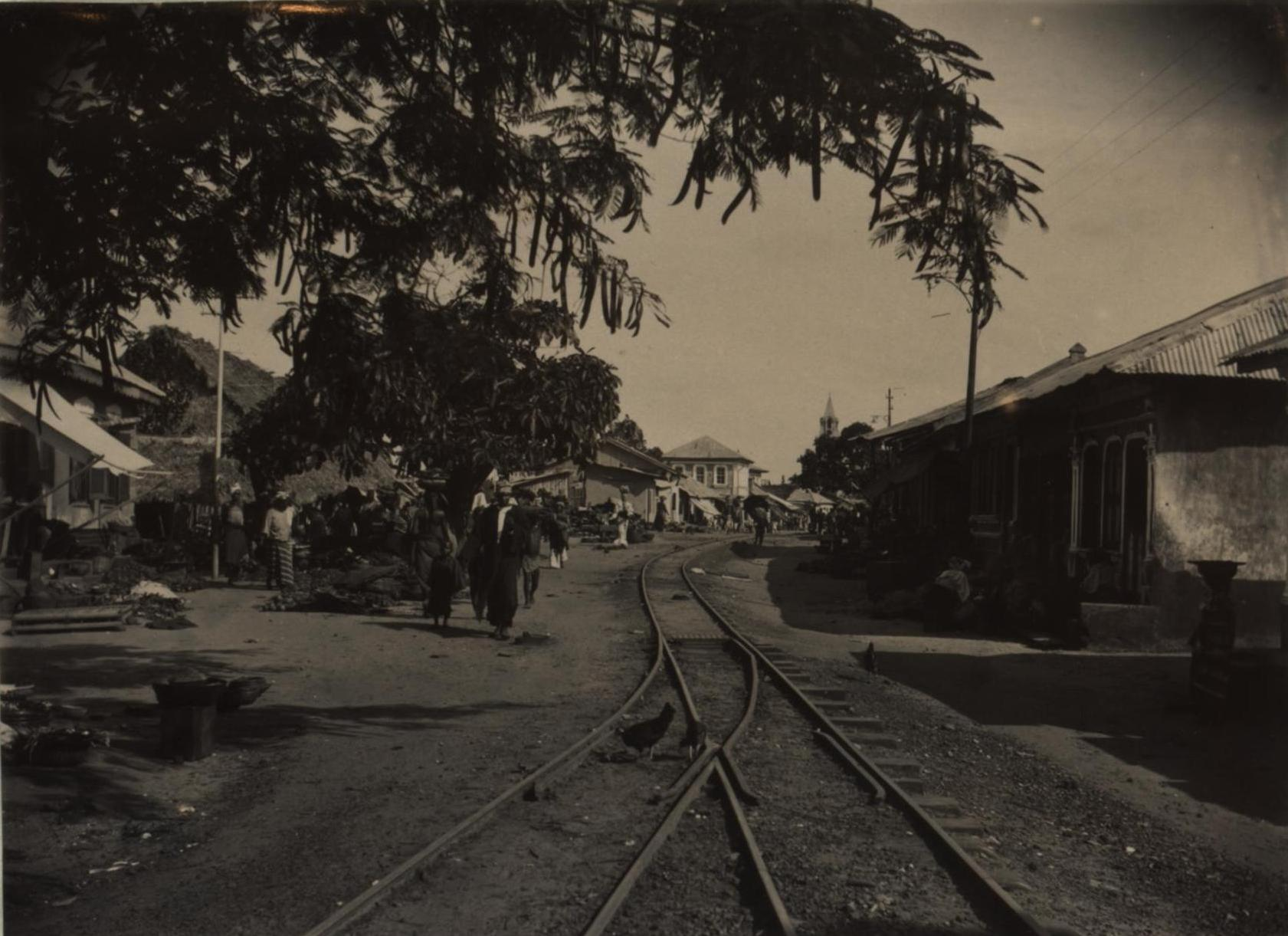
Ebute-Ero street, showing Tram Lines (between 1910 and 1913)

== Ebute-Ero Helpers Market Women’s Union ==
In 1961, the Ebute-Ero Helpers Market Women’s Union was formally registered under the Registration of Business Names Act.

The Union represented the collective interests of women traders at Ebute-Ero and became the only legally recognized women’s organization in the market. By the 1970s, the Union was led by Alhaja Adeniyi Oqowobi (President), A.A. Badaru (Secretary), and Mrs. Doyin Bankole (Treasurer).

In an October 1975 petition to the press and government, the Union emphasized that it had the full support of the market women and rejected claims of rival organizations. Copies of the petition were also sent to the Lagos City Council, the Military Governor of Lagos State, and the Oba of Lagos.
