= Falolu Dosunmu =

Oba Falolu Dosunmu

Oba of Lagos
- Reign: 1932–1949
- Coronation: 1932
- Predecessor: Eshugbayi Eleko
- Successor: Adeniji Adele
- Born: Falolu Dosunmu; Lagos, Nigeria
- Died: September 2, 1949; Lagos
- Burial: Iga Idunganran
- House: Dosunmu
- Religion: Ifá

'Oba Falolu Dosunmu (died September 2, 1949) served as the Oba of Lagos from 1932 to 1949, succeeding Eshugbayi Eleko. He was a former fisherman and a member of the House of Dosunmu.

== Biography ==
=== Early life ===
Oba Falolu Dosunmu, born as Falolu Dosunmu, was a fisherman before ascending to the throne. Little is known about his early life, including details about his parents and birthdate.

=== Ascendancy to the Throne ===
Upon the death of Oba Eshugbayi Eleko in 1932, a power struggle ensued between the supporters of Sanusi Olusi and those of Falolu Dosunmu. Sanusi Olusi, who had previously stepped aside for Eshugbayi Eleko, sought the Obaship, backed by chiefs who were installed during Eleko's exile. In contrast, supporters of Falolu Dosunmu, including members of the Jamat Muslims, Ilu Committee, and NNDP, advocated for his candidacy. To prevent Sanusi Olusi's re-emergence, the Eshugbayi faction expedited the election process, leading to Falolu Dosunmu's official recognition and installation as the Oba of Lagos on November 3, 1932.

=== Election Protests and the Ward Price Commission ===
Sanusi Olusi's supporters protested against Falolu's election, leading Governor Donald Charles Cameron to establish the Ward-Price Commission in 1933. The commission initially found no established order of selection among the four groups of Lagos chiefs, but public dissatisfaction prompted further action. Governor Cameron appointed a Selection Committee, which ultimately recognized Falolu Dosunmu as the legitimate Oba of Lagos by a majority decision.

=== Reign and Reforms ===
During his reign, Oba Falolu Dosunmu implemented reforms to strengthen the influence of the Obaship institution. Notably, official Obaship archives were initiated, documenting native laws, customs, and meetings between the Oba, chiefs, and the government. Falolu asserted the independence of the Obaship by insisting on holding meetings at his palace or through intermediaries, rejecting the colonial commissioner's attempts to assert authority.

=== Death and legacy ===
Oba Falolu Dosunmu died on September 2, 1949, and was laid to rest at Iga Idunganran. His reign is remembered for the reforms implemented to consolidate the authority of the Obaship institution.

== See also ==
- Obas of Lagos

== Categories ==
- People from Lagos
- 1949 deaths
- Obas of Lagos
- Nigerian royalty
- 20th-century Nigerian people
- History of Lagos
- Yoruba monarchs
- Burials in Lagos State
- People from colonial Nigeria
- Ologun-Kutere family
