= Oyekan I =

Oba Oyekan I
- Oba of Lagos

Oba of Lagos
- Reign: 1885 - 1900
- Coronation: 1885
- Predecessor: Dosunmu
- Successor: Eshugbayi Eleko
- Born: Oyekan; 1871; Lagos, Nigeria
- Died: September 30, 1900 (aged 28–29); Lagos
- Burial: Iga Idunganran
- House: Akitoye, Dosunmu
- Father: Oba Dosunmu

Oba Oyekan I (died September 30, 1900) reigned as the Lagos Monarch from March 1885 - September 30, 1900. He ascended the throne about a month after the death of his father Oba Dosunmu.

== Prince Oyekan vs. Chief Apena Ajasa incident ==
In 1883, Oba Dosunmu, Oyekan's father called a meeting to heal tensions between Chief Apena Ajasa and Chief Taiwo Olowo however Chief Ajasa was threatening to the Oba and other chiefs. On viewing Apena Ajasa's threatening stance, prince Oyekan slapped Chief Ajasa adding that Ajasa should not insult the Oba at Iga Idunganran (the Oba's palace). Oba Dosunmu disapproved Oyekan's actions and cursed him saying "The boy who has thus acted should be lost". Chief Taiwo Olowo, Chief Apena Ajasa's rival, was delighted by Oyekan's action and countered Oba Dosunmu's imprecation saying "The boy shall not be lost but he will live a long life of prosperity"

== Decline in influence of the Obaship during Oyekan's reign ==
The Obaship declined both financially and in terms of influence during Oyekan's reign. Oyekan accepted a drop in income paid by the British colonial government from £1,000 to £200 (eventually raised to £400 in 1898). Oyekan also lacked the backing of powerful chiefs such as Apena Ajasa who he clashed with in 1883. Finally, the lack of support from powerful chiefs such as Apena Ajasa prevented Oyekan from exercising certain legal powers provided for Oba Dosunmu in the 1861 Treaty of Cession.

== Death ==
Oba Oyekan died on Tuesday, September 30, 1900 after being ill for some time. He reigned for 15 years as Oba of Lagos.
