= 2016 Lagos building collapse =

- Date: 9 March 2016
- Location: Lagos, Nigeria
- Cause: Under investigation
- Deaths: 34

Lekki District (Nigeria)

On 8 March 2016, a five-story building collapsed while under construction in Lekki District, Lagos, Nigeria. At least 34 people were killed. Thirteen other people were pulled from the collapsed building alive in a rescue operation that ended late on 10 March.

== Investigation ==
Ibrahim Farinloye, from the National Emergency Management Agency of Nigeria, said in a statement that "Investigation on the cause of the collapse has started by various federal and state agencies". The Lagos state government said in a statement that preliminary reports suggest the building construction was illegal, with the builders having been served a contravention notice for exceeding the number of allowed floors. The owners of the building apparently “criminally unsealed the property and continued building beyond the approved floors". Heavy rain had occurred in the area as well, with some pointing to that as an exacerbating factor.

Victor Suru, a bricklayer working on the building, stated that "After they [the owners] finished building the house, rain fell and the house shifted a bit. They put iron in front of the house, [but] the iron couldn't hold the house. They left it like that and continued building."

== See also ==
- 2006 Lagos building collapses
- 2019 Lagos school collapse
- 2021 Lagos high-rise collapse
