= Foundation integrity testing =

Foundation integrity testing is the non-destructive testing of piled foundations. It was first used in the late 1960s, and has been developed over time by many companies. Three organizations supply a majority of the test equipment in use: CEBTP (Centre Expérimental de Recherches et d'Etudes du Bâtiment et des Travaux Publics) in Europe; Integrity Testing in Asia and Australia: and by GRL in the USA.
