= Ado (Lagos Oba) =

2nd Oba of Lagos

2nd Oba of Lagos
- Reign: 1716–1755
- Coronation: 1716
- Predecessor: Ashipa
- Successor: Gabaro
- Born: Benin
- Issue: Gabaro, Akinsemoyin, Erelu Kuti
- Father: Ashipa

Oba Ado who reigned from 1716-1755 was the second Oba of Lagos. He was son of Ashipa an Awori-Isheri Chieftain appointed as the first ruler of Eko. Ado's son, Gabaro was the third Oba of Lagos.

== Second Oba of Lagos ==
Ado collected yearly tributes from his subjects which in turn were remitted to the Oba of Benin as tribute.
