= Ashipa =

Aṣípa
- 1st Oba of Lagos

Oba of Lagos
- Reign: c. 1682 – c. 1716
- Successor: Ado
- Born: Ashipa (Yoruba: Aṣípa); Isheri Olofin, Aworiland
- Died: 1716; Lagos
- Burial: Lagos
- Issue: Ado
- House: House of Olofin
- Father: Unknown
- Religion: Ifá

Ashipa, the founder of the Lagos royal dynasty but uncrowned as Oba of Lagos, whom all Obas of Lagos trace their lineage to, was an Awori Chieftain from Isheri. Ashipa was rewarded with title of Oloriogun (war chief) after returning the body of one Asheru, a Benin war captain to Benin and received the Oba of Benin's sanction to govern Lagos. Some Benin accounts of history have the Ashipa as son or grandson of the Oba of Benin. According to the Lagos traditional account however, Ashípa (Yoruba: Aṣípa) was a local native, an Awori Yoruba chieftain of Isheri.

Ashipa received a sword and royal drum as symbols of authority from the Oba of Benin on his mission to Lagos. Additionally, the Oba of Benin deployed a group of Benin officers charged with preserving Benin's interests in Lagos. These officers, led by Eletu Odibo, were the initial members of the Akarigbere class of Lagos White Cap Chiefs.
