= Ologun Kutere =

Oba of Lagos (ruled c. 1780–1806)

- Oba of Lagos
- Reign: c. 1780 - 1806
- Predecessor: Eletu Kekere
- Successor: Adele Ajosun
- Born: Ologun Kutere; Lagos
- Died: c. 1803; Lagos
- Issue: Eshinlokun, Adele Ajosun, Akiolu, Olukoya, Olusi and Akitoye.
- House: Ado, Ologun Kutere
- Father: Alaagba
- Mother: Erelu Kuti
- Religion: Ifá

Ologun Kutere reigned as Oba of Lagos from around the 1780s to around 1803. He succeeded Oba Eletu Kekere who reigned between 1775 and 1780. "Ologun" is the Yoruba word for "War General".

Ologun Kutere was the product of the marriage between Erelu Kuti, daughter of Oba Ado, and Alaagba (short form of 'Alagbigba'), an Ijesha traditional adviser to Oba Akinsemoyin. He was the first successor to the throne through a matrilineal line, and the Yoruba line to the throne.

== Life ==
Kutere's father was a famous medicine man in Lagos during the middle 1700s. During his reign, trade between Lagos and Ijebu increased; the Ijebu brought foodstuff in exchange for salt, tobacco, and spirits, and products obtained from Portuguese slave traders. He also made trade policies that were favorable to many businesses, including slave traders. He introduced less regulation and low taxes, which enabled Lagos to become a rival port city to Ouidah and stopped derivation remittance to the Kingdom of Benin. It was during his era that the French banned the slave trade after the French Revolution, which made it more difficult for slave traders in Porto Novo but more favorable to those in Lagos. The city's population grew from an estimated population of 5,000 in the 1780s to 20,000 by the 1810s.

Kutere enhanced Lagos's military power, utilizing a large fleet of war canoes to launch successful attacks on nearby towns and villages, including Badagry. Ologun Kutere was not only wealthy but also feared; so much so that his power was described as "absolute and his disposition tyrannical, to excess".

Kutere had many children, among whom were future Obas, Eshinlokun, Adele Ajosun, and Akitoye. Other children included Akiolu, Olukoya, and Olusi.

== Legacy ==
All Obas of Lagos since Ologun Kutere have been direct descendants of Ologun Kutere. None of the descendants of his mother's siblings has become Oba of Lagos since Kutere's death; neither Oba Gabaro, whose only child Oba Eletu Kekere died without issue before Ologun Kutere's ascension, nor Oba Akinsemoyin who had children, albeit very young at the time of his death. This "apparent irregularity" is now the subject of controversy and litigation as Akinsemoyin's descendants are challenging the enthronement of the current Oba of Lagos, Rilwan Akiolu, in court.

== Sources ==
- Olupona, Jabob (2008). Òrìşà Devotion as World Religion: The Globalization of Yorùbá Religious Culture. Madison: University of Wisconsin Press.
