= Erelu Kuti =

Nigerian royal title

Erelu Kuti of Lagos
- Iya Oba Eko
- Incumbent; Abiola Dosunmu, The Erelu Kuti of Lagos
- Style: Kabiyesi; Her Royal Highness
- Term length: Life tenure

The Erelu Kuti of Lagos is the traditional aristocrat saddled with the bearing of the ritual essence of Oloye Erelu Kuti I, A Yoruba royal born on the 18th century who aided in the consolidation of her homeland.

Erelu Kuti was the only daughter of king Ado and Princess Olugbani, and her brothers, Gabaro and Akinsemoyin. Erelu became the consort to Chief Alagba and bore him two sons. She then became Lagos first queen mother. Her life was so entwined with the early history of her family's kingdom that her lineal descendants have gone on to serve as the ruling branch of its royal dynasty.

== A Series Of Excerpts From The Oral Records Of Lago ==
The Ikadan palace was the home of Erelu Kuti, mother of Ologun Kutere (the fourth king of Lagos, whose reign began in 1750 and lasted 25 years, and the founder of the lineage from which the late Oba Adeyinka Oyekan came) and Shokun (the founder of the Fashina-Jinadu-Bombata, Fadu lineage)

While Akinsemoyin was ruling, Erelu Kuti married Alagba, the high priest that had predicted that her brother would become Oba. Alagba, an Ijesha man from Ilesha, subsequently served as a chief in the court of his brother-in-law.

Oba Akinsemoyin built a palace called Iga Alagba at Idumota for him because he could not belong to the Oba's household as a non-member of the royal family. Akinsemoyin, according to clan history, subsequently had a set of male triplets after having a number of daughters. Because it was a taboo in those days to have twins, let alone triplets, the three boys were smuggled out of the palace. Due to the poor condition under which they were kept, two of them died, leaving one alive. This son went on to live an ordinary life as a commoner.

Due to this, when Akinsemoyin died in 1749 after ruling for 44 years, Ologun Kutere (the product of the union between Erelu Kuti and Alagba) was made Oba in his stead. Though the late king is said to have had other sons after the set of triplets, they are said to have been very young at the time of their father's death.

The first Oba of Lagos was Ado, the son of Prince Ashipa from Isheri Olofin and the daughter of the Oba of Benin Kingdom. Ado had three children, Gabaro, Akinsemoyin and a female, Erelu Kuti. After the death of Ado, his eldest son, Gabaro, succeeded him. After the death of Gabarro Akinsemoyin, his younger brother, succeeded him. After the death of Akinsemoyin Gabaro's son Eletu Kekere succeeded him. Gabaro's line became extinct after the reign of his son Eletu Kekere because he had no child. Afterwards, Ologun Kutere (the product of the union between Erelu Kuti and Alagba, an Ifa priest from Ilesa) was made the Oba of Lagos.

From the official genealogy of the kings of Lagos, history records that the succession of Ologun kuture was followed by the death of Oba Akinsemoyin which caused conspiracy from a faction against his coronation that led to Erelu storming the Iledi Osugbo conclave to seize her son from them. Following this confrontation, she secured the permanent right for herself and all succeeding erelu kuti's to be the only female members permitted within the powerful Iledi Osugbo conclave. Ologun Kutere replaced Akinsemoyin in 1749. Since then, only the descendants of Ologun Kutere have been occupying the position of Oba of Lagos. The late Oba Oyekan II belonged to one of his descendant families.

Now it may be asked how Erelu Kuti came to marry Alagba and what role Akinsemoyin played in the events that led to his sister's marriage. Well, according to the narrative:

On the advice of Alagba, Akinsemoyin performed certain rituals and ceremonies which included putting up a white flag on what is now Victoria Island.

It is said that as a result of this, the Portuguese came and subsequently aided in the architectural advancement of his kingdom. This was the first contact with Europeans in this part of the world, and it heralded the advent of both Christianity and its attendant civilisations. The Portuguese built Iga Idungaran palace for Oba Akinsemoyin as a gift, a part of which is still in existence and is incorporated into the new palace.

Satisfied that all was now well with Oba Akinsemoyin and his people, Alagba then expressed the desire to return to Ilesha for the remaining part of his life. Oba Akinsemoyin agreed and, in gratitude for his years of service, offered him any of his daughters as a wife.

While they were talking about this, Erelu passed by and heard what they were discussing. At a later time, she told her brother that she would gladly marry Alagba if he wished it to be so.

Oba Akinsemoyin is said to have been jubilant. He blessed his sister, conferred a noble title on her and predicted that she would bear children who would reign in Lagos as its kings. The prediction of the Oba eventually came to pass with, as the White Man says, a vengeance.

== Functions ==
The Erelu kuti is the only daughter of Oba Ado, The second Oba of Lagos, and sister to Oba Gabri and Oba Akinsemoyin. The Erelu Kuti of Lagos is ranked third in the kingdom's order of precedence. During her lifetime, she serves as regent when the "stool" of the king, or Oba of Lagos, is vacant. She wielded immense political dominance. As part of the coronation ceremonies for a new oba, she also publicly blesses the Oba prior to its coronation For these reasons, she is regarded as the queen mother of the realm of Eko.

== Incumbent ==
The current Erelu Kuti of Lagos is Oloye Abiola Dosunmu, a princess of that kingdom. A direct descendant of Oba Dosunmu, she has held the chieftaincy for more than forty years.

== See also ==
- Iyalode
- Iyoba
- Queen mothers in Africa
- Erelu
