= Rilwan Akiolu =

Oba of Lagos, Nigeria (r. 2003–present)

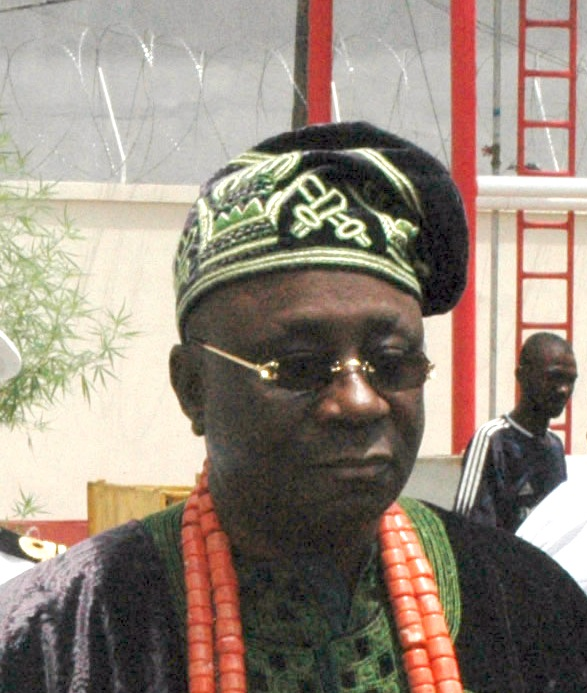
- Rilwan Akiolu in 2006

Oba of Lagos
- Reign: 24 May 2003 – present
- Coronation: 9 August 2003
- Predecessor: Adeyinka Oyekan
- Born: Rilwan Babatunde Osuolale Aremu Akiolu; 29 October 1943 (age 82); Lagos, British Nigeria
- Religion: Islam

Rilwan Babatunde Osuolale Aremu Akiolu (born 29 October 1943) is the incumbent Oba of Lagos.

== Career ==
After high school he served for 32 years in the Nigeria Police Force, entering the force in 1970. He served in various capacities, was promoted to assistant inspector-general of Police in 1999, and was active until his retirement in 2002. He is a member of the Nigerian Institute of Management and a fellow of the Nigerian Law School.

== Coronation ==
On 23 May 2003, Akiolu was selected by the kingmakers of the Lagos traditional kingdom and confirmed by the Lagos State government as the 21st Oba of Lagos; he was capped the next day, and was crowned on 9 August 2003. He has served in this position since May 2003, when he succeeded Oba Adeyinka Oyekan.

The Akinsemoyin Royal Family of Lagos has challenged Oba Akiolu's coronation in court, complaining, amongst others, that their lineage has been denied access to the throne.

== Controversy ==
=== Hate speech and incitement to violence against lgbo community ===
Akiolu courted controversy when in April 2015 in a meeting with Igbo leaders in Lagos he publicly swore "by the grace of Almighty Allah, that any of the Igbo representatives who went against his will that Ambode insha'Allah would be the next governor of Lagos, the person is going to die inside this (Lagos Lagoon) water".

=== Invasion of Palace ===
==== Supposed Covid-19 Palliatives ====
On Thursday 22 October 2020, during the #EndSars protest crisis, videos circulated on social media and some News channels of protesters venturing the Oba’s Palace where they discovered a large warehouse in which he had hidden Government distributed Covid-19 Palliatives meant for the people of his community. Amongst the items recovered included; thousands of bags of rice, cartons of noodles, food condiments and essential household items. On the same day, his staff of authority was taken away by aggrieved youths who invaded his Palace. The Ruling House in Lagos ordered for the Staff of authority to be returned in order to restore decorum and regard to the throne. The staff was later recovered.

==== Illegal amounts of cash ====
Months after the invasion of the Palace, Akiolu claimed that building and vehicles were burnt while $2 million and ₦17 million were stolen. This statement prompted calls for his arrest and prosecution by the EFCC as the Money Laundering (Prohibition) Act of 2011 prohibits holding such large amounts of cash. Some Lagos lawyers called for Akiolu to explain the reason for holding the money at the palace while a human rights lawyer, Festus Ogun claimed that the Money Laundering Act is unconstitutional. Others asked how Akiolu obtained the large amount of cash, as he had been a police officer prior to becoming Oba.
