= Oba of Lagos =

Ceremonial sovereign of Lagos, Nigeria

Incumbent
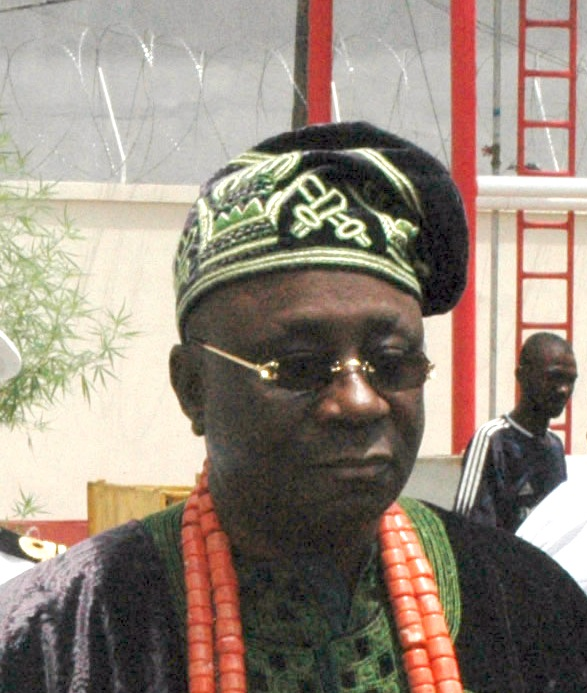
- Rilwan Akiolu
- (since 24 May 2003)

Details
- Style: His Majesty
- First monarch: Ado
- Formed: 1716
- Residence: Iga Idunganran

The Oba of Lagos, also known as the Eleko of Eko, is the traditional ruler (Oba) of Lagos.

The Oba is a ceremonial Yoruba sovereign with no political power, but is sought as a counsel or sponsor by politicians who seek support from the residents of Lagos, the financial heart of Nigeria and the largest city in Africa. The Oba has appeared in tourism advertisements on behalf of the city, often stating "You've gotta go to Lagos", among various other ceremonial roles.

The current Oba of Lagos is Rilwan Akiolu, who has held the title since 2003.

== History ==
All Obas of Lagos trace their lineage to Ashipa - an Awori, a war captain of the Oba of Benin. Ashipa was rewarded with the title of the Oloriogun (War leader) and he received the Oba of Benin's sanction to govern Lagos on his behalf. Ashipa received a sword and royal drum as symbols of his authority from the Oba of Benin on his mission to Lagos. Additionally, the Oba of Benin deployed a group of Benin officers charged with preserving Benin's interests in Lagos. These officers, led by Eletu Odibo, were the initial members of the Akarigbere class of Lagos White Cap Chiefs. Prior to the arrival of the British, the Oba of Benin had "the undisputed right to crown or confirm the individual whom the people of Lagos elect[ed] to be their King".

Tributes continue to flow the way of Benin from Lagos island for many years until around the year 1830 when Lagos stopped it. By this time, the status of Lagos as an independent power in its own right had risen tremendously and it had become too strong to be attacked. The King of Benin therefore had to be content with occasional gifts which were no longer given as obligatory tribute, but rather, as an act of historical sentiment.

The defeat of Oba Kosoko by British forces on 28 December 1851, in what is now known as the Bombardment of Lagos or Reduction of Lagos, or locally as Ogun Ahoyaya or Ogun Agidingbi (literally meaning "boiling cannons"), eventually put an end to all forms of tributary (sentimential or official) and Lagos' former allegiance to the Oba of Benin.

Kosoko was therefore the last Lagos Oba to engage in any form of sentimental gifting from the people of Lagos to the Oba of Benin. Oba Akitoye, who was re-installed to the throne by the British, "seized the opportunity of his restoration under British protection to repudiate his former allegiance" to Benin and rebuffed subsequent tribute requests from the Oba of Benin.

Previous rulers of Lagos have used the titles of Ologun (derived from Oloriogun), Eleko and, most recently, Oba of Lagos.

== The Royal Seat ==
The official residence of the king, since 1630, is Iga Idunganran, a castle renovated by the Portuguese over the course of close to a century. It is today a very popular tourist site.

== Obas and succession ==
- Ashipa (1600–1630) not crowned
- King Ado (1630–1669) first King of Lagos
- King Gabaro (1669–1704)
- King Akinsemoyin (1704–1749)
- King Ologun Kutere (1749–1775)
- Adele Ajosun (1775-1780 & 1832–1834)
- Eshilokun (1780–1819)
- Oba Idewu Ojulari (1819–1832)
- King Oluwole (1836–1841)
- King Akitoye (1841-1845 & 1851–1853)
- Oba Kosoko (1845–1851)
- King Dosunmu [Docemo] (1853–1885)
- Oba Oyekan I (1885–1900)
- Oba Eshugbayi Eleko (1901-1925 & 1932)
- Oba Ibikunle Akitoye (1925–1928)
- Oba Sanusi Olusi (1928–1931)
- Oba Falolu Dosunmu (1932–1949)
- Oba Adeniji Adele (1949–1964)
- Oba Adeyinka Oyekan II (1965–2003)
- Oba Rilwan Akiolu (2003–present)

== See also ==
- Erelu Kuti
- Timeline of Lagos city
