= 2006 Lagos building collapses =

Lagos building collapses in 2006

Coordinates: 6.453°N 3.395°E

In 2006, three building collapses were reported in Lagos, Nigeria.

== March ==
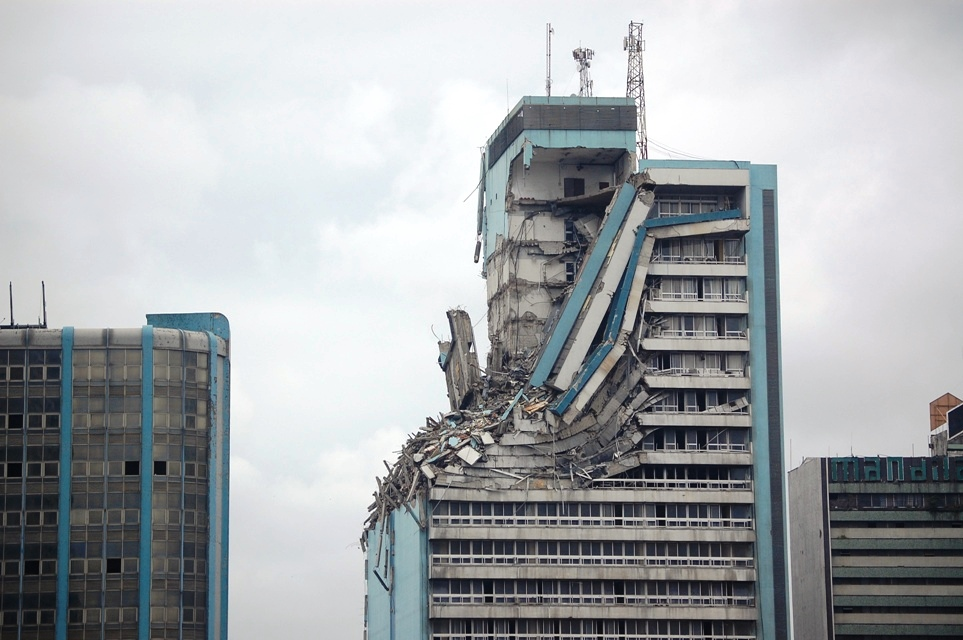
The Nigerian Industrial Development Bank building in 2007, the year after its partial collapse and the year before its implosion

On 22 March, about two thirds of each of the top nine stories of the 21-story Nigerian Industrial Development Bank building in Lagos, Nigeria collapsed. A fire had gutted two stories in the building earlier that month. Heavy winds during a thunderstorm caused the building to cave in from the structural weakness after the fire. This building was located in the commercial centre of the city. The building sat vacant and in ruins for the next two years until it was ultimately demolished on 21 September 2008, the first building to be imploded in Nigeria. It was replaced by a parking lot.

=== Casualties ===
One person was killed while 24 were reported injured.

== July ==
On 18 July 2006 a four-story block of flats collapsed in Lagos. At least 25 people were killed. It is thought the accident was caused by poor construction. The building was under three years old. The building was composed of 36 flats. Officials said that those responsible for the building's collapse would be prosecuted.

=== Rescue operations and casualties ===
Rescue operations were carried out by the Red Cross and local volunteers. Rain hampered efforts on the first night. Altogether 50 people were found alive.

== November ==
In November a three-story building still under construction collapsed. Two construction workers were killed.

=== Rescue operations and casualties ===
The Red Cross led rescue efforts. Twelve people were saved with only minor injuries. The first day of rescue efforts were slowed by the fact that no heavy equipment had been assigned for clearing refuse and looking for bodies.
