= Iga Idunganran =

Official Residence of the Oba of Lagos

Coordinates: 6.4654°N 3.3900°E

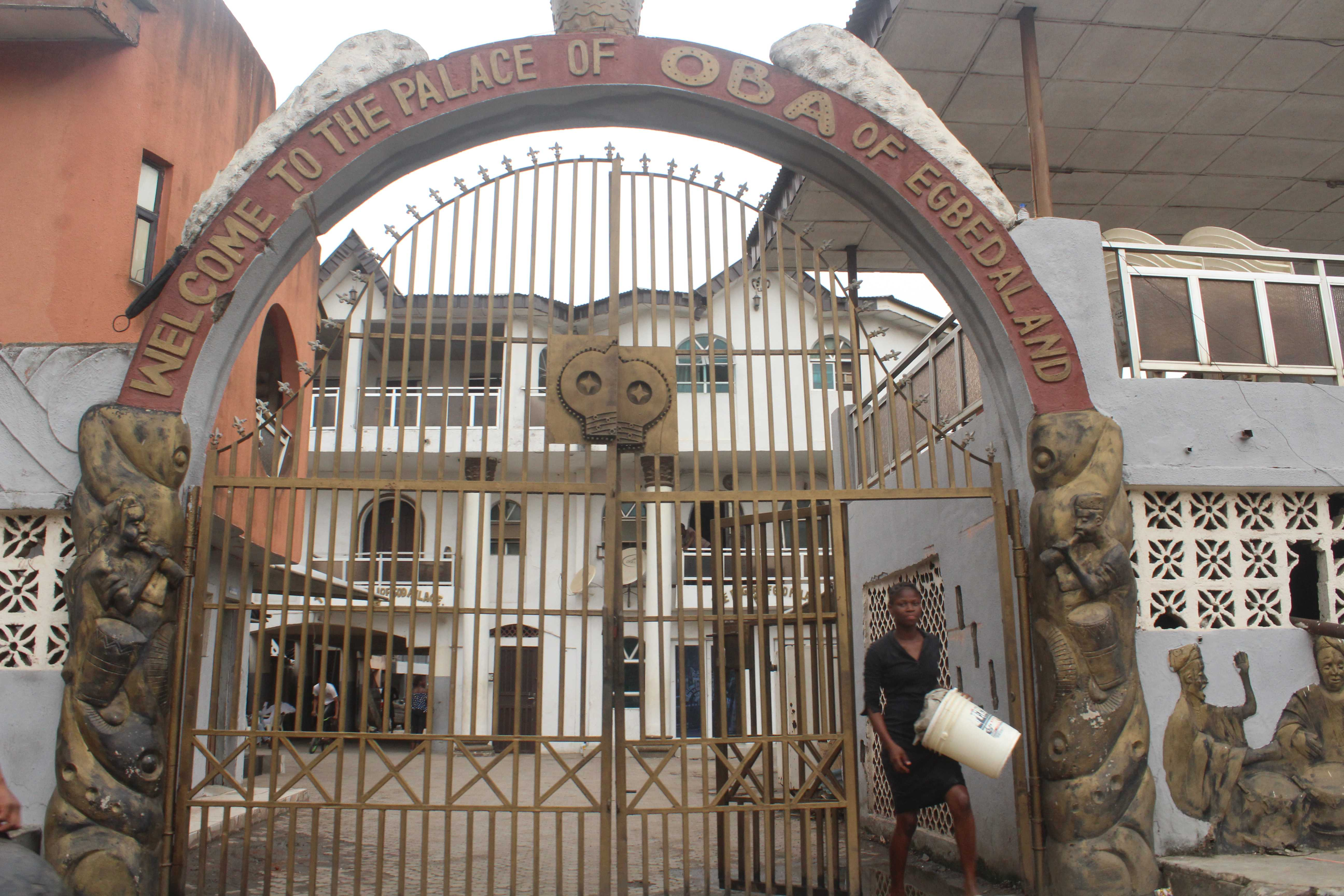
Entrance to the Oba palace

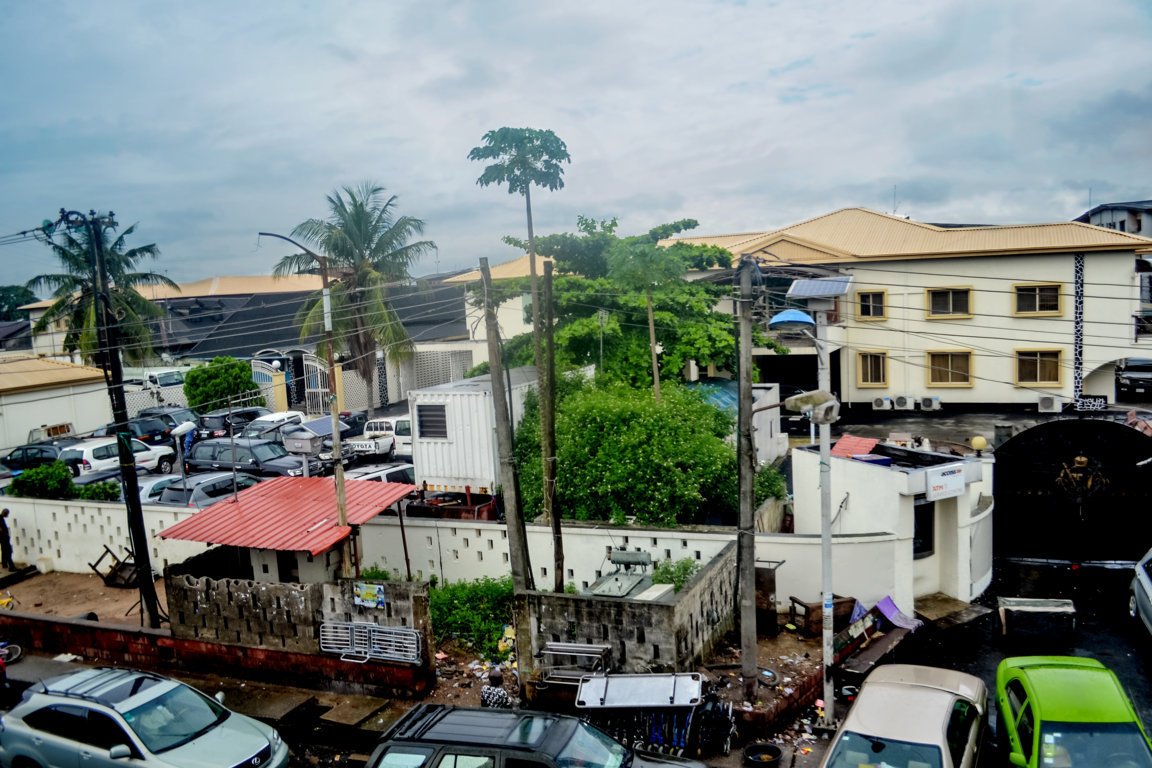
Iga Iduganran, Lagos Island

Iga Idunganran is the Official Residence of the Oba of Lagos, situated on Lagos Island, in Lagos, Nigeria.

== History ==
Dating back to the 15th century, the Lagos Island was originally owned by the island's first inhabitant Chief Aromire, an Ile-Ife nobleman, who used it as a fishing port and pepper farm. The ancient palace was initially built in 1670 for Oba Gabaro (1669-1760). It was later refurbished by the Portuguese, with materials — especially tiles — brought in from Portugal.

The modern part of the complex was completed and commissioned on 1 October 1960 by the Prime Minister of Nigeria, Sir Abubakar Tafawa Balewa. Recently modernized by the Obas Adeniji Adele II and Adeyinka Oyekan II, it underwent additional modernization in 2007 and 2008 by the present Oba, Akiolu, in conjunction with the Lagos State government and the Nigerian Museum.

Iga Idunganran has served as an administration centre, the island's market and the venue of the Eyo festival.

== Name derivation ==
IGA, derived from the Oyo/Ife Yoruba language GAA meaning Royal Home or Palace, IDUN means land, place or sound of while IGANRAN is the Yoruba word for pepper. Iga Idunganran therefore translates to "the palace built on a pepper farm", Aromire having used the land previously as his farm.

== The ancient tombs ==
All the Obas of Lagos before Oba Akitoye are buried in Benin City. Oba Akitoye was the first Oba of Lagos to be buried within the modern palace. All subsequent Obas except Sanusi Olusi and Kosoko are buried at Iga Idunganran.

== The ancient shrines of Iga Idunganran ==
A number of shrines to the orishas exist in the palace. These include:

=== Èṣù ===
Esu (pronounced Éshu) can be found at the exit gate of the Palace.. The Oba and his chiefs prayed at this shrine to ward off danger to Lagos (and later Nigeria generally) in times past. They also prayed there prior to leaving the palace for any private or official function to ward off evil. Moreover, before going out, the Oba is supposed to visit this shrine in order to be told how his journey will be. Questions such as whether the journey will be favourable and whether it is safe for the Oba to embark on such a journey would typically be asked.

=== Ògún ===
Ogun is the god of iron. Though not within the palace per se, there is a small edifice constructed for immediate access in the complex's grounds. The main shrine is situated outside the present walls of the palace, though it still falls under its jurisdiction. It has a priestess who handles its day-to-day running.

== Rites ==
Special rites and prayers are performed every sixteen days in the palace, usually by the Araba of Lagos, Chief Ajanaku, though the Oba does on occasion use other traditional priests and priestesses depending on the priority and the occasion, and the perceived spiritual prowess of such people. Some of the items necessary for performing these rituals are bitter kola, kola-nuts, alligator pepper, palm oil, schnapps or any plain gin, chickens, pigeons, goats or rams and anything else the Ifa oracle may decree, short of a human life.

== End SARS 2020 Attack ==
In the aftermath of the 2020 End SARS protests, Iga Idungaran was looted and the Oba of Lagos, Rilwan Akiolu accused the looters of carting away $2m and ₦17m from his palace.

== See also ==
- Presidential Lodge, former presidential palace in Lagos
