= History of Lagos =

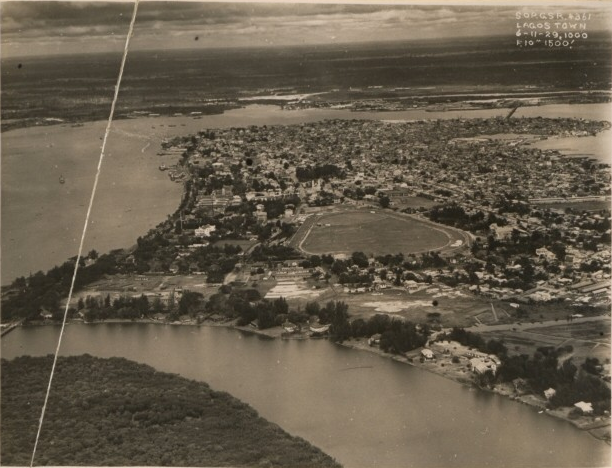
Aerial view of Lagos in 1929

As of 2023, Lagos is the largest city in the continent of Africa as well as in Nigeria, a country where it was the capital. In a 2022 report by Business Africa Insider, the city is the fourth wealthiest city in Africa after Johannesburg, Cape Town and Cairo.

Lagos was founded in the 16th-century by the Awori people on the Bight of Benin. Following the British ruling in the city in 1851, it became a protectorate in 1861.

== Historical names ==
The core of modern-day Lagos, Lagos Island was originally known as 'Oko' to the native Awori, a sub-group of the Yoruba people, and later as 'Eko' when it was under the administration of the Benin Kingdom. This name came from Ikurame, meaning 'war camp' in the Edo language. The Portuguese would refer to it as "Onim" and later "Lagos". To differentiate the modern settlement from the older kingdom in the area, the name "Onim" has been applied to the latter by some historians such as Toby Green.

Lagos means "lakes" in Portuguese. Portuguese explorer Rui de Sequeira visited the area in 1472, naming the area around the city Lago de Curamo, which means Lake of Curamo. It has also been suggested that the city was named after the Portuguese seaport of Lagos in the Algarve. Alfred Moloney considered this explanation more probable than derivation from the Portuguese word lago ("lake"), and Sir Alan Burns likewise stated that the Portuguese named the settlement after the city of Lagos in southern Portugal.

== Beginnings ==
=== Foundation Legend ===
Lagos was originally inhabited by the Awori subgroup of the Yoruba people. Awori legend has it that their ruler Olofin was given a mud plate by Oduduwa, with the instructions to place it in the river and settle wherever it sank to the bottom. After drifting down the river, it eventually sank in Lagos lagoon. Olofin divided the island among his ten sons. One of them, Aromire, planted pepper on the nearby island of Lagos. The palace of the Oba (king) of the Yoruba, Iga Idunganran, which was later built on this site, is therefore literally translated as "pepper farm palace".

=== Early history ===
The earliest people inhabiting the lagoon were fishermen. The Awori arrived by the 15th century, coming down the Ogun river seeking shelter from a war. The origins of Eko lay at Isheri, on the lower banks of the Ogun, where Ogunfunminire of Ife became the first king. As trade across the lagoon increased, the center of gravity shifted first to Ebute-Metta, then Iddo, and finally to Eko island. Those who crossed the lagoon to farm Lagos Island remained under the political umbrella of the Olofin, king of Iddo.

Trade drew numerous groups to the area, including the Ijebu in the 15th century, and Binis in the 16th century. The Portuguese began trading in the lagoon circa 1472 but bypassed the small island communities, going directly to Ijebu.

== Under Benin ==
By the mid-16th century, the Kingdom of Benin was taking an increasing role of European trade, and expanding west to control more coastal access points and cloth production centers. Around 1600, a dispute broke out between the Beninese and other foreign merchants on one hand and the local Awori on the other. This became an opportunity for Benin to exert its influence. Oba Orhogbua attacked Iddo, but was beaten back by the Olofin and the Awori. Eventually the Benin armies were victorious (according to their traditions), or a military stalemate ended in a negotiated settlement (according to the Awori). Lagos Island became a fortified Benin military post, with the commander Asheru exerting significant influence in the region, particularly among non-Awori merchants.

The conflict continued, however, and Asheru was killed during a raid on Isheri. An Awori chief named Ashipa, eager to secure his position and the favour of the growing power of the King of Benin, returned the commander's remains to Benin city. The Oba of Benin appointed him as ruler of Eko. Beninese traditions, however, remember Ashipa as a son or grandson of Oba Orhogbua. It is likely that Ashipa was an Awori prince involved in a power struggle who allied himself with foreign merchants and, ultimately, imperial Benin in order to secure his succession. He founded a new royal dynasty which would in time take the title Oba as well, with Edo leaders founding the lineages that would serve as military and administrative chiefs of the new kingdom. Ashipa initiated a payment of tribute that would not be abolished until 1830, although Eko's subservience to Benin was mostly nominal by the 18th century.

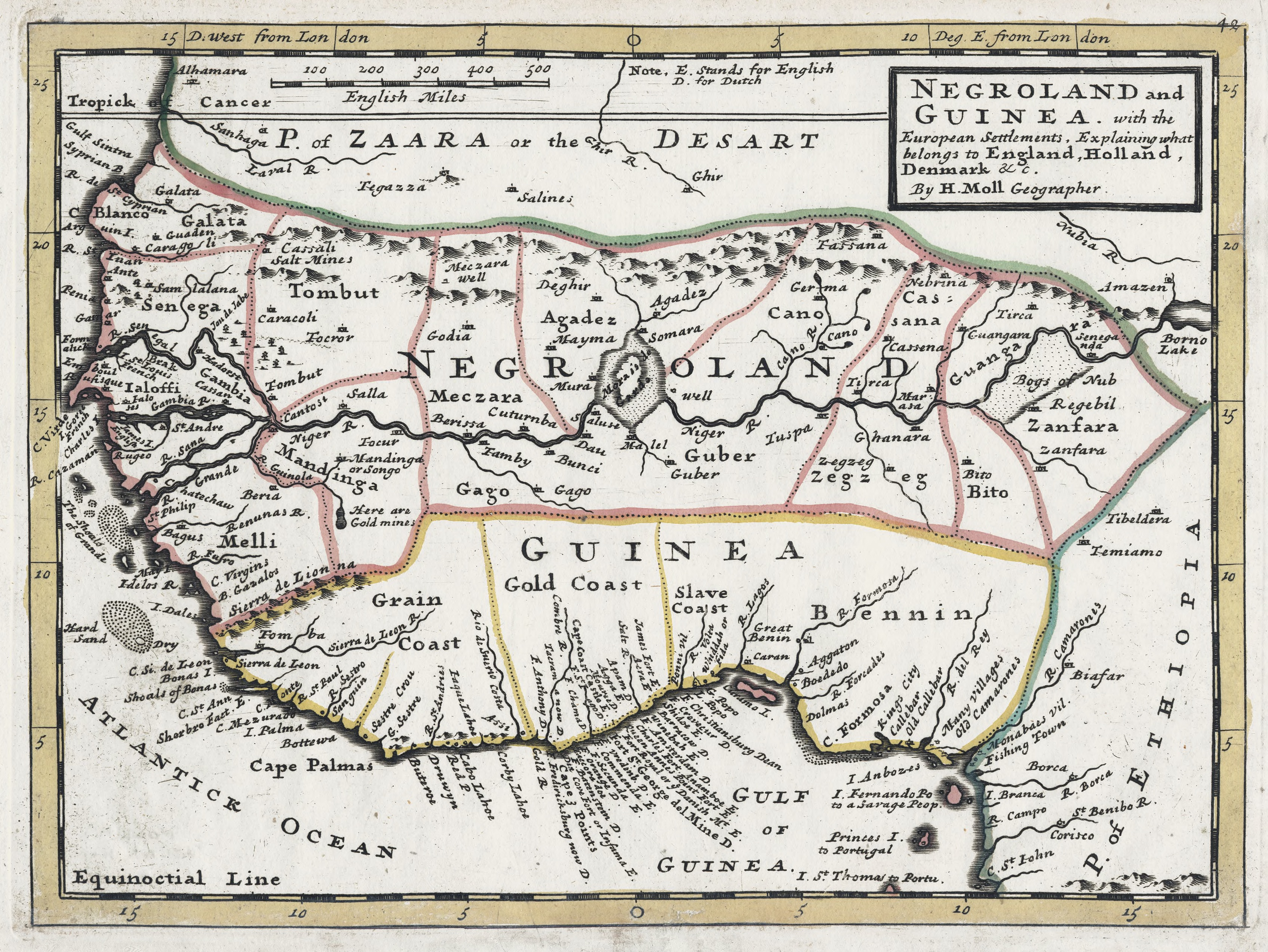
Map of West Africa by Herman Moll, 1727

== Commercial Growth and Political Instability ==
=== Major Slaving Port ===
The Beninese military presence as well as exchange with European traders resulted in economic growth, as locals would travel along the coast and from further inland to Lagos Island for trade; at this point, cloth was the main item sold at and exported from the island as well as Benin as a whole. In the 17th century, the trade with the Portuguese also began to increase, as Onim became a center of the Atlantic slave trade. The local obas (kings) developed good relations with the Portuguese. 1652 saw the first recorded purchase of slaves at Lagos by English slavers.

It was not until the 1760s, however, that Lagos became an important port in the slave trade. According to tradition, a dispute with his brother Gabaro had driven prince Akinsemoyin into exile in Badagry. There, he made contacts among the European slave-traders. When Akinsemoyin took the throne of Eko in the 1760s, he opened his new kingdom to the slave trade. The trade grew prodigiously in the 1780s, and then further with Dahomey's wars against Porto-Novo and the chaotic collapse of the Oyo Empire in the early 19th century. By then, Eko was the largest slave exporter in the northern hemisphere. Like many West African states, it developed strong diplomatic as well as economic links to South America. It sent embassies to the Portuguese colony of Brazil, and became one of the first countries to recognize the independence of Brazil in 1823.

=== Succession Disputes ===
Akinsemoyin died circa 1775. He was briefly succeeded by Eletu Kekere, and then by Ologun Kutere around 1780. His death in turn, around the dawn of the 19th century, led to a succession dispute between two of his sons, Osinlokun and Adele Ajosun. Both local traditions and contemporary European accounts identify Osinlokun as the elder and therefore the rightful heir but Adele was crowned instead, because he was his father's favorite or perhaps because Osinlokun was more interested in commerce than ruling. Adele proved to be less pliable than his older brother expected, however, and his ritual innovations and allowance of Islam into the kingdom sparked opposition among the chiefs. Civil war broke out, and Adele and his supporters were driven into exile in Badagry. He continued to raid Lagos from 1821 to 1835, but was unable to regain his throne.

Upon Osinlokun's death in 1829, his son Idewu Ojulari succeeded him. His avarice, perhaps tied to a downturn in the slave trade, gradually rendered him unpopular, however. The chiefs communicated their displeasure to the Oba of Benin, still the nominal overlord, who sent Idewu a skull, a sword, and a message that "the people of Lagos would no longer recognize him as their King." Interpreting the skull as an invitation to take poison, and the sword as a threat, he committed suicide.

Idewu Ojulari's brother Kosoko was blocked from succeeding his brother by the Eletu Odibo, the head of the àkárìgbèrè class of officeholders, who oversaw the selection and installation of obas. Their protracted feud would have profound consequences for the history of Eko. Adele Ajosun was invited back to the throne, but died two years later.

The Eletu Odibo once again blocked Kosoko from the throne, and Adele's son Oluwole was crowned. When Kosoko's wealthy and powerful sister Opo Olu was banished on trumped-up charges of witchcraft, Kosoko, Osinlokun's other children, and their followers declared war on Oluwole and the Eletu Odibo. They were defeated, however, and fled to Ouidah. Soon afterwards, Oluwole was killed when lightning set off the gunpowder supply in the palace. The new king Akitoye, son of Ologun Kuture, tried to restore unity and order by inviting his nephew Kosoko home and bestowing various titles and privileges on him. He was unable to enforce peace between Kosoko and the Eletu Odibo, who went into voluntary exile in Badagry. Akitoye persuaded him to return and allied with the Egba people as tensions escalated. Kosoko in turn looked to Dahomey and Ijebu for support.

When the civil war broke out in July 1845, Kosoko's forces surrounded the royal palace and besieging it for three weeks. The beleaguered defenders were forced to drink salt water, and the battle was remembered as the Ogun Olomiro (Salt Water War). Akitoye escaped to Abeokuta and then Badagry, but the Eletu Odibo was captured and drowned in the lagoon.

=== British Influence ===
In Britain's early 19th-century fight against the transatlantic slave trade, its West Africa Squadron or Preventative Squadron as it was also known, continued to pursue Portuguese, American, French, and Cuban slave ships and to impose anti-slavery treaties with West African coastal chiefs with so much doggedness that they created a strong presence along the West African coast from Sierra Leone all the way to the Niger Delta (today's Nigeria) and as far south as Congo. In 1849, Britain appointed John Beecroft Consul of the Bights of Benin and Biafra, a position he held (along with his governorship of Fernando Po) until his death in 1854. John Duncan was appointed Vice Consul and was located at Whydah.

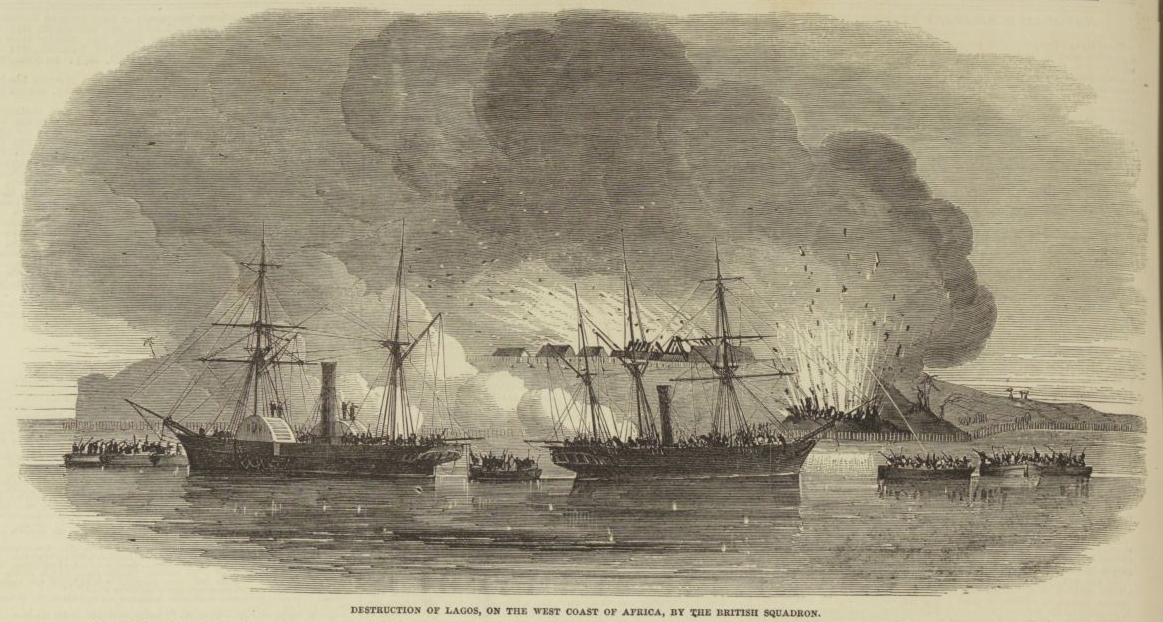
Newspaper illustration from 1852, showing the reduction of Lagos by British forces.

When Akitoye arrived in Badagry, he made contacts with Beecroft, Duncan, and local British missionaries. Seeing an opportunity to promote their interests in Lagos (where Portuguese and Brazilian merchants tended to dominate), the British agreed to help him regain his throne. In 1851, under pressure from liberated slaves who now wielded political and business influence, Britain intervened in Lagos in what is now known as the Bombardment of Lagos or Capture of Lagos resulting in the installation of Oba Akitoye and the ouster of Oba Kosoko. Oba Akitoye then signed the Treaty between Great Britain and Lagos abolishing slavery. The signing of the 1852 treaty ushered in the Consular Period in Lagos's history wherein Britain provided military protection for Lagos.

The Royal Navy originally used the port of the Spanish island of Fernando Po (now Bioko, Equatorial Guinea) off Nigeria as an extraterritorial base of operations. In 1855, Spain claimed this port for itself. The Royal Navy therefore had to find another naval base. Lagos was the most attractive option.

== Colonial Lagos ==
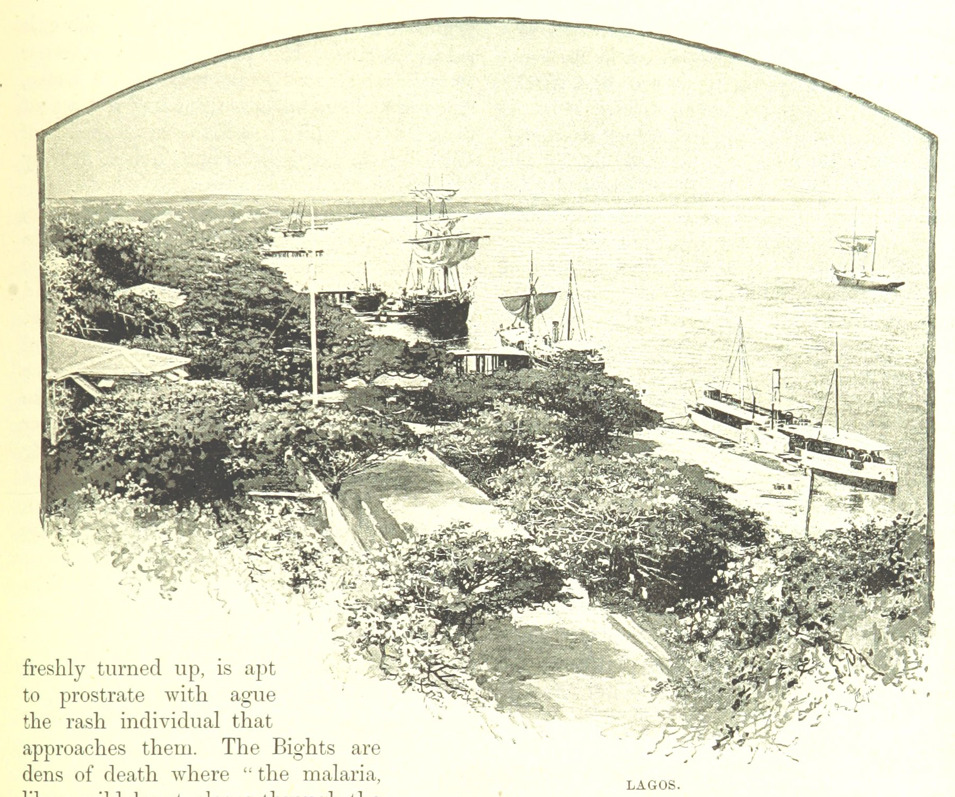
Lagos Marina 1892

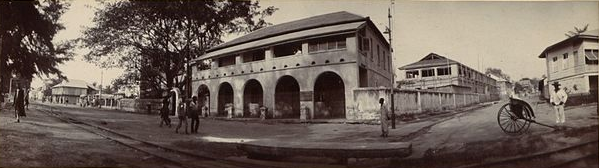
Street in Lagos, c. 1910

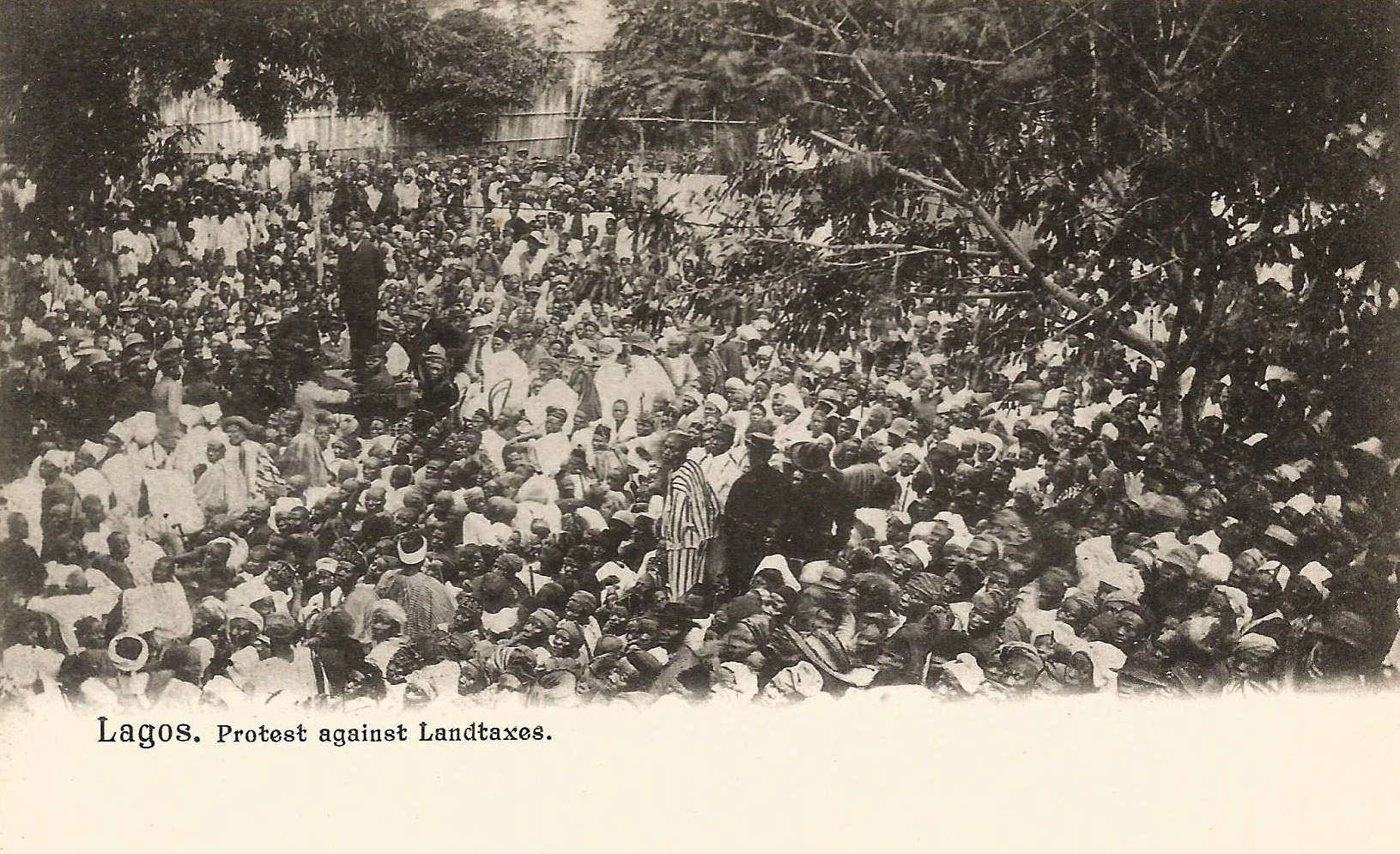
Lagos saw protest regarding house and land tax in 1895

Following threats from Kosoko and the French who were positioned at Whydah, a decision was made by Lord Palmerston (British Prime Minister) who noted in 1861, "the expediency of losing no time in assuming the formal Protectorate of Lagos". William McCoskry, the Acting Consul in Lagos with Commander Bedingfield convened a meeting with Oba Dosunmu on 30 July 1861 aboard HMS Prometheus where Britain's intent was explained and a response to the terms were required by August 1861. Dosunmu resisted the terms of the treaty but under the threat to unleash a bombardment on Lagos by Commander Bedingfield, Dosunmu relented and signed the Lagos Treaty of Cession on 6 August 1861.

=== Lagos as colony ===
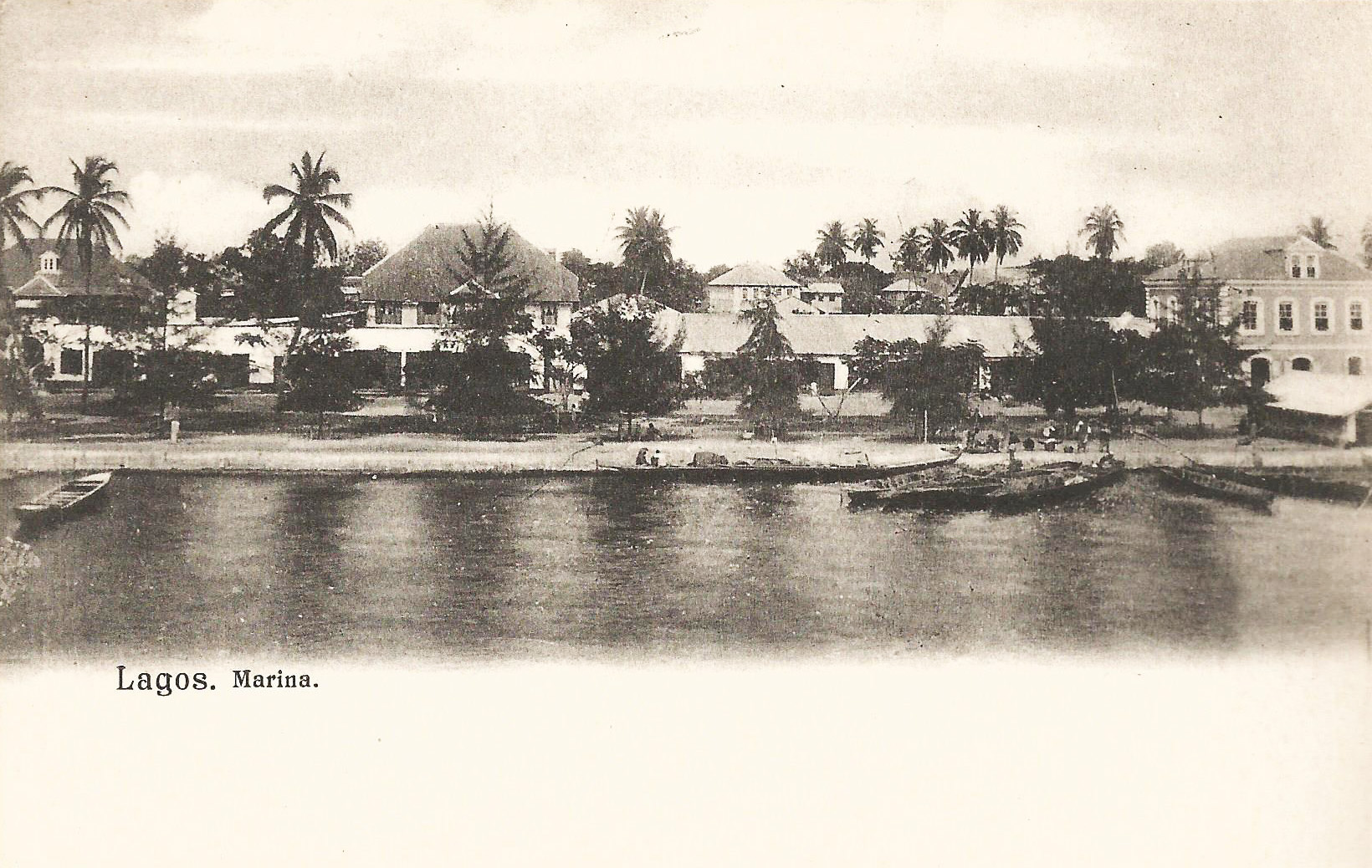
Lagos Marina (around 1900)

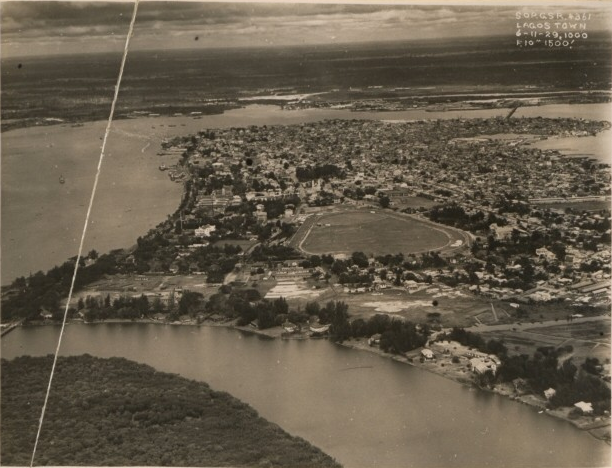
Aerial view of Lagos in 1929

Lagos was declared a colony on 5 March 1862 but governed by the Gold Coast, modern day Ghana. In 1886, Lagos became a separate colony from the Gold Coast under Governor Cornelius Alfred Moloney. Navy port Lagos became an essential trading centre as traders realised they could count on the protection of the Royal Navy to protect them from pirates, for example.

Lagos quickly became a destination for immigration. Along with migrants from all over Nigeria and other West African nations were the returnee ex-slaves known as Saro, who came from Freetown, Sierra Leone, and Aguda/Amaro who came from Brazil and Cuba to Lagos. The Aguda's and Saro's contributed to Lagos's modernisation and their knowledge of Portuguese architecture can still be seen from the architecture on Lagos Island.Since the 19th century, Lagos gradually transformed into a cosmopolitan melting pot of Africans and Latin Americans.

In 1869, the Cathedral Church of Christ was established in Lagos. Five years earlier, Samuel Ajayi Crowther had become the first African bishop of the Anglican Church.

=== Lagos as capital ===
The central importance of Lagos for Nigeria can be traced back to General Lugard, who advanced far north with British troops after 1900 and, as governor, made Lagos the capital of the south and later of the entire country.

In 1906, Lagos was merged with the Protectorate of Southern Nigeria and became its capital. In Lekki, near Lagos, the Nigerian Bitumen Corporation under businessman John Simon Bergheim found oil during test drilling in 1908.

On January 1, 1914, Northern Nigeria and Southern Nigeria were united into a single state, the "Colony and Protectorate of Nigeria"; Lagos became the capital. However, the British ruled northern and southern Nigeria in different ways, which continues to have an impact to the present day. In the north, "indirect rule" was practised, which left the traditional, partly centuries-old ruling structures largely intact. In the south, like Lagos, the British ruled directly and tried to impart European achievements to the local inhabitants. This includes the "Nigerian Council" of the Clifford Constitution of 1922, a kind of parliament with 46 representatives among which four locals, including three from Lagos. Northern Nigerians were not represented.

=== Modernisation ===
The Lagos Government Railway began construction of a Cape Gauge railway line from Lagos to Ibadan in 1896, which was opened on 4 March 1901. The line was later extended to Nguru via Oshogbo, Ilorin, Kaduna, Zaria and Kano, making a total length of about 1360 km. From 1902, the LGR also operated the Lagos steam tramway.

Telegraph cables connecting Lagos to London had been established by 1886.

Electrification was implemented in Lagos on 19 September 1898, 17 years after its introduction in England. The total generation at that time was 60 kilowatts (kW). The power line supplied the Lagos marina from the Government House to the north side of the island.

In 1901, the first bridge was built between Lagos Island and the mainland, the Carter Bridge, named after the governor from 1891 to 1898.

In 1913, the Lagos Port was commissioned.

=== Epidemic ===
The outbreak of bubonic plague was a milestone in the history of Lagos. The epidemic, which began in 1924 and lasted until 1931, was the cause of a total of 1,947 cases and 1,813 deaths, corresponding to a mortality rate of 94.02%.

=== Mailboat connection, "Boat Express" ===
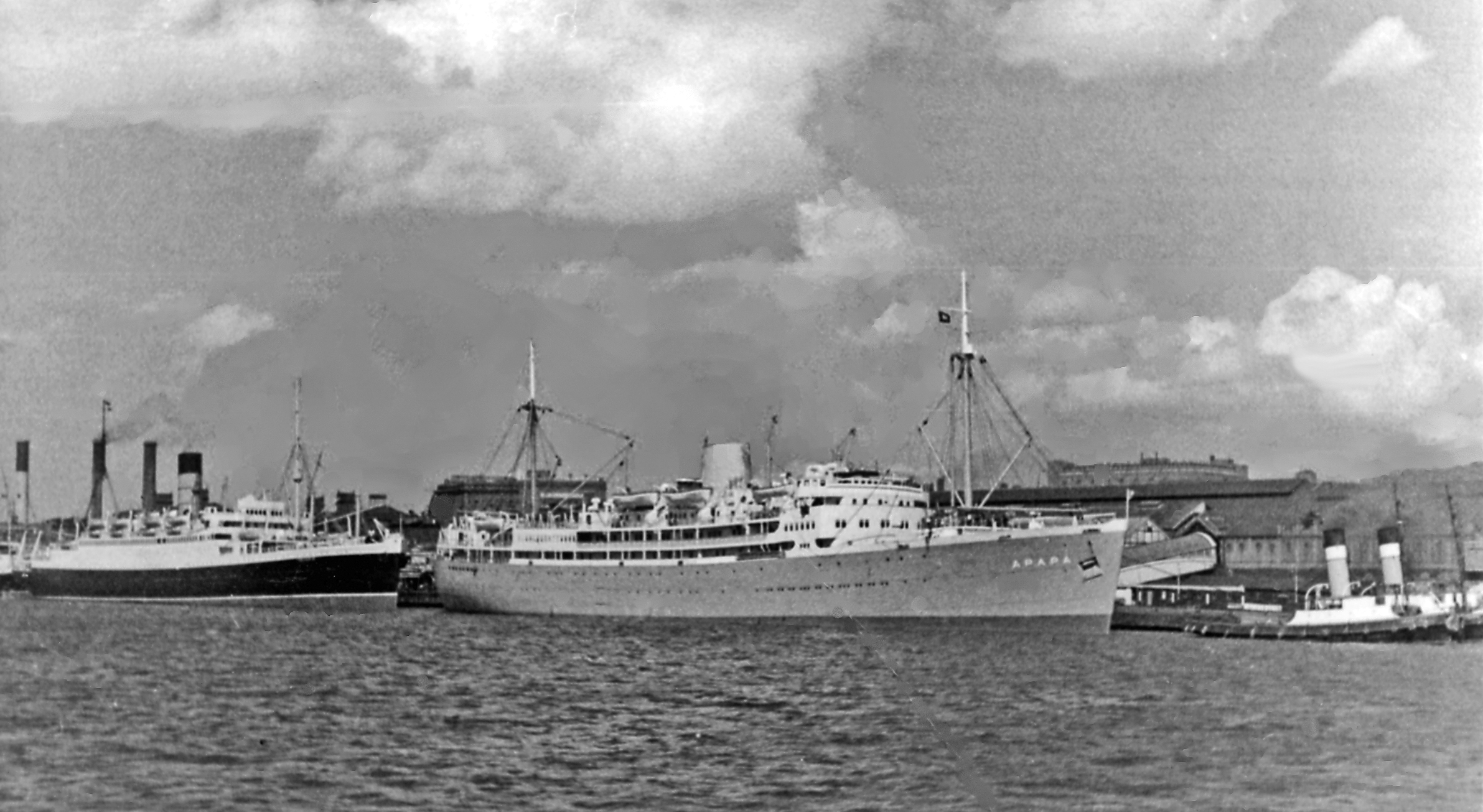
Mail steamer MS Apapa in route service between Liverpool and Lagos/Calabar/Fernando Po (picture from 1950)

Since 1 February 1914, a regular mailboat service ran between Lagos and Great Britain (Liverpool). The first mail steamer of this line was the S/S Akoko. The contact of the colony of Nigeria with Great Britain was mainly maintained by such mail ships before the beginning of air transport (1945). Once a month, a mail steamer of the Elder Dempster Lines from Liverpool docked in the capital Lagos/Apapa and in Calabar/Port Harcourt. These were alternately the MS Apapa and her sister ship, the MS Accra. In addition to letters and parcels, they also carried cargo and about 100 passengers and also stopped in Gambia, Sierra Leone, Liberia and the Gold Coast (Ghana). This was how colonial officials, colonial army officers, business travellers and globetrotters reached the West African colonies of the Commonwealth or home. Travellers from mail steamers could board the "Boat Express" waiting next to the steamer and reach Kano in far northern Nigeria within 43 hours in sleeping and dining cars. Such passengers were predominantly the officers of the colonial army in the first class compartment. In 1935, the railway network in colonial Nigeria reached its maximum expansion. It comprised 3,056 km of track at that time. In 1916, a 550 m railway bridge over the Niger River and in 1932 (or 1934) a bridge over the Benue River had connected the three parts of the rail network. 179 mainline and 54 shunting locomotives were in use. The maintenance and repair workshop in Ebute Metta employed 1,500 locals. High school graduates could be trained by the railway company as locomotive drivers or technicians in six-year courses - during which they worked in the workshop mentioned above and in the construction department, for example. During this training, the apprentices were paid and received an annual salary of £480 (about £48,000 in today's money, significantly more than the average Nigerian income today) upon completion of the training. For the trainees in Lagos, the railway company had specially provided a discarded but still functioning steam locomotive, which they could use to learn how it worked.

=== Second World War ===
In 1942, British special agents who were posted on the Spanish controlled island of Bioko used the ports in Lagos to house Italian and German supply ships which had been captured as part of "Operation Postmaster". The incident almost led to Franco's Spain entering the war alongside the Third Reich and fascist Italy.

In June 1945, railway workers in Lagos initiated a nationwide general strike. It was the first of its kind in the nation, growing to comprise 200,000 workers and seventeen labor unions. In 1946, the commission increased wages of workers. The strike served as a focal point for criticism of British rule of Nigeria. It has been cited as a "turning point" in Nigerian labor relations. An article on the strike in the Journal of the Historical Society of Nigeria declared its main legacy to be "the need for mutual sobriety." Nigeria did not have another general strike for nineteen years.

=== Orange Order ===
The Orange Order established its first lodge in Africa, known as the Lagos Fine Blues Loyal Orange Lodge No 801, formed at the end of the 19th century. This was a key point for the Orange Order's beginning's in Africa, as it spread from to other West African countries.

== Independence ==
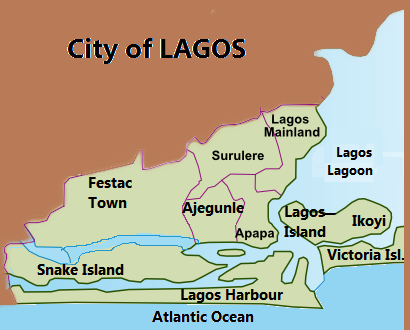
Map of Lagos' initial city boundaries, showing its contemporary districts. This definition is rarely used in the present day; the expanded metropolitan area is now a more accepted definition of Lagos.

Lagos maintained its status as capital when Nigeria obtained its independence from Britain in 1960. Lagos experienced rapid growth throughout the 1960s and 1970s as a result of Nigeria's economic boom. This continued through the 1980s and 1990s up to the present date.

=== Split into 13 LGA's ===
Modernist fountain of Tinubu Square, in an image from 1962

Before 27 May 1967, Lagos had been administered directly by the Federal Government as a Federal Territory through the Federal Ministry of Lagos Affairs, while the Lagos City Council (LCC) governed the city. Lagos, along with the towns from the then Western region (Ikeja, Agege, Mushin, Ikorodu, Epe and Badagry), were eventually merged to create Lagos State. Lagos city was split into the present day seven Local Government Areas (LGAs), while the other towns now make up 13 LGAs in the state. Lagos played the dual role of being the State and Federal Capital until 1976 when the state capital was moved to Ikeja. Lagos was adversely affected during Nigeria's military rule.

=== Music Industry, McCartney's "Band on the Run" ===
Lagos has been a centre of the music industry since the seventies. International stars like Beyoncé also record their hits in Lagos.

The pioneer in this respect was Paul McCartney, who recorded the album "Band on the Run" with his then band Wings at the EMI studio on 7 Wharf Road in Apapa, Lagos, from August to October 1973. Among other things, the ex-Beatle hoped for inspiration from the exotic location. "Band on the Run" is still (2023) McCartney's most successful album, which is also praised by critics.

=== The cement armada ===
One of the strangest chapters in the history of Lagos is that of the "cement armada". Due to corruption and incompetence of the central government under General Gowon, hundreds of ships with ordered cement deliveries - half of the world supply - were lying outside the port in 1974, causing chaotic scenes.

=== Volkswagen plant in Lagos ===
Volkswagen of Nigeria began assembling the VW 1300 in Lagos on 21 March 1975. In 1976, it produced over 16,000 vehicles, including the Passat and the Audi 100. In 1982, the Shagari government reacted to Nigeria's lack of foreign currency by imposing import restrictions, which hampered production in Lagos in the 1980s.

In March 1990, the Volkswagen Group decided to withdraw from the Nigeria business. Negotiations on a sale to a Nigerian group of companies, which began in 1992, failed to reach a conclusion because of internal political power struggles. In 1994, Volkswagen withdrew the last German employees. Since then, production has been at a standstill. The district where the production plant was located is still called "Volkswagen".

=== FESTAC 77 ===
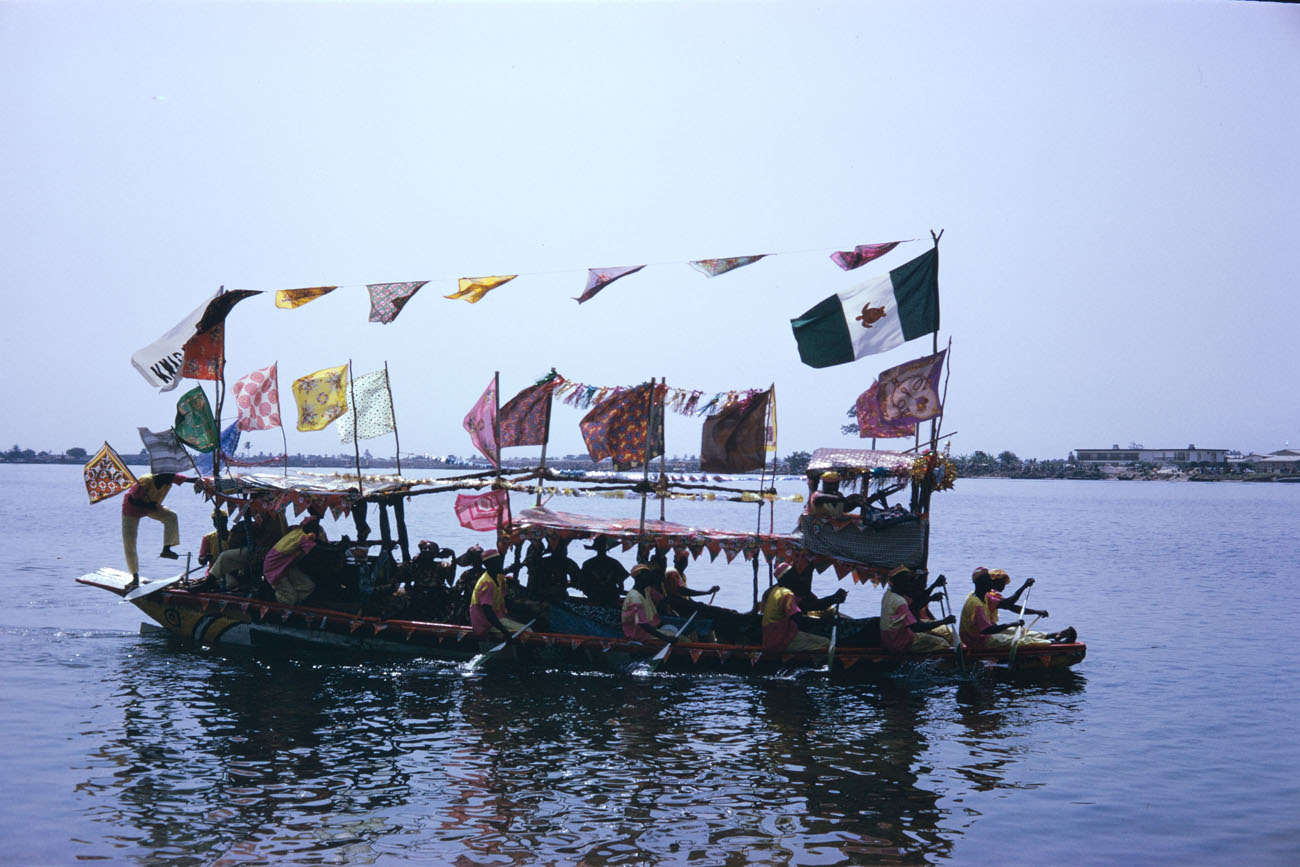
Regatta on the occasion of FESTAC 77 in Lagos 1977

From January to February 1977, the Second World Black and African Festival of Arts and Culture (FESTAC) took place in Lagos (and in Kaduna). FESTAC 77 is believed to be the largest cultural event held in Africa in the 20th century. It included events and exhibitions on African art, film, music, literature, dance and religion. The site on the Badagry Expressway in the west of the city is still called "Festac town" today.

=== Visit of Jimmy Carter ===
From 31 March to 3 April 1977, the then US President Jimmy Carter visited Lagos. To date, it is the only visit by a US president to the city (as of 2023).

=== Not Nigeria's capital anymore ===
In 1991, Ibrahim Babangida, the Military President and other government functions moved to the newly built capital Abuja. This was as a result of intelligence reports on the safety of his life and what was later to be termed his hidden agenda, which was the plan to turn himself into a civilian president. He finished what was started by the Murtala/Obasanjo regime. The change resulted in Lagos losing some prestige and economic leverage. However, Lagos remains the financial center of the country, and also grew to become the most populous conurbation in the country.

== New millennium ==
=== The rise of Nollywood ===
After 2000, the centre of the Nigerian film industry, commonly referred to as Nollywood, developed in the Surulere district. Lagos itself has since been the location and setting for many films. The 2016 film "Captain America: Civil War" contains a scene set in Lagos. The Spanish police series "La unidad" (2020 - 2023), the British drama "The Last Tree" (2019) and the US-Spanish drama "The Way, Chapter 2" with Martin Sheen (2023 still in development) also use Lagos as a filming location. The film "93 days" (2016) with Danny Glover is a somewhat melodramatic but fact-based account of the 2014 Ebola outbreak in Lagos and was filmed on original locations. Since the success of the Nigerian thriller "The Figurine", Nigerian film has increasingly focused on high-quality productions that are also commercially successful. This in turn has led to ever new records in box office takings in Nigeria (2009: "The Figurine", 2013: "Half of a Yellow Sun", 2016: "The Wedding Party").

=== Emergency situations ===
On 27 January 2002, explosions occurred at a barracks site in the city. According to military sources, the cause was the spread of a fire from a street market. It led to about 30 explosions in an ammunition depot, which affected adjacent buildings. People fled in panic. The disaster emanating from the ammunition depot cost at least a thousand lives. Many families were left homeless as their homes were destroyed. Impacts occurred within a seven-kilometre radius of the explosion site. Many children drowned in a sewer as they fled.

In 2012, 163 people were killed when a McDonnell Douglas MD-83 crashed into a local furniture works and printing press building.

On 1 November 2021, a 21-storey high-rise building under construction in the affluent Ikoyi district collapsed (full article here). 44 people were killed, including the owner and the construction manager who were investigating problems in the structure on site at the time of the collapse. According to witnesses, a pillar on the first floor showed cracks. The owner, Femi Osibona, demanded that the contractor replaced this pillar with a new, intact one and offered the construction workers breakfast for the extra work. Shortly afterwards, the building had collapsed. The building permit had only allowed 15 storeys and the original contractor had withdrawn from the project a year earlier because of the deliberate deviations from the building plan. For example, after two identical buildings were built in close proximity, a different concrete mix had been used. - The construction disaster is the largest of its kind in Lagos (as of 2023); multi-storey buildings often collapse in the metropolis of Lagos, but the number of storeys and fatalities are quite a bit lower than in the above case.

=== Narrow escape: Ebola in Lagos ===
On 20 July 2014, a traveller from Liberia infected with Ebola arrived at the airport in Lagos and was diagnosed after being admitted to a private hospital. This patient may have infected 72 people at the airport and hospital. The patient died on 25 July; as of 24 September, there were 19 laboratory-confirmed Ebola cases and one probable case in two states, with 894 contacts identified and followed up as part of the response. No new cases had emerged since 31 August, suggesting that the Ebola outbreak in Nigeria may be contained. The rapidly established Emergency Operations Centre, which used an Incident Management System (IMS) to coordinate response and consolidate decision-making, was instrumental in containing the outbreak in Nigeria at an early stage and avoiding a disaster scenario.

=== Tech Hub in Yaba, Zuckerberg visit ===
On 30 August 2016, Mark Zuckerberg visited tech startups in the Yaba district, in particular CcHUB and IT instructor Andela. During his surprise visit, Zuckerberg spoke to children who are learning programming languages during their summer holidays, among other things. In October 2017, Facebook established the first African SME Council in Nigeria to support small and medium-sized enterprises.

=== Infrastructure measures ===
On 10 June 2021, Lagos received a standard gauge railway link with Nigeria's third largest city, Ibadan, including a modern central station, Mobolaji Johnson. While other sub-Saharan African countries continue to use or decommission railway networks from the colonial era, Nigeria is expanding its rail network with Chinese assistance. In 2022, the Nigerian Railway Corporation reported profitable operation of the Lagos-Ibadan line despite restrictions due to COVID epidemic.

In January 2023, the new deep-sea port of Lekki was opened to relieve traffic at the more centrally located but congested and shallower ports of Apapa and Tin Can Island.

On 4 September 2023, the first section, the blue line, of the Lagos suburban railway went into operation.

On 14 February 2024, Governor Sanwo-Olu announced that the Red Line of the Lagos suburban railway between Agbado and Oyingbo would be inaugurated on 29 February 2024 in the presence of Nigerian President Tinubu.

=== Construction of a multi-purpose arena ===
On 24 February 2024, the foundation stone was laid on Victoria Island for a multi-purpose arena that will seat 12,000 and provide a suitable stage for the booming entertainment industry. Live Nation, Oak View Group LLC, Persianas Group and the Nigerian Sovereign Investment Authority (NSIA) formed a consortium to build the arena, which is expected to be completed in December 2025. The arena will host a range of activities from performances by international and Nigerian music icons to family entertainment, basketball matches, UFC fights, boxing matches, WWE shows and much more. The arena is set to become Africa's leading venue for live entertainment. It will host 200 events a year.

== See also ==
- Timeline of Lagos
- Oba of Lagos
