= Dosunmu =

Oba of Lagos
- Reign: 1853–1885
- Coronation: 1853
- Predecessor: Akitoye
- Successor: Oyekan I
- Born: c. 1823; Lagos
- Died: 1885 (aged 61–62); Lagos
- Burial: Lagos
- Father: Akitoye

Dosunmu (c. 1823 – 1885), referred to in British documents as Docemo, reigned as Oba of Lagos from 1853, when he succeeded his father Oba Akitoye, until his own death in 1885. He was forced to run away to Britain under the threat of force in August 1861.

== Accession ==
Dosunmu's accession to the throne broke with tradition in that he was appointed Oba by British Consul to Lagos Benjamin Campbell following Britain's intervention in Lagos affairs following the Reduction of Lagos in December 1851. Campbell had learned about Oba Akitoye's death on 2 September 1853 from CMS agent C.C. Gollmer but withheld this information from the paramount chiefs, instead inquiring from them who Akitoye's heir should be. In unison, the chiefs agreed that Dosunmu was the rightful heir and only then did Campbell relay the news of Akitoye's death to them. Campbell then informed Dosunmu about his accession to the Obaship followed by hasty accession ceremonies at the palace. The next day, Dosunmu was officially recognized as Oba of Lagos and received a 21-gun salute from the Royal Navy.

== Rivalry with Kosoko ==
Dosunmu inherited the "Kosoko" problem from his father (Akitoye) in that Kosoko had established an independent base in Epe with about 400 warriors (including Oshodi Tapa) and from where he destabilized Lagos with multiple attacks that came dangerously close to Akitoye. While Kosoko eventually signed The Treaty of Epe on 28 September 1854 with Consul Benjamin Campbell, agreeing not to make any claims to Lagos or to endanger commerce in Lagos. The treaty was a tactical success for Kosoko who got the British to recognize his state in Epe. In the big picture, however, the Lagos throne remained out of reach with Akitoye and Dosunmu's descendants firmly rooted.

The Kosoko-Akitoye/Dosunmu rivalry spilled over to the economic realm. Oba Dosunmu's supporters didn't fully appreciate the British presence in Lagos after annexation in 1861 while Kosoko's allies exploited the relationship. Furthermore, according to terms of an agreement reached with 1854, Dosunmu relinquished trading rights for custom duties, which he was later forced to relinquish according to terms of the 1861 Treaty for a pension of £1,000 annually. Consequently, the Oba's wealth declined while Kosoko and his allies, under no such trading restrictions, flourished.

Kosoko's camp comprised men such as Oshodi Tapa and Taiwo Olowo who entered trade enthusiastically with European firms. At the head of the Dosunmu economic faction was Chief Apena Ajasa who repeatedly clashed with Taiwo Olowo. When Kosoko died the colonial government estimated that his economic faction was the more powerful one with at least 20,000 followers.

== Ceding Lagos to Britain in 1861 under threat of force ==
Following threats from Kosoko and the French who were positioned at Wydah, a decision was made by Lord Palmerston (British Prime Minister) who noted "the expediency of losing no time in assuming the formal Protectorate of Lagos". William McCoskry, the Acting Consul in Lagos with Commander Bedingfield convened a meeting with Oba Dosunmu on 30 July 1861 aboard HMS Prometheus where Britain's intent was explained and a response to the terms were required by August 1861. Dosunmu resisted the terms of the treaty but under the threat to unleash violence on Lagos by Commander Bedingfield, Dosunmu relented and signed the Lagos Treaty of Cession.

== Clash with Governor Glover ==
Some French firms who had lost their trade concessions made overtures to Dosunmu, sensing his disgruntlement with the British presence in Lagos, promising him assistance for revolting against Governor John Hawley Glover. Glover put down the attempt, fined Dosunmu £50, and suspended his stipend for 4 months. Dosunmu was not pleased and felt Glover used Kosoko to spite him. Dosunmu's position was merited as Glover enjoyed a very close friendship with Kosoko allies such as Oshodi Tapa whom Glover consulted before pursuing public projects and Taiwo Olowo whom Glover had encouraged to pursue trading with the firm of Messrs G.L. Gaiser.

== Death and legacy ==
Dosunmu died in 1885 and was succeeded by his son Oba Oyekan I.

A prominent descendant of his is Oloye Abiola Dosunmu, the Erelu Kuti of Lagos.
