= Taiwo Olowo =

Politician

- Born: Daniel Conrad Taiwo "Olowo" circa 1781; Isheri, Lagos
- Died: 20 February 1901 (aged 119–120); Lagos, Lagos Colony
- Father: Chief Oluwole

Chief Daniel Conrad Taiwo (1781 – February 20, 1901), alias Taiwo Olowo (translated as "Taiwo the Rich man"), was a trader, arms dealer, slave owner, political power broker, philanthropist and community leader in Colonial Lagos.

== Early life ==
Taiwo Olowo was born in c. 1781 in Isheri, a residential community in Lagos. His father, Oluwole, was a high chief (Olofin) of his hometown, and he died in 1809. Olowo arrived in Lagos in 1848 and served as an indentured slave to one Ogunmade by Oba Osinlokun. His name suggests that he was the older of a set of twins.

== Political and business ascendancy in Colonial Lagos ==
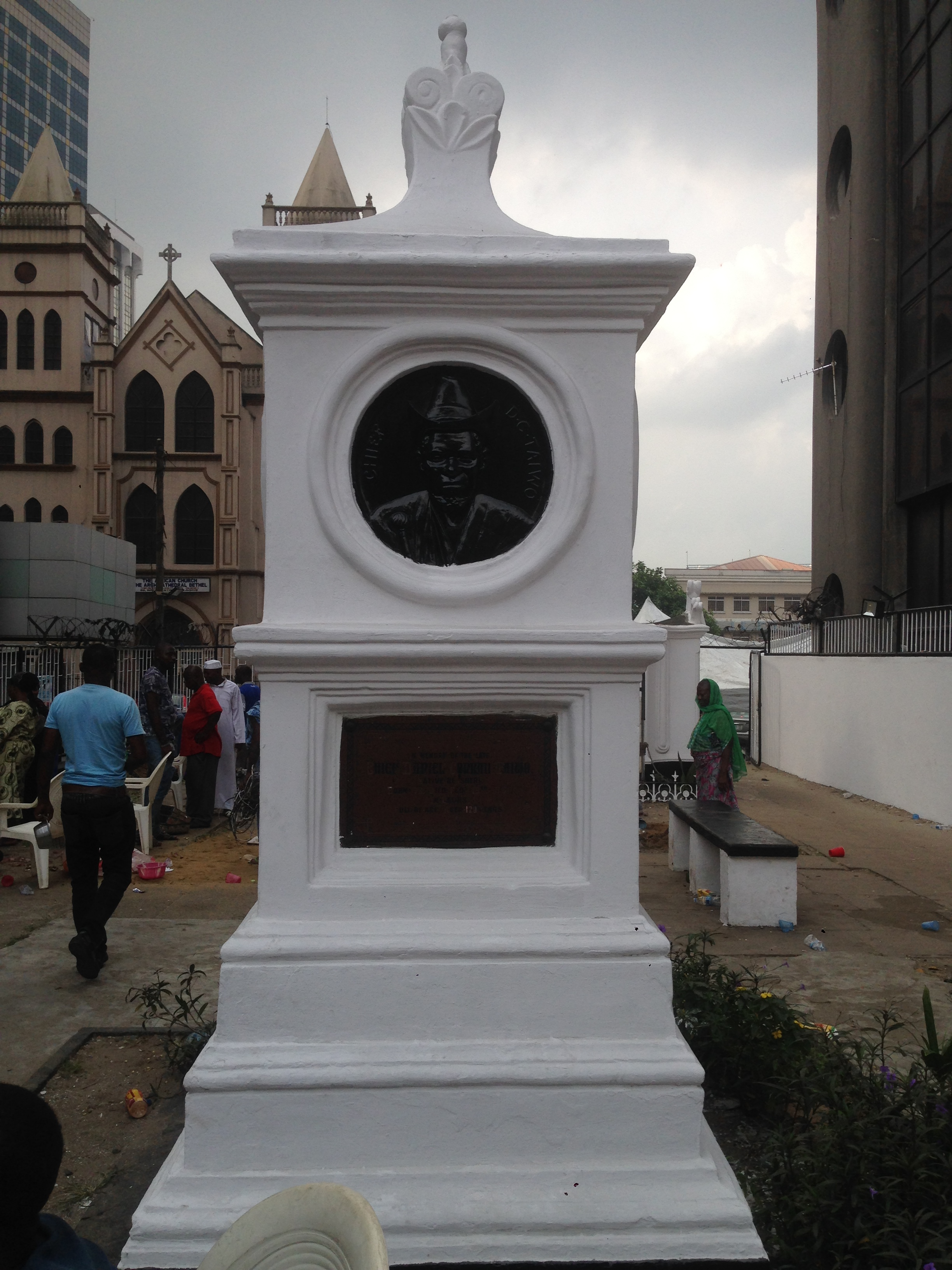
Taiwo Olowo's Cenotaph

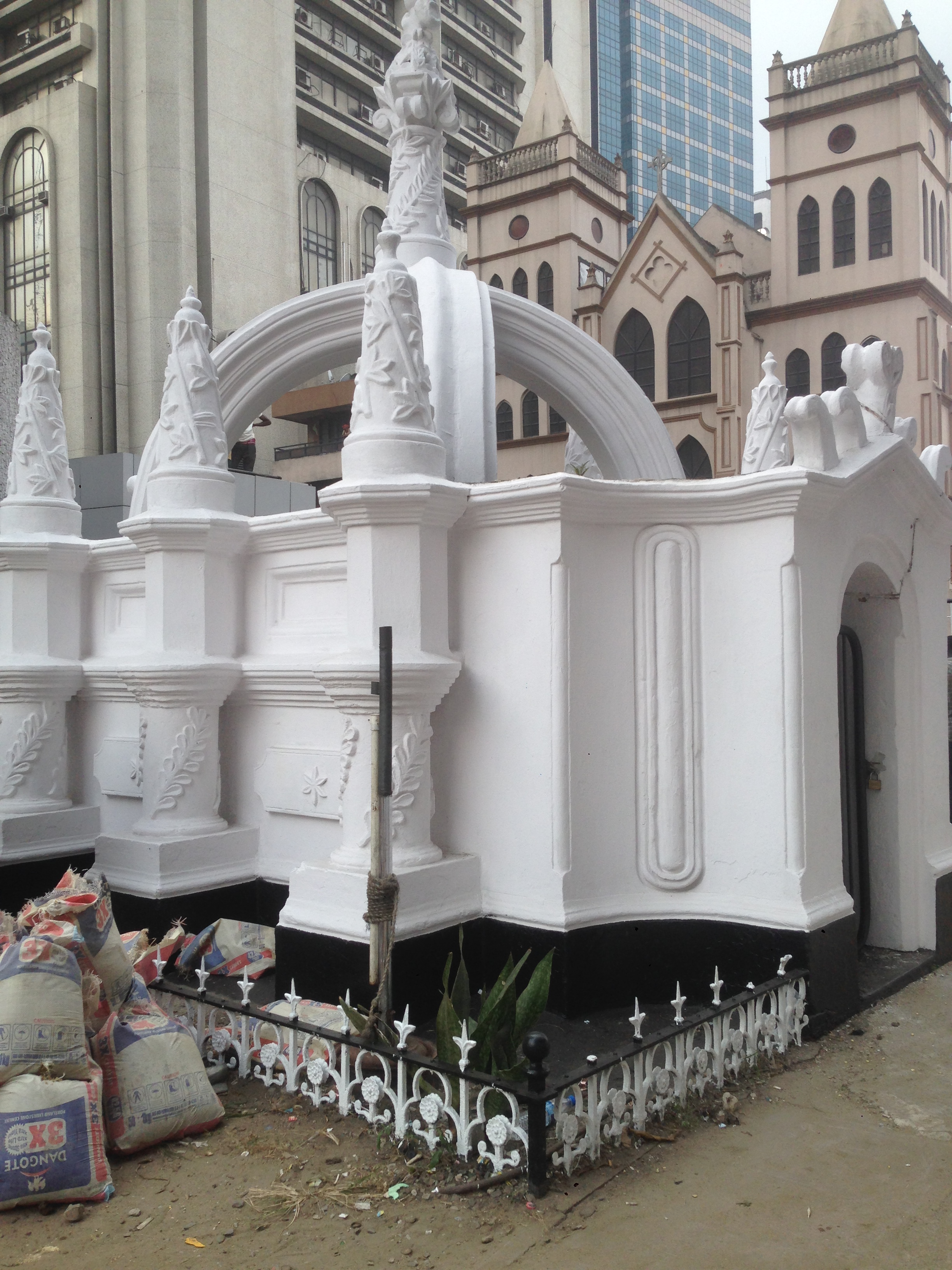
View of Taiwo Olowo's tomb

By the 1840s, Taiwo had become a protege of Kosoko, Oba Osinlokun's son. Kosoko reigned as Oba of Lagos from 1845 to 1853 and, as can be expected, Taiwo leveraged his closeness to Kosoko for mercantile gain, establishing partnerships with European and Brazilian merchants. While it is unclear whether Taiwo fled with Kosoko to Epe after the British Reduction of Lagos in December, 1851, and the subsequent installation of Oba Akitoye, what is known is that colonial Governor Freeman invited Kosoko back to Lagos in 1862. Taiwo built a mutually beneficial relationship with both Freeman's administration and successive ones.

In 1861, Kosoko introduced Taiwo to Governor Glover who took a liking to Taiwo and encouraged him to pursue trading. Governor Glover then established a political partnership that put Taiwo on the path to become one of the wealthiest and most powerful men in Lagos. Glover introduced Taiwo to the firm of Messrs G.L. Gaiser, who became Taiwo's main trading partners and who assisted him in the collection of debts owed Taiwo by Egba traders. Governor Glover also empowered Taiwo as the Baba Isale of Isheri. In his capacity as Baba Isale, Taiwo was a patron and representative of the Isheri people. In return, Taiwo enjoyed monopolistic privileges over all others in access to Isheri trade routes and markets.

In an 1865 letter to Colonel Ord, a British colonial official, Taiwo and other Lagosian merchants wrote that they had been "born slaves" and had "risen by [their] energies" to become successful slave owners, planters, canoe owners, and traders. The historian Kristin Mann notes that the exact dates of Taiwo Olowo's redefinition as a merchant and manumission from slavery are unknown.

Taiwo was baptized in the late 1870s at the Holy Trinity Church in Ebute Ero, taking the name Daniel Conrad Taiwo. He also served as an emissary of the British colonial government in Lagos, and was ambassador to the court of the King of Porto Novo.

When Oshodi Tapa, earlier war captain and now chief of business, died in 1868, Taiwo Olowo became Kosoko's business chief. Upon Kosoko's death in 1878, Taiwo became leader of the Kosoko economic faction (versus the smaller numbered Dosunmu faction headed by Oloye Apena Ajasa) of at least 20,000 followers. Taiwo feuded with the other powerful Baba Isale - Chief Ajasa - over trade routes and in other complex Lagos power plays. Ajasa was originally an ally of Oba Dosunmu, but the two fell out when Ajasa became too powerful for Dosunmu to handle. In an attempt to counterbalance Ajasa's political strength, Oba Dosunmu sided with Taiwo, contributing to Ajasa's political fall.

== Philanthropy ==
Taiwo and other former slaves contributed generously to the establishment of the first native pastorate church in Lagos, the Holy Trinity Church. He was also a benefactor of CMS Grammar School, Lagos, contributing £50 to the CMS Building Fund in 1867.

== Death and legacy ==
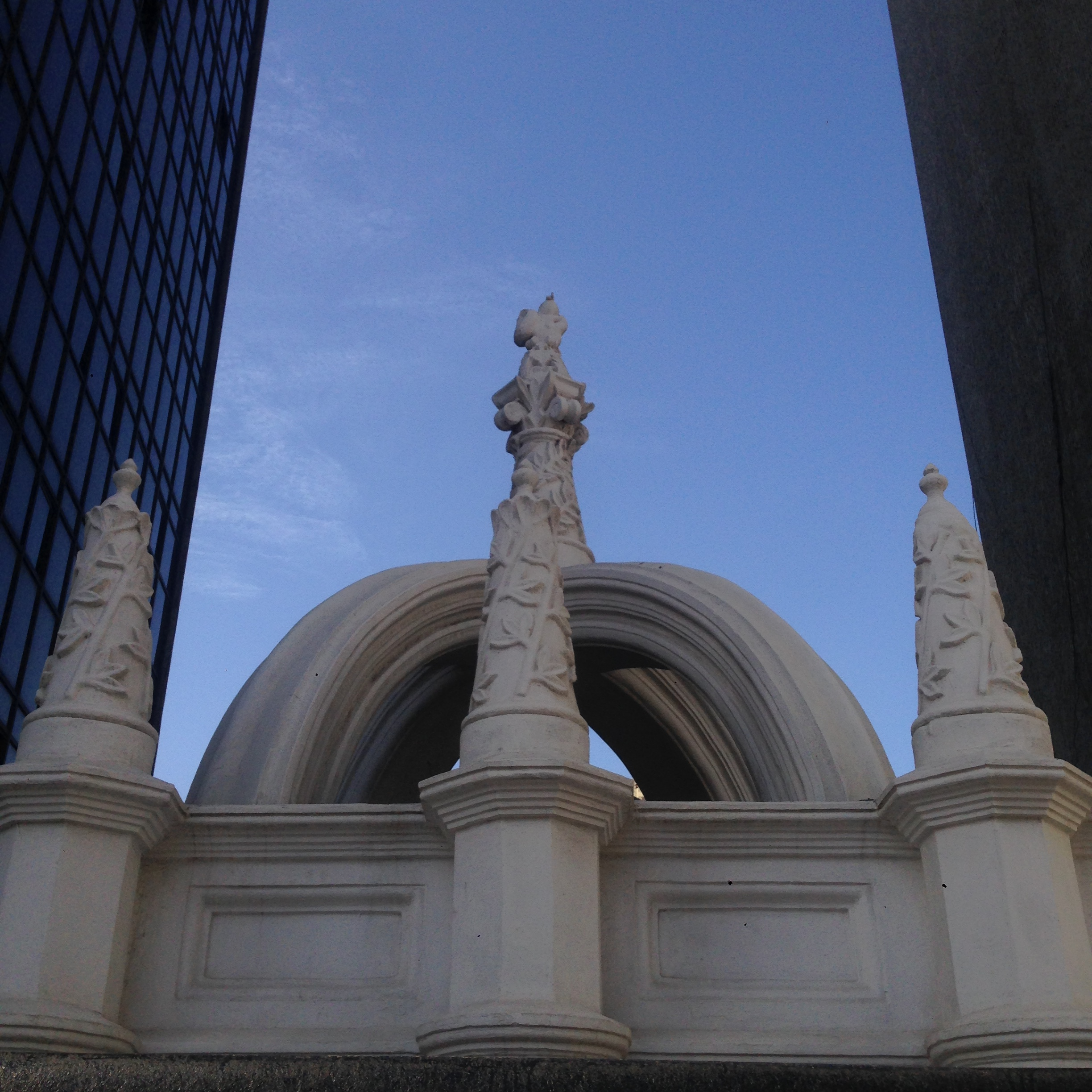
Taiwo Olowo's Cenotaph

Taiwo Olowo died in Lagos on February 20, 1901, aged 120. James Johnson (Assistant Bishop of Western Equatorial Africa) officiated his funeral. Though it is stated that Olowo was born in 1781, as there was no documentation during the time around his birth, there is no way of verifying his date of birth and thus his age.

The Taiwo Olowo cenotaph was erected over his tomb by the Brazilian-Lagosian master builder Senhor Jorge DaCosta in 1905. Its plaques were said to have been forged from the melting of hundreds of copper pennies.

His family house is still located across the street from the monument, and still belongs to his descendants. Its name, Iga Taiwo Olowo, literally translates to "Palace of Taiwo the Rich Man". Noted descendants include Kofoworola Abeni Pratt and Remi Vaughan-Richards.
