= Oshodi Tapa =

19th-century Nigerian war chief

- Born: Oshodi Landuji Tapa c. 1780; Bida, Nupe Kingdom
- Died: 1868; Lagos, Lagos Colony
- Occupations: War chief, merchant, political adviser
- Known for: War captain of Kosoko; defence of Lagos against British invasion
- Title: Oloja of Ereko

Chief Oshodi Landuji Tapa (c. 1780 – 1868) was Oba Kosoko's war captain and one of the most powerful chiefs in the Oba of Lagos' court.

== Origins ==
Oshodi Tapa is reported to have been a prince from the Nupe Kingdom at Bida who was indentured to Oba Osinlokun. Oshodi family accounts note that when Tapa was a little boy about to be loaded onto a Portuguese ship bound for the Americas, he escaped and sought refuge in Oba Osinlokun's palace. The name Tapa is a reference to the Nupe people.

== Ascendancy ==
Through his many talents, leadership, and strength of personality, Oshodi Tapa rose to become a trading agent for Oba Osinlokun. He and another slave (Dada Antonio) were sent by Oba Osilokun to Brazil to learn Portuguese, acquire the necessary commercial and cultural knowledge to conduct trade on behalf of the Oba and to collect duties from Portuguese slave traders. After serving Osilokun, Oshodi Tapa became a key adviser and military chief of Oba Kosoko.

== War chief and emissary for Oba Kosoko ==
Oshodi Tapa was with Kosoko at Epe when he fled Lagos following his feuds with Eletu Odibo. Oshodi Tapa managed the 3-week long Ogun Olomiro (Salt Water War) assault by the Kosoko faction in July 1845 on Oba Akitoye's palace resulting in Akitoye fleeing to Abeokuta. Tapa played a diplomatic role by granting Akitoye safe passage through the Agboyi Creek. In explaining Akitoye's escape to Kosoko, Tapa noted that Akitoye put his pursuers in a trance.

Oshodi Tapa participated in the last minute November 1851 diplomatic effort that the British attempted before bombarding Lagos. Tapa reportedly relayed Kosoko's rejection of British friendship to the visiting party of Consul John Beecroft, Commander Wilmot, Commander Gardner, and Lieutenant Patey.

Oshodi Tapa played a significant role in putting up a spirited defense to the British invasion of Lagos in November and December 1851. After the British defeated Kosoko, Oshodi Tapa fled with Kosoko to Epe where he remained a Kosoko ally. Oshodi Tapa played an instrumental role in negotiations for the signing of The Treaty of Epe on September 28, 1854, between Kosoko and Consul Benjamin Campbell.

== Merchant and power broker after Lagos' annexation as a British Colony in 1861 ==
Tapa returned to Lagos along with Kosoko in 1862. He settled in the Epetedo area close to the Oba's palace. He was given the traditional title of Oloja of Ereko and during this period became allied with Governor John Hawley Glover who appreciated Tapa's skills, contacts, and political experience and leveraged his relationship with Tapa to his advantage as Governor of Lagos. Glover reportedly consulted Oshodi Tapa before implementing any new public projects and he eventually became an emissary of Glover's government.

Tapa also leveraged his vast experience as a trader during his earlier years serving Oba Osinlokun in colonial Lagos. The German firm O'Swald conducted all of its business in Lagos through Tapa. He successfully transitioned from human trafficking to expanding into producing palm oil, cotton, and ivory using slave labor.

== Death ==
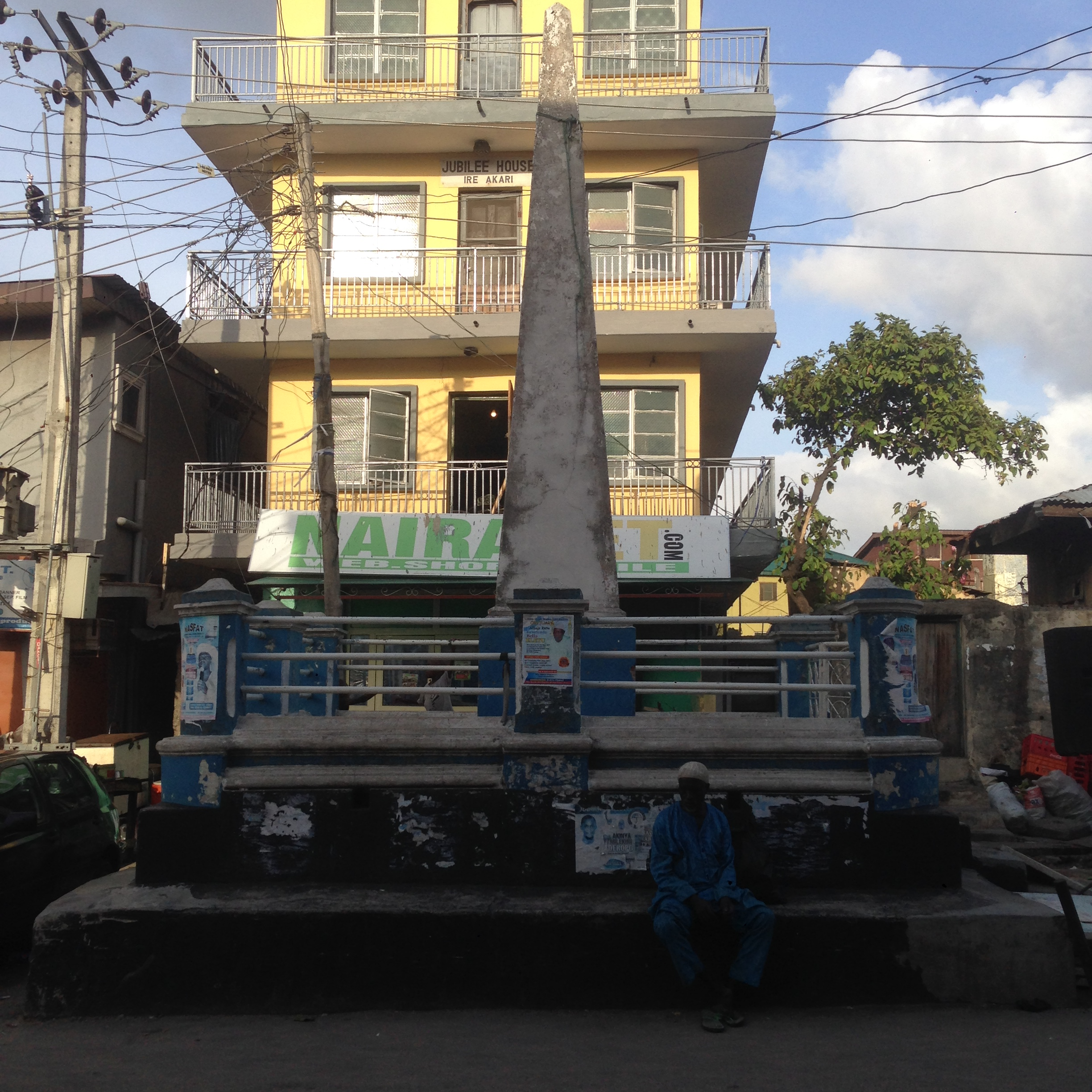
Oshodi Tapa monument in Lagos

Oshodi Tapa died in 1868 and a monument was erected outside his compound in Epetedo.
