= Lagos Treaty of Cession =

1861 forced cession of Lagos Island to the British Empire

The Treaty of Cession, 6 August 1861 or the Lagos Treaty of Cession was a treaty between the British Empire and Oba Dosunmu of Lagos (spelt 'Docemo' in English documents) wherein Dosunmu, under the threat of military bombardment, ceded Lagos Island to Britain, whilst retaining the title and powers of Oba, subject to English laws.

== Background ==
In Britain's early 19th century fight against the Atlantic slave trade, its West Africa Squadron or Preventative Squadron as it was also known, continued to pursue Portuguese, American, French and Cuban slave ships and to impose anti-slavery treaties with West African coastal chiefs with so much doggedness that they created a strong presence along the West African coast from Sierra Leone all the way to the Niger Delta (today's Nigeria) and as far south as Congo. In 1849, Britain appointed John Beecroft as Consul of the Bights of Benin and Biafra, a position he held (along with his governorship of Fernando Po) until his death in 1854. John Duncan was appointed Vice Consul and was located at Wydah. At the time of Beecroft's appointment, the Kingdom of Lagos (under Oba Kosoko) was in the western part of the Consulate of the Bights of Benin and Biafra and was a key slave trading port. In 1851 and with pressure from liberated slaves who now wielded political and business influence, Britain intervened in Lagos in what is now known as the Reduction of Lagos resulting in the installation of Oba Akitoye (and the ouster of Oba Kosoko) who signed the Treaty Between Great Britain and Lagos, 1 January 1852. The signing of the 1852 treaty ushered in the Consular Period in Lagos' history wherein Britain provided military protection to Lagos.

== The Treaty of Cession ==
Following threats from Kosoko and the French who were positioned at kingdom of Wydah, a decision was made by Lord Palmerston (British Prime Minister) who noted "the expediency of losing no time in assuming the formal Protectorate of Lagos". William McCoskry, the Acting Consul in Lagos with Commander Bedingfield convened a meeting with Oba Dosunmu on July 30, 1861, aboard HMS Prometheus where Britain's intent was explained and a response to the terms were required by August 1861. Dosunmu resisted the terms of the treaty but due to the threat to unleash a bombardment on Lagos by Commander Bedingfield, Dosunmu relented and signed the treaty.

== Treaty text ==
The text of the Lagos Treaty of Cession is transcribed below:

Treaty between Norman B. Bedingfeld, Commander of Her Majesty’s ship Prometheus, and Senior Officer of the Bights Division, and William McCoskry, Esquire, Her Britannic Majesty’s Acting Consul, on the part of Her Majesty the Queen of Great Britain, and Docemo, King of Lagos, on the part of himself and Chiefs.

Article I
In order that the Queen of England may be the better enabled to assist, defend, and protect the inhabitants of Lagos, and to put an end to the Slave Trade in this and the neighboring counties, and to prevent the destructive wars so frequently undertaken by Dahomey and others for the capture of the slaves, I, Docemo, do, with the consent and advice of my Council, give, transfer, and by these presents grant and confirm unto the Queen of Great Britain, her heirs, and successors forever, the port and Island of Lagos with all the rights, profits, territories, and appurtenances whatsoever thereunto belonging, and as well the profits and revenue as the direct, full, and absolute dominion and sovereignty of the said port, island, and premises, with all royalties thereof, freely, fully and entirely and absolutely. I do also covenant and grant that the quiet and peaceable possession thereof shall with all possible speed, be freely and effectually delivered to the Queen of Great Britain, or such person as Her Majesty shall thereunto appoint for her use in the performance of this grant; the inhabitants of said island and territories, as the Queen’s subjects, and under her sovereignty, Crown, jurisdiction, and government, being still suffered to live there

Article II
Docemo will be allowed the use of the title of King in its usual African signification, and will be permitted to decide disputes between natives of Lagos with their consent, subject to appeal to British laws.

Article III
In the transfer of lands, the stamp of Docemo affixed to the document will be proof that there are no other native claims upon it, and for this purpose he will be permitted to use it as hitherto. In consideration of the cession as before-mentioned of the port and island and territories of Lagos, the Representatives of the Queen of Great Britain do promise, subject to the approval of Her Majesty, that Docemo shall receive an annual pension from the Queen of Great Britain equal to the net revenue hitherto annually received by him; such pension to be paid at such periods and in such mode as may hereafter be determined

LAGOS, August 6, 1861
Signed
DOCEMO
TELAKE
OBALEKOW
NORMAN B. BEDINGFIELD Her Majesty’s ship Prometheus, Senior Officer, Bights Division
W. McCOSKRY, Acting Consul
