= Eletu Odibo =

Traditional kingmaker of Lagos, Nigeria

The Eletu Odibo of Lagos is the traditional nobleman that has historically served as the principal kingmaker of the Oba of Lagos. As head of the Akarigbere class of chiefs, the Eletu Odibo also serves as the prime minister of the Oba.

== History ==
The Oba of Benin deployed a group of Benin officers along with his war captain, Ashipa, to preserve Benin's interests in Lagos affairs. The Eletu Odibo was the head of this group who accompanied Ashipa to Lagos.

== Kingmaking role ==
When the Ashongbon (Head War Chief) informs the Eletu Odibo about the vacancy of the Obaship, the Eletu verifies the vacancy by visiting Iga Idunganran, the royal palace. After confirmation, the Eletu returns to his sanctuary where he consults the Ifa Oracle with names of all of the eligible males from the Lagos Ruling Houses in order to receive a divine pronouncement. The Eletu and the Ashongbon then summon a meeting where the Obaship candidate is presented. Those who attend the presentation include: the Omo-Obas (the various royals), the Ibigas (slaves), White Cap Chiefs, War Chiefs, and representatives of communities that owe allegiance to the Oba of Lagos.

== Eletu Odibo's feud with Prince Kosoko ==
=== Genesis ===
A bitter feud between the Eletu Odibo and the then prince Kosoko erupted in the earlier part of the 19th century. Kosoko offended the Eletu by marrying a woman that had been betrothed to Chief Eletu Odibo. Eletu Odibo, as Chief Kingmaker, took offense at Kosoko's arrogant decision and thereafter used his position to frustrate his multiple Obaship bids in the years to come.

=== Kosoko's 1st Obaship bid frustrated by Eletu Odibo ===
When Oba Osinlokun died in 1829, Kosoko's brother, Idewu Ojulari, became Oba and reigned from 1829 to around 1834/5. Idewu Ojulari's reign was unpopular, however, and at the behest of the Oba of Benin, to whom the people of Lagos had petitioned (Lagos was under Benin suzerainty up until the reigns of Oba Akitoye and Dosunmu, who rebuffed the payment of tribute to Benin), Idewu Ojulari committed suicide. Since Kosoko was now unacceptable to Eletu Odibo, the Kingmakers invited the exiled Adele home from Badagry to rule as Oba of Lagos for a second term.

=== Kosoko's 2nd Obaship bid frustrated by Eletu Odibo ===
Oba Adele's second reign ended upon his death in 1837 and again, Eletu Odibo blocked Kosoko's accession and installed Oluwole, Adele's son, instead.

=== Feud gets personal ===
The intensity of the Eletu Odibo and Kosoko feud increased after this, with Eletu Odibo extending his vendetta to Opo Olu, Kosoko's sister, accusing her of witchcraft. The diviners found Opo Olu innocent but not before Oba Oluwole banished her from Lagos. Some accounts indicate that Eletu Odibo subsequently executed Opo Olu by having her drowned. Eletu's personal vendetta led Kosoko and his followers to pursue a failed armed rising known as Ogun Ewe Koko ("leaves of the coco-yam war"). This resulted in Kosoko and his followers fleeing to Epe after their defeat. Eletu Odibo then intensified the hatred between both camps by digging up Kosoko's mother's remains and throwing them into the Lagos lagoon.

=== Kosoko's revenge ===
After Oba Oluwole died in an explosion at the Oba's palace in 1841, Akitoye became Oba. Akitoye naively tried to appease an embittered Kosoko by inviting him back to Lagos and attempting to placate him with gifts. Considering the feud between Eletu and Kosoko, Eletu fiercely protested Akitoye's actions. Kosoko's return to Lagos meant Eletu Odibo had to go on exile since both camps would have no peace. Akitoye recalled Eletu Odibo from Badagry, leading Kosoko to declare that if Eletu Odibo returned to Lagos, he would "make himself king".

Tensions between Akitoye and Kosoko rose significantly, leading to Akitoye urgently requesting Eletu Odibo's return. On July 21, 1845, the Eletu returned to Lagos with an army of supporters from Badagry and was met by Kosoko's troops stationed by the waterfront to prevent his return. Fighting broke out in the battle named Ogun Olomiro (Salt Water War) resulting in the Kosoko faction laying siege to the Oba's Palace for three weeks. Kosoko was victorious and Akitoye was exiled.

Following this, Eletu Odibo was captured and Kosoko avenged the scattering of his mother's bones by the Eletu (and presumably Opo Olu's drowning) by placing Eletu Odibo in an empty oil barrel, sealing it, setting it on fire, and dumping it in the Lagos Lagoon.
