= John Hawley Glover =

British colonial administrator (1829–1885)

Captain Sir John Hawley Glover GCMG
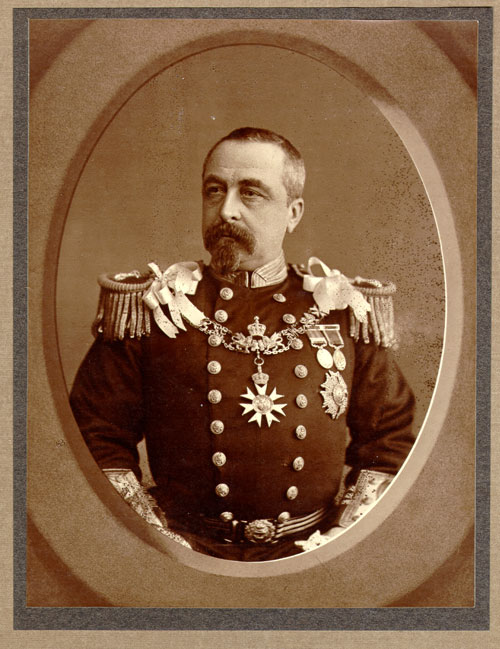
- Sir John Hawley Glover (1829-1885)

Governor of Lagos Colony
- In office 1863–1876
- Preceded by: Henry Stanhope Freeman
- Succeeded by: Cornelius Alfred Moloney

Governor of Newfoundland
- In office 1876–1881
- Preceded by: Sir Stephen John Hill
- Succeeded by: Sir Henry Berkeley Fitzhardinge Maxse
- In office 1883–1885
- Preceded by: Sir Henry Berkeley Fitzhardinge Maxse
- Succeeded by: Sir William Des Vœux

Governor of the Leeward Islands
- In office 1881–1884
- Preceded by: H. J. B. Bufford-Hancock
- Succeeded by: Sir Charles Cameron Lees

Personal details
- Born: 24 February 1829
- Died: 30 September 1885 (aged 56) London, England
- Military career
- Allegiance: United Kingdom
- Branch: Royal Navy
- Service years: 1841-1862
- Rank: Captain
- Conflicts: Second Anglo-Burmese War

Viceregal styles of Sir John Hawley Glover
- Reference style: His Excellency
- Spoken style: Your Excellency

Sir John Hawley Glover GCMG (24 February 1829 – 30 September 1885) was a Royal Navy officer who served as Governor of Lagos Colony, Governor of Newfoundland, and Governor of British Leeward Islands.

== Naval career ==
He entered the service in 1841 and passed his examination as lieutenant in 1849, but did not receive a commission until May 1851.

He served on various stations, and was wounded severely in an action with the Burmese at Donabew (4 February 1853). During his years of service as lieutenant in the navy he gained considerable experience off the coast of Africa, and took part in the expedition of Dr WB Baikie up the Niger. Glover also commanded a gunboat that patrolled the Lagos Lagoon in 1861.

== Governor of Lagos Colony ==
On 21 April 1863, he was appointed administrator of the government of Lagos Colony, and in that capacity, or as colonial secretary, he remained there until 1872. His style of governing Lagos was controversial to officials in the British Colonial office who complained about his "disregard for all rules and orders". To Lagosians, however, Glover was popular and was affectionally called Oba Globar because of his adoption of patterns rooted in local culture. He presided over many Lagosians disputes, bypassing newly instituted colonial courts. He shrewdly cultivated relationships with Lagosians such as Oshodi Tapa, Kosoko, and Taiwo Olowo who were previously beneficiaries of the Trans Atlantic Slave Trade and encouraged them along the path of legitimate commerce. Curiously, these were political foes of the now weakened Oba of Lagos, Dosunmu who ceded Lagos to Britain in August 1861 under the Lagos Treaty of Cession. In return, Glover's cultivated network of Lagosian loyalists provided him with intelligence and information that enabled him to govern effectively.

=== Establishing the forerunner of the Nigerian Army and Police ===
Glover formed the nucleus of present-day Nigeria's Army and Police with 10 Hausa runaway slaves on 1 June 1863. The group was known as Glover's Hausas or 'Glover's Forty Thieves'. Glover went to great lengths to develop bonds of personal loyalty with the Armed Hausas. He personally trained, commanded, and chose his successors, ensuring their loyalty. In return for their loyalty, Glover rewarded his troops with land and dwellings. He raised their pay and provided them with smart uniforms that broadcast their status of free men and agents of the British colonial government.

After this period Glover was employed to repel incursions of the Ashantis. When the Third Anglo-Ashanti War broke out in 1873, Captain Glover undertook the task of organizing the native people, whose hatred of the Ashantis might be expected to make them favourable to the British authorities—to the extent at least to which their fears would allow them to act. His services were accepted, and in September 1873, he landed at Cape Coast in the Gold Coast and, after forming a small trustworthy force of Hausa, marched to Accra. His influence sufficed to gather a numerous native force.

In January 1874, Captain Glover was able to render some assistance in the taking of Kumasi, but it was at the head of a Hausa force. His services were acknowledged by Parliament and by his appointment to Knight Grand Cross of the Order of St Michael and St George in the 1874 Birthday Honours.

== Governor of Newfoundland, and Leeward Islands ==
In 1875, he was appointed governor of Newfoundland and held the post until 1881, when he was transferred to the Leeward Islands. He returned to Newfoundland in 1883 as governor again.

== Death and legacy ==
Glover died in London on 30 September 1885. Lady Glover's Life of her husband appeared in 1897. Lagosians raised money in 1885 to build a public hall in his memory - Glover Memorial Hall, situated on land donated by Madam Tinubu, a sometimes adversary and collaborator of Glover. There is also a memorial to him in St Paul's Cathedral in London. The beautiful, scenic community of Glovertown, Newfoundland, birthplace of author Stanley Sparkes, is named after him. The unincorporated community of Glovers Harbour in Newfoundland is named after him.

== See also ==
- Governors of Newfoundland
- List of people from Newfoundland and Labrador
- Selim Aga

Government offices
| Preceded by Henry Stanhope Freeman | Governor of Lagos Colony; 1863–1876 | Succeeded by |
| Preceded by Sir Stephen John Hill | Governor of Newfoundland; 1876–1881 | Succeeded by Sir Henry Berkeley Fitzhardinge Maxse |
| Preceded by H. J. B. Bufford-Hancock, acting | Governor of the Leeward Islands; 1881–1884 | Succeeded by Sir Charles Cameron Lees |
| Preceded by Sir Henry Berkeley Fitzhardinge Maxse | Governor of Newfoundland; 1883–1885 | Succeeded by Sir William Des Vœux |
