= Oluwole (Oba) =

- Oba of Lagos
- Reign: 1837 - 1841
- Predecessor: Adele
- Successor: Akitoye
- Born: Oluwole; Lagos
- Died: 1841; Lagos
- Burial: Lagos
- Father: Adele
- Religion: Ifá

Oba Oluwole (died 1841) reigned as Oba of Lagos from 1837 to 1841. His father was Oba Adele.

== Rivalry with Kosoko ==
The genesis of Oba Oluwole and prince Kosoko's rivalry appears rooted in their competing bids for the Obaship of Lagos upon the death of Oba Adele. When Oluwole became Oba, he banished Kosoko's sister, Opo Olu from Lagos, even after diviners found her innocent of practicing witchcraft. Furthermore, after Oluwole quelled Kosoko's armed uprising known as Ogun Ewe Koko ("leaves of the coco-yam war"), Oluwole dispatched his war captain - Yesufu Bada - on a military mission to recapture loot from Kosoko's camp.

== Death from accidental gunpowder explosion ==
Oluwole died in 1841 when lightning triggered an explosion at the Oba's place. Oluwole's body was blown to pieces and could only be identified by his royal beads adorning his body.
