= First Post Office, Ejinrin =

Historic post office in Lagos State, Nigeria

Coordinates: 6.6143°N 3.8904°E

First Post Office, Ejinrin is a postal facility in Ejinrin, a town in Lagos State, Nigeria. The post office is associated with the expansion of the colonial postal network into communities outside Lagos during the late nineteenth century. Ejinrin was a commercial and transportation centre in colonial Lagos, serving as a lagoon market that linked Lagos with communities in the interior. Local historical accounts and newspaper reports identify the post office as one of the earliest postal facilities in the Lagos hinterland and a notable landmark in Ejinrin’s history.

== See also ==
- Nigerian Postal Service
- History of Lagos
- Epe, Lagos State
