= Adele Ajosun =

Adele
- Oba of Lagos
- Reign: c 1811 - 1821; 1835 - 1837
- Predecessor: Ologun Kutere 1st term predecessor Idewu Ojulari 2nd term predecessor
- Successor: Osinlokun 1st term successor Oluwole 2nd term successor
- Born: Lagos
- Died: 1837; Lagos
- Burial: Lagos
- Issue: Oluwole
- House: Ado, Ologun Kutere
- Father: Ologun Kutere
- Religion: Yoruba religion

Oba Adele or Adele Ajosun (died 1837) reigned twice as Oba of Lagos; first, from c1811 to 1821, and a second time from 1835 to 1837. His father was Oba Ologun Kutere and his siblings were Obas Osinlokun and Akitoye, thus the Ologun Kutere line has remained the dominant line in the Obaship of Lagos.

== Ascendancy ==
Adele ascended the Obaship of Lagos after the approximate 5 year interregnum following the death of his father Ologun Kutere. Some written and oral sources note that Ologun Kutere desired that Adele become Oba because of Adele's faithful service to Ologun Kutere. Historian John. B. Losi wrote about Adele's care of Ologun Kutere's property while the Lander brothers (Richard and John Lander) note Adele's mechanical aptitude.

During Adele's reign the Islamic faith spread in Lagos and his popularity is reported to have decreased among Lagosians because his children introduced the Egun masquerade, which at the time was seen as unbecoming.

== Osinlokun's coup and Adele's exile to Badagry ==
Around 1820 or 1821, and as was the tradition before 1852 when Lagos exercised more independence from the Benin Empire, Adele attempted to accompany Ologun Kutere's remains to Benin for burial, however, Osinlokun and his supporters forcibly prevented Adele from doing so and in the process usurped the Obaship from Adele. Adele was now exiled to Badagry where he assumed headship of the town. In 1825, while in Badagry, Adele attempted to violently retake the Lagos throne with the help of the British Navy but his efforts were futile. He reportedly sank into depression when a gunpowder explosion destroyed his home, property, and followers.

== Second term following Idewu Ojulari's ritual suicide ==
Osinlokun died in 1829 and was succeeded by his son Idewu Ojulari.

After Oba Idewu Ojulari was compelled by the Oba of Benin (around 1834/5) to commit ritual suicide, Idewu's brother prince Kosoko should have been made king but because of Kosoko's impetuous nature resulting in taking a woman betrothed to Eletu Odibo, an ensuing feud prevented Eletu Odibo from installing Kosoko king. As a result, Adele (uncle to Kosoko and Idewu) was invited from Badagry to become Oba.

== Marriage to Madam Tinubu ==
While visiting Abeokuta as an exiled Oba in 1833, Adele was charmed by Madam Tinubu and married her. They moved to Badagry which was traditionally the place of refuge for Lagos monarchs and was where Tinubu exploited Adele's connections to build a formidable business trading in tobacco, salt, and slaves.

== Death ==
Adele died in 1837 and was succeeded as Oba by his son, Oluwole.
