= Treaty of Epe =

1854 treaty between the United Kingdom and Epe

The Treaty of Epe was a treaty between Great Britain (represented by Benjamin Campbell, Consul in Lagos and Thomas Miller Commander of HMS Crane) and Kosoko on 28 September 1854.

== Background ==
On 26 December 1851, in what is now known as the Reduction of Lagos Britain intervened in Lagos politics by executing naval action against Kosoko, then Oba of Lagos, ousting him, and installing Oba Akitoye who had promised to embrace abolition. On 1 January 1852 Akitoye signed the Treaty between Great Britain and Lagos abolishing the slave trade.

Kosoko fled to Epe and built up an independent base with about 400 warriors and mounted multiple attacks on Lagos; one on 5 August 1853 and another on 11 August 1853 which came dangerously close to the Oba's palace but was rebuffed just in time by a burst of fire from the British naval force under Commander Phillips of HMS Polyphemus.

After much negotiation, Kosoko eventually signed the Treaty of Epe on 28 September 1854 with Consul Benjamin Campbell, agreeing not to make any claims to Lagos or to endanger commerce in Lagos. The treaty was a tactical success for Kosoko who got the British to recognize his state in Epe. In the big picture, however, the Lagos throne remained out of reach with Akitoye and Dosunmu's descendants firmly rooted.

== Treaty text ==
The text of the treaty is transcribed below:

Agreement entered into this 28th day of September 1854 between Kosoko his Caboceers and Chiefs and Chiefs, and Benjamin Campbell Esquire Her Brittanic Majesty's Consul for the Bight of Benin, and Thomas Miller Esquire Commander H.M.S. Sloop "Crane" Senior Officer of the Bights of Benin and Biafra.

1st. Kosoko his Caboceers and Chiefs solemnly pledge themselves to make no attempt to regain possession of Lagos either by threats, hostilities or stratagem

2nd. Kosoko his Caboceers and Chiefs claim Palma, as their port of trade, and Benjamin Campbell Esquire Her Brittanic Majesty's Consul, and Thomas Miller Esquire Commander and Senior Naval Officer in the Bights, engage to recognize Palma, as the port of Kosoko and his Caboceers and Chiefs, for all purposes of legitimate trade.

3rd. Kosoko his Caboceers and Chiefs do most solemnly pledge themselves to abandon the slave trade, that is the export of slaves from Africa, also not to allow any slave trader to reside at their port or any other place within their jurisdiction and influence

4th. Kosoko his Caboceers and Chiefs solemnly bind themselves to give every protection and assistance to such merchants and traders as may wish to reside among them for the purpose of carrying on legitimate trade – also to assist her Brittanic Majesty's Consul to reopen markets on the Jaboo shore viz Agienu, Ecorodu, and Aboyee, and in maintaining order and security at those markets.

5th. There shall be levied at the Port of Palma, an export duty of one head of cowries for every Puncheon of Palm Oil of the average size of one hundred and twenty gallons and two strings of cowries per lb. on all Ivory exported from the above Port for the benefit of Kosoko.

6th. Benjamin Campbell Esquire Her Brittanic Majesty's Consul engages on behalf of her Majesty's Government that for the due and faithful performance of this engagement on the part of Kosoko his Caboceers and Chiefs there shall be paid to Kosoko by her Majesty's Government an annual allowance for his life of Two thousand heads of cowries or one thousand dollars at his option.

7th. This engagement to have full force and effect from this day and until annulled by Her Brittanic Majesty's Government.

7th. This engagement to have full force and effect from this day and until annulled by Her Brittanic Majesty's Government.

Signed up the Lagoon at Appe this 28th day of September 1854
Kosoko X
Oloosema X
Oloto X
Pelleu X
Agenia X
Bosoopo X
Agagoo X
Obatchi X
Whydobah X
Bagaloo X
Apsee X
Oleesau X
Ettee X
Lomosa X
Otcheodee X

B. Campbell (Her Brittanic Majesty's Consul for the Bight of Benin)
Thos. Miller (Commander H.M.S. ‘Crane’ and Senior Officer of the Bights of Benin and Biafra)

In the presence of
Herbert L. Ryves, Lieut. Commander of ‘Minx’
W.P. Braund, Master H.M.S ‘Crane’
Francis Wm. Davis, Assistant Surgeon, ‘Minx’
Geo. Batt. Scala, merchant of Lagos
W.R. Hansen, merchant of Lagos
Jose Pedro da Cousta Roy, merchant of Lagos
S.B. Williams, merchant of Lagos and interpreter
