= Ojulari =

- Gender: Male
- Language: Yoruba

Origin
- Origin: Nigeria
- Meaning: Outwardness
- Region of origin: South West, Nigeria

Ojulari is a Nigerian surname of Yoruba origin. Notable people with the surname include:

- Azeez Ojulari (born 2000), American football player
- BJ Ojulari (born 2002), American football player
- Idewu Ojulari (died c. 1835), Lagos ruler
