= Segunda Rosario =

Schooner involved in the slave trade

Segunda Rosario was a schooner involved in the slave trade which was captured in 1841.

In 1840 Segunda Rosario set sail for West Africa from Havana laden with tobacco and "ready made clothes". After arriving at the Pongo River, the ship took on board 288 enslaved Africans and set sail for Puerto Rico on 3 January 1841. On 27 January the ship was intercepted by Captain Alexander Milne of HMS Cleopatra. Amongst the papers found on the ship was a document signed by Niara Bely (a.k.a. Isabela Lightbourn) asserting that 40 of the slaves were for her son Joseph Lightbourn. A second document signed by Benjamin Campbell certifying that John Boson was a free native of Rio Pongo and that he had hired himself as cook for the vessel. These documents lead to an investigation of Campbell as regards his possible involvement in the slave trade, something which he strenuously denied.
