= Idewu Ojulari =

- Oba of Lagos
- Reign: 1829 - c1835
- Predecessor: Osinlokun
- Successor: Adele Ajosun
- Born: Idewu Ojulari; Lagos
- Died: c 1835; Lagos
- House: Ado, Ologun Kutere, Osinlokun
- Father: Osinlokun

Oba Idewu Ojulari (died c 1835) reigned as Oba of Lagos from 1829 to about 1834/5. His father was Oba Osinlokun and his siblings were Kosoko (who was Oba from 1845 to 1851) and Opo Olu, a wealthy and powerful female slave holder.

== Idewu Ojulari's ritual suicide ==
Idewu Ojulari became Oba after his father Osilokun died in 1829. However, Idewu Ojulari's reign was unpopular and at the behest of the Oba of Benin, to whom the people of Lagos had petitioned, Idewu Ojulari committed suicide. Notably, Lagos had hitherto been under Benin suzerainty up until the reign of Oba Kosoko who was dethroned by British forces in 1851. Thereafter, Oba Akitoye and his successor, Oba Dosunmu, rebuffed payment of annual tributes to Benin.

According to historian Kristin Mann, Idewu Ojulari's unpopularity may have been caused by the economic downturn in the slave trade following the prosperous years of Osinlokun's reign. Idewu's chiefs reportedly communicated their displeasure to the Oba of Benin, who sent Idewu a skull, a sword, and a message that "the people of Lagos would no longer recognize him as their King". Idewu recognized the skull as an invitation to take poison and the sword as a call to battle. Idewu picked the poison option and committed suicide.
