= John Duncan (explorer) =

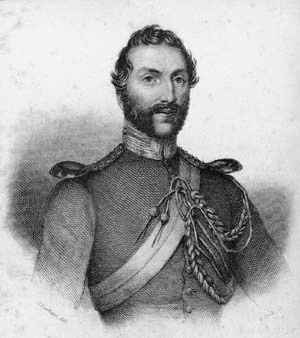
- Born: 1805
- Died: 1849 (aged 43–44)

John Duncan (1805–1849) was a Scottish explorer in Africa.

== Life ==
He was born in 1805 at Culdoach near Kirkcudbright, the son of a farmer. He had a strong frame and little education.

When seventeen years old he enlisted in the 1st Regiment of Life Guards. He taught himself drawing during his service, and in 1839 left the army with a high character. He next obtained an appointment as master-at-arms in Albert, which with Wilberforce and Soudan sailed on the Niger expedition of 1841. On the voyage out he was wounded by a poisoned arrow in a conflict with the natives at the Cape de Verde Isles. Duncan held a conspicuous position in all the treaties made with the native chiefs. He was selected to march at the head of his party, in the cumbrous uniform of a Lifeguard, when the heat was fearful even to the natives themselves. When at Egga, the highest point reached by the Albert on the Niger, he ventured upon an exploration further up, taking a few natives only, but sickness compelled the abandonment of the project. On reaching Fernando Po, Duncan was attacked by fever, the effects of which were aggravated by his previous wound; he reached England in an emaciated condition.

As soon as his health improved Duncan proposed to penetrate the unknown land from the western coast to the Mountains of Kong, and between the Lagos and Niger rivers.

His plans were approved by the Royal Geographical Society, and the lords of the admiralty granted him a free passage in HMS Prometheus, which left England on 17 June 1844, and reached Cape Castle on 22 July following. After an attack of fever he commenced his journey from the coast to Whydah, and afterwards made the unexampled feat of a passage through the Dahomey country to Adofidiah, of which he sent particulars to the Royal Geographical Society, dated 19 April and 4 October 1845. He was refused a passage through the Ashantee country, but was favourably received by the king of Dahomey. Another attack of fever was followed by a breaking out of the old wound, and Duncan made preparations to amputate his own leg. He succeeded, however, in returning to Cape Coast. There, early in 1846, he planned a journey to Timbuktu. Funds to assist him were being forwarded by his friends in England, when his health compelled him to return, and he sailed for home in February 1846.

In 1849, Duncan proposed to continue his explorations, and the government appointed him vice-consul at Whydah. He arrived in the Bight of Benin, but died on board the ship Kingfisher on 3 November 1849.

== Works ==
In 1847, he published Travels in Western Africa in 1845 and 1846, comprising a Journey from Whydah through the Kingdom of Dahomey to Adofidiah in the Interior, 2 volumes, London, duodecimo. The preface is dated "Feltham Hill, August 1847". The work has a steel portrait of the author by Durham, and a map of the route. The same year he contributed to Bentley's Miscellany a paper in two parts, entitled Some Account of the late Expedition to the Niger.

Duncan's sense and powers of observation make up for deficient education, and his book contains many interesting notices of African superstitions.

== Family ==
He was married, and his wife survived him.
