= Kosoko =

Oba of Lagos (r. 1845–51)

- Oba of Lagos
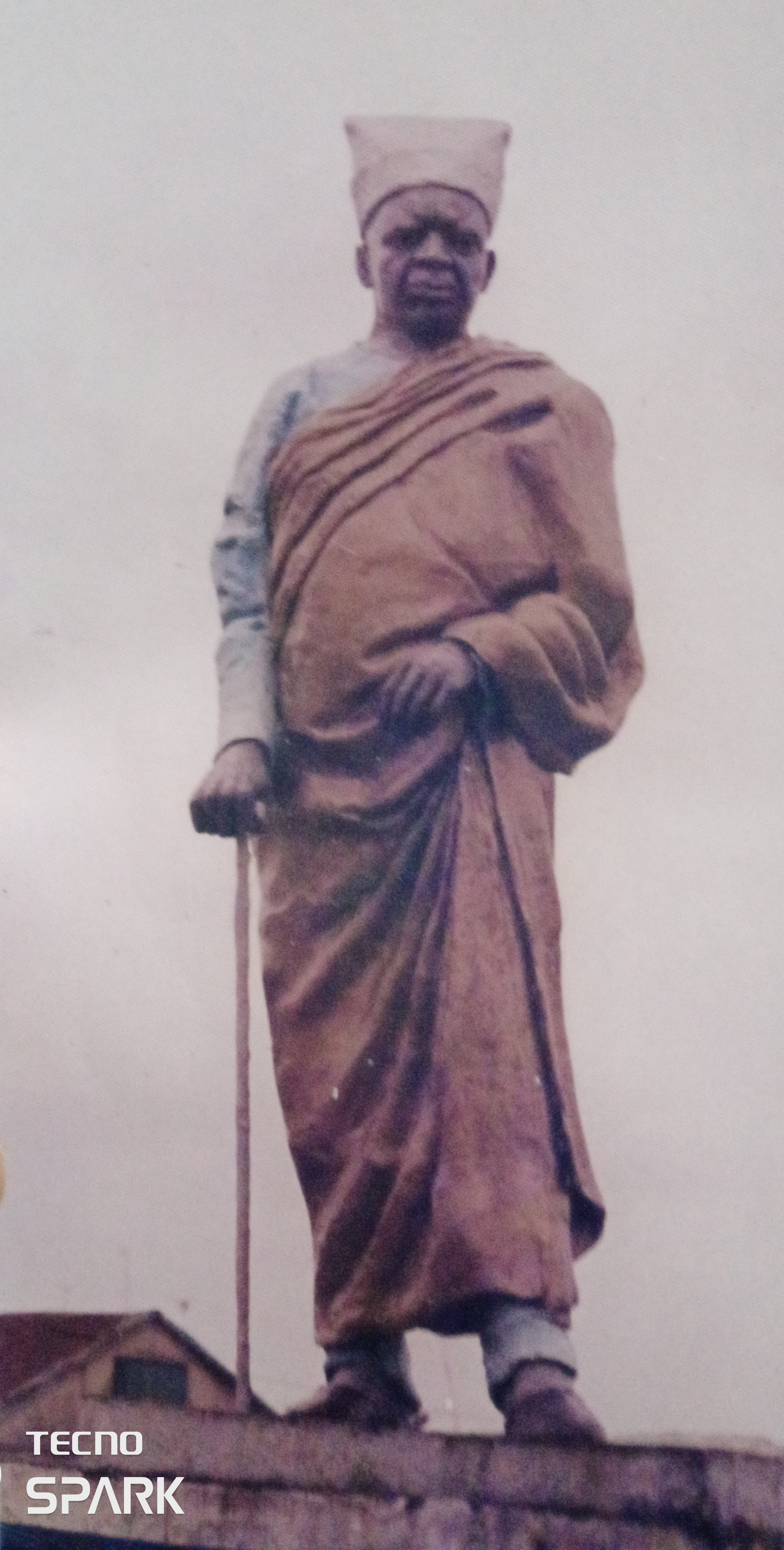
- Reign: 1845–1851
- Predecessor: Akitoye
- Successor: Akitoye
- Born: Kosoko; Lagos
- Died: 1872; Lagos
- Burial: Iga Ereko, Lagos
- Father: Osinlokun

Kosoko (died 1872) was a member of the Ologun Kutere Lagos Royal Family who reigned as Oba of Lagos from 1845 to 1851. His father was Oba Osinlokun and his siblings were Idewu Ojulari (who was Oba from 1829 to 1834/35), Olufunmi, Odunsi, Ladega, Ogunbambi, Akinsanya, Ogunjobi, Akimosa, Ibiyemi, Adebajo, Matimoju, Adeniyi, Isiyemi, Igbalu, Oresanya, and Idewu-Ojulari.

== Ascendancy ==
Kosoko's ascendancy to the Obaship of Lagos in 1845 was predated by a series of dramatic events.

=== Rift between the Esinlokun and Adele lines ===
When Oba Ologun Kutere died (between 1800 and 1805), a succession struggle ensued between his older son (Osinlokun) and his younger and preferred son (Adele). Though the kingship was not determined by birth order but by Kingmakers and consultation of the Ifa Oracle, Osinlokun and his followers mounted opposition to Adele's kingship. Adele's reign was then cut short in 1819 by his older brother, Osinlokun, in 1819, forcing Adele to exile to Badagry where he assumed the headship of the town.

=== Genesis of Kosoko's feud with Eletu Odibo ===
Kosoko offended the powerful prime minister (Eletu Odibo)and Kingmaker by marrying a woman betrothed to Chief Eletu Odibo. Eletu Odibo, as head of the Akarigbere class of chiefs, was vested with the authority to oversee the selection and installation of obas. Kosoko's arrogant decision would come to haunt his bid for the throne as Chief Eletu Odibo took great offense and the feud between both men altered the Obaship succession many times and set the stage for British intervention in Lagos later in 1851.

=== Osinlokun's death, Idewu Ojulari's short term, and manifestation of the Eletu and Kosoko feud ===
When Osinlokun died in 1819, Kosoko's brother, Idewu Ojulari, became Oba and reigned from 1819 to around 1834/5. However, Idewu Ojulari's reign was unpopular and at the behest of the Oba of Benin, to whom the people of Lagos had petitioned, Idewu Ojulari committed suicide. Notably, Lagos had hitherto been under Benin suzerainty up until the reign of Oba Kosoko who was dethroned by British forces in 1851. Thereafter, Oba Akitoye and his successor, Oba Dosunmu, rebuffed payment of annual tributes to Benin.

Since Kosoko was now unacceptable to Eletu Odibo, the Kingmakers invited Adele home from Badagry to rule as Oba of Lagos for a second term. Oba Adele's second reign terminated upon his death in 1837 and again, Eletu Odibo blocked Kosoko's accession and installed Oluwole, Adele's son.

=== Increased strife between Kosoko and Eletu Odibo's allies ===
The intensity of the Eletu Odibo and Kosoko feud increased with Eletu Odibo extending his vendetta to Opo Olu, Kosoko's sister, accusing her of witchcraft. The diviners found Opo Olu innocent however Oba Oluwole banished Opo Olu from Lagos, leading Kosoko and his followers to pursue a failed armed uprising known as Ogun Ewe Koko ("leaves of the coco-yam war") which resulted in Kosoko and his followers fleeing to Epe.

Eletu Odibo then ratcheted up the hatred between both camps by digging up Kosoko's mother's remains and throwing her corpse into the Lagos lagoon.

=== Oba Oluwole's death and Akitoye's ascendancy ===
Oba Oluwole was killed in 1841 when lightning triggered an explosion at the Oba's place. Oluwole's body was blown to pieces and could only be identified by his royal beads adorning his body. Kingmakers would have invited Kosoko to become Oba but his whereabouts were unknown. Consequently, Akitoye, Kosoko's uncle, younger brother to Osinlokun & Adele, and son of Ologun Kutere was installed as Oba of Lagos.

=== Akitoye's naivety and Kosoko's revenge ===
In an attempt at reconciliation (met with fierce resistance from chiefs, not least Eletu Odibo) with his nephew, Oba Akitoye naively recalled Kosoko to Lagos. Kosoko returned to Lagos aboard the ship of the famous slave trader Jose Domingo Martinez. Akitoye tried to placate Kosoko with gifts and granted him the title Oloja of Ereko or owner of Ereko. Kosoko quickly consolidated his position and found support among many war chiefs and among the Muslim community. Eletu Odibo was concerned with Kosoko's power consolidation and departed for Badagry. In turn, Akitoye recalled Eletu Odibo from Badagry, leading Kosoko to declare that if Eletu Odibo returned to Lagos, he would "make himself king".

A war of words ensued between Oba Akitoye and Kosoko sending his crier around Lagos singing "Tell that little child at court yonder to be careful; for if he is not careful he will be punished". Akitoye deployed his crier singing "I am like a pin firmly driven into the ground, which is always hard to root out but ever remains firm". Kosoko retorted "I am the digger who always roots out a pin".

The tensions led to a rising named Ogun Olomiro (Salt Water War) by the Kosoko faction in July 1845. The Kosoko faction laid siege to the Oba's Palace for three weeks. Akitoye eventually accepted defeat, escaped up the lagoon to the north, and was granted safe passage through the Agboyi Creek by Oshodi Tapa, Kosoko's war captain. Oshodi Tapa explained Akitoye's escape to Kosoko by saying that Akitoye put his enemies in a trance. Akitoye thereafter arrived in Abeokuta where he was granted asylum. Recognizing Akitoye's escape as a threat, Kosoko demanded Akitoye's head from the Egbas who refused Kosoko's demands. In March 1845, the Egbas provided the now deposed Akitoye with an escort to Badagry, the traditional town of refuge for Lagosians where he rallied his followers and built a partnership with European missionaries and with the British through their Consul John Beecroft.

Importantly, Eletu Odibo was captured in the battle and Kosoko avenged the scattering of his mother's bones by the Eletu by placing Eletu Odibo in an empty oil barrel, sealing it, setting it alight, and dumping it in the Lagos Lagoon.

== British intervention in Lagos ==
A confluence of interests in Lagos from the now deposed Akitoye who allied himself with the anti-slavery cause in order to get British support, the Anglican missionaries in Badagry who were in contact with Akitoye, and Egba and European traders who wanted freer movement of goods ratcheted up British intervention in Lagos.

In November 1851, a British party met with Oba Kosoko to present a proposal of British friendly relations along with giving up the Trans Atlantic Slave Trade. The proposal was rejected by Kosoko "on the technical reason that Lagos was under the Oba of Benin and that it was only that Oba who could deal with foreign powers concerning the status of Lagos"

On 4 December 1851, upon Kosoko's successful repulsion and the defeat of British forces, Consul Beecroft wrote to the Oba of Benin declaring that "Kosoko, by opening fire on a flag of truce, had declared war on England" and therefore had to be replaced by Akitoye. He threatened that Kosoko had till the end of the month to surrender otherwise "Lagos will be totally destroyed by fire".

On 26 December 1851, in what is now known as the Bombardment of Lagos or Reduction of Lagos, HMS Bloodhound, HMS Teazer, and a flotilla of boats mounted an attack on the Oba's palace. Kosoko put up a spirited defence but by 28 December 1851, the battle known locally as Ogun Ahoyaya or Ogun Agidingbi (after boiling cannons) was over with Kosoko and his followers fleeing to Ijebu. Akitoye has now installed Oba of Lagos with British support.

On 1 January 1852, Akitoye signed the Treaty between Great Britain and Lagos abolishing the slave trade.

== Kosoko in exile at Epe ==
Kosoko eventually settled in Epe. Epe was the place where about 15 years earlier a number of his followers such as his chiefs Dada Antonio and Osho Akanbi had taken refuge. By 1852, Kosoko had built up an independent base with about 400 warriors (including Oshodi Tapa) to mount his opposition to Akitoye.

In 1853, Kosoko mounted two attacks on Lagos; one on 5 August 1853 and another on 11 August 1853 which came dangerously close to the Oba's palace but was rebuffed just in time by a burst of fire from the British naval force under Commander Phillips of HMS Polyphemus.

Kosoko eventually signed The Treaty of Epe on 28 September 1854 with Consul Benjamin Campbell, agreeing not to make any claims to Lagos or to endanger commerce in Lagos. The treaty was a tactical success for Kosoko who got the British to recognize his state in Epe. In the big picture, however, the Lagos throne remained out of reach with Akitoye and Dosunmu's descendants firmly rooted.

== Return to Lagos ==
In 1860, Kosoko persuaded the Oba of Benin to send messages to Dosunmu pressing him to allow Kosoko's return to Lagos. Dosunmu, now under British authority, refused this request and noted that things were "not as in former times when Lagos was under the King of Benin to whom annually a tribute was paid".

After Britain annexed Lagos via the Treaty of 1861, Kosoko was allowed to return to Lagos with the title of Oloja of Ereko, receiving a pension of £400 annually. Oshodi Tapa, settled in Epetedo.

== Death and legacy ==
Kosoko died in 1872 and was buried at Iga Ereko in Lagos. The Kosoko-Akitoye/Dosunmu rivalry spilled over into the economic realm. Oba Dosunmu's supporters didn't fully appreciate the British presence in Lagos, while Kosoko's allies exploited the relationship. Kosoko's camp comprised men such as Oshodi Tapa and Taiwo Olowo, who enthusiastically entered into trade with European firms. At the head of the Dosunmu economic faction was Chief Apena Ajasa, who repeatedly clashed with Taiwo Olowo. When Kosoko died, the colonial government estimated that his economic faction was the more powerful one due to the fact that it was composed of at least 20,000 followers.

Three prominent descendants of his are Omoba Jide Kosoko, a noted Nollywood actor, Adekunle Gold, an Afro-Pop Nigerian artist and Deniji Kosoko-King, a prominent figure known for his commentary on African development and historical narratives.

== In popular culture ==
In 2026, the historical king's life was dramatised in the Yoruba epic film King Kosoko: The Battle for Lagos, directed by Adebayo Tijani and produced by Ayo Ajayi and Segun Olojo-Kosoko. It is scheduled for cinema release on August 28, 2026.
