= Kristin Mann =

American historian and author

Kristen Mann
- Born: September 12, 1946 (age 79)
- Citizenship: American
- Occupations: Historian, author, professor
- Employer: Emory University
- Known for: Works on the history of slavery in Africa
- Awards: Guggenheim Fellowship

Kristin Mann (born September 12, 1946) is an American historian and author renowned for her works on the history of slavery in Africa. In 2002, she was awarded the Guggenheim Fellowships award. She is currently a professor of history at Emory University in Druid Hills, Georgia, United States.

== Selected works ==
- Kristin Mann (December 5, 1985). Marrying Well: Marriage, Status and Social Change among the Educated Elite in Colonial Lagos. Cambridge University Press. ISBN 978-0-521-30701-7.
- Kristin Mann; Richard L. Roberts (January 1, 1991). Law in Colonial Africa. Heinemann Educational Books. ISBN 978-0-85255-602-3.
- Kristin Mann (September 26, 2007). Slavery and the Birth of an African City: Lagos, 1760--1900. Indiana University Press. ISBN 978-0-253-11708-3.
- Kristin Mann (2001). Rethinking the African Diaspora: The Making of a Black Atlantic World in the Bight of Benin and Brazil. Taylor & Francis. ISBN 978-0-7146-8158-0.

== Bibliography ==
- Saliha Belmessous (October 13, 2011). Native Claims: Indigenous Law against Empire, 1500-1920. Oxford University Press. pp. 260–. ISBN 978-0-19-979490-4.
- Lisa A. Lindsay; John Wood Sweet (October 3, 2013). Biography and the Black Atlantic. University of Pennsylvania Press. pp. 321–. ISBN 978-0-8122-4546-2.
