= Akitoye =

Oba of Lagos
- Reign: 1841 - 1845; 1851 - 1853
- Coronation: 1841
- Predecessor: Oluwole 1st term predecessor Kosoko 2nd term predecessor
- Successor: Kosoko 1st term successor Dosunmu 2nd term successor
- Born: Lagos
- Died: Lagos
- Burial: Lagos
- Father: Ologun Kutere
- Religion: Ifá

Akitoye (died 2 September 1853), sometimes wrongly referred to as Akintoye, reigned twice as Oba of Lagos; first, from 1841 to 1845, and a second time, from 1851 to 1853. His father was Oba Ologun Kutere and his siblings were Obas Osinlokun and Adele.

== Ascendancy ==
Oba Oluwole was killed in 1841 when lighting triggered an explosion at the Oba's place. Kingmakers would have invited Prince Kosoko to become Oba but his whereabouts were unknown. Further, a feud between Eletu Odibo and Kosoko prevented the Eletu from ensuring that Kosoko would be king. Consequently, Akitoye (Kosoko's uncle and younger brother to Osinlokun) was installed as Oba of Lagos.

== Akitoye's ouster by Kosoko ==
In an attempt at reconciliation (met with fierce resistance from chiefs, not least Eletu Odibo) with his nephew, Oba Akitoye naively recalled Kosoko to Lagos. Kosoko returned to Lagos aboard the ship of the famous slave trader Jose Domingo Martinez. Akitoye tried to placate Kosoko with gifts and granted him the title Oloja of Ereko or owner of Ereko. Kosoko quickly consolidated his position and found support among many war chiefs and among the Muslim community. Eletu Odibo was concerned about Kosoko's power consolidation and departed for Badagry. In turn, Akitoye recalled Eletu Odibo from Badagry, leading Kosoko to declare that if Eletu Odibo returned to Lagos, he would "make himself king".

A war of words ensued between Oba Akitoye and Prince Kosoko. Kosoko sent his crier around Lagos singing "Tell that little child at court yonder to be careful; for if he is not careful he will be punished". Akitoye, in turn, deployed his crier singing "I am like a pin firmly driven into the ground, which is always hard to root out but ever remains firm". Kosoko retorted "I am the digger who always roots out a pin".

The tensions led to an uprising named Ogun Olomiro (Salt Water War) by the Kosoko faction in July 1845. The Kosoko faction laid siege to the Oba's Palace for three weeks. Akitoye eventually accepted defeat, escaped up the lagoon to the north, and was granted safe passage through the Agboyi Creek by Oshodi Tapa, Kosoko's war captain. Oshodi Tapa explained Akitoye's escape to Kosoko by saying that Akitoye put his enemies in a trance. Akitoye thereafter arrived in Abeokuta where he was granted asylum. Recognizing Akitoye's escape as a threat, Kosoko demanded Akitoye's head from the Egbas who refused Kosoko's demands. In December 1845, the Egbas provided the now deposed Akitoye with an escort to Badagry, the traditional town of refuge for Lagosians where he rallied his followers and built a partnership with European missionaries and with the British through their Consul John Beecroft.

Madam Tinubu and other Akitoye allies fled to Badagry upon Kosoko's accession to the Lagos throne.

== Exile at Badagry, alliance with British, and strategic about-face on slavery ==
After mounting a failed offensive from Badagry to retake Lagos, Akitoye turned to the British, specifically to the Governor of Cape Coast requesting intervention on his behalf in exchange for conforming to British regulation on trade (including abolition).

In December 1850, Akitoye again appealed for British aid:

My humble prayer...is, that you would take Lagos under your protection, that you would plant the English flag there, and that you would re-establish me on my rightful throne at Lagos and protect me under my flag; and with your help I promise to enter into a Treaty....to abolish the Slave Trade...and to establish and carry on lawful trade, especially with English merchants.

== British intervention in Lagos, December 1851 resulting in Akitoye's second term as Oba ==
A confluence of interests in Lagos from the now deposed Akitoye who allied himself with the anti-slavery cause in order to get British support, the Anglican missionaries in Badagry who were in contact with Akitoye, and Egba and European traders who wanted freer movement of goods ratcheted up British intervention in Lagos. Akitoye's anti-slavery position appears born of self-interest considering his connection with the well known slave trader Domingo Martinez who backed Akitoye's unsuccessful attack on Lagos in 1846.

On 26 December 1851, in what is now known as the Bombardment of Lagos or Reduction of Lagos, HMS Bloodhound, HMS Teazer, and a flotilla of boats mounted an attack on the Oba's palace. Kosoko put up a spirited defense but by 28 December 1851, the battle known locally as Ogun Ahoyaya or Ogun Agidingbi (after boiling cannons) was over with Kosoko and his followers fleeing to Ijebu. Consequently, Akitoye was installed Oba of Lagos.

On 1 January 1852, Akitoye signed the Treaty between Great Britain and Lagos abolishing the slave trade.

== Death and legacy ==
Akitoye died on 2 September 1853 and was succeeded by his son, Oba Dosunmu. Dosunmu believed Akitoye was poisoned by Kosoko's loyal chiefs: Oshodi Tapa, Ajenia, and Ipossu. Jean Herskovits raises the possibility that Akitoye may have committed ritual suicide, fitting the traditional pattern of rulers taking their own lives after failing to meet expectations; Akitoye may have realized that his bargain with the British significantly reduced his influence in Lagos.

To commemorate his death, the first ever Eyo procession was held in Lagos. Akitoye's grandson Ibikunle Akitoye reigned as Oba of Lagos from 1925 to 1928.
