= Treaty Between Great Britain and Lagos, 1 January 1852 =

1852 treaty between the United Kingdom and Lagos

The Treaty Between Great Britain and Lagos, 1 January 1852 was an agreement between Great Britain (represented by Commodore Henry William Bruce, Commander of the British Navy's West Africa Station and John Beecroft, British Consul in the Bights of Benin and Biafra) and Oba Akitoye, the newly installed Oba of Lagos. The treaty was signed following British victory during the Reduction of Lagos.

== British anti-slavery measures and naval bombardment of Lagos in 1851 ==
In Britain's early 19th century fight against the Trans Atlantic Slave Trade, its West Africa Squadron, or Preventive Squadron as it was also known, continued to pursue Portuguese, American, French, and Cuban slave ships and to impose anti-slavery treaties with West African coastal chiefs with so much doggedness that they created a strong presence along the West African coast from Sierra Leone all the way to the Niger Delta (today's Nigeria) and as far south as Congo. In 1849, Britain appointed John Beecroft Consul of the Bights of Benin and Biafra, a position he held (along with his governorship of Fernando Pó) until his death in 1854. At the time of Beecroft's appointment, the Kingdom of Lagos under Oba Kosoko was in the western part of the Consulate of the Bights of Benin and Biafra and was a key slave trading port. In 1851 and with pressure from liberated slaves who now wielded political and business influence, Britain intervened in Lagos in what is now known as the Bombardment of Lagos (or Reduction of Lagos). The British installed Oba Akitoye, ousted Oba Kosoko, and signed a treaty on 1 January 1852 between Great Britain and Lagos that outlawed the slave trade, ushering in the consular period in Lagos' history, wherein Britain provided some military protection to Lagos.

== Treaty Text ==
The text of the Lagos Treaty of 1852 is transcribed below:

Commodore Henry William Bruce, Commander-in-Chief of Her Majesty’s ships and vessels on the West Coast of Africa, and John Beecroft, Esquire. Her Majesty's Consul in the Bights of Benin and Biafra, on the part of her Majesty the Queen of England, and the King and Chiefs of Lagos and of the neighbourhood, on the part of themselves and of their country, have agreed upon the following Articles and Conditions:

Article I
The export of slaves to foreign countries is for ever abolished in the territories of the King and Chiefs of Lagos; and the King and the Chiefs of Lagos; and the King and Chiefs of Lagos engage to make and to proclaim a law prohibiting any of their subjects, or any person within their jurisdiction, from selling or assisting in the sale of any slave for transportation to a foreign country; and the King and Chiefs of Lagos promise to inflict a severe punishment on any person who shall break the law.

Article II
No European or other person whatever shall be permitted to reside within the territory of the King and Chiefs of Lagos for the purpose of carrying on in any way the traffic in Slaves; and no houses, or stores, or buildings of any kind whatever shall be erected for the purpose of Slave Trade within the territory of the King and Chiefs of Lagos; and if any such houses, stores, or buildings shall at any future time be erected, and the King and Chiefs of Lagos shall fail or be unable to destroy them, they may be destroyed by any British officers employed for the suppression of the Slave Trade.

Article III
If at any time it shall appear that the Slave Trade has been carried on through or from the territory of the King and Chiefs of Lagos, the Slave Trade may be put down by Great Britain by force upon that territory, and British officers may seize the boats of Lagos found anywhere carrying on the Slave Trade; and the King and Chiefs of Lagos will be subject to a severe act of displeasure on the part of the King and Queen of England.

Article IV
The slaves now held for exportation shall be delivered to any British officer duly authorized to receive them, for the purpose of being carried to a British Colony, and there liberated; and all the implements of Slave Trade, and the barracoons or buildings exclusively used in the Slave Trade, shall be forthwith destroyed.

Article V
Europeans or other persons now engaged in the Slave Trade are to be expelled from the country; the houses, stores, or buildings hitherto employed as slave-factories, if not converted to lawful purposes within three months of the conclusion of this Engagement, are to be destroyed.

Article VI
The subjects of the Queen of England may always trade freely with the people of Lagos in every article they wish to buy and sell in all the places, and ports, and rivers within the territories of the King and Chiefs of Lagos, and throughout the whole of their dominions; and the King and Chiefs of Lagos pledge themselves to show no favour and give no privilege to the ships and traders of other countries which they do not show to those of England.

Article VII
The King and Chiefs of Lagos declare that no human being shall at any time be sacrificed within their territories on account of religious or other ceremonies; and that they will prevent the barbarous practice of murdering prisoners captured in war.

Article VIII
Complete protection shall be afforded to Missionaries or Ministers of the Gospel, of whatever nation or country, following the vocation of spreading the knowledge and doctrines of Christianity, and extending the benefits of civilization within the territory of the King and Chiefs of Lagos.

Encouragement shall be given to such Missionaries or Ministers in the pursuits of industry, in building houses for their residence, and schools and chapels. They shall not be hindered or molested in their endeavours to teach the doctrines of Christianity to all persons willing and desirous to be taught; nor shall any subject of the King and Chiefs of Lagos who may embrace the Christian faith be on that account, or on account of the teaching or exercise thereof, molested or troubled in any manner whatsoever.

The King and Chiefs of Lagos further agree to set apart a piece of land, within a convenient distance of the principal towns, to be used as a burial-ground for Christian persons. And the funerals and sepulchres of the dead shall not be disturbed in any way or upon any account.

Article IX
Power is hereby expressly reserved to the Government of France to become a party to this Treaty, if it shall think fit, agreeably with the provisions contained in Article v of the Convention between Her Majesty and the King of the French for their suppression of the Traffic In Slaves, signed at London, May 22, 1845.

In faith of which we have hereunto set our hands and seals, at Lagos, on board Her Britannic Majesty’s ship Penelope, 1st January, 1852.

(L.S. ) H. W. BRUCE
(L.S. ) JOHN BEECROFT
(L.S. ) KING AKITOYE
(L.S. ) ATCHOBOO
(L.S. ) KOSAE
