= Osinlokun =

Oba of Lagos (r. 1821–29)

- Oba of Lagos
- Reign: 1821 - 1829
- Predecessor: Adele
- Successor: Idewu Ojulari
- Born: Lagos
- Died: 1829; Lagos
- Burial: Benin
- House: Ado, Ologun Kutere
- Father: Ologun Kutere

Oba Osinlokun or Eshinlokun (died 1829) reigned as Oba of Lagos from 1821 to 1829. His father was Oba Ologun Kutere and his siblings were Obas Adele and Akitoye, making the Ologun Kutere Obaship line the dominant one in Lagos. Among Osinlokun's children were Idewu Ojulari, Kosoko, and Opo Olu.

== Ascendancy ==
Around 1820 or 1821, Osinlokun seized on the unpopularity of his younger brother Oba Adele, who was frowned upon for the introduction of the Egun masquerade, which at the time was seen as unbecoming. by forcibly taking the throne in a violent coup. Adele was exiled to Badagry where he assumed headship of the town. While in Badagry, Adele attempted to violently retake the Lagos throne but his efforts were futile.

== Death ==
Osinlokun died in 1829 and was succeeded by his son Idewu Ojulari.
