= Benjamin Campbell (consular agent) =

Benjamin Campbell (1802? – 1859) was a British merchant who served as the first Consular Agent for the Lagos Colony.

Campbell originally settled in the Colony of Sierra Leone and traded in the Nunez River, Guinea. There he was a Member of His Majesty's Colonial Council of Sierra Leone and was thus accorded the title of 'Honorable'. In 1841 papers were found aboard the Segunda Rosario, a ship engaged in the slave trade condemned at the Havana Mixed Commission Court. This raised concerns that Campbell was involved in the slave trade. When Campbell was subsequently investigated, he replied that he had been engaged in trade with Niara Bely (aka Isabela Lightbourn) for sixteen years but only as regards legitimate commodities such as ivory, hides, wax, gold and coffee. Although Mrs Lightbourn also herself engaged in the slave trade, Campbell denied any personal involvement, and indeed claimed that he had suffered personal losses following the destruction of his property on the Nunez River, owing to his opposition to the slave trade.

He was appointed as Consul in Lagos on 21 July 1853 and served in this capacity until his death on 17 April 1859.
