= John Beecroft =

English explorer (1790–1854)

John Beecroft (1790 – 10 June 1854) was an explorer, governor of Fernando Po and British Consul of the Bight of Benin and Biafra.

== Early life ==
Beecroft was born in England near the port of Whitby, Yorkshire. His early life is obscure but while serving on a coasting vessel he is known to have been captured by a French privateer during the Napoleonic Wars in 1805, and held prisoner until 1814. He later joined the merchant navy and as master of a transport vessel traveled to Greenland as part of William Parry's expedition.

== Colonial career ==
In 1829 he was appointed master of works in Fernando Po, an island in the Gulf of Guinea nominally belonging to Spain but which the British were using to establish a base against the slave trade. Demonstrating a talent for negotiating successfully with local people, in 1830 Beecroft was appointed acting governor by Spain (with rank of lieutenant in the Spanish Navy) when Edward Nicolls (then governor) returned to England unwell. Realising Spain was not willing to cede control of the island the British left in 1833 but Beecroft effectively continued in the role of acting governor, even holding a court of justice, although at this point he was also agent of a trading company. In 1843 Spain formally made him governor of Fernando Po and two other Spanish possessions. In 1849 he was appointed Consul of the Bights of Benin and Biafra by the British, a position he held (along with his governorship of Fernando Po) until his death in 1854.

According to K.O. Dike:

In time Africans came to look on the British Consul as the de facto Governor of the Bights of Benin and Biafra. This position of power which Beecroft won for himself passed on to his successors and enabled Britain to enjoy the authority of a protecting power before the Berlin West Africa Conference had legalised the status in international diplomacy.

During his time as governor Beecroft explored the interior of Africa using steamships to navigate far up the Niger River, the Cross River and the Benin River, an area official British expeditions failed to penetrate. The secret of his success was not only his use of modern European naval technology but employing local Africans as crew, since they had greater resistance to the malaria which claimed numerous European lives before the effectiveness of quinine as a protection was understood. After he became consul he assisted in the British bombardment of Lagos in 1851, negotiated (and was a signatory to) the Treaty Between Great Britain and Lagos, 1 January 1852, and was instrumental in the deposition of Pepple, King of Bonny, in 1854.

== Death ==
Beecroft was preparing for another expedition to the Niger River when he died on 10 June 1854 and was buried on Fernando Po. His place on the expedition was taken by William Balfour Baikie. His widow, Mrs. Ellen Beecroft, later received a pension in the Civil List in recognition of her husband's contribution to the suppression of the slave trade and advancement of British interests on the coast of Africa. Beecroft was also survived by three daughters and a son.
