= Oluwole (name) =

Yoruban name common in Nigeria

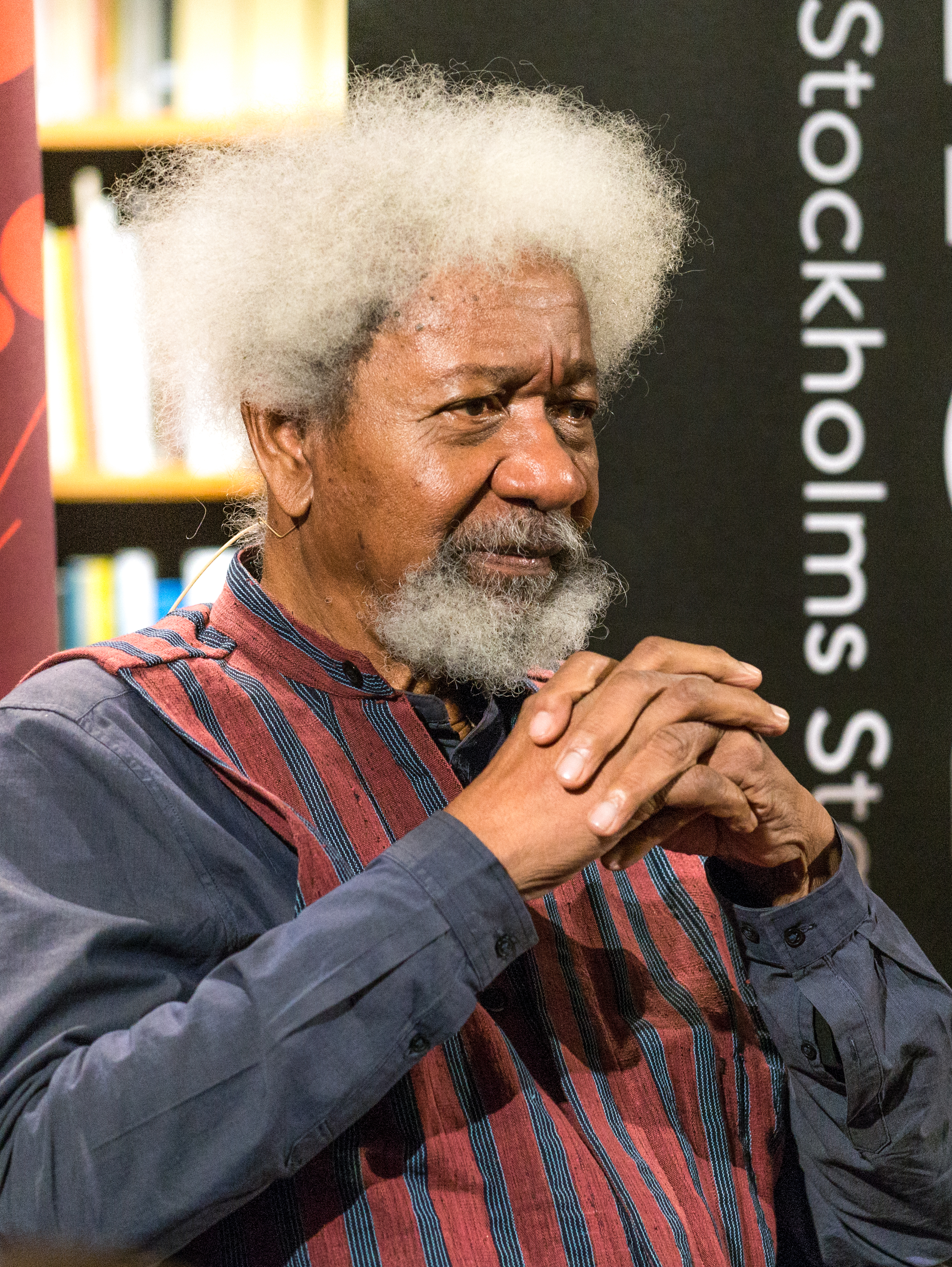
- Wole Soyinka in 2018
- Gender: Male
- Language: Yoruba

Origin
- Origin: Yoruba
- Region of origin: Southwest of Nigeria

Other names
- Variant forms: Olu, Wole

Oluwole // is a common masculine given name and surname of Yoruba origin. It means "the prominent one enters (the house)”.

Notable people with the name include:

== As a name ==
- Christopher Oluwole Rotimi Nigerian Army Brigadier General
- Oluwole Akinyele Agbede Nigerian professor
- Oluwole Olayiwola Amusan Nigerian academic
- Oluwole Soyinka Nigerian playwright
- Oluwole Oluwatosin Nigerian Philosopher
- Oluwole Babafemi Familoni Nigerian Academic
- Oluwole Olumuyiwa Nigerian architect
- Winston Oluwole Soboyejo American scientist
- Timothy Oluwole Obadare Nigerian televangelist
- Oluwatosin Oluwole Ajibade Nigerian singer
- Festus Oluwole Segun Nigerian clergy
- Stephen Oluwole Awokoya former minister of education in Nigeria
- Stephen Oluwole Akinola Nigerian Pentecostal pastor

== As a surname ==
- Isaac Ladipo Oluwole Nigerian medical practitioner
- Oba Oluwole former Oba of Lagos
- Isaac Oluwole Nigerian bishop
- Sophie Oluwole Nigerian philosopher
