= Lagos Market Women Tax Protest (1940–1941) =

The Lagos Market Women Tax Protest took place between 16 December 1940 and 12 January 1941, primarily to reject the Income Tax Ordinance imposed on women in Lagos. The ordinance, issued in March 1940, made it compulsory for women earning less than 50 pounds annually to pay a flat rate of 5 pounds, while those earning above 50 pounds annually would be taxed more. After some months, about 70 women received “return of income” notices.

== Background ==
Before 1940, rumors about the taxation of women in Lagos were circulated widely, especially after taxation issues in the Eastern Provinces had created serious problems.The colonial administration was forced to convene a meeting with six women from faji, Araromi, Ereko, Oko Awo, and Ebute-Ero market to clarify the official position, assuring them that the rumor was false and that women would not be taxed. This meeting, held in 1932 under Major C. T. Lawrence, G.B.E, (Administrator of the Colony of Nigeria), included Lagos leaders such as Chief Oluwa, Chief Obanikoro, Mr. Kadiri Oluwa, and Mr. Yesufu Owo. The market women were represented by Madam Barikisu Iyalode (Faji Market), Madam Alimotu Pelewura (Ereko Market), Madam Comfort Ige (Ebute Ero Market), Madam Efunyinka (Araromi Market), and Madam Laninbun Aduke (Ebute Metta Market).

== Early period ==
On 16 December 1940, over a thousand women marched through Broad Street and Marina in Lagos, demanding the suspension of the Income Tax Ordinance. They argued that since women were denied the right to vote in local government, it was unjust to impose taxation on them. They also called for women's enfranchisement.

At Glover Memorial Hall, over one thousand women gathered, including those from Victoria Garden and surrounding areas, awaiting the arrival of Mr. G.B. Williams M.C, the Commissioner of the Colony accompanied by Mr. F.G. Lloyd, the Deputy Commissioner of Tax and Mr. H.O.B. Denton, the District Officer. Williams argued that the tax was not extraordinary, since women in England also paid income tax, and that it would be unfair for only men to shoulder tax burdens while women with reasonable income were exempt. He explained that only women with substantial income would be affected.

Madam Rabiatu Iyalode (Rabi Alaso) who was the Iyalode and also one of the then vice presidents of Lagos Market Women's association spoke first to confirm the reason they were taxed, because women had never been taxed in Lagos. Then, Alaga Alimotu Pelewura emphasized that their heavy responsibilities made it impossible for them to afford the tax not as an act of defiance, but due to economic hardship. Then, the Commissioner addressed the women to dispel the rumours concerning the subject of taxation, he added that the Government had no intention of imposing poll tax on women but it was time for the women to come into line with rest parts of the world in payment of income tax so he had no power to revoke the ordinance, as it had already been passed by the Legislative Council, He also mentioned that such a payment was demanded only from those whose income tax is above fifty pound while women whose income is below were not liable to tax assessment. But he promised to forward their grievances to the government. Later on, the women proceeded to the Government House to present their petition where two of their leaders was admitted

On 16 of January 1941, the commissioner of the Lagos Colony, wrote a signed reference letter addressing Madam Alimotu Pelewura and Barikisu in response to the petition written on behalf of the Lagos market and trading women on the subject of income tax. The letter revealed that Mr Adeyemo Alakija and Thomas explained that, there were no disapproval from the selected committee members when the bill was passed and they were prohibited from Evaluating the bill. Therefore, he concluded that women ought to pay tax.

In the signed letter by Alimotu Pelewura, leader of Ereko market, and Barikisu, Iyalode of Faji market, it reads as follows: "That in consideration of the foregoing, Your Excellency may be graciously disposed to repeal, or indefinitely suspend the operation, of, the Income Tax Ordinance, 1940 in that part of the enactment which relates to the imposition of a Tax on the Income of Women in Lagos, an institution which is contrary to the traditional custom governing the conduct of the people, and which is an institution fraught with ineluctable eventualities pregnant with perilous consequences which are disproportionate to any political and financial privileges which may be calculated to be derivable therefrom. And Your Excellency's humble petitioners as in duty bound will ever pray."

== Protest actions ==
The organized protest began on 16 December 1940, when women closed markets across Lagos and marched in thousands to the Commissioner's office. Led by Madam Pelewura and other women market leaders, they presented a petition written with the assistance of Herbert Macaulay, leader of the Nigerian National Democratic Party. The petition contained 91 thumbprints from women opposing Governor Bourdillon's refusal to reverse the ordinance.

== Petitions and grievances ==
- The women’s petition, endorsed by Lagos natural rulers, raised several objections:
- The income tax was incompatible with Nigerian Native Law and Custom.
- It contradicted previous government promises not to tax women.
- It was inopportune and revolutionary during a critical period in the history of the British Empire.
- It was inequitable, as ordinary market women lacked economic capacity to pay.
- It was burdensome, since women already paid township rates.
- It was unfair, as African women had no political representation.
- It was vindictive, given women’s lack of purchasing power.
- It was unsociological, since imprisoning women for non-payment would disrupt African family structures.
