= Samuel Crowther =

Samuel Crowther may refer to:

- Samuel Ajayi Crowther (1809–1891), first African Anglican bishop in Nigeria
- Samuel Crowther (journalist) (1880–1947), American journalist, writer and biographer
- Samuel Crowther (priest) (1769–1829), Church of England priest
- Sam Crowther (born 2000), Dutch footballer
