= Mogaji =

- Gender: Male
- Language: Yoruba

Origin
- Origin: Nigerian
- Meaning: Head of a compound.
- Region of origin: South West, Nigeria

Mogaji is a male surname that originated from the Hausa tribe in Nigeria. Its meaning is attached to a cultural significance which means "leader" or "chief or a successor". The designation 'Mogaji' is linguistically equivalent to 'Magaji', with the latter's adoption into the Yoruba language resulting in a subtle phonetic variation. This assimilation has integrated 'Mogaji' as an indigenous Yoruba term with the same meaning "head of a compound". The title Mogaji which means "The Heir" is one of the two routes through which Imams are chosen on a rotational basis in Ibadan.

Notable individuals with the name include:

- Abibatu Mogaji (1916–2013), Nigerian businesswoman
- Binta Ayo Mogaji (born 1964), Nigerian actress
