= The Ilu Committee of Lagos =

The chiefs of Ọ̀tà (Yoruba white cap chiefs) performing rites during the Ijamido festival.

The Ilu Committee of Lagos refers to the traditional white cap chiefs of Lagos. Madam Alimotu Pelewura earned the title after displaying defiance and fighting for the rights of market women.

== Overview ==
Herbert Macaulay mobilized the Ilu Committee, which consisted of Oba of Lagos and traditional chiefs, to resist colonial policies. The Ilu Committee was involved in the Oluwa's Land case, which took place between 1913 and 1920. Abibu Oki, the father of Bankole Oki, the late Nigerian lawyer and Attorney of Lagos State, aligned himself with the Ilu Committee and Herbert Macaulay.

The Ilu Committee played a significant role in Lagos's political society between 1900 - 1950. The Lagos Market Women Association had the support of the Ilu Committee described as Lagosian's way of retaining their Obaship. While Oba remained the chairman, the group was composed of influential and prominent citizens which included politicians, chiefs, nobles, business men and women alongside 26 market women.

In Agege, the four wards, represented by their four senior chiefs, formed the kingmakers of the Ilu Committee of Agege.
