= Modupe Omo-Eboh =

Nigerian lawyer and jurist

- Born: Modupe Omo-Eboh; 1922; Lagos State
- Died: 25 February 2002 (aged 79–80)
- Occupation: A lawyer

Modupe Omo-Eboh (1922 – 25 February 2002) was a Nigerian lawyer and jurist who was the country's first female judge.

== Early life and education ==
Modupe Akingbehin was born in Lagos State in 1922. Her mother was a granddaughter of the Lagos aristocrat Oshodi Tapa and a great-granddaughter of Bishop Samuel Ajayi Crowther, who was himself a descendant of King Abiodun of Oyo. The nationalist Herbert Macaulay was her maternal great-uncle. She attended Queen's College, Lagos before studying law in London.

== Career ==
Omo-Eboh was called to the English bar at Lincoln's Inn on 14 March 1953. She worked as a lawyer, Magistrate, Chief Magistrate, Administrator-General and Public Trustee, Director of Public Prosecutions and Acting Solicitor-General before she became a judge in Benin City on Thursday 13 November 1969, the first woman appointed to the High Courts of Nigeria. In 1976, she was appointed to the Lagos judiciary.

Omo-Eboh died on 25 February 2002.

There is a Justice Modupe Omo-Eboh Street in Lagos named after her.

== Personal life ==
Omo-Eboh's husband was a Justice of the Court of Appeal from Edo State.

== See also ==
- List of first women lawyers and judges in Africa
