= Atiba Atobatele =

Alaafin of the Oyo Empire

- Born: Alaafin Atiba Atobatele; Gudugbu, Oyo Empire
- Died: c. 1858
- Known for: King of the Oyo Empire
- Parent(s): King Abiodun, Eni-olufan

Alaafin Atiba Atobatele was a king of the Oyo Empire. He was the son of Alaafin Abiodun of Oyo, and Eni-Olufan Adegoolu from Akeitan.

Growing up, he was involved in thievery and kidnapping before relocating to the town of Ago and raising a private army. After the death of King Oluewu of Oyo, Atobatele was chosen to rebuild the kingdom and became the Alaafin of Oyo. He formed alliances with powerful war chiefs and implemented social reforms, including the abolition of the tradition of the crown prince having to die with a deceased king. Atobatele died at an old age after celebrating the Bebe Festival, and his son Adelu succeeded him.

== Early life ==
Prince Atobatele was the son of King Abiodun of Oyo, and Eni-olufan from Akeitan, a slave from Gudugbu offered as surety to King Abiodun. Atobatele's childhood friend was Onipede, whose mother was a Gudugbu citizen and a bosom friend of Eni-olufan. Both boys were born in Gudugbu. Not long after the death of his father and the coronation of King Aole in Oyo, he and his mother relocated to Akeitan since they had hatred towards their new king. As he grew up, Atobatele learned tailoring, but he was more interested in the efficiency and reward of thievery and kidnapping. His crime spree caused him to relocate back to Ago. At his new station with his new host named Oja, the Baale of Ago was an accommodating man who, like Atobatele, would not listen despite protests by his younger brother, Elebu. Prince Atobatele raised his private army made up of lawless outlaws and slaves. His military power increased significantly. His brother Elebu became the new Baale of Ago after the death of Oja. His opposition to Atobatele continued, but he was handicapped because Atobatele currently had a positive reputation. As part of the reconciliation process, Shitta of Ilorin, to whom Ago paid tribute, required both Elebu and Atobatele to convert to Islam, and had all children, adults, and seniors in Ago adopt Islamic names.

== Warrior career ==
During the Gbodo War, Elebu drowned in the Ogun River. It was also during the war that the eternal friendship of Prince Atobatele and Onipede, his bosom friend, was broken. No one could see Atobatele except through Onipede. Onipede was constantly treated like a king due to his direct connections to Prince Atobatele, and began to see himself as an equal. The Ilorin army had routed the Yoruba troops. As Atobatele escaped to the other side of the Ogun River from the Baribas' hot pursuit, his horse was shot dead. Onipede dashed past Atobatele, despite his calls for help. Atobatele would have died, but with the help of his uncle Yesufu, he took him on his horse to the other side of the river. A rivalry was established between Onipede and Prince Atobatele. Back in Ago, after the Gbodo enterprise and on Prince Atobatele's order, Onipede was murdered.

After the death of Elebu, Prince Atobatele named Ailumo the Mogaji and himself the administrator of Ago town. At this stage, the headship and rulership of Ago town moved away from Oja, the founder, and his descendants.

== Kingship ==
While Atobatele became the administrator of Ago town, he had a desire to become the next Oyo king. He allied with the powerful war chiefs at the time: Oluyole of Ibadan and Kurunmi of Ijaye. He promised to install both the Basorun and Are-ona-kakanfo, respectively.

After the death of King Oluewu of Oyo in 1835, the Eleduwe War, and the destruction of the old Oyo Empire, it was decided there was a need to install a prince who had the power and wealth to rebuild. The Oyo Mesi sent emissaries to Prince Atobatele. Immediately after his coronation, he immediately reconstituted the kingdom and conferred titles.

Among those was the Basorun title to Oluyole of Ibadan, a descendant of Basorun Yamba. Oluyole's father was Olokuoye and his mother, Agbonrin, daughter of King Abiodun. Therefore, Oluyole was Prince Atobatele's nephew. Oluyole was conferred with the title in Oyo. This was the first time a high chief next to the King would reside outside the kingdom. Are-ona-kakanfo, the Field Marshall of Yoruba armies, was conferred on Kurunmi of Ijaye. He had to go to Oyo to be conferred.

These two high offices next to the Oyo sovereign had their functions delineated as follows:

1. Each would defend all provinces under her control and made efforts to recover lost countries from the Fulanis of Ilorin.
2. An Oyo King would no longer lead war but would be preoccupied with all religions, and civil matters in the Yoruba nation.
3. Ibadan would freely administer towns in the north, north-east of Ijesas, Ekitis, and eastern regions; and protect them against all external aggressions.
4. Ijaye would protect Yoruba towns in the western provinces and carry out military operations against Sabes and Popos.
5. The towns of Iluku, Saki, Gboho, Kihisi, the ancient Oyo, and surrounding towns would be under the direct rulership and administration of the New Oyo.

The Ibadan army became highly successful and an enduring power in Yorubaland. These successes encouraged Basorun Oluyole of Ibadan, and he decided to take the throne of Oyo for himself, replacing Atobatele, the Alaafin of Oyo. However, there were two obstacles. He was a nephew of Atobatele from the female line, which made succession impossible in Yorubaland. The only other obstacle was Kurunmi, the Are-ona-kakanfo, who swore he would never allow the attack on Oyo while he was still alive. Atobatele became aware of Oluyole's intent, so he got Latubosun, a spiritualist to fortify the city against sudden attacks who also resolved to manage Ibadan diplomatically. When attempts to co-op Kurunmi's support did not work including the demand that Kurunmi should come to Ibadan to pay obeisance, an opportunity came when the Ijaye army attacked Fiditi. Asu, the founder sought and got the help of the Ibadan army. This war lasted close to two years until Alaafin of Oyo sent the emblem of the god Sango to both warring parties to cease their sword.

== Social reforms ==
As a result of thousands of slaves captured as spoils of wars, many of them moved to Ibadan from several countries in Yorubaland because of Ibadan's military might and strengths; the town witnessed rapid expansions which required the need for social reforms and laws. In 1858, the Ibadan Council of Chiefs, under the rulership of Balogun Ibikunle, agreed and communicated to King Atobatele, Alaafin of Oyo, for approval. Not only did he approve, but he also adopted these reforms in the new Oyo kingdom and all surrounding Oyo towns.

As a result of the adaptation of the new reforms in Ibadan, Atobatele, the Alaafin of Oyo, was able to replace an old tradition where the Aremo (Crown Prince) had to die with a deceased king.

== Death and legacy ==
King Atobatele died at an old age. He had many children, two of whom later became king: the first child, Adelu (the Crown Prince), and the fourth child, Adeyemi Adedotun. In 1858, King Atobatele decided he would celebrate the Bebe. This festival was celebrated by kings who attained old age and had peaceful reigns, but few kings who had the privilege of celebrating it died almost immediately thereafter. King Atobatele rejected all entreaties not to celebrate the Bebe. The very significance of celebrating Bebe was the only time a living king could visit Bara to perform a certain traditional ceremony, else only on the coronation of a king and when he was interred after his demise. Therefore, announcements were made in all Yoruba countries. Noblemen, priestesses, and Egungun were present. Not long after the Bebe, King Atobatele Atobatele died and Adelu, his son based on the new succession law, was installed as the new Alaafin of Oyo. According to Rev. Johnson, King Atobatele fathered the following princes "Adelu (The Crown Prince), Adelabu, Adesiyen, Adeyemi, Adediran, Adejumo, Olawoyin, Tela Agbojul'ogun, Ala (was of the same mother as Adelabu), Adewusi (was of the same mother as Adelu), Adesetan I, Adeleye, Adesetan II, Adedotun, Afonja, Agborin, Tela Okiti papa, Ogo, Momodu, Adesokan and Adejojo".
