= Abibatu Mogaji =

Nigerian business magnate (1916–2013)

Chief Abibatu Mogaji OON MFR
- Born: 23 October 1916; Lagos, Southern Region, British Nigeria
- Died: 15 June 2013 (aged 96); Ikeja, Lagos, Nigeria
- Citizenship: Nigeria
- Occupation: Business magnate
- Spouse: Alhaji Abdurazak Mogaj
- Children: Bola Tinubu; Arafat Abiodun Kasunmu
- Relatives: Oluremi Tinubu (daughter-in-law)

Chief Abibatu Mogaji OON MFR (16 October 1916 – 15 June 2013) was a Nigerian business magnate and the Ìyál'ọ́jà of Lagos. She was the mother of the president of Nigeria Chief Bola Tinubu.

== Early life ==
Abibatu Mogaji was born on 23rd October 1916, into a respectable Family in Ita Agarawu, Lagos Island Her Father late Pa Gbadamosi Mogaji was a produce merchant while her mother late Alhaja Saadatu Akoya mogaji was also a renowned trader in the old Lagos. She started trading by selling Sierra leone mats with the financial support of her mother. Her interest for trade went further when she became an apprentice under Madam Alimotu Pelewura and became her successor of the Lagos Market Women's Association. There she learnt the foundation of trade and mobilising of women.

== Family ==
Chief Mogaji is the wife of Alhaji Abdurazak Mogaji They had many children of amongst them the leader of All Progressive Congress President Bola Ahmed Tinubu who became president in 2023 and Mrs Biodun Kasunmu. Chief Tinubu's daughter, Folashade, would go on to succeed her grandmother as Ìyál'ọ́jà of Lagos but there is speculation of an older daughter, whoses name is allegedly original Bola, often a female name.

== Political Career ==
Abibatu's political journey started with the formation of the Egbe Omo Oduduwa which was later named Action Group (AG) in alliance with late Chief Obafemi Awolowo with other prominent Yorubas' in the late 40s. This made her known to other political leaders like Herbert Macaulay which made her participated actively in the Nigerian National Democratic party (NNDP). This role gave her the part she played in her subsequent political parties of mobilization of women in the Awo philosophy; the Social Democratic Party (SDP), the Unity Party of Nigeria (UPN), and Alliance for Democracy (AD). Prior to her involvement in mobilisation of women, she was appointed as the Iyaloja of the Association of Nigerian Market Women and Men. She became the vocal leader of the market women's association in Lagos State.

Abibatu received the order of the Federal Republic of Nigeria (OFR) conferred by Olusegun Obasanjo in her developed interest for trading. That was in the day of Madam Efunroye Tinubu.

In recognition of her contributions and efforts to trading and womanhood in Nigeria, Abibatu received other National awards such as the Office of the Order of the Niger (OON) amongst others. She was a matron in several organisations. She also received several honorary doctorate degrees from recognized Nigerian Universities, such as Ahmadu Bello University and the University of Lagos.

== Death ==
Chief Mogaji died at her residence at No.10 Sunday Adigun Street, Ikeja, Lagos, around 6pm on Saturday, 15 June 2013 at the age of 96. She was Buried at Ikoyi Vaults and Gardens in Lagos State. In a written tribute Following her burial her son Asiwaju Bola Ahmed Tinubu celeberated her ninety-six years of legacy as a compasionate leader.

== Awards ==
- Order of the Federal Republic
- Order of the Niger
