= Ijaye =

Town in Oyo state, Nigeria

Orile Ijaye is a small town located in Akinyele local government, Oyo state, Nigeria. It is about 18 miles from Ibadan, Oyo state capital. This town was re-inhabited in 1895, 32 years after it was destroyed due to an intra-ethnic and supremacy war with Ibadan; another military power at that time. The name of the town came from the original name, Ijaye, the name meaning Ijaye city-town.

== History ==
The original occupants of Ijaye, were the Egbas, from the southern Yoruba tribe where they were mainly engaged in agricultural production. Between 1831 and 1833, the Fulani warriors from Ilorin attacked and captured several towns in northern Yorubaland. The displaced refugees from those towns taken by the Fulanis moved towards the south. Among the Oyo refugees who fled were warrior like, chiefs Kurunmi and Dado who led the army from a small town called Esiele. These refugee warriors initially settled at a village called Ika-Odan, which became the abode of many Oyo warriors and generals who refused to acknowledge Ilorin's military authority but awaited the time when they would have the opportunity to defeat the Fulanis and then be able to go back to their various towns. The original inhabitants were displaced.

Since these men were military warriors, they foraged into surrounding village's farms for food. In 1833, those outlaws led by Dado, thereafter, attacked Ijaye town, who were Egba people; and drove away all the original inhabitants. They coveted possessions left behind by the original inhabitants and made Ijaye their permanent homes where they engaged in extensive farming except. Dado would later become unrestrained: he would create false war alarms and had no regard for other war chiefs, until Kurunmi stood up to him and a civil war ensued. Dado with his wives and the small army were driven out of Ijaye. He wandered through several Yoruba towns including, Ibadan. After the death of his friend, Lakanle, an Ibadan war general, he became homeless. He would then return to Ijaye where he was murdered at the instance of Kurunmi.

Kurunmi drove away several war chiefs from Ijaye, who had to move about twelve miles to another village called Akese. Because of the military might under Kurunmi's leadership and easy access to trade and agricultural produce, Ijaye was able to expand rapidly and attracted many refugees. Ijaye became a city-state comparable to Ibadan and Abeokuta. Kurunmi began to form alliances with other military powers as a part of his plots. Ibadan who was led by war general Oluyole were one of these. He led several joint expeditions with Oluyole of Ibadan and both were especially close friends and contemporaries. A few cases of these joint expeditions were: Ibadan in the Gbanamu war against Chief Maye, who had been banished from Ibadan and his allied army; and the Onidese war, when Kurunmi, due to him being envious of the growing importance of the town and its neighbour Ile Ode, requested and got help from Ibadan. Between 1835 and 1836, Kurunmi and his warriors were part of the final Yoruba military coalition in the failed Eleduwe War to take Ilorin back from the Fulani hegemony.

=== Before Ijaye war ===
In 1837, Atiba Atobatele became the new King of Oyo, although the old Oyo had been decimated by the Fulani army of Ilorin. He installed Kurunmi as the Are-ona-Kakanfo or Yoruba Field Marshall; he would function to administer and protect the Yoruba towns in the west, and Oluyole was installed Bashorun or prime minister; he would administer and protect Yoruba towns in the north and northeast. In 1847, Oluyole died. During his lifetime and leadership in Ibadan, the relationship with Kurunmi was mostly cordial and respectful. But it was at that time Ibadan grew and became a military powerhouse; it subdued many towns and villages, and checkmated the Fulani of Ilorin during the Osogbo war. Ibadan leadership became hostile towards Kurunmi. In 1859, Atiba Atobatele died and his son Adelu succeeded him. While the installation of Adelu was supported by Ibadan and many Yoruba kingdoms based on the new social reform approved by Atiba Atobatele before he was deceased, Kurunmi of Ijaye wanted the status quo, customs that stipulated that Adelu should have been made to die with his father. Therefore, Kurunmi refused to recognize the leadership of Adelu.

=== Ijaye war ===
==== 1860 -1862 ====
By 1860, Ijaye had been built into a prosperous military powerhouse by Kurunmi, comparable to Abeokuta and Ibadan. While Kurunmi, who had become a veteran of several wars and an elder statesman, Ibadan had several leaders in successions after the death of Oluyole. By 1860, Chief Olugbode was the Baale of Ibadan (meaning lord or owner of the land). Among his military chiefs were Ibikunle, Balogun (or war general); and Ogunmola, Otun (meaning Right-hand man). The Ijaye war with Ibadan was caused by Ibadan’s attempts to become the sole power in Yorubaland, and Adelu to solidify his rulership in Oyo. An opening to clash with Ijaye arose from a particular incidence. One Abu, a rich lady in Ijanna, a town under Ijaye, died without a will. Her property was supposed to revert to the Alaafin of Oyo, Adelu. When he sent messengers to remove her properties to Oyo, Kurunmi’s war boys attacked the messengers and took them captive. All efforts by Adelu to settle amicably were rebuffed by Kurunmi, so Adelu pleaded Ibadan to declare war on Kurunmi.

On the 10th of April 1860, at the Ibadan council meeting, Balogun Ibikunle, the war general raised the standard of war against Ijaye. Unlike Ibadan with youthful warriors and modern weapons, Kurunmi had put to death several of Ijaye's brave warriors and forbade any chief from acquiring ammunitions to ensure his continuous rulership, so his warriors had to result to fight with bows and arrows. Ijaye received support from towns, such as Egba, Ilorin, and Ijebu who saw Ibadan as the main threat and common enemy given her victories against Ijesa, Ekiti, Akoko, and Igbomina countries. The Ijaye war lasted two years. Ibadan and its allies defeated Ijaye and destroyed the town. In retaliation, Egba and Ijebu attacked and took Remo; Ijebu took Iperu and Egba seized Makun. These effectively closed the two main trade routes to the coast by the Ibadan.

In an attack led by Ogunmola, Otun or right-hand man of Ibadan, at Iwawun, cut off food supplies to Ijaye, through Oke-Ogun towns. Five of Kurunmi’s sons was caught and killed, which dealt him a severe blow. He died in June 1861 and was buried in a secret place by Abogunrin, his head of slaves along with the two slaves who dug his grave. When his burial ground was later found, his head was cut off and taken to Adelu, as the custom for holders of Are-ona-kakanfo or Yoruba Field Marshall title demanded. Abogunrin took over the rulership of Ijaye town and all of Kurunmi’s treasures and properties including war weapons devolved to Abogunrin. He took all civil and military decisions. On the 17th of March 1862, Ijaye fell to the hands of the Ibadan army. Abogunrin and other chiefs escaped to Abeokuta, where they were allocated portions of land to build their tents and houses to re-establish themselves, named Ago Ijaye.

=== Aftermath ===
The vicious war of Ijaye was achieved by massive destruction of farmland, people, and properties; and starvation accomplished by the raised siege on the city town. Ibadan military moved its permanent base to Alabata camp, which later grew into a village. Several Ijaye citizens migrated to the big towns of Ibadan, Abeokuta, Oyo, Lagos, and many other surrounding towns. Many Ijaye migrants who arrived in Ibadan came to join their relatives. Some came as captives and were employed in Ibadan farms or joined the military and were involved in expeditions. Some bought farmland but were excessively taxed. Ijaye refugees in Abeokuta came to meet the ones who had been displaced by Kurunmi in 1833. Those had settled in locations called Ijaye Kukudi and Ijaye Obirinti. The new refugees settled in Sokenu landmarks where they received protection through the Christian missions in Abeokuta. A village called Ijaye-Ojutaye was established as a settlement for Ijaye migrants to Oyo; while those who relocated to a far place in Lagos, settled mostly in Abule-Ijaye around the Agege area.

==== 1870 - 1895 ====
In the 1870s, relations of Kurunmi who were stationed in Abeokuta formed the Ile Are society and another Egbe Agba Ijaye society. The main objective was to re-establish and resettle back in their land. By 1893 they were encouraged by the fact that Ibadan needed bigger farmland for cocoa, cotton, and rubber cash crops for the British.

==== Re-habitation ====
In 1895, Orile Ijaye was established. The early settlers were able to acquire huge land for cocoa farming and would later lease the land to late entrants. In the newly established Orile Ijaye, Kurunmi relations were rejected to lead their monarchical-republican systems and they got support from Ibadan who had to impose a man called Olaniya. When Olaniya was deposed, another man, Fajinmi replaced him. But unlike the thriving Ijaye city-town destroyed by the war, Orile-Ijaye was and has since been a small village under Ibadan’s influence.
