= Erelu =

Erelu is a female chieftaincy title among the Yoruba people. Apart from the office of Iyalode, another office to which any woman could aspire, was that of the Erelu.

== History ==
Among the Egba people of Yorubaland, there is always at least one female member of the Ogboni a.k.a. Osugbo as an organ of traditional governance, called the Erelu, and often, there would be three other assistants called the Otun Erelu (right side erelu), Osi Erelu (left side erelu) and Ekerin Erelu (third to the erelu). These women were selected by the senior Ogboni chiefs based on merit in terms of ability, wealth, leadership and contributions towards the welfare of general society. In Lagos however, the position was traditionally dynastic, and was the only high-ranking female chief appointed by the Oba.

The title of Erelu also exists among market women. The association is divided into two groups, the first being Erelu Oloja, the traditional leader of all market women. In Lagos, she is appointed by the Oba of Lagos through the chiefs and market women leaders. Before colonial administration, the Erelu was a powerful leader who served as the chief executive of the association. Madam Alimotu Pelewura was the first Erelu of Lagos.

In 2019, the Erelu Oodua of Aye Kingdom stated that her position was hereditary rather than honorary and she was an Oba designate. In this role, she promotes cultural heritage, values and traditions while advocating for an improved quality of life and redefining the role of Erelu.

== Title holders ==
- Erelu Kuti (Erelu Kuti of Lagos and Erelu of Egbaland)
- Erelu Abeni Adeleke
- Olusola Obada (Erelu of Ijeshaland)
- Erelu Oodua of Aye Kingdom
- Erelu Angela Adebayo (Non-Executive Director of UBA Group)

== See also ==
- Iyalode
- Iyaloja
- Olori
- Erelu Kuti
- Ogboni
