= Bankole Oki =

Nigerian lawyer

- Born: 1919; Lagos, Nigeria
- Died: 2010
- Occupations: Lawyer; Senior Advocate of Nigeria
- Father: Abibu Oki

Tanimoshe Bankole Oki (c.1919 – 2010) was a Nigerian lawyer who was the Attorney-General of Lagos State from 1973 to 1975. He was a chairman of the Body of Senior Advocate of Nigeria (SAN) and before his death was the oldest SAN.

== Life ==
Oki was born in Agege, Lagos when the community was still a farming village. His father, Abibu Oki was a wealthy trader who held the title of Balogun of Lagos and was aligned with the Ilu Committee in Lagos led the Oba and Herbert Macaulay. His grandfather's background is traced to the town of Ipapo, north of Iseyin. During the Fulani jihad in Oyo, his grandfather, Buraumoh Oki fled Ipapo to finally settle in Lagos where he aligned himself with the Kosoko warring faction. OKi attended St Paul's Primary School, Lagos, then Methodist School, finishing is secondary education at CMS Grammar School, Lagos in 1939. As a secondary school student his interests included athletics in which he was a 1-mile winner at the Lagos Grier Club, in addition, he was also fond of scouting. In 1940, he joined the Nigeria civil service as a third class clerk.

During World War II, he joined the Royal Air Force, beginning in 1943, he spent two years in navigation training completing studies when the war was over but stayed with the RAF until 1947. He earned some grants which enabled him to fund a law education and was called to the bar in late 1950. Oki returned to Nigeria in February 1951 and joined the chambers of H.O. Davies but in 1953, after leaving the civil service a decade earlier, he returned and took a principal counsel position in the Legal Department. From 1953 to 1959, he worked in Ibadan in an official role returning to Lagos in November 1959. In 1960, when a request was made by Tafawa Balewa to the expatriate attorney-general for a legal practitioner with military background to work with the UN force in Congo, Oki was recommended. He spent a year and a half in Brazzaville in the legal office of the UN peace keeping force.

Oki served as Commissioner for Boundary Settlement in Western State and later commissioner of justice in Lagos state. In 1978, he was given the SAN title.
