= Stanley Macebuh =

Nigerian scholar and journalist (1942–2010)

- Born: 28 December 1942
- Died: 7 March 2010 (aged 67); Abuja, Nigeria
- Education: King's College, Lagos; University of Sussex
- Occupations: Scholar, journalist

Stanley Macebuh (28 December 1942 – 7 March 2010) was a Nigerian scholar and journalist.

== Biography ==
Macebuh was born on 28 December 1942, and he attended Ngwa High School and King's College, Lagos, the former under a scholarship. Between 1963 and 1966, he studied English at the University of Ibadan. Beginning in 1967, he studied at the University of Sussex, because of which he was in England through the duration of the Nigerian Civil War.

Macebuh graduated from Sussex at age 26, with a Doctor of Philosophy. After graduating, he joined the faculty of the University of California, Berkeley as a philosopher. He was a lecturer for the City College of New York and Columbia University, simultaneously. He also taught at King's College. In 1977, after journalist Patrick Dele-Cole requested Macebuh join the Daily Times as Editorial Adviser, he returned to Nigeria, alongside Dele Giwa. He later joined the staff of The Guardian. He left the newspaper and established the publications Sentinel Magazine and the Post-Express, though his beliefs conflicted with investors. In 1999, he was appointed Senior Special Assistant to President Olusegun Obasanjo.

Macebuh died on 7 March 2010, aged 67, in National Hospital, Abuja.
