= Kurunmi =

19th-century Yoruba military leader and Aare Ona Kakanfo

- Born: Oyo Empire
- Died: 1861; Ijaiye, present-day Oyo State, Nigeria
- Other names: Are Kurunmi; Aare Ona Kakanfo Kurunmi
- Occupations: Military commander; ruler of Ijaiye
- Known for: Leading Ijaiye in the Ijaiye War against Ibadan (1860–1862)
- Title: Aare Ona Kakanfo

Kurunmi (died 1861), also known as Are Kurunmi, was a Yoruba military commander and the Aare Ona Kakanfo, or Generalissimo, of the Oyo Empire in the mid-nineteenth century. He ruled Ijaiye, a town situated on the road between Ibadan and Iseyin in what is now Oyo State, Nigeria, and was regarded as one of the most powerful military figures in Yorubaland during his era. His refusal to recognise Adelu as successor to Alafin Atiba following the latter's death in 1859, on the grounds that the installation contravened established Oyo custom, precipitated the Ijaiye War, a conflict in which Ijaiye was defeated by the combined forces of Ibadan and its allies between 1860 and 1862. All five of his sons died in the war. He has since been the subject of substantial historiographical attention and is the central figure in the 1971 play Kurunmi by Nigerian dramatist Ola Rotimi and the play Ijaye by Wale Ogunyemi.

== Background and rise to power ==
Ijaiye was founded in approximately 1785 and lay on the road between Ibadan and Iseyin. Following the sack of Old Oyo by the Fulani forces in 1831 and the subsequent restoration of New Oyo under Alafin Atiba Atobatele, who came to the throne in 1837, Yorubaland was reorganised around a series of militarily powerful successor towns. Atiba appointed Kurunmi as Aare Ona Kakanfo, the highest military title in the Oyo state system, while appointing Oluyole as Bashorun of Ibadan. As Kakanfo, Kurunmi was by custom required to reside outside the capital and made Ijaiye his headquarters.

Missionary accounts from the period describe Ijaiye under Kurunmi as a town of considerable size and economic activity. The Reverend Henry Townsend, who visited in 1852, estimated the population at approximately 40,000 and described the market as the finest he had encountered in Africa. Missionary R. H. Stone, who was resident in Ijaiye for six years from 1859, estimated the population at approximately 100,000 and noted that trade caravans from the interior met those from the coast at the town's market. Stone described Kurunmi as "haughty, despotic, ambitious and cruel" while also noting that he was "firm, just and reasonable on most occasions." Townsend, writing in 1852, noted that while Kurunmi professed opposition to theft and kidnapping, he compelled trade caravans by armed force to pass through Ijaiye so that he could collect a toll of 200 cowries per load.

Contemporary missionary and historical sources indicate that Kurunmi's compound covered approximately eleven acres and contained storage rooms, accommodation for an estimated 300 wives and 1,000 slaves, and a large enclosed space used for public trials and executions.

== Dispute over the succession of Adelu ==
By Oyo custom, the eldest son of a deceased Alafin was required to die alongside his father. When Alafin Atiba was approaching death, he summoned his principal chiefs and instructed them to install his son Adelu as his successor, departing from this established practice. Ibadan accepted the instruction. Kurunmi refused, on the ground that the installation of Adelu violated the constitutional order of Oyo. When Atiba died in 1859 and Adelu was duly crowned, Kurunmi declined to attend the installation ceremony or to pay homage to the new Alafin.

A series of incidents subsequently sharpened the dispute between Kurunmi and Adelu. When a woman at Ijanna, a town subordinate to Ijaiye, died without heirs, Adelu sent representatives to collect the estate, as was the entitlement of the crown under custom. Kurunmi ambushed the Alafin's party at Jabata, killed a number of them, and took 240 as captives whom he declared slaves. When Adelu sought their release and offered payment, Kurunmi demanded twice the rate offered. Adelu paid the increased sum. Entreaties from Balogun Ibikunle of Ibadan and other Yoruba chiefs failed to persuade Kurunmi to alter his position. Adelu subsequently sent emissaries bearing the edan ogboni, a symbol of peace, alongside gunpowder representing war, inviting Kurunmi to choose between the two. Kurunmi killed all but one of the emissaries and returned the ogboni symbol to Adelu, effectively choosing war.

== The Ijaiye War ==
The war that followed involved not only Ijaiye and Ibadan but drew in a range of other Yoruba states. The Egba allied with Ijaiye against Ibadan, as did the Ijebu and a Fulani contingent. Ibadan was led in the field by Balogun Ibikunle and Basorun Ogunmola. An additional dimension of the conflict was a long-standing personal grievance: Ogunmola had previously been captured by Kurunmi, held captive at Ijaiye, and fed on ashes during his detention.

Ibadan forces encamped on the bank of the River Ose, approximately thirteen miles from Ijaiye. The Ibadan army employed drum signals used by Ijaiye troops to draw Ijaiye soldiers across the river, where they were ambushed. Kurunmi's eldest son, Arawole, was killed in this engagement and his severed head was sent to Kurunmi. The Egba forces subsequently withdrew from the battlefield without informing Kurunmi, leaving Ijaiye without its principal ally.

Ibadan also cut off Ijaiye's supply routes, including access to Iwawun, its principal source of food and water. The blockade was reinforced by British commercial interests, which provided Ibadan with access to modern firearms through trade routes via Lagos, while restricting Ijaiye's access to the same. By 1862, the combination of military defeat, the loss of all five of Kurunmi's sons in the war, famine, and the collapse of allied support had rendered Ijaiye unable to continue resistance. The war concluded with the destruction of Ijaiye as a political entity.

== Death ==
The precise circumstances of Kurunmi's death remain uncertain. One account holds that he died by suicide through the ingestion of poison, having concluded that continued life held no purpose after the deaths of all his sons and the defeat of his town. A further account recorded in local oral tradition holds that he died in his house following the conclusion of the war and was buried near the River Ose, with three slaves interred alongside him in accordance with custom. A third account suggests he died in battle and was returned to Ijaiye for burial. No confirmed burial site has been identified. According to one account preserved in oral tradition, only his daughter, Iyagbogbo, knew the precise location of his grave.

== Legacy and commemoration ==
Ijaiye, referred to in some sources as Orile Ijaiye, remains a small agrarian town in Oyo State. Residents and historians of the area have noted the deterioration of monuments and relics associated with Kurunmi and the war, including the shrines at his compound and inscribed memorial stones at Ijaiye High School, which were reported in 2013 to have faded to the point of near-illegibility. A monument to Kurunmi and a separate monument to Reverend Thomas Bowen, the Baptist missionary who established the first Baptist church in Nigeria at Ijaiye in 1854, stand at the school premises.

The masquerade regalia associated with Kurunmi, said to include carved wooden masks and the skulls of animals, has been maintained through inheritance by members of the Kurunmi lineage. As of 2013, the material was reported to be in the custody of Tijani Salami, who stated it had been passed down through successive custodians since the warrior's death.

Kurunmi is the central figure in two significant works of Nigerian dramatic literature: Kurunmi by Ola Rotimi, first published in 1971, and Ijaye by Wale Ogunyemi, both of which reconstruct the events of the Ijaiye War using documented historical figures and events.
