= Dandeson Coates Crowther =

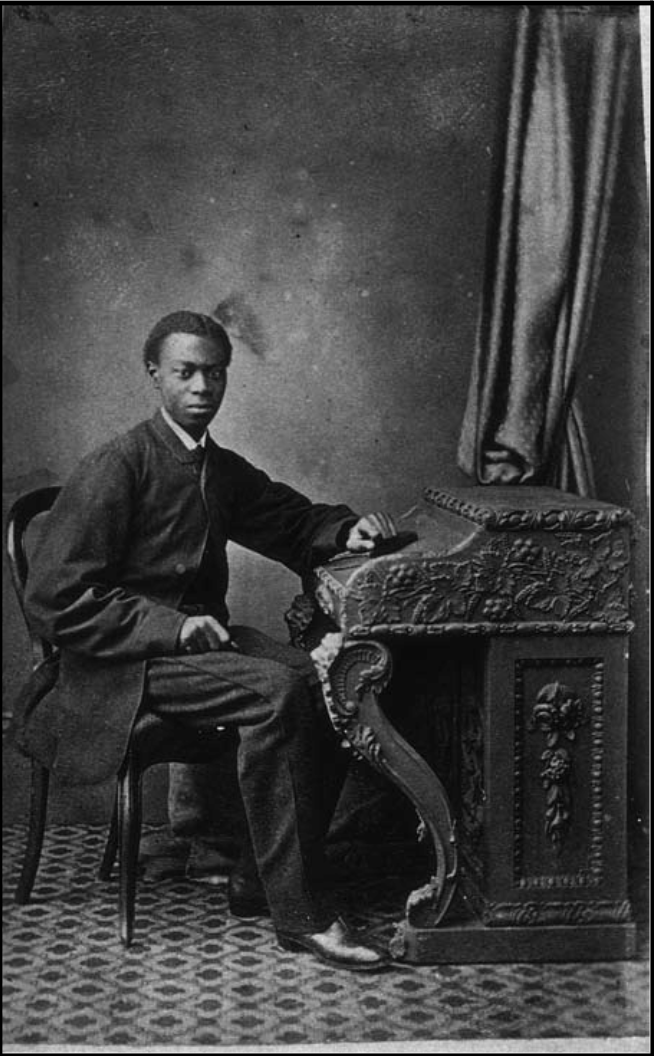
Dandeson Coates Crowther

Dandeson Coates Crowther KBE (24 September 1844 - 5 January 1938) was a leader of the Anglican Church in West Africa. He was born in Sierra Leone. He was a part of the Christian Missionary Society (CMS) in 1870 and titled as "Archdeacon" of the Niger Delta in 1876. He is credited with initiating the "mass movement" towards Christianity in the 1870s and ultimately the first African secession from the Anglican Church when he founded the Niger Delta Pastorate. He was ordained at Saint Mary's Parish Church by Samuel Ajayi Crowther. Prior to this role, he was Senior Pastor in Bonny, Niger Delta.

== Early life and education ==
Dandeson Coates Crowther was the youngest son of Samuel Ajayi Crowther, who was the first African Anglican Bishop in Nigeria.

Crowther was educated in Sierra Leone, Nigeria, and England. He attended the Christian Missionary Society Grammar School located in Lagos, Nigeria in 1860. He then relocated and attended the Christian Missionary Society College in Islington, London, graduating in 1863. He received a Doctorate of Divinity in Lambeth in 1921.

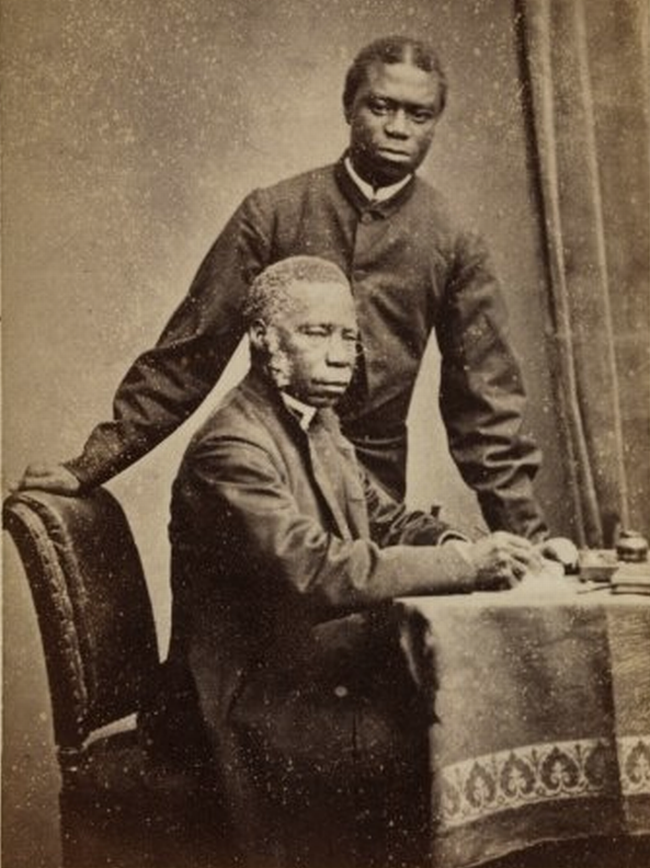
Dandeson, with father Samuel Ajayi Crowther

== Mission ==
Crowther's journey as a missionary began in 1870 after he was ordained by his father. On 19 June 1870, he became a deacon at Saint Mary's Parish Church in Islington, London. He returned to the Niger Delta in 1871 to join the Christian Missionary Society Niger Mission. On 12 March 1871, he became a priest in Lagos, Nigeria. He remained at Bonny Island, Rivers State, Nigeria until becoming Archdeacon of the Niger Delta in 1876. He was Archdeacon, often called "venerable," of the Lower Niger and Delta stations, and led the Southern Nigeria Province of the Christian Missionary Society Mission.

Crowther frequently travelled across continents, utilizing shipping lines between Great Britain and West Africa, such as the Elder Dempster Line. He constantly travelled between London and Nigeria, but when he got sick, he traveled to Freetown, Sierra Leone.

Crowther struggled throughout his mission as some of the leaders of the Christian Missionary Society did not want any non-native Europeans to run the Mission. The backlash against African-born clergymen skyrocketed after the Niger Crisis of 1890 and led to the death of Samuel Ajayi Crowther in 1891. Letters written by Dandeson Coates Crowther express his realization of people attempting to kick him out of the Christian Missionary Society. He concluded his role as Archdeacon of the Niger Delta in 1926. In 1935, he was awarded the Order of the British Empire, being knighted by the King of England, although as an ordained clergyman, he refrained from using the pre-nominal "Sir." He died on 5 January 1938 in Freetown, Sierra Leone.

== Legacy ==
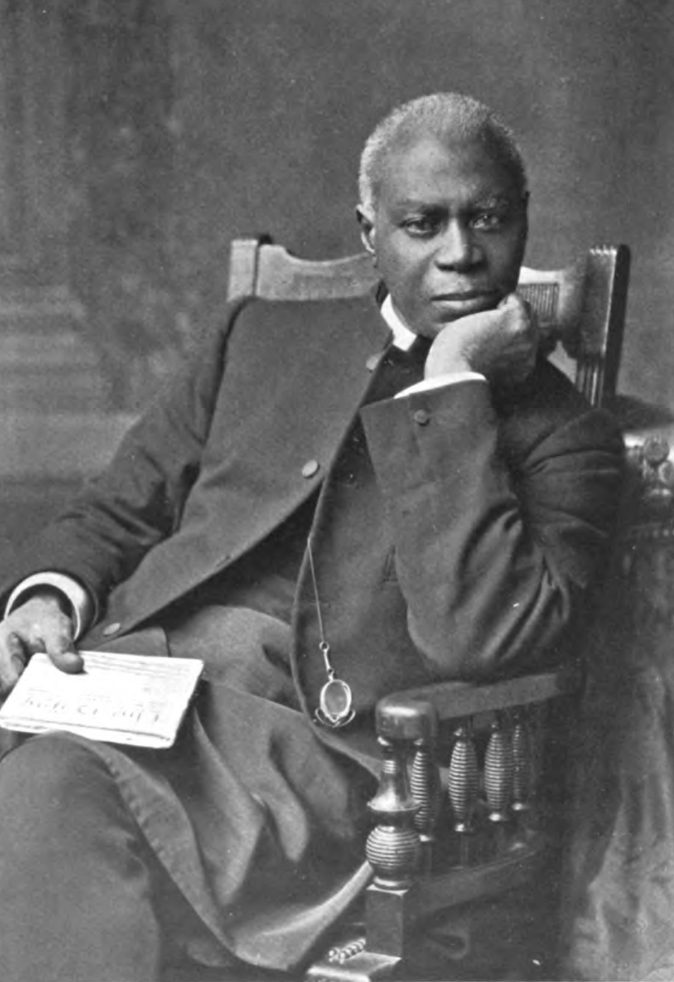
Archdeacon Dandeson Coates Crowther

Crowther was involved in the Delta Revolt and often fought for Africans to run their continent without the sole reliance on Europeans. The Niger Delta separated from the Christian Missionary Society after Crowther advocated for a self-governing African church, establishing the Niger Delta Pastorate in 1892. He translated the Anglican Book of Common Prayer, "Dusk to Dusk," into Igbo. He also translated a portion of the book of Jeremiah of the Bible into Yoruba.
