= Thomas Babington Macaulay (Nigeria) =

Yoruba priest and educator

- Born: 17 January 1826; Kissy, Sierra Leone
- Died: 17 January 1878 (aged 52); Lagos, Lagos Colony
- Resting place: Ajele Cemetery
- Known for: founder of first secondary school in Nigeria
- Spouse: Abigail Crowther (m. 1854)
- Children: Herbert Macaulay
- Parents: Ojo-Oriare (father); Kilangbe (mother)
- Relatives: Oliver Ogedengbe Macaulay (grandson); Samuel Ajayi Crowther (father-in-law)

Thomas Babington Macaulay (17 January 1826 – 17 January 1878) was a Nigerian priest and educator. He was the first principal and founder of CMS Grammar School, Lagos, and father of Nigerian nationalist Herbert Macaulay.

== Life ==
Thomas Babington Macaulay was born in Kissy, Sierra Leone, on 17 January 1826 to Yoruba parents who were liberated by the British West Africa Squadron from the Trans Atlantic Slave Trade. His father was Ojo-Oriare from Ikirun in old Oyo Province (now Osun State), while his mother was Kilangbe from Ile-Ogbo, also in Oyo Province. Macaulay trained at CMS Training Institute, Islington, and King's College, London. He was a junior associate of Bishop Samuel Ajayi Crowther, whose second daughter, Abigail, he married in 1854. That same year, Macaulay was ordained by bishop Owen Vidal in Lagos with Thomas King, and were the first Africans admitted to the ministry of the Anglican Church upon their own soil.

== Death ==
Macaulay died on his birthday (17 January 1878) from smallpox in Lagos and was buried at Ajele Cemetery.

Babington Macaulay Junior Seminary, a co-educational boarding school in Ikorodu, Lagos, is named after him.
