= Cândido da Fonseca Galvão =

Brazilian military officer and nobleman (1845–1890)

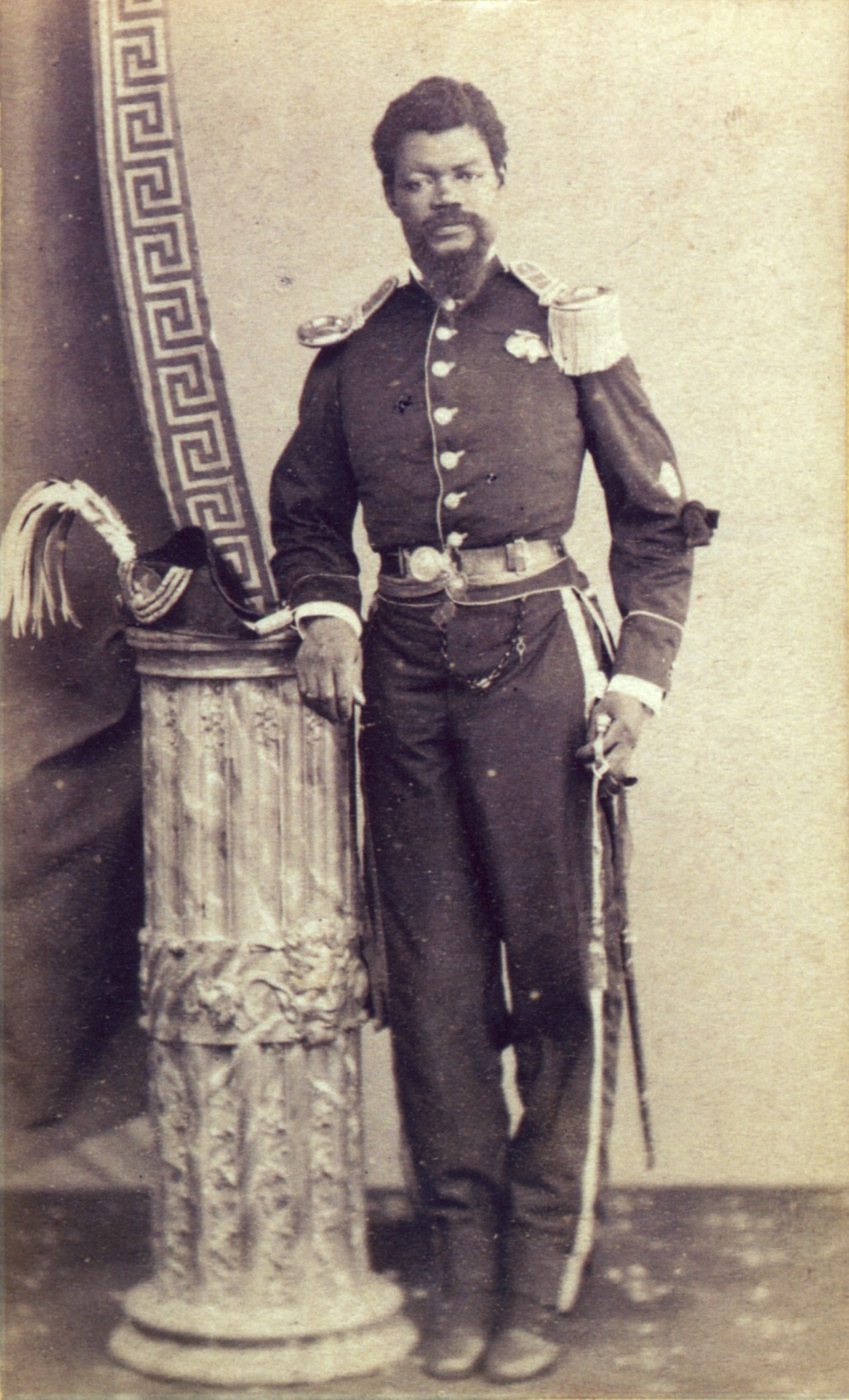
- Born: 26 January 1845; Lençóis, Bahia, Empire of Brazil
- Died: 8 July 1890 (aged 45) Rio de Janeiro, Rio de Janeiro, Brazil
- Allegiance: Empire of Brazil
- Branch: Imperial Brazilian Army
- Rank: Alferes
- Conflicts: Paraguayan War

Cândido da Fonseca Galvão, also known as Dom Obá II D'África (1845–1890), was a Brazilian military officer and nobleman. A grandson of the Obá Abiodun of the Oyo Empire, he held the title of Omoba among the Yoruba people of West Africa. Galvão’s father, Benvindo, was freed on an unknown date in the first half of the nineteenth century. Upon his freedom, he sought to take advantage of the emerging Lençóis diamond rush in north eastern Brazil. Evidence suggests that he arrived around the year of 1845, although there are no birth certificates to corroborate, it is estimated his son Cândido da Fonseca Galvão was born shortly after.

== Enlistment Campaign ==
Galvão enlisted into the Brazilian military in 1865 as a freedman to fight for his home country in the upcoming war against Paraguay revolving around territorial disputes. However Galvão did not enlist alone, he arrived as the leader of a group of 30 fellow freedmen he had convinced to join the war alongside him. Although there was no mandatory draft in the state of Brazil, the war offered the opportunity to cease to be cheap labour for former slaves, and many took advantage. Galvão demonstrated signs of strong leadership skills in the early months of the formation of the Brazilian army, this quality earned him the promotion to Sergeant on May 1, 1865. He was then to lead the whole contingent of 230 volunteers to the provincial capital. The contingent from Lençóis was formally inducted into the III Volunteer Corps, under command of Lieutenant Colonel Domingos Mundim Pestana of the National Guard, before being officially designated the 24th Volunteer Corps. The 24th Volunteers were a Zuavo battalion, who adopted tactics and uniform from the Zouave regiments of the French African Army. The Bahian Zuavos were a spectacle in the Brazilian army, mostly noted for their elaborate uniforms and their black officers.

With their fighting force already complete, early in the summer of 1865 the Third company of Zouaves moved quarters from Quartel da Palma to the Arsenal da Marinha, but were without a sublieutenant, as the incumbent had been dismissed by the acting vice-president as a result of an attempted power play. This left a vacancy, and with the war looming, the Vice-President elected Cândido da Fonseca Galvão to fill the role of Sublieutenant of the 3rd Bahian Company of Zouaves.

June 17, of 1865 the corps marched to the archbishop's palace to receive a blessing from the President of the province before sailing south on the English Steamship Saladin. They were received 6 days later in Guanabara Bay, the heart of the Brazilian empire. In the month the troops were quartered at Campo Da Aclamação, Galvão had his first encounter with the emperor, Pedro II, before they began their 9 month march towards enemy territory.

=== Battle of Tuiuti ===
May 24, 1866, the greatest battle in the history of South America took place between the allied forces of Brazil, Argentina, and Uruguay and the army of Paraguay, located in Tuiuti, Paraguay. The alliance forces stood 32,000 strong and the Paraguayan troops reached numbers approximated at 30,200. The battle lasted merely 5 hours of intense close quarters warfare on swampy grounds that resulted in roughly 9,000 dead combined from both sides. Sublieutenant Galvão’s volunteers corps lost 152 men alone. The allied forces emerged victorious, but due to extreme casualties were unable to take any immediate advantage of their victory and remained in the same location for the following two years, engaging in minor battles and skirmishes.

Individual roles in combat are sparsely documented, but there are records of contemporary Melo Moraes Filho referring to statements made by the Zouaves volunteers regarding Galvão, “the Prince’s faith in his office was pure and praiseworthy”, and that “in all the battles fought against the armies of the dictator López, he was always in the vanguard, fighting with tenacity and courage”.

As of August 31, 1866, and the war all but decided, Sublieutenant Galvão was invalided out of the campaign due to a wound he suffered on his right hand. Two weeks later, the 24th Corps was disbanded and the few soldiers who remained were transferred to other units for the conclusion of the war until the death of Solano López.

== Homecoming ==
Upon Cândido da Fonseca Galvão’s return to Rio de Janeiro, he was ordered back to his native province of Bahia. This began his fight for social recognition of his efforts and merits for his service in the war, and opened the channel of communication between himself and the emperor, “I come to you today as a supplicant who has not received any of the benefits awarded to those who, like himself, offered their services in the defence of the beloved Homeland; I come to humbly implore Your Majesty to grant this subject the honorary title of his rank and award a commemorative Campaign Medal”.

A difficult path ensued to earning the honor due to the fact that the Adjutant General’s Office required, under Order of the Day no. 52, an affidavit ‘detailing the relevant services rendered during the Paraguayan campaign’. Galvão was unable to produce said affidavit, because ‘the house in which he had resided in the town of Lençóis had caught fire and burnt to the ground with all its contents’. The stalemate was resolved a year later by Order of the Day no. 880, issued on September 30, 1872, which declared, ‘the honours of the rank of army sublieutenant is granted to the former commissioned sublieutenant of the 3rd Company of Bahian Zouaves, Cândido da Fonseca Galvão, in recognition of his services during the war against Paraguay’.

In the following years Galvão sought for fair compensation and opposed the unjust treatment he and fellow war veterans received upon their arrival home. Like many others, Galvão struggled to assimilate back into civilian life, and evidence in the immediate post-war period suggested that the sublieutenant battled alcohol abuse and potential mental illness, which ultimately led to multiple arrests, the first documented in May 1876.

=== Rio de Janeiro ===
Cândido da Fonseca Galvão traveled back to Rio de Janeiro in the latter half of 1879, marking the beginning of his relevance in Brazilian politics and thus the formation of his relationship with the emperor, Pedro II. Galvão was present at every single audience that was held by the emperor from June 17, 1882, until December 13, 1884, 125 visits in total. Galvão was a colorful individual, never missing the opportunity to make his presence known. A story had been told that a military guard at the Imperial Palace once failed to salute the Prince with due military ceremony, and the Prince understood he had a right to correct formalities. So he proceeded to demand at the top of his voice that they perform the neglected military honours. Such a scene was made that he was threatened with imprisonment, however, Emperor Pedro II stepped in and resolved the matter by instructing Galvão shall receive these formalities moving forward. This notwithstanding, the Prince was a man of the people; witnesses provided testimony of him providing a common sentry with a $2,000 note for greeting him with an elaborate military flourish. In Galvão’s relationship with the emperor, he serves as a representative of Little Africa, the home to the brown skinned and black, who were ignored and under-represented, and only recognized for the problems which they often caused. The Prince served to change these relations, and did so through his relationship with the Emperor.

May 13, 1888, the imperial family passed “The Golden Law”, making Brazil the last nation in the western hemisphere to abolish slavery. The years leading up to the abolition caused major political turmoil in regards to how to adjust the national economy, and the new wave of workers that were required in order to keep the nation afloat. Galvão took to the streets in an attempt to push his ideas to the public of creating political ties with the West Coast of Africa, and encourage the immigration of free blacks to perform the work required on the soon to be laborless plantations. However, that notion had been brought up on multiple occasions in the past, and was commonly viewed that such a move would be ‘regarded, and treated, as a covert renewal of the slave trade’, and based on Galvão’s writing, it seemed he was unaware of the previous considerations.

== Legacy ==
Cândido da Fonseca Galvão, popularly known as ‘The Prince of the People’, was an exuberant individual who advocated strongly for veterans, underrepresented people of color, and his country. Through his spirit and persistence he formed a working relationship with the beloved emperor Pedro II, and used the platform in which he created to push the agenda that he believed would bring prosperity and good health to those who had been previously ignored. Upon his death, on July 8, 1890, on the Rua Barao de Sao Felix, he made the front page of Rio’s newspapers. Nearly every article published about him from the time of his death all the way up to 1918 emphasized his ‘enormous tribes of followers’, or his ‘immense popularity’ in the city of Rio de Janeiro.[18] Galvão represented what was previously uncommon in the 19th century, an African freedman of respected social status, flaunting extravagant dress, and interactive relationships with the poorest of Little Africa to the emperor of the entire nation. Galvão demanded respect as a black man of African descent, and paved the way for many more to follow suit in years to come in Brazil.

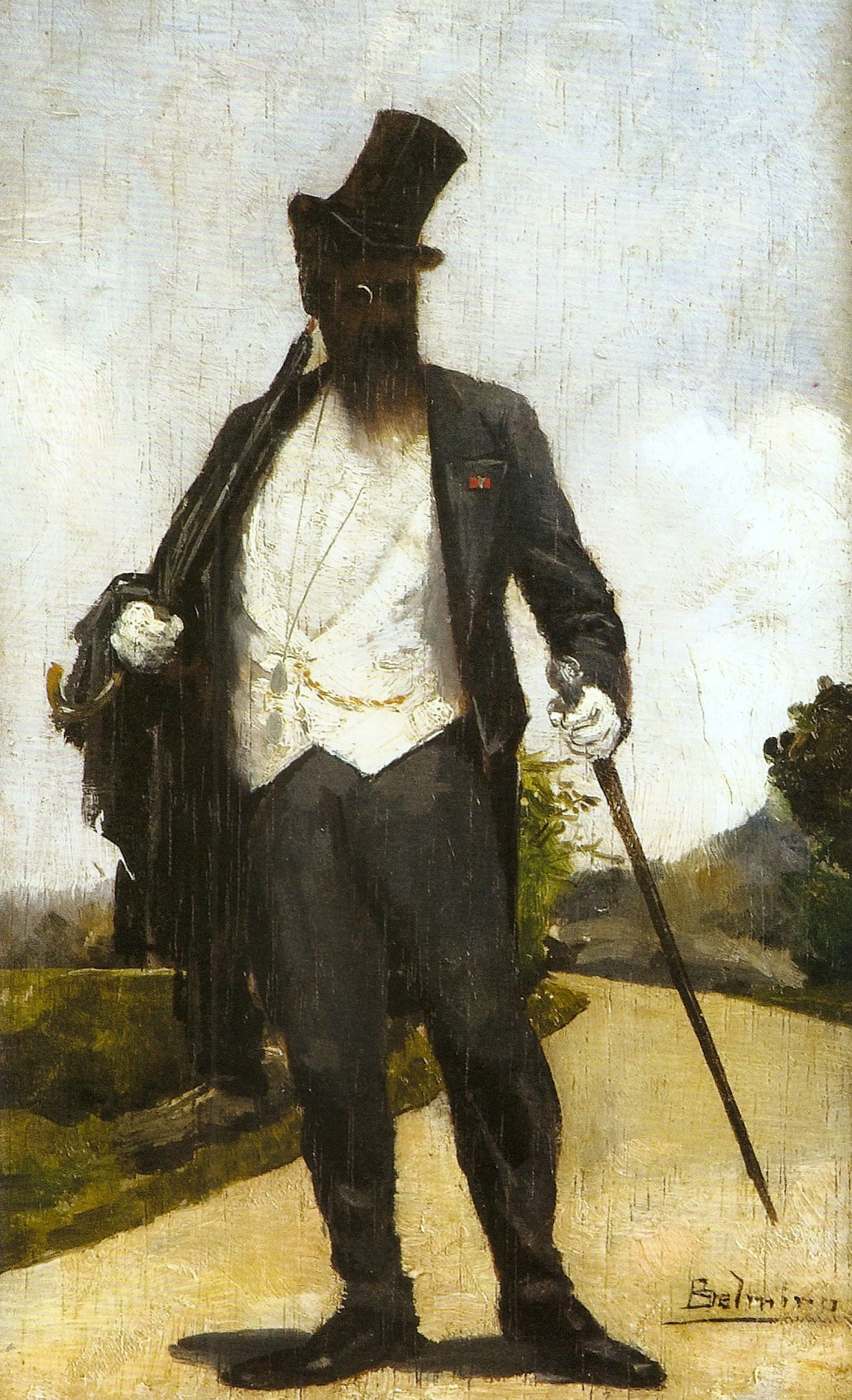
An artist's depiction of Galvão in his usual but elegant attire. Painted in 1886.

== Sources ==
- Eduardo, Silva. Prince of the People: The Life and Times of a Brazilian free man of colour. Translated by Moyra Ashford. London; New York: Verso, 1993.
