= Ikoyi Cemetery =

Cemetery in Lagos, Nigeria

Coordinates: 6°27′05″N 3°24′42″E

Ikoyi Cemetery is one of many landmarks located in Ikoyi, part of the Eti Osa local government area of Lagos state, Nigeria. Many prominent Nigerians such as Herbert Macaulay are interred at Ikoyi Cemetery.

== Maintenance problems ==
Ikoyi Cemetery has recently fallen into disrepair with efforts by the Eti Osa local government to have private sector participation in the upgrade and upkeep of the cemetery. There is also the issue of space for the diseased as some dead bodies are buried in spaces were other dead bodies have been buried before.

== Notable burials ==
- Herbert Macaulay
- Henry Carr
- Candido Da Rocha
- Orlando Martins
- Onyeka Onwenu
