= Mobolaji Johnson =

Nigerian general and Military governor of Lagos State from 1967 to 1975

Brigadier General Mobolaji Olufunso Johnson
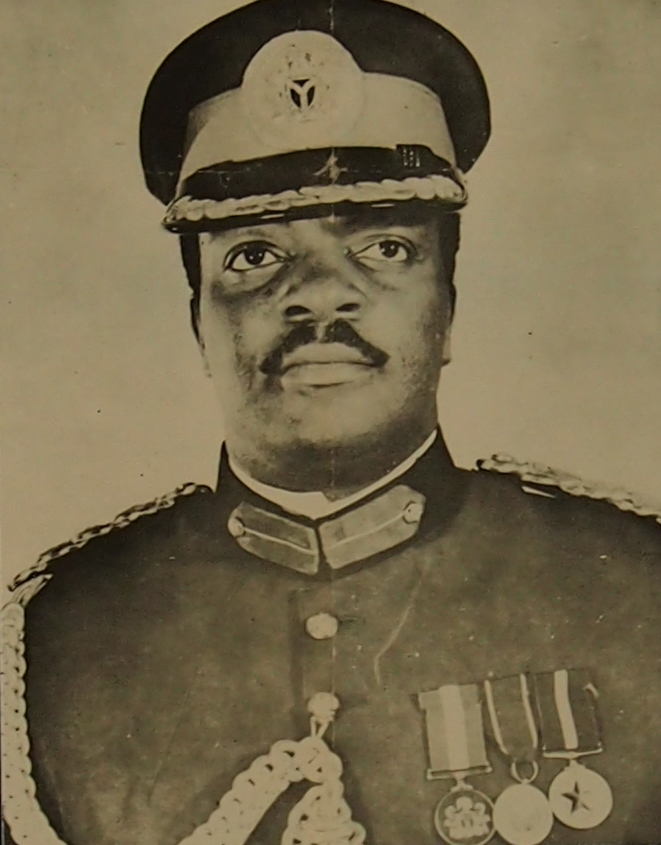

Military Governor of Lagos State
- In office 28 May 1967 – July 1975
- Preceded by: position established
- Succeeded by: Adekunle Lawal

Personal details
- Born: 9 February 1936 Lagos, British Nigeria
- Died: 30 October 2019 (aged 83)
- Education: Reagan Memorial Baptist School; Methodist Boys' High School Lagos; Mons Officer Cadet School; R.M.A Sandhurst

Military service
- Allegiance: Nigeria
- Branch/service: Nigerian Army
- Years of service: 1959–1975
- Rank: Brigadier

Mobolaji Olufunso Johnson (9 February 1936 – 30 October 2019) was a Nigerian Army brigadier who served as military administrator of the federal territory of Lagos from January 1966 to May 1967 during the military regime of General Aguyi-Ironsi (to July 1966, and General Gowon subsequently), and then as the first governor of Lagos State from May 1967 to July 1975 during the military regime of General Yakubu Gowon. As governor, his administration supervised the demolition of the Ajele Cemetery in the early 1970s, which attracted public criticism.

== Early life and education ==
Johnson was born to the family of Joshua Motola Johnson and his wife, Gbemisola Johnson (née Dudley-Coker). His father was of Eko Division of Lagos origin and was a member of the Royal West African Frontier Force during World War II. Johnson had five other siblings including his brother, Femi Johnson, founder of Femi Johnson and Company of Ibadan.

Johnson started his education at Reagan Memorial Baptist School, Yaba, Methodist School in 1941. He then attended Hussey College, Warri, 1954. In 1955, he moved to Methodist Boys' High School, Lagos, the school his father attended, where he finished his secondary education in 1957. While in MBHS, Lagos, Johnson was recognised as a good all-round sportsman, becoming the school's athletics captain.

In March 1958, Johnson enlisted in the Nigerian Army. He was sent to Depot Nigerian Army, Zaria in the north of Nigeria for his initial training. In 1959, he attended the Officer Cadet Training School in Ghana. Johnson also attended the Mons Officer Cadet School in Aldershot from October to December 1959 and the Royal Military Academy, Sandhurst, United Kingdom, between January 1960 and December 1961.

== Military career ==
- Zaria Military Depot, 1958–1959.
- United Nations Peace Keeping Troops, Congo
- He was promoted a 2nd Lieutenant, Nigeria Army, 1961.
- Lieutenant, 1962, Captain, October 1962.
- Appointed Deputy Commander, Federal Guards, 1964.
- Commander, Federal Guards, 1964.
- Deputy Adjutant and Quartermaster-General Headquarters, 2nd Brigade, Apapa, Lagos, 1964.
- Major, February 1966;
- Second in command, 4th Battalion, Ibadan.
- Station Commander, Benin, Midwest (old Bendel State).

== Biafra War ==
At the end of the Biafra War, Johnson was among the federal delegates at the end of the war ceremony. In 1966, after the abortive coup d'etat that ended the first Nigerian civilian administration, he became military administrator of Lagos State. In 1967, he became the first governor of Lagos State. His tenure as military governor saw the construction of major infrastructure across the state.

== Governor ==
Johnson was first appointed by Aguiyi-Ironsi as the administrator of the former federal territory of Lagos in 1966. Ironsi was the head of state and wanted someone from Lagos to handle some of the problems of the federal territory. In May 1967, Lagos State was created and Johnson became the first governor of Lagos; the state was now composed of the old Federal Territory of Victoria Island, Ikoyi and Lagos Island plus the additions of the Epe, Badagry, Ikorodu and Ikeja divisions. He was involved in developing the civil service in Lagos State. Johnson was initially assisted by key civil servants, including Administrative Secretary Adeymi-Bero, Legal Secretary Alh. I. O Agoro, Finance Secretary F.C.O Coker, and the Acting Secretary to the Military Government Howson Wright. He waited until April 1968 before appointing his commissioners.

=== Building Lagos ===
- 60.7-kilometre international express road (Lagos–Badagry Expressway) linking Nigeria with the neighbouring countries Benin, Ghana and Togo.
- Toikin Bridge to link Epe to Ikorodu
- Eko Bridge
- Third Mainland Bridge
- A network of roads and bridges that constitutes what is modern day Lagos
- Reclamation of the Bar Beach shoreline.

Another coup in 1975 brought in a new military government, which came to power under an anti-corruption banner.

=== Demolition of Ajele Cemetery ===
Johnson's administration was responsible for the demolition and disinterment of people buried at Ajele Cemetery such as Samuel Ajayi Crowther, James Pinson Labulo Davies, Madam Tinubu, Thomas Babington Macaulay, and many others. The demolition met with a lot of criticism: Prof J.D.Y. Peel noted that the demolition had deprived "Lagosians not only of a precious green space in the heart of the city but of the memorials of their forebears". Nobel Laureate Wole Soyinka called the demolition "the violation of that ancestral place" noting that "the order came from the military governor [Mobolaji Johnson]: 'Dig up those dead and forgotten ancestors and plant a modern council building – with all its lucrative corollaries on that somnolent spot".

== Retirement ==
In 1975 at the inception of the General Murtala Mohammed administration Johnson was one of the two state governors (along with Brigadier General Oluwole Rotimi) found not guilty of corruption by the three-man panel commissioned to investigate the various allegations of corruption amongst the state governors.

Johnson retired from the Nigerian Army in 1975 and entered private business.

== Later life ==
Johnson was the chairman of Nigerian Conservation Foundation.

He became a director of Julius Berger Nigeria in 1979 and served as its chairman from 1996 to 2009.

Johnson was the Chairman Executive Council of Lagos State University Development Foundation.

He was the chairman of the Board of Trustees of Methodist Boys' High School, Lagos Old Boys' National Association. He was honoured with the position because of his contributions to his alma mater.

== Personal life and death ==
Johnson had four children, three sons and a daughter, including Deji and Seyi, who is Business Development Director at Julius Berger. His daughter-in-law is Omobola Johnson.

He died on 30 October 2019, at the age of 83 in his home. His death was announced by his son, Deji Johnson.

== Legacy ==
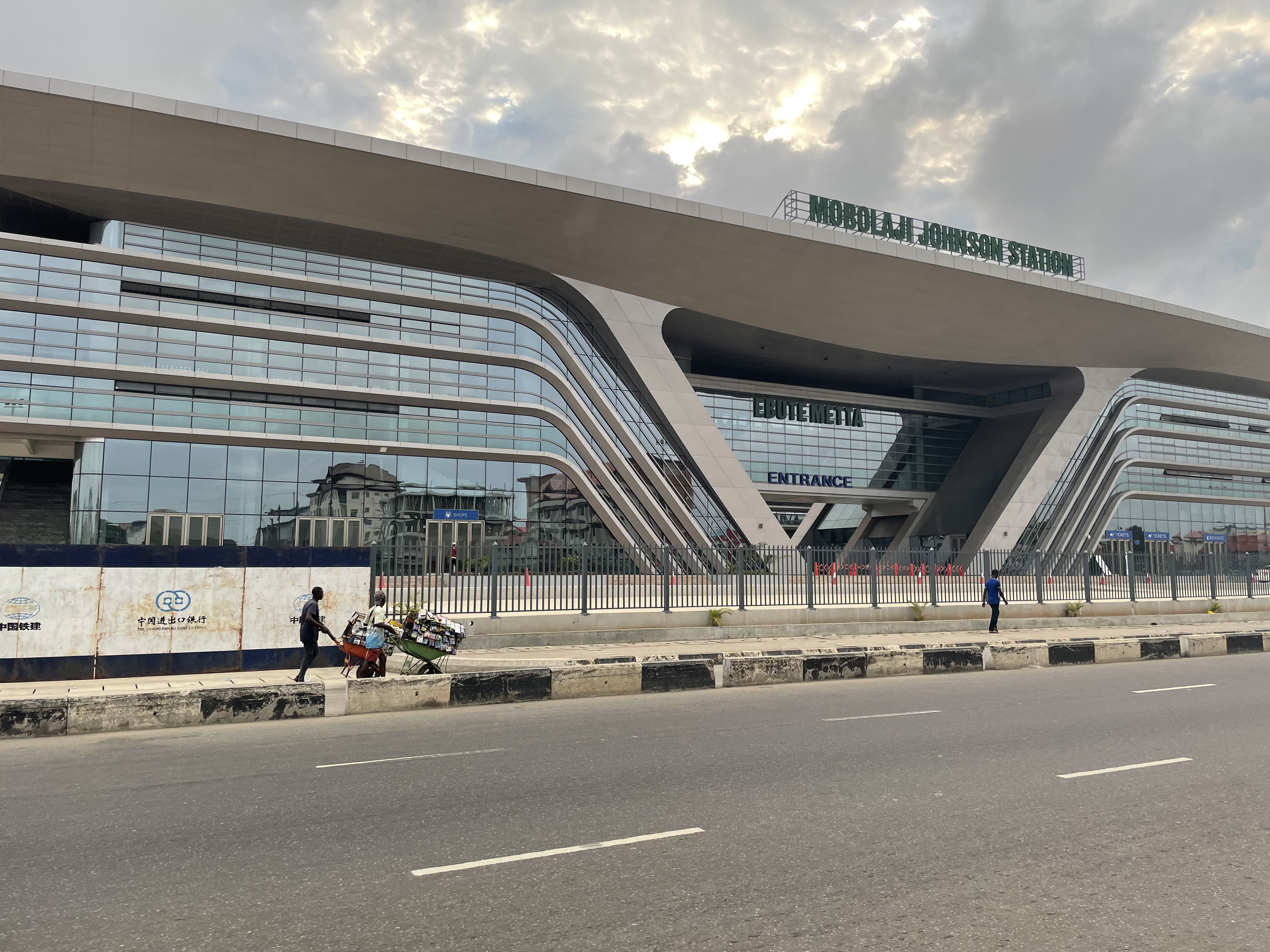

A road, an avenue, and a sports complex in Mobolaji's home state, as well as a housing scheme in Lekki and a railway station in Ebute Metta, were named in his honour.

On 27 December 2025, he was one of four Yoruba Lagosians honoured during the Eyo Festival for his contributions as the first military governor of Lagos State in 1967. Johnson was a Saro Lagosian, born to Joshua Motola Johnson and Gbemisola Johnson (née Dudley-Coker).

== See also ==
- Timeline of Lagos, 1960s–1970s
