= Ajele Cemetery =

Former cemetery in Nigeria

Coordinates: 6.4515°N 3.3942°E

Ajele Cemetery was a major cemetery on Lagos Island demolished by the Lagos State military government under Brigadier Mobolaji Johnson in the 1970s. Ajele in Yoruba means government administrative official and the cemetery was so named because of the many British colonial officials who were buried there.

== Demolition ==
Brigadier Mobolaji Johnson, military governor of Lagos State demolished Ajele Cemetery in December 1971 in order to clear the site for the Lagos State Secretariat. The demolition attracted a lot of criticism and many historians and commentators noted the consequent loss of valuable history. Prof J.D.Y. Peel noted that the demolition had deprived "Lagosians not only of a precious green space in the heart of the city but of the memorials of their forebears". Nobel Laureate Wole Soyinka called the demolition "the violation of that ancestral place" noting that "the order came from the military governor: 'Dig up those dead and forgotten ancestors and plant a modern council building – with all its lucrative corollaries on that somnolent spot".

== Notable burials ==
- James Pinson Labulo Davies
- Samuel Ajayi Crowther
- Consul Benjamin Campbell
- Police Magistrate Josiah Gerard
- Thomas Babington Macaulay
