= Ìyál'ọ́jà =

Yoruba female chieftaincy title

Iyalojas of Offa at Ijakadi festival

Ìyál'ọ́jà (pronounced [ì.jál.ɔ́.d͡ʒà]) is a Yoruba word that literally translates as 'Mother of the Market'. It has commonly been used to refer to a prominent traditional chieftaincy title among the Yoruba people.

== History ==
Across various Yoruba markets and the states to which they belong, an Iyaloja is usually democratically chosen by her constituents (and is thereafter confirmed by the oba) or single-handedly chosen by the oba himself. In rare situations, like the case of the Iyaloja of Lagos in 2013, the deceased Iyaloja can choose her successor before her death.

Research into the ancient culture and tradition of the Yoruba people has shown that despite the chieftaincy structure being largely patriarchal, the female titleholders Iyalode, Iyaloja and Iyalaje are three of the most important leaders in the system, figures whose opinions carried as much weight as those of the male chiefs. An equivalent male title known as Babaloja, meaning Father of the Market, is also functionally a subordinate of the Iyaloja. These titles influence the organization of the market and how traders relate to one another.

== List of "Iyalojas" in Lagos ==
Name	Reign
Abibatu Mogaji	1980s–2013
Folashade Tinubu-Ojo 49 years old	2013–present

== Controversies ==
On 1 January 2017, the News Agency of Nigeria reported that the Iyaloja of Ibadan, Chief Labake Lawal, had been impeached for financial misconduct by the "Ibadan Joint Traders Association". The supposedly removed Iyaloja later played down her removal, explaining that only the traditional monarch, the Olubadan of Ibadanland, had the authority to appoint or replace the Iyaloja. On 9 May 2017, after the appointment of Alhaja Iswat Abiola Ameringun as the new Iyaloja by the Olubadan, Chief Lawal described her removal as a show of ethnic bias and a reflection of a lack of due process as only the Olubadan-in-Council was capable of removing her. A new development ensued when most of the members of the traditional council disagreed with the decision from the Olubadan and posited that the removal of Chief Lawal did not represent the position of most of the cabinet members. Further to this, Chief Labake Lawal sued the Olubadan, Olubadan-in-Council and the newly installed Iyaloja for "violating her right to natural justice", urging the court to declare the new appointment "null, void and of no legal effect".

In July 2013, it was reported that the daughter of former governor of Lagos State, Chief Bola Ahmed Tinubu, had been selected as the new Iyaloja of Lagos, pending the granting of official approval by the Oba of Lagos. This immediately caused a media storm, as critics argued that she wasn't qualified in terms of age and market experience. Others contended that it was a strategy by Chief Tinubu to acquire more power for his family among Lagosians. The market leader for Lagos Mainland local government opined that her appointment was a collective one and was not politically influenced. The Secretary General for Lagos Markets explained that her ascension was lawful, and in accordance with the market association's statutes. She also stated that she met the minimum requirement needed to be an Iyaloja. It was also reported that Folashade was the choice of the late Iyaloja. Despite these apparent hindrances to her coronation, on 29 October 2013, Folashade Tinubu-Ojo was officially installed as the new Iyaloja. Those present at the ceremony included her stepmother, Oluremi Tinubu, the Oba of Lagos, and the Alake of Egbaland.

In 2026, Folashade Tinubu-Ojo launched the Iyaloja General Movement (IGM) to mobilize support for her father's re-election. The movement was launched at Eagle Square located in Abuja and claimed to have established a presence in all 774 local governments across the 36 states. It also set a target of securing 10 million votes for her father.

== Ìyálájé ==
In Yoruba culture, Iyalaje symbolizes the embodiment of Aje, a Yoruba deity associated with wealth, success and prosperity. It's a spiritual title given to women. Aje is regarded as the first market woman, spreads prosperity wherever she goes. It's believed to have landed in Ife before returning to Benin. While Iyaloja is an appointed market leader who oversees social and trading activities, Iyalaje plays a bridge between market women and everyone else working in the market. She offers prayers for everyone, including the Iyaloja, for prosperous trading and successful sales.

Ìyálájé house Agungu Ibadan

In 2021, the Ooni of Ife conferred the title of Iyalaje Oodua on Princess (Dr.) Oluwatoyin Kolade.

== See also ==
- Erelu
- Iyalode
- Olori
