= Samuel Crowther (priest) =

English priest (1769–1829)

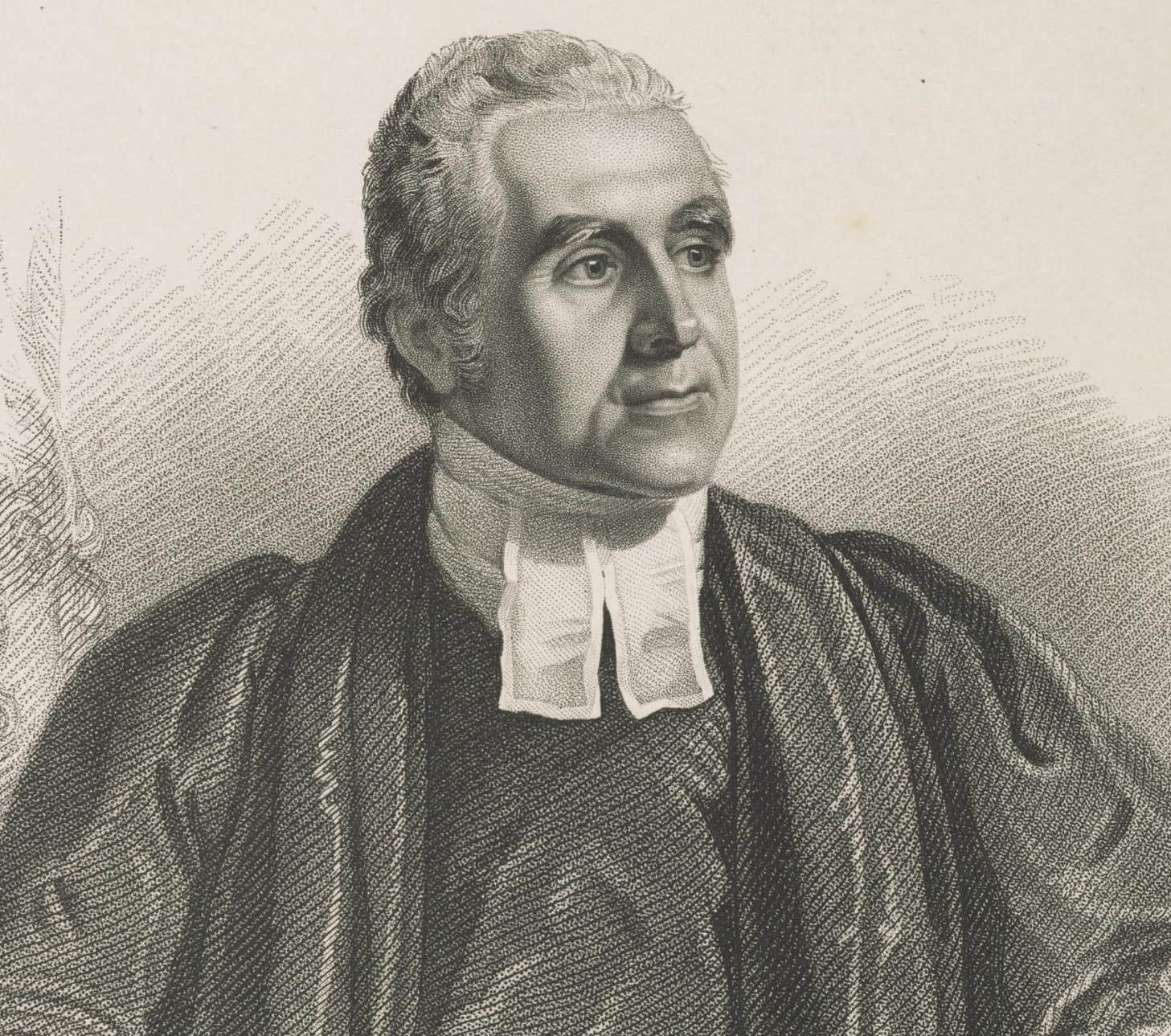
Crowther in an 1828 stipple engraving on paper after Ramsay Richard Reinagle (UP C 232, National Galleries of Scotland)

Samuel Crowther (9 January 1769 - 28 September 1829) was a Church of England priest, most notable as one of the pioneers of the Church Mission Society and a member of the first committee of the Newfoundland School Society (NSS).

== Life ==
He matriculated at Brasenose College, Oxford on 26 October 1787 and graduated BA from New College, Oxford in 1791, also becoming a Fellow of the latter. He was ordained deacon on 3 June 1792 and priest on 26 May 1793, both times by Edward Smallwell, Bishop of Oxford, followed by a curacy in Barking, Essex in 1796.

He became vicar (later rector) of the united parish of Christ Church, Newgate and St Leonards Foster Lane in the City of London on 17 February 1800, a post he then held until his death. On 11 February 1801 he also became lecturer at St Botolph-without-Bishopsgate. He is recorded as ministering to Francis Finlay in his final days at nearby Newgate Prison before his execution for forgery on 9 February 1803 and at Christ's Hospital whilst Leigh Hunt was a pupil there. Hunt observed Crowther was "worthy of the talents and virtues of his kinsman, (Note: Meaning Crowther's uncle Samuel Richardson.) though inclining to a mode of faith which is supposed to produce more faith than charity".

Samuel Ajayi Crowther took the elder man's first name and surname on his baptism in 1825. The original Crowther died in office after an illness of almost five years and was buried to the north of the communion table in Christ Church - his bust and tomb monument were destroyed in bombing during the Second World War, though an etching of them from the early 1830s survives in the London Museum collection. His funeral on 6 October was attended by the Lord Mayor-elect and included a sermon by the Revd Daniel Wilson, then vicar of Islington and one of Crowther's fellow NSS committee members.
