= Abiodun (Oyo ruler) =

Alaafin of Oyo
- Reign: 1770-1789
- Predecessor: Majeogbe
- Successor: Awole Arogangan
- Born: Abiodun Adegorolu; Oyo Empire
- Died: Oyo Empire

Abiodun (reigned c. 1770–1789) was an 18th-century Alaafin, or monarch, of the Oyo Empire in West Africa.

== Oyo Empire ==
Coming to the throne shortly after the Oyo subjugation of neighboring Dahomey, Abiodun soon found himself embroiled in a civil war over the goals of the newly wealthy state.

Bashorun Gaha, the empire's prime minister and lord marshal, had used his power to pervert the constitutional terms of abdication in a bid to limit the powers of the Alaafin and gain more political power for himself. During Gaha's power play, he had succeeded in removing five corrupt dishonest kings.

In terms of trade, while Abiodun favored economic expansion for its own sake, his opponents favored using the wealth from Dahomey's tribute to finance further military expansion. Abiodun soon proved victorious and pursued a policy of peaceful trade with the European merchants of the coast. This course significantly weakened the army, leaving his successor, Awole, facing a number of local revolts.

== Descendants and legacy ==
Abiodun's reign is generally remembered as a time of peace and prosperity for the Oyo, though Nigerian playwright Femi Òsófisan portrays him as a despot in his play The Chattering and the Song (1973).

His son Alaafin Atiba was the founder of the ruling dynasty in the present Oyo. His grandson Cândido da Fonseca Galvão, under the title of Dom Oba II, was an important South American abolitionist during Pedro II of Brazil's rule. His other descendants include the 19th-century warrior Oluyole, the historian Samuel Johnson, his brother physician Obadiah Johnson, Samuel Ajayi Crowther, the first African bishop of the CMS, prominent colonial politician Bode Thomas, pioneering jurist Modupe Omo-Eboh, as well as Nigerian founding father Herbert Macaulay and Lagos’ philanthropist and first Seriki Musulumi Mohammed Shitta Bey. An important contemporary descendant was Dr. Ameyo Adadevoh. Another one, his great-great-grandson Lamidi Adeyemi III, was the Alaafin from 1972 until his death in 2022.
