= Patrick Dele-Cole =

Nigerian diplomat, journalist and politician (1940–2026)

His Excellency Patrick Dele-Cole OFR
- Born: 1940
- Died: 17 October 2026 (aged 86); London, England
- Education: University of Otago; Cambridge University
- Occupations: Journalist and diplomat
- Known for: Managing director of Daily Times.
- Children: Tonye Cole

Patrick Dele-Cole (1940 – 17 October 2026) was a Nigerian politician, journalist, historian and diplomat who in 1976 became the managing director of the Daily Times. He was also a presidential candidate of the Social Democratic Party in the early 1990s, and was Nigeria's ambassador to Argentina and Brazil.

Dele-Cole was the author of the book Modern Traditional Elites in the Politics of Lagos.

== Education ==
Dele-Cole attended the University of Otago, New Zealand, where he earned a first-class honours degree. He also studied at Cambridge University.

== Career ==
Cole served as a visiting professor at the University of Pennsylvania from 1969 to 1973 and was a fellow of King's College, Cambridge, during the same period. From 1973 to 1976, he worked as an administrative officer in the Political Department of the Cabinet Office in Lagos. He subsequently served as managing director of the Daily Times of Nigeria from 1976 to 1979 and later became a special adviser to The Guardian. As managing director of the Daily Times he restored the paper's former influence to become one of Africa's largest at that time, and brought in influential journalists, including Dele Giwa and Stanley Macebuh.

Cole served as a member of the Presidential Panel on the History of Nigeria Since Independence in 1977 and participated in the Nigeria–China Forum in 1979. He was appointed Nigerian ambassador to Brazil, serving from 1987 to 1990. From 1998 to 1999, he was the Peoples Democratic Party's deputy national chairman for the South-South geopolitical zone. He later served as special adviser to the president on international relations from 1999 to 2001. He also represented Nigeria at the United Nations and the Organisation of African Unity in 1976, 1989 and 1990.

== Death ==
Dele-Cole died on 17 October 2026, at the age of 86.
