= Magaji =

- Gender: Male
- Language: Hausa

Origin
- Origin: Nigeria
- Meaning: Successor, chief.
- Region of origin: Northern Nigeria

Magaji is a male surname that is originated from the Hausa tribe in Nigeria. Its meaning is attached to a cultural significance which means (leader' or 'chief or a successor).

== Notable Individuals with the Name ==
- Magaji Abdullahi, Nigerian politician
- Magaji Muhammed, Nigerian politician

== Places ==
- Birnin Magaji/Kiyaw
