= Sam Crowther =

Dutch footballer (born 2000)

Personal information
- Full name: Sammy Ian Crowther
- Date of birth: 3 April 2000 (age 26)
- Place of birth: Groningen, Netherlands
- Height: 1.94 m (6 ft 4 in)
- Position: Forward

Team information
- Current team: Staphorst
- Number: 9

Youth career
- –2014: GRC Groningen
- 2014–2019: Groningen

Senior career*
Years	Team	Apps	(Gls)
2019	Jong Groningen	3	(1)
2019–2020	ONS Sneek	20	(6)
2020–2022	Go Ahead Eagles	7	(0)
2022–2023	Victoria Rosport	16	(5)
2023–2024	DVS '33	30	(13)
2024–	Staphorst	22	(21)
- * Club domestic league appearances and goals as of 11:48, 12 March 2025 (UTC)

Sam Crowther (born 3 April 2000) is a Dutch professional footballer who plays as a forward for Derde Divisie club Staphorst.

== Career ==
Crowther was born in Groningen. After playing for Jong Groningen and ONS Sneek, he joined Go Ahead Eagles in summer 2020. In March 2024, it was announced that Crowther would be leaving DVS '33 to join Vierde Divisie side Staphorst the following season.

== Career statistics ==
As of 4 March 2021

Appearances and goals by club, season and competition
Club	Season	League			KNVB Cup		Other		Total	
Club	Season	Division	Apps	Goals	Apps	Goals	Apps	Goals	Apps	Goals
Jong Groningen	2018–19	Derde Divisie Saturday	3	1	—		0	0	3	1
ONS Sneek	2019–20	Derde Divisie Saturday	20	6	1	0	0	0	21	6
Go Ahead Eagles	2020–21	Eerste Divisie	1	0	0	0	0	0	1	0
Career total			21	6	1	0	0	0	22	6
