= Oliver Ogedengbe Macaulay =

Nigerian politician (1918–1972)

- Born: 15 December 1918
- Died: 14 September 1972 (aged 53)
- Other names: Oged Macaulay
- Occupation: politician
- Father: Herbert Macaulay

Oliver Ogedengbe Macaulay (15 December 1918 – 14 September 1972), alias Oged Macaulay was a Nigerian politician, archivist, journalist, public relations consultant, and private secretary to Oba Adeyinka Oyekan. He was the son of Herbert Macaulay.

== Early life and education ==
Oged Macaulay was born on 15 December 1918. However, not much is known about Oged's mother, who was possibly Isabella Macaulay, a princess of Akure, since it is unclear whether his father, Herbert Macaulay, remarried after losing his wife, Caroline Pratt in 1899. Oged was an alumnus of CMS Grammar School, Lagos.

== Career ==
Oged was a journalist whose articles appeared in the West African Pilot. He also served as Assistant Secretary of the NCNC, a political party that was founded by his father, Herbert Macaulay. Oged was a part of the Zikist Movement within the NCNC which sought a more radical nationalist position than the larger NCNC. On 27 October 1948, Osita Agwuna, Deputy President of the Zikist Movement, delivered a speech titled "A Call for Revolution" in which calls were made for not paying taxes, civil disobedience, and a boycott of British goods. The British colonial government tried the Zikists for sedition and Oged served a year in prison.

== Oged Collection at the University of Ibadan ==
Oged Macaulay's private archive (The Oged Collection) at the University of Ibadan complements his father's Macaulay Papers at the Africana Section of the University of Ibadan Library. The Oged Collection sheds light on Herbert Macaulay's roots and descendants. It also provides an overview of party politics after Herbert Macaulay's death and includes papers on many land disputes in Lagos, border disputes in Oshogun, family history of Lagos chiefs and celebrities. Various newspaper cuttings, personal diaries, and correspondence are included in the Oged Collection.
