= Lagos Market Women's Association =

- Formation: 1920s
- Founded: Alimotu Pelewura

The Lagos Market Women's Association is a Lagos-based advocacy group co-founded by Alimotu Pelewura. The group garnered support from the market women and Eleko Eshugbayi.

== Overview ==
Pelewura became the head of the market women of the Eko market, known as Alaga. In 1932, the British introduced a policy banning street trading, which caused discontent among market women. Through the Lagos Market Women's Association, they criticized the policy. When the British government proposed expanding the market to accommodate more market women, it required them to secure a store and pay four shillings. The association rejected the proposal, describing it as an attempt to cut women off from trading.

When the authorities attempted to dismantle the market, Alimotu Pelewura resisted and was briefly imprisoned. During the world war, traders rallied behind their leader to oppose policies that did not benefit them.

In 1941- 1942, the market women campaigned for the abolition of income tax. Later on, In 1972, Raliatu Ajoke, Iyaloja of Lagos, wrote to Colonel Mobolaji Johnson, the Military Governor of Lagos State, under the name United Market Women Association requesting a meeting to discuss collaboration between Lagos market women and the state government.

Market women in Lagos existed as a structured community rather than informal gathering. This allowed traders to act collectively on policies that affect them. Scholarly analysis of public administration in Lagos categorises the Association as a formalized political interest group rather than a neutral economic guild. It historically maintained a transactional relationship with local administrative authorities, utilizing interest group strategies such as; direct lobbying, formal petitions, organised delegations to local market policies, urban planning and local taxation systems. The market comprises eleven markets, including Ereko, Faji, Alakoro, Ebute-ero, Araromi, Oko-Awo, Obun-Eko and Ebute-Meta

== Organizational Structure and Governance ==
The administrative framework of the association operates on a structured, three-tier organizational system designed to coordinate trading activities across various local zones and manage political mobilization efficiently. Within Individual market, membership is voluntarily and organized around specific commodity lines and guilds while individual traders hold minimal direct influence over local authorities independently. The association structure allows members to pool resources and articulate shared commercial interests collectively. This governance system enables leadership to enforce civic compliance and maintain market place order. However, scholars note that the association faced challenges as regards their relationship with the local government because of split management. In the local council, markets responsibilities were scattered across too many different departments. This made it difficult for the government and the market women's leadership to communicate and work together smoothly.

== Prominent figures ==
- Alimotu Aminatu Pelewura (President of Lagos Market Women Association)
- Madam Ojigobi, the Iya Egbe (Lady President) of Ereko Market
- Rabiatu Alaso
- Jariaogbe Oniwaka
- Ashiya Kosoko
- Sabitiyu Opomoja
- Simbi Ojigobi
- Omorinlewa Eleto
- Osenatu Dosunmu (head, oysters sellers)
- Wusamotu Shelleh (head, bead sellers)
- Binta Balogun

== Publications ==
- Social Movement in Colonial Nigeria: The Case of Lagos Market Women Association
- Lagos Market Women During the Inter-War Years: The Water Rate Agitation, 1932–1941
- The Activities of Market Women in Colonial Lagos
