= Samuel Ajayi Crowther =

Anglican bishop in Yoruba country (present day Nigeria)

The Right Reverend Samuel Ajayi Crowther
- Primate of all Nigeria
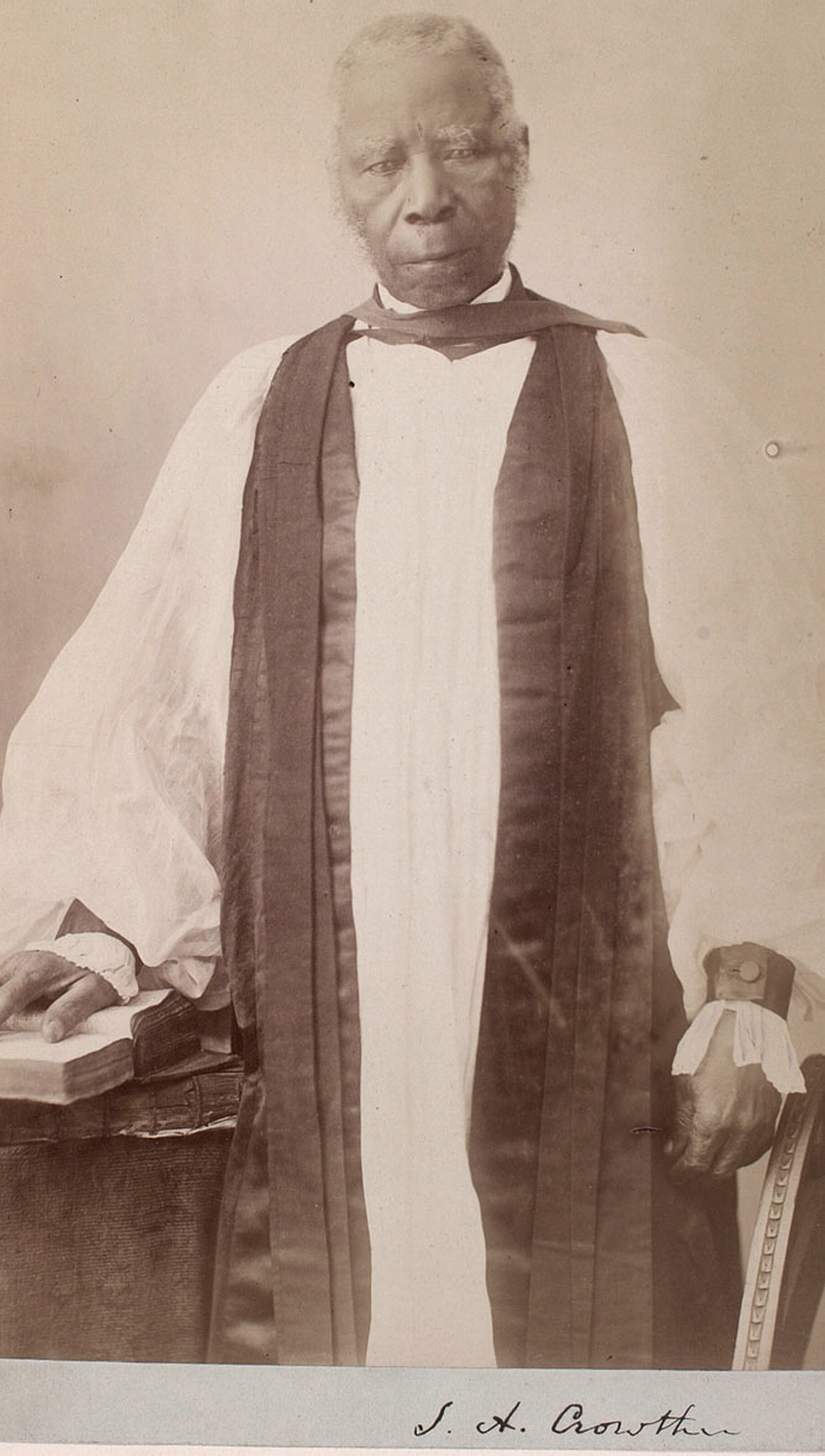
- Crowther as bishop in 1867
- Church: Church of Nigeria
- See: Bishop of the Niger
- In office: 1864–1891

Personal details
- Born: c. 1809 Osogun, Oyo Empire
- Died: 31 December 1891 (aged 82) Lagos, Lagos Colony
- Education: St Mary's Church, Fourah Bay College, Oxford University

Samuel Ajayi Crowther (c. 1809 – 31 December 1891) was a Yoruba linguist, clergyman, and the first African Anglican bishop of West Africa. Born in Osogun (around Ado Awaye present, Oyo State, Nigeria), he and his family were captured by Fulani slave raiders when he was about twelve years old. This took place during the Yoruba civil wars, notably the Owu wars of 1821–1829, where his village Osogun was ransacked. Ajayi was later on resold to Portuguese slave dealers, where he was put on board to be transported to the New World through the Atlantic.

Crowther was freed from slavery at a coastal port by the Royal Navy's West Africa Squadron, which was enforcing the British ban against the Atlantic slave trade. The liberated peoples were resettled in Sierra Leone. In Sierra Leone, Ajayi adopted the English name Samuel Crowther, and began his education in English. He adopted Christianity and also identified with Sierra Leone's then ascendant Krio ethnic group. He studied languages and was ordained as a minister in England, where he was later conferred an honorary doctoral degree from Oxford University. He prepared a Yoruba grammar and translation of the Anglican Book of Common Prayer into Yoruba, also working on a Yoruba version of the Bible, as well as other language projects.

== Biography ==
A grandson of King Abiodun, through his mother, Afala, Ajayi was around 12 years old when he and his family were captured, along with his entire village, by Fulani slave raiders in March 1821 and sold to Portuguese slave traders. His mother Afala, who was later baptized with the name Hannah, toddler brother, and other family members were among the captives. His father, Ayemi, was most likely killed in the raid of his village or shortly afterwards.

The British outlawed the Atlantic slave trade in 1807 and used their navy to patrol the coast of Africa. During that period, Spain and Portugal still allowed the Atlantic slave trade in their colonies in the Americas. Before the slave ship left port for the Americas, it was boarded by crew from a British Royal Navy ship under the command of Captain Henry Leeke. They freed the captives, and took Ajayi and his family to Freetown, Sierra Leone, where they were resettled by local authorities.

While in Sierra Leone, Crowther was cared for by the Anglican Church Missionary Society (CMS) and was taught how to read and write English. Due to his remarkable intellectual qualities, Ajayi was sent to school, and within a short time, he was able to read the Bible with ease. He converted to Christianity. On 11 December 1825 he was baptized by John Raban, naming himself after Samuel Crowther, vicar of Christ Church, Newgate, London, and one of the pioneers of the CMS.

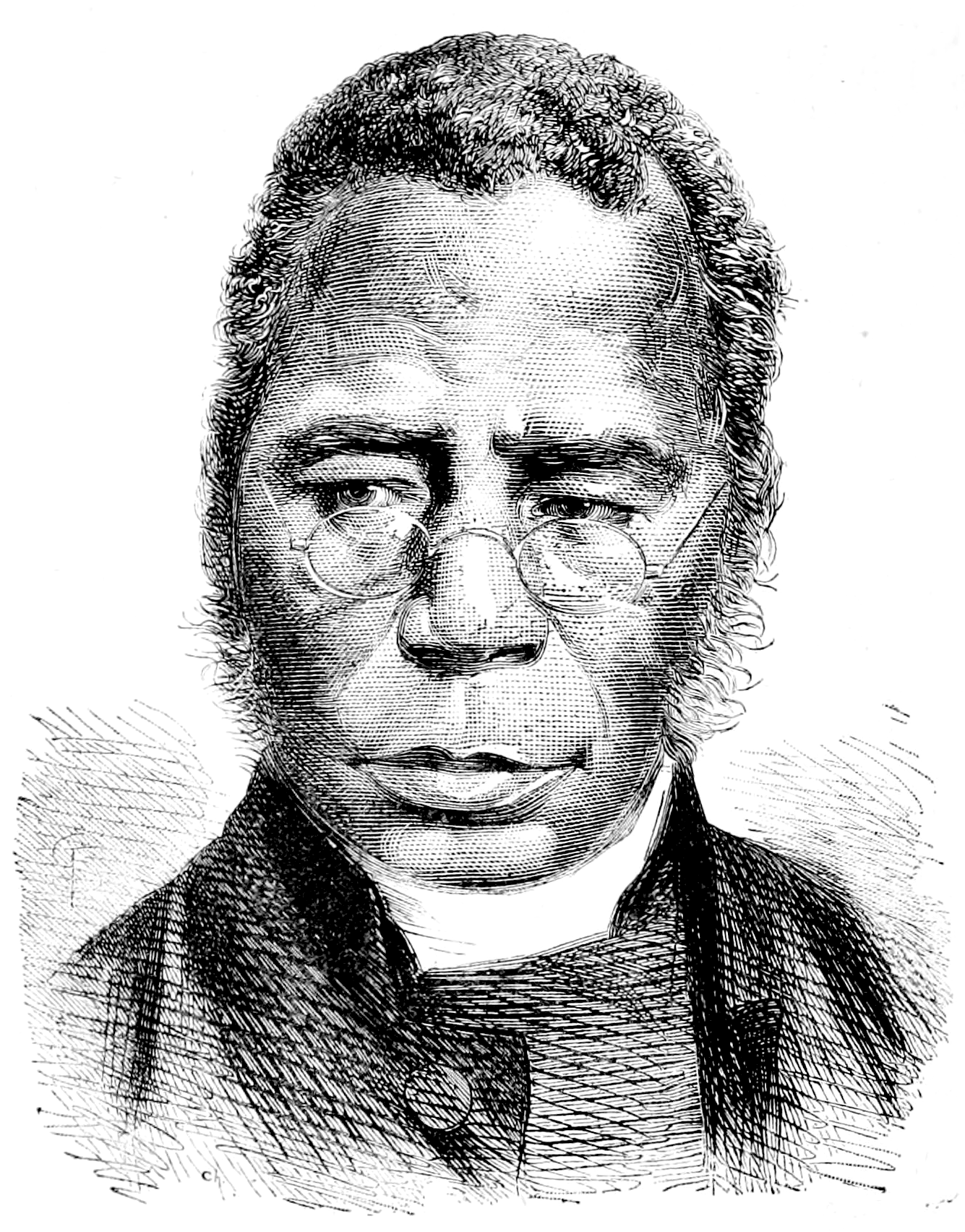
In Niger Territory, 1888

While in Freetown, Crowther became interested in languages. In 1826 he was taken to England to attend the school of St Mary's Church in Islington, which had established a connection with free Africans in the 18th century. He returned to Freetown in 1827. He was the first student admitted to the newly opened Fourah Bay College, an Anglican missionary school. Because of his interest in language, he studied Latin and Greek of the classical curriculum, but also Temne of West Africa. After completing his studies, Crowther began teaching at the school.

Crowther's missionary journey to Yoruba country (present day Nigeria) began in 1841. He represented the missionary arm of the Niger Expedition, alongside Rev. J. F. Schön. Crowther was ordained a priest and selected for the CMS project in the Yoruba mission on his second visit to England in 1843, after his brilliant account of the expedition and the rare qualities he displayed. In 1846, Crowther and Rev. Townsend opened the CMS mission in Abeokuta. During the 1854 Niger Expedition, Crowther had a hand in the founding of the missions in Niger.

== Marriage and family ==
Crowther married a schoolmistress, Asano (i.e. Hassana; she was formerly Muslim), baptised Susan. She had also been liberated from a Portuguese slave ship as mentioned in Crowther's 1837 letter. He writes: "She was captured by His Majesty's ship Bann, Captain Charles Phillips, on the 31st October 1822." Asano was therefore among the captives resettled in Sierra Leone. She had also converted to Christianity. Their several children included Dandeson Coates Crowther, who later entered the ministry and in 1891 became archdeacon of the Niger Delta.

Their second daughter, Abigail, married Thomas Babington Macaulay, a junior associate. Their son and Crowther's grandson, Herbert Macaulay, became one of the first Nigerian nationalists.

== Mission ==
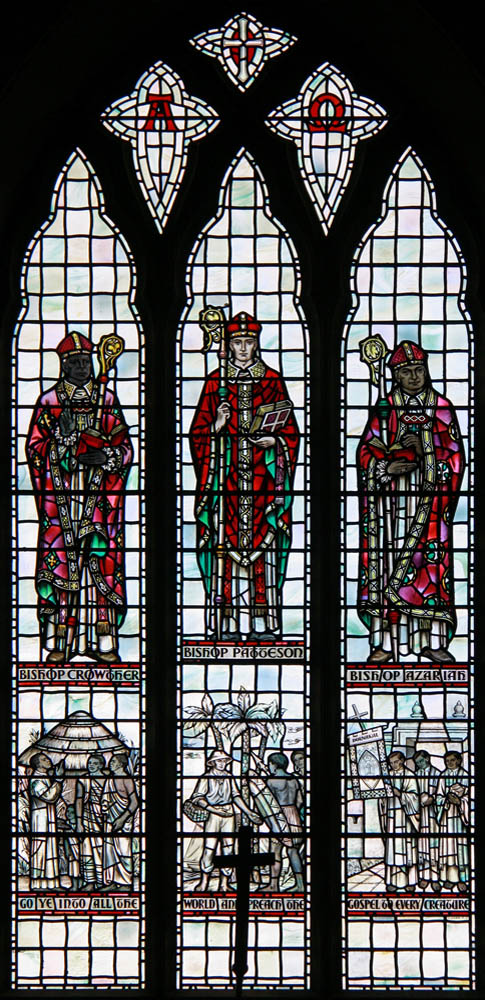
Stained glass window in St Mark's Church, Bromley, with Crowther on the left, next to John Patteson and Vedanayagam Samuel Azariah. Below Crowther is a depiction of his mission.

Crowther was selected to accompany the missionary James Schön on the Niger expedition of 1841. Together with Schön, he was expected to learn Hausa for use on the expedition. Its goal was to stimulate commerce, teach agricultural techniques, encourage Christianity, and help end the slave trade. Following the expedition, Crowther was recalled to England, where he was trained as a minister and ordained by the Bishop of London. Schön wrote to the Church Missionary Society noting Crowther's usefulness and ability on the expedition, recommending that he be prepared for ordination.

Crowther returned to Africa in 1843 and, with Henry Townsend, opened a mission in Abeokuta, in today's Ogun State, Nigeria.

Crowther began translating the Bible into Yoruba and compiling a Yoruba dictionary. In 1843, his grammar book, on which he had begun working during the Niger expedition, was published. A Yoruba version of the Anglican Book of Common Prayer followed later. Crowther also compiled A Vocabulary of the Yoruba Language, including a large number of local proverbs, published in London in 1852.

Following the British Niger Expeditions of 1854 and 1857, Crowther authored and published an Igbo primer in 1857. He published one for the Nupe language in 1860, and a full grammar and vocabulary of Nupe in 1864.

Crowther had become a close associate and friend of Captain James Pinson Labulo Davies, an influential politician, mariner, philanthropist and industrialist in colonial Lagos. The two men collaborated on social initiatives in Lagos, such as the founding of The Academy (a social and cultural center for public enlightenment) on 24 October 1866. Crowther was the first patron and Captain J. P. L. Davies was the first president.

== Merits ==
In 1864, Crowther was ordained as the first African bishop of the Anglican Church; he was consecrated a bishop on St Peter's day in 1864, by Charles Longley, Archbishop of Canterbury, at Canterbury Cathedral. The licence from Queen Victoria for Crowther's consecration as a bishop authorised and empowered him "Bishop of the United Church of England and Ireland in the said countries in Western Africa beyond the limits of our dominions." He had continued his studies and later received the degree of Doctor of Divinity from the University of Oxford. He later met Queen Victoria and read the Lord's prayer to her in Yoruba, which she described as soft and melodious.

In March 1881, he and his son Dandeson Crowther attended a conference on the island of Madeira, in the Atlantic Ocean west of Morocco. Crowther had begun to work in languages other than Yoruba, but he continued to supervise the translation of the Yoruba Bible (Bibeli Mimọ), which was completed in the mid-1880s, a few years before his death.

Crowther is celebrated with a feast on the liturgical calendar of some Anglican churches, including the Church of Nigeria, on 31 December.

== Death, burial, exhumation, and reburial ==
Crowther died of a stroke in Lagos, on 31 December 1891, aged 82. He was buried at Ajele Cemetery in Lagos.

In 1971 the Lagos State Government under Mobolaji Johnson wanted to redevelop the site of the cemetery for new government offices and issued notices to families of the deceased. Seth Kale, Anglican Bishop of Lagos, representing the Anglican community and Crowther's family, delayed exhumation and reburial until 1976. An elaborate ceremony was held at a new burial site and a cenotaph was installed at Cathedral Church of Christ, Lagos.
