= Alimotu Pelewura =

Nigerian trader (c. 1865–1951)

Chief Alimotu Pelewura
- Born: c. 1865; Lagos Colony
- Died: 1951 (aged 85–86)
- Monuments: Pelewura Market on Adeniji Adele Road, Lagos
- Occupation: Women activist
- Years active: mid 1920s – 1951
- Era: Colonial Nigeria
- Title: Iyaloja of Lagos
- Term: mid 1920s – 1951
- Successor: Abibatu Mogaji
- Political party: Nigerian National Democratic Party

Chief Alimotu Pelewura, (c. 1865–1951) was a Nigerian trader who was leader of the Lagos Market Women's Association, a Lagos-based market women advocacy group. She was also an important political ally of Herbert Macaulay.

== Early life ==
Pelewura was born in Lagos to a polygynous family. She was the elder of two children from her biological mother. Her mother was a fish trader and Pelewura also chose fish trading as an occupation. By 1900, she had become an important market women leader and trader and in 1910, was given a chieftaincy title by Oba Eshugbayi Eleko. In the 1920s, she was leader of the Ereko meat market and with the support of Herbert Macaulay rose to become leader of the newly formed Lagos Market Women Association. She belonged to the Awori tribe of the Yoruba people

== Lagos Market Women's Association ==
The Lagos Market Women's Association was founded in the 1920s by Pelewura and others. Pelewura, a fish trader, was the head of the Ereko market became the association's president. Under her leadership, LMWA protested against taxation and price controls of produce, both of which she believed would negatively impact on the livelihood of women.

=== Politics and agitation against taxation ===
According to the West African Pilot Newspaper report of December 19, 1940, In the 1932, twenty-five women of ranks led by Madam Alimotu Pelewura; Madam Birikisu Iyalode; Comfort Ige; Efunyinka of Aromire Market; and Laninhun Aduke led the market women in protest against taxation of women by the colonial government. When rumors surfaced about a proposed tax on women, Pelewura was a member of a committee of women that marched to the government house in protest against the proposed plan. Chief Obanikoro, Chief Oluwa, Yesufu Owo and Kadiri Oluwa were also present. In the same year, due to her leadership of the protest, she was appointed as a women's representative in the Ilu Committee, an advisory group organized by the Oba of Lagos. In the mid 1930s, she led a protest against the relocation of the Ereko market to the Oluwole area of Lagos, Pelewura and some Ereko women attempted to physically block any relocation action by authorities which led to her detention. The market women in Lagos rallied in her support and she and other women detainees were released.

In 1940, the colonial government proposed a taxation plan on women who earned above 50 pounds. This same year, Captain AP Pullen (the Colonial Commissioner in Lagos) created a “Food Control Price Scheme” called the Pullen Scheme to dictate where food should be sold; who should sell; and at what price it should be sold in the favour of the European merchants at the damaged of the local market women. Female taxation was a novelty in Yorubaland and the women again rose in protest, Pelewura and other women objected because of its novelty and also because of the challenging economic difficulties such as high unemployment rates as a result of World War II. Though not many market women earned above 50 pounds, she felt it could be a slippery slope towards full taxation of women. However, the colonial government responded by increasing the taxable income to those earning more than 200 pounds.

In 1939, Pelewura became an executive member of the Nigerian Union of Young Democrats, a party that was aligned with NNDP. She sometimes acted as a speaker in NNDP's rallies on behalf of NNDP candidates, even though women were disenfranchised. She was briefly a member of the Oyinkan Abayomi led Nigerian Women's Party.

=== Price control ===
During World War II, inflation rose in Lagos as a result of food scarcity. In 1941, to control the wartime economy, the government enacted a flexible price control policy on certain food produce that will be reviewed periodically. Due to widespread opposition and non adherence to the policy, the government made plans to control the sale of produce through multinationals. The market women led by Pelewura objected to the policy stating that it would deprive women of needed income. However, the colonial government was adamant on keeping the price regulation in place. The situation led to conflicts between LMWA and the colonial government.

Pelewura died in 1951. She was succeeded by Abibatu Mogaji.

== Legacy ==
Pelewura was depicted in the 2019 biopic, The Herbert Macaulay Affair.

== The Twenty-Five Women of Ranks ==
The women of Lagos that protested against taxation are listed below.

• Madam Ojigobi (Iya Egbe Ereko).

• Madame Fatumo (Otun Iya Egbe Ereko).

• Madame Alimotu Pelewura (Alaga Ereko).

• Madame Salamotu (Awotegun Ereko).

• Madame Barikisu (Iyalode Ita-Faji).

• Madame Thumazia Ramos (Alaga Ita-Faji).

• Madame Ayisatu (Ajigbeda Ita-Faji).

• Madame Ashiya Arolo (Osi Iyalode Ita-Faji).

• Madame Aminatu Jeariogbe (Balogun Ita-Faji).

• Madame Sheffi (Are Ita-Faji).

• Madame Patumo (Sekiteri Ita-Faji).

• Madame Comfort Ige (Iya Egbe Ebute Ero).

• Madame Madinatu (Alaga Ebute Ero).

• Madame Mariano (Iya Alaje Ebute Ero).

• Madame Askari Aduke (Awotegun Ebute Ero).

• Madame Asimowun Morenikeji (Balogun Ogun Eko).

• Madame Ayisatu (Iyalode Elediye).

• Madame Safu (Erelu Elediye).

• Madame Awanatu Agnes’s (Iya Egbe Elediye).

• Madame Safu (Balogun Elediye).

• Madame Salamotu Sashi (Iya Egbe Ajegunle).

• Madame Mariano (Balogun Elefun).

• Madame Asimowun (Iya Egbe Elefun).

• Madame Moriamo Oshodi (Otun Iya Egbe Elefun).

• Madame Ajoke (Osi Iya Egbe Elefun).

== Sources ==
- Johnson, Cheryl (1978). Nigerian women and British colonialism: the Yoruba example with selected biographies (Ph.D.). Northwestern University.
