= Oluyole =

Military commander of Oyo Empire

Oluyole (fl. c. mid-1800s AD) was a leader and military commander from the Oyo empire. He rose to fame as Bashorun, a title he subsequently made famous, and was one of the leaders who contributed immensely to the military and economic development of Ibadan (the Oyo empire's capital) during the city's formative years, a period which had its share of tumult and uncertainty.

He was born in Old Oyo to the polygamous family of Olukuoye by Omoba Agbonrin, a daughter of the Alaafin Abiodun.

== Life and Career of the Founding Father of Ibadan ==
Due to the strain caused by the Yoruba civil wars of the 19th century, Old Oyo's senior chiefs fought among themselves over who was to occupy the vacant throne of the Alaafin of Oyo. This led to the collapse of the empire, which in turn forced many Oyo natives to leave their abode in the West African savannah and move towards the thick forests of southern Yorubaland for their relative safety. However, the resulting influx of northern Yorubas known as Oyos to the hinterland led to skirmishes and later wars with the Egbas, who controlled a large chunk of the region. It was during this era that Oluyole rose to prominence. He first gained esteem when he was a member of the victorious coalition that won the Owu wars, which eventually led to the collapse of many Egba towns including Ibadan. As a reward for the prominent role he played in defeating the Egbas at Ipara and Ijebu-Remo, and to strengthen the disparate Oyo nobility which had weakened as a result of the wars, Oluyole was made the Areago of Ibadan. He later created for himself the post of Osi-Kakanfo, the third in command of the Ibadan army.

After the success of the Owu war, a power vacuum emerged in the vital military leadership sphere in Yorubaland. Oluyole took on the challenge in successfully defending his new city, Ibadan, against the regrouped Egbas, the Fulanis and the Dahomeyans. He was later crowned the Oloye Bashorun, a title which made him the military leader of Ibadan and ex officio prime minister of Oyo. By this time, he was considered by many to be a prominent exilarch of the scattered people of Oyo. Possibly only the Alaafin himself had more authority amongst the Oyos.

He was also a successful farmer, with large estates of tuber crops and vegetables. He had one of the largest productive plantations in Ibadan, with indigenes always touring his farm, trying to imitate his innovative planting technique. His effective power could be explained by his will to control economic and social events indirectly, as opposed to through blunt force. For the fear of Oluyole, and also for lack of efficient pricing, many traders usually did not sell their products when he took his to the market.
