= Herbert Macaulay =

Nigerian politician (1864–1946)

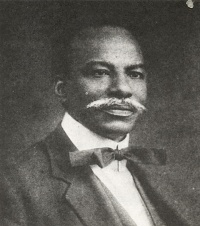
- Born: Olayinka Badmus Macaulay; 14 November 1864 [Lagos]
- Died: 7 May 1946 (aged 81); Lagos, British Nigeria
- Resting place: Ikoyi Cemetery
- Citizenship: Nigeria
- Education: Church Missionary Society Grammar School, Lagos; Plymouth, England
- Alma mater: Royal Institute of British Architects, London; Trinity College of Music
- Occupations: politician, engineer, architect, journalist, boxer musician.
- Years active: 1891–1946
- Known for: Nigerian nationalism
- Political party: Nigerian National Democratic Party; National Council of Nigeria and the Cameroons
- Spouse: Caroline Pratt (m. 1898; died 1899)
- Children: Helena Victoria Maria Macaulay Smith (daughter); Sarah Abigail Idowu Macaulay Adadevoh (daughter); Oliver Ogedengbe Macaulay (son); Frank Montague Macaulay (son); Enitan Macaulay (daughter); Florence Macaulay (daughter); Tokunbo Macaulay(son); Samuel Macaulay (son)
- Parent(s): Thomas Babington Macaulay (father); Abigail Crowther (mother)
- Relatives: Samuel Ajayi Crowther (maternal grandfather); Babatunde Kwaku Adadevoh (grandson)

Olayinka Herbert Samuel Heelas Badmus Macaulay // (14 November 1864 – 7 May 1946) was a Nigerian nationalist, politician, surveyor, engineer, architect, journalist, and musician. Macaulay is considered by many as the founder of Nigerian nationalism.

== Early years ==
Herbert Macaulay was born on 14 November 1864 on Broad Street, Lagos, to the family of Thomas Babington Macaulay and Abigail Crowther. His parents were children of people captured from what is now Nigeria, resettled in Sierra Leone by the British West Africa Squadron, and eventual returnees to present day Nigeria. Thomas Babington Macaulay was one of the sons of Ojo Oriare while Abigail Crowther was the daughter of Bishop Samuel Ajayi Crowther, a descendant of King Abiodun. Thomas Babington Macaulay was the founder of the first secondary school in Nigeria, the CMS Grammar School, Lagos.

== Education ==
Macaulay started primary school in 1869 and from 1877, he was educated at St Paul's Breadfruit School, Lagos and CMS Faji School, Lagos. From 1877 to October 1880, he attended CMS Grammar School, Lagos for his secondary education. He was a student at the school when his father died in 1878. In 1880, he joined his maternal uncle's trade steamer and embarked on a trade and missionary journey across the Niger River visiting Bonny, Lokoja, Gbebe and Brass. After going to a Christian missionary school, he took a job as a clerical assistant and indexer at the Department of Public Works, Lagos. Thereafter, with the support of the colonial administration, Macaulay left Lagos on 1 July 1890 to further his training in England. From 1891 to 1894 he studied civil engineering in Plymouth, England, and was also a pupil of G.D. Bellamy, a borough surveyor and water engineer in Plymouth. In 1893, he became a graduate of the Royal Institute of British Architects, London. Macaulay was also an accomplished musician who received a certificate in music from Trinity College, London and a certificate in violin playing from Music International College, London.

== Career ==
Upon his return to Lagos in September 1893, he resumed work with the colonial service as a surveyor of Crown Lands. He left the service as land inspector in September 1898 due to a growing distaste for the British rule of the Lagos Colony and the position of Yorubaland and the Niger Coast Protectorate as British protectorates. Other authors such as Patrick Dele-Cole have noted the abuse of office allegations (leveled by his British superiors) and pursuit of private gain controversy that clouded Macaulay's resignation as surveyor of Crown Grants. Kristin Mann, citing British Colonial Government dispatches, notes that Macaulay behaved dishonestly, by using "his position as Surveyor of Crown Lands to help friends acquire crown grants and persecute enemies by granting their land to others". She further writes that Macaulay "obtained crown grants under false names and then sold them at a profit". In October 1898, he obtained a licence to practise as a surveyor. As a surveyor, his plans and valuations included E. J. Alex Taylor's house on Victoria Street, Henry Carr's residence in Tinubu, Akinola Maja's house and Doherty Villa in Campos Square.

== Private life ==
Macaulay married Caroline Pratt, daughter of an African Superintendent of Police in December 1898. Their marriage came to an end in August 1899 upon Caroline's death during childbirth and Macaulay is reported to have vowed never to marry again. While Macaulay never remarried in the Church, he had liaisons including Ms. da Souza who returned to Lagos, her ancestral home, from Brazil and lived into her 90s, with whom he had a number of children. Stella Davies Coker, daughter of J. P. L. Davies and Sarah Forbes Bonetta, lived with Macaulay from 1909 until her death in 1916. They had a daughter named Sarah Abigail Idowu Macaulay Adadevoh. Sarah Abigail was named after her maternal grandmother Sarah Forbes Bonetta and her paternal grandmother Abigail Crowther. Macaulay also had several other children Oliver Macaulay, Frank Macaulay, Florence Macaulay, Macaulay, Enitan Macaulay, Florence Macaulay(a younger daughter), Tokunbo Macaulay, Samuel Macaulay, Helena Macaulay. Macaulay was reportedly the first Nigerian to own a motor car.

Though from a family of devout Anglicans, Macaulay embraced indigenous African religious traditions, was superstitious, and dabbled in the practice of magic. His personal papers contain notes from fortune tellers and diviners with instructions around taboos, divinations, sacrifices, and other occult practices. Macaulay was also a member of the Association of Babalawos (Ifa priests) of Lagos.

Macaulay was a great socialite in Victorian Lagos. He organized concerts and film shows (He was among the first Nigerians that brought films to Nigeria by inviting film companies to come to Lagos to exhibit films) at his residence (named "Kirsten Hall" after his German Consul friend Arthur Kirsten) on 8, Balbina Street in Yaba. Macaulay was nicknamed "Wizard of Kirsten Hall" because of his ability to obtain classified information. Macaulay ran a network of informants who he paid handsomely. Many times, minutes from colonial government meetings would be leaked in newspapers that Macaulay was associated with. Whole sections of colonial government files and telegrams can be found in the Macaulay Papers at the Africana section of the Library at the University of Ibadan.

== Opposition to British rule in colonial Nigeria ==
Prior to the beginning of the twentieth century, Macaulay associated with many Lagos socialites, worked as a private surveyor and had a moderate outlook about colonialism. However, by the end of the 1800s, he had begun to veer from his professional and social activities to become a political activist. He joined the Anti-Slavery and Aborigines' Protection Society. Macaulay was an unlikely champion of the masses. A grandson of Ajayi Crowther, the first African bishop of the Niger Territory, he was born into a Lagos that was divided politically into groups arranged in a convenient pecking order – the British authorities who lived in the posh Marina district, the Saros and other slave descendants who lived to the west, and the Brazilians who lived behind the whites in the Portuguese Town. Behind all three lived the real Lagosians, the masses of indigenous Yoruba people, disliked and generally ignored by their privileged neighbours. It was not until Macaulay's generation that the Saros and Brazilians even began to contemplate making common cause with the masses.

Macaulay was one of the first Nigerian nationalists and for most of his life a strong opponent of many colonial policies. As a reaction to claims by the British that they were governing with "the true interests of the natives at heart", he wrote: "The dimensions of "the true interests of the natives at heart" are algebraically equal to the length, breadth and depth of the whiteman's pocket." In 1908 he exposed European corruption in the handling of railway finances and in 1919 he argued successfully for the chiefs whose land had been taken by the colonial government in front of the Privy Council in London. As a result, the colonial government was forced to pay compensation to the chiefs.

In 1909, he came out publicly against the prohibition of spirits into Nigeria which he felt will ultimately lead to reduced government revenues and thereafter increased taxation. Macaulay also found himself in opposition to the colonial government in three major issues that were prominent in Lagos life during 1900–1930. The issues included the proposed water rate, selection of the Oba of Lagos and the Imamate of the Lagos Central Mosque. Macaulay opposed colonial taxation to fund water supply in Lagos on the grounds of taxation without representation. He was a major supporter of the House of Docemo in Lagos. Largely because Lagos was not under indirect rule, the Oba of Lagos unlike many of his counterparts in other areas of the country was stripped of many of his traditional authorities. Macaulay supported the House of Docemo in its opposition to the water rate and colonial acquisition of Lagos lands. He also galvanized the Ilu Committee composed of the Oba of Lagos and traditional chiefs in Lagos to oppose some of the colonial policies.

Macaulay's profile in Lagos was enhanced by the Oluwa Land case. Amodu Tijani Oluwa, a traditional chief, had challenged the compulsory acquisition without compensation of his family land in Apapa. He lost his appeal at the Supreme Court and took the case to the Privy Court Council in London. Macaulay was Oluwa's private secretary in the trip to London. Oluwa's case was supported by the Ilu Committee and the Oba who were interested in the protection of their family lands in Lagos. In London, Macaulay presented himself as Oluwa's private secretary and as a representative of the Oba and in the capacity he made statements which the colonial authorities felt were inimical to their interests. In 1920, the Eleko, Eshungbayi was ostracized by the British because he refused to disavow allegations against the colonial authorities made by Macaulay in London.

To further his political activities, Macaulay co-founded the Nigerian Daily News, a platform he used to write opinion pieces such as Justitia Fiat: The Moral Obligation of the British Government to the House of Docemo. He also wrote a piece titled Henry Carr Must Go. From 1923 to 1938, he became a prominent figure in many important political issues in Lagos including the quinquennial elections into the Legislative Council, triennial elections to the Lagos Town Council, and the headship of the House of Docemo. In his political activities, he relied on the Lagos Daily News, the Lagos Market Women Association led by his ally, Alimotu Pelewura, the House of Docemo and many uneducated Lagosians. His political opinions divided many Lagos elites as he used the Daily News to publicly vilify his opponents and former friends such as Henry Carr. On 24 June 1923, he founded the Nigerian National Democratic Party (NNDP), the first Nigerian political party. The party won all the seats in the elections of 1923, 1928 and 1933. Though the party's major function was to put candidates into the legislative council, it had a broader objective of promoting democracy in Nigeria, increasing higher Nigerian participation in the social, economic and educational development of Nigeria. Although the party wanted to be national in outlook, Macaulay's strength of support was from the House of Docemo and therefore his preoccupation with the defence of the House and his desire to control the party limited the growth of the party.

== Support for British rule in colonial Nigeria ==
In 1931, relations between Macaulay and the British began to improve up to the point that the governor even held conferences with Macaulay. In October 1938, the more radical Nigerian Youth Movement fought and won elections for the Lagos Town Council, ending the dominance of Macaulay and his National Democratic Party.

== Legal problems ==
Macaulay was barred from running for public office because of legal problems - he was convicted twice by the colonial government in Lagos; the first time for fraud, and the second time for sedition.

=== Misappropriation of funds ===
After going into private practice as a surveyor and architect, Macaulay faced some financial difficulty and misappropriated funds from an estate he served as executor for. His actions were uncovered by the authorities who tried him and sentenced him to two years in prison. The historian Patrick Dele-Cole outlines evidence suggesting that Macaulay was unfairly persecuted at his 1913 trial. The prosecuting counsel, one Robert Irving, was Herbert Macaulay's tenant who may have pursued a private vendetta. Macaulay had obtained a court order to evict Robert Irving on 3 December 1912. Additionally, Macaulay's lawyers encountered severe difficulties putting up a solid defense in the course of the case: as an example Macaulay's lawyers were unable to find the police magistrate anywhere in Lagos to obtain bail. Other incidents include the acting Chief Justice fining Macaulay £100 despite the five assessors in the court returning a not guilty verdict. Cole also underscores Macaulay's scrupulous transparency regarding the trust. According to Cole "the will of the testatrix was read in public at the request of Macaulay and the loan he obtained in order to clear the debts of the testatrix was explained to the beneficiaries of the will (Macaulay's niece was the principal beneficiary and she certainly did not engage Irving to prosecute the case), yet he was convicted of 'intent to defraud'". Finally, Cole notes that Macaulay's sentence of five years was "unusually severe".

=== Gunpowder Plot ===
Macaulay's second legal problem centered on what came to be the "Gunpowder Plot Case". When the Privy Council decided that the exiled Oba Eshugbayi Eleko could apply for a writ of habeas corpus from one judge to another, Lagos went wild with excitement because it indicated that the popular Oba would be reinstated. Macaulay's Lagos Daily News published a rumor that because of the Privy Council's decision, the British colonial government in Lagos planned to blow up Oba Eleko's vehicle. For the Gunpowder Plot Case Macaulay was sentenced to six months in prison (at Broad Street Prison) with hard labor without the option for a fine. Macaulay was sixty-four years old at the time of this conviction and the imprisonment increased Macaulay's popularity within Nigeria.

== Feud with Henry Carr ==
It is unclear how the fierce hatred between Macaulay and Henry Carr developed however their disputes are well documented. Carr believed that Macaulay lacked integrity and was exploiting the House of Dosunmu for personal gain. In Carr's diaries, he writes of Macaulay "Among all human monsters with whom we have been brought into contact none has displayed the devilish ingenuity of this man", concluding that Macaulay was a "crooked mind and dangerous fool". Carr abhorred the political reality that Macaulay, who was barred from partaking in politics because of his criminal convictions, was a political kingmaker through Macaulay's control of the NNDP.

The level of the strife between both men was so caustic that in 1924, Macaulay published a malicious account titled "Henry Carr Must Go". In the slanderous publication, Macaulay falsely asserted that Carr's father, Amuwo Carr deserted his wife to settle in Abeokuta as a polygamist. This was untrue considering Amuwo Carr died in Abeokuta of poor health and was nearly blind. Macaulay's vicious attacks on Carr in the press framed the Lagosian public's perception of Carr as shy, distant, and aloof.

Macaulay, on the other hand, believed Carr was behind political divisions in Lagos. He believed Carr was responsible for the government's stubborn position on the Oba Eleko land case. In the pamphlet "Henry Carr Must Go", Macaulay writes of Carr "He has been without any possible doubt whatsoever, the Head Centre, the King Pin, the very mainspring of what his own flatterers choose to call powerful influence or official support behind the renowned articulate minority on whose side Mr. Carr has along flung the whole weight of his official prestige, manifesting thereby an intolerable partisanship...deadly and detestable".

== Twilight years and death ==
In 1944, Macaulay co-founded the National Council of Nigeria and the Cameroons (NCNC) together with Nnamdi Azikiwe and became its president. The NCNC was a patriotic organization designed to bring together Nigerians of all stripes to demand independence. In 1946, Macaulay fell ill in Kano and later died in Lagos. Macaulay's reported last words were:

"Tell the National Council delegates to halt wherever they are for four days for Macaulay and then carry on.
Tell Oged to keep the flag flying"

The leadership of the NCNC went to Azikiwe, who later became the first president of Nigeria. Macaulay was buried at Ikoyi Cemetery in Lagos on 11 May 1946. Nnamdi Azikiwe delivered a funeral oration at Macaulay's burial ceremony and Isaac Babalola Thomas, editor and proprietor of the Akede Eko, was executor of Macaulay's Last Will and Testament.

In 2025, Macaulay received a posthumous pardon from Nigerian president Bola Tinubu.

== Macaulay papers at the University of Ibadan Library ==
Like his political foe Henry Rawlingson Carr whose library and papers are at the University of Ibadan Library, Macaulay's private collection called The Macaulay Papers are at the African Section of the University of Ibadan Library. The Macaulay Papers include a vast assortment of political pamphlets, newspapers, and government documents. They also include personal papers, correspondences, diaries, and photographs.

== Honours ==
Macaulay was featured in the 1 Naira banknote since 1979 until 1991, when the note was replaced by a coin which also portrays Macaulay.

A biopic titled The Herbert Macaulay Affair which covered about 3 decades of his life was made by Nigerian filmmaker, Imoh Umoren and released in 2019.
