= Oshiotse Andrew Okwilagwe =

First Nigerian professor of Publishing

Professor Oshiotse Andrew Okilagwe
- Oshiotse
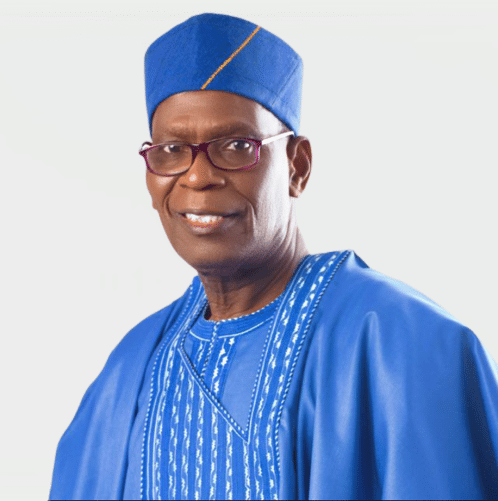
- Born: Oshiotse; 17 July 1951 (age 75); Jattu-Uzairue
- Other name: Andrew
- Education: M.A. in Communication and Language
- Alma mater: University of Ibadan
- Occupation: Librarian
- Employer: Westland University, Iwo
- Notable work: Librarianship, Publishing

Professor Oshiotse Andrew Okwilagwe is a Nigerian librarian, administrator and the Vice-Chancellor of Westland University, Iwo, Osun State and the first Nigerian professor of publishing.

== Early life and education ==
Prof. Okwilagwe (born 17 July 1951) hails from Jattu-Uzairue, Edo State. He holds a B.A. (1979), M.A. in Communication and Language from the University of Ibadan(1983), M.Litt (Publishing Studies) from the University of Stirling (1984). He obtained MLS in Library, Archival and Information Studies (1987), and in 1995, PhD in publishing from the University of Ibadan respectively.

== Publications ==
Prof. Okwilagwe has worked with over 450 authors on various publishing projects in Africa. His research focus is on the influence of Publishing, and Library and Information Science on national development, with over 65 articles published in learned journals.
