= List of higher education institutions in Iwo =

Iwo, Osun in Nigeria has been known for its academic activities both western and Islamic. The city contains 17 higher education institutions: 3 Functional Universities, 3 under construction, four Functional Polytechnics, four Functional Colleges of Education, 6 Functional Colleges of Health Technology and 2 College of Nursing.

== Academy ==
- Lanreleke Sports Academy
- Rovet Football Academy
- Àlàmú Football Academy

== Universities ==
- Bowen University
- Westland University
- National Open University of Nigeria, Iwo Study Center
- Fortress University
- Mercy Medical University
- American University of Science and Technology
- Al Hiddaya University

== Polytechnic ==
- Iwo City Polytechnic
- Wolex Polytechnic
- Offer Center Institute of Agriculture

== Colleges of Education ==
- Federal College of Education
- Al Ummah College of Education

== Colleges of Health Technology ==
- Iwo College of Health Sciences and Technology, Amere Community, Iwoland*
- Royal College of Public Health Technology
- Empire College of Health Technology
- Mercy Medical College of Health Technology
- Excellent College Of Health Technology, Bode Osi
- Al-Awwan College Of Health Science and Technology, Olabiwoninu

== Colleges of Nursing ==
- Mercy College of Nursing
- Skyward College Of Nursing Science, Adeeke
