= Blaxit =

Sociological phenomenon

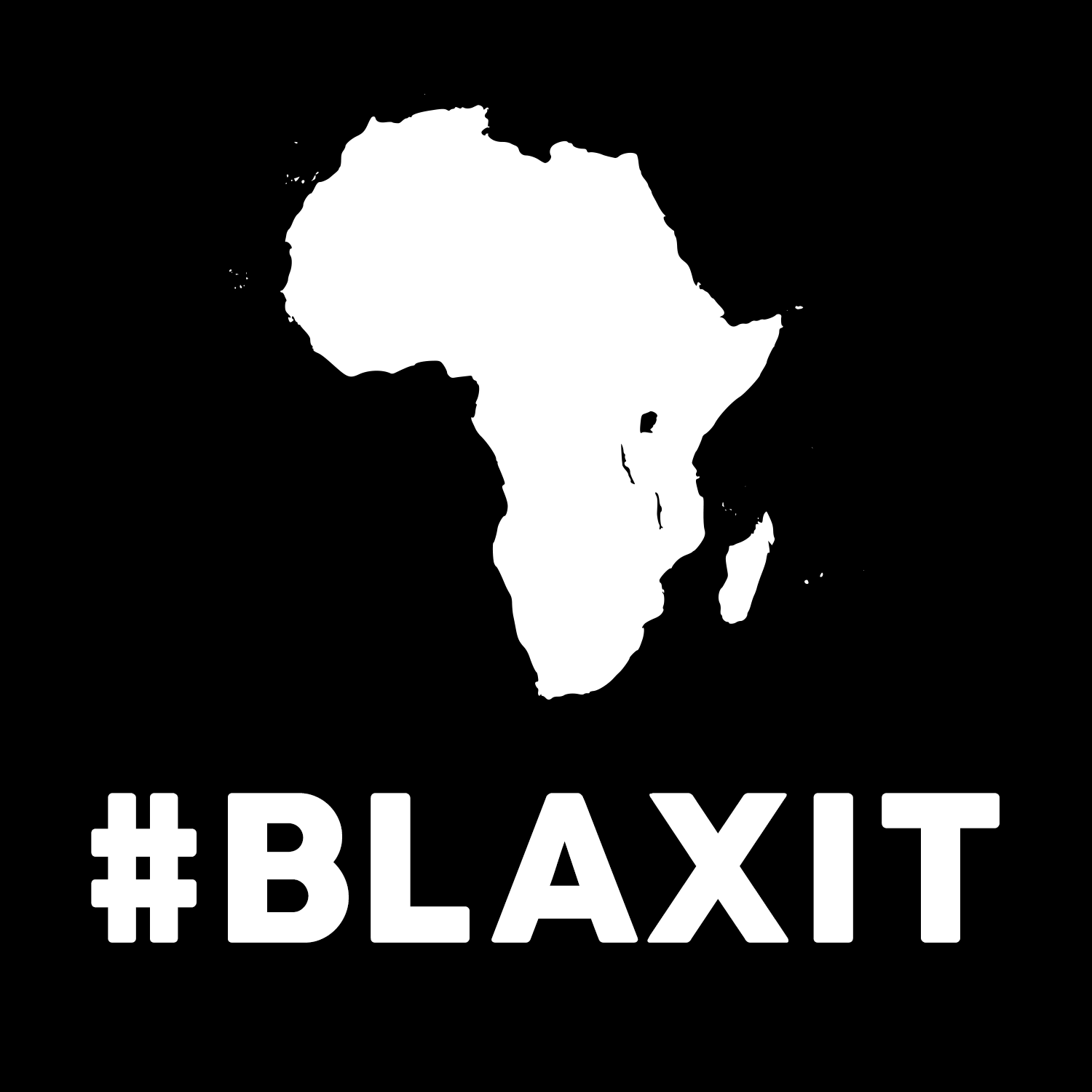
Unofficial logo of Blaxit movement

Blaxit is a social movement that promotes the repatriation of black people from the United States and Europe to Africa. The term now includes all people of African heritage who desire to move to Africa for many reasons, including new economic growth opportunities and cultural reasons.

The term Blaxit was coined in the wake of Brexit by the academic, journalist, and human rights consultant Dr. Ulysses Burley III. The term combines Black and Exit to form Blaxit in the same manner that Brexit describes the British Exit from the European Union.

== History ==
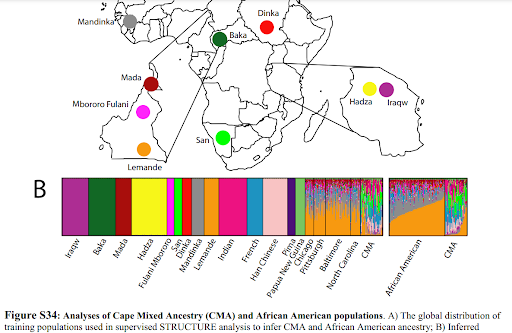
African-American Ancestry Visualized

Since the 2024 re-election of Donald Trump, there has been growing movement of Black Americans looking to relocate to Africa due to changing attitudes in America, and to benefit from the growing new economic opportunities of Africa. Ghana made history in November 2024 as it granted citizenship to 524 people, many being from the USA; some of the American expatriates used the term Blaxit to describe the move.

== Reasons ==
In an interview with USA Today, Kimberly Springer mentioned that there had been an uptick in internet searches for the term "Blaxit" in the wake of the 2016 United Kingdom European Union membership referendum and subsequent 2016 United States presidential election. Kristen West Savali, writing for Essence in January 2020, compared Blaxit to the Great Migration, saying, "it has become increasingly clear that there is no corner of the United States where it is safe to be black." In 2024, Ebony identified a number of social media accounts using the term "Blaxit" to provide advice for Black Americans to move to Africa.

== See also ==
- African-American history
- African Americans in Africa
- African apologies for the Atlantic slave trade
- Afrocentrism
- Afrophobia
- American Colonization Society
- Back-to-Africa movement
- Black Lives Matter
- Black nationalism
- Black separatism
- Black supremacy
- Exodusters
- Marcus Garvey
- Negrophobia
- Pan-Africanism
- Perpetual foreigner
- Racism against African Americans
