= Aiyedire =

- LGA
- Interactive map of Aiyedire
- Location in Nigeria
- Coordinates: 7°34′N 4°14′E
- Country: Nigeria
- State: Osun State
- Headquarter: Ileogbo

Government
  - Local Government Chairman: Adigun Adejare

Area
  - Total: 262 km^{2} (101 sq mi)

Population (2006 census)
  - Total: 76,309
  - Density: 291/km^{2} (754/sq mi)
- Time zone: UTC+1 (WAT)
- 3-digit postal code prefix: 232
- Area code: LGB
- ISO 3166 code: NG.OS.AI

Aiyedire is a Local Government Area, one of the thirty Local Government Areas in Osun State, Nigeria. Its headquarters is located at 1, Col Ogunkanmi Road in the town of Ileogbo at 7°47′00″N 4°12′00″E. Hon. Adigun Adejare is the current chairman of the council. The local government was named Iwo South Local Government on establishment which was later renamed Aiyedire Local Government which is its present name today. The local government was carved from the old Iwo local government which was in Araromi in Iwo.

== Administration ==
=== Aiyedire South Local Council Development Area (LCDA) ===
Aiyedire South Local Council Development Area (LCDA) was created out of Aiyedire for administrative convenience, better development planning and to bring government closer to the grassroot. The LCDA is created by the Government of Osun State and is responsible for the funding of the council. The LCDA is headed by a chairman, vice chairman and other executive and legislative branches similar to the federally recognized local councils. The current chairman of the council is Sunday Owoade Atidade.

=== Districts ===
Aiyedire Local Government Area is divided into four districts namely Ile Ogbo, Kuta, Oke Osun (Alabata), and Olupona. For efficient administration purposes, Aiyedire South, a Local Council Development Area (LCDA) was created out of Aiyedire and headed by Hon. Olufemi Idowu.

=== Geography ===
This Local Government Area is located in the western axis of Osun state. It is bounded by Ejigbo, Ola Oluwa, Irewole, Ayedaade and Iwo Local Government Areas. It has an area of 262 km^{2} and a population of 75,846 at the 2006 national census. It features two distinct seasons, the dry and rainy seasons. The average temperature of Aiyedire is put at 28.5 °C while the humidity of the area is estimated at 60 percent. Wind speed across Aiyedire is put at 10 km/h.

== Education ==
All the towns in the local government have their own community grammar school. And the local government has one functioning institution and which one is under construction;

1. Offer Centre Institute of Agriculture, oluponna;
2. Ilegbo university
3. Lanreleke Sports Academy.

== Demographics ==
At the 2006 census, Aiyedire had a population of 76,309 (2006 estimates), and had grown to 105,100 (2016 projections). The 2006 estimates consist of the following:

Gender	Population
Male	38,299
Female	38,010

Age groups	Population
0 - 14	29,215
15 - 64	44,018
65+	3,076

=== Political wards ===
Aiyedire has ten political wards namely Ileogbo i, Ileogbo ii, Ileogbo iii, Ileogbo iv, Kuta i, Kuta ii, Oke-osun, Oluponna 1, Oluponna 1i, and Oluponna 1ii. Aiyedire is a part of the famed Iwo Kingdom.

== Economy ==
=== Agriculture ===
Farming is the predominant economic activity. Cocoa is a major cash crop cultivated in the area solely or in combination with other agricultural crops such as coffee, cassava, palm oil, kola nut, maize, pineapple and yam.

=== Trade ===
Trade is an important feature of the economic lives of the people with markets such as the Alaya main market and the Mosun market providing access for the exchange of a wide range of goods and services. Hunting and crop cultivation are other important economic enterprises engaged by the locals.

=== Postal code ===
The postal code of the area is 232.

== Socio-economic ==
=== Heritage ===
==== Sacred Idi-Oore Tree ====
The tree is famed a pointer to the seating of Ileogbo, the headquarters of Ayedire Local Government in Osun State. The tree life span is uncertain as the first settlers are younger than it. The tree was located circa 1840 subsequent to a spiritual consultation with oracle by Prince Kuseela, the only surviving monarch from the war between Fulani and Ileogbo in 1822 where they were defeated. In 1840, as tranquility returned, it triggered Kuseela, to consult an oracle for a new abode as the former settlement was desolate. The oracle divined that he stops, with his entourage where ever he found a tree tied with white cloth. It was divined that he, with his people, should organize a prosperous kingdom. Prince Kuseela contacted the tree, weeded its surroundings, settled near at Akinmoyero`s compound and invited people from far and near and subsequently multiplied to about eighty-two compounds with numerous suburbs.

Tradition had it that the tree is manned by a male (Baba Abore) and a female (Iya Abore) appointed on the advice of the king. One of the past Iya Abore from Olukoun`s compound nicknamed the tree Alhaja Jabaru. This name is not unconnected with the female spirit the tree is said to shelter. Some traditionalists considered Oore as a strong protection against any havoc in Ileogbo. The tree does not shed its leaves under its shade.

=== Cultural activities ===
==== Anlugbua Festival ====
Anlugbua is celebrated annually. Anlugbua Akindele, a famous hunter and warrior was a progenitor that led his people from Orile-Owu to Owu-Kuta, where they are presently settled. He left Orile-Owu because he was not given the chance to reign after his father’s passage. His younger brother was made to ascend the throne, which angered him. So, he left and later settled in a place called Ikutamiti (I evaded death). It is Ikutamiti that was shortened to Kuta. After a reign of 300 years, he decided to sink to the ground, instead of dying physically. The spot where he entered into the ground is where is annually converged to celebrate. The place is now a local historical site.

The shrine is a sacred groove about three kilometres away from the town and inaccessible by vehicle and tucked inside the Anlugbua forest. Some of the rites are the sacrifices of live ram and dog in addition to pounded yam and okro/ogbono soup at the shrine. Persons who wear certain tribal marks called keke are forbidden from entering Anlugbua’s shrine.

== Notable indigenes ==
- Mufutau Oloyede Abdul-Rahmon - Professor of Arabic and Islamic Studies.
