= Mufutau Oloyede Abdul-Rahmon =

Nigerian academic

Mufutau Oloyede Abdul-Rahmon is a Nigerian professor of Arabic and Islamic studies who is from Ile-Ogbo, Aiyedire Local Government Area of Osun State, Nigeria.

== Education ==
He had his primary school education at St Mary African Church Primary School, Ile-Ogbo, in 1966. He also studied at Mahad Shamsu Suudil Islam Arabic School, Ile-Ogbo, between 1967 and 1971. He then traveled to Lagos State to have his secondary education at Exam Success Correspondence College in Lagos from 1973 to 1976. For his tertiary education, he studied at the University of Ibadan between 1976 and 1989 to have various certificates including his professorship.

== Qualifications and year ==
	Qualifications	Year
1.	Pry school Certificate	1966
2.	GCE O/L	1976
3.	GCE O/L	1977
4.	Certificate in Arabic & Islamic Studies	1977
5.	B.A. Arabic Language and Literature, University of Ibadan	1981
6.	M.A. Arabic and Islamic Studies, University of Ibadan	1983
7.	Ph.D. Arabic and Islamic Studies, University of Ibadan	1989

== Appointment ==
1. Department Examination Coordinator between 1986 and 1992
2. Department Postgraduate Coordinator between 1989 and 1994
3. Assistant Warden, Obafemi Awolowo Hall between 1991 and 1993
4. Member, Senate Curriculum Committee representing Faculty of Arts between 1998 and 2001
5. Ag. Head, Department of Arabic & Islamic Studies between 1996 and 1998, 2000-2002 and 2006–2008
6. Member, Anti-Cultism Campaign Committee 2007-till date
7. Member, University Inter-Religious Committee 2010-till date
8. Member, Board of Arts Studies between 1996 and 1998, 2000-2002 and 2006-till date
9. Member, Senate of the University of Ibadan 1996–1998, 2000-2002 and 2006-till date
10. Chief Imam, University Central Mosque 2006–2025

== Other appointments ==
1. Federal Welfare Officer on Muslim Pilgrimage 1988
2. Member, Oyo and Osun States Advisory Committee on NDE between 1991 and 1995
3. Member, National Assembly Election Tribunal, Plateau State in 1992
4. Secretary, Oyo State Committee on Muslim Festivals between 1989 and 1991
5. Foundation Imam, Oyo State Government House Mosque between 1990 and 1991
6. Member National Technical Working Committee on the Integration of Quranic Schools into UBE between 2002 and 2007
7. Member, Committee of Experts to Write National Report on Madrasah Education in Nigeria in 2010
8. Member, Committee of Experts to Harmonise Curricula of Tshangaya Arabic Schools in Nigeria 2011

== Publications and articles ==
He has published many articles both in journals and other publications. Some of them are:

1. Abdul-Rahmon, M.O. (Ed) (1992): “Thoughts in Islamic Law and Jurispudence”. UIMGA Publications, Ibadan.
2. Abdul-Rahmon, M.O. (Ed) (2008): "Perspectives in Islamic Law and Jurisprudence". Essays in Honour of Justice Dr Muri Okunola (JCA), Ibadan Polygraphic Ventures.
3. Abdul-Rahmon, M.O. (2010): “A Reader in Islamic Studies”. Insight Publications, Ibadan.
4. Abdul-Rahmon, M.O. (1989): “A Re-appraisal of Arabic as a tool for Adult literacy in Nigeria”. In Michael Omolewa, E.M. in Osuji and Akpo Vire O. (eds.) Retrospect and Renewal: The State of Adult Education in Africa. Dakar: UNESCO-BREDA 178–186.
5. Abdul-Rahmon, M.O. (2001): “Shariah in our daily life: The Islamic rules on Hygienic living and feeding habits.” In Abdul-Rahmon M.O. (ed) Perspectives in Islamic Law and Jurisprudence. Essays in Honour of Justice (Dr.) Muritala Okunnola (JCA). Ibadan: Polygraphic Ventures, 94–111.
6. Abdul-Rahmon, M.O. and Aderinoye, R.A. (2002): “Issues in Islamic Education: The Nigeria Perspectives.” In Samuel A. Ayodele (ed.) Strategies for teaching Secondary Schools in Nigeria. Ibadan: Power-House Publication, 307–318.
7. Abdul-Rahmon, M.O. (2003): “Nadhrat Tarikhiyyah fi Tatawur ta’lim al-Lughat al-‘Arabiyyah wa dirasat al-Islamiyyah fi wilayat Oyo al-Sabiqah.” In Amidu Sanni (ed.) “An Unfamiliar Guest in a Familiar Household: Arabic and Islamic Studies in Honour of Professor Isaac A. Ogunbiyi. Lagos: Debo Prints, 188-203.
8. Abdul-Rahmon, M.O. (2008): “Perspectives in the Teaching and Learning of Arabic and Islamic Studies in the South West of Nigeria”. In Z.I. Oseni (ed) Fluorescence of Arabic and Islamic Studies in Nigeria. Festschrift in Memory of Prof. W.O.A. Narisu, Ibadan: Heinemann Educational books Nigeria Ltd. (HEBN) 1–15.
9. Abdul-Rahmon, M.O. and I.O. Uthman (2011): “Work Ethics: The Islamic Perspective”. In Aduke Adebayo's Work Ethics and the University of Ibadan. Senate Research Grant.
10. Abdul-Rahmon, M.O. (1998): “Religion and Family: The Islamic Foundation”. Gbola Aderibigbe and Deji Aiyegbogun (eds) Religion and Family. Proceedings of National Conference of the Nigerian Association for the study of Religions and Education pp. 67–73. Ibadan.
11. Abdul-Rahmon, M.O. (2002): ”Muslim Youth and Political Consciousness in Yorubaland of Nigeria”. Proceedings of the WAMY International Conference on Muslim Youth and globalization, Riyadh, Saudi Arabia. 273–289.
12. Abdul-Rahmon, M.O. (2002): “Utilization of Arabic and Islamic Diplomates for Social Integration in Nigeria”. In L.M. Adetona Prospects for students of Diploma in Arabic and Islamic Studies. Proceedings of the National Work-shop on Utilization of Diploma Certificate in Arabic & Islamic Studies, Department of Foreign and African Languages, Lagos State, University 1–9.
13. Abdul-Rahmon, M.O. (2006): “Towards the issue of Discipline and Patriotism in the Nigerian polity: The Islamic perspective”. In I.L. Akintola (ed) Economic and Political Reconstruction in Nigeria: The Islamic Perspectives, Lagos: Proceedings of the International Conference of World Assembly of Muslim Youth held at Lagos State University pp. 83–89.
14. Abdul-Rahmon, M.O. (2007): “Athar al-Lughat wa Taqalid al-Yarbar fi kitabat ‘Ulama al-Taqlidiyyah fi gharb Nijiriyyah, in Ishamat al-Lughat al-Arabiyyah. Proceedings of 1st International Conference of Arabic Language, Faculty of Arabic Language, International Islam University of Malaysia, Kuala Lumpur.
15. Abdul-Rahmon, M.O. (2008): "Arabic and Islamic Studies in the South-West Nigeria: Challenges and Prospects". Proceedings of Bi-Annual Conference of Teachers of Arabic & Islamic Studies, Ekiti State.
16. Abdul-Rahmon, M.O. (1985): Annotated Translation of Alfa Katibi's Risalat al-Tahni’ah. Al-Fikr: Journal of Arabic and Islamic Studies, No. 6, pp. 54–74. (University of Ibadan).
17. Abdul-Rahmon, M.O. (1986): In concept of Faqir in Islamic Mysticism: An Appraisal Al-Fikr: Journal of Arabic and Islamic Studies, No. 7, 72–81.
18. Abdul-Rahmon, M.O. (1987): A study of the Historical Background of the growth of Islam and Arabic Scholarship in Ibadan Al-Fikr: Journal of Arabic and Islamic Studies, No. 8, 56–67. (University of Ibadan).
19. Abdul-Rahmon, M.O. (1989): The Emergence and Focus of Mada’ih ‘ahl-al-Bayt in the Political Poetry of Umayyad Arabic Literature. Al-Fikr, Journal of Arabic and Islamic Studies, No 10, 37-59. (University of Ibadan).
20. Abdul-Rahmon, M.O. (1989): An appraisal of the style and features of the early Arabic works of Ibadan ‘Ulama’. JARS: Journal of Arabic and Religious Studies, Vol. 6, 1–14. (University of Ilorin).
21. Abdul-Rahmon, M.O. (1990): An Appraisal of Qasidat al- Hadithah li ‘Abd Rauf ‘ala jaddihi al-Imam as an Arabic source of ‘Predestined Muslim’ in Yorubaland and of the biography of Imam Harun Gege. Al-Fikr, Journal of Arabic and Islamic Studies, No 11, 110–120.(University of Ibadan).
22. Abdul-Rahmon, M.O. (1991): Ahmad al-Rufa’i's Hujjat ‘Asatidhatina: Text, Translation and Content Analysis. Al-Fikr, Journal of Arabic and Islamic Studies, No 12, 60-70. (University of Ibadan).
23. Abdul-Rahmon, M.O. (1992): Aspect of Literary Acculturation in the Arabic poetry of Ibadan Ulama” JARS: Journal of Arabic and Religious Studies, Vol. VII, 25–36. (University of Ilorin).
24. Abdul-Rahmon, M.O. (1992): A study of the stylistic strategy in the structure of Fogy, Satire and Eulogy of Arabic Poetry of the Traditional Yoruba ‘Ulama’. Al-Fikr, Journal of Arabic and Islamic Studies, No 13, 47–58.
25. Abdul-Rahmon, M.O. (1992): An Account of the Growth of Arabic Literary Activities in Ibadan. OYE: Ogun Journal of Arts, Vol. VI, 73–80. (Faculty of Arts Ogun State University).
26. Abdul-Rahmon, M.O. (1993): A study of the Concept of Morality in Al-Adab al-Arabi, Al-Fikr, Journal of Arabic and Islamic Studies No 14, 1–12.
27. Abdul-Rahmon, M.O. (1994): An Approach to Stylistic Appraisal of Arabic Poetry of Nigerian ‘Ulama’. Islamic Research Institute Vol. 34, 315–325. (Islamabad, Pakistan)
28. Abdul-Rahmon, M.O. (1994): A Critique of Ahmad Shawqi's Concept of Islamic Morals as depicted in his Religious Themes Al-Fikr, Journal of Arabic and Islamic Studies, No 16, 20–31. (University of Ibadan).
29. Abdul-Rahmon, M.O. (1995): Dirasatun Mawdu’iyyah, Wa tahqiq ‘ala al-qasidat al-Hadithah ‘ala ‘Imam Harun al – Yarbawi. Al-Fikr, Journal of Arabic and Islamic Studies, No 15, 59–70. (University of Ibadan).
30. Abdul-Rahmon, M.O. (1998): Ahmad Shawqi: The Making of Arab Shakespeare and the Character – moulding Influences. Ibadan Journal of Humanistic Studies, No. 8, 102-111 (Faculty of Arts, University of Ibadan).
31. Abdul-Rahmon, M.O. (2000): Trends in Shari’ah Library Works in Nigeria. NATAIS, Journal of Nigerian Association of Teachers of Arabic and Islamic Studies, Vol. 5, pp. 28–36. (University of Lagos).
32. Abdul-Rahmon, M.O. (2000): Trends in Madh Themes of the Classical Arabic Poetry. Obitun: Journal of the Humanities, Vol. 3, No. 2, 100–107. (Faculty of Arts, University of Ado-Ekiti)
33. Abdul-Rahmon, M.O. (2001): A study of the Moroccan Influence on the Arabic Scholarship in Yorubaland of Nigeria. Al-Hadarah; Journal of Arabic and Islamic Studies, Vol. 4. p. 83-92. (Lagos State University)
34. Abdul-Rahmon, M.O. (2002): Sharafadin al-Busiri: An African Poet in the making of al-Burdan. Orisun: Journal of Arabic & Islamic Studies, Ago-Iwoye, Vol. 1, 74–81. (Olabisi Onabanjo University).
35. Abdul-Rahmon, M.O. (2006): Arabic writing on Religious Tradition in modern society: A case study of Ibadan, South-western Nigeria. Journal of Oriental and African Studies Vol. 15 (Athens, Greece).
36. Abdul-Rahmon, M.O. (2007): A Study of the Development of the Curriculum of Traditional Arabic learning among the Yoruba. Journal of the Religious Education Vol. 1 (University of Lagos).
37. Abdul-Rahmon, M.O. (2002): The Effects of Language and Culture on the Arabic Writing of Traditional Yoruba Ulama. Accepted for publication in Journal of the Faculty of Arabic Language, (The Islamic University of Gaza, Palestine).
38. Abdul-Rahmon, M.O. (1989): Tarikh al-Adab al-Arabi fi Asr al-Abbasi. Ibadan: Centre for External Studies, 1-200 (University of Ibadan).
39. Abdul-Rahmon, M.O. (2010): The Future in Our Footprints; A Case Study of Professor I.A.B Balogun: 3rd Memorial Lecture in Honour of Professor I.A.B Balogun. (IAB Balogun Islamic Foundation, Lagos).
40. Abdul-Rahmon, M.O. (2005): Managing Spirituality and Materialism in a World at Cross-Roads. Abdul-Azeez Islamic Foundation, Lagos.
