= Efunroye Tinubu =

Nigerian aristocrat (c. 1810–1887)

Chief Efunroye Tinubu
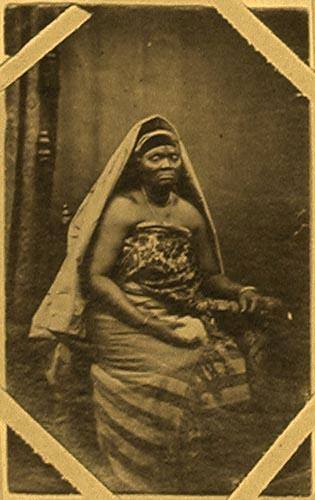
- Tinubu in 1886
- Born: Ẹfúnpọ̀róyè Ọ̀ṣuntinúbú c. 1810; Egbaland, Yorubaland
- Died: 1887; Abeokuta
- Resting place: Abeokuta, Ogun State, Nigeria
- Occupations: Merchant, slave trader
- Spouse(s): Adele Ajosun, amongst others

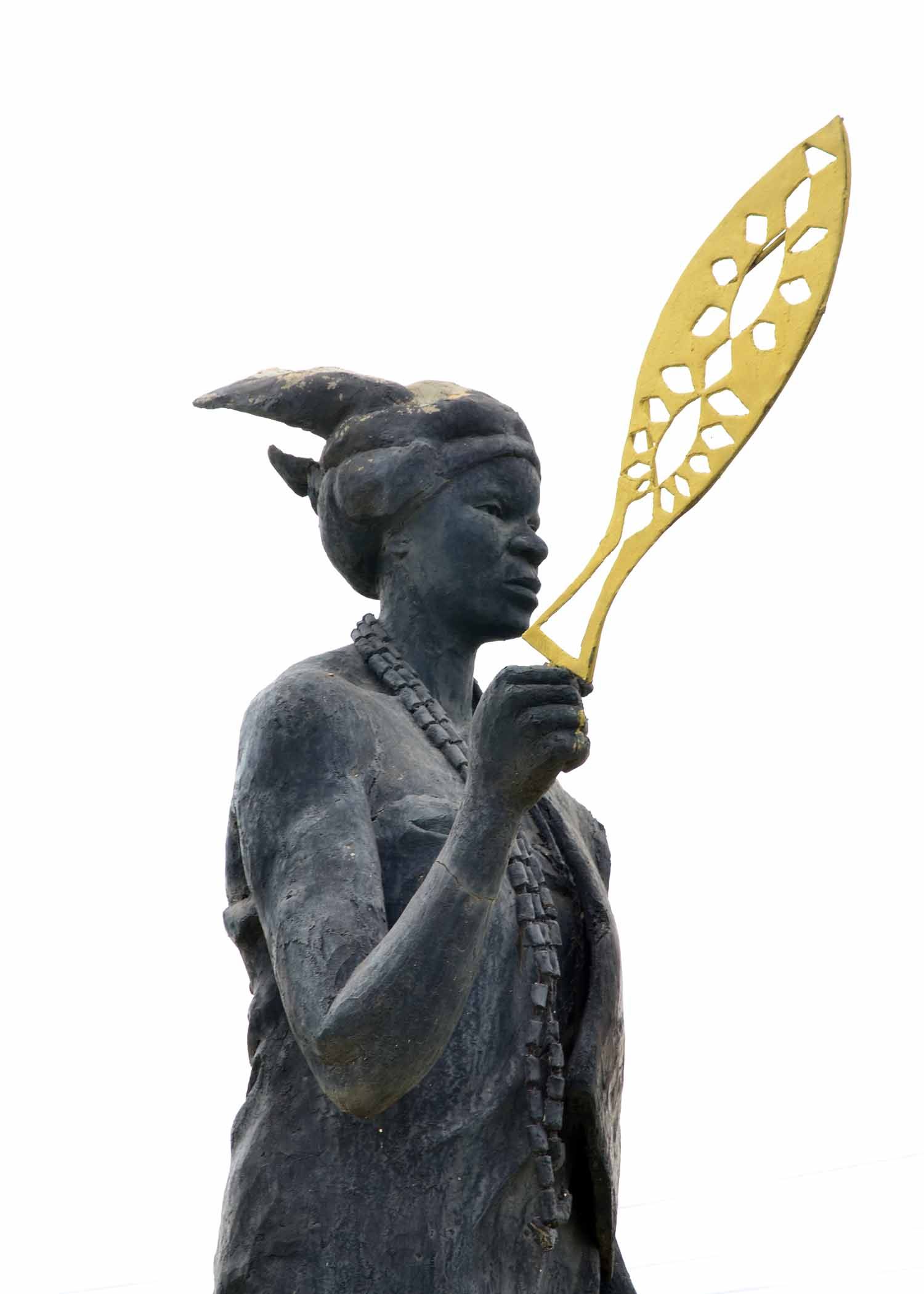

Efunroye Tinubu (c. 1810 – 1887), born Ẹfúnpọ̀róyè Ọ̀ṣuntinúbú, was a powerful Yoruba female aristocrat, merchant, and slave trader in pre-colonial and colonial Nigeria.

She was a politically and economically influential figure in Lagos during the reigns of Obas (monarchs) Adele, Dosunmu, Oluwole, and Akitoye, helping the latter two Obas gain political power. She married Oba Adele and used his connections to establish a successful trade network with European merchants in tailor, tobacco, salt, cotton, palm oil, coconut oil, and firearms. She allegedly owned over 360 personal slaves.

Following British victory in the Reduction of Lagos, the British removed Oba Kosoko from his throne and replaced him with Akitoye, who was backed by Tinubu. The British had Akitoye sign the 1852 Treaty Between Great Britain and Lagos, which required Lagosians to abolish the Atlantic slave trade. However, Tinubu covertly persisted in operating the slave trade with Brazilian and European merchants, in violation of the treaty, and Akitoye willingly permitted this. British consul Benjamin Campbell denounced Tinubu's economic hegemony over Lagos and her secret slave-trading, and she came into conflict with the British and rival Lagos merchants. Following the ascendancy of Oba Dosunnu, Dosunmu exiled Tinubu to Abeokuta under Campbell's pressure after Tinubu plotted unsuccessful conspiracies to remove British influence from Lagos and assassinate Campbell. While in Abeokuta, she helped supply the city with munitions during its victorious war against the Kingdom of Dahomey, thus earning her the chieftaincy title of the Iyalode of the Egbas.

She died in Abeokuta in 1887. The landmark Tinubu Square in Lagos, Nigeria, was named after her and also has a statue of her. She also has a statue in Abeokuta, Nigeria.

== Life and career ==
=== Early life ===
Tinubu, born Ẹfúnpọ̀róyè "Purity is the source of honor" Ọ̀ṣúntinúubú "Ọ̀ṣun has came within the deep waters" was born in the town of Ijokodo (now known as Ojokodo), located in the 'Egba Forest' in 1805 or 1810. Ijokodo was an Egba Gbagura town. Her father's name was Olumosa, an Egba man, who was originally from the town of Ido, the capital of the Egba Gbagura. When Ido was destroyed, the town of Ibadan was later resettled on the location, and Olumosa moved to Ijokodo. Olumosa was a worshipper of Obatala, the Yoruba creator god, and god of purity, hence the "Ẹfun" in Tinubu's name, as Ẹfun (white chalk), is a symbol of Obatala.

Tinubu's mother was Níjẹ̀ẹ́dé (or Líjẹ̀ẹ́dé) "The one who answers me has come" was of mixed ancestry. Nijeede's father Oguntayo was from the town of Iwo, while her mother Osunsola was Owu. This is likely why it is stated that Tinubu was of Owu ancestry. Osunsola was a trader who sold herbs, roots, and skins. Because of that, she was very affluent and often went to the coast (Badagry) by boat to trade. It is allegedly during one of Osunsola's trips that her daughter Nijeede went into labor, and gave birth to Tinubu. This is why she was named Ọ̀ṣúntinúubú, since it was believed Ọ̀ṣun, the goddess of the Ọ̀ṣun river they were traveling on, had provided them a daughter.

Tinubu was the eldest daughter of her father. Her mother Nijeede was first married to a man named Degolu (son of Fajinmi and Osunkoolu), and had a child, Tinubu's oldest brother, Sobowale. When Degolu died, Nijeede married Tinubu's father Olumosa, becoming his second wife, and they had Tinubu. Olumosa had two other wives, his first wife had a son named Okukan. Olumosa's third wife then had Tinubu's younger brother, Akinwunmi. She is the only known daughter of her father.

In 1821, as a young girl, the Egba and Owu regions were plunged into war when the Owu Kingdom fell, as part of the larger Yoruba Wars. Many towns, including Ijokodo were destroyed, and their family had to flee to avoid being captured and enslaved, as many Egba and Owu people were. They eventually, under the leadership of Sodeke, moved to the new town of Abeokuta in 1830. By that time, she had married an Owu man, and had two sons. Not too long after, her mother Nijeede died Shortly after her mother died, Tinubu's Owu husband died. She then remarried the exiled Oba Adele Ajosun in 1833 who, while visiting Abeokuta, was allegedly charmed by Tinubu, who was a young and eligible widow. She moved with the exiled Oba to Badagry, which was traditionally the place of refuge for Lagos monarchs. At Badagry, using her trading experience taught by her grandmother Osunsola, she exploited Adele's connections to build a formidable business trading in tobacco, salt, and slaves.

=== Lagos ===
The exiled Oba Adele was still in Badagry when his successor, Oba Idewu, died. Prince Kosoko, Idewu Ojulari's brother, was a major contender for the now vacant throne. Eletu Odibo, the chief kingmaker, thwarted Kosoko's aspiration and Adele was invited by him to become Oba again. Tinubu accompanied Adele to Lagos, but the Oba died 2 years later. After Adele's death in 1837, Tinubu reportedly supported Oluwole (her stepson) in his bid for the Obaship of Lagos over that of Kosoko's.

Oba Oluwole had recurring conflicts with Kosoko, who felt that he was the true heir to the throne. Consequently, Kosoko was banished to Ouidah. During Oluwole's reign, Tinubu remarried one Yesufu Bada, alias Obadina, who was Oluwole's war captain and with the support of Oluwole, Tinubu and Yesufu's trading activities in Egbaland grew.

When Oluwole died in 1841, Tinubu supported Akitoye (her former brother-in-law) in his bid for the Obaship over Kosoko's. After Akitoye emerged Oba, he granted Tinubu favorable commercial concessions. Against the wish of his chiefs, Akitoye invited Kosoko back to Lagos and tried to placate him. Soon thereafter, Kosoko dislodged Akitoye from the throne. Considering Tinubu's alliance with Akitoye, she and other Akitoye supporters fled to Badagry when Kosoko became Oba in 1845. As a wealthy woman, Madam Tinubu was able to influence economic and political decisions during her time in Badagry. She tried to rally Akitoye's supporters to wage war against Kosoko.

In December 1851 and under the justification of abolishing slavery, the British bombarded Lagos, dislodged Kosoko from the throne, and installed a more amenable Akitoye as Oba of Lagos. Though Akitoye signed a treaty with Britain outlawing the slave trade, Tinubu subverted the 1852 treaty and secretly traded slaves for guns with Brazilians and Portuguese traders. Further, she obtained a tract of land from Akitoye which now constitutes part of the present-day Tinubu Square and Kakawa Street. Later, a conflict developed between Tinubu and some slave traders including Possu, a Kosoko loyalist. Consequently, Possu, Ajenia, and other traders tried to instigate an uprising against Akitoye because of Tinubu's influence in Lagos. In the interest of peace, Benjamin Campbell, the British Consul in Lagos, asked Akitoye to exile Tinubu. After Akitoye died, Tinubu returned to Lagos and gave her support to his successor, Dosunmu. Under Dosunmu's reign Tinubu had a massive security force composed of slaves and she sometimes executed orders usually given by the king. As a result, Dosunmu grew wary of her influence in Lagos. A new development was the colonial government's support for migrants from Brazil and Sierra Leone to settle in Lagos. Many of the migrants, also called Saro and Aguda, were favored by the British in commerce and soon began dominating legitimate trade in Lagos.

In 1855, when Campbell traveled to England, Tinubu tried to influence Dosunmu to limit the influence of the returnees. Dosunmu was noncommittal to her request and consequently, Tinubu was alleged to have played a part in an uprising against the returnees in which her husband, Yesufu Bada, was a major participant. When Campbell returned in 1856, he asked Dosunmu to banish Tinubu. In May 1856, Tinubu was banished to Abeokuta.

=== Abeokuta ===
In Abeokuta, Tinubu traded in arms and supplied Abeokuta with munitions in the war against Dahomey. Her activities in the war earned her the chieftaincy title of the Iyalode of all of Egbaland. While in Abeokuta, she allegedly opposed colonial policies in Lagos. In 1865, a fire engulfed the shops of some traders including some of her properties in Abeokuta. This doesn't appear to have weakened her financially, however. Tinubu became involved in Abeokuta king-making activities as well, supporting Prince Oyekan over Ademola for the Alake of Egbaland's title in 1879. Tinubu appears to have had another marriage with one Momoh Bukar, an Arabic scholar. Momoh's children from other wives later adopted the Tinubu name.

=== Views on slavery ===
The often cited biography titled Madame Tinubu: Merchant and King-maker, authored by Nigerian historian Oladipo Yemitan, paints her views regarding slave trading.

On one occasion, during her final sojourn in Abeokuta, she was alleged to have sold a young boy into slavery and was accused of it. When arraigned before Ogundipe Alatise over the matter, she reportedly explained: 'I have a large house-hold and I must feed them well. I need money to do that, that's why'.

— Oladipo. Yemitan, 'Madame Tinubu: Merchant and King-maker'

Another section of Yemitan's Tinubu biography, referred to as the Amadie-Ojo Affair, captures a slave trading deal gone sour in 1853 (notably after the 1852 Treaty abolishing slavery in Lagos) wherein Tinubu tells another slave trader (Domingo Martinez) that "she would rather drown the slaves [20 in number] than sell them at a discount".

== Relations with British colonial officials ==
Tinubu’s influence in Lagos often brought her into conflict with British colonial authorities. According to Akinwumi Isola’s dramatic account of her life, she openly challenged the British consul’s interference in Lagos affairs, insisting that he had no right to dictate to the local population.

Her opposition to the consul’s policies, combined with her strong support for her husband Bada and her ability to mobilize market women, led to tensions with Oba Dosunmu and the colonial administration. After a market riot in which Tinubu was accused of instigating unrest, Dosunmu acting on the consul’s advice ordered her banishment from Lagos.

In the mid-nineteenth century, her support for Akintoye also placed her at odds with the colonial administration, which at times favored rival factions in Lagos. Her political maneuvering and ability to mobilize wealth and networks made her a significant figure whom the British had to reckon with in their consolidation of Lagos.

Although protests followed from market women and other supporters, Tinubu eventually left Lagos for Abeokuta. Her departure marked a turning point, as British officials gradually increased their control over Lagos politics and commerce in the absence of her influence.

== Death and legacy ==
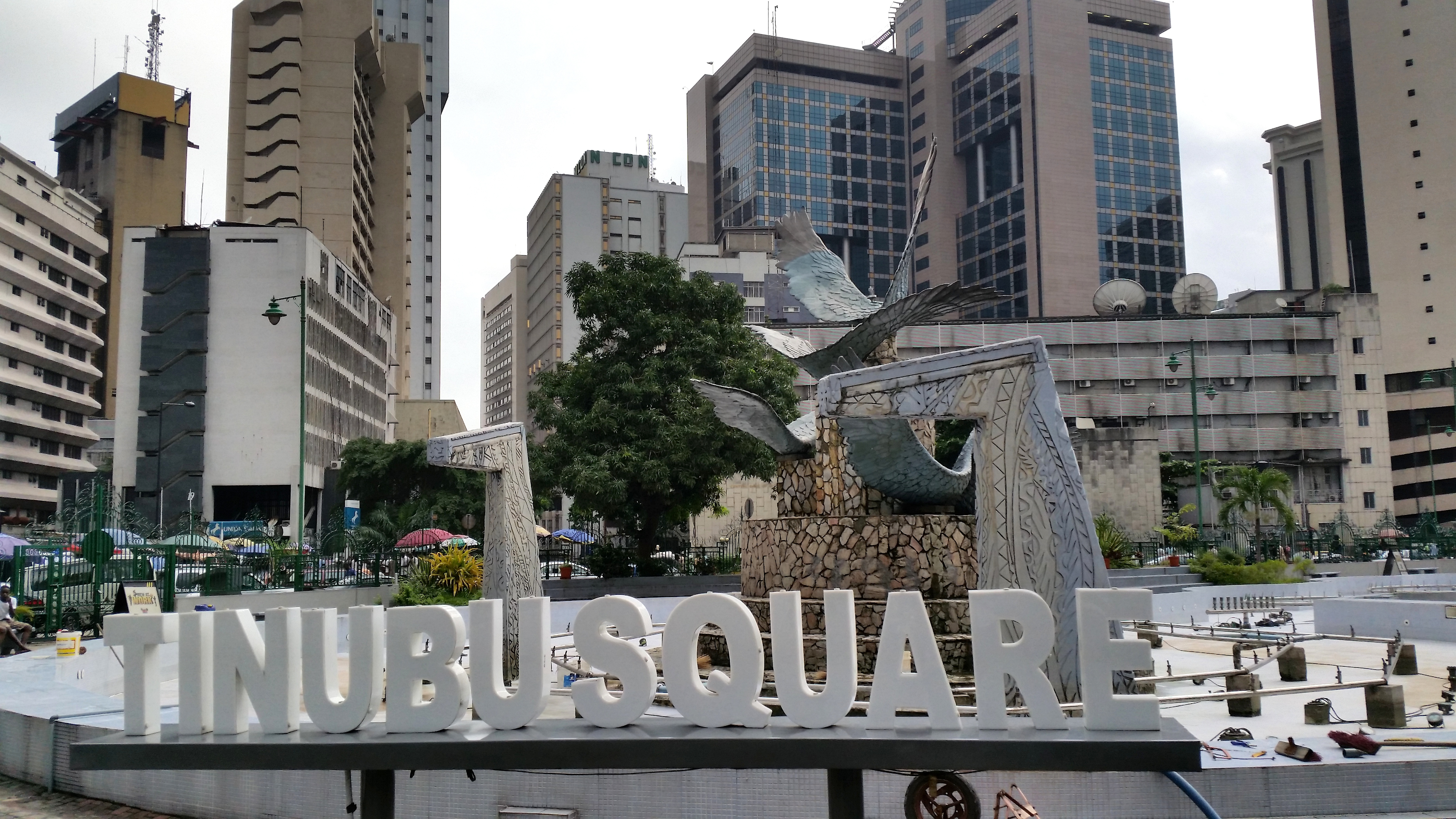
Tinubu Square in 2014

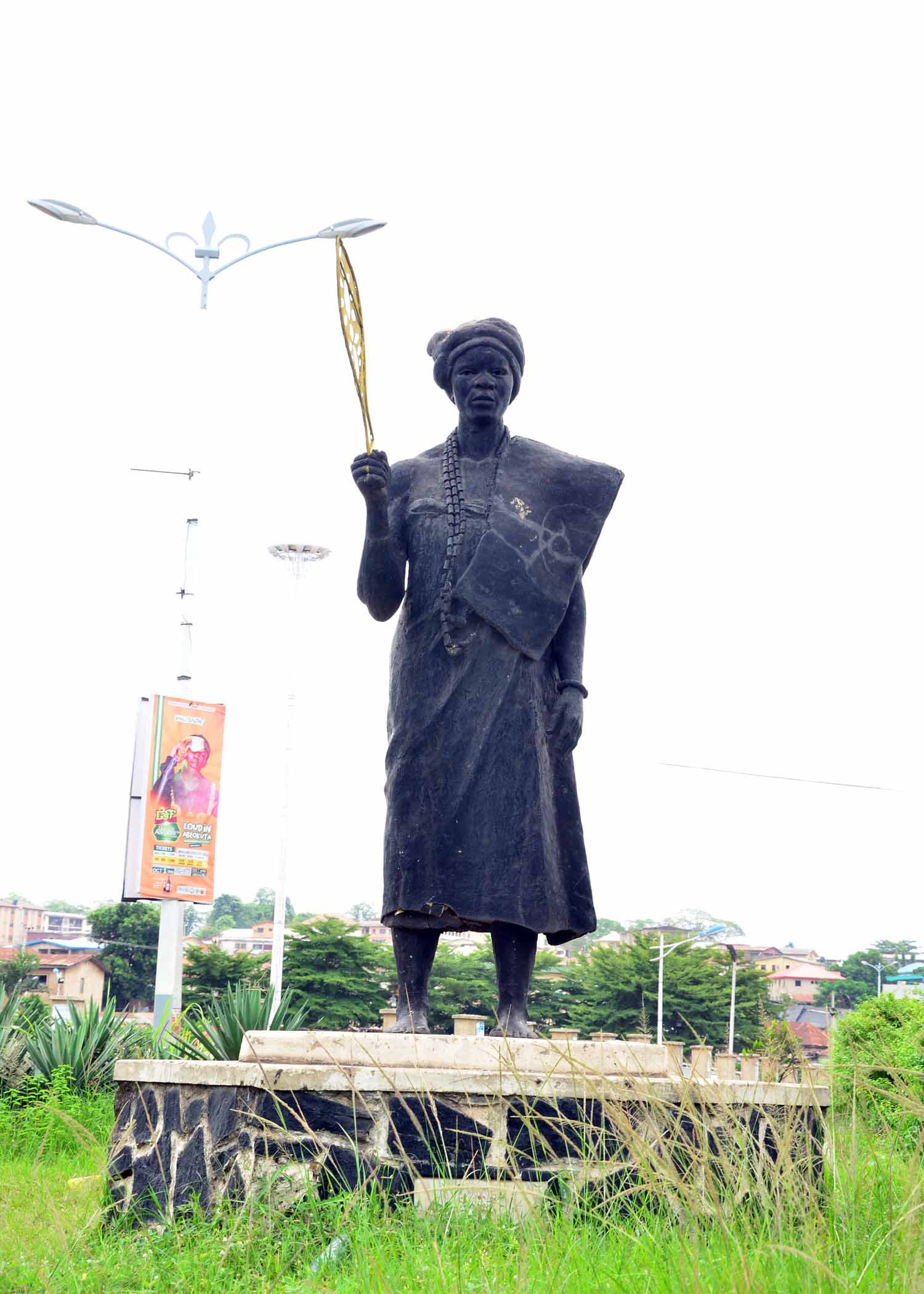
Statue of Tinubu in Abeokuta, Nigeria in 2019

Tinubu died in 1887 and is buried in Ojokodo Quarters in Abeokuta. Tinubu Square on Lagos Island, a place previously known as Independence Square, is named after her. Ita Tinubu (Tinubu's precinct or Tinubu Square) had long been known by that name before the country's independence, but it was renamed Independence Square by the leaders of the First Republic. A statue of Tinubu stands in Abeokuta.

== See also ==
- Efunsetan Aniwura
- Seriki Williams Abass
- Nigerian chieftaincy
- Gogo Habiba
- Ana Joaquina dos Santos e Silva
- Women's rights movement in Lagos

== Notes ==
- Gloria Chuku, "Tinubu, Efunroye," Dictionary of African Biography, Henry Louis Gates Jr. and Emmanuel K. Akyeampong, eds. (New York: Oxford University Press, 2008)
- "Tinubu, Madame (1805-1887)," New Encyclopedia of Africa, John Middleton and Joseph C. Miller, eds., 2nd ed. Vol. 5 (Detroit: Charles Scribner's Sons, 2008)
- Adams, Lawal Babatunde (2002). The history, people and culture of Ita-Tinubu community. Lagos: Tinubu Foundation.
- Fasinro, Hassan Adisa Babatunde (2004). Political and cultural perspectives of Lagos. University of Michigan.
- Johnson-Odim, Cheryl (1978). "3". Nigerian women and British colonialism : the Yoruba example with selected biographies (PhD). Northwestern University.
- Yemitan, Ọladipọ (1987). Madame Tinubu: Merchant and King-maker. Ibadan: University Press.
