= African apologies for the Atlantic slave trade =

The Atlantic slave trade involved the forced migration of millions of Africans to the New World, often with the complicity of African leaders and societies. Europeans collaborated with African leaders and merchants to capture and transport millions of Africans to slave plantations in the Americas. Various African societies benefited economically and politically from this trade, which involved the exchange of human lives for European goods such as firearms, textiles, and alcohol. In recent years, some African nations and individuals offered formal apologies or expressions of regret for their ancestors' roles in facilitating the trade.

== Expressions of apology ==
=== Benin ===
In 2000, Beninese president Mathieu Kérékou publicly apologised for the Benin's historical involvement in the Atlantic slave trade when the country's territory was known as the Kingdom of Dahomey. Beninese officials traveled to Virginia and Washington, D.C. in the United States to publicise his apology. Beninese politician Luc Gnacadja stated "We cry for forgiveness and reconciliation", adding "The slave trade is a shame, and we do repent for it".

=== Cameroon ===
In 2013, William Holland, an African-American businessman and descendant of enslaved individuals from Virginia, utilized genealogical research to trace his ancestry to the Oku clan of Cameroon. Holland subsequently traveled to the town of Bakou in Cameroon, where the local tribal chief, Ngako Ngalatchui, issued a formal apology for the Oku clan's historic selling of captives into the slave trade.

=== Ghana ===
In 2006, Ghana introduced Project Joseph, an initiative designed to promote tourism and investment in Ghana from descendants of the Atlantic slave trade. The initiative was intended to serve as an apology for Ghana's historical role in the slave trade, and it was named after the biblical figure Joseph, who was sold into slavery by his family.

During a visit to London, England in 2007, Ghanaian president John Kufuor rejected the notion that European nations bear full responsibly for the slave trade, stating that "some local indigenous groups were also guilty". He claimed "whatever way you look at it, slavery and slave trade were certainly an iniquity and a disgraceful business even if considered in relation to the other brutalities of the time".

In 2022, Nana Obokese Ampah I, the traditional king of Asebu, publicly issued an apology, stating, "It is time to address what must be said to the African Diaspora. We must engage in a meaningful conversation to acknowledge and reconcile our actions and inactions as rulers of our kingdoms during the Trans-Atlantic Slave Trade, which we deeply regret."

=== Libya ===
In 2010, Muammar Ghaddafi at the Arab-African summit an initiative as part of the Arab League, apologized on behalf of all Arabs for their role in slavery, including the Trans-Saharan and Indian Ocean slave trade:

I regret the behaviour of the Arabs [...] They brought African children to North Africa. They made them slaves. They sold them like animals. They took them as slaves and traded them in a shameful way [...] I regret and I am ashamed when we remember these practices. I apologise for this.

=== Nigeria ===
In 2009, the Civil Rights Congress of Nigeria, led by Nigerian politician Shehu Sani, called for chiefs in Nigeria to apologise for their ancestors' involvement in the slave trade. The Aro Council of Elders declined to apologise, stating they were "not apologetic about what happened in the past".

In 2018, Abdulrasheed Adewale Akanbi, a traditional monarch who holds the title of Oluwo of Iwo, issued an apology for the role that the traditional royal families in Nigeria played in the Atlantic slave trade.

The descendants of Seriki Abass, a prominent slave trader in the Nigerian town of Badagry, issued an apology for his historic selling of slaves.

=== Uganda ===
In 1998, Ugandan president Yoweri Museveni remarked in an interview that he would not seek an apology from U.S. president Bill Clinton during Clinton's visit to Africa. Museveni stated, "African chiefs were the ones waging war on each other and capturing their own people and selling them. If anyone should apologize it should be the African chiefs. We still have those traitors here even today."

In 2023, Musevini issued a formal apology for the Atlantic slave trade.
