= Ola Oluwa =

- LGA
- Interactive map of Ola Oluwa
- Location within Nigeria
- Coordinates: 7°47′N 4°13′E
- Country: Nigeria
- State: Osun State
- Headquarter: Bode Osi

Government
  - Local Government Chairman: Olaleye Babatunde Ayofe

Area
  - Total: 328 km^{2} (127 sq mi)

Population (2006 Census)
  - Total: 76,593
  - Density: 234/km^{2} (605/sq mi)
- Time zone: UTC+1 (WAT)
- 3-digit postal code prefix: 232
- ISO 3166 code: NG.OS.OL

Ola Oluwa is a Local Government Area in Osun State, Nigeria. Its headquarters are in the town of Bode Osi. It was formally called Iwo North Local Government on establishment, which was formally changed after the death of ọba abímbólá, the then Oluwo of Iwo. The current chairman of the council is Olaleye Babatunde Ayofe. It's now as another Local Government making two which is Ola Oluwa South East LCD A, Ilemowu.

It has an area of 328 km^{2} and a population of 76,593 according to the 2006 census.

== Ola-Oluwa South East Local Council Development Area (LCDA) ==
Ola-Oluwa South East Local Council Development Area was created out of Ola-Oluwa area council for administrative convenience, better development planning and to bring government closer to the grassroot. The LCDA is created by the Government of Osun State and is responsible for the funding of the council. The LCDA is headed by a chairman, vice chairman and other executive and legislative branches similar to the federally recognized local councils. The current chairman of the LCDA is Adebiyi Adedayo.

== Tertiary Education ==
The Local Government has two functioning private institution and one under construction, which are

1. Westland university, in iwara
1. Wolex polytechnic, iwara;
2. Mercy Medical University, Ìkirè ilé
3. Iwo College of Health Science and Technology, Amere.

== Postcode ==
The postal code of the area is 232.
