= Women's rights movement in Lagos =

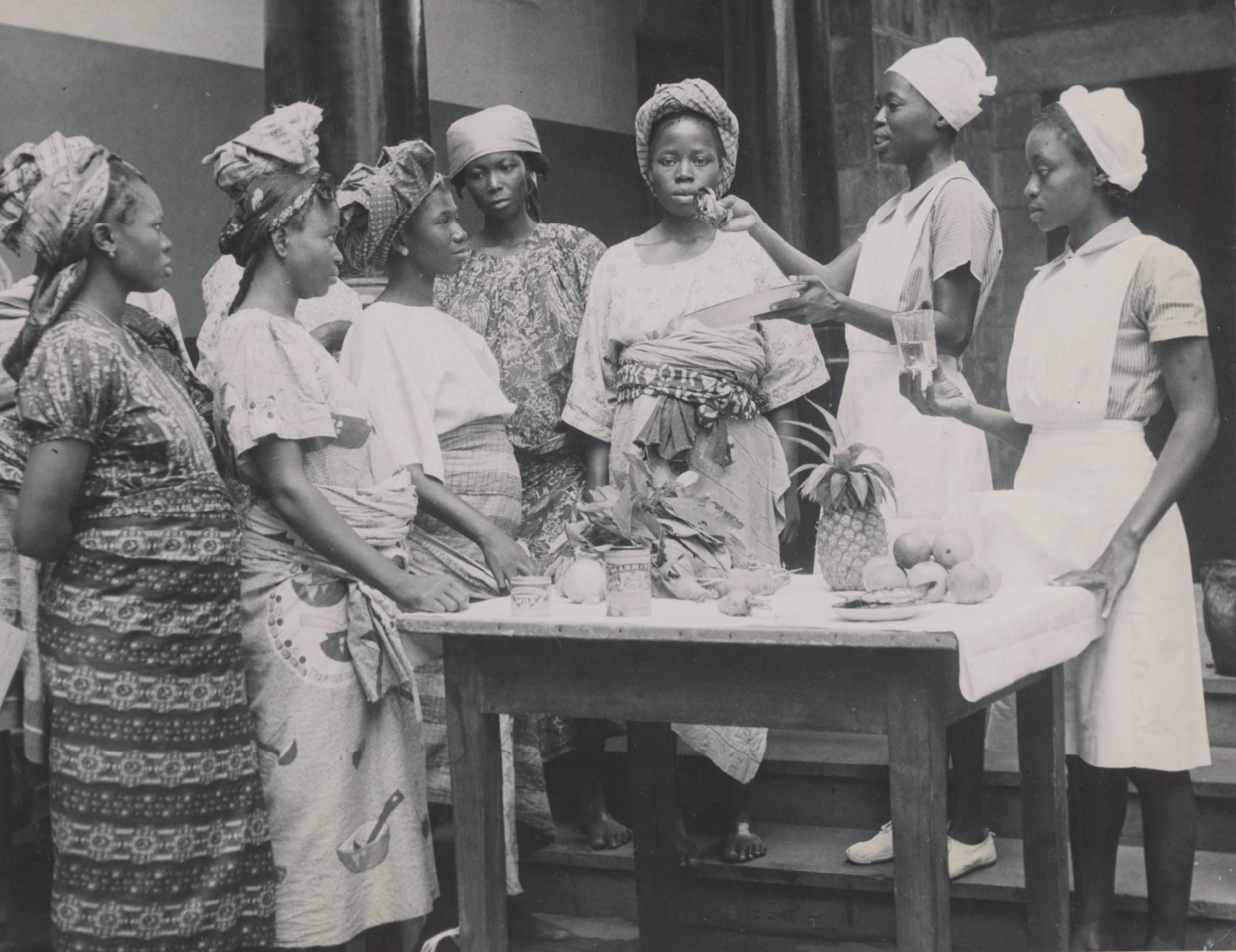
Midwife demonstrates proper diet to group of women at the Massey street Maternity Hospital, Lagos, Nigeria

The Women's rights movement in Lagos has always leveraged the need to promote and protect women's rights. The women's rights movement in Lagos has been documented through the activism of Madam Alimotu Pelewura, Lagos Market Women; Oyinkan Morenike Abayaomi, Nigerian Women Party; Madam Tinubu; and Charlotte Olajumoke Obasa, Lagos Women's League.

== Overview ==
Scholars argue that colonial rules was unfavorable to women. Yoruba women were excluded from the colonial administration and many Yoruba associations, including churches and mosques. Some Yoruba parents refused to send their daughters to school because British patriarchal values reinforced existing Yoruba cultural beliefs. According to Aderinto, the Lagos Market Women's Association emerged as an early women's interest group. The Nigerian Women's Party group was also established as an advocacy group to promote girls' education, adult women's literacy, equal pay and employment opportunities.

Lagos State was established on 27 May 1967. Since its creation, women have not fully participated in governance as members of the ruling class, and their representation has often been limited to token appointments. During the 2026 International Women's Day celebration, Governor Babajide Sanwo-Olu re-affirmed his commitment to promoting women's rights in Lagos State.

=== Women in Lagos State Executive Council from 1967 - 2015 ===
(Source: Akosa, 2015)
Year	Male (No of Seat)	%	Female (No of Seat)	%
1967 - 1968	4	100	0	0
1968 - 1970	12	100	0	0
1971 - 1973	13	100	0	0
1973 - 1975	17	94.1	1	5.88
1975 - 1977	20	95	1	5
1977 - 1978	18	94.4	1	5.6
1978 - 1979	22	95.5	1	4.5
1979 - Oct 1983	20	100	0	0
Oct 1983 - Dec 1983	17	100	0	0
1984 - 1986	19	94.7	1	5.3
1986 - 1988	19	89.5	2	10.5
1988 - 1991	19	79	4	21
1992 - 1993	11	81.8	2	18.1
1993 - 1996	14	82.9	1	7.1
1996 - 1999	15	80	3	20
1999 - 2003	29	89.7	3	10
2003 - 2007	48	97.9	1	2.1
2007 - 2011	38	97	3	3
2011 - 2015	34	89	4	11

Through Women's Voice and Leadership Nigeria Project, initiatives across 18 local governments and 46 communities in Lagos, address gender-based violence, empowers women, and promote the inclusion of older women. In 2024, a coalition of women's rights organizations in Lagos protested gender-based violence, calling for national attention to femicide and domestic violence. This coalition also promotes series of women's rights initiatives aimed at benefiting women and girls.
