= Iwo, Osun State =

City in Osun state

Iwo Ìwó Odíderé
- LGA and city
- Cassava plantation farm
- Nickname: Iwo Olodo Oba
- Motto(s): Iwo Olodo Oba, Iwo Ateni Gbola Ateni Gbore.
- Interactive map of Iwo
- Location within Nigeria
- Coordinates: 7°38′N 4°11′E
- Country: Nigeria
- State: Osun State
- Established: 14th Century (Circa)
- Founder: Prince Adekola Telu

Government
  - Chairman: Isola Kamoli Adeniyi

Area
  - Total: 7,543 km^{2} (2,912 sq mi)

Population (2006 Census)
  - Total: 191,377
  - Density: 25.37/km^{2} (65.71/sq mi)
- (central city/Local Government)
- Time zone: UTC+1 (WAT)
- 3-digit postal code prefix: 232
- ISO 3166 code: NG.OS.IO
- Climate: Aw
- National language: Yorùbá

Iwo is a city in Osun State, Nigeria. The Iwo people, like all other people of the Yoruba kingdom, are believed to have originated from Ile-Ife, where they migrated sometime in the 11th century according to Alademomi Kenyon and Prince Adelegan Adegbola (2009). The only predicted land with the symbol of the parrots (which signifies the location of the promised land) is the Iwo kingdom. The city was formerly part of old Oyo state and was later separated and became one of the major townships in Osun State, Nigeria. Isola Kamoli Adeniyi is the current chairman of the council.

It has over 30 ancient and powerful Kings all under the Oluwo of Iwoland, HRM Oba Abdulrasheed Adewale Akanbi as the only Consenting Authority and paramount ruler. In Osun State alone, he ranks firmly behind The Ooni of Ife, The Owa Obokun of Ijesaland, The Orangun of Ila. In an area of 245 km^{2} and a population of 191,348 (central city/Local Government). The other local governments in Iwo from satellite towns are Aiyedire Local Government, 265.783 km^{2} area and 76,309 by population, as well as Ola-Oluwa Local Government, 332.117 km^{2} area and 76,227 by population. The headquarters of the local governments are Iwo (Central), Iwo; Aiyedire, Ile Ogbo; and Ola-Oluwa, Bode-Osi. Iwo now has additional four local governments: Iwo East, Olomowewe; Iwo West, Agberire; Ọla Oluwa South East, Ilemowu; Ayedire South East, Oluponna.

== Iwo East and Iwo West LCDAs ==
Iwo East and Iwo West Local Council Development Areas (LCDAs) were created out of Iwo for administrative convenience, better development planning and to bring government closer to the grassroot. The LCDA is created by the Government of Osun State and is responsible for the funding of the council. The LCDA is headed by a chairman, vice chairman and other executive and legislative branches similar to the federally recognized local councils. The current chairman of Iwo East LCDA is Lawal Lukman Adeyinka and the chairman of Iwo West LCDA is Ajani Tajudeen Babatunde.

== Education ==
The source of orthodox education in Iwo was, initially, primarily Christian missionary based. These were mostly Baptist, as each Baptist Church branch in the central city established a primary school of its own with corresponding name after the branch: Aipate Baptist Day School, Olukotun Baptist Day School, Feesu Baptist Day School, Oke-Odo Baptist Day School. The Baptists also established a secondary school, Baptist High school, Iwo, the only institution in Iwo awarding Advanced Level of West African School Certificate in addition to the Ordinary Level certificate. There was also a Baptist Modern school (now obsolete in Nigeria educational system) which now metamorphosed to Baptist Grammar school – awarding ordinary level certificates like other secondary schools. These in addition to the old Baptist College, a Teacher Training College, and one of the oldest of such in Africa and main source of teachers to the Nigerian and other African countries Education system. The college is now the site of Bowen University, the secular Baptist University and is one of the three universities in Iwo and its environment. The Baptists were followed by the Methodist who had a Methodist Primary School in the central city, as well as a Modern school, now United Methodist High School.

The Catholics had a Modern School, now Catholic Grammar School, and a Female Secondary School – St. Mary's High School which is now a co-educational school.

The government later joined the Christian missionaries in establishing many primary schools, a Modern School, Local authority Modern School, now Local Authority Commercial Grammar School, a Teacher Training College, LATCO, later changed in 1964 to Iwo Grammar School.

Muslim missionaries also joined the efforts later in establishing Ansar-U-deen Primary School, Ansar-U-deen Modern School which is now Ansar-U-deen Grammar School, and Anwar-ul-Islam Grammar School. The first Shariah court in Nigeria was established in Iwo. Iwo people are majorly Muslim as early as 1655 when the first mosque in Yorubaland was built which serves as the first place of worship and Islamic education. Among the major secondary schools are the Iwo Grammar School, the United Methodist High School, the Baptist High School, St. Mary's High School, the L.A. Commercial Grammar School, Islahudeen Grammar School and the Anwar-ul-Islam Grammar School.

Arabic Schools in Iwo

Arabic Schools/Modrassah in Iwo include Islahudeen Arabic School, Obatedo, founded by late Sheikh Abdulbaaqi Muhammad, Amin Training Center, Araromi established by late Sheikh Badrudeen Al-Amin, Markaz Shabaab–l–Islam or Islamic Youth Center, established by Sheikh Ahmad Muhally Adedimeji Aroworeki, Islamic Cultural Center (Markaz Abdul Razaq Abdul Rahman), ilory Villa, Agbowo, Iwo and others..

There are many primary schools in the satellite towns established by the former Western Regional Government as well as many secondary schools in Iwo and its satellite towns which were established during the tenure of Chief Bola Ige as the governor of the old Oyo state.

List of Higher Institution in Iwo are: BOWEN University, Wolex Polytechnic, Baptist Teachers' Training College which was located at Oke Odo in Iwo, but this facility is now used as the campus of Bowen University, Westland University, Iwo city polytechnic, Royal College of Public Health and Technology, Empire College of Health Technology, Al Ummah College of Education, Federal College of Education, Offer center institute of Agriculture. Another institution in Iwo is Shariah College of Nigeria, which used to be in Ibadan before it was relocated to its permanent site at Oke-Afo, Iwo.

Among the major private secondary schools are Islamic Model College, Muslim International School, Agbaje Memorial Comprehensive College, Aipate Baptist School, Vico-Hope Comprehensive College, A-1 Grammar School, Crowey Schools, Regina Mundi Girls Secondary School, The wings school, Innayatullah muslim academy, ICC Model school, Our Lady of Fatima academy (OLFA).

== Technology ==
Iwo is the home for the first state television in Nigeria which is founded 1982, Reality Television Service (RTS), It is also the home of Reality Radiovision Services (RRS), also known as odidere fm or 96.3Fm. An old radio station at ori eru Iwo Am which was abandoned by the Osun State government.

== Radio And Television Stations ==
1. Akorede Radio 98.9
2. Ayeekooto FM. 88.3
3. Bowen Radio. 101.9
4. Reality Radio. 96.3
5. Reality Television Service 66UHF
6. Empire Radio
7. Al Qudus Islamic Internet Radio

== Agriculture ==
Short story of Iwo in Oyo dialect by a native speaker

Iwo is a home to Osun State Agricultural Development Programmes (OSSADEP), also selema farms, shabeeb agro and many more.

== Community based organisations ==
Among the leading community based organisations in Iwo are: Iwo Board of Trustees (IBOT), Iwo Action Council (IWAC), Iwo Progressive Union (IPU), Iwoland Development Coalition (IDC), Guildance Community Development Foundation, Charitable Youth for Nation Building Initiative, Iwo Odidere Leo Club. Iwo Action Council (IWAC) is the umbrella body of all organisations in Iwo. IWAC has been known for being in the forefront as developmental focus organisation.

Iwoland Development Coalition (IDC) was formed on 29 August 2014 to champion development of Iwo, Aiyedire and Ola Oluwa Local Government. IDC currently have members in countries like: Kuwait, Saudi Arabia, Qatar, Côte d'Ivoire, France, United States of America, United Kingdom. IDC though is still a new organisation but has succeeded in establishing a health clinic at Akinbami in Aiyedire Local Government, reconstructed culvert at Ojude Oba in Iwo, staged schools tour in Iwo, Aiyedire and Ola Oluwa Local Governments, award scholarship to students in need, rehabilitate Yidi Oba culvert, organised lectures on burning issues, distributed over 8,000 health books (containing useful information on how to take care of pregnant and children), organised widows empowerment programme, provide nutritional support to orphans and vulnerable children, take care of people with disabilities, researched the history of Iwoland, administered Vitamin A and Abendazole for the benefit of children of ages 0 and 5 years, patched pot holes from Adeeke and Kajola road, cleaned and painted Iwo roundabout, organised health outreach, assisted Local Authority Grammar School to transport chairs from Iwo Grammar School and payment of WAEC examination of 6 students two each from Iwo, Aiyedire and Ola Oluwa Local Government.

== Iwo Chamber of Commerce and Industry Limited/GTE ==
People interested in economic development of Iwoland came together in 2018 and formed Iwo Chamber of Commerce and Industry Limited/GTE. The organization was registered with Corporate Affairs Commission in 2021 which is completely different from the defunct one established in 1989. The Iwo Chamber of Commerce and Industry was established for the promotion and protection of trade and industry and to represent and express the opinion of the business community on matters affecting trade and industry in Iwoland which consists of the three local government areas in the federal constituency (Iwo, Ayedire and Ola Oluwa) Iwoland Federal constituency and where applicable, the whole State of Osun and the Federation. It is a non-profit-sharing organization and its income and properties are applied solely for the promotion of ICCI's objectives.

Among those people that made it happen then are: Olusegun Dada (Esq), Kudaisi Ismaila (Esq), Olawale Rasheed, Senator Adelere Oriolowo, Alhaji Mokanju Musibau FCA, Professor Waheed Hassan, Otunba Jire Ayinla, Akogun Olaposi Adiatu, Adebayo Lasisi PhD, FCA, Kabiru Adisa FCA, Lanre Omotayo PhD, Princess Funmi Lamuye.

== Climate ==
Iwo has a tropical wet and dry or savanna climate and is zero metres/feet above sea level (Aw classification). The area averages a yearly temperature of 29.66 °C (85.39 °F), which is 0.2% higher than the national average for Nigeria. Iwo generally experiences 248.57 wet days (68.1% of the time) annually with average precipitation of 133.63 millimetres (5.261 in).

== List of Iwo Local Government Chairmen from 1989 until present ==
1. Chief Blarinwa 1989–1989
2. Chief Ganiyu Iromini 1993–1994
3. Barrister Gbadegeshin Adedeji 1994–1996
4. Mr Kamilu Adio 1996–1997
5. Honourable Mutiu Kareem 1999–2002
6. Honourable Moshood Adeoti 2002–2003
7. Honourable Rasaki Ajadi Salwu 2003–2006
8. Engineer Lasun Olaniyi 2006–2007
9. Honourable Sulaimon Bello 2007–2010
10. Honourable Kamo Olabisi Alao 2010–2016
11. Honourable Kamorudeen Raji 2017–2021
12. Honourable Ishola Kamar Adeniyi since 2021
