= Black separatism =

Movement for separate institutions

Black separatism is a race-based separatist political movement that seeks separate economic and cultural development for people of sub-Saharan African descent in societies, particularly in the United States. Black separatism stems from the idea of racial solidarity, and it also implies that black people should organize themselves on the basis of their common skin color, their race, culture, and African heritage. There were a total of 255 black separatist groups recorded in the United States as of 2019.

Black separatism in its purest form asserts that black people and white people ideally should form two independent nations. Additionally, black separatists often seek to return to their original cultural homeland of Africa. This sentiment was spearheaded by Marcus Garvey and the Universal Negro Improvement Association in the 1920s. Black separatists generally think that black people are hindered in a white-dominated society.

== Concepts ==
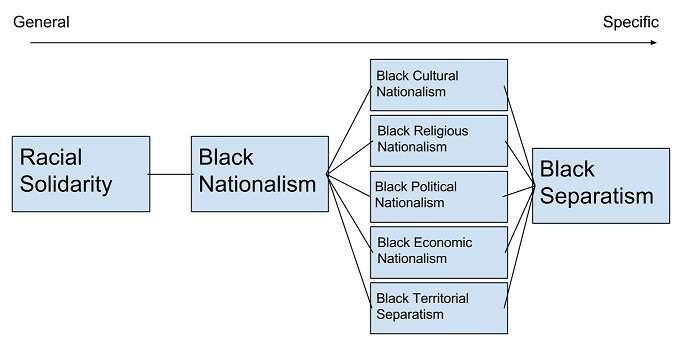
Conceptual breakdown of black separatism

In his discussion of black nationalism in the late nineteenth and early twentieth centuries, the historian Wilson Jeremiah Moses observes that "black separatism, or self-containment, which in its extreme form advocated the perpetual physical separation of the races, usually referred only to a simple institutional separatism, or the desire to see black people making independent efforts to sustain themselves in a proven hostile environment."

Scholars Talmadge Anderson and James Stewart further make a distinction between the "classical version of Black separatism advocated by Booker T. Washington" and "modern separatist ideology." They observe that "Washington's accommodationist advice" at the end of the nineteenth century "was for Blacks not to agitate for social, intellectual, and professional equality with Whites". By contrast, they observe, "contemporary separatists exhort Blacks not only to equal Whites but to surpass them as a tribute to and redemption of their African heritage." Anderson and Stewart add, moreover, that in general "modern black separatism is difficult to define because of its similarity to black nationalism."

Indeed, black separatism's specific goals were historically in flux and they also varied from group to group. Martin Delany in the 19th century and Marcus Garvey in the 1920s outspokenly called for African Americans to return to Africa, by moving to Liberia. Benjamin "Pap" Singleton looked to form separatist colonies in the American West. The Nation of Islam calls for several independent black states on American soil. More mainstream views within black separatism hold that black people would be better served by schools and businesses that are exclusively for black people, as well as by local black politicians and police.

=== Similarity to black nationalism ===
There are similarities between black nationalism and black separatism, mainly that they both advocate for the civil rights of black people. There are a few differences between them, however. Black separatists believe that black people should be physically separated from other races, primarily whites; black separatists would for example want a separate nation for black people. Examples of black separatist organizations include the Nation of Islam and the New Black Panther Party.

This is slightly different from black nationalists because black nationalists do not always believe in a physical separation of black people. In some form, black nationalists do believe in separation, but not physical separation. Black nationalists focus more on Black pride, justice, and identity. Their belief is that black people should be proud of their own skin, heritage, and beauty. They also believe that there should be justice for black people, especially in the United States.

== Usage by the Southern Poverty Law Center ==
The term "Black separatism" has been used by the Southern Poverty Law Center (SPLC), an American civil rights advocacy group, to categorize several groups in the United States promoting antisemitic, anti-LGBTQ and male supremacist views. However, in October 2020, the SPLC announced that they would no longer use the category of "Black separatism", saying this was done to avoid creating a false equivalence between Black separatism and White supremacist extremism.

== See also ==
- Black-owned businesses
- Afrocentric education
- Black genocide
- Black supremacy
- Cultural nationalism
- Economic nationalism
- Religious nationalism
- Back-to-Africa movement
- Blaxit
- White separatism
