= Ana Joaquina dos Santos e Silva =

Afro-Portuguese merchant and slave-trader

- Born: c.1800 Luanda, Portuguese Angola
- Died: 1859 (aged 58–59); Atlantic Ocean
- Known for: Merchant, slave-trader, socialite

Ana Joaquina dos Santos e Silva (c. 1800-1859), also known as Ná Andêmbo, was an Afro-Portuguese creole merchant and slave-trader active in Portuguese Angola.

== Early life ==
Ana Joaquina was born in the urban settlement of Luanda in Portuguese Angola in the early 19th century. She had a Portuguese father and a Mestiço mother, making her part of the significant community of mixed-race Afro-Portuguese creoles living in the Portuguese colony at the time. Little is known about her early life. She married two Portuguese merchants in succession and inherited their businesses at their deaths, accumulating an extensive portfolio of slave trading businesses in the 1820s.

== Business activities ==
Joaquina was a powerful figure in the slave trade in Angola and she built strong connections with slave buyers in Brazil which possessed a major plantation slavery economy. Aguardente liquour, sugar, and wheat flour were imported into Angola in exchange. Alongside her slave export business, Joaquina also established a number of slave plantations in her own right within Angola. This included sugar plantations at Ícolo e Bengo and Golungo Alto and also "several farms" at Moçâmedes, established through the 1830s and 1840s.

As part of her slave trading business, Joaquina owned a small fleet of ships which carried slaves and goods between Angola and the Brazilian ports of Baía, Recife, Pernambuco, and Rio de Janeiro. Her fleet also traded goods with Lisbon in metropolitan Portugal and Montevideo, Uruguay. Although the transatlantic slave trade was prohibited in the Portuguese colonial empire in 1836, it remained legal de facto in Angola and Brazil for several further decades. It was widely believed that Joaquina's ships continued to export slaves illicitly through Luanda after this point.

Joaquina was a prominent figure in high society in Luanda where she owned a three-storey mansion in the Bungo district and was among the wealthiest inhabitants. She remained on excellent terms with the Portuguese colonial governors which was vital to ensure the survival of her slave trading activities.

Alongside her other business interests, Joaquina was an active money-lender lending to Portuguese and African traders active in Angola. As part of this business, she funded the expedition by the trader Joaquim Rodrigues Graça who was sent by the Portuguese government to establish political relations with the Lunda Empire in 1843.

== Death ==
After falling ill, Joaquina left Luanda on 6 April 1859 to travel to Lisbon in Portugal to seek medical treatment. She died during the crossing and never arrived; her body was probably buried at sea. Her former residence in Luanda, known as the Palácio Dona Ana Joaquina, was demolished in 1999. A "more or less faithful" replica of the building was later rebuilt on the site. Joaquina disinherited her daughter, Tereza Luíza, possibly for entering into a marriage with the brother of a competing merchant without her consent. She instead left her fortune to her grandchildren.

== See also ==
- Efunroye Tinubu (1810–1887) - West African female merchant and slave trader.
