= Tinubu Square =

Landmark in Lagos, Nigeria

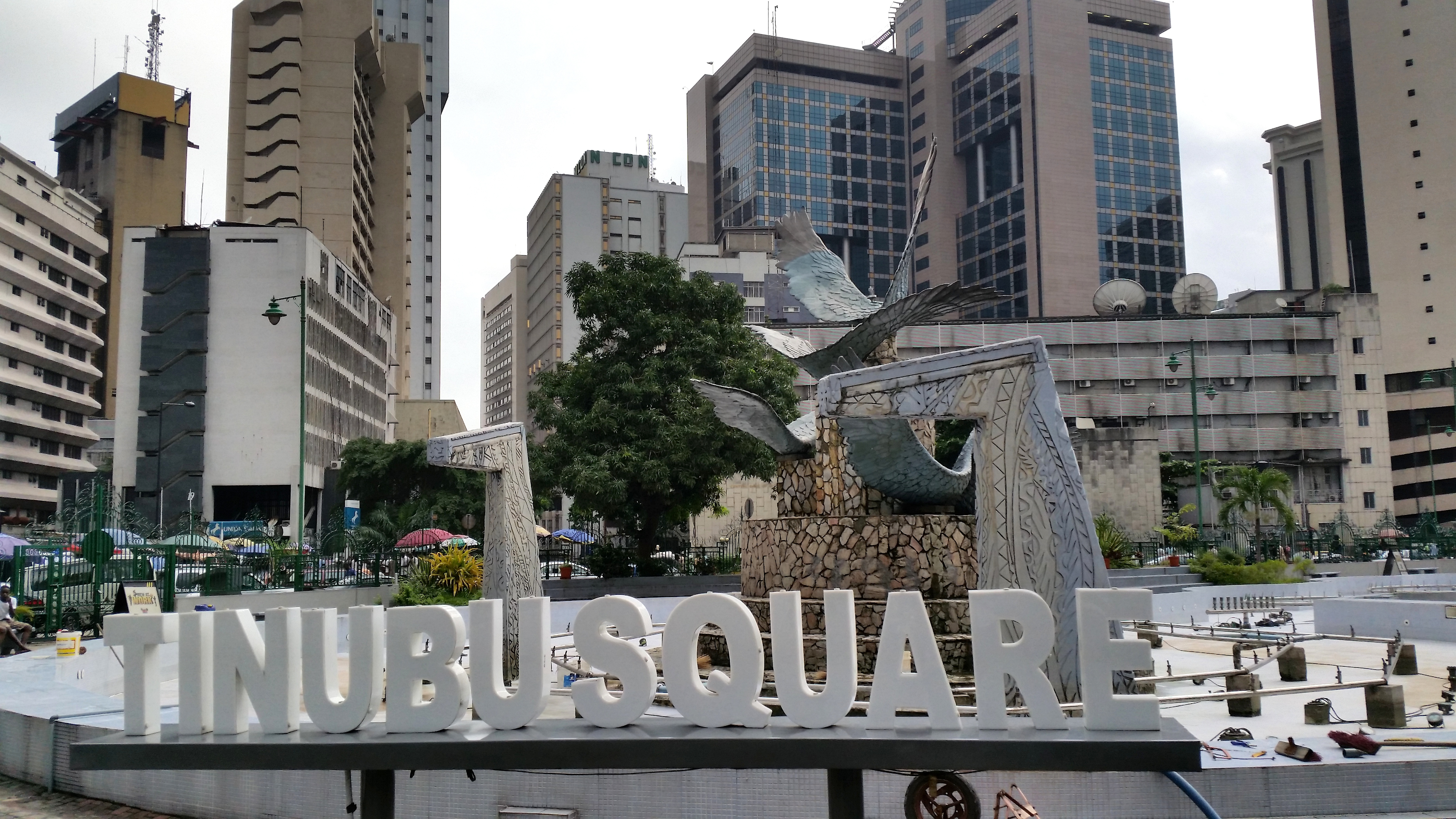
- Tinubu Square in 2014
- Interactive map of Tinubu Square
- Type: Public square
- Location: Lagos Island, Lagos, Nigeria
- Coordinates: 6°27′14″N 3°23′22″E
- Created: 1960
- Operator: Lagos State Government
- Status: Open year-round

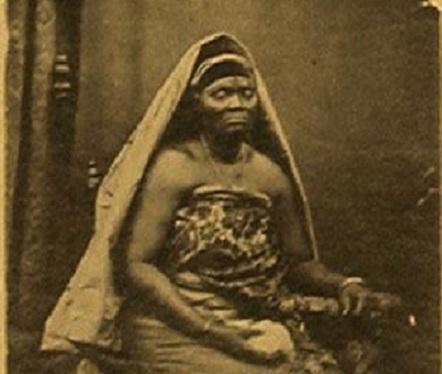
Madam Tinubu before 1887

Tinubu Square, formerly Independence Square, is an open space landmark located in Broad Street, Lagos Island, Lagos State, Nigeria named after the Yoruba slave trader, merchant, and aristocrat Madam Efunroye Tinubu. It was formerly called Ita Tinubu before it was named Independence Square by leaders of the First Nigerian Republic after Nigerian independence and subsequently Tinubu Square.

== History ==
According to a historian, it was the location of the first court of justice which was replaced in 1918 by the Supreme Court or the Court of Assizes, which was a magnificent structure. The Square was the melting point of different cultures, a place where the indigenous Lagosians, those of Brazilian extract and the colonial administration met.

== Structure ==
The square is iron-fenced with two flowing fountains, flowers and tropical trees; and contains a life-size statue of Madam Tinubu on a cenotaph. The square is 2,000 square metres (2,400 yd^{2}; 22,000 ft^{2}) in area and was last remodeled in 2017 by the Lagos State Government.

== Environment ==
The Tinubu Square is a serene location, with efforts being made by the operation "Keep Lagos Clean" to make the square a place for tourism and centre of attraction.

== Art Installations ==
In 2021 and 2022, two art exhibition installations were realised at Tinubu Square in an international collaboration between various players from the arts and culture sector. The first exhibition presented film stills by Stephen Goldblatt, which were taken in 1970 in Nigeria during the film production Things Fall Apart and were found by chance in Berlin almost fifty years later. The second exhibition showed photographs taken by German photographer Nina Fischer-Stephan in various parts of Nigeria in the 1960s, which were presented to the public for the first time. During the second project, Lagos based contemporary artist Mallam Mudi Yahaya created the short documentary Nina Fischer-Stephan's Respectful Gaze.

== Gallery ==
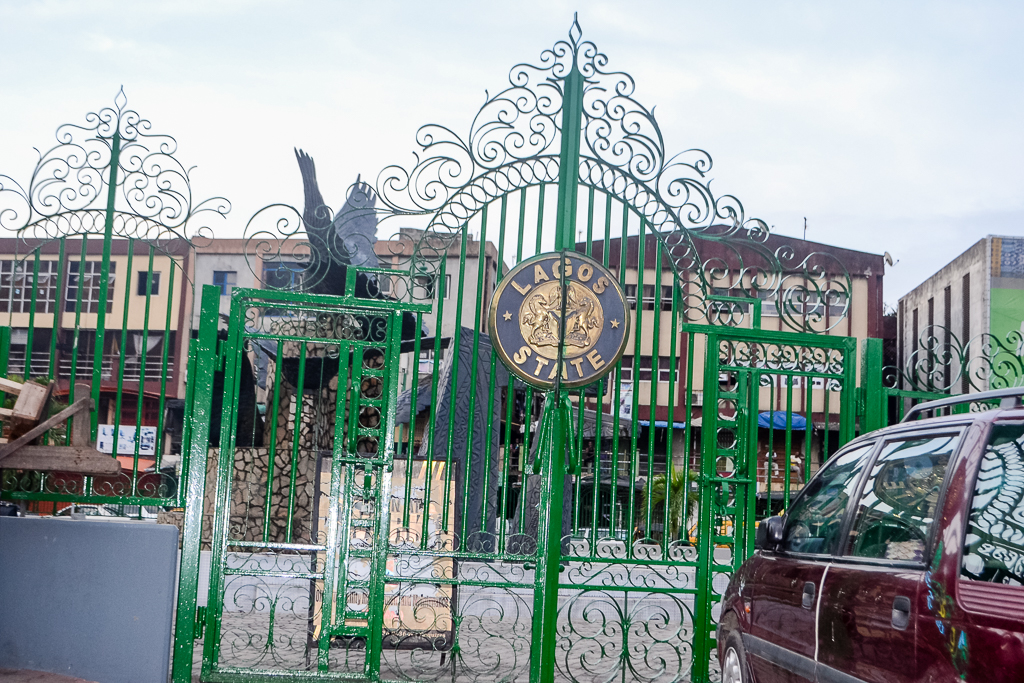
Entrance

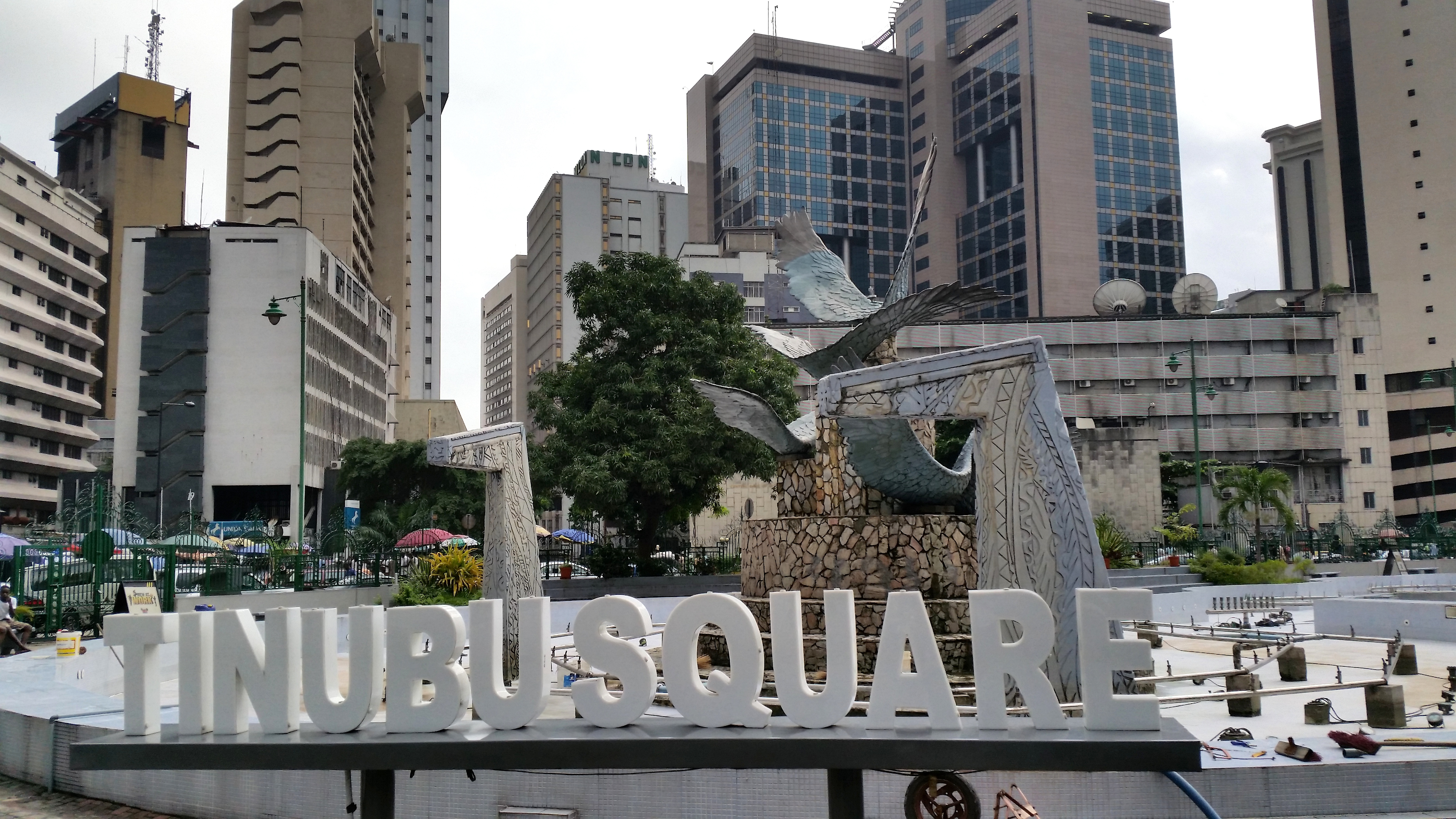

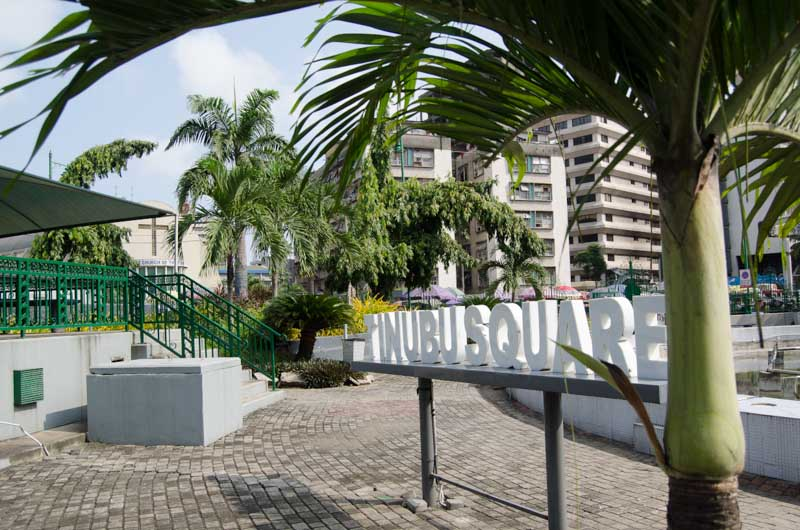

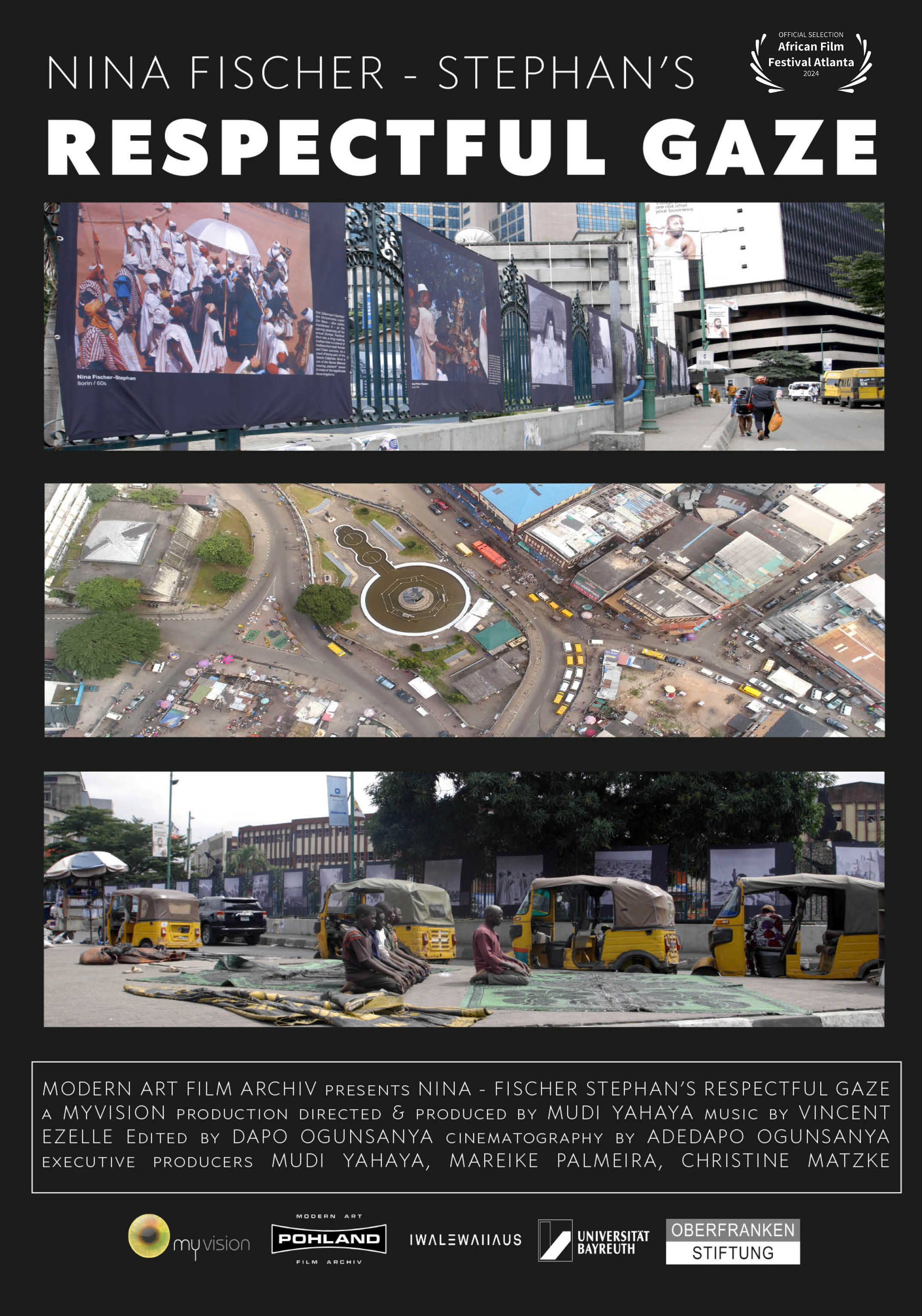

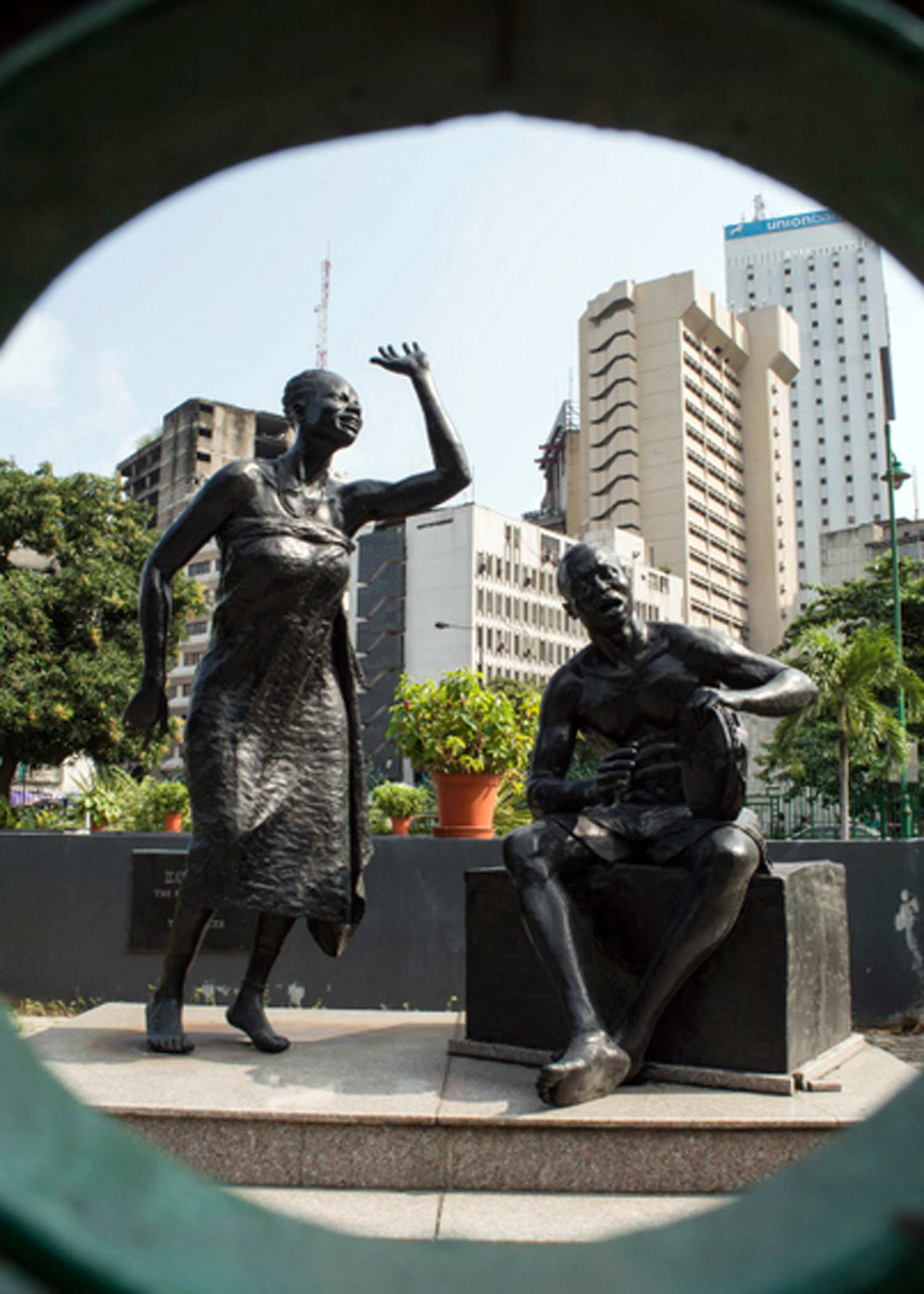

Tinubu Square in 1962 with a modernist fountain
