= Bode Osi =

Town in Osun State, Nigeria

- Location within Nigeria
- Coordinates: 7°45′02″N 4°13′45″E
- Country: Nigeria
- State: Osun State
- Time zone: UTC+1
- Postal Code: 232107

Bode Osi is a town in Osun State, Nigeria. It is located around 36 kilometres (22 mi) away from Osogbo, the capital of Osun State, and 370 kilometres (230 mi) from Abuja, the capital of Nigeria. Bode Osi is also the headquarters of Ola Oluwa Local Government Area.

== Climate ==
Bode Osi has a tropical savanna climate (Aw according to the Köppen climate classification), similar to most of Nigeria, with a wet season, a dry season and warm weather year–round. The dry season is muggy and partially cloudy, while the wet season can be oppressive and overcast. The average annual temperature fluctuates between 65 °F (18 °C) and 94 °F (34 °C), rarely falling below 60 °F (16 °C) or rising over 99 °F (37 °C).

=== Temperature ===
The hottest period of the year is from January to April, with an average daily high temperature exceeding 91 °F (33 °C). With an average high of 93 °F (34 °C) and a low of 73 °F (23 °C), March is the hottest month of the year in Bode Osi.

The coolest period of the year is from June to October, with an average daily maximum temperature below 85 °F (29 °C). With an average high of 82 °F (28 °C) and low of 70 °F (21 °C), August is the coolest month of the year.

=== Clouds and precipitation ===
The wet season usually lasts from April to October. September has an average of 24.8 days with at least 0.04 inches of precipitation, making it the month with the most rainy days. The rest of the year forms the dry season. With an average of 1.2 days with at least 0.04 inches of precipitation, January is the month with the fewest rainy days.

The average percentage of sky covered by clouds in Bode Osi varies significantly seasonally throughout the year, with the clearest part of the year being from November to February. December is the clearest month of the year, with the sky remaining clear, mostly clear, or partly overcast 52% of the time on average. The rest of the year is more cloudy, with April being the cloudiest, when the sky is cloudy or mostly cloudy 84% of the time on average.

== Governance ==
Oba Abioye Oyewole, an engineer and former elected council chairman, was the Olubode (traditional ruler) of Bode Osi in 2017.
