= Ileogbo =

Town in Osun State, Nigeria

Ileogbo is a town and the headquarters of Aiyedire Local Government in Osun State, Nigeria. It is situated midway between Ibadan and Osogbo, the capitals of Oyo and Osun State. Ibadan is about 50 km to the south of Ileogbo, Osogbo is about 40 km to its north, and Oyo 47 km to its west.

== History ==
The name Ileogbo comes from an old Yoruba folk tale that the people in this town had a very long life span, as Ileogbo means "the land of the old". The settlers in this town used to have a saying "Ile Ogbo mi ni mo de yi", meaning 'the place where I will live till I am very old', and the name was later shortened to Ileogbo.

Ileogbo, inarguably is a product of Ore Tree. The tree, because of its peculiarity, is a pointer to the seating of Ileogbo, the headquarters of Ayedire Local Government in Osun State. The tree life span is uncertain as the first settlers are younger than Ore tree.

== Culture ==
The egungun festival (masquerade) is practiced in Ileogbo.

== Education ==
The first school in Ileogbo, a primary school known as African Church School, was established in 1924. However, classes were not recorded until 1938, where it is known that a class of 30 students was taught under the school's first headmaster, Daniel Durojaye. Several new primary schools were established soon afterwards, with at least four more appearing from the period between 1939 and 1955. Efforts by the local Catholic mission to establish Saint Mary's Grammar School around this time failed in Ileogbo, with officials deciding to move the institution to Iwo instead. The town's first secondary school was established in 1975, and its first cohort of students numbered 120. Two more secondary schools were built in the 1980s, as was an Arabic high school.

== Climate ==
In Ile-Ogbo, the wet season is oppressive and humid, the dry season is muggy and partially cloudy, and it's hot all year round. The average annual temperature ranges between 66 °F and 94 °F, rarely falling below 60 °F or rising above 99 °F.

From January 22 to April 7 is the hot season, which lasts 2.5 months and has an average daily high temperature of more than 92 °F. Ile-Ogbo experiences its warmest weather in March, with an average high temperature of 93 °F and low temperature of 73 °F.

The 3.7-month cool season, which runs from June 15 to October 6, has an average daily maximum temperature of less than 85 °F. August is the coldest month of the year in Ile-Ogbo, with an average low temperature of 71 °F and high temperature of 83 °F.
