= Local council =

Local council may refer to:

== Political subdivision ==
- Local council (Israel)
- Local council (Jordan)
- Local councils of Malta
- An elected authority in the local government in the United Kingdom
- An elected authority in the local government in Australia
- Local Council (Uganda), a form of local elected government within the districts of Uganda
- Local municipality (South Africa)
- Parsissaet, former local councils in colonial Greenland

== Religious ==
- Local Council of the Russian Orthodox Church
- In the Eastern Orthodox Church, a local council is a historical synod (council of bishops)

== Other ==
- Boy Scouts of America Local Councils
- Local School Councils, a council in every public school in Chicago, USA

== See also ==
- Local government
- Municipal council
