= Abdulrasheed Adewale Akanbi =

Nigerian traditional ruler (born 1967)

- Oba

16th Oluwo of Iwo
- Reign: 16 January 2016
- Coronation: 16 January 2016
- Predecessor: Asiru Olatunbosun Tadese
- Born: 21 June 1967; Iwo, Osun
- Spouse: Chanel Chin (divorced); Princess Firdaus
- House: Gbaase
- Father: Kola Akanbi

Abdulrasheed Adewale Akanbi (born 21 June 1967) is a Nigerian traditional ruler. He is the 16th Oluwo of Iwo.

== Early life and education ==
Oba Abdulrasheed Adewale Akanbi was born on 21 June, 1967 to the family of Prince Kola Akanbi of Gbaase Ruling House, Iwo Kingdom. He attended elementary school at Omolewa Nursery and Primary School, Oritamefa, Ibadan, between 1972 and 1978. In 1978, Adewale Akanbi started his secondary education at Iwo Grammar School, Araromi, Iwo and later went to Oba Akinyele Memorial High School, Idi-Ape, Ibadan. He subsequently attended the Polytechnic Ibadan, where he obtained a National Diploma in Mass Communication in 1987.

== Career ==
Oba Abdulrasheed Adewale Akanbi is the Director and Founder of People Against Loneliness Inc., and the managing director of Morganz Gamo Quarry, Ibadan.

== Reign ==
Akanbi was crowned as the 16th Oluwo of Iwo in 2016.

In 2018, he issued an apology for the role that the traditional royal families in Nigeria played in the Atlantic slave trade.

In May 2024, he and Igwe Alfred Achebe, the Obi of Onitsha, bestowed the chieftaincy titles Ada Mazi (transl. 'the daughter of the Igbo ancestral palace') and Adetokunbo (transl. 'royalty from across the seas') on to Meghan, Duchess of Sussex during a royal visit.

== Personal life ==
Oba Abdulrasheed Adewale Akanbi is Muslim. He was first married to Chanel Chin, with whom he has a son, and they later divorced. He married a second time to Princess Firdaus, with whom he has a daughter.
