= Federal College of Education, Iwo =

Public institution in Nigeria

- Other names: FCE, IWO
- Motto: Integrity, Wisdom and optimism
- Type: Public
- Established: 2020
- Provost: Professor Rafiu Adebayo
- Location: Iwo, Osun State, Nigeria
- Campus: Urban
- Colours: Green
- Website: Official website

Federal College of Education, Iwo is a public institution in Osun State, Nigeria authorized with issuance of National Certificate in Education (NCE) to successful graduating students.

== Governing Council ==
- Liad Tella – Chairman
- Auwal Hassan – Member
- Hajia Amina Tagwai Aji – Member
- Sunday Agholor – Member
- A. A. Adewale – Rep. Fed. Ministry of Education
- L.B. Aremu Rep. NCCE
- R. I. Adebayo – Provost/Member
- M. A. Yusuff Registrar/Secretary

== Background ==
Federal College of Education, Iwo was established in 2020 at Iwo, Osun State, by the administration of President Muhammadu Buhari. The college is among the 30 newly established higher institution learning established by the Buhari's administration since assuming power In 2015. The pioneer Provost is Professor Rafiu Adebayo appointed in April 2021.

As part of the take off-plan, the federal government of Nigeria approved NGN 1.3 billion in the 2022 budget allocation to the collegehttps://fceiwo.edu.ng/tag/education/. In June 2021, the Paramount Ruler of Iwoland, Oba Abdulrosheed Adewale Akanbi presented the Certificate of Occupancy (C of O), to the management team on the permanent site of the institution.
