= Oluwo of Iwo =

Traditional ruler of Iwo

The Oluwo of Iwo is the traditional ruler of Iwo, a prominent city located in Osun State, Nigeria.

== List of Rulers ==
- Oba Adekola Telu
- Oba Adeyemi
- Oba Oganfenumodi
- Oba Ogunlaoye
- Oba Arole Olumade Parin
- Oba Olayilumi I
- Oba Oluogba
- Oba Eboade Olayilumi II
- Oba Adegunodo
- Oba Olufate Gbase
- Oba Alawusa
- Oba Ogunmakinde Ande 1641- 1766
- Oba Muhammadu Ayinla Lamuye 1766-1906
- Oba Sunmonu Osunwo 1906-1909
- Oba Sanni Abimbola I 1909-1929
- Oba Seidu Adubiaran 1929-1930
- Oba Shitu 1930
- Oba Amida Abanikanda 1930-1939
- Oba Kosiru Ayinde 1939-1952
- Oba Rufai Adegoroye Ajani 1953-1957
- Oba Samuel Omotoso Abimbola 1958- 1982
- Oba Asiru Olatunbosun Tadese 1992 - 2012
- Oba Abdulrasheed Adewale Akanbi (2016 - )
