= Westland University, Iwo =

University in Nigeria

Westland University
- Motto: Latin: Deo Gratias
- Motto in English: "Thanks be to God"
- Type: Private
- Established: 2019
- Students: 5,000
- Location: Iwo, Osun State, Nigeria; 7°41′20″N 4°11′47″E
- Campus: Urban
- Website: Official website
- Location in Nigeria

Westland University, Iwo, is a private owned institution based in Iwo, Osun State, Nigeria.

== History ==
The institution was established in 1984, by Dr Engr. Wole Adepoju as Cedarspring Technical Institute before becoming a full-fledged university in 2019. Westland University was granted a provisional license by the Federal Executive Council to commenced academic programmes in 2019.

== Programmes ==
The National University Commission, NUC, have accredited and approved over 20 programmes at university.

Faculty of Social and Management Sciences

- B.Sc. Accounting
- B.Sc. Economics
- B.Sc. Business Administration
- B.Sc. Banking & Finance
- B.Sc. Political Science
- B.Sc. Mass Communication
- B.Sc. International Relations

Faculty of Basic Science and Computing

- B.Sc.Mathematics
- B.Sc. Computer Science
- B.Sc. Geology
- B.Sc. Software Engineering
- B.Sc. Physics with Electronics
- B.Sc. Chemistry

Faculty of Mass & Media, Communication/Library and Information Science

- BSc Journalism and Media Studies
- B.Sc.Publishing and Copyright Studies
- B.Sc .Library and Information Science
- B.Sc. Bibliotherapy Science
- B.Sc. Advertising and Multimedia Studies
- B.Sc. Public Relation and Public Speech Making
