= List of presidents of Nigeria =

Seal of the president

Presidential flag

The president of Nigeria is the head of state and head of government of Nigeria, directly elected to a four-year term. Under the Nigerian Constitution, the officeholder leads the executive branch of the federal government and is the commander-in-chief of the Nigerian Armed Forces. After the Independence of Nigeria on 1 October 1960, the first head of state was the queen of Nigeria Elizabeth II, who was also the monarch of other Commonwealth realms; she was represented by a governor-general. Nigeria became a republic under the 1963 constitution and the queen was replaced by a president; Nnamdi Azikiwe, the second governor-general after independence became the first president. Azikiwe shared power with the elected Prime Minister Abubakar Tafawa Balewa. Shehu Shagari was the first elected president of Nigeria. The incumbent president is Bola Tinubu, who assumed office on 29 May 2023. Since the office was established in 1963, 14 men have served in 16 presidencies; the discrepancy arises from two individuals who served two non-consecutive terms; as military head of states and as elected presidents: Olusegun Obasanjo and Muhammadu Buhari.

The interim government of Ernest Shonekan, who was deposed 83 days after taking office in 1993, was the shortest in Nigeria's history. Johnson Aguiyi-Ironsi, who served 194 days in office, was the shortest ruled military head of state. Yakubu Gowon served as the longest, for almost nine years, before being deposed in 1975 while he was away from the country. Olusegun Obasanjo served as the longest ruled president, for eleven years, two hundred and thirty days; of his combined two terms.

Four heads of state died in office: two were assassinated during a military coup (Johnson Aguiyi-Ironsi and Murtala Muhammed) and two died of natural causes (Sani Abacha and Umaru Musa Yar'Adua). Five heads of state were deposed in a military coup (Nnamdi Azikiwe, Yakubu Gowon, Shehu Shagari, Muhammadu Buhari and Ernest Shonekan). Obasanjo and Abdulsalami Abubakar resigned after Nigeria's transition to democracy in 1979 and 1999 respectively, while Ibrahim Babangida was forced to resign after he cancelled the 1993 presidential election, which SDP candidate Moshood Abiola reportedly won. Obasanjo was the first vice president (called chief of staff) to become head of state following the 1976 military coup attempt, while Goodluck Jonathan was the first democratically elected vice president to become president after Yar'Adua died on 5 May 2010.

== First Republic (1963–1966) ==
The First Republic was the republican government of Nigeria between 1963 and 1966 governed by the first republican constitution. The country's government was based on a federal form of the Westminster system. The period between 1 October 1960, when the country gained its independence, and 15 January 1966, when the first military coup d’état took place, is also generally referred to as the First Republic. The first Republic of Nigeria was ruled by different leaders representing their regions as premiers in a federation during this period.

No.	Portrait	Name (Birth–Death)	Term of office			Political party	Prime minister(s)	Ref.
No.	Portrait	Name (Birth–Death)	Took office	Left office	Time in office	Political party	Prime minister(s)	Ref.
1	Portrait of Nnamdi Azikiwe	Nnamdi Azikiwe (Note: Under the 1963 Constitution of the First Nigerian Republic (1963–1966), the first constitution of the Federal Republic of Nigeria, Nigeria ran the parliamentary system of government with a prime minister and the president replacing the monarch as ceremonial head of state. The president was elected by Parliament for a five-year term. In the event of a vacancy the president of the Senate would have served as acting president.) (1904–1996)	1 October 1963	16 January 1966	2 years, 107 days	National Council of Nigeria and the Cameroons	Abubakar Tafawa Balewa	

== Military Government (1966–1979) ==
The military dictatorship in Nigeria was a period when members of the Nigerian Armed Forces held power in Nigeria from 1966 to 1999 with an interregnum from 1979 to 1983. The military was able to rise to power often with the tacit support of the elite through coup d'états. Since the country became a republic in 1963, there had been a series of military coups.

No.	Portrait	Name (Birth–Death)	Term of office			Political party	Vice president(s)	Ref.
No.	Portrait	Name (Birth–Death)	Took office	Left office	Time in office	Political party	Vice president(s)	Ref.
2	Portrait of Johnson Aguiyi Ironsi	Major general Johnson Aguiyi-Ironsi (1924–1966)	16 January 1966	29 July 1966 X	194 days	Supreme Military Council	Babafemi Ogundipe	
3	Portrait of Yakubu Gowon	General; Yakubu Gowon (born 1934)	1 August 1966	29 July 1975	8 years, 362 days	Supreme Military Council	J. E. A. Wey	
4	Portrait of Murtala Mohammed	General; Murtala Muhammed (1938–1976)	29 July 1975	13 February 1976 X	199 days	Supreme Military Council	Olusegun Obasanjo	
5	Portrait of Olusegun Obasanjo	General; Olusegun Obasanjo (born 1937)	13 February 1976	1 October 1979	3 years, 230 days	Supreme Military Council	Shehu Musa Yar'Adua	

== Second Republic (1979–1983) ==
The Second Nigerian Republic was a brief formation of the Nigerian state which succeeded the military governments formed after the overthrow of the first republic.

No.	Portrait	Name (Birth–Death)	Term of office			Political party	Elected	Vice president(s)	Ref.
No.	Portrait	Name (Birth–Death)	Took office	Left office	Time in office	Political party	Elected	Vice president(s)	Ref.
6	Portrait of Shehu Shagari	Shehu Shagari (Note: Under the 1979 Constitution of the Second Nigerian Republic (1979–1983), the President was both head of state and government. In the event of a vacancy the vice president would have served as acting president.) (1925–2018)	1 October 1979	31 December 1983	4 years, 91 days	National Party of Nigeria	1979 1983	Alex Ekwueme	

== Military Government (1983–1993) ==
The military dictatorship in Nigeria was a period when members of the Nigerian Armed Forces held power in Nigeria from 1966 to 1999 with an interregnum from 1979 to 1983. The military was able to rise to power often with the tacit support of the elite through coup d'états. Since the country became a republic in 1963, there had been a series of military coups.

No.	Portrait	Name (Birth–Death)	Term of office			Political party	Vice president(s)	Ref.
No.	Portrait	Name (Birth–Death)	Took office	Left office	Time in office	Political party	Vice president(s)	Ref.
7	Portrait of Major Muhammadu Buhari	Major General; Muhammadu Buhari (Note: Muhammadu Buhari was made military head of state following the coup d'ètat of 1983, which overthrew the Second Republic and gave rise to Military dictatorship in Nigeria from 1983 to 1993.) (1942–2025)	31 December 1983	27 August 1985	1 year, 239 days	Supreme Military Council	Tunde Idiagbon	
8	Portrait of Ibrahim Babangida	General; Ibrahim Babangida (born 1941)	27 August 1985	26 August 1993	7 years, 364 days	Armed Forces Ruling Council	Ebitu Ukiwe Augustus Aikhomu	

== Third Nigerian Republic (1993) ==
The Third Republic was the planned republican government of Nigeria in 1992, intended to operate under the Third Republican Constitution. The political framework of the proposed republic included democratically elected state governors, state assemblies, and a national assembly serving as the federal legislature. However, the system was not fully democratic, as there was no democratically elected president.

The transition programme initiated by then-President Ibrahim Babangida was later perceived as a strategy to retain executive authority while conferring only limited legislative powers on the National Assembly. Under this arrangement, all bills passed by the Senate and the House of Representatives required approval from the National Defence and Security Council before receiving presidential assent.

Although Babangida adopted the title of "President"—a departure from the "Head of State" designation used by earlier military rulers—he repeatedly postponed the conduct of presidential elections. The election eventually held on 12 June 1993 was annulled by his administration.

No.	Portrait	Name (Birth–Death)	Term of office			Political party	Vice president(s)	Ref.
No.	Portrait	Name (Birth–Death)	Took office	Left office	Time in office	Political party	Vice president(s)	Ref.
9	Ambassador Bob Dewar with Shonekan	Ernest Shonekan (Note: Chief Ernest Shonekan became the interim head of state following the crisis of the Third Republic.) (1936–2022)	26 August 1993	17 November 1993	83 days	Independent	—N/a	

== Military Government (1993–1999) ==
The military dictatorship in Nigeria was a period when members of the Nigerian Armed Forces held power in Nigeria from 1966 to 1999 with an interregnum from 1979 to 1983. The military was able to rise to power often with the tacit support of the elite through coup d'états. Since the country became a republic in 1963, there had been a series of military coups.

No.	Portrait	Name (Birth–Death)	Term of office			Political party	Vice president(s)	Ref.
No.	Portrait	Name (Birth–Death)	Took office	Left office	Time in office	Political party	Vice president(s)	Ref.
10		General; Sani Abacha (Note: General Sani Abacha led the palace coup d'ètat of 1993 which overthrew the Interim National Government.) (1943–1998)	17 November 1993	8 June 1998	4 years, 203 days	Provisional Ruling Council	Oladipo Diya	
11	Portrait of Abdulsalami Abubakar	General; Abdulsalami Abubakar (born 1942)	9 June 1998	29 May 1999	354 days	Provisional Ruling Council	Michael Akhigbe	

== Fourth Republic (1999–present) ==
The Fourth Republic is the current republican government of Nigeria. Since 1999, it has governed the country according to the fourth republican constitution. Nigeria adopted the constitution of the Fourth Republic on 29 May 1999.

No.	Portrait	Name (Birth–Death)	Term of office			Political party	Elected	Vice president(s)	Ref.
No.	Portrait	Name (Birth–Death)	Took office	Left office	Time in office	Political party	Elected	Vice president(s)	Ref.
12	Portrait of Olusegun Obasanjo	Olusegun Obasanjo (born 1937)	29 May 1999	29 May 2007	8 years, 0 days	People's Democratic Party	1999 2003	Atiku Abubakar	
13	Portrait of Umaru Musa Yar'Adua	Umaru Musa Yar'Adua (1951–2010)	29 May 2007	5 May 2010	2 years, 341 days	People's Democratic Party	2007	Goodluck Jonathan	
14	Portrait of Goodluck Jonathan	Goodluck Jonathan (born 1957)	6 May 2010	29 May 2015	5 years, 23 days	People's Democratic Party	2011	Namadi Sambo	
15	Portrait of Muhammadu Buhari	Muhammadu Buhari (1942–2025)	29 May 2015	29 May 2023	8 years, 0 days	All Progressives Congress	2015 2019	Yemi Osinbajo	
16	Portrait of Bola Tinubu	Bola Tinubu (born 1952)	29 May 2023	Incumbent	3 years, 145 days	All Progressives Congress	2023	Kashim Shettima	

== See also ==
- List of traditional titles borne by the heads of state of Nigeria
