= National Council of States =

Highest policy making body of the Nigerian state

- Coat of arms of Nigeria

Council overview
- Formed: 30 July 1975
- Headquarters: Aso Rock Presidential Villa, Abuja, Federal Capital Territory, Nigeria
- Council executives: Bola Ahmed Tinubu, President of Nigeria, Chairman; Kashim Shettima, Vice President of Nigeria, Vice Chairman

The National Council of States or simply the Council of State is an organ of the Nigerian Government. Its functions include advising the executive on policy making. The Council has no executive power, however plays an important advice and consent role in government operations.

== Origins ==
In April 1952, Sir Abubakar Tafawa Balewa advocated for the creation of a Nigerian Privy Council to domestically replace the Privy Council of the United Kingdom in a speech to the Legislative Council in April 1952. This was due to its judicial committee's seemingly insensitivities to regional differences in court cases. In the First Nigerian Republic, there was no National Council of State as the Premiers occasionally they met with Sir Abubakar Tafawa Balewa, then the Prime Minister of Nigeria.

== Establishment ==
The idea of the National Council of State was first introduced by General Murtala Muhammed on 30 July 1975 in a broadcast to the nation after deposing General Yakubu Gowon:

"The structure of government has been re-organised. There will now be three organs of Government, at the Federal level namely: The Supreme Military Council, The National Council of State, and the Federal Executive Council."

— Murtala Muhammed, Head of State of Nigeria,

He then appointed the following governors as members of the council of state:

- Muhammed Buhari (North-East)
- George Innih (Mid-West)
- Sani Bello (Kano)
- Adekunle Lawal
- Paul Omu (South-East)
- Ibrahim Taiwo (Kwara)
- Akintunde Aduwo (West)
- Anthony Ochefu (East-Central)
- Usman Jubrin (North-Central)
- Abdullahi Mohammed (Benue-Plateau)
- Umaru Mohammed (North-West)
- Zamani Lekewot (Rivers).

The 1979 constitution enlarged the composition of the Council of State to its current size.

== Composition of the Council of State ==
The Council of State consists of the following persons:

- President, who is the Chairman
- Vice-President, who is the Deputy Chairman
- All former Presidents of the Federation and all former Heads of the Government of the Federation
- All former Chief Justices of Nigeria
- President of the Senate
- Speaker of the House of Representatives
- All the Governors of the states of the Federation
- Minister of Justice and Attorney General of the Federation

=== Current composition ===
Name	Office
Bola Tinubu	President of Nigeria
Kashim Shettima	Vice President of Nigeria
Lateef Fagbemi	Minister of Justice and Attorney General of the Federation
Godswill Akpabio	President of the Senate of Nigeria
Tajudeen Abbas	Speaker of the House of Representatives of Nigeria
Goodluck Jonathan	14th President of Nigeria
Olusegun Obasanjo	5th and 12th President of Nigeria
Abdulsalami Abubakar	11th Head of State of Nigeria
Ibrahim Babangida	8th President of Nigeria
Yakubu Gowon	3rd Head of State of Nigeria

== Duties ==
The council has responsibilities in advising the President in the exercise of his/her powers with respect to the following: national population census and compilation, publication and keeping of records, prerogative of mercy, awarding of national honours, the appointment of members of the Independent National Electoral Commission, the appointment of members of the National Judicial Council (other than ex-officio members of that Council), and the appointment of members of the National Population Commission.

It also advises the President whenever requested to do so on the maintenance of public order within the Federation or any part thereof and on such other matters as the President may direct. It has acted during the COVID-19 pandemic in Nigeria as well as during times of economic crisis.

== See also ==
- Privy Council (United Kingdom)
- National Economic Council (Nigeria)
- National Security Council (Nigeria)
- National Defence Council (Nigeria)
- Nigeria Police Council
- State Council of Traditional Rulers and Chiefs
