= List of traditional titles borne by the heads of state of Nigeria =

Nigeria operates a two-tier honours system. Whereas the national honours of Nigeria are within the gift of the Federal Government itself, titles in the Nigerian chieftaincy system fall under the purview of the monarchs of the sub-national traditional states of the country. A number of the Heads of State that have served since Independence in 1960 have therefore held such traditional titles, either due to their hereditary background or to their personal achievement.

== Monarch (1960–1963) ==
The succession to the Nigerian throne was the same as the succession to the British one.

Queen of Nigeria			Reign			Royal House	Title
No.	Portrait	Name (birth–death)	Start	End	Duration	Royal House	Title
1		Elizabeth II (1926–2022)	1 October 1960	1 October 1963	3 years	Windsor	Although the Queen's royal styles and titles in Nigeria were "Elizabeth the Second, Queen of Nigeria and of Her other Realms and Territories, Head of the Commonwealth", she didn't formally receive any Nigerian traditional titles. However, her official title of "Queen of Nigeria" was often translated into the national languages of the country during her reign (for example, Yoruba: Oba Obirin ti Ile Naijiria).

=== Governor-General ===
The Governor-General was the representative of the monarch in Nigeria and exercised most of the powers of the monarch. The Governor-General was appointed for an indefinite term, serving at the pleasure of the monarch.

Governor-General		Term of office			Monarch	Title
No.	Name (birth–death)	Took office	Left office	Time in office	Monarch	Title
1	Sir James Robertson (1899–1983)	1 October 1960	16 November 1960	46 days	Elizabeth II	No traditional title known.
2	Dr. Nnamdi Azikiwe (1904–1996)	16 November 1960	1 October 1963	2 years, 319 days	Elizabeth II	Dr. Azikiwe was the Oziziani Obi of Onitsha, this being a personal chieftaincy title. He would later receive a hereditary title after leaving office.

== First Republic (1963–1966) ==
Under the 1963 Constitution, the first constitution of the Republic of Nigeria, Nigeria ran the parliamentary system of government with a prime minister and the President replacing the monarch as ceremonial head of state.

President			Term of office			Political party	Title
No.	Portrait	Name (birth–death)	Took office	Left office	Time in office	Political party	Title
1		Dr. Nnamdi Azikiwe (1904–1996)	1 October 1963	16 January 1966	2 years, 107 days	National Council of Nigeria and the Cameroons	Dr. Azikiwe was the Oziziani Obi of Onitsha.

== Military rule (1966–1979) ==
In 1966, Major Chukwuma Kaduna Nzeogwu led a bloody coup d'état which overthrew the First Nigerian Republic.

Head of state			Term of office			Military	Title
No.	Portrait	Name (birth–death)	Took office	Left office	Time in office	Military	Title
2		Major General; Johnson Aguiyi-Ironsi (1924–1966)	16 January 1966	29 July 1966 (assassinated.)	194 days	Federal Military Government	No traditional title known
3		General; Yakubu Gowon (born 1934)	1 August 1966	29 July 1975 (deposed.)	8 years, 362 days	Federal Military Government	No traditional title known
4		General; Murtala Mohammed (1938–1976)	29 July 1975	13 February 1976 (assassinated.)	199 days	Federal Military Government	No traditional title known (although General Mohammed's mother was a member of the Jobawa clan, a Kano dynasty that provides the Makama of Kano on a hereditary basis)
5		General; Olusegun Obasanjo (born 1937)	13 February 1976	1 October 1979 (resigned.)	3 years, 230 days	Federal Military Government	No traditional title at the time

== Second Republic (1979–1983) ==
Under the 1979 Constitution, the second constitution of the Republic of Nigeria, the President was head of both state and government.

President			Term of office			Political party	Elected	Title
No.	Portrait	Name (birth–death)	Took office	Left office	Time in office	Political party	Elected	Title
6		Alhaji Shehu Shagari (1925–2018)	1 October 1979	31 December 1983 (deposed.)	4 years, 91 days	National Party of Nigeria	1979; 1983	In addition to a variety of other chieftaincy titles, Alhaji Shagari held that of the Turaki of Sokoto.

== Military rule (1983–1993) ==
Major-General Muhammadu Buhari led a coup d'état which overthrew President Shagari and his government.

Head of state			Term of office			Military	Title
No.	Portrait	Name (birth–death)	Took office	Left office	Time in office	Military	Title
7	Muhammadu Buhari Portrait	Major General; Muhammadu Buhari (1942–2025)	31 December 1983	27 August 1985 (deposed.)	1 year, 239 days	Supreme Military Council	No traditional title at the time
8		General; Ibrahim Babangida (born 1941)	27 August 1985	26 August 1993 (resigned.)	7 years, 364 days	Armed Forces Ruling Council	No traditional title known

== Interim National Government (1993) ==
Following the annulment of the 1993 Nigerian presidential election which terminated the transition to the Third Nigerian Republic, General Babangida resigned from office. He signed a decree establishing the Interim National Government led by Chief Ernest Shonekan.

President			Term of office			Political party (at time of start of term)	Title
No.	Portrait	Name (birth–death)	Took office	Left office	Time in office	Political party (at time of start of term)	Title
9		Chief Ernest Shonekan (1936–2022)	26 August 1993	17 November 1993 (deposed.)	83 days	Independent	In addition to a variety of other chieftaincy titles, Chief Shonekan held that of the Abese of Egbaland.

== Military rule (1993–1999) ==
In November 1993, General Sani Abacha overthrew the interim government, and ruled the country with an iron fist thereafter. In 1998, following Abacha's death, General Abdulsalami Abubakar became head of state and ushered in the Fourth Nigerian Republic.

Head of state			Term of office			Military	Title
No.	Portrait	Name (birth–death)	Took office	Left office	Time in office	Military	Title
10		General; Sani Abacha (1943–1998)	17 November 1993	8 June 1998 (died in office.)	4 years, 203 days	Provisional Ruling Council	No traditional title known
11		General; Abdulsalami Abubakar (born 1942)	8 June 1998	29 May 1999 (resigned.)	355 days	Provisional Ruling Council	No traditional title at the time

== Fourth Republic (1999–present) ==
Under the fourth Constitution of the Republic of Nigeria, the President is head of both state and government.

Status

Denotes Vice President acting as President

President			Term of office			Political party	Elected	Title
No.	Portrait	Name	Took office	Left office	Time in office	Political party	Elected	Title
12		Chief Olusegun Obasanjo (born 1937)	29 May 1999	29 May 2007	8 years	People's Democratic Party	1999; 2003	In addition to a variety of other chieftaincy titles, Chief Obasanjo holds that of the Olori Omo Ilu of Ibogun-Olaogun.
13		Alhaji Umaru Musa Yar'Adua (1951–2010)	29 May 2007	5 May 2010 (Note: Goodluck Jonathan was Acting President from 9 February to 5 May 2010) (died in office.)	2 years, 341 days	People's Democratic Party	2007	Alhaji Yar'Adua was the Matawalle of Katsina, a chieftaincy position that is hereditary within his family.
14		Dr. Goodluck Jonathan (born 1957)	6 May 2010	29 May 2015	5 years, 23 days	People's Democratic Party	2011	During his presidency, Dr. Jonathan was awarded the chieftaincy title of the Se lolia I of Wakirike Bese.
15		Muhammadu Buhari (1942–2025)	29 May 2015	29 May 2023	8 years	All Progressives Congress	2015; 2019	In addition to a variety of other chieftaincy titles, President Buhari held that of the Ikeogu I of Igboland.
16		Chief Bola Tinubu (born 1952)	29 May 2023	Incumbent	3 years, 133 days	All Progressives Congress	2023	Chief Tinubu holds two chieftaincy titles; he is the Asiwaju of Lagos and the Jagaba of Borgu.
