= Vice President of Nigeria =

Second-highest constitutional office in Nigeria

Vice President of the Federal Republic of Nigeria
- Seal of the vice president

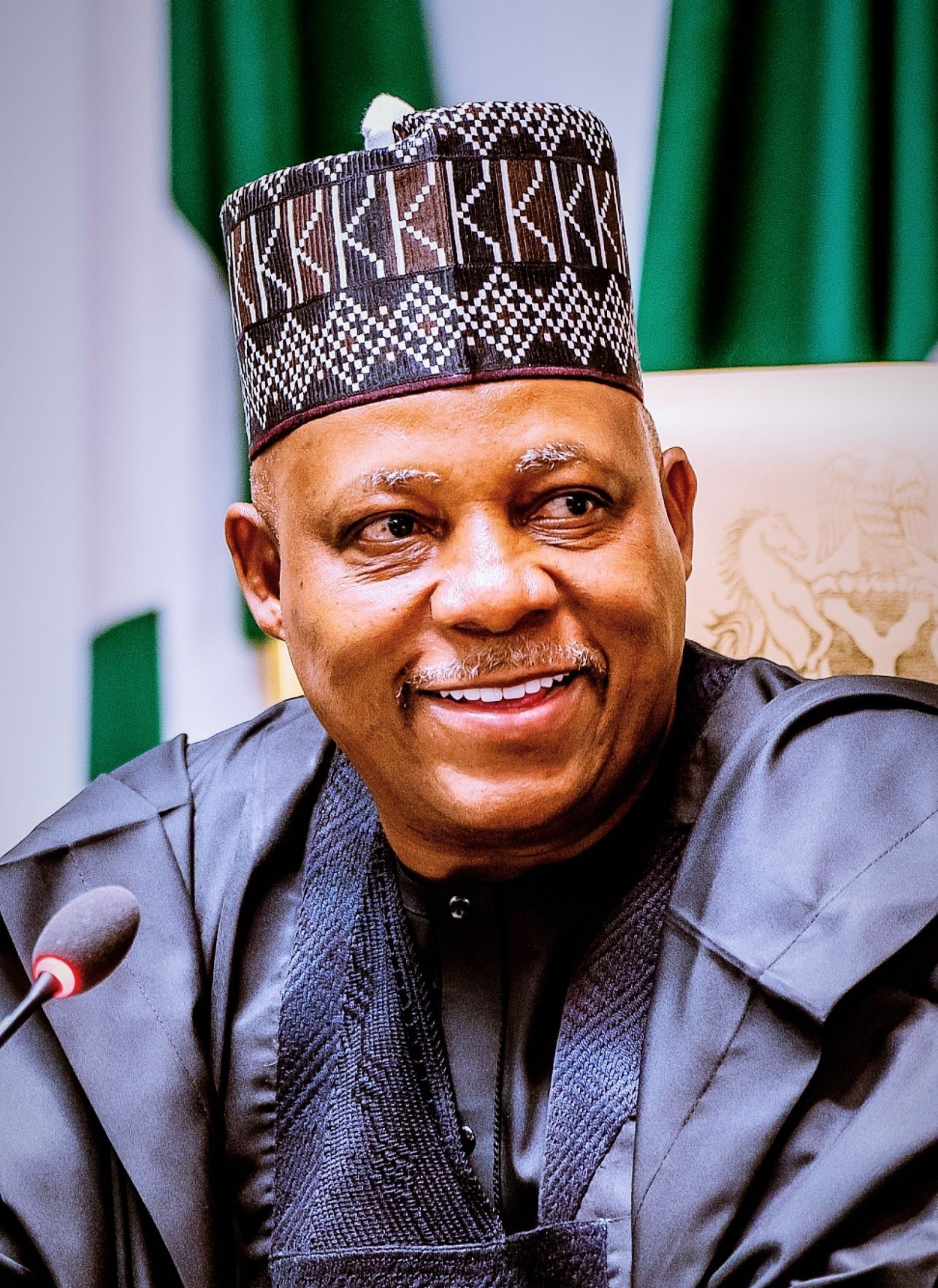
- Incumbent; Kashim Shettima since 29 May 2023
- Executive Branch of the Federal Government; Office of the Vice President
- Style: Mr. Vice President; His Excellency; The Honourable
- Status: Second highest executive branch officer
- Abbreviation: V-POFRON
- Member of: Federal Executive Council; Council of State; National Security Council; National Defence Council; Nigeria Police Council; National Economic Council
- Residence: Akinola Aguda House
- Seat: Abuja, F.C.T.
- Nominator: Presidential candidate
- Appointer: Direct popular election or, if vacant, President via National Assembly confirmation
- Term length: Four years, renewable once
- Constituting instrument: Constitution of Nigeria
- Inaugural holder: Babafemi Ogundipe (Military); Alex Ifeanyichukwu Ekwueme (Elected)
- Formation: 16 January 1966 (60 years ago)
- Succession: First
- Unofficial names: THE VP
- Salary: ₦12,126,000 annually
- Website: statehouse.gov.ng

The vice president of Nigeria is the second-highest official in the executive branch of the federal government of Nigeria, after the president of Nigeria, and ranks first in the presidential line of succession. Officially styled Vice President of the Federal Republic of Nigeria, the vice president is directly elected together with the president to a four-year term of office.

Kashim Shettima is the 15th and current vice president of Nigeria, he assumed office on 29 May 2023.

== Selection ==
=== Eligibility ===
Candidates eligible for the office of vice president must be a citizen of Nigeria by birth, at least 40 years of age, a member of a political party and is sponsored by that political party.

=== Oath of office ===
The Constitution of Nigeria specifies an oath of office for the vice president of the federation. The oath is administered by the chief justice of the Supreme Court of Nigeria or the person for the time being appointed to exercise the functions of that office. It is the same oath recited by deputy state governors, ministers, commissioners and special advisers to the president.

I, do solemnly swear/affirm that I will be faithful and bear true allegiance to the Federal Republic of Nigeria; that as Vice-President of the Federal Republic of Nigeria, I will discharge my duties to the best of my ability, faithfully and in accordance with the Constitution of the Federal Republic of Nigeria and the law, and always in the interest of the sovereignty, integrity, solidarity, well-being and prosperity of the Federal Republic of Nigeria; that I will strive to preserve the Fundamental Objectives and Directive Principles of State Policy contained in the Constitution of the Federal Republic of Nigeria; that I will not allow my personal interest to influence my official conduct or my official decisions, that I will to the best of my ability preserve, protect and defend the Constitution of the Federal Republic of Nigeria; that I will abide by the Code of Conduct contained in the Fifth Schedule to the Constitution of the Federal Republic of Nigeria; that in all circumstances, I will do right to all manner of people, according to law, without fear or favour, affection or ill-will; that I will not directly or indirectly communicate or reveal to any person any matter which shall be brought under my consideration or shall become known to me as Vice-President of the Federal Republic of Nigeria. So help me God.

== Functions of the vice president ==
The Vice President of Nigeria is assisted in the execution of his/her functions by the Office of the Vice President, which is managed by the Deputy Chief of Staff in the Office of President, currently Ibrahim Hadejia.

=== Political powers ===
Although the vice president may take an active role in establishing policy in the executive branch by serving on such committees and councils, the relative power of the Nigerian vice president depends upon the duties delegated by the president. The vice president cannot make executive orders or decisions without the assent of the president because the president holds full executive and presidential powers.

=== Representative functions ===
The vice president as the second highest official in the Nigerian government also has a role of representing the president in diplomatic occasions, military occasions, council meetings, federal committees and events or any occasions as necessary. Contrary to some opinions that the vice president has a statutory function of representing the president in any of these occasions, according to the Nigerian constitution, it is still the prerogative of the president to choose whoever is serving in the federal cabinet or the executive branch of government to represent him in any of those occasions.

=== Line of succession ===
The vice president by a matter of law is not an assistant to the president, the office is fully and independently presidential, it's executive powers are hibernated until the president is unable to function by any means, in which case he or she becomes the acting president. In the instance of resignation, impeachment or death of the president, the vice president being the first in line of succession becomes the president of Nigeria.

=== Membership ===
The executive functions of the Nigerian vice president includes participation in all cabinet meetings by statute and membership in the National Security Council, Federal Executive Council, the National Defence Council the Nigeria Police Council and a constitutional role of being the chairman of the National Economic Council.

== Residence ==
The vice president of Nigeria resides at Akinola Aguda House. The residence was completed and commissioned in 2024. The Federal Government maintains an official residence for the Vice President in Lagos State for use during official functions outside the capital. Under the Obasanjo government, the Vice President utilized an alternative residence within Abuja that now serves as the official quarters of the Chief Justice of Nigeria.

== List of vice presidents ==
=== Military government (1966–1979) ===
Major Chukwuma Kaduna Nzeogwu orchestrated the bloody military coup d'état of 1966 which overthrew the First Republic, parliamentary system of government was abolished and the office of the Vice President was established with Babafemi Ogundipe becoming the first Vice President as Chief of Staff, Supreme Headquarters.

Chief of Staff			Term of office			Military	Head of State
No.	Portrait	Name (birth–death)	Took office	Left office	Time in office	Military	Head of State
1		Brigadier; Babafemi Ogundipe (1924–1971)	16 January 1966	29 July 1966 (deposed.)	194 days	Central Military Government	Major General Johnson Aguiyi-Ironsi
2		Vice Admiral; Joseph Edet Akinwale Wey (1918–1991)	1 August 1966	29 July 1975 (deposed.)	8 years, 362 days	Federal Military Government	General Yakubu Gowon
3		Lieutenant General; Olusegun Obasanjo (born 1937)	29 July 1975	13 February 1976 (Became Head of State after the assassination of Murtala)	199 days	Federal Military Government	General Murtala Muhammed
4		Major General; Shehu Musa Yar'Adua (1943–1997)	13 February 1976	30 September 1979 (Handed over to civilian government)	3 years, 229 days	Federal Military Government	General Olusegun Obasanjo

=== Second Republic (1979–1983) ===
Under the 1979 Constitution, the second constitution of the Federal Republic of Nigeria, the president was both head of state and government. The president along with the vice president were elected for a four-year term. In the event of a vacancy, the vice president would have served as acting president.

Vice President			Term of office			Political party	Elected	President
No.	Portrait	Name (birth–death)	Took office	Left office	Time in office	Political party	Elected	President
5		Alex Ifeanyichukwu Ekwueme (1932–2017)	1 October 1979	31 December 1983 (deposed.)	4 years, 91 days	National Party of Nigeria	1979; 1983	Alhaji Shehu Shagari

=== Military government (1983–1993) ===
Major-General Muhammadu Buhari was made military head of state following the coup d'ètat of 1983, which overthrew the Second Republic, Major General Tunde Idiagbon became the Chief of Staff, Supreme Headquarters. The position would later be referred to as the Chief of the General Staff.

Chief of Staff/ Vice President			Term of office			Military	Head of State/ President
No.	Portrait	Name (birth–death)	Took office	Left office	Time in office	Military	Head of State/ President
6		Major General; Tunde Idiagbon (1943–1999)	31 December 1983	27 August 1985 (deposed.)	1 year, 239 days	Supreme Military Council	Major General Muhammadu Buhari
7		Commodore; Ebitu Ukiwe (born 1940)	27 August 1985	October 1986 (resigned.)	1 year, 35 days	Armed Forces Ruling Council	General Ibrahim Babangida
8		Admiral; Augustus Aikhomu (1939–2011)	October 1986	26 August 1993 (Handed over to interim government)	6 years, 329 days	Armed Forces Ruling Council	General Ibrahim Babangida

=== Interim National Government (1993) ===
Chief Ernest Shonekan was made interim head of state of Nigeria following the crisis of the Third Republic. He initially announced his vice president to be Moshood Abiola the supposed winner of the 12 June 1993 elections, which the latter rejected stating he was the rightful successor to the presidency.

Vice President	Period			Head of State
Vacant	26 August 1993	17 November 1993	83 days	Chief Ernest Shonekan

=== Military government (1993–1999) ===
General Sani Abacha led the palace coup d'ètat of 1993 which overthrew the Interim National Government, Lieutenant General Oladipo Diya became the Chief of General Staff.

Chief of General Staff			Term of office			Military	Head of State
No.	Portrait	Name (birth–death)	Took office	Left office	Time in office	Military	Head of State
9		Lieutenant General; Donaldson Oladipo Diya (1944–2023)	17 November 1993	21 December 1997 (Deposed and arrested for attempted coup)	4 years, 34 days	Provisional Ruling Council	General Sani Abacha
Vacant (170 days)							General Sani Abacha
10		Vice Admiral; Michael Akhigbe (1946–2013)	9 June 1998	29 May 1999 (Handed over to civilian government)	354 days	Provisional Ruling Council	General Abdulsalami Abubakar

=== Fourth Republic (1999–present) ===
Under the fourth Constitution of the Republic of Nigeria, the president is head of both state and government. The president along with the vice president are elected for a four-year renewable term. In the event of a vacancy, the Vice President serves as acting president.

Vice President			Term of office			Political party	Elected	President
No.	Portrait	Name	Took office	Left office	Time in office	Political party	Elected	President
11		Atiku Abubakar (born 1946)	29 May 1999	29 May 2007	8 years, 0 days	People's Democratic Party	1999; 2003	Chief Olusegun Obasanjo
12		Goodluck Ebele Jonathan (born 1957)	29 May 2007	6 May 2010 (Became President after the death of Yar'Adua)	2 years, 342 days	People's Democratic Party	2007	Alhaji Umaru Musa Yar'Adua
Vacant (13 days)								Goodluck Jonathan
13		Namadi Sambo (born 1954)	19 May 2010	29 May 2015	5 years, 10 days	People's Democratic Party	2011	Goodluck Jonathan
14		Yemi Osinbajo (born 1957)	29 May 2015	29 May 2023	8 years, 0 days	All Progressives Congress	2015; 2019	Muhammadu Buhari
15		Kashim Shettima (born 1966)	29 May 2023	Incumbent	3 years, 154 days	All Progressives Congress	2023	Bola Tinubu

== Vice presidents by time in office ==
Rank	Vice president	Political party	Total time in office	Cause of end of term
1	Joseph Edet Akinwale Wey	Military	8 years, 362 days	Deposed
2	Atiku Abubakar	People's Democratic Party	8 years	Natural expiration
2	Yemi Osinbajo	All Progressives Congress	8 years	Natural expiration
4	Augustus Aikhomu	Military	6 years, 329 days	Resignation
5	Namadi Sambo	People's Democratic Party	5 years, 10 days	Natural expiration
6	Alex Ifeanyichukwu Ekwueme	National Party of Nigeria	4 years, 91 days	Deposed
7	Donaldson Oladipo Diya	Military	4 years, 34 days	Deposed and arrested for treason
8	Shehu Musa Yar'Adua	Military	3 years, 229 days	Resignation
9	Kashim Shettima	All Progressives Congress	3 years, 154 days	In office
10	Goodluck Ebele Jonathan	People's Democratic Party	2 years, 342 days	Death of Yar'Adua
11	Tunde Idiagbon	Military	1 year, 239 days	Deposed
12	Ebitu Ukiwe	Military	1 year, 35 days	Resignation
13	Michael Akhigbe	Military	354 days	Resignation
14	Olusegun Obasanjo	Military	199 days	Assassination of Murtala Muhammed
15	Babafemi Ogundipe	Military	194 days	Deposed

== See also ==
- List of governors and governors-general of Nigeria
- List of heads of state of Nigeria
- List of heads of government of Nigeria
