= Nigeria Police Council =

The Nigeria Police Council is a consultative body mandated by the Constitution of Nigeria to support the president of Nigeria on matters of the Nigeria Police Force and law enforcement. It provides general supervision of the police and to advise the President on the appointment of the Inspector-General.

== History ==
The council was established in 1960, following the adoption of the new constitution. It originally consisted of the following officials:

- Designated Minister of the Government of the Federation, who shall serve as chairman
- Designated Minister of the Government of each region
- Chairman of the Police Service Commission

At the time, the Nigeria Police Council had the ability to make recommendations to the Government with respect to any matter under its supervision, with such recommendations needing to be laid before both Houses of the Parliament of Nigeria. Following the 1966 Nigerian coup d'état, the Nigeria Police Council consisted of the Head of the Federal Military Government, as its chairman, the Armed Forces Chief of Staff, the Inspector General of Police and his Deputy, the Military Governors, and the Attorney General of the Federation. The Secretary to the Government of the Federation was designated as the Secretary to the council. It was reestablished in February 1989 under the Ibrahim Babangida government to replace the PSC. The new council, under direct presidential control, consisted of the following individuals:

- President (chairman)
- Chief of General Staff
- Minister of Internal Affairs
- Inspector General of Police

== Members (outside of state governors) ==
The Police Council is composed of the President, all state Governors, the Chairman of the Police Service Commission, and the Inspector General of Police.

Post	Photo	Incumbent
President (Chairman)	Portrait of Bola Tinubu	Bola Tinubu
Vice President of Nigeria		Kashim Shettima
Inspector General of Police		Tunji Disu
Chairman of the Police Service Commission		Hashimu Argungu

== See also ==
- National Security Council (Nigeria)
- National Police Chiefs' Council
