= President of the Senate of Nigeria =

Highest ranking officer

President of the Senate of the Federal Republic of Nigeria
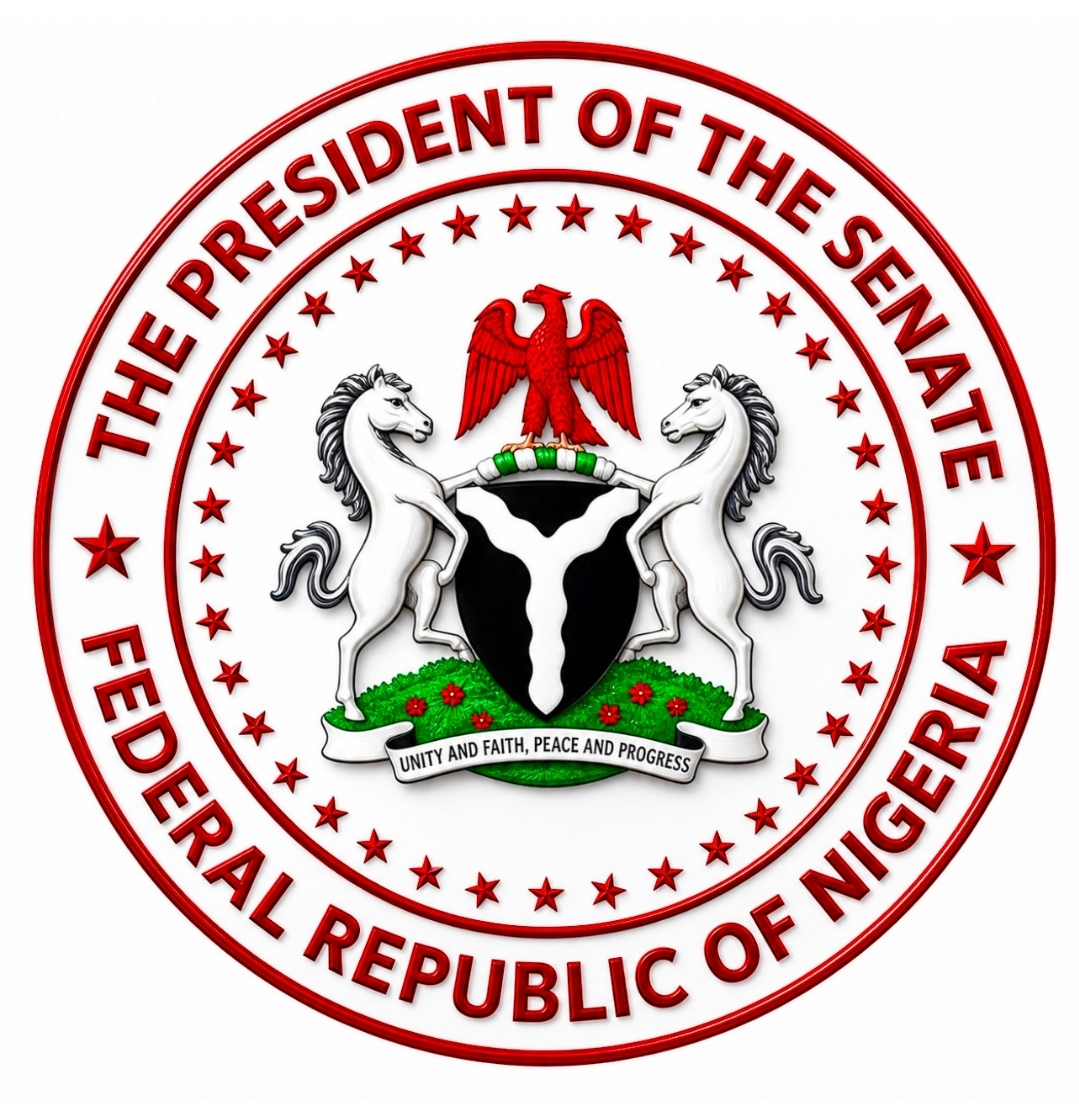
- Seal of the Senate President of Nigeria

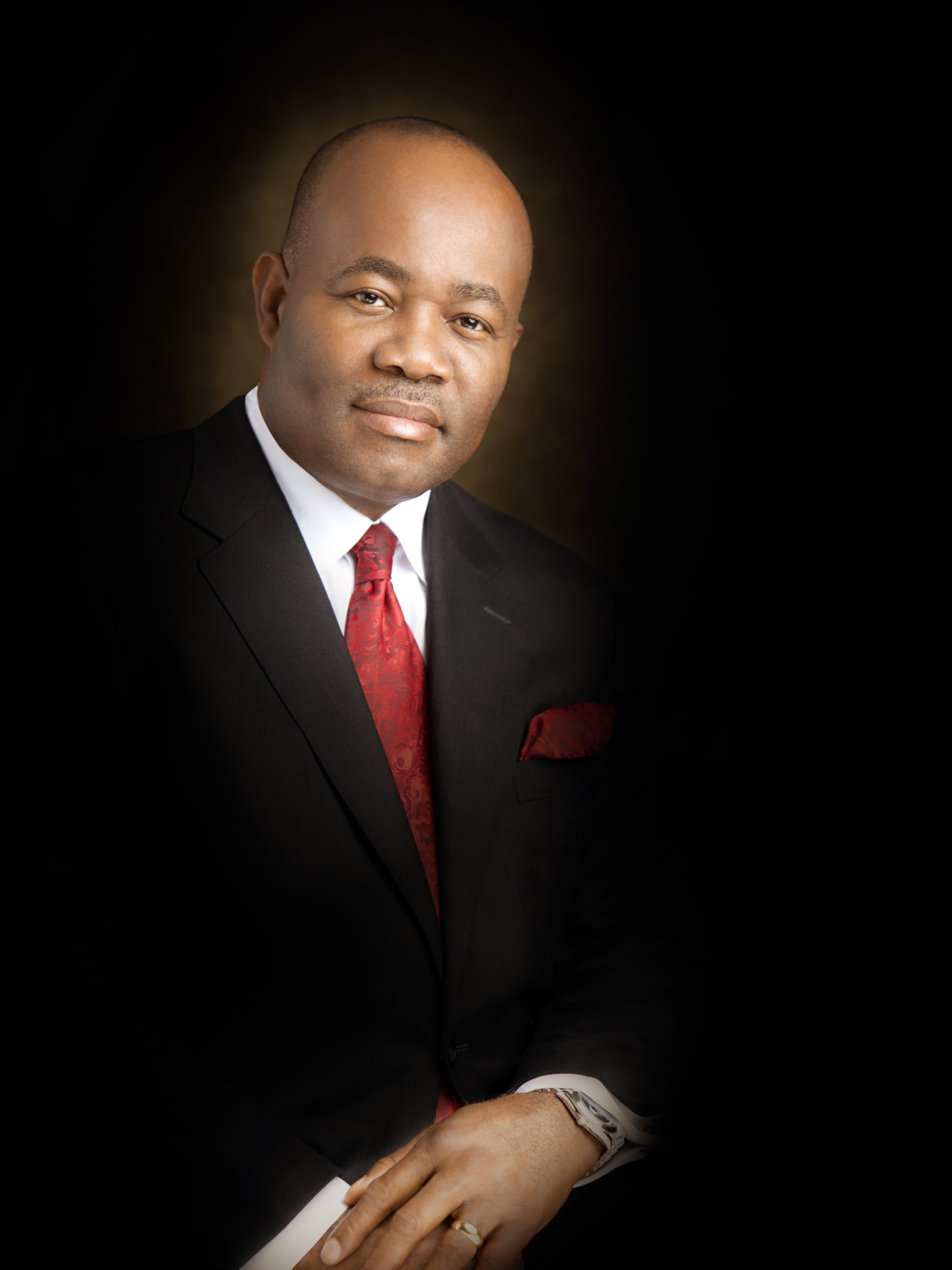
- Incumbent; Godswill Akpabio since 13 June 2023
- Legislative Branch of the Federal Government
- Style: Mr President
- Member of: Nigerian Senate; National Assembly Commission
- Seat: National Assembly Complex, Three Arms Zone, Abuja
- Appointer: Indirect Senate Election
- Term length: 4 years renewable
- Constituting instrument: Constitution of Nigeria
- Inaugural holder: Nnamdi Azikiwe
- Formation: 1 January 1960; 66 years ago
- Succession: Second
- Deputy: Deputy President of the Senate

The president of the Nigerian Senate is the presiding officer of the Senate of Nigeria, elected by its membership. The senate president is second in line of succession to the Nigerian presidency, after the vice president of Nigeria. The current president of the Senate is Godswill Akpabio since 13 June 2023.

== Role ==
The senate president is chosen in an indirect election conducted within the senate, amongst the 109 members. The line of succession to the Nigerian presidency goes to the vice president, and then the senate president should both the president and vice president be unable to discharge the powers and duties of office.

== List of Nigerian Senate presidents ==
=== Federation ===
| Senate President | | Term of office | | Political party |
| Portrait | Name | Took office | Left office | Political party |
|---|---|---|---|---|
| | Nnamdi Azikiwe | 1 January 1960 | 1 October 1960 | National Council of Nigeria and the Cameroons |
| | Dennis Osadebay | 1 October 1960 | 1 October 1963 | National Council of Nigeria and the Cameroons |

=== First Republic ===
| Senate President | | Term of office | | Political party |
| Portrait | Name | Took office | Left office | Political party |
|---|---|---|---|---|
| | Nwafor Orizu | 1 October 1963 | 15 January 1966 | National Council of Nigeria and the Cameroons |

=== Military Government ===
The Senate did not sit during this time.

=== Second Republic ===
| Senate President | | Term of office | | Political party | Elected |
| Portrait | Name | Took office | Left office | Political party | Elected |
|---|---|---|---|---|---|
| | Joseph Wayas | 1 October 1979 | 31 December 1983 | National Party of Nigeria | 1979; 1983 |

=== Military Government ===
The Senate did not sit during this time.

=== Third Republic ===
| Senate President | | Term of office | | Political party | Constituency | Elected |
| Portrait | Name | Took office | Left office | Political party | Constituency | Elected |
|---|---|---|---|---|---|---|
| | Iyorchia Ayu | 5 December 1992 | November 1993 | Social Democratic Party | Benue North-West | 1992 |
| | Ameh Ebute | November 1993 | 17 November 1993 | Social Democratic Party | Benue South | 1993 |

=== Military Government ===
The Senate did not sit during this time.

=== Fourth Republic ===
| Senate President | | Term of office | | Political party | Constituency | Elected |
| Portrait | Name | Took office | Left office | Political party | Constituency | Elected |
|---|---|---|---|---|---|---|
| | Evan Enwerem | 3 June 1999 | 18 November 1999 | People's Democratic Party | Imo East | 1999 |
| | Chuba Okadigbo | 18 November 1999 | 8 August 2000 | People's Democratic Party | Anambra North | 1999 |
| | Anyim Pius Anyim | 8 August 2000 | 3 June 2003 | People's Democratic Party | Ebonyi South | 2000 |
| | Adolphus Wabara | 3 June 2003 | 5 April 2005 | People's Democratic Party | Abia South | 2003 |
| | Ken Nnamani | 5 April 2005 | 5 June 2007 | People's Democratic Party | Enugu East | 2005 |
| | David Mark | 5 June 2007 | 6 June 2015 | People's Democratic Party | Benue South | 2007 |
| | David Mark | 5 June 2007 | 6 June 2015 | People's Democratic Party | Benue South | 2011 |
| | Bukola Saraki | 9 June 2015 | 9 June 2019 | All Progressives Congress to 2018 | Kwara Central | 2015 |
| | Bukola Saraki | 9 June 2015 | 9 June 2019 | People's Democratic Party from 2018 | Kwara Central | 2015 |
| | Ahmed Ibrahim Lawan | 11 June 2019 | 11 June 2023 | All Progressives Congress | Yobe North | 2019 |
| | Godswill Akpabio | 13 June 2023 | Incumbent | All Progressives Congress | Akwa Ibom North-West | 2023 |
