= National Assembly Complex =

Seat of the National Assembly of the Federal Republic of Nigeria

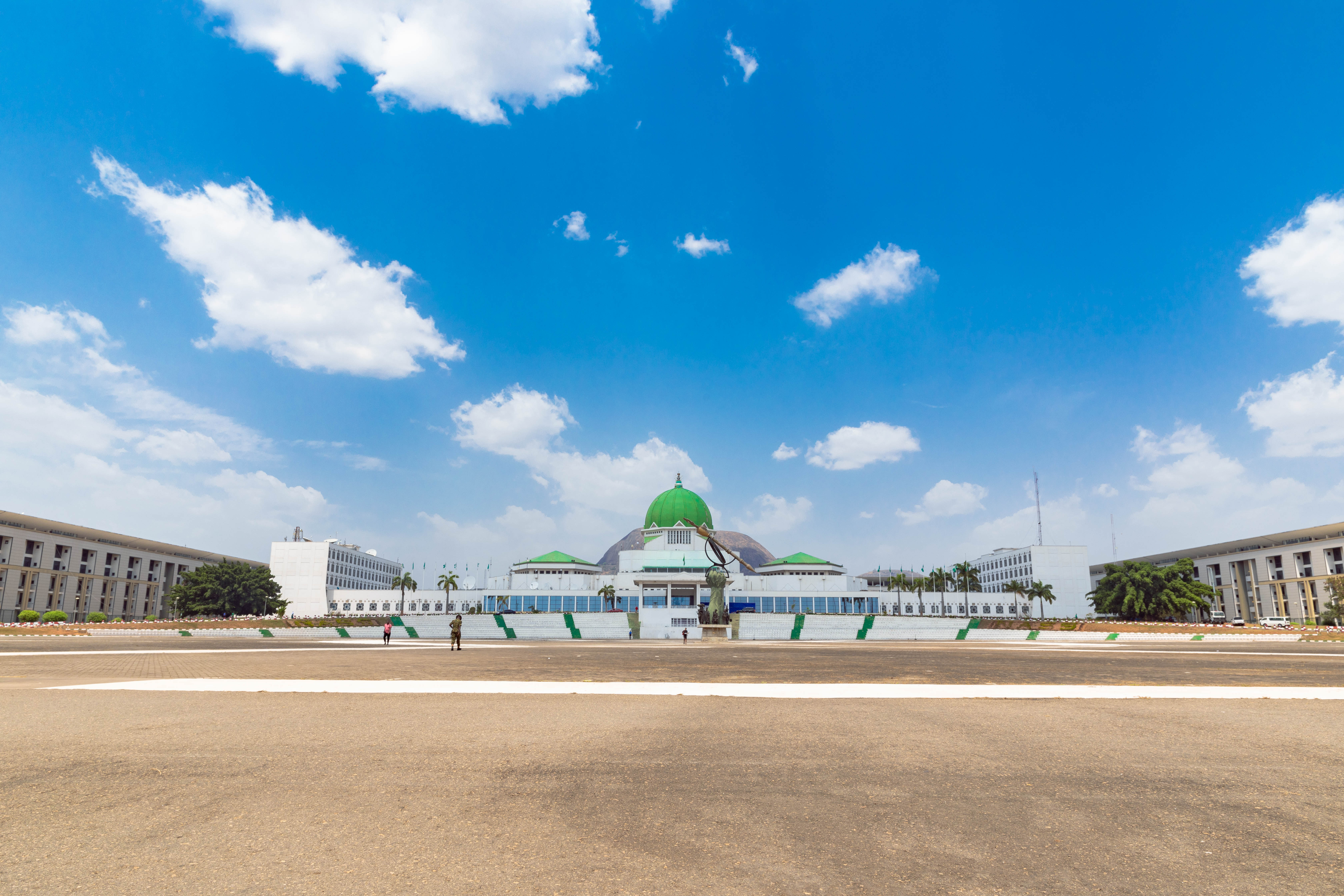
- The National Assembly Complex
- Interactive map of the National Assembly Complex area
- Alternative names: NASS Complex

General information
- Status: Completed
- Architectural style: Neoclassicism
- Location: Three Arms Zone, Abuja, FCT, Nigeria
- Cost: ₦7 billion
- Owner: Federal Government of Nigeria

Technical details
- Floor area: 40,000 m^{2}

Design and construction
- Architecture firm: ITB Nigeria, Julius Berger

The National Assembly Complex is the seat of the National Assembly, the apex legislative body of the Federal Republic of Nigeria. It is a beehive of legislative activities and a major landmark in Abuja.

== Construction ==
The Phase 2 of the National Assembly Complex, known as the White House was built between 1996 and 1999 at a cost of nearly $35.18 million and the contract was awarded to ITB Nigeria, on February 18, 1996, through the Department of Public Building, FCDA. The Phase 3 of the National Assembly Complex was awarded to Julius Berger and completed in 2007, it included the addition of two five-storey buildings to serve as wing buildings for the two houses- Senate of Nigeria and House of Representatives (Nigeria) at both sides of the green dome-shaped White House. The Phase 3 has a gross floor area of 70,700 m^{2} (84,600 yd^{2}).

== Location ==
The Complex is located in the Three Arms Zones of the Federal Capital City. The complex is surrounded by other government buildings like the Supreme Court Complex, Old Presidential Complex (now Shagari Complex), Office of the National Security Adviser (ONSA), National Counterterrorism Centre (NCTC), Residence of the Vice President, Aso Rock Villa, SSS National Headquarters and the National Arboretum.

== White House ==
The White House is the conspicuously-dominant central building in the National Assembly Complex directly opposite the Ceremonial Plaza, it hosts the Red Chamber for the Senate to the east and the Green Chamber for the House of Representatives (Nigeria) to the west and serviced by a central atrium. The building is ceremonially covered by a green dome with the Coat of Arms of the Federal Republic of Nigeria mounted on the dome. The massive Aso Rock stands in the background. The building has a gross floor area of 40,400 square metres (48,300 square yards). Electrical and mechanical installation include Central air-conditioning system, CCTV, access control system, fire detection and fire fighting system.

== Bola Tinubu Building ==
The National Assembly Complex also hosts the National Assembly Library and Resource Centre. The construction of the edifice started during the 9th Assembly of the National Assembly presided over by Senate President Ahmed Lawan and House Speaker Femi Gbajabiamila, and was completed and commissioned in May 2024. The National Assembly Library and Resource Centre building was named after Bola Tinubu.
