= National Economic Council (Nigeria) =

The National Economic Council (NEC) in Nigeria is a constitutional entity of the Federal Government of Nigeria tasked with evaluating the nation's economic state and devising strategies to promote equitable development and regional balance. It was established under Section 153 of the 1999 Constitution and meets monthly at State House in Abuja, serving as a centralized hub to align macroeconomic planning, trade objectives, mitigation programs, and developmental policies. The chairman of the NEC is the Vice President of Nigeria (currently Kashim Shettima).

== History ==
The establishment of the NEC is rooted in Section 153 of the 1999 Constitution of Nigeria, which outlines its creation alongside other critical federal executive bodies. It was designed to replace prior ad-hoc or military-era economic planning commissions under the Supreme Military Council.

== Membership ==
The membership consists of:

- Vice President of Nigeria (Chairman)
- All 36 incumbent state governors in Nigeria
- Governor of the Central Bank of Nigeria
- Federal Minister of Budget and Economic Planning

== Functions ==
The council reviews national fiscal targets, manages emergency financial interventions for state governments, deliberates on agricultural transformations, and implements frameworks for revenue diversification. In February 2026, the council convened its second NEC conference at the State House.

=== Sub-Committees ===
The NEC regularly operates active temporary sub-committees which include:

- Technical Sub-Committee on Livestock Development
- Committee on Legacy Projects (Chaired by the Governor of Cross River State, Bassey Otu)

== See Also ==
- Economy of Nigeria
- Central Bank of Nigeria
