= Nigerian presidential line of succession =

Order of assuming powers of the Nigerian presidency

The Nigerian presidential line of succession is the set order of Nigerian government officials who may become or act as president upon the incapacity, death, resignation, or removal from office (by impeachment and subsequent disqualification) of a sitting president or a president-elect.

The line of succession is set out in the Nigerian Constitution and follows the order of the Vice President and Senate President. While the Vice President succeeding to the Presidency is a given, Section 146 (2) of the Constitution gives the Senate President the powers of the Presidency for a three-month window. A general election must be called before the window elapses. In May 2010, the death of President Umaru Musa Yar'Adua triggered the succession order, leading to the succession of his Vice as President of the Federal Republic of Nigeria.

== Current order ==
The current presidential line of succession to the office of the president of Nigeria is specified by the 1999 Constitution. The line of presidential succession follows the order of: vice president and president of the Senate. In case of death, permanent disability, or inability of these officials, the National Assembly shall, by law, provide for the manner of selection of the person who is to act as president until a president or vice president shall have qualified.

Contrary to popular belief, the presidential line of succession does not include the speaker of the House of Representatives and the chief justice.

=== Current line of succession ===
No.	Position	Incumbent	Party
1	Vice President of Nigeria	Kashim Shettima	APC
2	President of the Senate of Nigeria	Godswill Akpabio	APC
