= Enugu State Electricity Regulatory Commission =

Agency that oversee electricity operations

The Enugu State Electricity Regulatory Commission (EERC) also known as Enugu Electricity Regulatory Commission is the agency that oversee electricity operations in Enugu State, Nigeria.

== History ==
EERC was established by the enactment of the 2023 Enugu State Electricity Law of the Constitution of the Federal Republic of Nigeria. It took over full regulatory oversight of the state’s electricity market from the Nigerian Electricity Regulatory Commission in October 2024.

It is the first Independent Power Project (IPP) in Enugu State to build a 10 megawatts power plant.
