= Federal Executive Council (Nigeria) =

Nigeria's Federal Executive Council

- Coat of arms of Nigeria

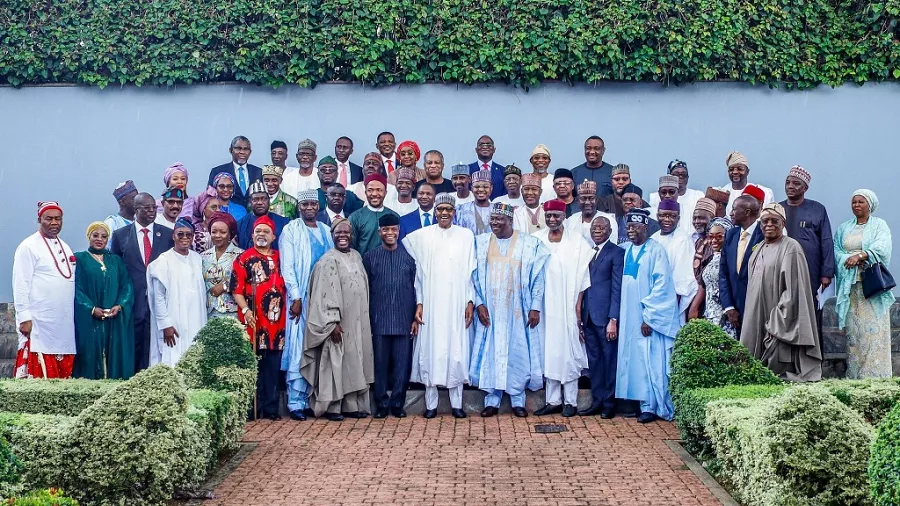
- The second Federal Executive Council of President Muhammadu Buhari.

Council overview
- Formed: 1963
- Preceding Council: Council of Ministers
- Headquarters: Aso Rock Presidential Villa, Abuja, Federal Capital Territory, Nigeria
- Council executives: Bola Tinubu, President of Nigeria, Chairman; Kashim Shettima, Vice President of Nigeria, Vice Chairman; George Akume, Secretary to the Government of the Federation; Femi Gbajabiamila, Chief of Staff
- Key documents: Constitution of Nigeria; Ministers' Statutory Powers and Duties Act

The Federal Executive Council (FEC), also simply known as the Cabinet, is the cabinet of ministers of the Federal Republic of Nigeria and is part of the executive branch of the Government of Nigeria. The council's role, as written in the Ministers' Statutory Powers and Duties Act, is to serve as an advisory body to the President of Nigeria, who serves as the FEC's chairman. Members of the cabinet are appointed by and report to the President, who can dismiss them at will. The cabinet currently consists of 24 Federal Ministries, each responsible for some aspect of providing government services, as well as a number of parastatals (government-owned corporations).

== History ==
=== The Council of Ministers ===
The Council of Ministers was established in the 1960 Constitution of Nigeria and was the chief decision-making body of the Nigerian Government. Members of the council were selected by the prime minister and is composed of senior ministers of state who administer the executive departments and ministries of the federal government. Ministers were appointed by the president on the advice of the prime minister, who was the leader of the Cabinet. The Council of Ministers was collectively responsible to Parliament for any advice given to the President.

=== Introduction of the FEC ===
The Federal Executive Council was established by Decree No. 1 of 1966, under the Constitution decree enacted following the 1966 Nigerian coup d'état which brought Johnson Aguiyi-Ironsi to power. This decree granted the Federal Military Government (FMG) unrestricted legislative powers across all parts of the country. Although the FEC was formally created, executive authority at the federal level remained vested in the Head of the FMG, who could act directly or through subordinates. Similarly, executive power at the regional level was exercised by Military Governors, who assumed all powers previously held by Regional Executive Councils. Initially, no new regional executive organs were formed, except in the Western Region, where a provisional Executive Council was established. Later, Decree No. 20 of 1966 provided for Executive Councils in all Regions, composed of the Military Governor, top Armed Forces and Police officers, and other members at the Governor’s discretion.

The Supreme Military Council could delegate powers to a Federal Executive Council, predominantly composed of civilian Commissioners. A major structural change occurred following the coup of 29 July 1975, which led to the dissolution of key government organs including the Supreme Military Council (SMC), the Federal Executive Council, and the various State Executive Councils. Upon reconstitution, the SMC assumed greater central authority.

The SMC appointed the 25-member Federal Executive Council (FEC) on August 6, 1975. Under the 1999 Constitution every State is required to have at least one Minister in the Federal Executive Council (FEC).

== Responsibilities and power ==
The cabinet has the power to:

1. Ensure the implementation of a uniform state policy in the areas of culture, science, education, health protection, social security and ecology;
2. Manage federal property;
3. Adopt measures to ensure the country's defense, state security, and the implementation of the foreign policy of Nigeria;
4. Implement measures to ensure the rule of law, human rights and freedoms, the protection of property and public order, and crime control;

The FEC also assists the President in carrying out the country's domestic and foreign policy as determined by the President.

=== Relationship to civil service ===
The ministries and parastatals are staffed by career civil servants. Each is headed by a Permanent Secretary, a senior civil servant appointed by the Head of the Civil Service. The Permanent Secretary is accountable to a Minister, who sits in the Cabinet and reports to the President. The Minister is appointed by the President subject to approval by the Senate and is responsible for policy, also while the Permanent Secretary is responsible for implementation of policy.

== Confirmation Process ==
The heads of the executive ministries are nominated by the President and then presented to the Senate. Section 147 (6) of the Nigerian constitution gives the Senate 21 days to complete the screening for confirmation or rejection by a simple majority. According to Section 147 (5) of the constitution the only qualification for one to be appointed as Minister is that the person must be “qualified for election into the House of Representatives”. If approved, they receive their commission scroll, are sworn in and then begin their duties.

=== Salary ===
The heads of the executive departments and most other senior federal officers at cabinet or sub-cabinet level receive their salary under a fixed pay plan as reviewed by the Revenue Mobilisation Allocation and Fiscal Commission (RMAFC). The annual basic salary of a substantive minister is ₦2,026,400 (₦168,866:66 per month).

== Structure ==
The Federal Executive Council (FEC) Chambers are housed at the Aso Rock Presidential Villa in Abuja.

=== Cabinet Affairs Office ===
The Cabinet Affairs Office (CAO), in the Office of the Secretary to the Government of the Federation (OSGF), has the responsibility for providing administrative and technical support to (the Federal Executive Council as well as the other two statutory Councils of the nation, the Council of State and the Nigeria Police Council.

== Ministries ==
According to the Nigerian Constitution, there must be at least one Cabinet member from each of the 36 states in Nigeria, the number of ministries is a factor of the president's discretion and at times the President takes direct control of a key ministry such as Petroleum Resources. To ensure representation from each state, a Minister is often assisted by one or more Ministers of State.

== See also ==
- Nigerian Civil Service
- State Executive Council (Nigeria)
- Federal Ministries of Nigeria
