= J. E. A. Wey =

De facto deputy head of state of Nigeria from 1966 to 1975

Vice admiral J. E. A. Wey

2nd Chief of Staff, Supreme Headquarters
- In office 1 August 1966 – 29 July 1975
- Head of State: Yakubu Gowon
- Preceded by: Babafemi Ogundipe
- Succeeded by: Olusegun Obasanjo

Chief of Naval Staff
- In office March 1964 – January 1973
- Preceded by: Commodore A.R. Kennedy
- Succeeded by: Rear Adm. N.B. Soroh

Personal details
- Born: 6 March 1918 Calabar, Southern Region, British Nigeria (now Calabar, Cross River, Nigeria)
- Died: 12 December 1991 (aged 73) Nigeria
- Party: None (military)
- Spouse: Anne Wey

Military service
- Allegiance: Nigeria
- Branch/service: Nigerian Navy
- Years of service: 1940-1975
- Rank: Vice admiral
- Battles/wars: Nigerian Civil War

Joseph Edet Akinwale Wey (6 March 1918 – 12 December 1991) was a Nigerian Navy Vice Admiral who served as head of the Nigerian Navy (i.e. Chief of Naval Staff), acting foreign minister, and chief of staff of the Supreme Headquarters, making him the de facto vice president of Nigeria during Yakubu Gowon's regime.

== Early life ==
Born in Calabar in March 1918 to a Yoruba father who was from Ogbomosho and an Efik mother, Wey had his early education in Calabar, Cross River State and at Methodist School, Ikot Ekpene in present Akwa Ibom State; and further education in Lagos.

== Naval career ==
He joined the Marine Department as a cadet and engineer in training around 1940. At the end of his training in 1945, he served in all sea-going vessels in the Marine Department. When the Navy was established in 1956, he was transferred to the Navy as a sub-lieutenant. In 1962, he was appointed as the commanding officer of base and naval officer in charge of Apapa, Lagos. In 1966, he was appointed as the Federal Commissioner of Establishment and he became a member of the Federal Executive Council. He was promoted to various ranks and to the final rank of vice-admiral.

== Retirement and death ==
He was retired in 1975 following the successful coup that brought Murtala Mohammed to power, replacing the military government of General Yakubu Gowon. He died 12 December 1991.

== Military ranks ==
Year	Insignia	Military rank
1950		Marine engineer
1956		Sub-lieutenant and engineer
1958		Lieutenant
1960		Lieutenant commander
1963		Captain
1964		Commodore
1967		Rear admiral
1971		Vice admiral
