= Military dictatorship in Nigeria =

Nigerian military government from 1966–1999

Federal Republic of Nigeria (1966; 1966–1979; 1983–1993; 1993–1999) Republic of Nigeria^{note} (1966)
- 1966–1979; 1983–1993; 1993–1999
- Flag Coat of arms
- Motto: "Peace, Unity, Freedom" (1966–1978) "Unity and Faith, Peace and Progress" (1978–1979; 1983–1993; 1993–1999)
- Anthem: Nigeria, We Hail Thee (1966–1978) Arise, O Compatriots (1978–1979; 1983–1993; 1993–1999)
- Capital: Lagos (1966–1979; 1983–1991) Abuja (1991–1993; 1993–1999)
- Largest city: Lagos
- Common languages: English; Hausa; Igbo; Yoruba and other regional languages
- Religion: Christianity; Islam; Traditional beliefs
- Government: Federal presidential republic under military dictatorship (January–May 1966; 1966–1979; 1983–1993; 1993–1999); Unitary presidential republic under military dictatorship (24 May 1966 – 31 August 1966)
- Head of State/ President
  - 1966: Johnson Aguiyi-Ironsi^{b}
  - 1966–1975: Yakubu Gowon
  - 1975–1976: Murtala Mohammed
  - 1976–1979: Olusegun Obasanjo
  - 1983–1985: Muhammadu Buhari
  - 1985–1993: Ibrahim Babangida
  - 1993–1998: Sani Abacha
  - 1998–1999: Abdulsalami Abubakar^{c}
- Chief of Staff / Vice President
  - 1966: Babafemi Ogundipe (first)
  - 1998–1999: Mike Akhigbe (last)
- Legislature: None (rule by decree)
- Historical era: Cold War
  - Established: 15 January 1966
  - Unification Decree: 24 May 1966
  - 1966 Nigerian counter-coup: 28 July 1966
  - Federal system restored: 31 August 1966
  - Biafra secession^{d}: 30 May 1967
  - 1975 Nigerian coup d'état: 29 July 1975
  - 1976 Nigerian coup d'état attempt: 13 February 1976
  - Second Republic: 1 October 1979
  - 1983 Nigerian coup d'état: 31 December 1983
  - 1985 Nigerian coup d'état: 27 August 1985
  - 1993 Nigerian coup d'état: 17 November 1993
  - Fourth Republic: 29 May 1999

Area
- 1991: 923,768 km^{2} (356,669 sq mi)

Population
  - 1991: 88,514,501
- Currency: Nigerian pound (1966–1973) Naira (₦) (1973–1979; 1983–1993; 1993–1999)
- Time zone: UTC+1 (WAT)
- ISO 3166 code: NG
Preceded by
First Nigerian Republic
Second Nigerian Republic
Succeeded by
Second Nigerian Republic
Third Nigerian Republic
Fourth Nigerian Republic
- Today part of: Nigeria; Cameroon^{e}
- ^a Formal name of the country from 24 May to 31 August 1966. ^b as Head of the Federal Military Government ^c as Chairman of the Provisional Ruling Council ^d until 15 January 1970 ^e Bakassi peninsula; governed by Nigeria until 2008

The military dictatorship in Nigeria was a period when members of the Nigerian Armed Forces held power in Nigeria from 1966 to 1999 with an interregnum from 1979 to 1983. The military was able to rise to power often with the tacit support of the elite through coup d'états. Since the country became a republic in 1963, there had been a series of military coups.

== Background ==
Military rule in Nigeria began with the coup d'état of 1966 which was planned and executed by a group of revolutionary nationalist officers. The coup started as a small rebellion cell under Emmanuel Ifeajuna. Major Chukwuma Kaduna Nzeogwu was the face of the coup attempt, which involved five other army majors: Timothy Onwuatuegwu, Chris Anuforo, Don Okafor, Adewale Ademoyega and Humphrey Chukwuka. It operated as a clandestine movement of junior officers during the post-independence period of 1960–1966. The plot received support from left-wing intellectuals, who rejected conservative elements in society, like the traditional establishment of Northern Nigeria and sought to overthrow the First Nigerian Republic.

== Military regimes ==
Heads of State of the military regimes

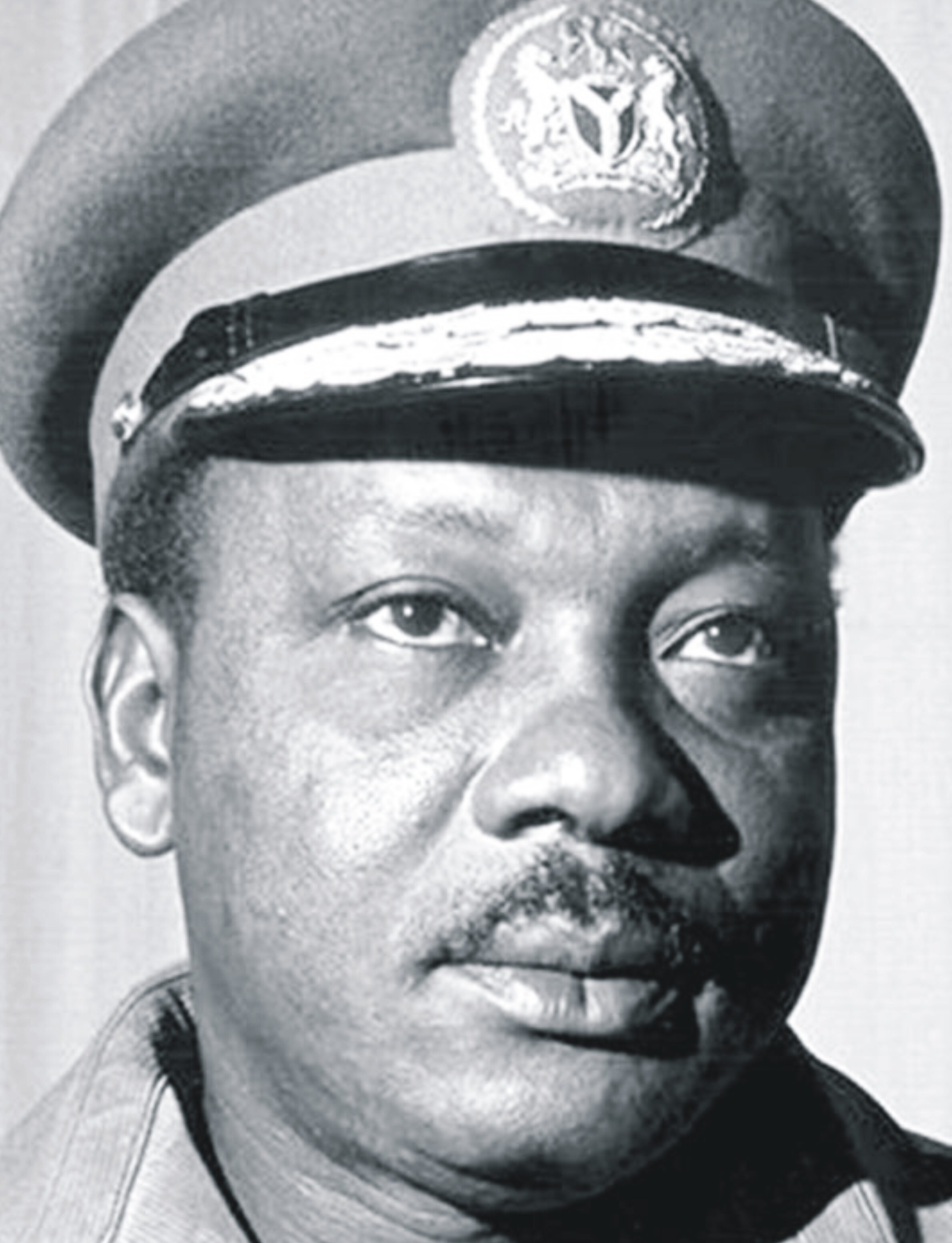
Major General Johnson Aguiyi-Ironsi

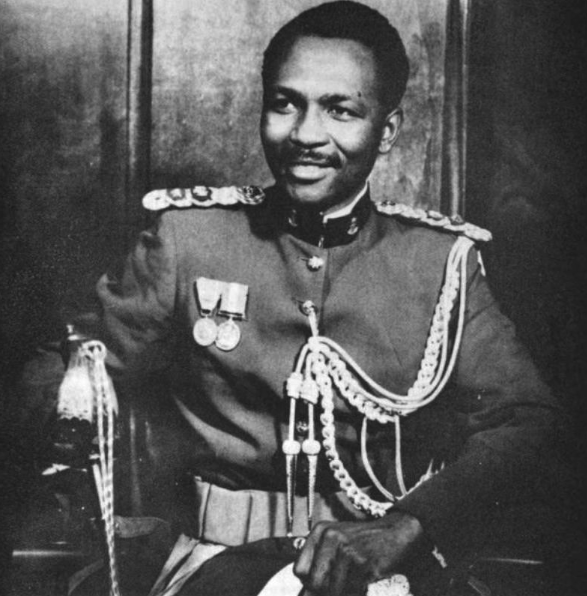
General Yakubu Gowon

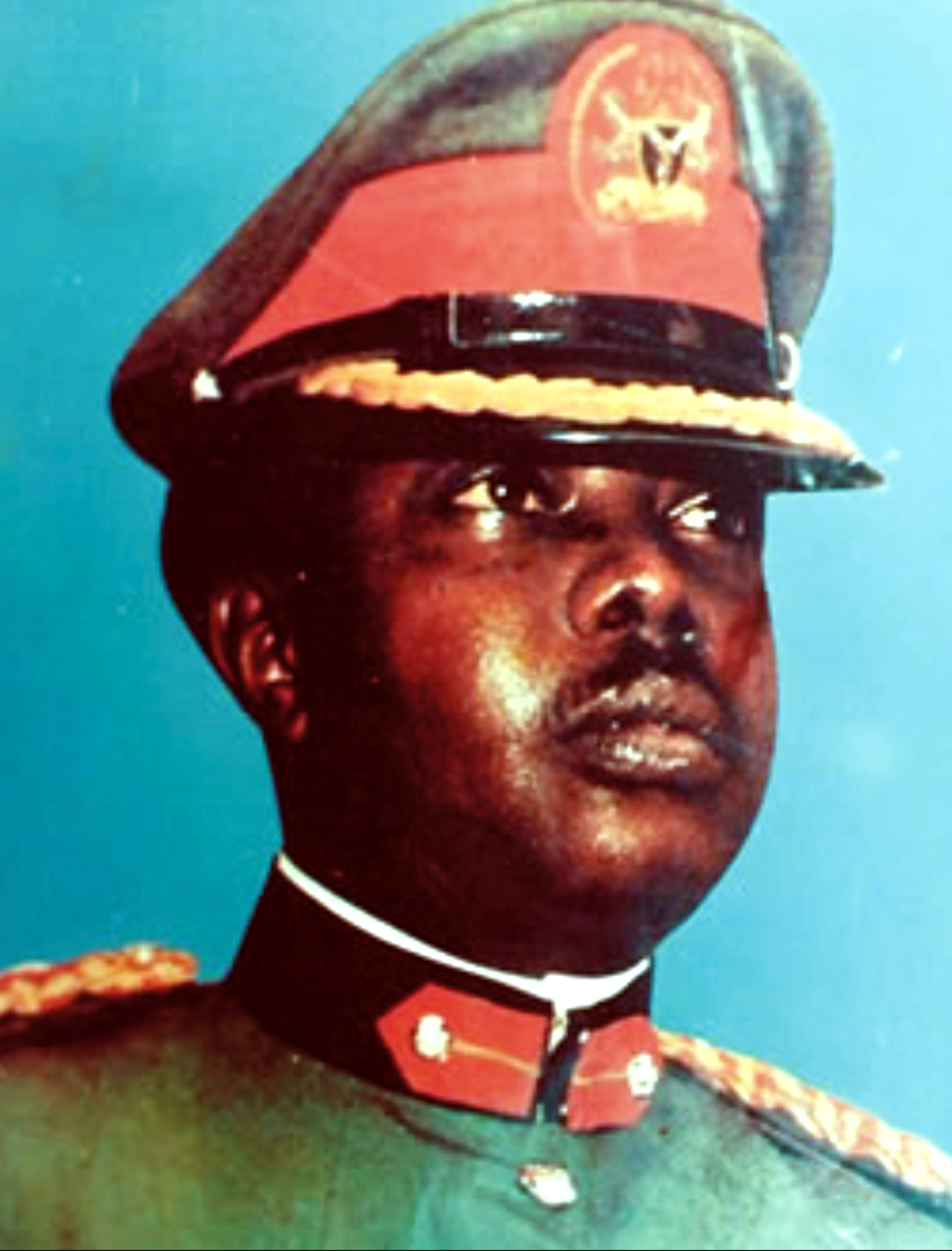
General Murtala Muhammed

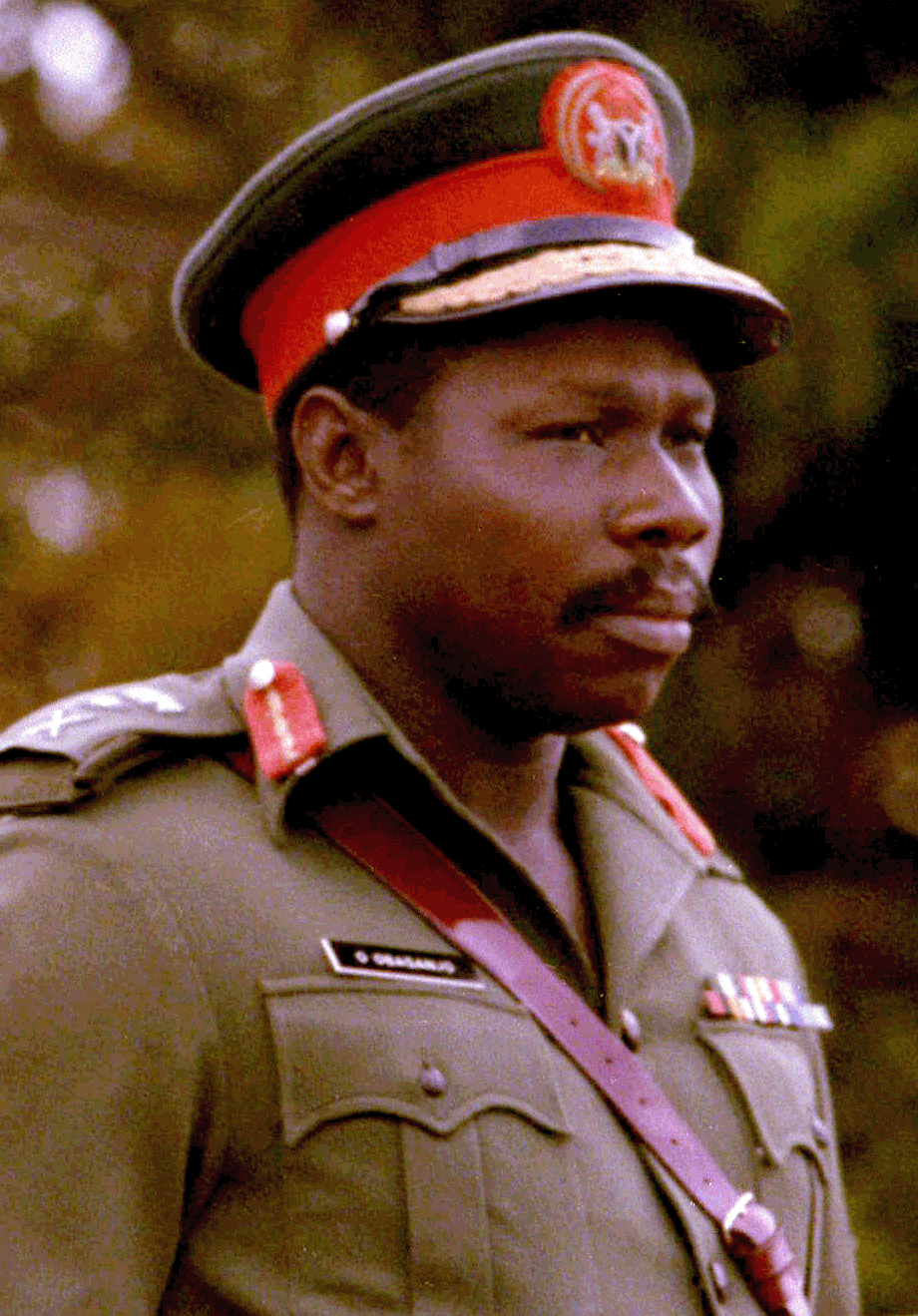
General Olusegun Obasanjo

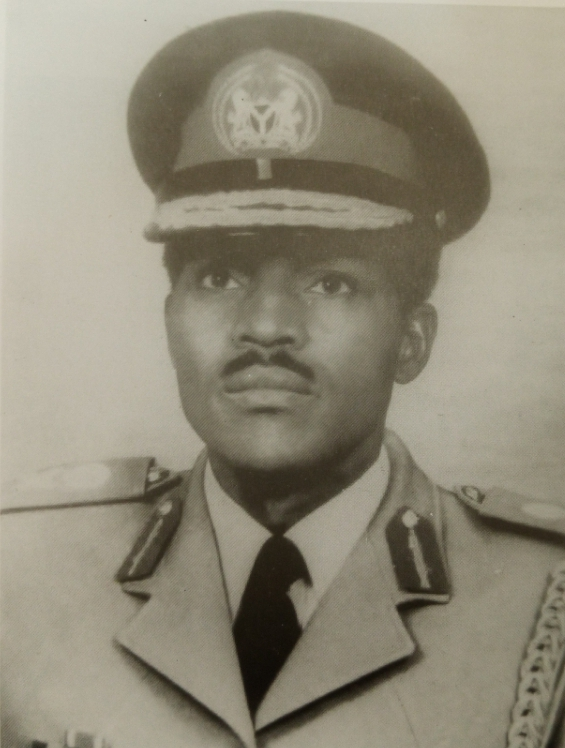
Major General Muhammadu Buhari

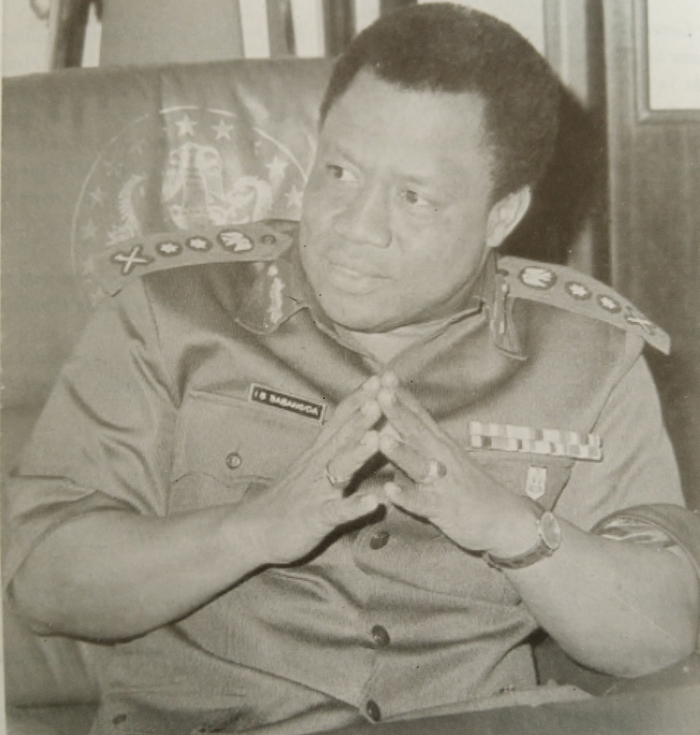
General Ibrahim Babangida

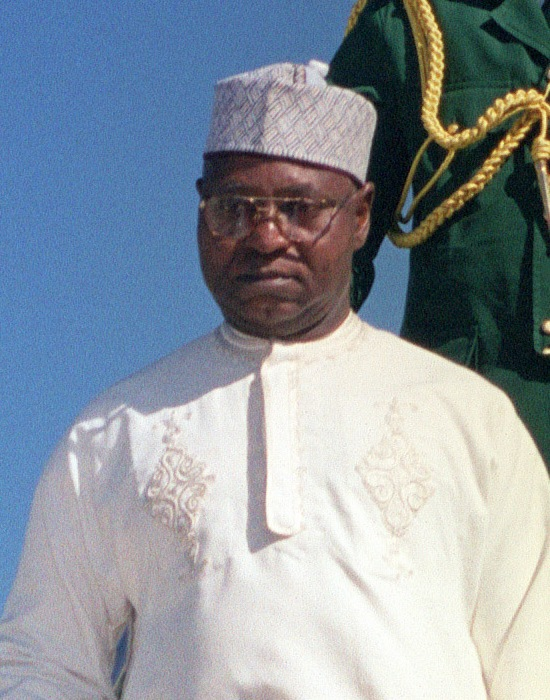
General Abdulsalami Abubakar

Major General Johnson Aguiyi-Ironsi was made the Head of the Federal Military Government of Nigeria, serving for six months before being overthrown and assassinated in the 1966 Nigerian counter-coup.

Aguiyi-Ironsi was succeeded by General Yakubu Gowon, who established a Supreme Military Council. Gowon held power until July 1975, when he was overthrown in another coup.

Brigadier (later General) Murtala Mohammed succeeded Gowon. Months later, in February 1976, Mohammed was assassinated by Buka Suka Dimka and others in a violent coup attempt. The plotters failed to kill Olusẹgun Ọbasanjọ, who then succeeded Murtala Mohammed as the head of state. The Supreme Military Council was formally dissolved when Ọbasanjọ handed power to the elected Shehu Shagari in 1979, ending the military regime and establishing a Nigerian Second Republic.

The Second Republic was overthrown in the 1983 Nigerian coup d'état and was succeeded by Muhammadu Buhari, who established a new Supreme Military Council of Nigeria as Head of State and Commander-in-Chief of the Armed Forces. Buhari ruled for two years, until the 1985 Nigerian coup d'état, when he was overthrown by General Ibrahim Babangida.

General Ibrahim Babangida was promulgated as the President and Commander-in-Chief of the Armed Forces and established the Armed Forces Ruling Council. His rule was the second longest serving military dictatorship. Babangida promised a return of democracy when he seized power, but later ruled Nigeria for eight years, when he temporarily handed power to an interim head of state, Ernest Shonekan, in August 1993.

In 1993, General Sani Abacha overthrew the Interim National Government and appointed himself Chairman of the Provisional Ruling Council of Nigeria.

== Transition to democracy ==
After Abacha's death in 1998, General Abdulsalami Abubakar took over and ruled until Olusẹgun Ọbasanjọ again assumed power as a democratically elected president (via the 1999 presidential election), ending the junta and establishing the Fourth Nigerian Republic.

== See also ==
- Nigerian First Republic
- Nigerian Second Republic
- Nigerian Third Republic
- Nigerian Fourth Republic
- Politics of Nigeria
