= National Security Council (Nigeria) =

Nigerian government advisory body

The National Security Council is an advisory body to the President of Nigeria dealing with matters of national security. Meetings of members of the NSC are held in State House, Abuja, at the Council Chambers. It was created in 1976 by the military regime of General Olusegun Obasanjo, after the failed coup by Buka Suka Dimka. The NSC, alongside the National Defence Council, are the two security advisory bodies in Nigeria.

== Membership ==
=== Permanent Members ===
- President of Nigeria (NSC General Chairman)
- Vice President of Nigeria (NSC Vice Chairman)
- Secretary to the Government of the Federation
- Chief of Staff to the President
- National Security Adviser
- Defence Minister
- Chief of the Defence Staff
- Chief of the Army Staff
- Chief of the Naval Staff
- Chief of the Air Staff
- Chief of Defence Intelligence
- Minister of Foreign Affairs
- Minister of the Interior
- Minister of Police Affairs
- Attorney-General and Minister of Justice
- Inspector General of the Nigeria Police Force
- Director-General of the Department of State Services
- Director-General of the National Intelligence Agency

=== Observer-Status Members ===
- President of the Senate of Nigeria
- Speaker of the House of Representatives of Nigeria
