= 1999 Nigerian presidential election =

- 27 February 1999
- Registered: 57,938,945
- Turnout: 52.26%
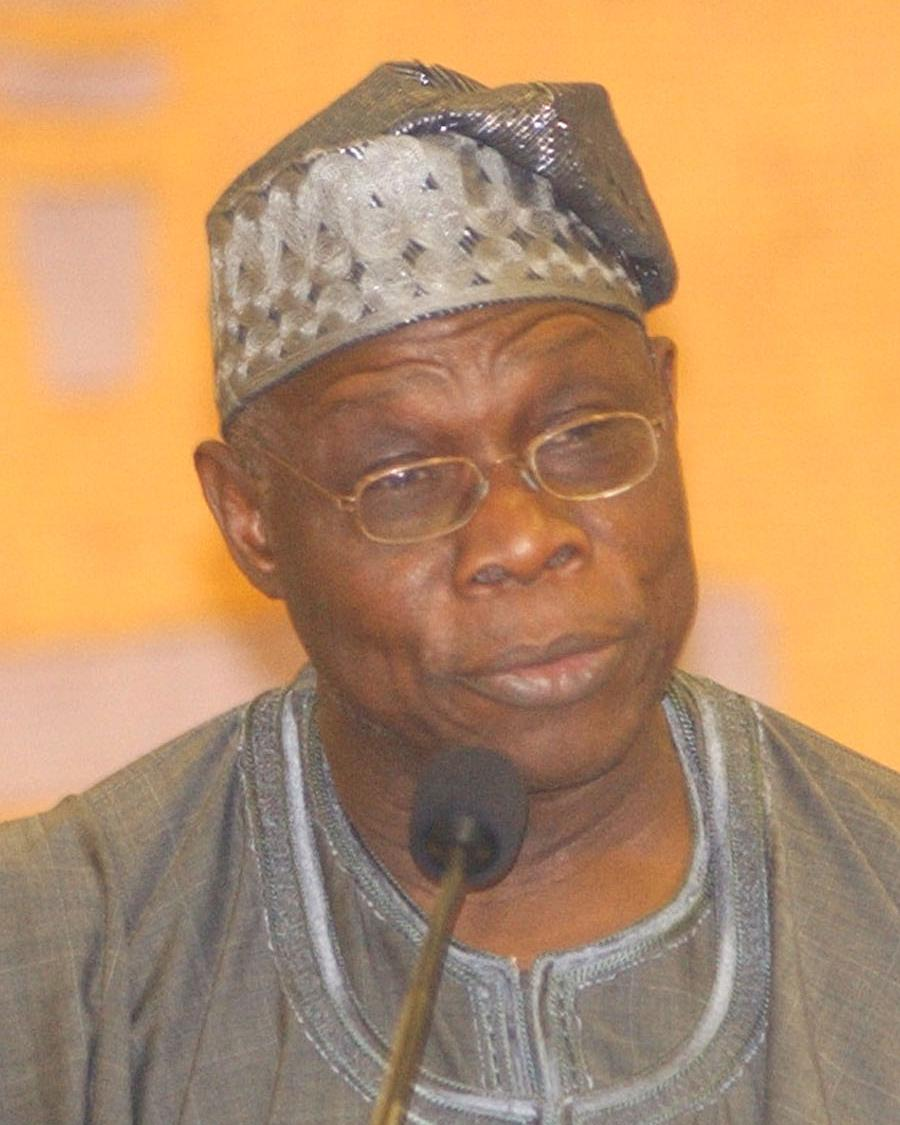

Nominee	Olusegun Obasanjo	Olu Falae
Party	PDP	AD–APP
Running mate	Atiku Abubakar	Umaru Shinkafi
States carried	27 + FCT	9
Popular vote	18,738,154	11,110,287
Percentage	62.78%	37.22%
- Results by state
President before election
Abdulsalami Abubakar
Military
Elected President
Olusegun Obasanjo
PDP

Presidential elections were held in Nigeria on 27 February 1999. They were the first elections to be held since the 1993 military coup and were the first elections of the Fourth Nigerian Republic. A former military head of state from 1976 to 1979, Olusegun Obasanjo, was elected president. Supported by the Peoples Democratic Party (PDP), he defeated Olu Falae who was backed by the Alliance for Democracy (AD) and All People's Party (APP). In 2025, Falae spoke up and claimed that "I won that election" instead of Obasanjo. He also claimed that his campaign didn't go to court as they were more concerned about the return to democracy after years of military rule.

Until 2023, this was the last election to not feature Muhammadu Buhari.

== Results ==
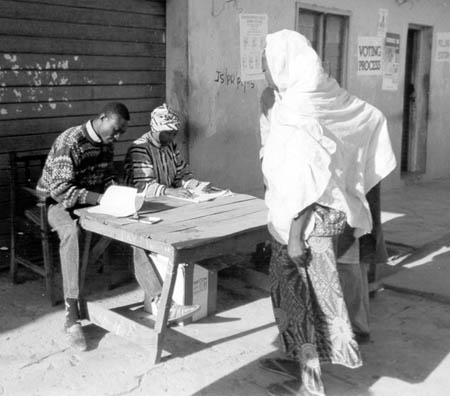
Voting during the 1999 presidential election in Nigeria

Candidate	Party	Votes	%
Olusegun Obasanjo	People's Democratic Party	18,738,154	62.78
Olu Falae	AD–APP	11,110,287	37.22
Total		29,848,441	100.00
Valid votes		29,848,441	98.57
Invalid/blank votes		431,611	1.43
Total votes		30,280,052	100.00
Registered voters/turnout		57,938,945	52.26
Source: African Elections Database

=== By state ===
State	Obasanjo		Falae		Total
State	Votes	%	Votes	%	Total
Abia	360,823	67.33	175,095	32.67	535,918
Adamawa	667,239	78.95	177,868	21.05	845,107
Akwa Ibom	730,744	82.73	152,534	17.27	883,278
Anambra	633,717	76.06	199,461	23.94	833,178
Bauchi	834,308	70.91	342,233	29.09	1,176,541
Bayelsa	457,812	75.05	152,220	24.95	610,032
Benue	983,912	78.53	269,045	21.47	1,252,957
Borno	581,382	63.47	334,593	36.53	915,975
Cross River	592,688	67.65	283,468	32.35	876,156
Delta	576,230	70.57	240,344	29.43	816,574
Ebonyi	250,987	72.56	94,934	27.44	345,921
Edo	516,581	75.99	163,203	24.01	679,784
Ekiti	191,618	26.85	522,072	73.15	713,690
Enugu	640,418	76.64	195,168	23.36	835,586
FCT	59,234	59.82	39,788	40.18	99,022
Gombe	533,158	63.13	311,381	36.87	844,539
Imo	421,767	57.30	314,339	42.70	736,106
Jigawa	311,571	56.79	237,025	43.21	548,596
Kaduna	1,294,679	77.25	381,350	22.75	1,676,029
Kano	682,255	75.41	222,458	24.59	904,713
Katsina	964,216	80.80	229,181	19.20	1,193,397
Kebbi	339,893	66.36	172,336	33.64	512,229
Kogi	507,903	51.58	476,807	48.42	984,710
Kwara	470,510	71.33	189,088	28.67	659,598
Lagos	209,012	11.93	1,542,969	88.07	1,751,981
Nasarawa	423,731	70.98	173,277	29.02	597,008
Niger	730,665	83.88	140,465	16.12	871,130
Ogun	143,564	30.17	332,340	69.83	475,904
Ondo	133,323	16.63	668,474	83.37	801,797
Osun	187,011	23.53	607,628	76.47	794,639
Oyo	227,668	24.71	693,510	75.29	921,178
Plateau	499,072	74.22	173,370	25.78	672,442
Rivers	1,352,275	86.37	213,328	13.63	1,565,603
Sokoto	155,598	43.90	198,829	56.10	354,427
Taraba	789,749	90.67	81,290	9.33	871,039
Yobe	146,517	47.02	165,061	52.98	311,578
Zamfara	136,324	35.87	243,755	64.13	380,079
Total	18,738,154	62.78	11,110,287	37.22	29,848,441
Source: Observing the 1998–99 Nigeria Elections (p. 54)

== Aftermath ==
After Obasanjo was declared winner,On May 29, 1999, military leader General Abdulsalami Abubakar officially handed over power to President Olusegun Obasanjo, ending 16 years of military rule.And the Nigeria 1999 constitutions is written.
