= President of Nigeria =

Head of state and government

President of the Federal Republic of Nigeria
- Seal of the president

- Presidential flag

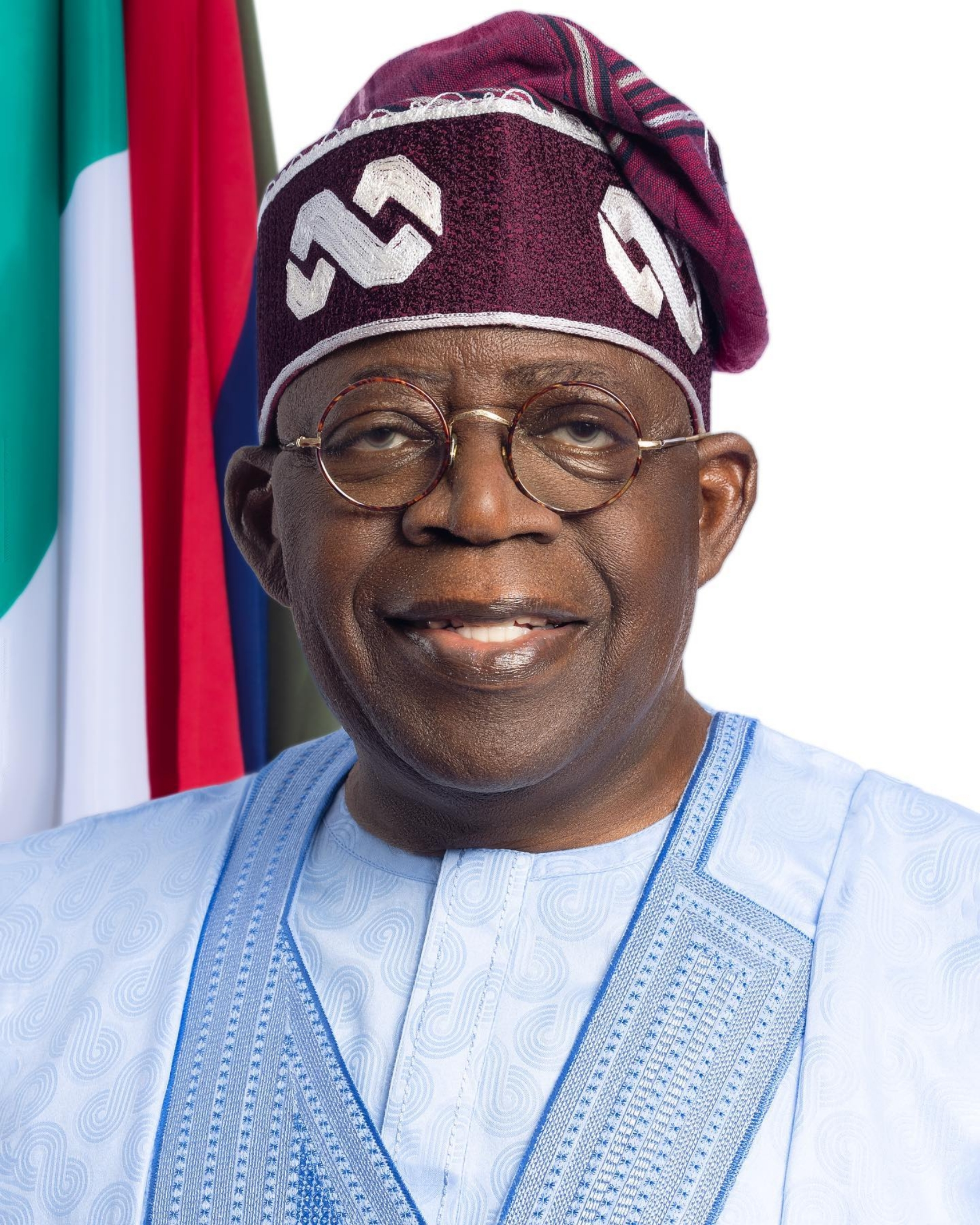
- Incumbent; Bola Ahmed Tinubu since 29 May 2023
- Executive Branch of the Federal Government; Office of the President
- Style: Mr. President; His Excellency
- Type: Head of state; Head of government; Commander-in-chief
- Abbreviation: POFRON
- Member of: Federal Executive Council; Council of State; National Security Council; National Defence Council; Nigeria Police Council
- Residence: Aso Rock Presidential Villa
- Seat: Abuja, F.C.T.
- Appointer: Direct popular election or via succession from vice presidency
- Term length: Four years, renewable once
- Constituting instrument: Constitution of Nigeria
- Formation: 1 October 1963 (63 years ago)
- First holder: Nnamdi Azikiwe
- Deputy: Vice President
- Salary: ₦500,000,000/US$ 310,774 annually
- Website: www.statehouse.gov.ng

Former standard of the president

The president of Nigeria, officially the president of the Federal Republic of Nigeria, is the head of state and head of government of the Federal Republic of Nigeria. The president directs the executive branch of the Federal Government and is the commander-in-chief of the Nigerian Armed Forces.

The offices, powers, and titles of the head of state and the head of government were officially merged into the office of the presidency under the 1979 Constitution of Nigeria.

Executive power is vested in the president. The power includes the execution and enforcement of federal law and the responsibility to appoint federal executive, diplomatic, regulatory, and judicial officers. Based on constitutional provisions empowering the president to appoint and receive ambassadors and conclude treaties with foreign powers, and on subsequent laws enacted by the House, the presidency has primary responsibility for conducting foreign policy.

The president also plays a leading role in federal legislation and domestic policymaking. As part of the system of separation of powers, the Constitution gives the president the power to sign or veto federal legislation. Presidents are typically viewed as leaders of their political parties, major policy making is significantly shaped by the outcome of presidential elections. The president is directly elected in national elections to a four-year term, along with the vice president.

Bola Tinubu is the 16th and current president of Nigeria, having assumed office on 29 May 2023.

== History ==
=== Ceremonial presidency and the First Republic (1963–1966) ===
On 1 October 1960, Nigeria gained independence from Britain. An all-Nigerian Executive Council was headed by the prime minister, Alhaji Sir Abubakar Tafawa Balewa. On 16 November 1960, Nnamdi Azikiwe became the first governor-general of a federation of three regions of the north, east and west, with Lagos as the Federal Capital. Each of the regions was headed by a premier with a governor as ceremonial head. The governors and governor-general represented the queen of Nigeria, Elizabeth II. On 1 October 1963, Nigeria became a federal republic thereby abolishing its monarchy, but remained a member of the Commonwealth of Nations. An amendment to the 1960 Independence Constitution replaced the office of the governor-general with that of the president. Nnamdi Azikwe was sworn into that office on 1 October 1963. The office at that time was primarily ceremonial, and the main duties of the president mainly concerned receiving foreign dignitaries and opening Parliament.

=== Military rule (1966–1979) ===
In a January 1966 failed coup d'état, a group of army officers, led by Major Chukwuma Nzeogwu, overthrew the federal and regional governments, killed the prime minister Abubakar Tafawa Balewa, and tried to take control of the government. Nzeogwu was countered, captured, and imprisoned by the Army general officer commanding Major General Johnson Aguiyi-Ironsi. Aguiyi-Ironsi was named Military Head of State.

In July 1966, a group of northern army officers revolted against the government, killed General Johnson Aguiyi-Ironsi, and appointed the army chief of staff, Lieutenant Colonel Yakubu Gowon as the head of the new military government.

In 1975, General Yakubu Gowon was deposed and Brigadier Murtala Mohammed was made head of the Federal Military Government of Nigeria until his assassination in 1976. Upon his death, the chief-of-staff, Supreme Headquarters (equivalent to a vice president) General Olusegun Obasanjo assumed office as head of state in a meeting of the Supreme Military Council, keeping the chain of command established by General Murtala Muhammed in place. General Obasanjo was responsible for completing the democratic transition begun by his predecessor, which culminated in an election in August 1979.

In 1979, Nigeria adopted a federal presidential constitution. The presidency became an executive post, with powers similar to those of its American counterpart. The legislature was a bicameral National Assembly, comprising a Senate and House of Representatives.

=== Second Republic (1979–1983) ===
On 1 October 1979, after more than 13 years of military rule, Nigeria returned to democratic rule. The National Party of Nigeria emerged victorious in the presidential election and Shehu Shagari became the first democratically elected president.

=== Military rule (1983–1999) ===
On 31 December 1983, the military overthrew the Second Republic. Major General Muhammadu Buhari emerged as the chairman of the Supreme Military Council (SMC), the new head of state.

In August 1985, General Buhari's government was peacefully overthrown by the Army chief of staff, Major General Ibrahim Babangida. Babangida became the president and chairman of the Armed Forces Ruling Council.

On 26 August 1993, General Babangida stepped down and chose an interim government to replace him. Ernest Shonekan was named as interim head of state. General Sani Abacha seized power from Shonekan on 17 November 1993, and became head of state and chairman of the Provisional Ruling Council.

On 8 June 1998, General Abacha died at the presidential villa in the Nigerian capital, Abuja. Major General Abdulsalami Abubakar became the new head of state and chairman of the Provisional Ruling Council.

=== Fourth Republic (1999–present) ===
On 29 May 1999, General Abdulsalami Abubakar stepped down, and handed over power to a former military head of state, Olusegun Obasanjo, after being elected some months prior. Obasanjo served two terms in office.

On 29 May 2007, Umaru Musa Yar'Adua was sworn in as president of the Federal Republic of Nigeria and the 13th head of state completing the first successful transition of power, from one democratically elected president to another in Nigeria. Yar'Adua died on 5 May 2010 at the presidential villa, in Abuja, Nigeria, becoming the second head of state to die there after General Sani Abacha.

On 6 May 2010, Vice President Goodluck Jonathan was sworn in as president of the Federal Republic of Nigeria and the 14th head of state.

On 29 May 2015, Muhammadu Buhari, a former military head of state was sworn in as president of the Federal Republic of Nigeria and the 15th head of state after winning the general election. He also served two terms in office.

On 29 May 2023, Bola Tinubu was sworn in as president of the Federal Republic of Nigeria and the 16th head of state after winning the 2023 Nigerian general election.

== Selection process ==
=== Electoral system ===
The president of Nigeria is elected using a modified two-round system with up to three rounds. To be elected in the first round, a candidate must receive a plurality of the votes, as well as over 25% of the vote in at least 24 of the 36 states and the Federal Capital Territory. If no candidate passes this threshold, a second round will be held between the top candidate and the next candidate to have received a majority of votes in the highest number of states. In the second round, a candidate still must receive the most votes, as well as over 25% of the vote in at least 24 of the 36 states and the Federal Capital Territory in order to be elected. If neither candidate passes this threshold, a third round will be held, where a simple majority of the votes is required to be elected.

Presidential candidates run for office with a running mate, their party's candidate for vice president.

=== Eligibility ===
Chapter VI, Part I, Section 131 of the constitution states that a person may be qualified for election of the office of the president if:

- They are a citizen of Nigeria by birth;
- They have attained the age of 35 years (40 before 2018);
- They are a member of a political party and are sponsored by that political party;
- They have been educated up to at least School Certificate level or its equivalent.

A person who meets the above qualifications is still disqualified from holding the office of the president if:

- They have voluntarily acquired the citizenship of a country other than Nigeria (except in such cases as may be prescribed by the National Assembly) or they have made a declaration of allegiance to such other country;
- They have been elected to such office at any two previous elections;
- Under the law in any part of Nigeria, they are adjudged to be a lunatic or otherwise declared to be of unsound mind;
- They are under a sentence of death imposed by any competent court of law or tribunal in Nigeria or a sentence of imprisonment or fine for any offence involving dishonesty or fraud or for any other offence, imposed on them by any court or tribunal or substituted by a competent authority for any other sentence imposed on them by such a court or tribunal;
- Within a period of less than ten years before the date of the election to the office of President they have been convicted and sentenced for an offence involving dishonesty or they have been found guilty of the contravention of the Code of Conduct;
- They are an undischarged bankrupt, having been adjudged or otherwise declared bankrupt under any law in force in Nigeria or any other country;
- Being a person employed in the civil or public service of the Federation or of any State, they have not resigned, withdrawn or retired from the employment at least thirty days before the date of the election; or
- They are a member of any secret society;
- They have been indicted for embezzlement or fraud by a Judicial Commission of Inquiry or an Administrative Panel of Inquiry or a Tribunal set up under the Tribunals of Inquiry Act, a Tribunals of Inquiry law or any other law by the federal or state government which indictment has been accepted by the federal or state government, respectively;
- They have presented a forged certificate to the Independent National Electoral Commission.

=== Inauguration ===
==== Oath of office ====
The Constitution of Nigeria specifies an oath of office for the president of the federation. The oath is administered by the chief justice of the Supreme Court of Nigeria or the person for the time being appointed to exercise the functions of that office:

I do solemnly swear/affirm that I will be faithful and bear true allegiance to the Federal Republic of Nigeria; that as President of the Federal Republic of Nigeria, I will discharge my duties to the best of my ability, faithfully and in accordance with the Constitution of the Federal Republic of Nigeria and the law, and always in the interest of the sovereignty, integrity, solidarity, well-being and prosperity of the Federal Republic of Nigeria; that I will strive to preserve the Fundamental Objectives and Directive Principles of State Policy contained in the Constitution of the Federal Republic of Nigeria; that I will not allow my personal interest to influence my official conduct or my official decisions; that I will to the best of my ability preserve, protect and defend the Constitution of the Federal Republic of Nigeria; that I will abide by the Code of Conduct contained in the Fifth Schedule to the Constitution of the Federal Republic of Nigeria; that in all circumstances, I will do right to all manner of people, according to law, without fear or favour, affection or ill-will; that I will not directly or indirectly communicate or reveal to any person any matter which shall be brought under my consideration or shall become known to me as President of the Federal Republic of Nigeria, except as may be required for the due discharge of my duties as President; and that I will devote myself to the service and well-being of the people of Nigeria. So help me God.

== Related constitutional organs ==
The president is assisted by the staff of the Office of the President. Additionally, it relies on several constitutional organs, one of which included the National Security Council, which provided advice concerning the foreign, military, and domestic policies bearing on national security. Other organs include the National Defence Council, the Council of State, Federal Executive Council, and the Nigeria Police Council.

== Powers ==
=== Administrative powers ===
Presidents make political appointments. Some appointments must be confirmed by the Senate. The following is a list of presidential appointments:

- Secretary to the Government of the Federation
- Members of Federal Executive Council
- The High Command of the Armed Forces
  - Chief of Defence Staff
  - Chief of Army Staff
  - Chief of the Air Staff
  - Chief of the Naval Staff
- Inspector General of Police
- Heads of other paramilitary and security agencies
- Chief of Staff to the President
- Presidential aides
- Presidential press secretary
- Heads of Federal Departments and Agencies
- Heads of diplomatic missions of Nigeria

The president also possesses the power to manage operations of the federal government by issuing various types of directives.

=== Commander-in-chief ===
The Flag of the Commander-in-Chief of the Armed Forces.

The president of Nigeria bears ultimate authority over the Nigerian Armed Forces as its commander-in-chief, in which the president issues military directives, makes defence policy and appoints the high command like the Chief of Defence Staff. In addition, by precedent the President automatically is eligible to wear the military uniform of a field Marshal.

=== Foreign policy ===
The president determines the foreign relations of Nigeria, and represents the state in international relations, conducts negotiations and signs ratification documents. The president is empowered to appoint ambassadors.

=== Ceremonial duties ===
An important ceremonial role of the president is awarding state awards in line with the Nigerian honours system. The state awards presented by the president is the Order of the Federal Republic

== Incumbency ==
=== Term duration ===
There is a four year tenure with a two-term limit for the president in the Constitution of Nigeria. There was an attempt to modify the term limits in 2006 for Obasanjo, but it did not materialize.

=== Privileges ===
The president is an ex officio Grand Commander in the Order of the Federal Republic. As such, they receive the post-nominal letters of GCFR.

=== Residence ===
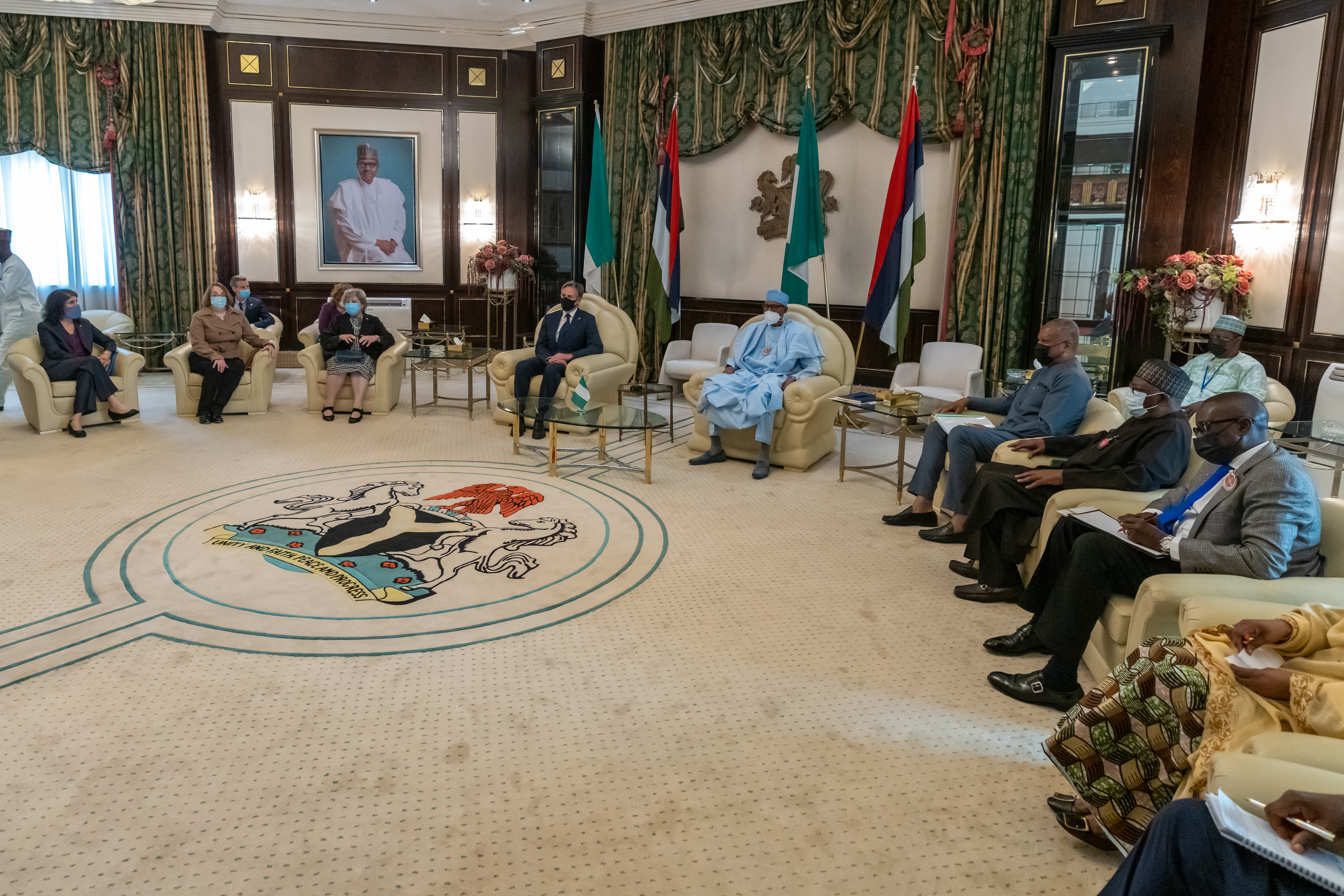
President Muhammadu Buhari meeting with United States Secretary of State Antony Blinken at Aso Rock in November 2021. Notice the Flag of the Commander-in-Chief of the Armed Forces is present and positioned to the right of the Flag of Nigeria.

The president of Nigeria lives and works in the Aso Rock Presidential Villa, officially known as The State House. The palatial residence was completed in 1991, the same year the military junta of Ibrahim Babangida relocated the national capital from Lagos to Abuja. Before Aso Rock, Dodan Barracks served as the official residence of the military heads of state and the seat of the Supreme Military Headquarters from 1966-1991. During Azikwe's time as president, his official residence was the State House, Marina in Lagos.

=== Transport ===
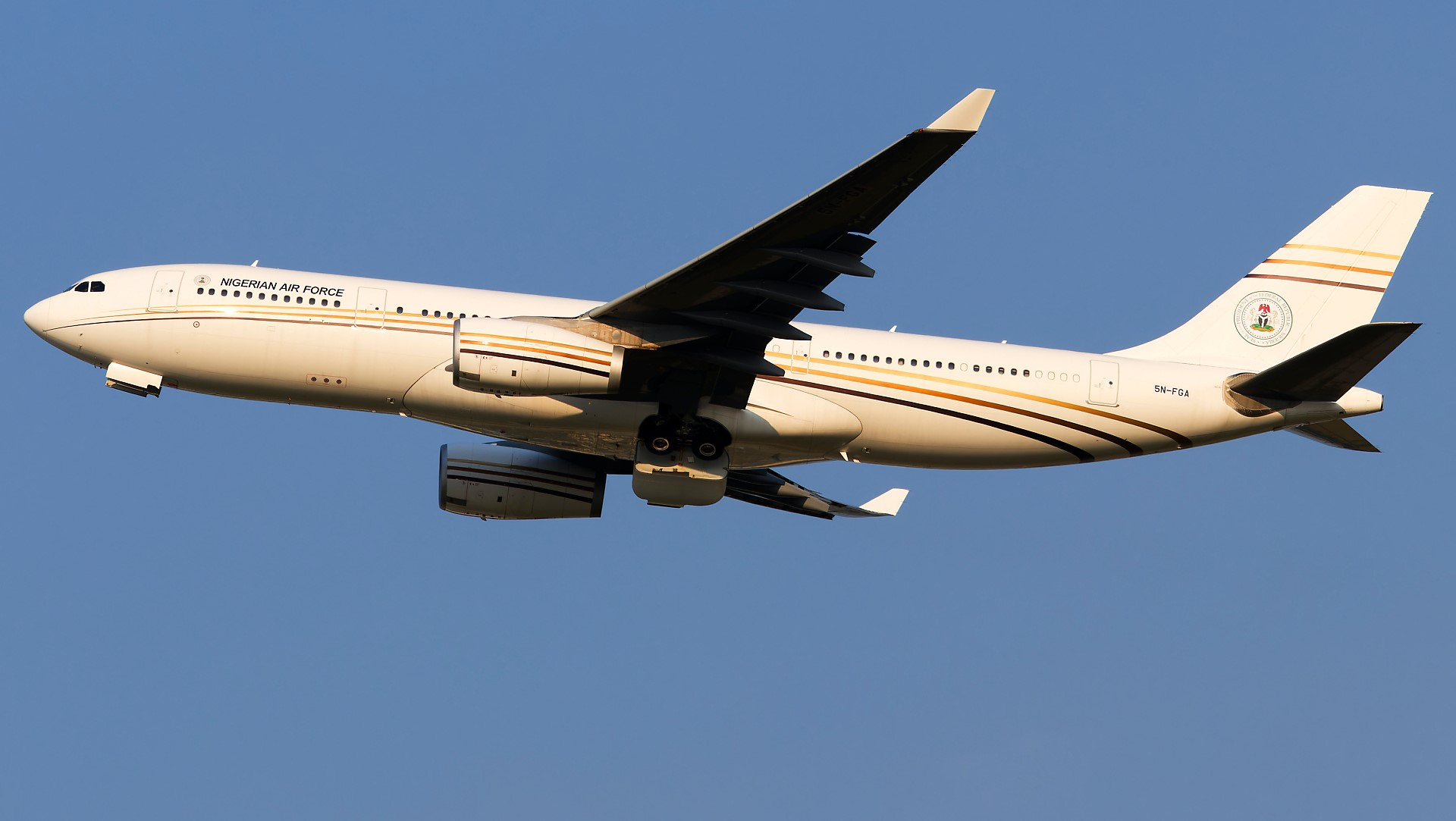
Nigerian Presidential Jet Airbus A330-243 (NAF-001)

The Nigerian Air Force provides for the aerial transport of the president. As at 2024, the presidential air fleet consists of:

a. A Boeing Business Jet (BBJ 737)

b. A Dassault Falcon 7X Jet

c. Two Gulfstream Jets (500 and 550)

d. Two AW-189 helicopters

e. Two AW-139 helicopters

F. Airbus A330

== Line of succession ==
The office of vice president was established by the 1979 constitution for the purpose of providing a succession in case the president is unable to complete their term via death, resignation, or removal from office. The constitution entitles the vice president to exercise the duties of the president, both in the case of a temporary absence and in the case of a permanent absence. In the absence of both the president and the vice president, the Nigerian presidential line of succession provides that the executive power must be temporarily exercised by the President of the Senate of Nigeria.

== Removal ==
The removal of the President is governed by Section 143 of the 1999 Constitution of Nigeria. The sole ground for removal is "gross misconduct", and the process strictly requires a two-thirds majority of the National Assembly. The constitutional procedure unfolds as follows:

- A written notice alleging gross misconduct, signed by at least one-third of all National Assembly members, must be presented to the Senate President.
- The Senate President serves the notice to the President and all lawmakers within seven days. The President has the right to issue a written reply.
- Within 14 days, both houses of the National Assembly resolve by motion whether to investigate the allegations. This motion passes only if supported by a two-thirds majority of all members in both houses.
- If the motion passes, the Chief Justice of Nigeria appoints a seven-person panel of unquestionable integrity to investigate the allegations.
- If the report finds the President guilty, the National Assembly debates it and if a two-thirds majority vote to adopt the report, the President is removed from office.

== Post-presidency ==
The following privileges are guaranteed to former presidents by law:

- A monthly upkeep allowance of 350,000 Nigerian naira, totaling about 4.2 million annually.
- They are entitled to a well-furnished 5-bedroom house in any location of their choice within Nigeria.
- A modestly furnished office space of their choice
- Three vehicles that are replaced every four years.
- 30 days of annual paid vacation
- A diplomatic passport for life
- Free medical treatment within and outside Nigeria for the former president and their immediate family.
- Provision of three to four armed policemen and a DSS officer as an aide-de-camp.

== See also ==
- List of governors and governors-general of Nigeria
- List of presidents of Nigeria
- Nigerian presidential inauguration
- Prime Minister of Nigeria
- List of Nigerian heads of state by age
