= Three Arms Zone =

Area in Abuja, Nigeria

The Three Arms Zone is a district of Abuja, the capital of Nigeria, so named because it contains the headquarters of the Three Arms of Government. The Supreme Court (Judiciary), The National Assembly (Legislature), and the Presidential Villa (Executive) as well as several federal buildings.
