= Babafemi Ogundipe =

De facto deputy head of state of Nigeria in 1966

Brigadier Babafemi Ogundipe

Nigerian High Commissioner to the United Kingdom
- In office 1966–1970
- Head of State: Yakubu Gowon

1st Chief of Staff, Supreme Headquarters
- In office 16 January 1966 – 29 July 1966
- Head of State: Johnson Aguiyi-Ironsi
- Preceded by: Position established
- Succeeded by: J. E. A. Wey

Personal details
- Born: 6 September 1924 Ago-Iwoye, Southern Region, British Nigeria (now Ago-Iwoye, Ogun State, Nigeria)
- Died: 20 November 1971 (aged 47) London, United Kingdom
- Party: None (military)
- Spouse: Elizabeth Omowunmi Phelan

Military service
- Allegiance: British Empire; Nigeria
- Branch/service: Nigerian Army
- Years of service: 1942–1966
- Rank: Brigadier
- Battles/wars: World War II • Burma campaign Congo Crisis

Babafemi Olatunde Ogundipe (6 September 1924 – 20 November 1971) was the de facto second-in-command and first Chief of Staff, Supreme Headquarters from January 1966 to August 1966 during Major General Johnson Aguiyi-Ironsi's military regime. He was Nigerian High Commissioner to the United Kingdom from September 1966 to August 1970 during General Yakubu Gowon's military regime.

== Early life ==
He was born on 6 September 1924 to Yoruba parents from Ago-Iwoye, in present-day Ogun State in western Nigeria.

== Military career ==
He joined the Royal West African Frontier Force in 1941, serving in Burma between 1942 and 1945. He re-enlisted in the West Africa Forces and received a short service commission as a second lieutenant in August 1953. In December 1956, he was commissioned into the regular army as a lieutenant, with seniority from 21 January 1952. He was appointed Captain, with seniority from January 1955, in December 1956. On 1 October 1960, along with the majority of Nigerian officers in the Royal Nigerian Military Forces, he relinquished his commission upon being appointed to a commission in the Royal Nigeria Army. He rose to the rank of Brigadier in the Nigerian Army (which had ceased to be known as the Royal Nigerian Army upon Nigeria becoming a republic on 1 October 1963) in May 1964.

He served a number of tours during the Congo Crisis, as part of the Nigerian Army's contingent to the United Nations peace keeping force - ONUC - between 1960 and 1963, including as the Commander ONUC, Kasai and Kbngolo Sector and Commander of the Nigerian Contingent, and as ONUC Chief of Staff. At the end of his service in the Congo, he returned to Nigeria as the commander of the second brigade of the Nigerian Army in Lagos, where he remained until September 1964, when he left to attend the Imperial Defence College (now the Royal College of Defence Studies) in London. At the end of his course at the IDC, he remained in London as the Military Attaché at the Nigerian High Commission, where he was posted at the time of the January coup d'état in Nigeria.

=== Chief of Staff, Supreme Headquarters ===
Following the coup, he returned to Nigeria, to serve as the Chief of Staff, Supreme Headquarters Nigerian Defence Forces (de facto Vice President) between January 1966 and August 1966. After the bloody coup which overthrew Aguiyi-Ironsi, he left the country for the United Kingdom. He was criticized in some quarters for his refusal to seize the mantle of office of his supreme commander, who had been murdered in the August 1966 coup, and that this aggravated the pogroms that eventually followed. He was the most senior military officer after the death of Aguiyi-Ironsi, and the thinking was that he ought to have taken power himself.

The fact is that this was not a viable thing for him to have done. He had no troops, and he was unable to rely on the few individuals available to him, many of whom were northern and were unwilling to take orders from a Christian southerner. Furthermore, he was basically a soldier and had no personal political ambitions. He understood that the preservation of Nigeria as one country meant that a southern Christian would be unable to hold the country together, and he took himself out of the power equation by accepting Yakubu Gowon (several years his junior) as the head of the new military government.

== High Commissioner in London ==
Following an agreement with the new military government led by General Yakubu Gowon, he left the country for the United Kingdom, where he attended the 1966 Commonwealth Heads of Government Meeting as Nigeria's representative in September.

Thereafter he took up appointment in London as Nigeria's High Commissioner to the United Kingdom, a post he held for four years where he played an instrumental role in securing British materiel support for the Nigerian Civil War. He left public service in August 1970.

== Death ==
He died from a heart attack in London on 20 November 1971.

== See also ==
- Nigerian First Republic
- Nigerian Civil War
