= Ernest Shonekan =

Interim President of Nigeria in 1993

Chief Ernest Shonekan GCFR
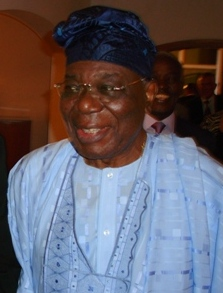
- Shonekan in 2009

9th Interim Head of State of Nigeria
- Interim; 26 August 1993 – 17 November 1993
- Vice President: Sani Abacha (as vice chairman of the ING, Minister of Defense, and Senior Minister)
- Preceded by: Ibrahim Babangida as Military President of Nigeria
- Succeeded by: Sani Abacha as Military Head of State of Nigeria

Head of Government of Nigeria
- In office 2 January 1993 – 17 November 1993
- President: Ibrahim Babangida; Himself
- Vice President: Augustus Aikhomu
- Preceded by: Ibrahim Babangida
- Succeeded by: Sani Abacha

Personal details
- Born: 9 May 1936 Lagos, British Nigeria (now Lagos, Lagos State, Nigeria)
- Died: 11 January 2022 (aged 85) Lekki, Lagos State, Nigeria
- Party: Independent
- Spouse: Margaret Shonekan
- Education: University of London; Harvard Business School
- Profession: Lawyer; businessman

Chief Ernest Adegunle Oladeinde Shonekan GCFR (9 May 1936 – 11 January 2022) was a Nigerian lawyer and statesman who served as the interim head of state of Nigeria from 26 August 1993 to 17 November 1993. He was installed as the Abese of Egbaland in 1981.

Prior to his political career, Shonekan was the chairman and chief executive of the United African Company of Nigeria (successor of The Niger Company), a vast Nigerian conglomerate which at the time was the largest African-controlled company in Sub-Saharan Africa.

== Early life ==
Shonekan was born in Lagos on 9 May 1936. The son of an Abeokuta-born civil servant, he was one of six children born into the family.

Shonekan was educated at CMS Grammar School and Igbobi College. He received a law degree from the University of London, and was called to the bar. He later attended Harvard Business School.

== Early business career ==
Shonekan joined the United Africa Company of Nigeria in 1964, at the time a subsidiary of the United Africa Company which played a prominent role in British colonisation. He rose through the ranks in the company and was promoted to assistant legal adviser. He later became a deputy adviser and joined the board of directors at the age of 40. He was made chairman and managing director in 1980, and went on to cultivate a wide array of international business and political connections.

== Crisis of the Third Republic ==
On 2 January 1993, Shonekan assumed office simultaneously as head of transitional council and head of government under Ibrahim Babangida. At the time, the transitional council was designed to be the final phase leading to a scheduled hand over to an elected democratic leader of the Third Nigerian Republic.

Shonekan learned of the dire condition of government finances, which he was unable to correct. The government was hard pressed on international debt obligations and had to hold constant talks for debt rescheduling.

In August 1993, Babangida resigned from office, following the annulment of the 12 June elections. He signed a decree establishing the Interim National Government led by Shonekan who was subsequently sworn in as head of state.

== Interim government ==
Shonekan was unable to control the political crisis which ensued following the election annulment. During his few months in power, he tried to schedule another presidential election and a return to democratic rule, while his government was hampered by a national workers' strike. Opposition leader Moshood Abiola, viewed Shonekan's interim government as illegitimate. Shonekan released political prisoners detained by Babangida. Shonekan's administration introduced a bill to repeal three major draconian decrees of the military government. Babangida made the interim government weak by placing it under the control of the military.

Shonekan had lobbied for debt cancellation but, after the election annulment, most of the Western powers had imposed economic sanctions on Nigeria. Inflation was uncontrollable and most non-oil foreign investment disappeared. The government also initiated an audit of the accounts of NNPC, the oil giant, an organisation that had many operational inefficiencies. Shonekan served as an executive of Royal Dutch Shell while acting as the interim president of Nigeria.

Shonekan tried to set a timetable for troop withdrawal from ECOMOG's peacekeeping mission in Liberia. General Sani Abacha, was the minister of defence and chief of defence staff who had full control over the military.

Shonekan's government had to deal with the 1993 Nigerian Airways hijack.

== Out of office ==
On 18 November 1993, three months into his administration, Shonekan was overthrown in a palace coup by General Sani Abacha.

In 1993, along with other prominent Nigerians and expatriates, he founded the Nigerian Economic Summit Group, an advocacy and think-tank group for private sector-led development of the Nigerian economy.

== Personal life and death ==
Shonekan was married to Margaret Shonekan. He died on 11 January 2022, at the age of 85 at Evercare Hospital in Lagos. At the time of his death, he was the third oldest surviving Nigerian head of state by age after Elizabeth II and Yakubu Gowon.

== General references ==
- "Military swears in transitional government", Agence France Presse—English, 4 January 1993
- "Nigeria prepares medium-term plan", Financial Times (London, England), 28 January 1993
- "NIGERIA: HARD ROAD AHEAD FOR INTERIM GOVERNMENT", IPS-Inter Press Service, 26 August 1993

Political offices
Preceded by Ibrahim Babangida	Interim Head of State of Nigeria; 26 August 1993 – 17 November 1993	Succeeded by Sani Abacha
