= 1993 Nigerian coup d'état =

Military coup

Date	November 17, 1993
Location	Nigeria
Result	Coup succeeds.: Ernest Shonekan is forced to resign by Defence Minister Sani Abacha.

Belligerents
(Nigeria) Interim government	Armed Forces

Commanders and leaders
Ernest Shonekan	Sani Abacha

The 1993 Nigerian coup d'état was a bloodless military coup which took place in Nigeria on 17 November 1993 when the Armed Forces, headed by Defence Minister General Sani Abacha, forced Interim President Chief Ernest Shonekan to resign. Shonekan assumed the interim presidency on 26 August 1993, succeeding General Ibrahim Babangida as head of state, in the aftermath of Babangida's annulment of the 12 June 1993 presidential election. In a nationwide broadcast following the coup, Abacha cited the stagnant nature of Shonekan's government, and his inability to manage the democratic process in the country as a cause of his resignation. In September 1994, Abacha issued a decree that placed his government above the jurisdiction of the courts, effectively giving him absolute power. Another decree gave him the right to detain anyone for up to three months.

Abacha stayed in power until his death on 8 June 1998 at the presidential complex (Aso Villa) in Abuja. He was succeeded by the Chief of the Defence Staff Major General Abdulsalami Abubakar as head of state.
