= The State House (Aso Rock Villa) =

Official residence of the Nigerian president

Aso Rock Villa
- Interactive map of the Aso Rock Villa area

General information
- Architectural style: Neoclassical, Palladian
- Location: Yakubu Gowon Crescent, Asokoro, Abuja, Federal Capital Territory.
- Coordinates: 9°03′44″N 7°31′07″E
- Current tenants: Bola Ahmed Tinubu, President of the Federal Republic of Nigeria and the First Family.
- Construction started: 13 October 1989; 36 years ago
- Completed: 1 November 1991; 34 years ago
- Owner: Federal Government of Nigeria

Website
- www.statehouse.gov.ng

The State House (also known as Aso Rock Villa) is the workplace and official residence of the President of Nigeria since 1991, when Nigeria moved its capital from Lagos to Abuja. It is located at Yakubu Gowon Crescent, Asokoro District, Abuja in the Federal Capital Territory of Nigeria. The Aso Rock Villa hosts the offices of the President and Vice President and it is the seat of the Executive Arm of the Federal Government of Nigeria. The Aso Rock Villa is the most protected presidential state house in Africa. It is heavily protected by the Presidential Guards Brigade and the State Security Service.

== History ==
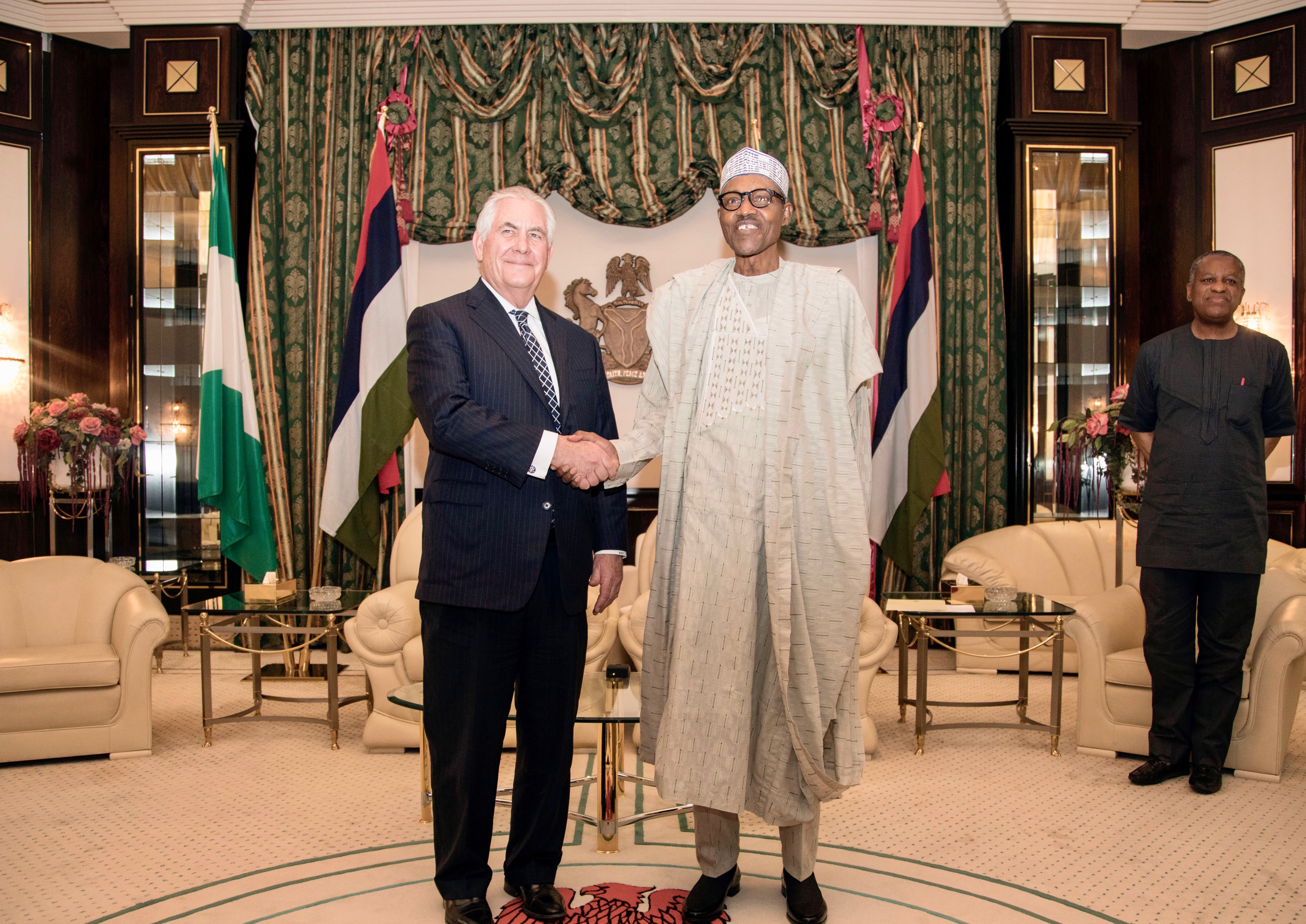
President Buhari meets with U.S. Secretary of State Rex Tillerson at the Presidential Villa, March 2018

The palatial residence was completed in 1991, the same year the military junta of Ibrahim Babangida relocated the national capital from Lagos to Abuja. Aso Villa encompasses the 400 meter monolith Aso Rock, located within the Three Arms Zone of Abuja metropolis. In 1976, the Military Government of Murtala Mohammed took the decision to relocate the Federal Capital from Lagos and set up a committee under the leadership of Justice Akinola Aguda which recommended the creation of a Federal Capital Territory (FCT) in the center of the country and a proclamation to this effect was issued on 3 February 1976.

Akinola Aguda House (formally named on 1 October 1983) was originally conceived as a Presidential Lodge & Guest House Complex and hosted the first ever formal Cabinet Meeting held outside Lagos, only days after Abuja hosted Nigeria's Independence Anniversary celebrations for the first time, in October 1982. President Ibrahim Babangida, who took office in 1985, commenced construction of a new presidential residence in 1989 and in 1991 the Aso Rock Presidential Villa was completed and President Babangida became the first Head of State to occupy it, on 12 December 1991. Upon completion of the Aso Rock Presidential Villa, the Aguda House became the Vice Presidential Complex, and has remained so till date apart from the period between 1999 and 2007 when the Vice President lived in a Residence that has since been transferred to the Judiciary as Official Quarters of the Chief Justice of Nigeria.

In 2010, construction of a new Vice Presidential Residence commenced. The new Residence of the Vice President was completed and commissioned in 2024. Today the Presidential Complex, located in the Asokoro District next to the Three Arms Zone of the Federal Capital Territory, consists of the Main Presidential Villa (Office and Residence of the President, and Offices of the Vice President and Wife of the President), the State House Conference Center, State House Annex State House Clinic, and the Akinola Aguda House. The old Presidential Lodge in Marina, Lagos, was handed over to the Lagos State Government in 2017.

== Demonym ==
The Aso Rock Villa is often used as a demonym to refer the Federal Government of Nigeria. However, the name which was inspired by the Aso Rock monolith, a nearby hill, has become a symbol of Nigeria's maturing democratic governance. Several names that are used for the Aso Villa include: The State House (common among Nigerian Media stations like the NTA and Channels Television), The Aso Rock (common among Nigerians), and The Villa (common among Nigerian politicians).

== Protection and security ==
The villa is currently under the protection of the Presidential Guard Brigade which perform ceremonial and protective duties for the president. The brigade performs public duties in a weekly changing of the guard ceremony outside the villa. The Villa is also protected by a squad of State Security Service Agents and a squadron of the Mobile Police Force assigned solely for the protection of the President, the Vice President and their respective families.
