= Constitution of Nigeria =

Federal Republic of Nigeria supreme law

Constitution of the Federal Republic of Nigeria
- Coat of arms of Nigeria

Overview
- Jurisdiction: Nigeria
- Ratified: 1999; 27 years ago
- Date effective: 1999; 27 years ago
- System: Federal Presidential Constitutional Republic

Government structure
- Branches: 3
- Chambers: Senate and House of Representatives
- Executive: President
- Judiciary: Supreme Court
- Federalism: Federal Republic of Nigeria

History
- Amendments: 2
- Last amended: January 2011
- Supersedes: 1993 Constitution of Nigeria

Full text
- Constitution of Nigeria at Wikisource

The constitution of Nigeria is the written supreme law of the Federal Republic of Nigeria. Nigeria has had many constitutions. Its current form was enacted on 29 May 1999 and kickstarted the Fourth Nigerian Republic. The constitution of Nigeria in the 2025 version does not fully support human rights; contrary to normal western constitutions, who state "all persons are equal", the Nigerian constitution restricts this to citizens only, stating "all citizens are equal".

== Background ==
Nigeria's structure and composition are a legacy of British colonial rule. It has over 374 multilingual groups with different cultures and traditions. This diversity contributes to Nigeria being "one of the world's most deeply divided countries" with rampant political corruption. As a result, Nigeria has undergone many attempts to form an effective constitution. These efforts include civilian and military rule, centrifugal and centralised federalism, presidential and parliamentary systems, and other political institutions.

An Order in Council enacted Nigeria's first constitutions during the colonial era when the country was administered as a Crown Colony. These constitutions include the Clifford Constitution of 1922, the Richards Constitution of 1946, the Macpherson Constitution of 1951, and the Lyttleton Constitution of 1954.

=== Richards constitution ===
Westminster approved a new constitution for Nigeria in 1946. It was called the Richards Constitution after Governor-General Sir Arthur Richards, who was responsible for its formulation. Although it left effective power in the hands of the Governor-General and his appointed Executive Council, it also established an expanded Legislative Council empowered to deliberate on matters affecting the country. It also created three regional Houses of Assembly to consider local questions and advise the lieutenant governors.

The Richards Constitution recognised the country's diversity by introducing the federal principle with its regional authority. Although realistic in its assessment of the situation in Nigeria, the Richards Constitution intensified regionalism instead of encouraging political unification. It was suspended in 1950 against a call for greater autonomy.

=== MacPherson constitution ===
An inter-parliamentary conference at Ibadan in 1950 drafted a new constitution. It was dubbed the Macpherson Constitution after the incumbent Governor-General John Stuart Macpherson. It went into effect the following year.

The MacPherson Constitution provided for regional autonomy and federal union, creating a central government with a Council of Ministers. This encouraged political participation and party activity at the national level. However, the regional governments had broad legislative powers that could not be overridden by the newly established 185-seat federal House of Representatives. As a result, the Macpherson Constitution significantly boosted regionalism.

=== Lyttleton constitution ===
The next revision of the constitution was called the Lyttleton Constitution, named after Oliver Lyttleton. This was drawn up after two constitutional conferences:

==== Nigerian Constitutional Conference, 1953 ====
This was attended by six delegates each from the three regions of Nigeria, plus one from the Cameroons

In 1954 the Federation of Nigeria was established on the principle of federalism. This paved the way for Nigeria's independence from Great Britain. Lyttleton constitution promoted regional sentiments among Nigerians as had previously been done by the Richard constitution.

=== 1960 independence constitution ===
A British Order-in-Council enacted Nigeria's first constitution as a sovereign state. It came into force upon the country's independence on 1 October 1960. Under this constitution, Nigeria retained Queen Elizabeth II as titular head of state, Queen of Nigeria. Nnamdi Azikiwe represented the queen as Governor-General.

=== 1963 constitution ===
Independent Nigeria's second constitution abolished the monarchy and established the First Nigerian Republic. It came into force on 1 October 1963, the third anniversary of Nigeria's independence. Nnamdi Azikiwe became the first President of Nigeria. The 1963 constitution was based on the Westminster system. It was used until a military coup in 1966 that overthrew Nigeria's democratic institutions.

=== 1979 constitution ===
The 1979 constitution established the Second Nigerian Republic. It abandoned the Westminster system in favour of a United States-style presidential system with direct elections. To avoid the pitfalls of the First Nigerian Republic, the 1979 constitution mandated political parties which were required to register in at least two-thirds of the states. In addition, it established a Cabinet of Nigeria, with each state having at least one member. This gave a "federal character" to the nation.

=== 1993 constitution ===
The 1993 constitution established the Third Nigerian Republic. This constitution was supposed to return democratic rule to Nigeria but it was never fully implemented. The military controlled the country until May 1999 when it handed over power to an elected president.

=== 1999 constitution ===
The 1999 constitution created the Fourth Nigerian Republic, a federation with democratic rule. It defines the national capital, 36 states and their capitals, and 774 local government areas within Nigeria. It establishes the legislative, executive, and judicial branches of government and details their duties and the separation of powers between the branches and federal and state governments. Nigeria's legislative powers are vested in a National Assembly with two chambers: a Senate and a House of Representatives. The constitution gives the National Assembly the power to make laws for "peace, order and good government of the Federation".

The constitution outlines the individual's fundamental rights, including life, liberty, dignity, privacy, freedom of expression, religious freedom, and security from slavery, violence, discrimination, and forced service in the military. It also defines a person's right to a timely and fair trial if arrested and the presumption of innocence. Nigerians also have the right to own "immovable property anywhere in Nigeria", a right of assembly, and freedom of movement.

The constitution also protects four laws: the Land Use Act, the National Securities Agencies Act, the National Youth Service legislation, and the Public Complaints Commission Act. In January 2011, President Goodluck Jonathan signed three amendments to the constitution, the first modifications since it came into use in 1999. In 2017 and 2023, further amendments were made.

== See also ==
- Military dictatorship in Nigeria – 1966–1979 and 1983–1999
