= Inauguration of Umaru Musa Yar'Adua =

5th Nigerian presidential inauguration

Presidential inauguration of Umaru Musa Yar'Adua
- Date: 29 May 2007; 19 years ago
- Location: Eagle Square, Abuja, F.C.T.
- Participants: Umaru Musa Yar'Adua; 13th president of Nigeria — Assuming office Idris Legbo Kutigi; Chief Justice of Nigeria — Administering oath Goodluck Jonathan; 12th vice president of Nigeria — Assuming office Idris Legbo Kutigi; Chief Justice of Nigeria — Administering oath

The inauguration of Umaru Musa Yar'Adua as the 13th president of Nigeria, and 2nd in the fourth republic was held on Tuesday, 29 May 2007, marking the commencement of Umaru Musa Yar'Adua's and Goodluck Jonathan's only term as president and vice president. It was the 5th presidential inauguration in Nigeria, the 3rd in the fourth republic and the first successful transition of power, from one democratically elected leader to another in Nigeria. Yar'Adua died 2 years, 341 days into this term, and Jonathan succeeded to the presidency.

Yar'Adua was sworn in after winning the controversial 2007 Nigerian presidential election, an election which was widely described as fraudulent.

== Swearing-in-Ceremony ==
The official swearing-in ceremony took place at Eagle Square in Abuja, the Federal Capital Territory. Chief Justice Idris Legbo Kutigi administered the oath of office taken by President Yar'Adua and Vice President Goodluck Jonathan.

== Attendance ==
Former Nigerian heads of state General Yakubu Gowon, President Shehu Shagari, General Ibrahim Babangida, Interim President Ernest Shonekan and General Abdulsalami Abubakar were in attendance.

Former military head of state, General Muhammadu Buhari who was the ANPP candidate in the election was absent from the ceremony, after he had challenged the result.

The ceremony was attended by many world and African leaders and dignitaries, many Nigerians purposely avoided it.

== See also ==
- 2007 Nigerian general election
- First inauguration of Goodluck Jonathan
- Inauguration of Bola Tinubu
