= Dahiru Musdapher =

Chief Justice of Nigeria from 2011 to 2012

Dahiru Musdapher GCON CFR
- A portrait of Justice Musdapher

12th Chief Justice of Nigeria
- In office 2011–2012
- President: Goodluck Jonathan
- Preceded by: Aloysius Iyorgyer Katsina-Alu
- Succeeded by: Aloma Mariam Mukhtar

Justice of the Supreme Court of Nigeria
- In office 2003–2012

Justice of the Nigerian Court of Appeal
- In office 1985–2003

Chief Judge of Kano State
- In office 1979–1985

Attorney General of Kaduna State
- In office 1976–1979

Personal details
- Born: Dahiru Babura Musdapher; 15 July 1942 Babura, Northern Region, British Nigeria
- Died: 22 January 2018 (aged 75) London, United Kingdom
- Spouse: Sabwa Dahiru Musdapher

Dahiru Babura Musdapher GCON CFR (15 July 1942 – 22 January 2018) was a Nigerian jurist who served as the 12th chief justice of Nigeria from 2011 to 2012. He served as the attorney-general and commissioner of justice of Kaduna State from 1976 to 1979, and as the chief judge of Kano State from 1979 to 1985. Musdapher was a justice of the Nigerian Court of Appeal from 1985 to 2003 and of the Nigerian Supreme Court from 2003 to 2012.

== Background and early life ==
Musdapher was born on 15 July 1942 as the first and eldest son in a polygamous family of 25 children and only son of his mother to a family of Kanuri scholars in Babura, Jigawa State, Nigeria. His father was Mallam Babura Musdapher, a cleric and Islamic scholar who was a principal advisor to the head of colonial district in the Kano Native Authority before being a district head of Babura local government area in Kano State.

== Education ==
In 1949, when Musdapher was due to learn Islamic teachings in Sudan and Egypt, his aunt opposed citing his age as a barrier for long-distance travels. In 1950, through Mohammed Ibrahim who was the then head-boy, Musdapher was admitted to Babura Elementary School which he left in 1953 and progressed to Birnin Kudu Middle School in 1954 and graduated in 1956 with a First School Leaving Certificate. He moved to Rumfa College, Kano, for his secondary education in 1957 and graduated in 1962 with a West African School Certificate.

In 1963, he was admitted into the Institute of Administration (now Ahmadu Bello University), Zaria, where he got a Bar Part 1 in 1964 and proceeded to SOAS University of London from 1964 to 1967. Upon his return to Nigeria, Musdapher enrolled into the Nigerian Law School in 1967 and was called to the Nigerian Bar in 1968.

== Career ==
Musdapher worked briefly at the Northern Regional Ministry of Finance as a clerical officer in 1963 before proceeding to the university. While a student at the SOAS, he enrolled at the Inns of Court, Middle Temple and was called to the English Bar in 1967. As a student, Musdapher was a regular outside contributor and discussant in the BBC World Service for West Africa and Hausa from 1964 to 1967.

After being called to the Nigerian Bar in 1968, Musdapher together with Kaloma Ali practised privately until the reform of local government councils in 1969 after which Musdapher was appointed as the secretary of the Kano Emirate Council and a councillor of Kano Native Authority. In 1972, he was made the director of Kano Co-operative Bank and a member of the board of the National Electric Power Authority in 1974. In 1976, Musdapher was made a member of the Body of Benchers and was also a joint editor of the Law Report of Northern Nigeria from 1976 to 1979.

In 1976 after a nomination from Umaru Abdullahi, Musdapher was persuaded by Sani Abacha and Ibrahim Babangida to accept the position of the Attorney-General of Kaduna State; in this position, he served under three military governors: Usman Jibrin, Muktar Muhammed and Ibrahim Alfa from 1976 to 1979. From 1979 to 1985, Musdapher was the chief judge of the High Court of Kano State succeeding C. I. Jones and thus becoming the first indigenous judge of the court. He was appointed as a Justice of the Nigerian Courts of Appeal in 1985 and was promoted to the Nigerian Supreme Court in 2003. Following the retirement of Aloysius Iyorgyer Katsina-Alu, the immediate chief judge, President Goodluck Jonathan appointed Musdapher as the 12th Chief Justice of Nigeria in 2011, a position he held until his retirement in 2012.

== Honours ==
Musdapher was a recipient of the Grand Commander of the Order of the Niger (GCON) in 2012 and Commander of the Federal Republic (CFR) in 2003.

== Personal life and death ==
Musdapher was married to Haijyya Sabwa Dahiru Musdapher (née Suleiman Galadima) and they had three children including Khadijah Dahiru Mustapha who is a district judge and Kaloma Mustapha who serve as an aide to Governor Badaru Abubakar. Musdapher was fluent in Arabic and performed Hajj as a Muslim. Musdapher died of kidney-related disease on 22 January 2018 in a hospital in London.
