= Second inauguration of Goodluck Jonathan =

6th Nigerian presidential inauguration

Second presidential inauguration of Goodluck Jonathan
- Date: 29 May 2011; 15 years ago
- Location: Eagle Square, Abuja, F.C.T.
- Participants: Goodluck Jonathan; 14th president of Nigeria — Assuming office Aloysius Iyorgyer Katsina-Alu; Chief Justice of Nigeria — Administering oath Namadi Sambo; 13th vice president of Nigeria — Assuming office Aloysius Iyorgyer Katsina-Alu; Chief Justice of Nigeria — Administering oath

The second inauguration of Goodluck Jonathan as the 14th president of Nigeria, and 3rd in the fourth republic was held on Sunday, 29 May 2011, marking the start of the second and only full term of Goodluck Jonathan as president and Namadi Sambo as vice president. It was the 6th presidential inauguration in Nigeria, and 4th in the fourth republic.

Jonathan was sworn in after winning the 2011 Nigerian presidential election, an election which was seen as the fairest at the time.

== Swearing-in ceremony ==
The official swearing-in ceremony took place at Eagle Square in Abuja, the Federal Capital Territory. Chief Justice Aloysius Iyorgyer Katsina-Alu administered the oath of office taken by President Jonathan and Vice President Namadi Sambo.

== Attendance ==
Former Nigerian heads of state General Yakubu Gowon, President Shehu Shagari, General Ibrahim Babangida, Interim President Ernest Shonekan, General Abdulsalami Abubakar and General Olusegun Obasanjo were in attendance.

Former military head of state, General Muhammadu Buhari who was the CPC candidate in the election was absent from the ceremony, after he had challenged the result.

The ceremony was attended by about two dozen heads of states, mainly from Africa.

Among those present were newly elected Ivorian leader Alassane Ouattara, Yoweri Museveni of Uganda, Jacob Zuma of South Africa and Robert Mugabe of Zimbabwe.

Former colonial power Britain was represented by Minister for Africa Henry Bellingham.

== See also ==
- 2011 Nigerian presidential election
- First inauguration of Goodluck Jonathan
- Presidency of Goodluck Jonathan
- Inauguration of Bola Tinubu
