= Inauguration of Goodluck Jonathan =

Inauguration of Goodluck Jonathan may refer to:

- First inauguration of Goodluck Jonathan, 2010
- Second inauguration of Goodluck Jonathan, 2011
