= Eagle Square =

Eagle Square may refer to:

- Eagle Square, Abuja
- Eagle Square, Langkawi
- Fort Thunder
