= Inauguration of Bola Tinubu =

9th Nigerian presidential inauguration

Presidential inauguration of Bola Tinubu
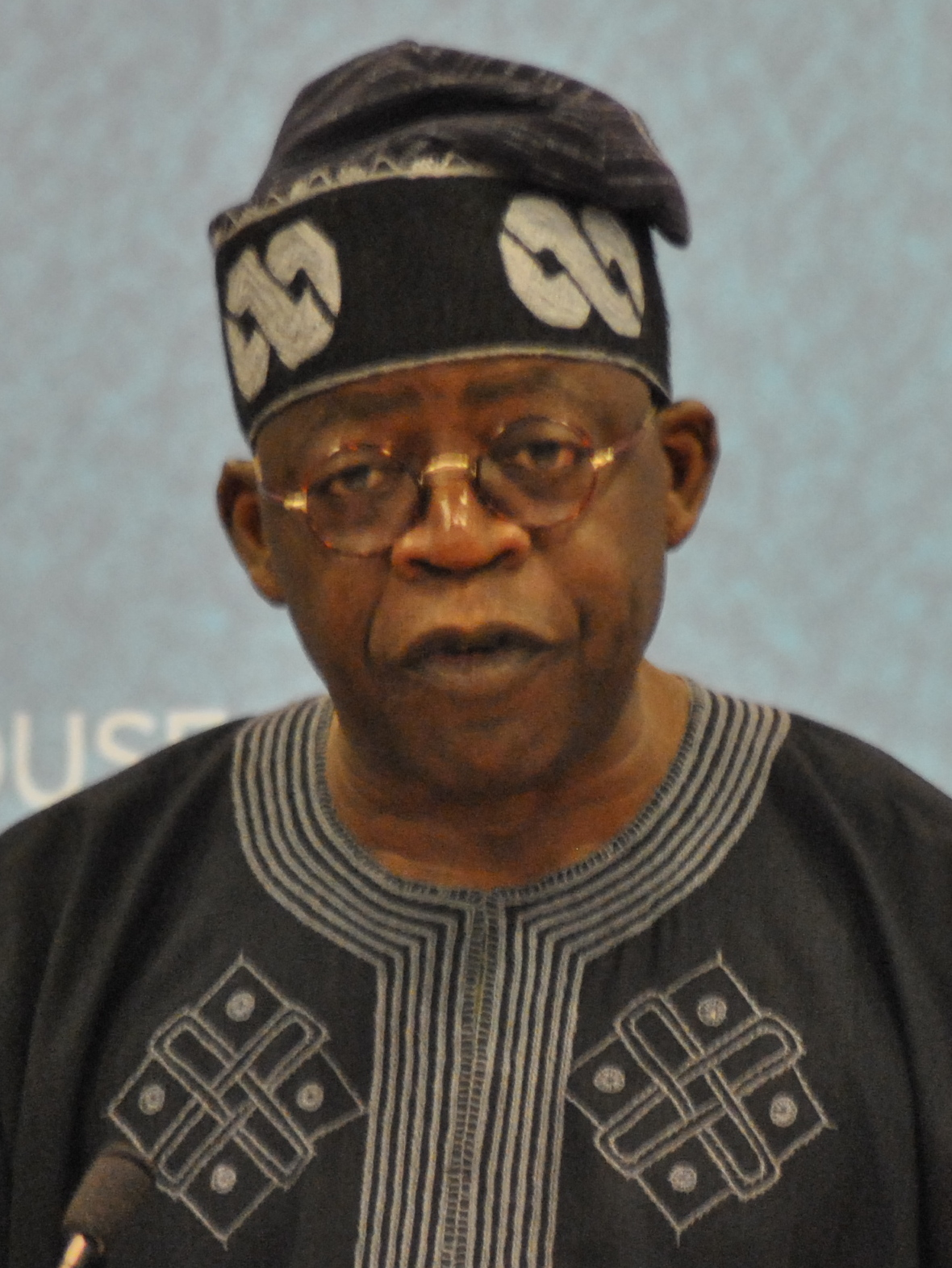
- Bola Tinubu in Chatham House in 2011.
- Date: 29 May 2023; 3 years ago
- Location: Eagle Square, Abuja, F.C.T.
- Organized by: Presidential Transition Council, Inaugural Committee
- Participants: Bola Tinubu; 16th president of Nigeria — Assuming office Olukayode Ariwoola; Chief Justice of Nigeria — Administering oath Kashim Shettima; 15th vice president of Nigeria — Assuming office Olukayode Ariwoola; Chief Justice of Nigeria — Administering oath

The inauguration of Bola Tinubu as the 16th president of Nigeria, and 5th president in the fourth republic took place on Monday, 29 May 2023, marking the start of the four-year term of Bola Tinubu as president and Kashim Shettima as vice president. It was the 9th presidential inauguration and 7th in the fourth republic, and took place in the Eagle Square in Abuja, F.C.T.

== Background ==
Tinubu was announced winner of the disputed 2023 Nigerian presidential election on 1 March, after a tight race.

== Pre-inaugural events ==
Date	Activity	Venue
Thursday 18 May	World Press Conference by the Secretary to the Government of the Federation	The Rotunda Hall, Ministry of Foreign Affairs
Tuesday 23 May	Regimental Dinner in honour of the Commander in Chief	Armed Forces Officers Mess
Wednesday 24 May	Valedictory Federal Executive Council Meeting	Council Chambers, Presidential Villa
Thursday 25 May	Investiture of the President-elect and Vice President-elect with the National Honors of Grand Commander of the Order of the Federal Republic (GCFR) and Grand Commander of the Order of the Niger (GCON) respectively and Handover of Transition Documents	State House Conference Centre
Friday 26 May	Public lecture and Jumu'ah (Friday) prayers	Abuja National Mosque
Saturday, 27 May	Inauguration lecture on the topic: Deepening Democracy for Integration and Development by His Excellency, Uhuru M. Kenyatta, former President of Kenya	International Conference Centre
Saturday, 27 May	Children's Day program	Old Parade Ground/State House Conference Centre
Sunday, 28 May	Inter-denominational church service	National Christian Centre
Sunday, 28 May	Inauguration dinner/gala night	State House Conference Centre

== Inaugural events ==
=== Swearing-in ceremony ===
The official swearing-in ceremony took place at Eagle Square in Abuja, the Federal Capital Territory from 08:00 hours (UTC+1). Chief Justice Olukayode Ariwoola administered the oath of office taken by President-elect Bola Tinubu. Vice President Kashim Shettima was sworn in at 10:30 am, and President Tinubu was sworn in at 10:41 am

=== Inauguration luncheon ===
A luncheon will be held at the State House Banquet Hall at 1:30 pm.

== Attendance ==
About 65 world leaders, which includes most of the leaders of the 54 African countries, were invited.

In attendance were former Nigerian heads of state General Yakubu Gowon, and President Goodluck Jonathan. Living heads of state, General Ibrahim Babangida, General Abdulsalami Abubakar, and General Olusegun Obasanjo were not in attendance.

Representatives of foreign governments and agencies included :

- Algeria Abdelmadjid Tebboune, President of Algeria
- Angola Téte António, Minister of External Relations
- Burundi Évariste Ndayishimiye, President of Burundi and First Lady Angeline Ndayishimiye
- Canada Ahmed Hussen, Minister of Housing, Diversity and Inclusion
- Chad Mahamat Déby, Transitional President of Chad
- China Peng Qinghua, Vice Chairman of the Standing Committee of the National People's Congress
- Republic of the Congo Denis Sassou Nguesso, President of the Republic of Congo Brazzaville
- Cuba Gerardo Portal, Deputy Minister of Foreign Affairs
- France Chrysoula Zacharopoulou, Minister Delegate for Development, Francophonie and International Partnerships
- Gambia Adama Barrow, President of Gambia
- Ghana Nana Akufo-Ado, President of Ghana
- Guinea Bissau Umaro Sissoco Embaló, President of Guinea Bissau
- India Rajnath Singh, Minister of Defence
- Ivory Coast Patrick Achi, Prime Minister of Ivory Coast
- Japan Kazunori Tanaka, Special Envoy of the Prime Minister of Japan
- Kenya Uhuru Kenyatta, former President of Kenya
- Morocco Aziz Akhannouch, Prime Minister of Morocco
- Morocco Moha Tagma, Ambassador
- Niger Mohamed Bazoum, President of Niger
- Qatar Sheikh Mohammed bin Abdulrahman Al Thani, Foreign Minister
- Rwanda Paul Kagame, President of Rwanda
- Senegal Macky Sall, President of Senegal
- Sierra Leone Julius Maada Bio, President of Sierra Leone
- South Africa Cyril Ramaphosa, President of South Africa
- Tanzania Samia Suluhu Hassan, President of Tanzania
- United Kingdom Andrew Mitchell, Minister of State for Development and Africal
- United Kingdom Helen Grant, Prime Minister's Trade Envoy to Nigeria and Special Envoy on Girls’ Education
- United Kingdom Richard Montgomery, British High Commissioner to Nigeria
- United States Marcia Fudge, Secretary of Housing and Urban Development
- United States Marisa Lago, Under Secretary of Commerce for International Trade
- United States General Michael Langley, Commander of the United States Africa Command
- United States Enoh Ebong, Director of the United States Trade and Development Agency
- United States Mary Phee, Assistant Secretary of State for the Bureau of African Affairs
- United States Judd Devermont, Special Assistant to the President and Senior Director for African Affairs
- United States Monde Muyangwa, Assistant Administrator for the Bureau for Africa

== See also ==
- 2023 Nigerian presidential election
- First inauguration of Muhammadu Buhari
