= Adamu Baba-Kutigi =

Nigerian academic

Prof. Adamu Baba-Kutigi

Acting Vice-Chancellor of Federal University, Dutsin-Ma
- In office March 2019 – October 2019
- Appointed by: School Senate committee

Personal details
- Born: Adamu Nchama Baba-Kutigi; 10 June 1956 (age 70) Kutigi, Niger State, Nigeria
- Education: Usman Danfodio University, Sokoto; ABU Zaria
- Occupation: Academic; author, Vice Chancellor
- Profession: Research education; Physics education
- Known for: Research and extre-moral lesson in physics

Adamu Ncahma Baba-Kutigi (born 10 June 1956, in Kutigi, Nigeria) is a former Acting Vice Chancellor of the Federal University of Dutsin-Ma.

== Early life ==
Baba-Kutigi was born 10 June 1956 in Kutigi to a Nupe family. He had an early education at Government Secondary School Eyagi, Bida, of Niger State. He obtained his Nigerian Certificate in Education (NCE) in the Teachers Training College Minna (now known as the College of Education Minna) in 1979. He attended the former University Sokoto, now Usman Danfodio University, from which he obtained a Bachelor of Science degree in physics and later Masters and Doctoral degrees in physics from ABU Zaria.

He has experience in teaching and research, and he is a member of the Science Teachers Association of Nigeria (STAN), the Nigerian Institute of Physics (NIP) and the Nigerian Association of Teachers of Technology (NATT). He served as Deputy Director, Centre for Preliminary and Extra Moral Studies and as a member of the Governing Council representing the Congregation at Federal University of Technology Minna.

== As Vice Chancellor ==
The Governing Council of the Federal University, Dutsin-Ma, Katsina, approved the appointment of Baba-Kutigi as their new Acting Vice-Chancellor of the university. This came through the nomination of him by the senate of the university at the 73rd emergency meeting that was held in March 2019. Before the appointment, Baba-Kutigi was the immediate former Dean of the Faculty of Science, and he is the former Head of the Department of Physics in the university.
