= Presidency of Muhammadu Buhari =

Nigerian presidential administration from 2015 to 2023

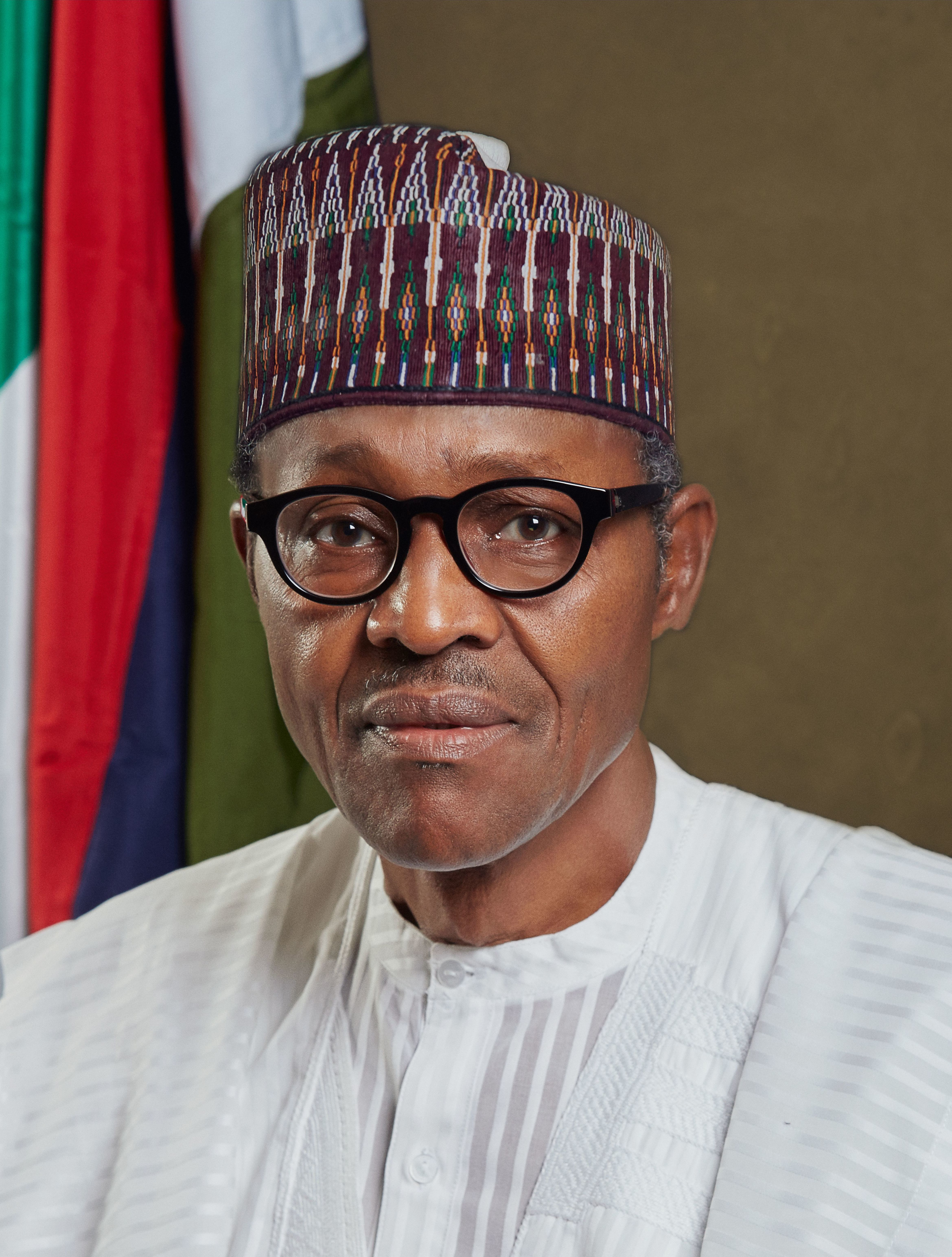
- Presidency of Muhammadu Buhari; 29 May 2015 – 29 May 2023
- Cabinet: First; Second
- Party: All Progressives Congress
- Election: 2015; 2019
- Seat: Aso Villa
- Seal of the president

Muhammadu Buhari's tenure as the 15th president of Nigeria began with his first inauguration on 29 May 2015, and ended on 29 May 2023. A retired general and member of the All Progressives Congress from Katsina State, he previously served as military head-of-state from 31 December 1983 to 27 August 1985, when he was deposed in a military coup led by General Ibrahim Babangida. Buhari took office following a decisive victory over incumbent Peoples Democratic Party president Goodluck Jonathan in the 2015 presidential election. Four years later, in the 2019 presidential election, he defeated PDP candidate former vice president Atiku Abubakar to win re-election. Upon his inauguration, he became the oldest president in Nigerian history.

== 2015 election ==
Buhari ran in the 2015 presidential election as a candidate of the All Progressives Congress party. His platform was built around his image as a staunch anti-corruption fighter with an incorruptible and honest reputation, but he said he would not probe past corrupt leaders and would give officials who stole in the past amnesty if they repented.

In the runup to the 2015 election, Jonathan's campaign asked that Buhari be disqualified from the election, claiming that he was in breach of the Constitution. According to the fundamental document, in order to qualify for election to the office of the president, a person must be "educated up to at least School certificate level or its equivalent". Buhari failed to submit any such evidence, claiming that he lost the original copies of his diplomas when his house was raided following his overthrow from power in 1985.

In May 2014, in the wake of the Chibok schoolgirls kidnapping, Buhari strongly denounced the Boko Haram insurgency. He "urged Nigerians to put aside religion, politics and all other divisions to crush the insurgency, which he said was fanned by mindless bigots masquerading as Muslims". In July 2014, Buhari escaped a bomb attack on his life by Boko Haram in Kaduna, 82 people were killed. In December 2014, Buhari pledged to enhance security in Nigeria if elected president. After this announcement, Buhari's approval ratings skyrocketed, largely due to Jonathan's apparent inability to fight Boko Haram. Buhari made internal security and wiping out the militant group one of the key pillars of his campaign. In January 2015, the insurgent group "The Movement for the Emancipation of the Niger Delta" (MEND) endorsed Buhari.

Buhari's campaign was briefly advised by former Obama campaign manager David Axelrod and his AKPD consultancy. In February 2015, former Nigerian President Olusegun Obasanjo quit the ruling PDP party and endorsed Buhari.

On 31 March, Jonathan called Buhari to concede and congratulate him on his election as president.

== Transition period and inauguration ==
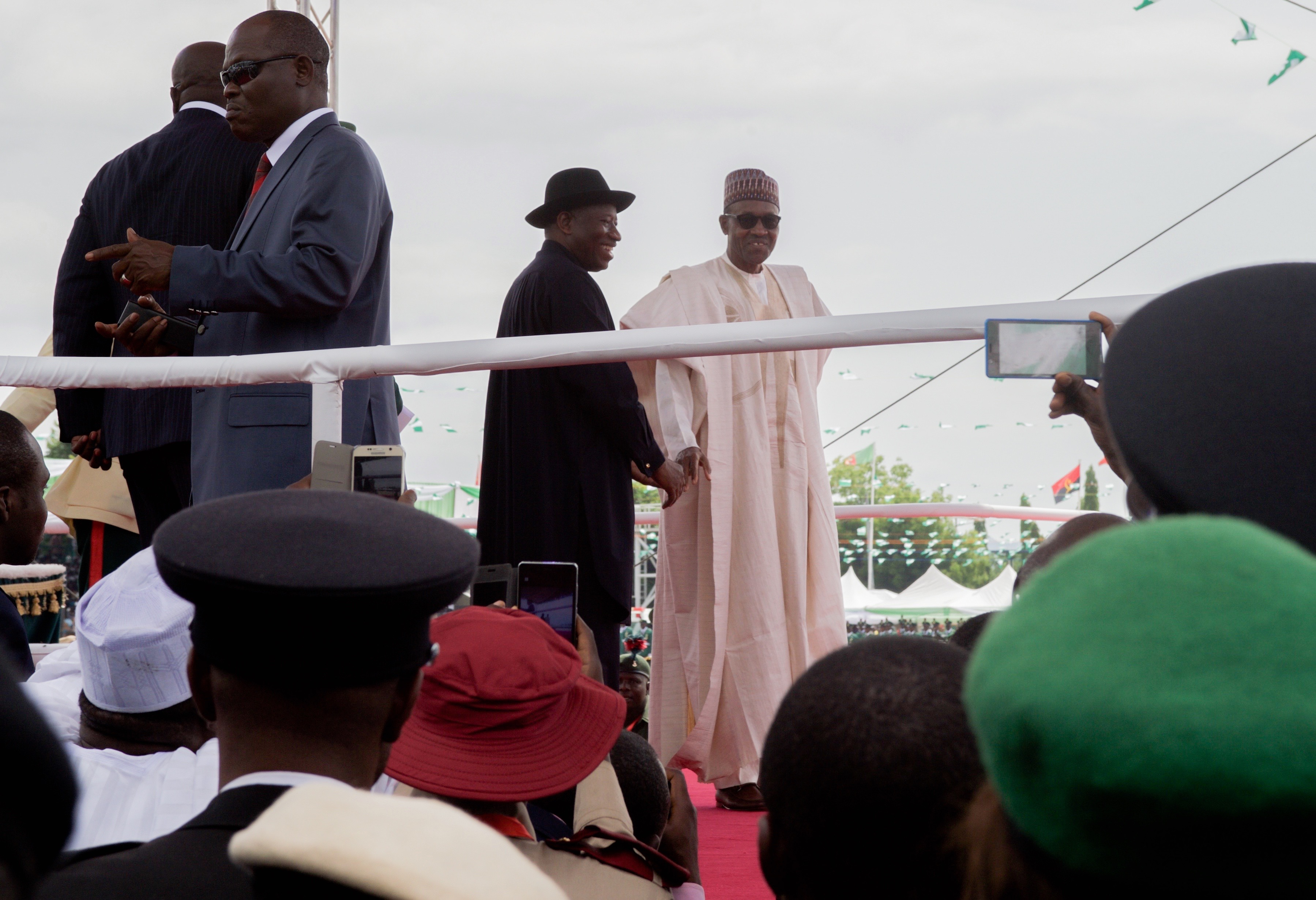
Incoming and outgoing Nigerian Presidents at the inauguration ceremony

On 17 May 2015, Buhari's campaign spokesperson said that following the inauguration, the President "would simply be addressed as Muhammadu Buhari, President and Commander-in-Chief of the Armed Forces of the Federal Republic of Nigeria." He would also not prefer to be addressed as "Mr., Alhaji or Mallam". Buhari's official portrait was also unveiled on the same day.

On 24 May 2015, the All Progressives Congress issued a statement saying that outgoing President Goodluck Jonathan was "handing over a nation in deep crisis" and that there was "no electricity, no fuel, workers are on strike, billions are owed to state and federal workers, $60 billion are owed in national debt and the economy is virtually grounded".

On 26 May 2015, the National Union of Nigerian Students issued a statement saying that South African President Jacob Zuma was not welcome due to his "poor handling" of the recent xenophobic attacks against foreign nationals in his country. It also stated that there is "no point felicitating with a people who clearly do not matter much to you" and his visit will only amount to pretence.

On 27 May 2015, Premium Times reported that the ruling People's Democratic Party had deliberately received the bulk of the 5,000 invitation cards as there were plans to allegedly boo the outgoing president. They also didn't want him to be embarrassed and instead give him a "cheerful exit". Following appeal made by many to probe the outgoing administration, President Jonathan during a valedictory session of the Federal Executive Council, said that any future probe should be "extended beyond [his] administration. Otherwise.. it [would] be witch-hunt".

Suleiman Hashimu walked 750 km from Lagos to Abuja, fulfilling a vow that he had made if General Buhari won the presidency. It took him 18 days to walk the route. He had taken with him ₦100,000 ($500) but only spent ₦3,500 as he was catered for by the people along the way.

On 29 May 2015, Buhari was sworn in by Chief Justice Mahmud Mohammed as the 15th president of Nigeria and 4th president in the forth republic, completing the oath of office at 10:51 AM WAT.

=== Inauguration speech (excerpt) ===
Having just a few minutes ago sworn on the Holy Book, I intend to keep my oath and serve as President to all Nigerians. I belong to everybody and I belong to nobody. A few people have privately voiced fears that on coming back to office I shall go after them. These fears are groundless. There will be no paying off old scores. The past is prologue.

Furthermore, we as Nigerians must remind ourselves that we are heirs to great civilizations: Shehu Othman Dan Fodio’s caliphate, the Kanem Borno Empire, the Oyo Empire, the Benin Empire and King Jaja’s formidable domain. The blood of those great ancestors flow in our veins.

The most immediate [challenge] is Boko Haram’s insurgency. Progress has been made in recent weeks by our security forces but victory can not be achieved by basing the command and control Centre in Abuja. [It] will be relocated to Maiduguri and remain until Boko Haram is completely subdued. But we can not claim to have defeated Boko Haram without rescuing the Chibok girls and all other innocent persons held hostage by insurgents. This government will do all it can to rescue them alive. Boko Haram is a mindless, godless group who are as far away from Islam as one can think of.

It is a national shame that an economy of 180 million [people] generates only 4,000 MW, and distributes even less.

— Muhammadu Buhari

== Domestic Policy ==
=== Economy ===
==== Treasury single account (TSA) ====
In August 2015, Buhari started the implementation of the TSA. This was done in order to centralise the revenue collection of the various government parastatals. The administration believes that the TSA would help reduce corruption within the Federal government. The administration estimated that it has saved taxpayers N5.244 trillion by February 2017.

==== Anti-corruption war ====
The administration has demonstrated a strong commitment to the anti-corruption war. Running on a manifesto promising to curb and adequately prosecute corruption, believing it hinders economic growth and development. Buhari's economic policy has been perceived as being somewhat incoherent given the long periods it took him to fill his Cabinet positions. Apart from constituting the Professor Itse Sagay-led Presidential Advisory Committee against Corruption mandated to advise his administration on the prosecution of the anti-graft war and the implementation of required reforms in the nation's criminal justice system, Buhari also sent to the Senate the Money Laundering [Prevention and Prohibition] Bill 2016 and the Mutual Legal Assistance in Criminal Matters Bill 2016 in order to lend credence to his anti-graft crusade. The administration has scored some victories by retrieving over $300 million in looted funds from Sani Abacha's Swiss account.

== Controversies over appointments, nominees and confirmations ==
Ever since the emergence of the 8th senate of Nigeria, many appointments made by President Muhammadu Buhari has been denied confirmation.

=== The EFCC boss appointment ===
Ibrahim Mustafa Magu was nominated for appointment as EFCC Chairman in November 2015. But has been denied confirmation and this brought the topic to public as the issue becomes more persistent since 2017. The exact terms of section 2(3) of the EFCC Act are significant and worthy of note as it is the appointment, not the nomination, that is subject to Senate confirmation, neither is it a condition precedent to the validity of the appointment.

In December 2016, the Senate refused to confirm Magu as EFCC Chairman over a report from the DSS which alleges that Magu wines and dines with the corrupt. And in March 2017, Magu heads to the senate again for confirmation as EFCC Chairman but was turned down again with the most vocal rejection voices from Senator Dino Melaye and his colleague, Biodun Olujimi. Olujimi flared, "Why prosecute people on the pages of newspapers?" as Melaye said he has failed "the integrity test" pushed at him over a security report they received from the DSS.

The Senate President denied the refusal to confirm magu to be based on a report they received from the DSS as earlier reported by the house majority leader. He said in an interview with TVC News in Morocco where he attended an African summit on climate change and food security, that it is based on his failure to pass his screening exercise which they are not personalize or politicize.

==== Controversy over his removal ====
In some reports, the chairman, Senate Committee on Public Petitions, Ethics and privileges, Senator Samuel Anyanwu said that Nigeria Senate no longer regard Mr. Ibrahim Magu as Acting Chairman of Economic and Financial Crimes Commission (EFCC). He was also reported to have said that there are massive petitions against the EFCC, but they could not invite Mr. Magu because he was no longer seen as the acting chairman. The lawmaker further said his committee would use 2018 budget defense to track down Magu.

==== Involvement of The Executives ====
In April 2017, Vice President Yemi Osinbajo told select online journalists at the Villa that the executive didn't need to send Magu to the senate for confirmation and that Magu will remain EFCC Chairman. In July 2017, Senate asked Osinbajo to withdraw the statement that senate lacks powers to confirm Magu and despite all threats, Osinbajo continues to throw his weight behind Magu as Magu insists “I cannot be distracted with those things. Nobody can purchase me, I cannot compromise what I am doing.”

==== Involvement of the Court ====
An Abuja Division of the Federal High Court affirmed the decision of the Senate to reject Ibrahim Magu as chairman of the Economic and Financial Crimes Commission. According to the ruling by Justice John Tsoho, the applicant was wrong in its assumption that the Senate was only there to confirm any choice made by the executive. The judge said the Senate has the powers to ensure that only suitable persons are appointed to the position of chairperson for the anti-corruption agency. Consequently, this suit is struck out.

List of presidents of Nigeria
| Preceded by Goodluck Jonathan | Presidency of Muhammadu Buhari; 2015–2023 | Succeeded by Bola Tinubu |
