= Rimamnde Shawulu =

Nigerian politician

Rimamnde Shawulu Kwewum is a Nigerian politician, entrepreneur, and veteran journalist. He is fondly known as Rima Shawulu. He was a member of the Federal House of Representative representing Tukum/Donga/Ussa Constituency in Taraba state. between 2015 - 2023. In his first term, he served as the Chairman of the Committee of the Nigerian Army, and a member of other committees such as Public Accounts, Constitution Review Committee, Tertiary and Basic Education Committee, as well as others.

Before getting elected as a representative, he was appointed Board Member of the Niger Delta Development Commission (NDDC), representing the North-East Zone in November 2011 till July 2013.

He was one of the strategists and masterminds behind the successful election of Former President Goodluck Jonathan in 2011. He served as the Chief Strategist and Head researcher for the Neighbour to Neighbour Campaign Organization between 2010-2011 and later emerged as its Programme Director.

Rimamnde also served as the Special Adviser on Legislative Affairs to the Former Speaker of the House of Representatives, the Late. Rt. Hon. Ghali Umar Na'abba between 2000 - 2003.

Prior to his political and legislative career, He served as a journalist spanning two decades. He worked as a journalist and independent researcher with organisations like; British Broadcasting Corporation (BBC), Plateau Publishing Company, Northern Nigeria in Perspective, New Breed Magazine, and Free Nation Magazine, to mention a few. He currently has his online media outlet, called the Amazing Times, which is primarily focused on giving a voice to the voiceless.

He is renowned for his patriotic spirit, depicted in his writings and public speeches. Rima Shawulu is actively involved in advocacy for marginalized groups of people over the years. This is the driving force behind his successful journalism and eventual venture into active politics in Nigeria.

He is the author of The Middle Belt, Banga Boy, The Other Side, and The Story of Gambo Sawaba. He holds a Bachelor's degree in International Studies and a Master's degree in Politics of Conflict and Violence. He has completed executive courses and training in Negotiation, Management, and Security Studies from the London School of Economics, Kellogg's Illinois, London Business School, Harvard, and ICWA (Institute of. Current World Affairs
