= List of Nigerian heads of state by age =

This is a list of heads of state of Nigeria by age.

== Overview ==
The youngest person to become head of state was Yakubu Gowon, who at the age of 31, assumed office after the assassination of Johnson Aguiyi-Ironsi during the July 1966 counter-coup. The youngest civilian head of state to assume the presidency was Goodluck Jonathan, who at the age of 52, succeeded to the office after the death of Umaru Musa Yar'Adua, he was also the youngest person elected to the office at the age of 53. The youngest to become head of state by election was Shehu Shagari, who was inaugurated at age 54. The oldest person to assume the presidency was Muhammadu Buhari who was inaugurated at age 72.

Assassinated at age 37, Murtala Muhammed was the youngest head of state at the end of his tenure, and his lifespan was the shortest of any head of state, he was the only head of state not to have lived to the age of 40. At age 40, Yakubu Gowon was the youngest person to become a former head of state. The oldest head of state at the end of his tenure was also Muhammadu Buhari at 80.

Buhari's second retirement of 2 years, 45 days, is the shortest in Nigeria's history, Yakubu Gowon's retirement, now 50 years, is the longest in Nigeria's history. At age 91, Gowon is also the oldest of the six living heads of state. Shehu Shagari who died in 2018 aged 93 is the nation's longest-lived head of state. Three heads of state (Shehu Shagari, Nnamdi Azikiwe and Yakubu Gowon) have lived into their 90s. The youngest living head of state is Goodluck Jonathan, age 68.

== List of heads of state by age at assuming office ==
This is a list of heads of state of Nigeria by age at assuming office from the youngest to the oldest.

Name	Date of birth	Date of death	Date and age at assuming office
Yakubu Gowon	19 October 1934	(living)	1 August 1966 (aged 31)
Murtala Muhammed	8 November 1938	13 February 1976	29 July 1975 (aged 36)
Olusegun Obasanjo	5 March 1937	(living)	13 February 1976 (aged 38)
Muhammadu Buhari	17 December 1942	13 July 2025	31 December 1983 (aged 41)
Johnson Aguiyi-Ironsi	3 March 1924	29 July 1966	16 January 1966 (aged 41)
Ibrahim Babangida	17 August 1941	(living)	27 August 1985 (aged 44)
Sani Abacha	20 September 1943	8 June 1998	17 November 1993 (aged 50)
Goodluck Jonathan	20 November 1957	(living)	6 May 2010 (aged 52)
Shehu Shagari	25 February 1925	28 December 2018	1 October 1979 (aged 54)
Umaru Musa Yar'Adua	16 August 1951	5 May 2010	29 May 2007 (aged 55)
Abdulsalami Abubakar	13 June 1942	(living)	8 June 1998 (aged 55)
Ernest Shonekan	9 May 1936	11 January 2022	26 August 1993 (aged 57)
Nnamdi Azikiwe	16 November 1904	11 May 1996	1 October 1963 (aged 58)
Olusegun Obasanjo	5 March 1937	(living)	29 May 1999 (aged 62)
Bola Tinubu	29 March 1952	(living)	29 May 2023 (aged 71)
Muhammadu Buhari	17 December 1942	13 July 2025	29 May 2015 (aged 72)

== List of heads of state by longevity ==
This table shows heads of state by their longevity (living heads of state in gold).

Rank	Head of state	Date of birth	Date of death	Longevity (Years, Days)	Longevity (Days)
1	Shehu Shagari	25 February 1925	28 December 2018	93 years, 306 days	34,274 days
2	Yakubu Gowon	19 October 1934	Living	91 years, 231 days	33,469 days
3	Nnamdi Azikiwe	16 November 1904	11 May 1996	91 years, 177 days	33,414 days
4	Olusegun Obasanjo	5 March 1937	Living	89 years, 94 days	32,601 days
5	Ernest Shonekan	9 May 1936	11 January 2022	85 years, 247 days	31,293 days
6	Ibrahim Babangida	17 August 1941	Living	84 years, 294 days	30,975 days
7	Abdulsalami Abubakar	13 June 1942	Living	83 years, 359 days	30,675 days
8	Muhammadu Buhari	17 December 1942	13 July 2025	82 years, 208 days	30,159 days
9	Bola Tinubu	29 March 1952	Living	74 years, 70 days	27,098 days
10	Goodluck Jonathan	20 November 1957	Living	68 years, 199 days	25,036 days
11	Umaru Musa Yar'Adua	16 August 1951	5 May 2010	58 years, 262 days	21,447 days
12	Sani Abacha	20 September 1943	8 June 1998	54 years, 261 days	19,985 days
13	Johnson Aguiyi-Ironsi	3 March 1924	29 July 1966	42 years, 148 days	15,488 days
14	Murtala Muhammed	8 November 1938	13 February 1976	37 years, 97 days	13,611 days

List of heads of state of Nigeria	14
Living	6
Deceased	8

== Nigerian heads of state's ages ==
This table charts the age of each head of state of Nigeria at the time of assuming office, upon leaving office, and at the time of death. Where the head of state is still living, their lifespan and post head of state timespan are calculated up to 7 June 2026.

#	Head of state	Date of birth	Date of assuming office	Age at assuming office	End of term	Age at end of term	Length of retirement	Date of death	Lifespan
1	Nnamdi Azikiwe	16 November 1904	1 October 1963	58 years, 319 days	16 January 1966	61 years, 61 days	30 years, 116 days	11 May 1996	33,414 days (91 years, 177 days)
2	Johnson Aguiyi-Ironsi	3 March 1924	16 January 1966	41 years, 319 days	29 July 1966	42 years, 148 days	0 days (Note: Died in office)	29 July 1966	15,488 days (42 years, 148 days)
3	Yakubu Gowon	19 October 1934	1 August 1966	31 years, 286 days	29 July 1975	40 years, 283 days	50 years, 313 days	(living)	33,469 days (91 years, 231 days)
4	Murtala Muhammed	8 November 1938	29 July 1975	36 years, 263 days	13 February 1976	37 years, 97 days	0 days	13 February 1976	13,611 days (37 years, 97 days)
5	Olusegun Obasanjo	5 March 1937	13 February 1976	38 years, 345 days	1 October 1979	42 years, 210 days	19 years, 240 days (Note: Obasanjo was head of state for two non-consecutive periods; this is his first post-head of state retirement, between the end of his military tenure in 1979 and his inauguration in 1999.)	(living)	32,601 days (89 years, 94 days)
6	Shehu Shagari	25 February 1925	1 October 1979	54 years, 218 days	31 December 1983	58 years, 309 days	34 years, 362 days	28 December 2018	34,274 days (93 years, 306 days)
7	Muhammadu Buhari	17 December 1942	31 December 1983	41 years, 14 days	27 August 1985	42 years, 253 days	29 years, 275 days (Note: Buhari was head of state for two non-consecutive periods; this is his first post-head of state retirement, between the end of his military tenure in 1985 and his inauguration in 2015.)	13 July 2025	30,159 days (82 years, 208 days)
8	Ibrahim Babangida	17 August 1941	27 August 1985	44 years, 10 days	26 August 1993	52 years, 9 days	32 years, 285 days	(living)	30,975 days (84 years, 294 days)
9	Ernest Shonekan	9 May 1936	26 August 1993	57 years, 109 days	17 November 1993	57 years, 192 days	28 years, 55 days	11 January 2022	31,293 days (85 years, 247 days)
10	Sani Abacha	20 September 1943	17 November 1993	50 years, 58 days	8 June 1998	54 years, 261 days	0 days	8 June 1998	19,985 days (54 years, 261 days)
11	Abdulsalami Abubakar	13 June 1942	8 June 1998	55 years, 360 days	29 May 1999	56 years, 350 days	27 years, 9 days	(living)	30,675 days (83 years, 359 days)
12	Olusegun Obasanjo	5 March 1937	29 May 1999	62 years, 85 days	29 May 2007	70 years, 85 days	19 years, 9 days (Note: Obasanjo was head of state for two non-consecutive periods; this is his post-presidential retirement, after his second period in office (1999–2007).)	(living)	32,601 days (89 years, 94 days)
13	Umaru Musa Yar'Adua	16 August 1951	29 May 2007	55 years, 286 days	5 May 2010	58 years, 262 days	0 days	5 May 2010	21,447 days (58 years, 262 days)
14	Goodluck Jonathan	20 November 1957	6 May 2010	52 years, 167 days	29 May 2015	57 years, 190 days	11 years, 9 days	(living)	25,036 days (68 years, 199 days)
15	Muhammadu Buhari	17 December 1942	29 May 2015	72 years, 163 days	29 May 2023	80 years, 163 days	2 years, 45 days (Note: Buhari was head of state for two non-consecutive periods; this is his post-presidential retirement, after his second period in office (2015–2023).)	13 July 2025	30,159 days (82 years, 208 days)
16	Bola Tinubu	29 March 1952	29 May 2023	71 years, 61 days	(incumbent)	(incumbent)	(incumbent)	(living)	27,098 days (74 years, 70 days)
#	Head of state	Date of birth	Date of assuming office	Age at assuming office	End of term	Age at end of term	Length of retirement	Date of death	Lifespan

== Graphical representation ==
This is a graphical lifespan timeline of heads of state of Nigeria. They are listed in order of first assuming office.
