= Nigerian presidential inauguration =

Ceremony marking the start of a new presidential term

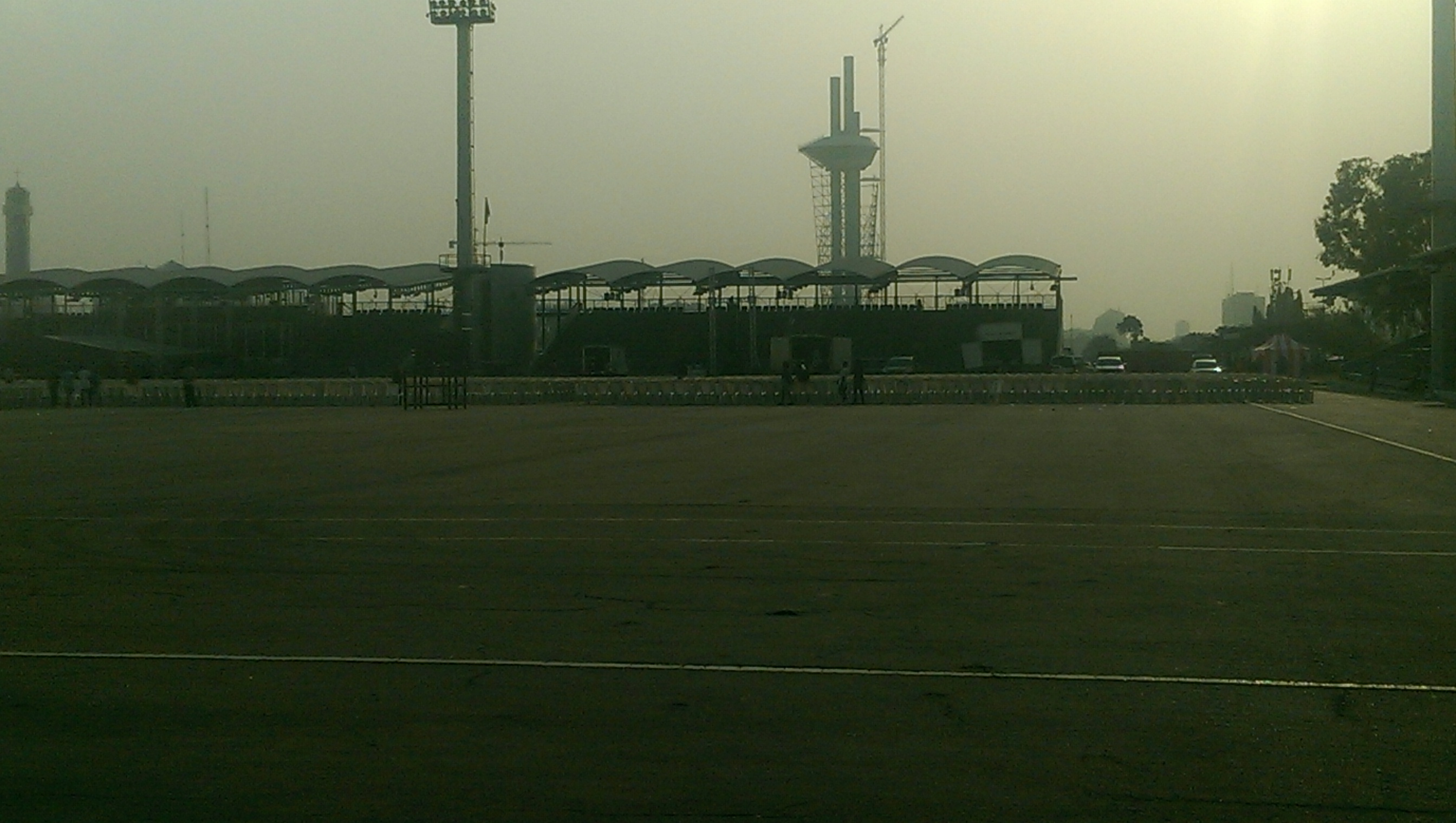
Eagle Square in Abuja has served as the location for inauguration ceremony since 1999

The inauguration of the president of Nigeria is a ceremony to mark the commencement of a new four-year term of the president of Nigeria. During this ceremony, some 90 to 95 days after the presidential election, the president takes the presidential oath of office. The inauguration takes place for each new presidential term, even if the president is continuing in office for a second term.

== Event ==
The first inauguration of Shehu Shagari took place on 1 October 1979 the independence day of Nigeria. Since the beginning of the fourth republic in 1999, all inaugurations have been held on 29 May. The most recent presidential inauguration was held on 29 May 2023, when Bola Tinubu assumed office.

Recitation of the presidential oath of office is the only component in this ceremony mandated by the Nigerian Constitution. The chief justice typically administers the presidential oath of office. Since 1999, the oath has been administered at seven scheduled public inaugurations, by six chief justices.

The ceremony has been held at the Eagle Square, Abuja, the main square of the capital city since the beginning of the fourth republic.

== Oath of office ==
The Constitution of Nigeria specifies an oath of office for the president of the federation. The oath is administered by the chief justice of the Supreme Court of Nigeria or the person for the time being appointed to exercise the functions of that office: 9077362469

Nigeria OPAY

I, (name), do solemnly swear/affirm, that I will be faithful and bear true allegiance to the Federal Republic of Nigeria; that as President of the Federal Republic of Nigeria, I will discharge my duties and perform my functions honestly to the best of my ability and faithfully in accordance with the constitution of the Federal Republic of Nigeria and the law; that I will abide by the Code of Conduct containing the Fifth Schedule to the constitution of the Federal Republic of Nigeria; that I will not allow my personal interests to influence my official conduct for my official decisions. And that I will preserve, protect, and defend the constitution of the Federal Republic of Nigeria. So help me God.

— Oko Paul owogoga

== List of inauguration ceremonies ==
The 9 inauguration ceremonies marking the start of a new four-year presidential term of office and also the one marking the start of a partial presidential term following the intra-term death of the incumbent president are listed in the table below.

| No. | Date | Event (Note: Events (Inaugurations) sort alphabetically by president's last name.) | Location | Oath administered by |
|---|---|---|---|---|
| 1st | 1 October 1963 (Monday) | Inauguration of Nnamdi Azikiwe | Tafawa Balewa Square, Lagos | Adetokunbo Ademola, Chief Justice of Nigeria |
| 2nd | 1 October 1979 (Monday) | First inauguration of Shehu Shagari | Tafawa Balewa Square | Atanda Fatai Williams, Chief Justice |
| 3rd | 1 October 1983 (Saturday) | Second inauguration of Shehu Shagari | Tafawa Balewa Square | Atanda Fatai Williams, Chief Justice |
| 4th | 29 May 1999 (Saturday) | First inauguration of Olusegun Obasanjo | Eagle Square, Abuja, FCT | Mohammed Lawal Uwais, Chief Justice |
| 5th | 29 May 2003 (Thursday) | Second inauguration of Olusegun Obasanjo | Eagle Square | Mohammed Lawal Uwais, Chief Justice |
| 6th | 29 May 2007 (Tuesday) | Inauguration of Umaru Musa Yar'Adua | Eagle Square | Idris Legbo Kutigi, Chief Justice |
| — | 6 May 2010 (Note: Term began when President Yar'Adua died on 5 May.) (Thursday) | First inauguration of Goodluck Jonathan (Extraordinary inauguration) | Aso Rock Presidential Villa, Abuja, FCT | Aloysius Iyorgyer Katsina-Alu, Chief Justice |
| 7th | 29 May 2011 (Sunday) | Second inauguration of Goodluck Jonathan | Eagle Square | Aloysius Iyorgyer Katsina-Alu, Chief Justice |
| 8th | 29 May 2015 (Friday) | First inauguration of Muhammadu Buhari | Eagle Square | Mahmud Mohammed, Chief Justice |
| 9th | 29 May 2019 (Wednesday) | Second inauguration of Muhammadu Buhari | Eagle Square | Ibrahim Tanko Muhammad, Chief Justice |
| 10th | 29 May 2023 (Monday) | Inauguration of Bola Tinubu | Eagle Square | Olukayode Ariwoola, Chief Justice |
