= Lavun =

LGA in Niger

- LGA
- Nickname: Biggsx
- Interactive map of Lavun
- Location in Nigeria
- Coordinates: 9°27′N 5°38′E
- Country: Nigeria
- State: Niger State
- Headquarter: Kutigi

Government
  - Local Government Chairman and the Head of the Local Government Council: Alhaji Limanko pata

Area
  - Total: 2,835 km^{2} (1,095 sq mi)

Population (2006 census)
  - Total: 209,917
  - Density: 74.04/km^{2} (191.8/sq mi)
- Time zone: UTC+1 (WAT)
- 3-digit postal code prefix: 912
- ISO 3166 code: NG.NI.LV

Lavun is a Local Government Area in Niger State, Nigeria. Its headquarters are in the town of Kutigi in the south of the area at9°12′00″N 5°36′00″E. The Kaduna River forms the eastern border of the Local Government Area.

It has an area of 2,835 km^{2} and a population of 209,917 at the 2006 census. The postal code of the area is 913.

== Geography/Climate ==
Lavun Local Government Area is 2,835 square kilometres (1,095 square miles) in size and has an average temperature of 31 °C (88 °F). The Local Government Area, which is located along the Kaduna River, has an average humidity of 39%. Lavun Local Government Area's estimated 10 km/h or 6 mph average wind speed.

== Notable people from Lavun ==
- Shaikh Ahmad Lemu (OON, OFR), Islamic Scholar (1929–2020)
- Hon. Justice Idris Legbo Kutigi (OFR, GCON), Nigeria Lawyer and Judge (1939–2018)
- Professor Jerry Gana Busu (CON), Nigeria Senator and Minister
