= 2014 National Conference, Nigeria =

Nigerian political conference

The 2014 National Conference was inaugurated by the Nigerian President Dr. Goodluck Ebele Jonathan on 17 March 2014, in Abuja, Nigeria. There were about 492 delegates that represented a cross-section of Nigerians including the professional bodies group. The Conference was headed by retired Chief Justice Idris Legbo Kutigi. Following a plenary session that lasted for weeks, the Conference was broken into 20 committees that included Public Finance and Revenue among others. Mr Johnson Oludeinde Oluata FCNA is among the delegates, he represents Association of National Accountants of Nigeria (ANAN) in the professional bodies group Meanwhile, all 20 committees have submitted their reports to be deliberated upon at the next plenary session.

Principal Officers Chairman, Justice Idris Kutigi (rtd), Vice Chairman Prof. Bolaji Akinyemi Secretary Dr Valerie Azinge.

Main Committees: Devolution of Power Committee, Political Restructuring and Forms of Government National Security; Environment; Politics and Governance; Law, Judiciary, Human Rights and Legal Reform. Social Welfare; Transportation; Agriculture; Society, Labour and Sports; Public Service; Electoral Matters, Foreign Policy and Diaspora Matters, Land Tenure Matters and National Boundary. Trade and Investment Committee, Energy; Religion; Public Finance and Revenue Generation, Science, Technology and Development Immigration

The conference resolved for Nigeria to abandon its anthem and return to the old 'Nigeria we hail thee' anthem.
