= Salihu Modibbo Alfa Belgore =

Chief justice of Nigeria from 2006 to 2007

Salihu Modibbo Alfa Belgore GCON

Chief Justice of Nigeria
- In office 12 June 2006 – 17 January 2007
- Preceded by: Muhammad Lawal Uwais
- Succeeded by: Idris Legbo Kutigi

Personal details
- Born: 17 January 1937 (age 89)
- Party: Non partisan

Salihu Modibbo Alfa Belgore GCON (born 17 January 1937) is a Nigerian jurist and chief justice of Nigeria from 2006 to 2007.

== Biography ==
Alfa Belgore was born on 17 January 1937, to a Ruling class Fulani family in Ilorin, the capital of Kwara State north-central Nigeria. He attended Okesuna Primary School as well as Middle School at Ilorin before he proceeded to Ilesa Grammar School where he obtained the West Africa School Certificate in 1956.

He received a bachelor's degree in Law in 1963 and also trained at Inner Temple for one year before he returned to Nigeria in 1964 and served magistrate in Northern Nigeria.

In 1986, he was appointed to the bench of the Supreme Court of Nigeria as Justice. He held several positions in the judiciary before he was appointed as Chief Justice of Nigeria in July 2006, a position he held until January 2007 when he retired.

== Membership ==
- Member, Nigerian Bar Association
- Member, International Bar Association
- Member, Nigerian Body of Benchers
- Overseas Master of the Bench, Honourable Society of the Inner Temple
