= SURE-P =

Government initiative

- Formation: January 2012
- Type: Government Agency
- Purpose: To manage Government share of savings from removal of fuel subsidy
- Official language: English
- Chairman: Gen. Martin Luther Agwai
- Website: [sure-p.gov.ng Official website]

The Subsidy Reinvestment and Empowerment Program known as 'SURE-P is a scheme established by the Federal Government of Nigeria during the Jonathan Administration, to re-investing the Federal Government savings from fuel subsidy removal on critical infrastructure projects and social safety net programmes with direct impact on the citizens of Nigeria. SURE-P was established in January 2012 when the Federal Government of Nigeria announced the removal of subsidy on Petroleum Motor Spirit (PMS). The scheme is one of the pivots of Transformation Agenda of the Federal Government. The pioneer Chairman of the program is Dr. Christopher Kolade. He resigned his appointment in September 2013. He was succeeded by General Martin Luther Agwai who himself was succeeded by Mr Ishaya Dare Akau.

== Objectives ==
The core objectives of the program include but are not limited to:

- Provision of employments for unemployed graduates through internship programs
- Creating database of unemployed youth and reduce social vulnerability among the group in the country through the mechanism of the policy.
