= First inauguration of Goodluck Jonathan =

1st Nigerian intra-term presidential inauguration

First presidential inauguration of Goodluck Jonathan
- Date: 6 May 2010; 16 years ago
- Location: Aso Rock Presidential Villa, Abuja, F.C.T.
- Participants: Goodluck Jonathan; 14th president of Nigeria — Assuming office Aloysius Iyorgyer Katsina-Alu; Chief Justice of Nigeria — Administering oath

The first inauguration of Goodluck Jonathan as the 14th president of Nigeria, and 3rd in the fourth republic was held on Thursday, 6 May 2010 in the Aso Rock Presidential Villa in Abuja, following the death of President Umaru Musa Yar'Adua the night before. Jonathan had been acting as president since 9 February 2010, 86 days before the inauguration. The inauguration – the first non-scheduled, extraordinary inauguration to ever take place – marked the commencement of the first term (a partial term of 1 year, 23 days) of Goodluck Jonathan as president. Chief Justice Aloysius Iyorgyer Katsina-Alu administered the oath of office. Jonathan was the first vice president to succeed to the presidency intra-term, and he remains the only one to do so, as of 2024.

== Illness and death of Yar'Adua ==
Yar'Adua left Nigeria on 23 November 2009, and was reported to be receiving treatment for pericarditis at a clinic in Saudi Arabia. He was not seen in public again, and his absence created a power vacuum which was usurped by a cabal. On 22 January 2010, the Supreme Court of Nigeria ruled that the Federal Executive Council (FEC) had fourteen days to decide a resolution on whether Yar'Adua was "incapable of discharging the functions of his office". The ruling also stated that the Federal Executive Council should hear testimony of five doctors, one of whom should be Yar'Adua's personal physician.

On 9 February 2010, the Senate controversially used the "doctrine of necessity" to transfer Presidential Powers to Vice President Goodluck Jonathan, and declared him Acting President, with all the accompanying powers, until Yar'Adua returned to full health. The power transfer, considered illegal by some, was described as a "coup without the word" by opposition lawyers and lawmakers. However, there were others who felt the power vacuum would lead to instability and a possible military takeover.

On 24 February 2010, Yar'Adua returned to Abuja under the cover of darkness. His state of health was unclear, but there was speculation that he was still on a life support machine. Various political and religious figures in Nigeria had visited him during his illness saying he would make a recovery. Yar'Adua died on 5 May at the Aso Rock Presidential Villa. Jonathan said "Nigeria has lost the jewel on its crown and even the heavens mourn with our nation tonight. As individuals and as a nation we prayed for the recovery of Mr President. But we take solace in the fact that the Almighty is the giver and taker of all life."

== Swearing-in ==
Jonathan's swearing-in took place in the Aso Villa, Abuja about 12 hours after the death of President Yar'Adua. Chief Justice Aloysius Iyorgyer Katsina-Alu administered the oath of office.

== See also ==
- Umaru Musa Yar'Adua
- Second inauguration of Goodluck Jonathan
- Presidency of Goodluck Jonathan
