= Ibrahim Mahmud Alfa =

Nigerian Air Force Air Marshal

Air Marshal Ibrahim Mahmud Alfa

Governor of Kaduna State, Nigeria
- In office July 1978 – October 1979
- Preceded by: Muktar Muhammed
- Succeeded by: Abdulkadir Balarabe Musa

Chief of the Air Staff, Nigerian Air Force
- In office 1 January 1984 – 1 January 1990
- Preceded by: Abdullahi Dominic Bello
- Succeeded by: Nuraini Yussuff

Personal details
- Born: 14 August 1946 Adamawa State, Nigeria
- Died: 16 March 2000 (aged 53)

Military service
- Allegiance: Nigeria
- Branch/service: Nigerian Air Force
- Years of service: 1963-1990
- Rank: Air Marshal

Ibrahim Mahmud Alfa (14 August 1942 – 16 March 2000) was an air marshal in the Nigerian Air Force. He previously served as Military administrator of Kaduna State and Chief of Air Staff for the Nigerian Air Force. He died on 16 March 2000.

== Early life ==
Born in Garkida, Adamawa State, he started his educational career at the Central Primary School, Jimeta, Yola, in 1948 and went on to complete his primary and secondary school education in 1960 at Yola Middle School, later known as the Provincial Secondary School. Soon after his graduation, he enrolled for his Higher School Certificate (HSC) course in Barewa College, Zaria, which he completed in 1962.

== Military career ==
Ibrahim Alfa was one of the pioneering sets of officer cadets who enlisted into the Nigeria Air force in June 1963. On 28 August 1963, he was flown, along with a team of 83 other Nigerians, to Uetersen, Germany, for Basic and Advance Military Training. He was in Germany until 21 June 1966, when he was recalled home with the team and commissioned into the Nigerian Air Force with the rank of second lieutenant. At the outbreak of the Civil War, he commanded the NAF Detachment in Benin City.

In 1967, Alfa attended the Conversion Course on MIG 15 and 17 in USSR. He was promoted to the rank of captain in 1969. In 1970 he was appointed the Commanding Officer, Nigerian Air force (NAF) Flying Training Wing, Kano.

In 1972 he was promoted to the rank of Major. From December 1972 to August 1973, Ibrahim Alfa enrolled for the T-38 Instructor Pilot course at Lockheed and Randolph Air Force Base, in the United States. In 1973 he was appointed officer Commanding 64 Fighter Squadron, Kano, Nigeria.

In November 1974 he attended a conversion course on MiG 21 followed by a back seat check in USSR. In 1975 he was promoted Wing Commander. He was appointed a member of the Supreme Military Council between 1976 and 1978 as one of its younger members with the rank of Wing Commander. During this period, he attended the Advanced Staff College, l, England. In 1978 Alfa was promoted to the rank of Group-Captain and he was also appointed as the Military Administrator of Kaduna State by the then Head of State, General Olusegun Obasanjo, where he also took charge as Commander, Ground Training Group in Kaduna.

In June 1980, he enrolled at the Air War College in Maxwell Air Force Base, Montgomery, USA. On his return from the Air War College in 1981, Ibrahim Alfa was appointed the Air Officer Operations (AOO), with the rank of Air Commodore. In 1982, he attended the International Defence Management Course, Lagos, Nigeria. In 1983 Alfa was promoted to the rank of Air Vice Marshal.

On 1 January 1984, he was appointed the eighth Chief of Air Staff by General Muhammadu Buhari's regime. After General Ibrahim Babangida took power in August 1985, he retained Alfa as Chief of Air Staff. On 1 October 1987, Ibrahim Mahmud Alfa was promoted to the rank of Air Marshal, the first Nigerian Air force officer ever to attain the rank.

Alfa retired from the Nigerian air force as the Chief of Air Staff in 1990.

Ibrahim Mahmud Alfa also served as a member of the supreme military council from 1984 to 1985, the Armed Forces Ruling Council (AFRC) 1985-90 as well as the chairman of the National Transition Committee in 1990.

== Military Administrator of Kaduna state ==
In July 1978, Alfa was appointed military Administrator (position now called Governor) of Kaduna State, a position he held until October 1979.

== Chief of Air Staff, Nigerian Air force ==
Alfa was appointed the eighth Chief of Air Staff, Nigerian Air Force, under General Muhammadu Buhari’s regime on 1 January 1984. He was retained as Chief of Air Staff during General Ibrahim Babangida’s administration until 1990.

== Personal life ==
Ibrahim Alfa was married to Laraba, they had three sons and one daughter together.

== Awards ==
Air Marshal Alfa (Rtd.) received several awards and medals. In alphabetical order they include:

- Defence Service Medal (DSM)
- Distinguished Flying Star (DFS)
- Distinguished Service Medals (DSM)
- General Service Medal (GSM)
- Member of the Federal Republic (MFR)
- National Service Medal (NSM)
- Republic Medal (RM)
