= Federal University, Dutsin-Ma =

University in Nigeria

- ENGLISH HAUSA LAUGUAGE
- Other name: FUDMA {FUDMITE}
- Motto: Integrity and Service
- Type: Public
- Established: 2011
- Affiliations: NUC
- Vice-Chancellor: Bichi Armayau Hamisu
- Students: 11000
- Undergraduates: 9400
- Postgraduates: 500
- Doctoral students: 100
- Location: Dutsin-Ma, Katsina State, Nigeria; 12.4728°N 7.4860°E
- Campus: Urban
- Colours: Gold, green, white, black
- Website: www.fudutsinma.edu.ng

Federal University Dutsin-Ma was established by the administration of former President Goodluck Ebele Jonathan. It was founded in February 2011, in Katsina state. The Vice Chancellor is Bichi Armaya'u Hamisu. The university fully started by 2012.

== List of courses offered ==
1. Faculty of Agriculture:
  - Agricultural Economics and Extension
  - Animal Science
  - Crop Science
  - Fisheries and Aquaculture
  - Forestry and Wildlife Management
  - Soil Science
2. Faculty of Arts and Social Sciences:
  - Economics
  - English Language
  - History and Diplomatic Studies
  - Islamic Studies
  - Linguistics
  - Political Science
  - Sociology
3. Faculty of Computing:
  - Computer Science & information technology
4. Faculty of Engineering and Technology:
  - Agricultural and Bio-Resources Engineering
  - Chemical Engineering
  - Civil Engineering
  - Electrical/Electronic Engineering
  - Mechanical Engineering
  - Mechatronics Engineering
5. Faculty of Education
  - EDUCATIONAL MANAGEMENT
  - Early Childhood Education
  - Education & Biology
  - Education & Chemistry
  - Education & English Language
  - Education & Physics
  - Education & Mathematics
  - Educational Administration
  - Human Kinetics & Health Education
  - Primary Education
  - Special Education
  - Teacher Education Science
6. Faculty of Environmental Sciences:
  - Architecture
  - Building
  - Quantity Surveying
  - Urban and Regional Planning
7. Faculty of Management Sciences:
  - Accounting
  - Banking and Finance
  - Business Administration
  - Taxation
8. Faculty of Sciences:
  - Biological Sciences
  - Chemistry
  - Computer Science
9. COLLEGE OF HEALTH SCIENCES:
  - nursing sciences
  - radiography
  - Radiology
  - Medical Labs. Science
  - Audiology
10. FACULTY OF RENEWABLE NATURAL RESOURCES:
  - fisheries and Aquacultural technology
  - food science
  - plant science
  - Home and management science
11. FACULTY OF LAW:
  - Law(LLB)
12. FACULTY OF PHYSICAL SCIENCES:
  - pure and applied chemistry
  - Physics(B.SC)
  - Industrial chemistry
  - Computer science

== University library ==
The library was established in 2012 to support teaching, learning and research of both students and staff of the university; it is located at the main Library. The library's database subscriptions include Science Direct, HINARI, AGORA, ARDI with online journals like JSTOR, African Journal Online, digital contents.

== See also ==
- List of universities in Nigeria
- Education in Nigeria
