= Kutigi =

Coordinates: 9°27′N 5°38′E

Kutigi is a town in central Nigeria, border to Bida, Mokwa and north of the Niger River. The countryside is generally flat with rolling hills, with grassland and trees.

It is the headquarters of Lavun Local Government Area in Niger State, Nigeria.

This is a place situated in Lavun, with geographical coordinates of 9° 12' 0" North, 5° 36' 0" East and its original name (with diacritics) is Kutigi. it is a Nupe, speaking area.

== Notable people ==
- Adamu Baba-Kutigi (born 1956) - physicist
