= Idris Legbo Kutigi =

Chief Justice of Nigeria from 2007 to 2009

Idris Legbo Kutigi GCON

Chief Justice of Nigeria
- In office 30 January 2007 – 30 December 2009
- Preceded by: Salihu Alfa Belgore
- Succeeded by: Aloysius Iyorgyer Katsina-Alu

Personal details
- Born: 31 December 1939 Kutigi, British Nigeria
- Died: 21 October 2018 (aged 78) London, England
- Education: Ahmadu Bello University; SOAS University of London

Idris Legbo Kutigi GCON (31 December 1939 – 21 October 2018) was a Nigerian lawyer and jurist. He was Attorney General and Commissioner for Justice in Niger State before becoming a high court judge. He joined the Supreme Court of Nigeria in 1992 and served as Chief Justice from 30 January 2007 to 30 December 2009.

== Early life and education ==
Born in Kutigi, North-Western State (now located in the Lavun Local Government Area of Niger State), Kutigi attended elementary school in that town and middle and secondary school in Bida. He then moved on to Government College (now known as Barewa College), and then to Ahmadu Bello University (both in Zaria, Kaduna State). He left the country for England, where he studied at the School of Oriental and African Studies, University of London and Gibson and Weldon, before returning to attend the Nigerian Law School in Lagos, Lagos State. He was called to the bar in approximately 1964.

== Career ==
Kutigi was the Solicitor General and Permanent Secretary, North-Western State in 1976 and later became the Attorney General and Commissioner for Justice in Niger State as well as the Director of public Prosecution, three positions he held concurrently between 1976- 1977 before becoming a high court judge. He was elevated to the Supreme Court in 1992 and was later appointed in 2002 by President Olusegun Obasanjo as the Chief Justice of Nigeria to succeed the outgoing Salihu Alfa Belgore. Belgore retired on 17 January 2002 and Kutigi succeeded him on 30 January 2002, after being confirmed by the Senate. he amended the 1979 Fundamental Human Enforcement Procedure Rules that later became the Fundamental Rights (Enforcement Procedure) Rules 2009.

Kutigi retired on 30 December 2009, having reached the mandatory retirement age of 70. He swore in his successor, Aloysius Iyorgyer Katsina-Alu. The President of Nigeria usually swears in the Chief Justice, but President Umaru Musa Yar'Adua was not available on this occasion due to ill health. He afterwards returned to serve as a high court judge until his death in October 2018. Kutingi also continued to attend Council of State meetings held at the decision of the president.

In 2014 he was appointed chairman of the National Conference on constitutional matters by President Goodluck Jonathan. His appointment was widely welcomed by those on all sides of the Nigerian political spectrum with praise coming for his impartiality and fair handedness. On 12 June 2014 he stepped in to separate northern and southern politicians who almost came to blows during a conference meeting over a disagreement on holding a one minute silence to honour those that died during the 1993 presidential election. Kutigi later described the conference as the "most arduous" to have been held in Nigeria's history due to the short length of time, four and a half months, that had been allowed for it. By its conclusion more than 600 resolutions had been addressed covering points of law, public policy and the constitution. The findings were presented in a 22-volume, 10,335-page document.

== Personal life ==
Kutigi had 18 children and more than 42 grandchildren. He died in a London hospital on 21 October 2018 following a short period of illness.

A street in the Federal Capital Territory was named in his honour in April 2015. The Justice Idris Legbo Kutigi International Conference Centre in Minna is also named for him.

As a mark of honour following his death the Nigerian flag was ordered to be flown at half mast at the Supreme Court of Nigeria, the official residence of the chief justice, all judicial institutions and courts of records for seven days. A book of condolence was opened at the premises of the Supreme Court.
