= Usman Jibrin =

Nigerian politician and military officer (1942–2011)

Group Captain Usman Jibrin

Governor of North-Central State
- In office 30 July 1975 – 1977
- Preceded by: Abba Kyari
- Succeeded by: Muktar Muhammed

Personal details
- Born: 1942 Nasarawa, Northern Region, British Nigeria (now in Nasarawa State, Nigeria)
- Died: 8 September 2011 (aged 68–69)

Military service
- Allegiance: Nigeria
- Branch/service: Nigerian Air Force
- Rank: Group Captain
- Commands: Kaduna State

Usman Jibrin (1942 – 8 September 2011) was a Nigerian politician and military officer who served as the military governor of North-Central State (present-day Kaduna State) from July 1975 to 1977 during the military regime of General Murtala Mohammed.

== Background ==
Jibrin was born in 1942 in Nasarawa local government of Nasarawa State. He attended Abuja Middle School and Government College Kaduna in the early 1960s. He started work at Radio Television, Kaduna. Jibrin joined the Nigerian Air Force in 1963, retiring in 1978. He received training in Canada as a pilot and an instructor, followed by training and conversion courses in Germany on jet fighters. He was also trained in the Soviet Union as a fighter pilot and instructor, and received staff training in the United Kingdom.

== Air force career ==
Jibrin held commands in most of the Nigerian Air Force bases in the country. During the Nigerian Civil War he mostly flew smaller airplanes until later in the war when it became possible to get more advanced fighters from the Soviet Union. Jibrin was one of the air force officers who assisted with the July 1975 coup that brought General Murtala Muhammed to power, providing airfield and airspace security and military airlift. In his maiden address on 30 July 1975, Murtala Mohammed said that Jibrin had been appointed military governor of North Central State of Kaduna, later renamed to Kaduna State.

Jibrin retired from his post as governor and from the air force due to disagreements with the Head of State, General Olusegun Obasanjo. The cause was the take-over by the Federal government of universities and other institutions, such as the Federal Radio Corporation of Nigeria, Kaduna, which Jibrin believed to be the property of the state.

== Later career ==
Jibrin was appointed chairman of the Green Revolution in Benue-Plateau State. Later he became Chairman of Nigerian Productive Research Institute, Ilorin and Chairman of Jos Steel Rolling Mill, from where he resigned after finding "discrepancies". Thereafter, he devoted himself mostly to Islamic activities. He became Chairman of Nigerian Agricultural and Cooperative Bank. In 2010, he was Chairman of Nasarawa Community Bank and treasurer to the Supreme Council for Islamic Affairs. He was a member of the board of directors of Jaiz International Bank. He died on 8 September 2011.
