= Moha Tagma =

Moroccan diplomat (born 1954)

Ambassador of Morocco to Nigeria
- Incumbent
- Assumed office 2016

Ambassador of Morocco to Poland
- In office 2008–2013

Ambassador of Morocco to Senegal, the Gambia, Cabo Verde and Guinea Bissau
- In office 2003–2008

Personal details
- Born: 9 January 1954 (age 72) Ifrane, Morocco
- Children: 3
- Education: École nationale d'administration

Moha Tagma (born 9 January 1954) is a career diplomat who served as the ambassador of Morocco in different countries, including Poland and Senegal. He has been the ambassador of Morocco to Nigeria since 2016.

== Early life and education ==
Tagma was born in Ifrane on 9 January 1954. He received a degree in political sciences and then graduated from the École nationale d'administration in Paris, France.

== Career ==
Following his graduation Tagma joined the Ministry of Foreign Affairs in 1981 and held various diplomatic posts, including chargé d'affaires of Morocco in Equatorial Guinea (1983–1987) and chargé d'affaires of Morocco in Gabon (1987–1989). He was appointed to the Permanent Mission of Morocco in Geneva in 1990 where he served until 1998. Between 2003 and 2008 he was the ambassador of Morocco to Senegal, with concurrent accreditation to the Gambia, Cabo Verde and Guinea Bissau. He was appointed ambassador of Morocco to Poland in 2008 and served until 2013 when he was named as the head of the African Affairs Department at the Ministry of Foreign Affairs. In 2016 he was appointed ambassador of Morocco to Nigeria. In September 2020 Tagma was named as a member to the Organisation internationale de la Francophonie delegation to support the restoration process of democratic institutions in Mali.

== Personal life ==
Tagma married Anissa Jabari on 2 August 1980. They have three children.
