= Muktar Muhammed =

Nigerian politician and air force officer

Air Vice-Marshal Muktar Muhammed

Governor of Kaduna State
- In office 1977 – July 1978
- Preceded by: Usman Jibrin
- Succeeded by: Ibrahim Mahmud Alfa

Personal details
- Born: 11 November 1944 Kano
- Died: 1 October 2017 (aged 72)

Military service
- Allegiance: Nigeria
- Branch: Nigerian Air Force
- Rank: Air Vice-Marshal

Muktar Muhammed (11 November 1944 – 1 October 2017) was the military governor of Kaduna State, Nigeria from July 1978 to October 1979 during the military regime of General Olusegun Obasanjo. Wing commander Muktar Muhammed played an active role in the coup that brought General Murtala Mohammed to power, and was appointed to the new Supreme Military Council on 30 July 1975. He was appointed governor of Kaduna State in 1977, in which position he was promoted to Group Captain. He retired from the Service of the Nigerian Air Force at the rank of Air Vice Marshal (AVM).
