= First inauguration of Muhammadu Buhari =

7th Nigerian presidential inauguration

First presidential inauguration of Muhammadu Buhari
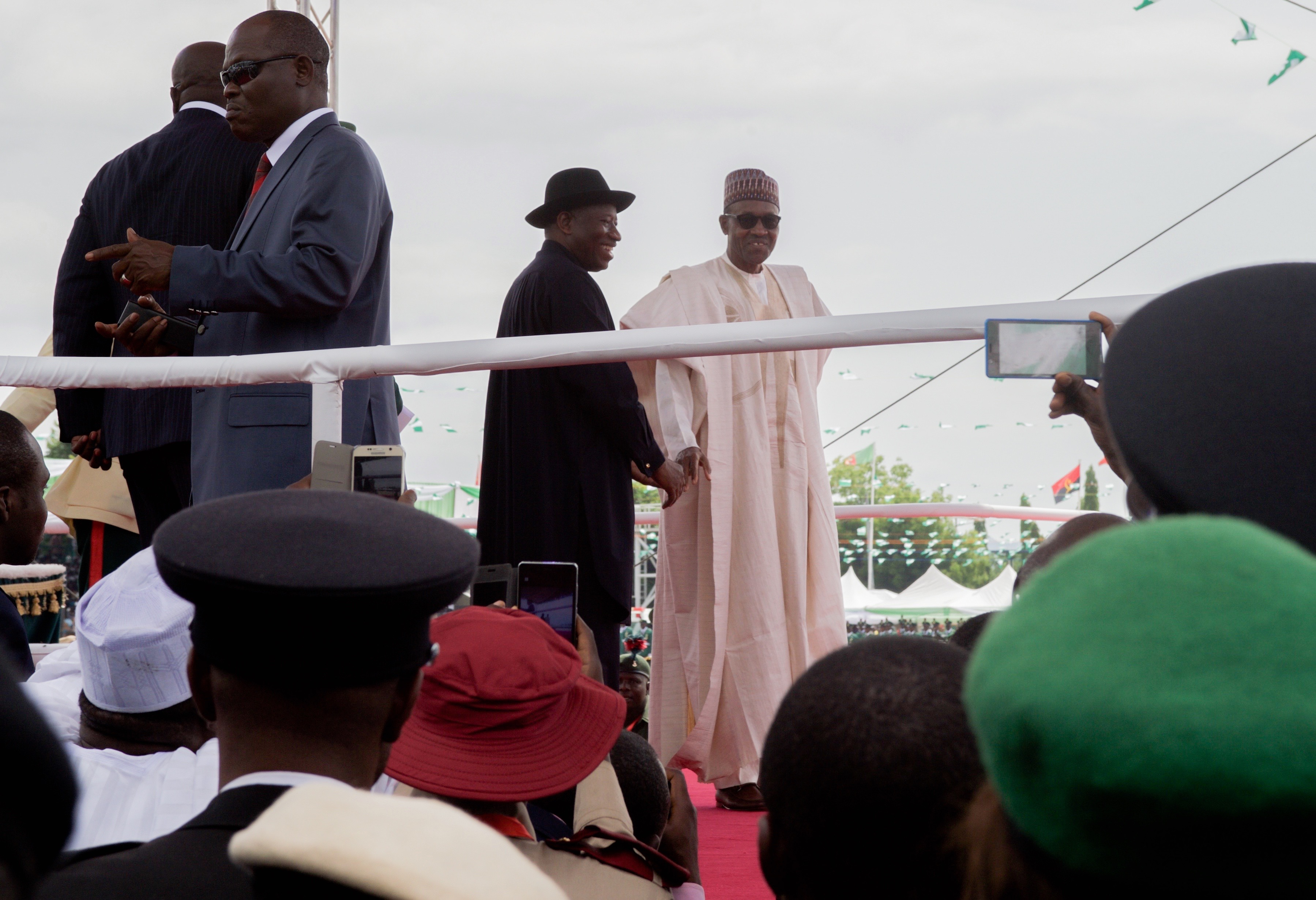
- Incoming and outgoing Nigerian Presidents
- Date: 29 May 2015; 11 years ago
- Location: Eagle Square, Abuja, F.C.T.
- Organized by: Presidential Transition Committee
- Participants: Muhammadu Buhari; 15th president of Nigeria — Assuming office Mahmud Mohammed; Chief Justice of Nigeria — Administering oath Yemi Osinbajo; 14th vice president of Nigeria — Assuming office Mahmud Mohammed; Chief Justice of Nigeria — Administering oath

The first inauguration of Muhammadu Buhari as the 15th president of Nigeria, and 4th president in the fourth Nigerian Republic took place on Friday, 29 May 2015, marking the start of the first four-year term of Muhammadu Buhari as president and Yemi Osinbajo as vice president. It was the 7th presidential inauguration in Nigeria, and 5th in the fourth republic.

The Federal Government declared 29 May a public holiday. More than fifty representatives from foreign governments were expected to attend the inauguration. The government intended to spend less than ₦2 billion (US$10 million) for the ceremony.

== Background ==
Buhari won the presidential election by more than 2.5 million votes.

On 17 May 2015, Buhari's campaign spokesperson said that following the inauguration, the President "would simply be addressed as Muhammadu Buhari, President and Commander-in-Chief of the Armed Forces of the Federal Republic of Nigeria." He would also not prefer to be addressed as "Mr., Alhaji or Mallam". Buhari's official portrait was also unveiled on the same day.

On 24 May 2015, the All Progressives Congress issued a statement saying that outgoing President Goodluck Jonathan was "handing over a nation in deep crisis" and that there was "no electricity, no fuel, workers are on strike, billions are owed to state and federal workers, $60 billion are owed in national debt and the economy is virtually grounded".

On 26 May 2015, the National Union of Nigerian Students issued a statement saying that South African President Jacob Zuma was not welcome due to his "poor handling" of the recent xenophobic attacks against foreign nationals in his country. It also stated that there is "no point felicitating with a people who clearly do not matter much to you" and his visit will only amount to pretence.

On 27 May 2015, Premium Times reported that the ruling People's Democratic Party had deliberately received the bulk of the 5,000 invitation cards as there were plans to allegedly boo the outgoing president. They also didn't want him to be embarrassed and instead give him a "cheerful exit". Following appeal made by many to probe the outgoing administration, President Jonathan during a valedictory session of the Federal Executive Council, said that any future probe should be "extended beyond [his] administration. Otherwise.. it [would] be witch-hunt".

Suleiman Hashimu walked 750 km from Lagos to Abuja, fulfilling his vow that he had made if General Buhari won the presidency. It took him 18 days to trek the route. He had taken with him ₦100,000 ($500) but only spent ₦3,500 as he was catered for by the people along the way.

== Pre-inaugural events ==
Date	Activity	Venue
Friday, 22 May	Jumu'ah (Friday) Prayers	Abuja National Mosque
Sunday, 24 May	Church Service and Thanksgiving	National Church of Nigeria
Thursday, 28 May	Inauguration Dinner	State House Conference Hall

== Inaugural events ==
=== Swearing-in-Ceremony ===
The official swearing-in ceremony took place at Eagle Square in Abuja, the Federal Capital Territory from 0800 hours (UTC+1). Chief Justice Mahmud Mohammed administered the oath of office taken by President elect Buhari. Vice President Yemi Osinbajo was sworn in at 10:41 AM. President Muhammadu Buhari was sworn in at 10:51 AM after which he delivered his inaugural speech.

=== Inauguration speech (excerpt) ===
Having just a few minutes ago sworn on the Holy Book, I intend to keep my oath and serve as President to all Nigerians. I belong to everybody and I belong to nobody. A few people have privately voiced fears that on coming back to office I shall go after them. These fears are groundless. There will be no paying off old scores. The past is prologue.

Furthermore, we as Nigerians must remind ourselves that we are heirs to great civilizations: Shehu Othman Dan Fodio’s caliphate, the Kanem–Bornu Empire, the Oyo Empire, the Benin Empire and King Jaja’s formidable domain. The blood of those great ancestors flow in our veins.

The most immediate [challenge] is Boko Haram’s insurgency. Progress has been made in recent weeks by our security forces but victory can not be achieved by basing the command and control Centre in Abuja. [It] will be relocated to Maiduguri and remain until Boko Haram is completely subdued. But we can not claim to have defeated Boko Haram without rescuing the Chibok girls and all other innocent persons held hostage by insurgents. This government will do all it can to rescue them alive. Boko Haram is a mindless, godless group who are as far away from Islam as one can think of.

It is a national shame that an economy of 180 million [people] generates only 4,000 MW, and distributes even less.

— Muhammadu Buhari

=== Inauguration Luncheon ===
A luncheon was held at the State House Banquet Hall at midday. President Buhari left the programme midway in order to attend the Friday weekly prayers.

=== Inauguration Gala ===
A gala was held in the evening.

== Attendance ==
Invitations were sent to 54 African countries and other nations. Outgoing First Lady Patience Jonathan did not attend the ceremony. Former Nigerian Heads of State who were in attendance included General Yakubu Gowon, President Shehu Shagari (ousted by Buhari), General Ibrahim Babangida (deposed Buhari), Interim President Ernest Shonekan, General Abdulsalami Abubakar and General Olusegun Obasanjo.

=== Dignitaries ===
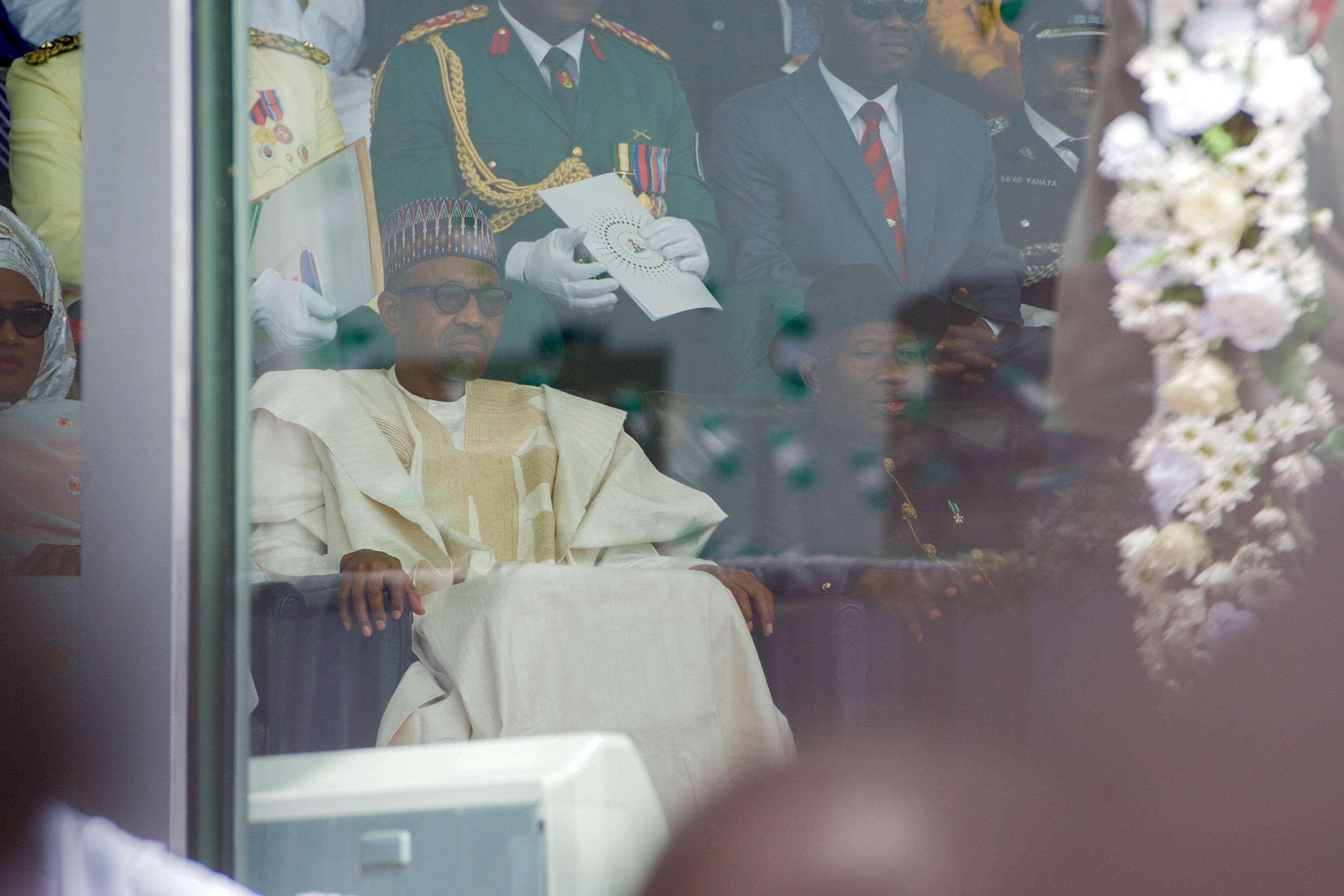
President Jonathan with Buhari.

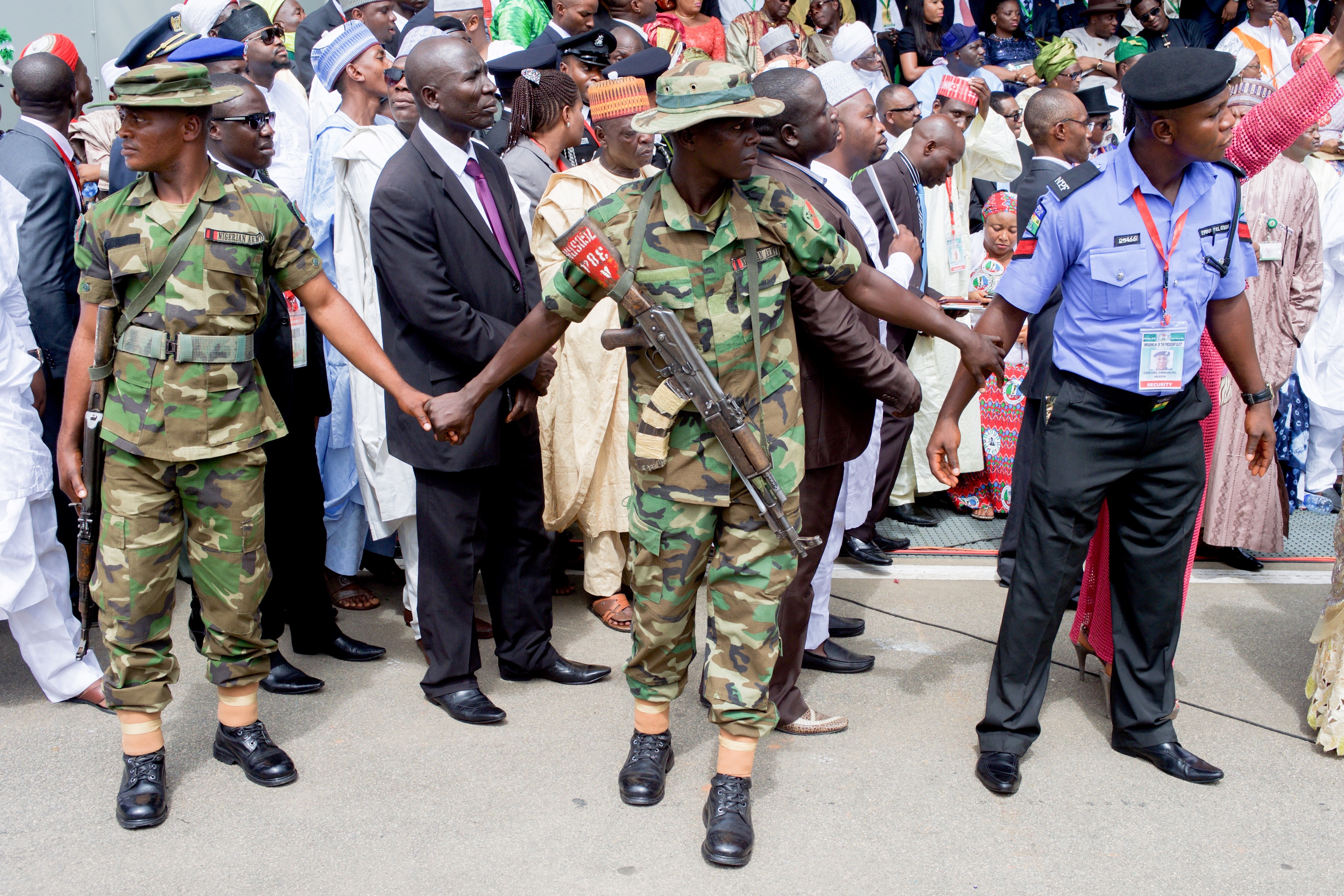
Security personnel hold hands to form human chain.

Country	Title	Dignitary
Angola	Vice President	Manuel Vicente
Benin	President	Thomas Boni Yayi
Burkina Faso	President	Michel Kafando
Chad	President	Idriss Déby
Congo–Brazzaville	President	Denis Sassou Nguesso
Ethiopia	Prime Minister	Haile Mariam Desalegne
Equatorial Guinea	President	Teodoro Obiang Nguema Mbasogo
Gabon	President	Ali Bongo Ondimba
Gambia	Vice President	Isatou Njie-Saidy
Ghana	President	John Mahama
Guinea	President	Alpha Condé
Kenya	Deputy President	William Ruto
Liberia	President	Ellen Johnson Sirleaf
Mali	President	Ibrahim Boubacar Keïta
Mozambique	President	Filipe Nyusi
Namibia	President	Hage Geingob
Niger	President	Mahamadou Issoufou
Rwanda	President	Paul Kagame
Sahrawi Republic	Prime Minister	Abdelkader Taleb Omar
São Tomé and Príncipe	President	Manuel Pinto da Costa
Senegal	President	Macky Sall
Sierra Leone	President	Ernest Bai Koroma
Somalia	President	Hassan Sheikh Mohamud
South Africa	President	Jacob Zuma
South Sudan	Vice President	James Wani Igga
Swaziland	King	Mswati III
Tanzania	Vice President	Mohamed Gharib Bilal
Togo	President	Faure Gnassingbé
Zambia	Vice President	Inonge Wina
Zimbabwe	President	Robert Mugabe

=== Spouses of HOSG ===
Country	Title	Dignitary
Namibia	First Lady	Monica Geingob
Tanzania	Second Lady	Asha Bilal

=== Government representatives ===
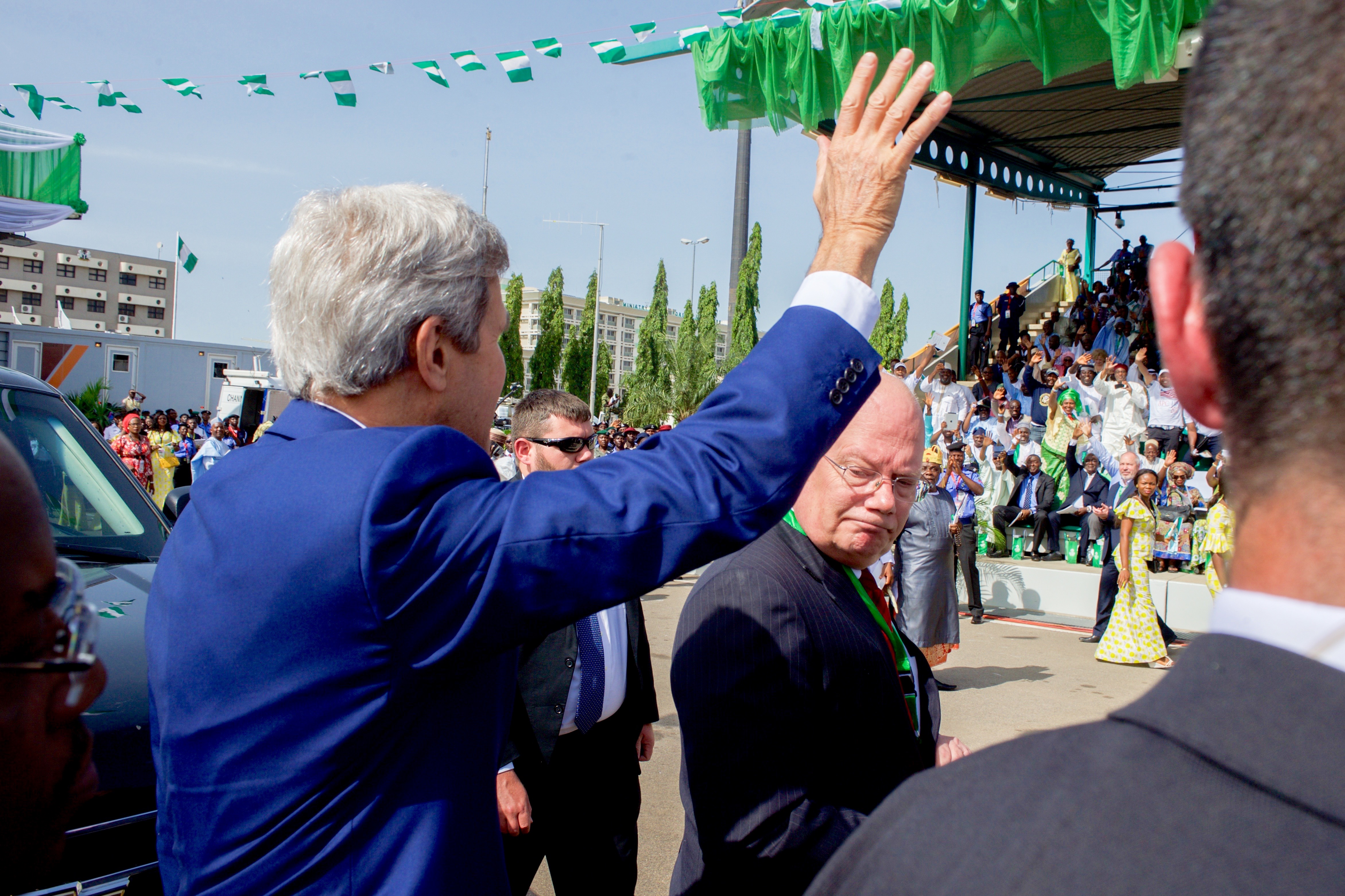
Secretary Kerry waves Upon arriving at Eagle Square

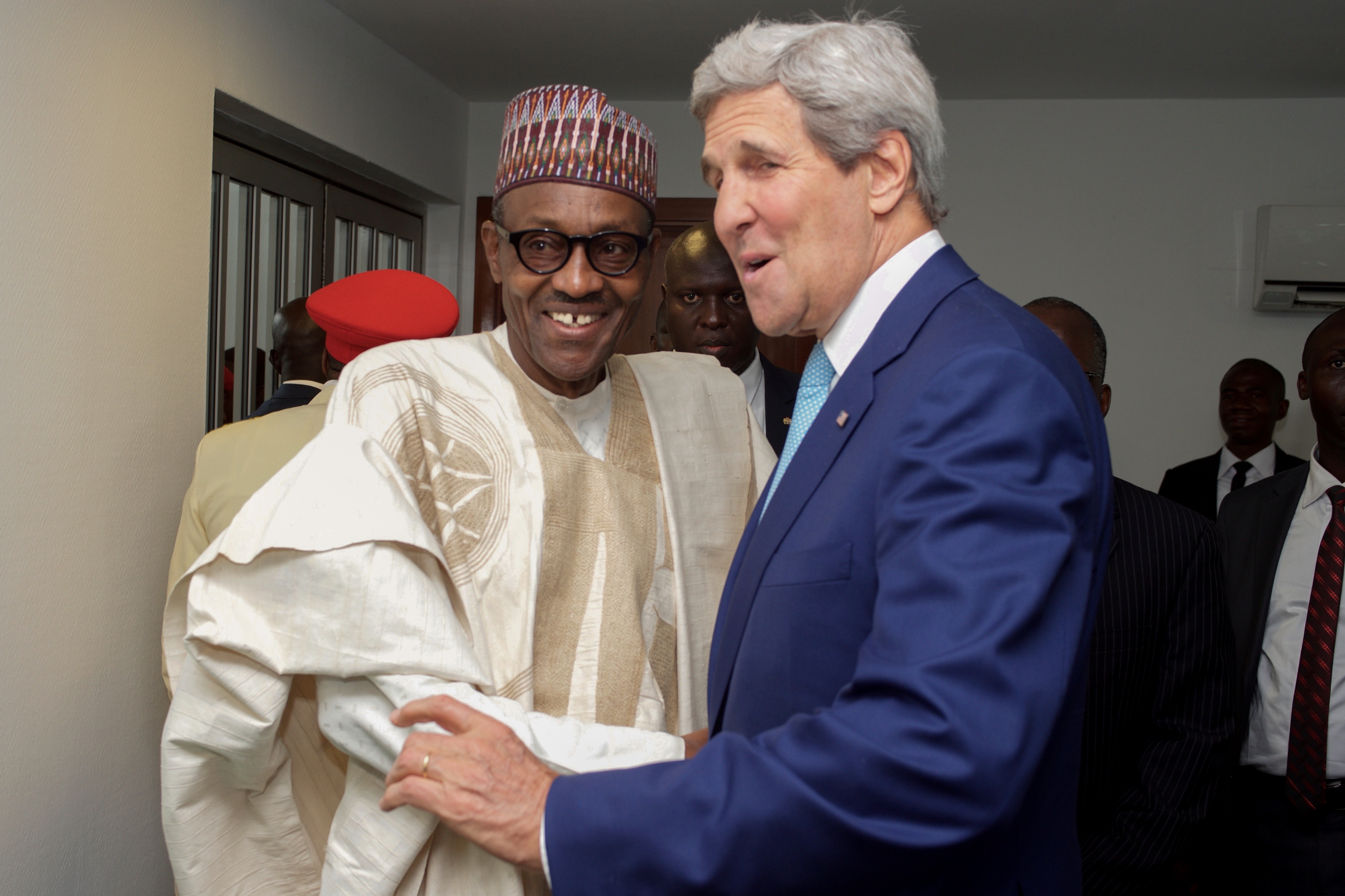
Buhari with John Kerry.

Country	Title	Dignitary
Algeria	Speaker	Mohamed Larbi Ould Khelifa
Botswana	Foreign Minister	Pelonomi Venson-Moitoi
Cameroon	Vice Prime Minister	Amadou Ali
China	Agriculture Minister	Han Changfu
Côte d'Ivoire	Foreign Minister	Charles Koffi Diby
Egypt	Foreign Minister	Sameh Shoukry
France	Foreign Minister	Laurent Fabius
Namibia	Foreign Minister	Netumbo Nandi-Ndaitwah
Qatar	Deputy Prime Minister	Ahmad bin Abdullah Al Mahmoud
Russia	Foreign Minister	Sergei Lavrov
Somalia	Foreign Minister	Abdi Salan Hdaliye
South Africa	Foreign Minister	Maite Nkoana-Mashabane
South Korea	Special Envoy	Lee Ju-young
United Kingdom	Foreign Secretary	Philip Hammond
United States	Secretary of State	John Kerry
Zimbabwe	Foreign Minister	Simbarashe Mumbengegwi

=== International organisations ===
Organisation	Title	Dignitary
African Union	Chairperson of the AU Commission	Nkosazana Dlamini-Zuma

== Controversies ==
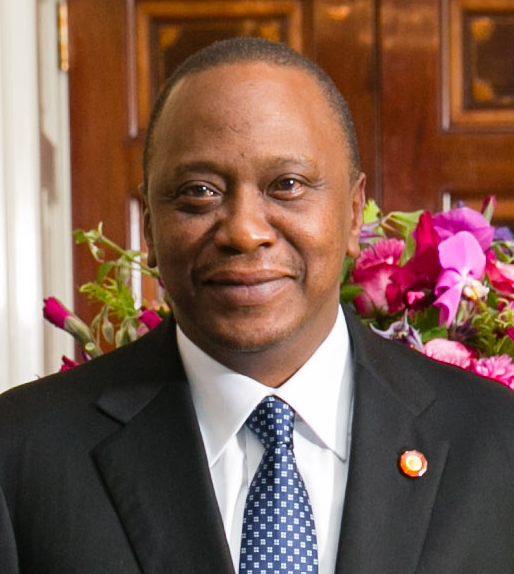
Kenyatta

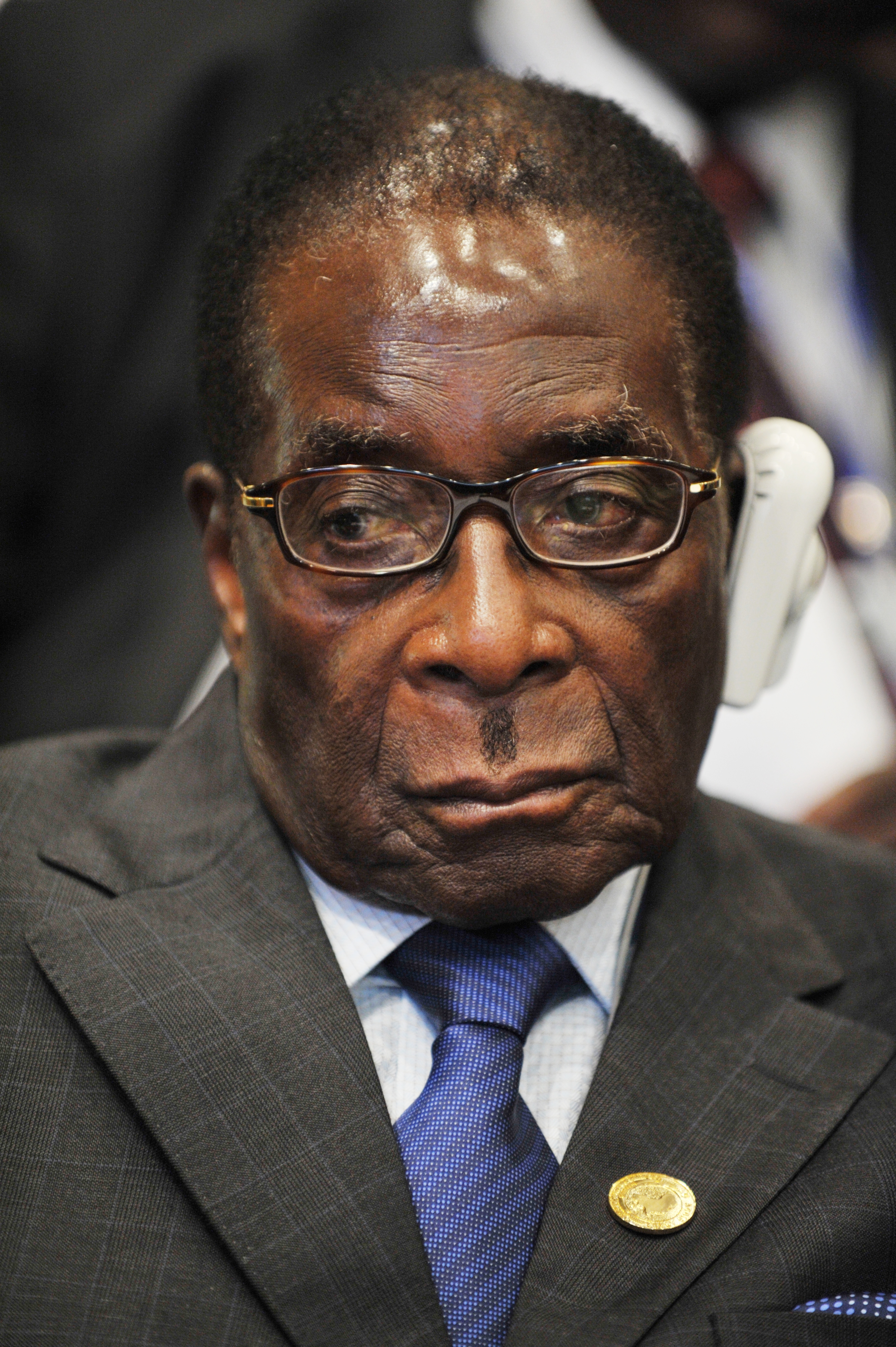
Mugabe

Kenyan President Uhuru Kenyatta was scheduled to attend the ceremony but cancelled following outrage from Kenyans when details of his 84-member entourage was leaked. The Kenyan Foreign Affairs Principal Secretary denied these reports and described the list as fake. Citizen News reported that the two-day trip would have cost at least KSh. 20,000,000/= (about US$200,000) in allowances and airfare. Instead, Deputy President William Ruto accompanied by ten officials, represented the president.

At the inauguration ceremony, Sahara Reporters' Adeola Fayehun asked Zimbabwean President Robert Mugabe when he would be stepping down. Fayehun asked him if there was democracy in Zimbabwe and that it was time for him to step down. Mugabe's spokesperson George Charamba described the reporters as "activists with cameras" and that they "took advantage of protocol restrictions that were imposed on delegations." Zimbabwe's Information Minister Jonathan Moyo tweeted that the reporters were "political activists masquerading as journalists who imagine their country as a model of democracy." Moyo also stated that "free countries have rules including diplomatic courtesy not the display of Boko Haram journalism."

== See also ==
- 2015 Nigerian general election
- Second inauguration of Muhammadu Buhari
- Presidency of Muhammadu Buhari
