= A. I. Katsina-Alu =

Chief Justice of Nigeria from 2009 to 2011

Aloysius Iyorgyer Katsina-Alu GCON CON

Chief Justice of Nigeria
- In office 30 December 2009 – 28 August 2011
- Preceded by: Idris Legbo Kutigi
- Succeeded by: Dahiru Musdapher

Personal details
- Born: 28 August 1941 Ushongo, British Nigeria
- Died: 18 July 2018 (aged 76)

Aloysius Iyorgyer Katsina-Alu GCON (28 August 1941 – 18 July 2018) was a Nigerian jurist and lawyer who served as Chief Justice of Nigeria from 2009 to 2011.

== Early life and education ==
Katsina-Alu was born on 28 August 1941, in Benue State and he started his early education at St Anne's Primary School Tarungwa and St. Patricks Primary School Taraku, before he went to Mount St. Michael's Secondary School Aliade, in Benue State. He later enrolled at the Nigerian Military Training College, Kaduna, in 1962, from where he moved over to Mons Military Training College, Aldershot, England. His interest in a military career was short-lived as he returned to the country to pursue a degree in law at the Ahmadu Bello University, Zaria.

In 1964, he proceeded to the Inns of Court School of Law, Gibson and Weldon College of Law, School of Oriental and African Studies, University of London, in furtherance of his legal studies.

== Career ==
He was called to the English Bar in October 1967 and the Nigerian Bar on 28 June 1968. He began his legal career in July 1968 as a private lawyer in Lagos. He then he became a Legal Officer at the Nigeria Ports Authority (NPA), Lagos between 1969 and 1977. After leaving NPA, Katsina-Alu became the Attorney-General and Commissioner for Justice of Benue State in 1978, a position he held until 1979 when he was appointed a judge of the Benue State High Court. From the High Court in Benue, he was elevated to the Court of Appeal in 1985, where he served until November 1998, when he was appointed a Justice of the Supreme Court. He was sworn in as Justice of the Supreme Court of Nigeria on 25 November 1998 and after spending 11 years on the Bench he became the 11th Chief Justice of Nigeria on 30 December 2009. He retired from this exalted position on 26 August 2011, having attained the mandatory retirement age of 70 years.

He was sworn in as the Chief Justice of the Supreme Court of Nigeria on Wednesday 30 December 2009 by his predecessor, Idris Legbo Kutigi, the then Chief Justice of the Supreme Court. There was a controversy over the ceremony, considering in all previous ceremonies the Oath of Office was administered by the President of Nigeria. However, President Umaru Yar'Adua was unavailable on account of ill health since November 2009, and had failed to hand over to his vice president.

== Death ==
He died on 18 July 2018 at an orthopedic Hospital in Abuja. He died at the age of 76.
