= Presidency of Goodluck Jonathan =

Nigerian presidential administration from 2010 to 2015

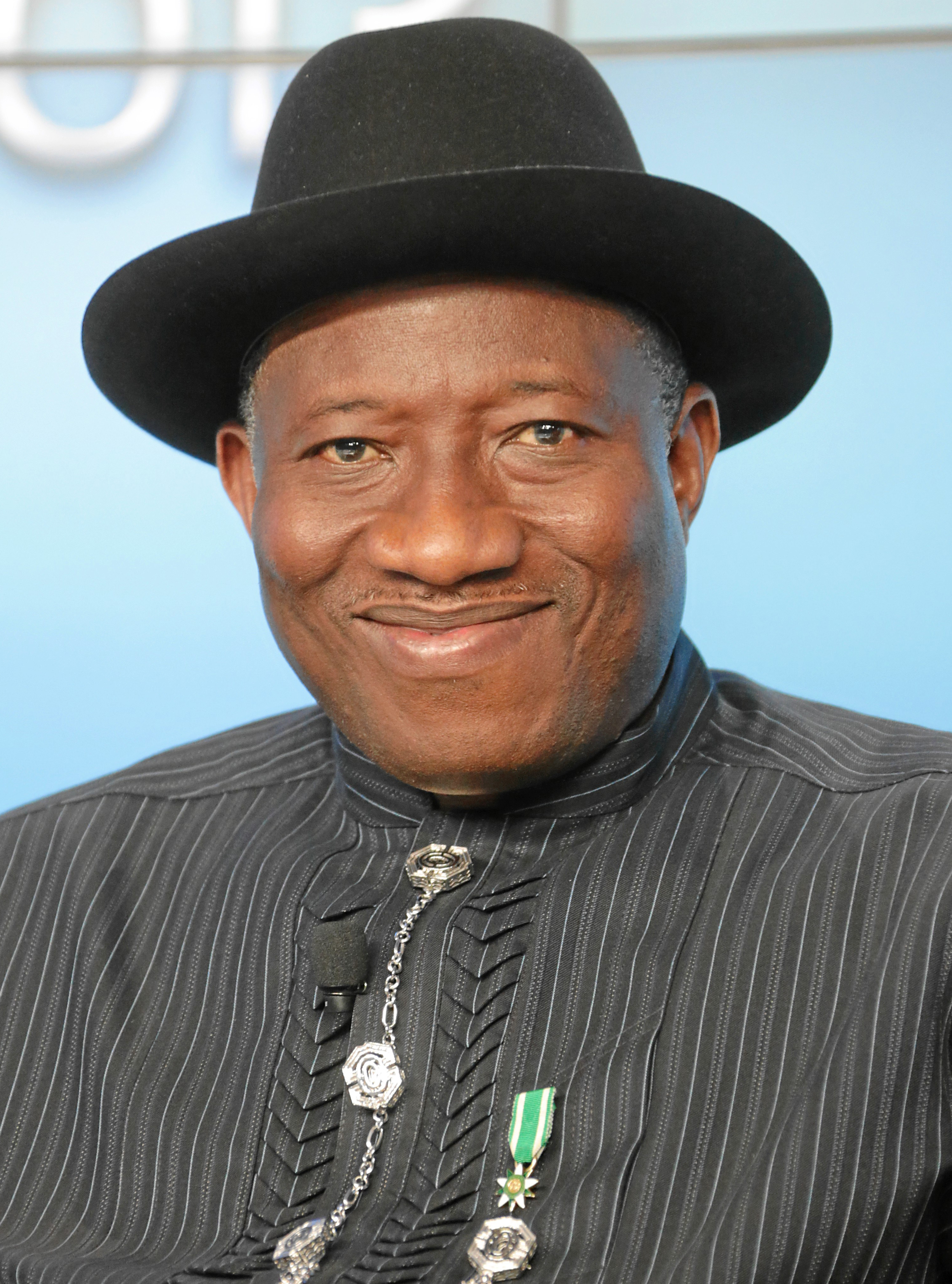
- Presidency of Goodluck Jonathan; 5 May 2010 – 29 May 2015
- Cabinet: Full list
- Party: Peoples Democratic Party
- Election: 2011
- Seat: Aso Villa
- Seal of the president

Goodluck Jonathan's tenure as the 14th president of Nigeria began on 5 May 2010 following the death of President Yar'Adua and ended on 29 May 2015. He had been vice president for 1072 days when he succeeded to the presidency. A member of the Peoples Democratic Party from Bayelsa State, he ran for and won a full four-year term in the 2011 election, winning in a landslide over retired general Muhammadu Buhari of the Congress for Progressive Change. His presidency ended with defeat in the 2015 presidential election to the All Progressives Congress candidate, General Buhari after one full four-year term in office.

== Personnel ==
- Chief of Staff - Mike Ogidamohe
  - Principal Private Secretary - Ambassador Hassan Ardo Tukur
- National Security Adviser - Sambo Dasuki
- Secretary to the Government - Anyim Pius Anyim
- Head of Civil Service - Bello Sali

== Economic policy ==
The Jonathan Administration launched the Transformation Agenda which was designed to improve the productive capacity of the Nigerian economy by increasing the level of human capital development/accumulation.

=== SURE-P ===
Upon the partial removal of petrol subsidies, the Jonathan administration instituted a subsidy re-investment programme designed to spend the money saved from partial petrol price deregulation on physical infrastructure across the country. The SURE-P was also intended to improve maternal health and reduce maternal mortality.

List of presidents of Nigeria
Preceded by Yar'Adua	Presidency of Goodluck Jonathan; 2010–2015	Succeeded by Buhari
