= Eagle Square, Abuja =

Public square in Abuja

Coordinates: 9°14′05″N 7°29′26″E

Eagle Square
- Public square
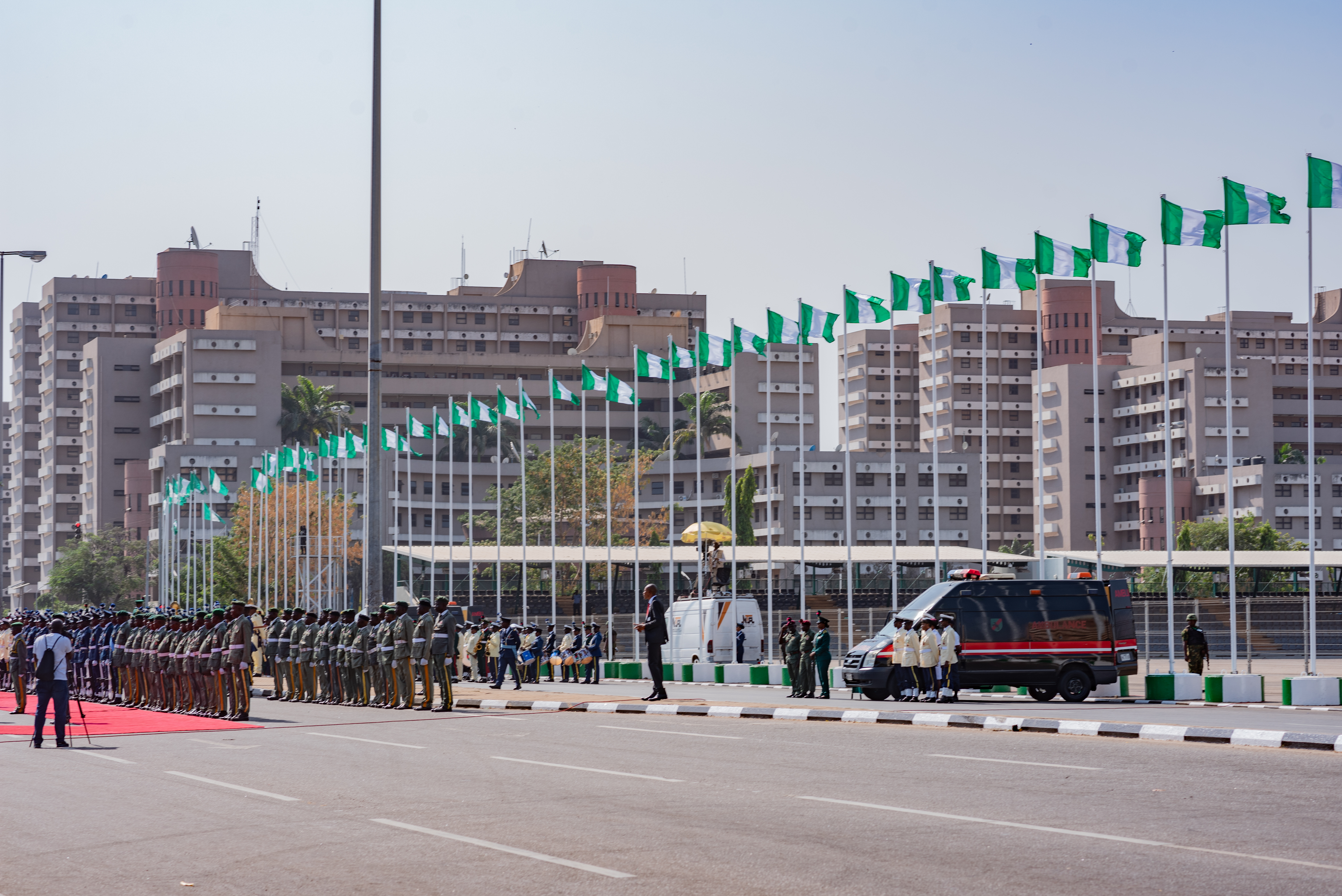
- The rear of the square
- Area: 11 hectares (27 acres)
- Owner: Federal Capital Territory
- Location: Shehu Shagari Way, Central Business District, Abuja, Federal Capital Territory, Nigeria.
- Interactive map of Eagle Square

Eagle Square is the main square in Abuja, the capital of the Federal Republic of Nigeria. It is located between the Head of Service and the Federal Secretariat buildings in the Central Business District of Abuja. It is located where the Central Park was proposed and has an adjoining National Arcade, which juts into The Three Arms Zone through the Democracy Avenue, overlooking the National Assembly Complex and the Aso Rock The square was constructed in 1999 to serve as the central area for seats of power in Nigeria.

== History ==
The square was constructed in 1999 to serve as the place "where city inhabitants gather to pay respect to authorities as it is meant to serve a public institution rather than the public." The total cost of Eagle Square was increased by 14% before the completion of the project.

== Usage ==
=== Protests and rallies ===
In January 2012, the Occupy Nigeria protest took place on the square. Political rallies are frequently held there, including the International Workers' Day (May 1) as well as ones held by the regime of General Sani Abacha.

=== National Ceremonies ===
Eagle Square is used as the main venue for the Independence Day and Armed Forces Remembrance Day parade as well as the presidential inauguration of the President of Nigeria. Since its completion, it has also hosted a number of political rallies, religious programmes, musical concerts, and award ceremonies. On 27 April 2023, the Nigerian Army conducted the largest Presentation of Colours in the Commonwealth on Eagle Square, issuing 53 new colors to preexisting units an 28 colors to newly established units 81 colours being issued).

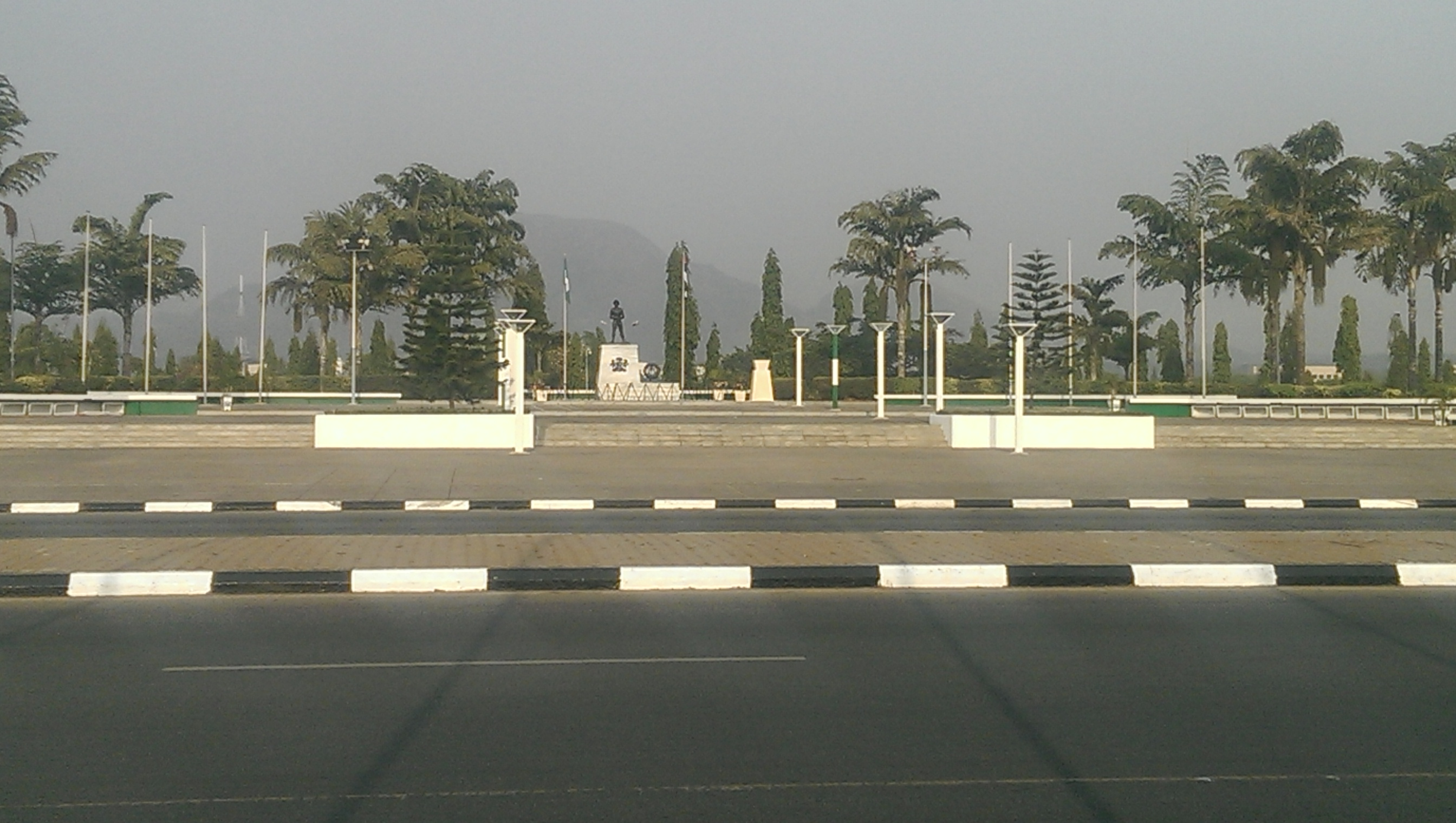
National Arcade (Tomb of the Unknown Soldier)

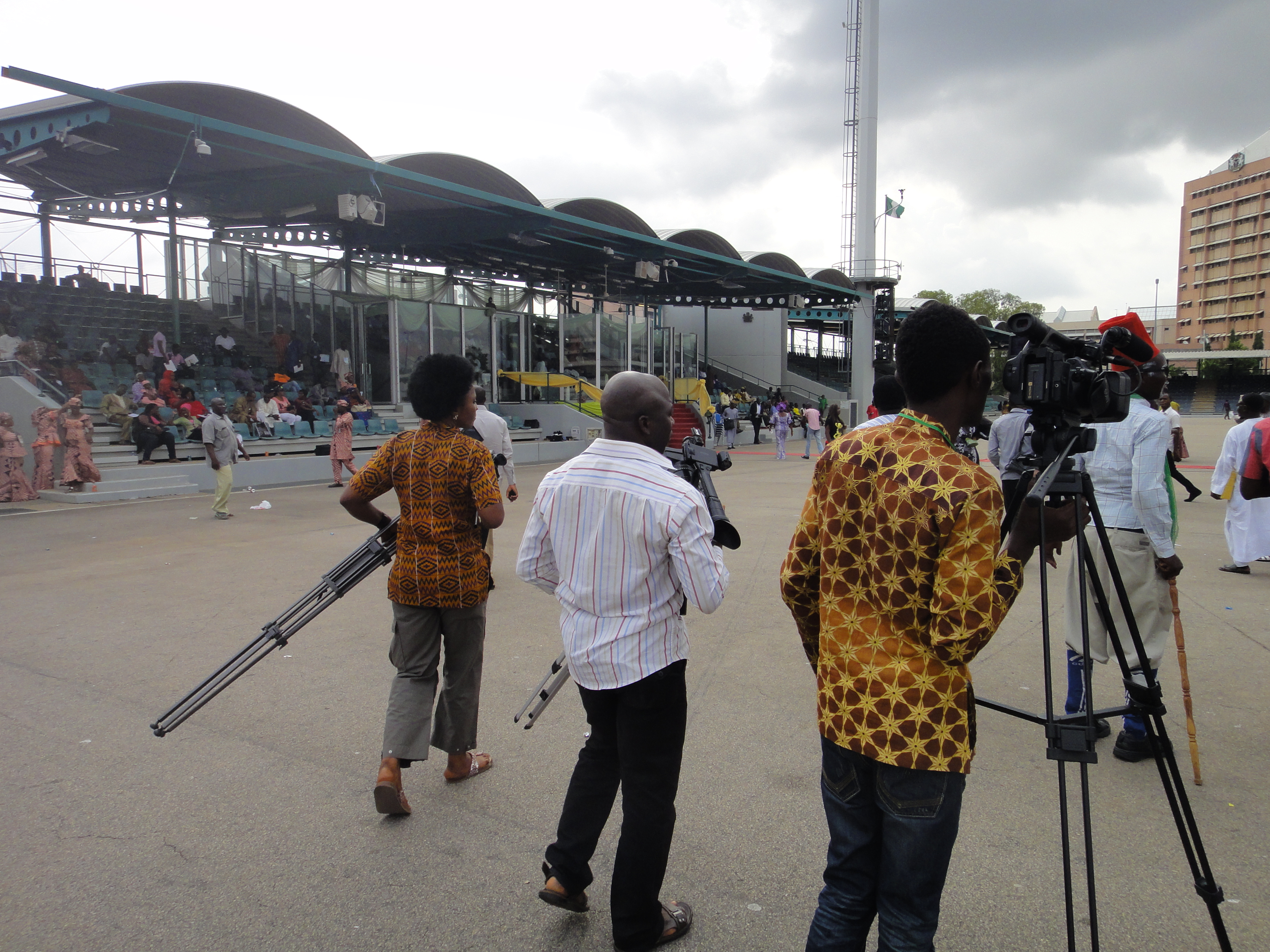
Photojournalist at the Eagle Square

=== Others ===
On some rare occasions Eagle Square has been used for national prayers.

== Landmarks and facilities ==
=== Arena ===
Facilities in the Eagle Square include a VIP pavilion and a 5,300-seat capacity arena for the hosting of state functions. It was designed and constructed in a few months by a company better known for road works.

=== National Arcade ===
The square is directly across from the National Arcade, also called Tomb of the Unknown Soldier. At the Tomb of the Unknown Soldier, in the adjoining National Arcade, a sentry guard from the Brigade of Guards keeps watch 24 hours with a ceremonial change of guards.

=== Others ===
Eagle Square is conveniently located near major government buildings and landmarks within Abuja.

- Abuja International Conference Centre
- Federal Secretariat
- National Assembly
- Supreme Court

== See also ==
- Inauguration of Muhammadu Buhari
- Aso Villa
