= Kaduna Mafia =

Loose group of businessmen and military officers in Kaduna, Nigeria

- Founded: 1966
- Founding location: Kaduna, Northern Nigeria
- Years active: 20th century–present
- Ethnicity: Hausa–Fulani, Kanuri, other regional minorities
- Membership: Unknown

The Kaduna Mafia (not a criminal organisation) is a loose group of Nigerian businessmen, civil servants, intellectuals and military officers from Northern Nigeria, who resided or conducted their activities in Kaduna, the former capital of the region towards the end of the First Republic.

Similar to the Sicilian Mafia, the group shares features of omertà, ethnicity, and patronage. It is believed the resentment of competing interests led to the creation of the acerbic idea of a clique gaining headway through its closeness to power and thereby approximating resources of the state under the banner of capitalism.

== Usage of the term Mafia ==
The term Kaduna Mafia was supposedly popularised by journalist Mvendaga Jibo.

== History ==
=== Context ===
The challenges to Ahmadu Bello of the transition from colonial rule to self-government laid in his role as a member of the traditional ruling establishment. He was confronted with either maintaining the caliphal structures under British rule or modernise administrative structures of the traditional institutions to provide them with power of utility. It is argued that the introduction of reforms of the institutions saved them from withering away. Traditional authority has continued to play a central role in Northern society since the time of Ahmadu Bello, despite continuing reforms.

The creation of the civil service during the period of Ahmadu Bello is one of his major achievements. He regarded the northern civil service as a meritocracy, which should be above petty political quarrels, and certainly above corruption. The civil service had a rigorous code of ethics, and came to serve as a counterbalance to both politicians and traditional leaders. The trans-ethnic nature of the civil service provided the backbone for Northern Regionalism and for northern development efforts, which were based on the principle of equal distribution of opportunities. The technical and administrative skills of the civil service were essential to a large-scale political community, and the willingness to take assignments outside of the capital city was part of the ethos. The civil service provided a smooth transition from colonial rule to Independence, and an equally smooth transition from Northern Regionalism to the creation of states and the consolidation of Nigerian federalism. Perhaps the key to the effective functioning of the civil service was its apparent balance in terms of sub-regional zones, its transcendence of sub-regional interests, and its ability to incorporate intergenerational cohorts into a cohesive whole. His insistence that the next generation of traditional leaders be western educated set the stage for the transition to their subsequent roles.

The first generation of northern civil servants (i.e. those born in the decade from about 1910–1920: Tafawa Balewa, Yahaya Madawaki, Isa Kaita, Abubakar Imam) tended to be cohorts from Katsina College, and had good personal relationships with their colleagues (including Ahmadu Bello) who had gone into political life.

The second generation of northern civil servants (i.e. those born from 1920 to 1930, and reaching senior status in the service during the transition to independence such as – Mohammed Bello, Muhammadu Dikko Yusufu, Hassan Katsina) tended to have familial connections and were also part of the Katsina–Kaduna–Zaria education axis, they had close working relations with their "seniors" (the first generation) in the civil service and in the political realm.

The third generation of northern civil servants (i.e. those born from 1930 to 1940 and entering the senior service after independence) tended to have overseas educational experience, and there was often a sharp difference in perspective from those in the first and second generations. This generation of Northerners went on to form the core of the Kaduna Mafia.

=== Origins ===
The origins of the Kaduna mafia revolves around the fall of the First Republic. The assassination of Ahmadu Bello and other northern leaders prodded a group of young northerners to rally around and oppose the military government of General Aguiyi-Ironsi. This group, a diverse mixture of aristocrats and civil servants who were predominantly Muslim and based in Kaduna. A dichotomy exists between the traditional ruling establishment and the mafia, despite an interconnection.

This group was educated mostly in the United Kingdom, and had connections with the Ahmadu Bello University in Zaria. They were known for their intelligence, commitment to the traditional values and socio-political interests of Northern Nigeria and their internal camaraderie. Following the rise of the Second Republic members became involved in varied aspects of the Nigerian nation, they were bank directors, cabinet members, military colonels and owners of business; their main differentiating symbol metamorphosed into the prominence of economic interest as a driving factor in their activities.

=== Military era ===
The group supposedly achieved most success during the military regime of General Obasanjo, where many of its members were appointed to key positions of power and used its alliance to obtain patronage and disburse favour to friends and associates.

=== Democratic era ===
The group returned to prominence during the administration of President Umaru Musa Yar'Adua. And later in 2015, during the administration of President Muhammadu Buhari.

== List of notable members ==
- Abba Kyari – Governor of North-Central State (1967–1974)
- Shehu Musa Yar'Adua – Chief of Staff, Supreme Headquarters (1976–1979)
- Mohammed Lawal Rafindadi – Director of the National Security Organisation (1984–1985)
- Iya Abubakar – Minister of Defence (1979–1981), Minister of Internal Affairs (1981–1982) and Senator of Nigeria (1999–2007)
- Ibrahim Tahir – Minister of Internal Affairs (Second Republic)
- Ismaila Isa Funtua – Minister of Water Resources (Second Republic)
- Adamu Ciroma – Governor of the Central Bank of Nigeria (1975–1979) and Minister of Finance (1999–2003)
- Sani Daura – Minister of Agriculture and Rural Development (1999–2000) and Minister of Environment (2000–2001)
- Mahmud Tukur – Vice Chancellor of Bayero University Kano (1975–1977) and Minister of Commerce and Industry (1984–1985)
- Mamman Daura – editor of the New Nigerian (1969–1975), Chairman of Nigerian Television Authority (1984–1985), former board director and chairman of the Africa International Bank
- Hamza Rafindadi Zayyad – managing director of the Northern Nigeria Development Corporation (1976–1981)
- Ahmed Joda – permanent secretary of the Federal Ministries: Information, Education and Industries (1967–1978)
- Ibrahim Damcida – permanent secretary of the Ministry of Trade (1966–1970), permanent secretary of the Ministry of Defence (1970–1975), permanent secretary of the Ministry of Finance (1975), board director of First City Monument Bank
- Umaru Mutallab – Minister of Economic Development (1975–1976), Minister of Cooperatives and Supplies (1976–1979), managing director of United Bank for Africa (1978–1988), chairman of First Bank of Nigeria (1999–2009); and Chairman of Jaiz Bank
