= Abba Kyari =

Nigerian politician (1952–2020)

Abba Kyari CFR OON

Chief of Staff to the President
- In office 27 August 2015 – 17 April 2020
- President: Muhammadu Buhari
- Preceded by: Jones Arogbofa
- Succeeded by: Ibrahim Gambari

Personal details
- Born: 23 September 1952 Borno, Northern Region, British Nigeria (now Borno State, Nigeria)
- Died: 17 April 2020 (aged 67) Lagos, Nigeria
- Spouse: Hajiya Kulu Kyari
- Children: 4
- Education: University of Warwick; University of Cambridge; Nigerian Law School; International Institute for Management Development
- Profession: Lawyer and banker
- Awards: Order of the Niger

Abba Kyari CFR OON (23 September 1952 – 17 April 2020) was a Nigerian lawyer who served as Chief of Staff to the President of Nigeria from August 2015 to April 2020.

== Early life ==
Kyari was born on 23 September 1952, to a Shuwa Arab family from Borno. He was educated in St. Paul's College in Wusasa, Zaria, and later considered joining the Nigerian Army following advice from Mamman Daura and Ibrahim Tahir. In 1976, he met General Muhammadu Buhari who was then Governor of Borno State.

== Education ==
Kyari graduated with a bachelor's degree in sociology from the University of Warwick in 1980, and later obtained a law degree from the University of Cambridge. Kyari was called to the Nigerian Bar in 1983 after attending the Nigerian Law School. In 1984, he obtained a master's degree in law from the University of Cambridge. He later attended the International Institute for Management Development in Lausanne, Switzerland, and in 1992 and 1994 participated in the Harvard Business School's Program for Leadership Development.

== Career ==
Kyari worked for the law firm Fani-Kayode and Sowemimo for some time after his return to Nigeria.

From 1988 to 1990, he was editor with the New Africa Holdings Limited Kaduna. He was a Commissioner for Forestry and Animal Resources in Borno State in the 1990s.

From 1990 to 1995, Kyari was the secretary to the board of the African International Bank Limited, a subsidiary of Bank of Credit and Commerce International.

Kyari was an executive director in charge of management services at the United Bank for Africa, and was later appointed the chief executive officer. In 2002, he was appointed a board director of Unilever Nigeria, and later served on the board of Exxon Mobil Nigeria.

== Chief of Staff to the President ==
In August 2015, Kyari was appointed Chief of Staff to President Muhammadu Buhari. As chief of staff, he was widely considered to be the face of an infamous was that wielded high political powers in the government.

During the administration's first term, he worked mainly behind the scenes to implement the president's agenda. After Buhari won re-election in 2019, he ordered his cabinet members to channel all requests through Kyari's office — further enhancing his influence within government circles, and being labelled as the de facto head of government.

In 2017, following a leaked memo, Kyari became embroiled in a public argument with the Head of Civil Service, who was later removed from office and then arrested. In 2020, in another leaked memo, Babagana Monguno the National Security Adviser accused Kyari of meddling in matters of national security.

== Family ==
Kyari was married to the sister-in-law of Ibrahim Tahir, and had four children, Aisha, Nurudeen, Ibrahim, Zainab.

== Death ==
On 24 March 2020, it was made public that Kyari had tested positive for COVID-19 following an official trip to Germany nine days before. There were reports that he had been flown out of the country for treatment, and Reuters later reported he had "a history of medical complications, including diabetes".

On 29 March 2020, Kyari announced he was being moved from isolation in Abuja to Lagos for "preventive treatment". Kyari later died on the evening of 17 April 2020 at age 67. He was eulogised by The Economist as "a largely honourable man who went to the heart of a thoroughly corrupt and dysfunctional system, aiming to reform it—but who struggled to overcome its inertia amid a series of crises."

== Honours and awards ==
Officer of the Order of the Niger (OON)
Commander of the Order of the Federal Republic (CFR)
