= Farooq Kperogi =

Nigerian academic, columnist (born 1973)

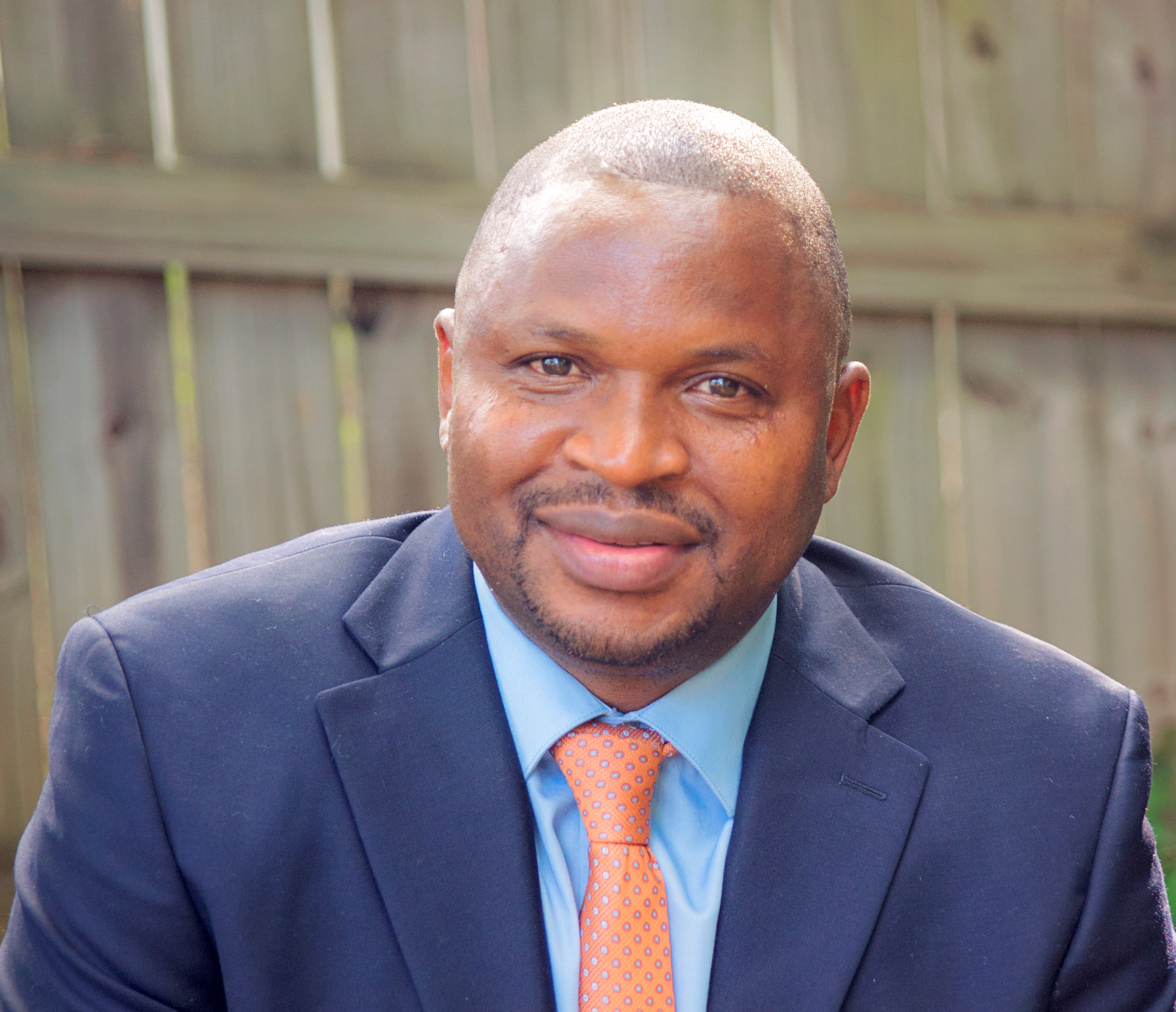
- Kperogi in 2021
- Born: March 30, 1973 (age 53); Baruten, Kwara State, Nigeria
- Occupation: Professor

Academic background
- Education: Georgia State University (Ph.D); University of Louisiana at Lafayette (M.Sc); Bayero University (B.A)
- Thesis: Webs of Resistance: The Citizen Online Journalism of the Nigerian Digital Diaspora (2011)
- Doctoral advisor: Michael L. Bruner

Academic work
- Discipline: English language, Communication, Social and Behavioral Sciences
- Sub-discipline: English usage, Media English, Nigerian English, World Englishes
- Institutions: Kennesaw State University
- Main interests: New Media, English usage, Journalese, Political criticism
- Notable works: Glocal English: The Changing Face and Forms of Nigerian English in a Global World
- Website: farooqkperogi.com

Farooq Adamu Kperogi (born 1973) is a Nigerian-American professor, author, media scholar, newspaper columnist, blogger and activist. He was a reporter and news editor at many Nigerian newspapers including the Daily Trust, Daily Triumph and the now defunct New Nigerian.

He worked as a researcher at the Presidential Research and Communications Unit in the Olusegun Obasanjo administration and had taught journalism at Ahmadu Bello University and Kaduna Polytechnic. He is a full professor of journalism and emerging media at Kennesaw State University in Georgia, United States.

He is one of Nigeria's newspaper columnists whose views are quoted by former president.

He is the author of Glocal English: The Changing Face and Forms of Nigerian English, published in 2015, as the 96th volume in series of Berkeley Insights in Linguistics and Semiotic. He is also the author of Nigeria's Digital Diaspora Citizen Media, Democracy, and Participation (University of Rochester Press, 2020) which was awarded the "2021 CHOICE Outstanding Academic Title Winner".

== Early life and education ==
Kperogi was born in 1973, in Okuta, Baruten local government area of Kwara State, Nigeria and is a member of the Bariba (Baatonu) people. He attended Bayero University between 1993 and 1997, where he received bachelor's degree in mass communication. He obtained a master's degree in communication at the University of Louisiana at Lafayette and a Ph.D. from Georgia State University in the United States in 2011.

== Later life and career ==
After graduating from Bayero University, Kano, Kperogi started working as reporter with newspapers in Katsina and Kano before joining the Media Trust as correspondent for the now defunct Weekly Trust. He also worked for the now defunct federal government-owned paper, the New Nigerian, in the early 2000s. Kperogi began his academic career between 2000 and 2002 at Kaduna Polytechnic, where he taught journalism and mass communication. He also taught at Ahmadu Bello University, Zaria for a brief time in 2004. Between 2002 and 2004, Kperogi worked in President Olusequn Obasanjo's administration as a presidential speechwriter and researcher. Kperogi writes two columns, "Politics of Grammar" and "Notes from Atlanta", for the Abuja-based Daily Trust weekend editions. Kperogi has written extensively about Nigerian English.

== Marital life ==
Farooq Kperogi is married to Maureen Erinne Kperogi with whom he has three daughters and one son.

== "Notes from Atlanta" ==
Kperogi's "Notes from Atlanta" political column in the Daily Trust was stopped in December 2018 under pressure from the president Muhammadu Buhari administration which he has been critical of in his columns and social media posts. In protest, he stopped his popular "Politics of Grammar" language column in the Daily Trust on Sunday, which he wrote for more than a decade. He has faced death threats from supporters of the Nigerian government for his critical columns and social media updates.

Kperogi's "Notes from Atlanta" column now appears every Saturday on the back page of the Nigerian Tribune, and in Peoples Gazette, an online newspaper.

== Awards and honors ==
- 2021 CHOICE Outstanding Academic Title Winner
- Department of Communication's Outstanding Alumnus Award, University of Louisiana, Lafayette, USA
- Outstanding Academic Achievement Award in Graduate Studies, Georgia State University
- Outstanding Graduate Student in Communication, University of Louisiana, Lafayette, USA
- The Nigerian Television Authority (NTA) Prize for the Best Graduating Student in Mass Communication, Bayero University, Kano

== Published work ==
- Glocal English: The Changing Face and Form of Nigerian English in Global World. New York: Peter Lang, 2015. ISBN 978-1433129261
- Nigeria's Digital Diaspora: Citizen Media, Democracy, and Participation. New York: Rochester University Press, 2020. ISBN 978-1580469821
