= Office of the President of Nigeria =

- Seal of the President of Nigeria

Agency overview
- Formed: 1 October 1963
- Jurisdiction: Federal Government of Nigeria
- Headquarters: State House, Abuja
- Agency executives: Femi Gbajabiamila, Chief of Staff; Ibrahim Hadejia, Deputy Chief of Staff and Chief of Staff to the Vice President; Temitope Fashedemi, Permanent Secretary of State House
- Website: statehouse.gov.ng

The Office of the President of Nigeria also simply known as The Presidency is the executive office of the President of Nigeria. Based at State House in Abuja, the office provides the bureaucratic and operational support required by the president to fulfill their constitutional duties as both head of state and government.

The Chief of Staff of the President, currently Femi Gbajabiamila, is appointed by the president and does not need to be approved by any other government body.

== Functions and duties ==
The Office of the President coordinates the day-to-day administrative machinery required to exercise executive power in accordance with the Constitution of Nigeria. Key institutional roles managed through this office include managing the implementation and enforcement of federal legislation enacted by the National Assembly, organizing diplomatic engagements, preparing and processing nominations for high office, and facilitating the operational schedule and policy agendas for the Federal Executive Council.

== Organization ==
=== Leadership ===
- Chief of Staff to the President
- Permanent Secretary of State House
- Principal Secretary to the President

=== Sub-offices ===
- Office of the Vice President of Nigeria
- Office of the First Lady of Nigeria

=== Departments ===
- Information and Communications Technology Department
- Finance and Account Department
- Information and Public Relations Department
- Planning, Research and Statistics Department
- Internal Audit Department
- Office of the Vice President
- Maintenance Department
- Administration Department
- State House Counsel
- State House Medical Centre
- Procurement Department
- Office of the Chief of Staff

== See also ==
- President of Nigeria
- Federal Executive Council (Nigeria)
- Chief of Staff to the President (Nigeria)
