= Zik Prize =

Award

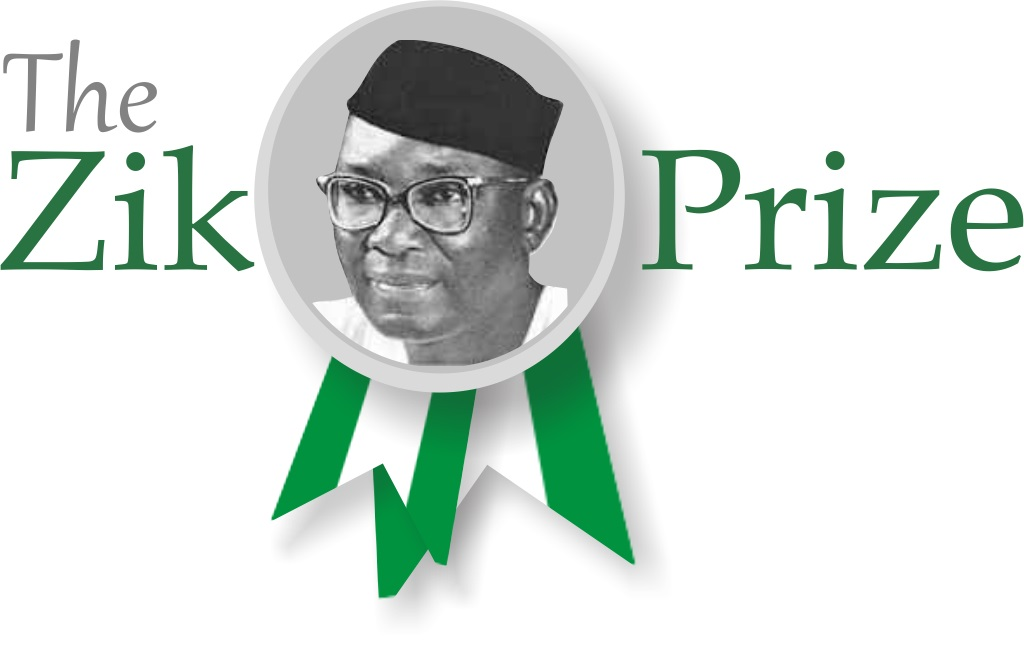
- Awarded for: Outstanding leadership, service and good governance
- Sponsored by: Federal Government of Nigeria
- Presented by: Federal Government of Nigeria
- Status: Active
- Established: 1995
- First award: 1995
- Final award: 2023

Zik Prize also known as The Nnamdi Azikiwe Prize, named after Dr. Nnamdi Azikiwe is a literally leadership award established in 1995 in honor of Azikiwe, It is awarded annually by the Federal Government of Nigeria.

== Background ==
The Zik Prize inaugural event chaired by former president of Nigeria Shehu Shagari was held on November 16, 1999 at the auditorium of the Nigerian Law School in Lagos. The 1996 edition of the award was cancelled due to the death of Azikiwe who died in May 1996 at the University of Nigeria Teaching Hospital in Enugu. The Inaugural awardee of the Prize includes Jerry Rawlings of Ghana, Akintola Williams and Abdulazeez Udeh of Nigeria.

== Categories ==
- Political Leadership
- Good Governance
- Professional Leadership
- Business Leadership
- Humanitarian Leadership
- Public Service

== Recipients ==
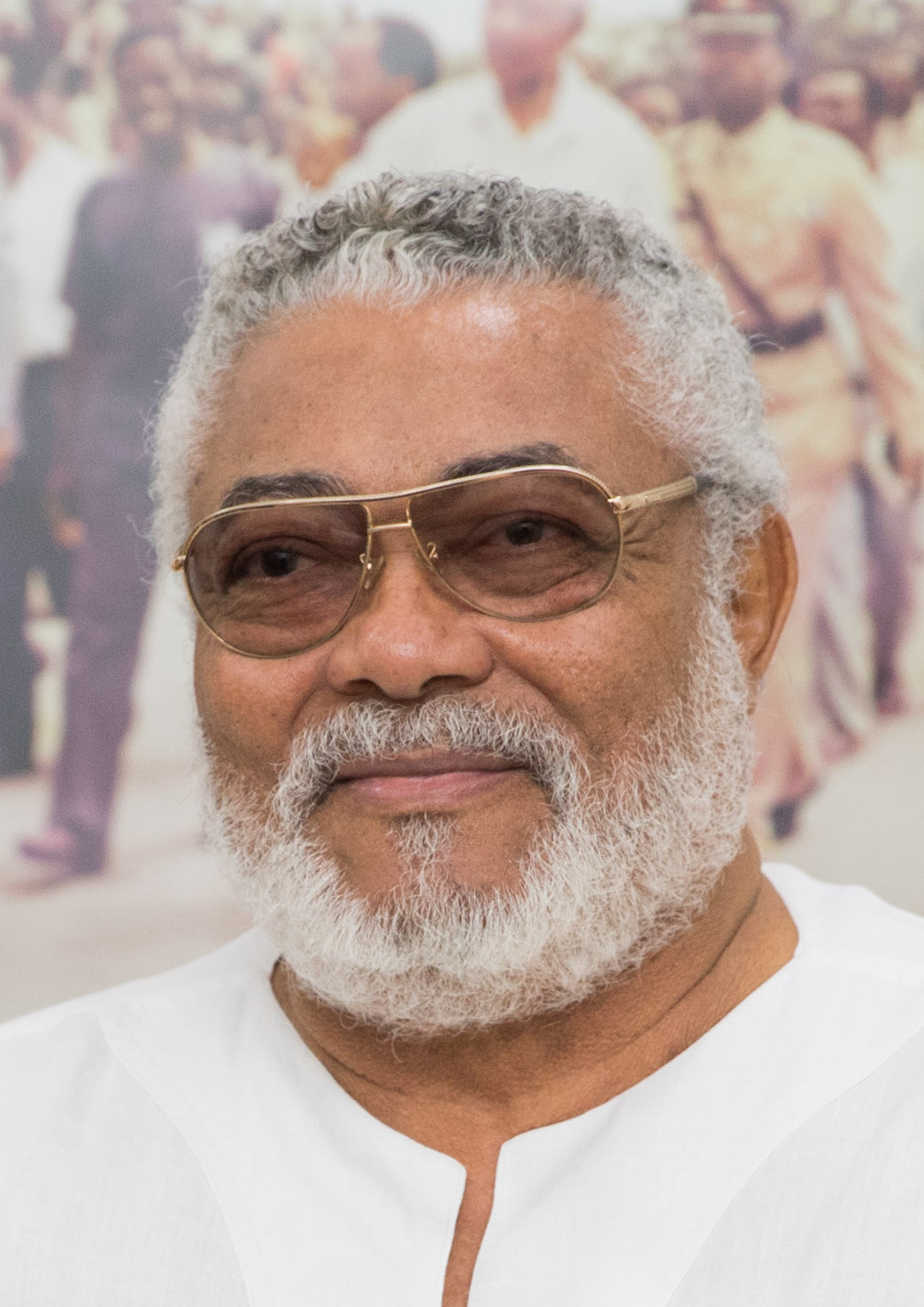
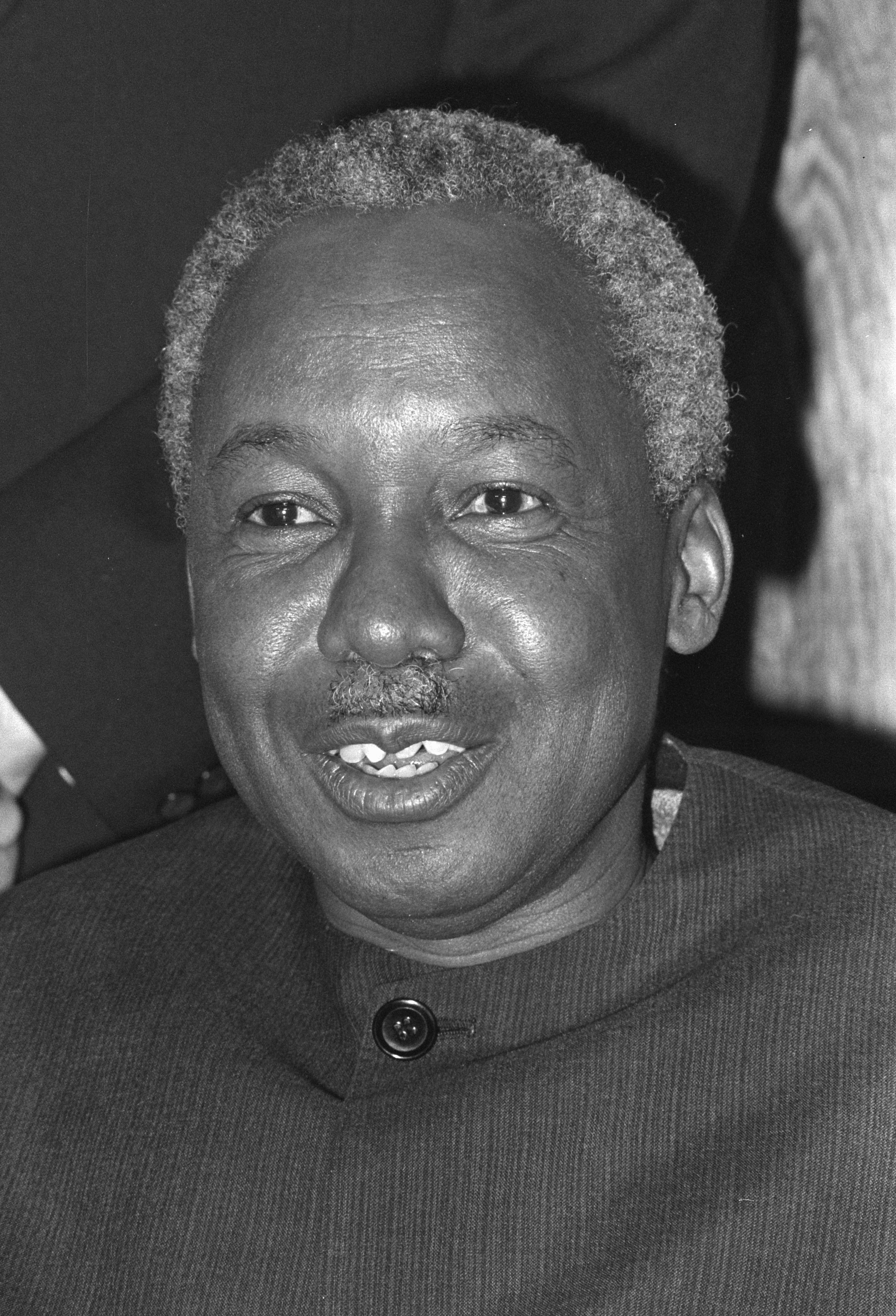
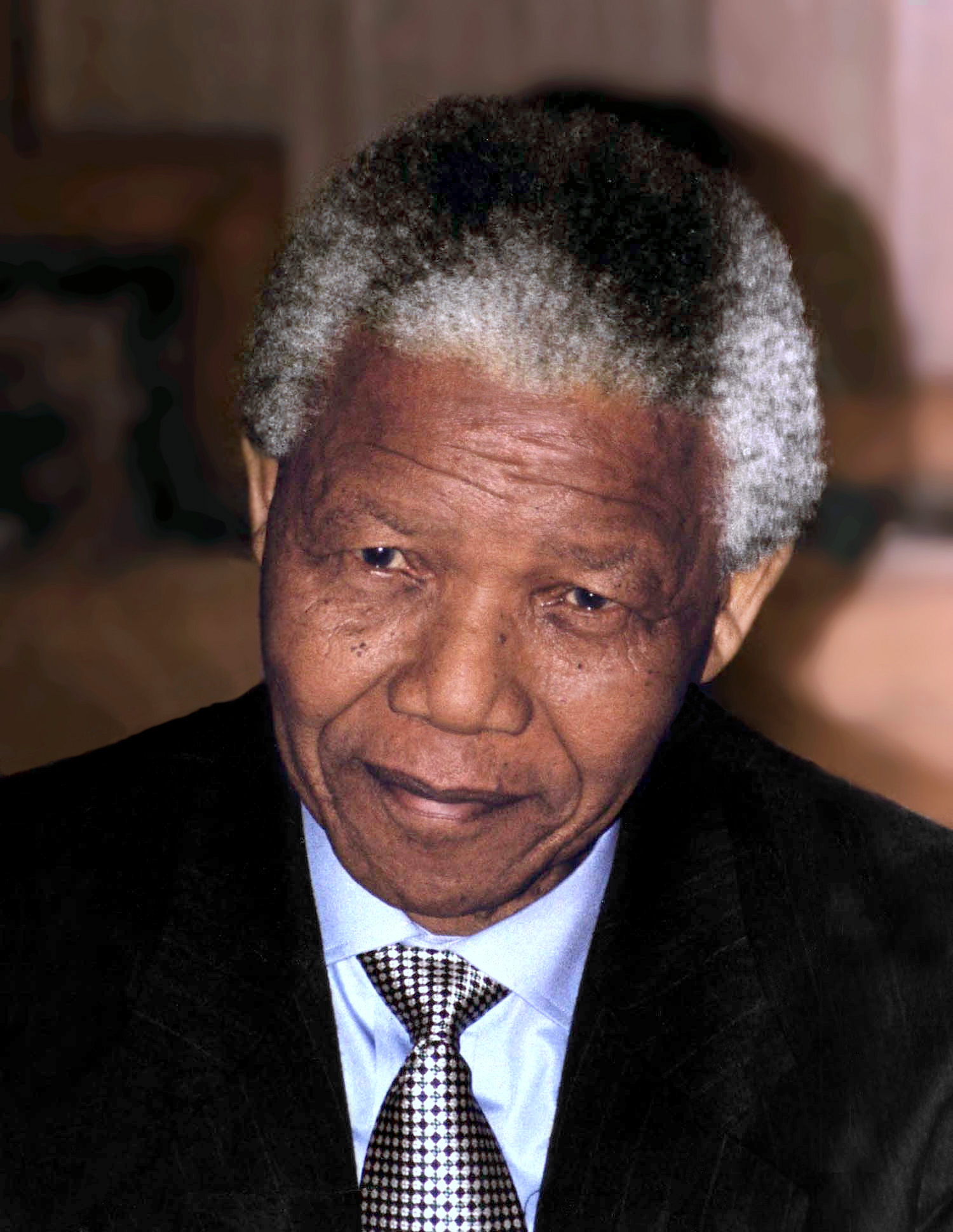
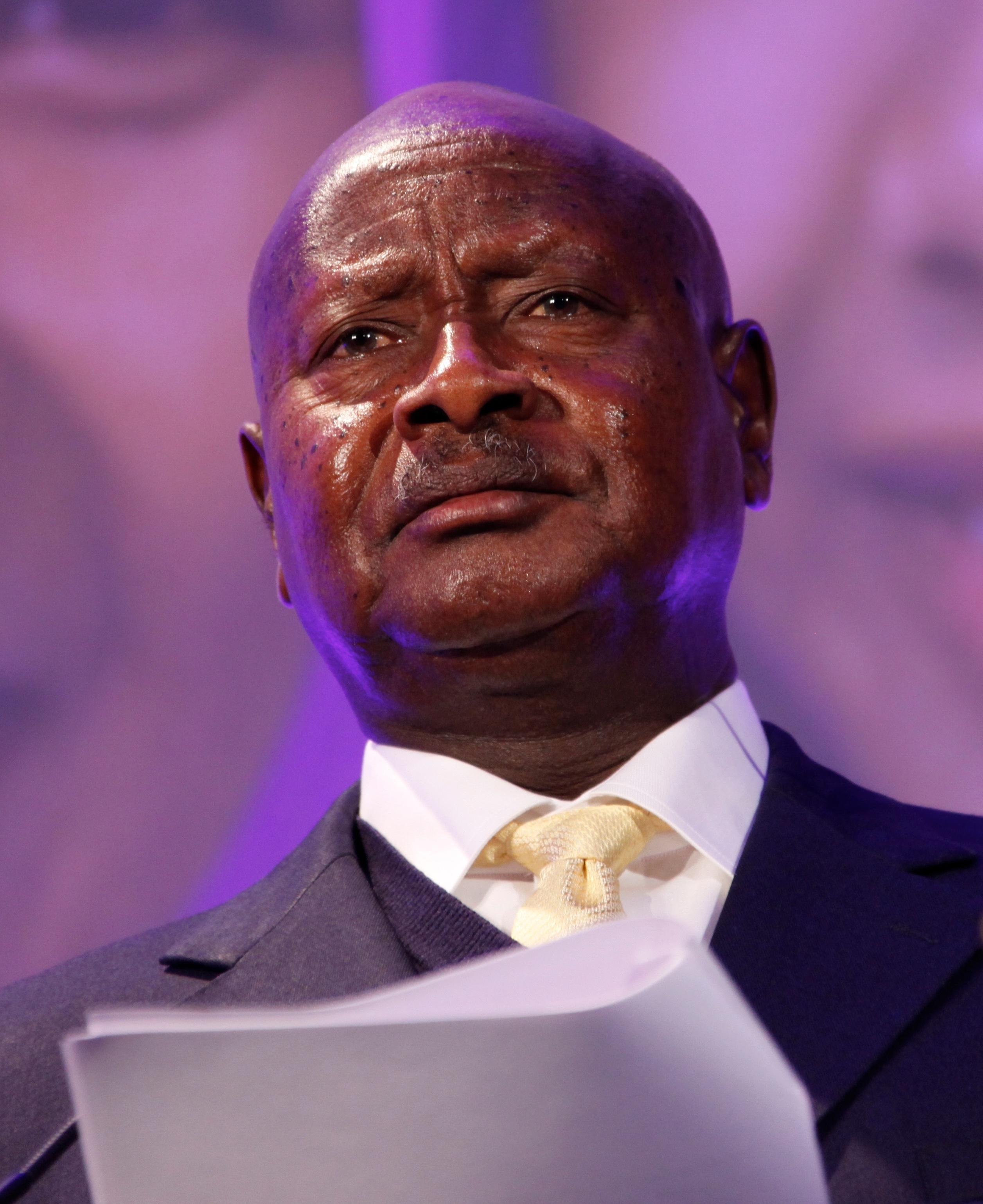
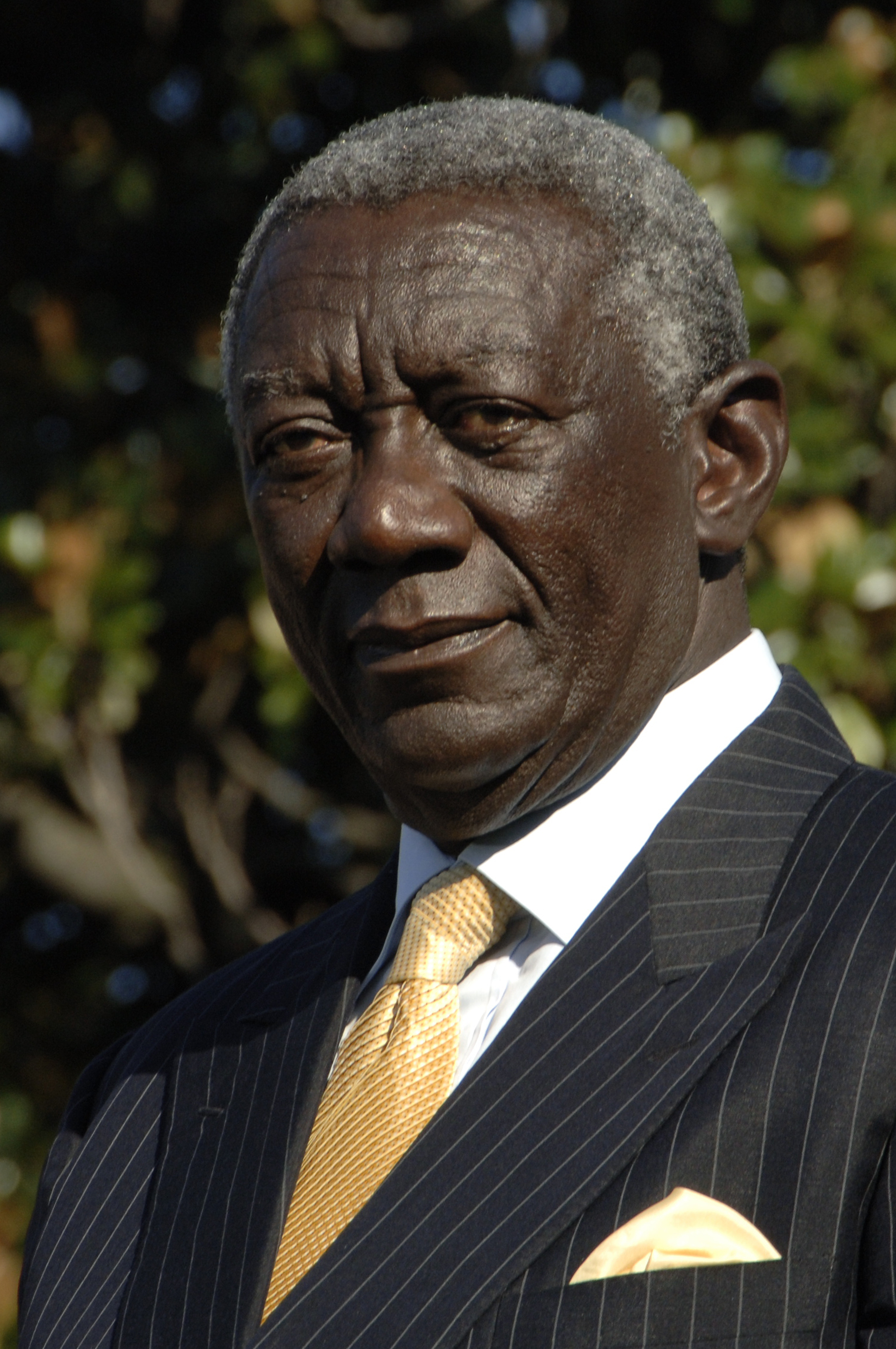
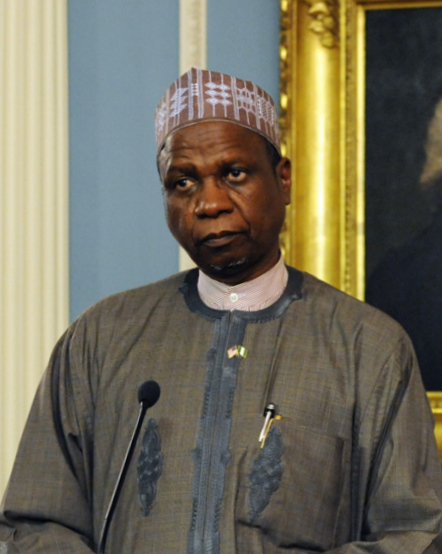
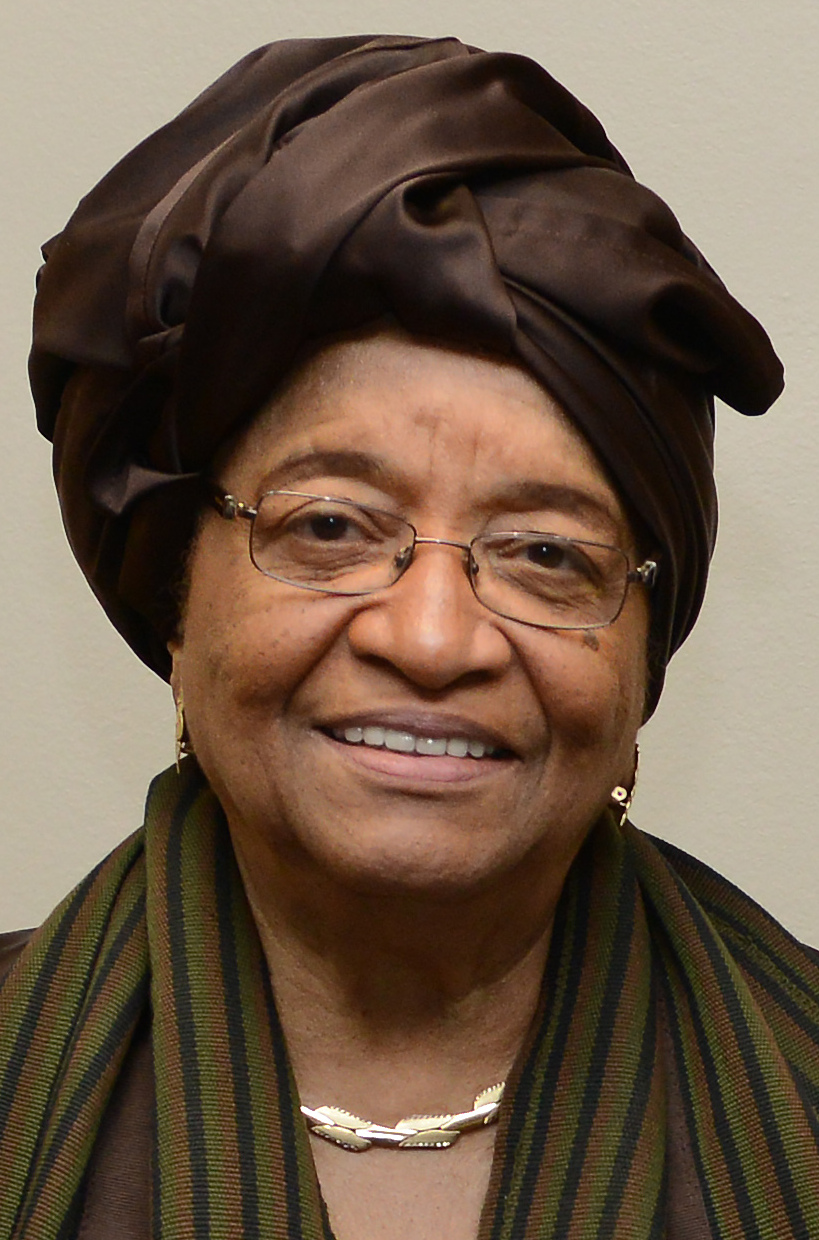
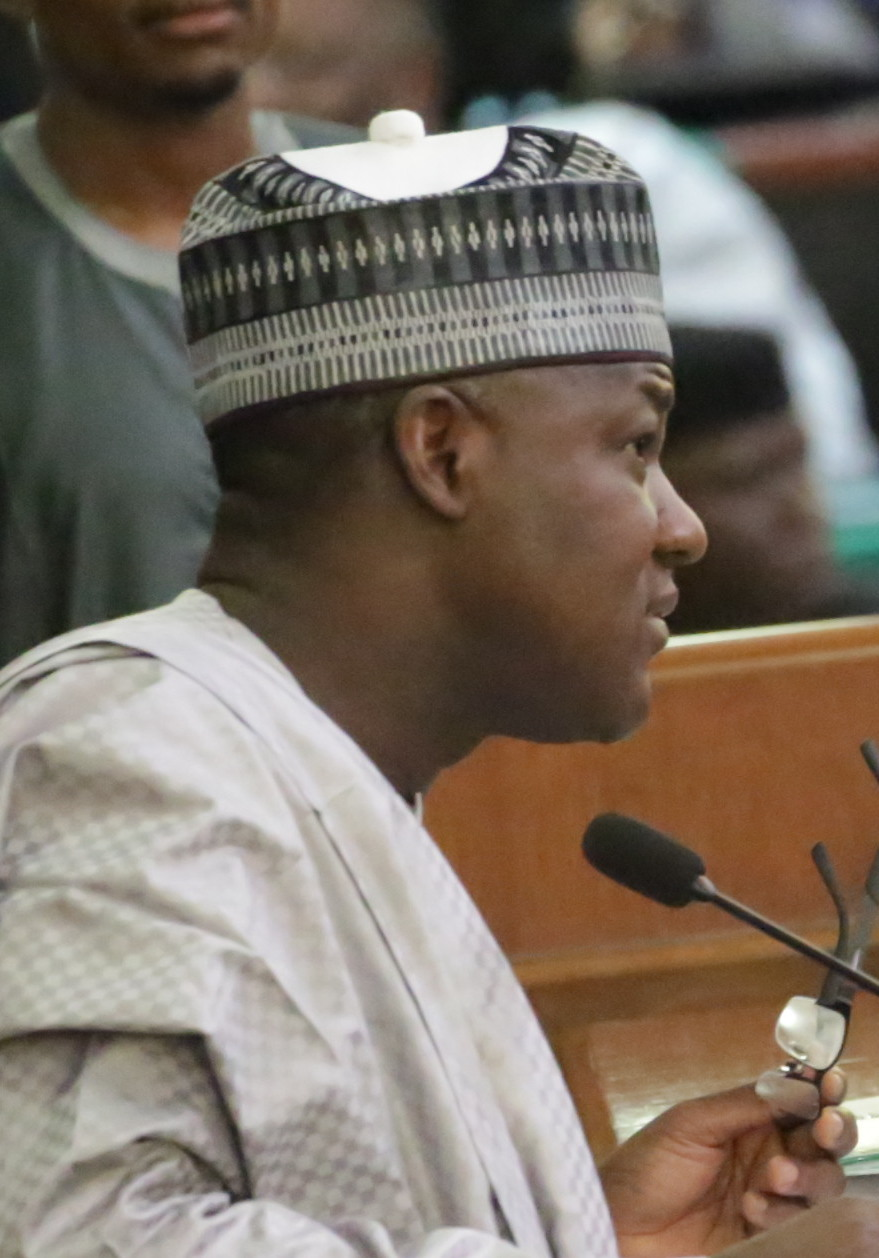
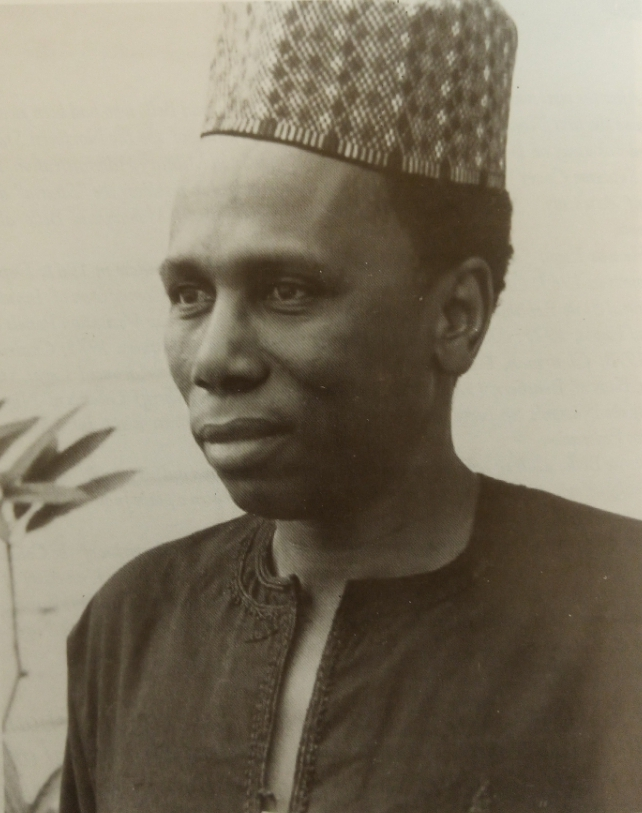
No	Year	Recipient	Image	Birth/death	Country	Description
1	1995	Jerry Rawlings		1947-2020	Ghana	Former leader of Ghana
1	1995	Akintola Williams		1919-2023	Nigeria	First Nigerian to qualify as a chartered accountant
1	1995	Abdulazeez Udeh		1940-2021		Former publisher and financier of the Financial Post and acting Chairman of Newswatch Magazine
2	1997	Julius Nyerere		1922-1999	Tanzania	Former prime minister and president of Tanzania
3	2000	Nelson Mandela		1918-2013	South Africa	Anti-apartheid activist and former president of South Africa
4	2003	Yoweri Museveni		b. 1944	Uganda	Ugandan politician who has been the ninth President of Uganda since 1986
5	2008	John Kufuor		b. 1938	Ghana	President of Ghana from 7 January 2001 to 7 January 2009, and Chairperson of the African Union from 2007 to 2008
6	2010	Ayale Ahmed		b. 1952	Nigeria	Nigerian civil servant and politician who served as Defence Minister of Nigeria from July 2007 to September 2008 and Secretary to the Government of the Federation from September 2008 to May 2011
7	2011	Ellen Johnson Sirleaf		b. 1938	Liberia	First elected female head of state in Africa who served as the 24th president of Liberia from 2006 to 2018
8	2013	Aare Afe Babalola		b. 1929	Nigeria	Nigerian lawyer who founded the Afe Babalola University in Ado Ekiti
9	2015	Yakubu Dogara		b. 1967	Nigeria	Nigerian politician and lawyer who served as the 13th Speaker of the House of Representatives of Nigeria from 2015 to 2019
10	2016	Ahmed Joda		1930-2021	Nigeria	Nigerian administrator
11	2017	Audu Ogbeh		b. 1947	Nigeria	Nigerian farmer, playwright and politician who served as the minister of agriculture and rural development from 2015 to 2019.
12	2018	Oyewusi Ibidapo-Obe		1949-2021	Nigeria	Nigerian professor and former vice chancellor of the University of Lagos
