= Ibrahim Damcida =

Nigerian civil servant

Ibrahim Damcida (1933–2012) was a Nigerian administrator who rose through the administrative cadre of the Northern regional government and then the federal civil service to retire as Permanent Secretary, Ministry of Finance. During the administration of the youthful Yakubu Gowon, he was considered to among a group known as super Permanent Secretaries.

Damcida and many civil service officers were retired in 1975 after a change in government. He died in the crash of Dana Air Flight 0992 when the airplane he was travelling in crashed into some buildings in Lagos killing everyone onboard the airplane.

== Life ==
Damcida was born in Biu, Borno State, the son of Yerima Damcida, from a ruling family of Biu Emirate. His grandfather was Mai of Biu as was his uncle, Ali Gurgur. Alhaji Ibrahim Maina Damcida was a prince of the Biu Emirate, born in Biu Local Government Area, Borno State in 1933. He attended Biu Central Primary School, from 1939 - 1943, Maiduguri Middle School from 1944 – 1946, before proceeding to Kaduna College and the famous Barewa College for secondary school education, which he completed in 1950. Upon completion of his studies at Barewa College, he furthered his education at Westminster College, London, United Kingdom, where he studied Accounting between 1954 – 1956, and then later to Northwestern Polytechnic London, United Kingdom between 1956 – 1958. He began his career as manager in training at John Holt Plc, learning about the business in different branches across the country. Thereafter, he trained as an accountant, in 1959, he transferred services to the regional government and in 1962, he transferred to the federal civil service to work as under-secretary in the Ministry of Industries. Before his retirement, Damcida served as deputy Permanent Secretary or Permanent Secretary in the Ministries of Industries, Trade, Defense and Finance

=== Career in the civil service ===
He was seconded to the Federal Civil Service in 1962, where he was posted to the Federal Ministry of Commerce and Industries as a Deputy Permanent Secretary from 1962 - 1965, then later transferred to the Federal Ministry of Finance, to serve as a Deputy Permanent Secretary from 1965 – 1966, before being promoted to a substantive Permanent Secretary position and posted to the Federal Ministry of Trade in 1966. In 1965, he was at the Economic Development Institute of the World Bank in Washington DC, USA and remained a Fellow of this Institution even after his retirement. Damcida was an ace in his field of work and that earned him and a few of his fellow Permanent Secretaries a reward for good service, exemplary leadership and commitments to nation building.

Damcida, remained a Permanent Secretary in the Federal Ministry of Trade from 1966, up until 1971, when he was transferred to the Federal Ministry of Defense as Permanent Secretary, until 1976 when he was retired along with his other colleagues, after a change of Military Government that year. In 1968 as the Permanent Secretary in the Ministry of Trade he was actively involved in the establishment and funding of NICON, a national insurance company.

After the end of the civil war, a title that could be considered both descriptive and insulting was linked to a group of administrators. An editor of the Daily Times, Babatunde Jose tagged a group of administrators which included Damcida and others such as Yusuf Gobir, Ahmed Joda, Phillip Asiodu and Allison Ayide as 'super Permanent Secretaries'. Jose has criticized a move by the Yakubu Gowon led government to increase the salaries of some permanent secretaries whose performance impressed Gowon during a political crisis between 1966 and 1967 and the civil war between 1967 and 1970. Jose critiqued the increase as excessive after the country had just gone through a civil war and coined the term super permanent secretary for the beneficiaries of the salary increase.

In 1971, he was the Permanent Secretary, Ministry of Defense and became friends with officers such as Murtala Mohammed and Olusegun Obasanjo, two future leaders that later embarked on mass retrenchment that included the retirement of Damcida.

In the 1970s, Nigeria began to implement a construction plan to build military barracks across the country to accommodate personnel expansion during the civil war. However, there was a gap in domestic cement production and domestic consumption because two of the nation's cement plants were affected by the war. The defense ministry with Damcida as secretary approved a plan to import cement up to 2.9 million tonnes a year, contracts were awarded in tranches of 240,000 tonnes per contractor. Sixty nine tranches were awarded, in excess of need but done to ensure delivery of cement on time. The importation of the product resulted in the congestion of the Lagos port and government incurring payment of demurrage charges as a stipulated in the contract signed. This event caught international attention as the cement armada in Lagos.

=== Private Sector Career ===
Damcida transitioned back into the Private Sector a few years after a successful Civil Service career, through tapping into his network of already established contacts and school relationships. This level of transition, saw him collaborate to build businesses across Banking, Telecoms, Oil and Gas, Manufacturing, Real Estate and General Merchandizing.

During his lifetime, he served on the boards of several corporate and non-profit organization, among which were; LM Ericsson Nigeria Limited, FCMB Group PLC, Kewalrams Nigeria Limited, Chanrai Nigeria Limited, Dynamic Industries Limited, Trevi Foundation Limited, Afprint Nigeria PLC, Enpee Industries Limited, etc.,

He was a Fellow of the Institute of Chartered Secretaries and Administrators (ICSA), among other professional organizations and a Patron of several social and charity organizations.

=== Family ===
Damcida maintained a very quiet life. He had one (1) wife (Halima) and six (6) children (Mustapha, Ahmad, Aliyu, Ismail, Umar and Habiba).

Up until his death, he was known as a technocrat with a very distinct quality and passion for entrepreneurship, uprightness and objectivity. He was a detribalized Nigerian of high repute and a very selfless individual, always eager to contribute his quota towards the advancement of humanity.
