= Femi Gbajabiamila =

Nigerian politician and lawyer (born 1962)

The Honourable Femi Gbajabiamila CFR
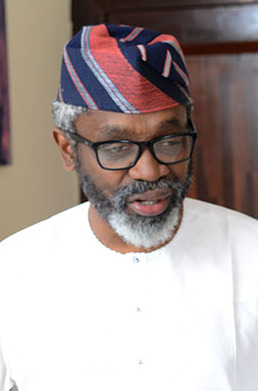

Chief of Staff to the President
- Incumbent
- Assumed office 14 June 2023
- President: Bola Tinubu
- Deputy: Ibrahim Hadejia (Office of the Vice President)
- Preceded by: Ibrahim Gambari

14th Speaker of the House of Representatives of Nigeria
- In office 11 June 2019 – 11 June 2023
- Deputy: Ahmed Idris Wase
- Preceded by: Yakubu Dogara
- Succeeded by: Tajudeen Abbas

House Majority Leader
- In office 9 June 2015 – 9 June 2019
- Preceded by: Ogor Okuweh
- Succeeded by: Alhassan Doguwa

House Minority Leader
- In office 5 June 2007 – 6 June 2015
- Preceded by: Ahmed Salik
- Succeeded by: Ogor Okuweh

Member of the House of Representatives of Nigeria from Lagos
- In office 3 June 2003 – 14 June 2023
- Constituency: Surulere I

Personal details
- Born: 25 June 1962 (age 64) Lagos, Nigeria
- Party: All Progressive Congress (2013–present)
- Other political affiliations: Alliance for Democracy (before 2006); Action Congress of Nigeria (2006–2013)
- Spouse: Salamatu Gbajabiamila
- Relations: Akbar Gbajabiamila (cousin); Kabeer Gbaja-Biamila (cousin)
- Education: Igbobi College; King William's College; University of Lagos (LL.B.); Atlanta's John Marshall Law School (JD); Brown University
- Occupation: Politician; lawyer
- Website: femigbajabiamila.com

Olufemi Hakeem Gbajabiamila CFR ( born 25 June 1962), is a Nigerian lawyer and politician, who has served as Chief of Staff to the President of Nigeria since 2023. He previously served as the 14th Speaker of the House of Representatives of Nigeria from 2019 to 2023.

== Early life and education ==
Olufemi "Femi" Hakeem Gbajabiamila was born on 25 June 1962, to Lateef Gbajabiamila and Olufunke Gbajabiamila in Lagos, Nigeria. He attended Mainland Preparatory School for elementary education and proceeded to Igbobi College in 1973, where he completed his secondary education. Subsequently, he enrolled at King William's College on the Isle of Man, United Kingdom, for his A-Level. He was accepted into the University of Lagos, Nigeria. He graduated with a Bachelor of Law (LL.B.) with honours in 1983 and was called to the Nigerian bar in 1984.

He first worked for the law firm, Bentley Edu & Co. in Lagos, before establishing his own law firm, Femi Gbaja & Co. He then earned his Juris Doctor from Atlanta's John Marshall Law School in Georgia, USA, passed the Georgian bar exam in 2001, and set up a law firm in Atlanta. While in the US, he actively participated in the election of Bill Campbell who later went on to become Mayor of Atlanta.

== Political career ==
Gbajabiamila was first elected to the House of Representatives in 2003, representing the Surulere I constituency of Lagos State. He was re-elected and served for six consecutive terms.

Gbajabiamila criticized members of the National Assembly for switching parties. He suggested that many voters don't have access to the information to make choices based on every individual's stance and therefore sometimes vote for candidates based on their party alignment. He criticized floppers with this in mind, saying the effect "cannot be anything but negative".

Gbajabiamila was the Minority Leader of the House of Representatives in the 7th National Assembly.

Gbajabiamila was head of the House of Representatives ad hoc committee investigating claims by the Asset Management Company of Nigeria (AMCON) about the 140.9 billion naira (about $1 billion) debt owed by 'Zenon Petroleum & Gas Limited' and 'Forte Oil Plc'. The call for an investigation of the reported payment was made by another lawmaker, Bimbo Daramola who moved the motion that the House set up a panel to verify the claims by AMCON that the two Femi Otedola-owned companies have paid back the money that the government of Nigeria paid for petroleum products that were reportedly not delivered as agreed upon by the dictates of the government's fuel subsidy scheme. Bimbo Daramola had suspected that the payment, if truly made, was "shrouded in secrecy."

Gbajabiamila was elected speaker in the 9th National Assembly House of Representatives with 283 votes, while his opponent Mohammed Umar Bago came in second with 78 votes.

In the House, Gbajabiamila demonstrated a passionate concern for issues relevant to his constituents and Nigeria as a whole.

After 10 years, he resigned as a Speaker of the House of Representatives on 14 June 2023 to assume office as Chief of Staff to President Bola Tinubu.

== Fraud and Corruption ==
In 2007, Femi Gbajabiamila, practising in the State Bar of Georgia under the name 'Femi Gbaja' and with state bar number 288330, was found guilty after admitting to stealing $25,000 from his client. He was suspended by the Supreme Court of Georgia in a panel led by Chief Justice Leah Ward Sears for 36 months.

== Awards ==
In October 2022, the Nigerian national honour of Commander of the Order of the Federal Republic (CFR) was conferred on him by President Muhammadu Buhari.
