= Mamman Daura =

Nigerian journalist (born 1939)

Mamman Daura CON CFR
- Born: 1939 (age 86–87)
- Education: Trinity College Dublin
- Occupation: Newspaper editor
- Known for: Leading Kaduna Mafia

Mamman Daura CON CFR (born 1939) is a Nigerian newspaper editor who edited and later managed the New Nigerian from 1969 to 1975. He is a nephew of President Muhammadu Buhari; and a prominent member of the infamous Kaduna Mafia, a loose group of Nigerian businessmen, civil servants, intellectuals and military officers from Northern Nigeria.

== Life ==
Mamman Daura was born in Daura, Northern Region, British Nigeria in 1939, his father Alhaji Dauda Daura held the traditional title of Durbin Daura of the Daura Emirate; and was Muhammadu Buhari's elder brother. He was educated at Daura Elementary School, Katsina Middle School before attending Provincial Secondary School, Okene. In 1956, at the age of 17, he started working with the Daura Native Authority for a couple of years before joining the Nigerian Broadcasting Corporation. He was one of six northerners selected by Sir Ahmadu Bello to study in England.

From 1962 to 1967, he read economics and politics at Trinity College, Dublin. On his return in 1967, he spent a year as an assistant in the Cabinet of Northern Nigeria, before returning to Dublin for a master's degree in business and public administration. In 1968, Adamu Ciroma, editor of the New Nigerian was looking to recruit qualified and educated northern Nigerians for the newspaper. One of those recruits was Daura who was just finishing his master's degree in Dublin. Daura was hesitant to take the position and returned to the northern civil service as a political secretary working in the office of General Abba Kyari the military governor of North-Central State.

In April 1969, he finally joined the New Nigerian, replacing Adamu Ciroma as the paper's new editor. The first two years of his stewardship was a focus on coverage of issues affecting Northerners and protection of northern interests. In 1974, he later became the managing director of the paper's holding company. When General Murtala Mohammed's administration opted to take over the ownership of the paper, Daura soon left the company and retired into private business.

In the late 1970s, he served on several government boards and agencies including the News Agency of Nigeria; and co-founded Funtua Textiles Limited alongside Ismaila Isa Funtua. In the 1980s he was Chairman of the Nigerian Television Authority and later Africa International Bank (a subsidiary of Bank of Credit and Commerce International), he also founded a furniture factory in Kaduna and was chairman of the defunct Nigerian Bank of Commerce and Industry. Mamman, a nephew of the younger Buhari, was influential in the military government of Buhari between 1984 and 1985; and later during his administration from 2015.
