= Ibrahim Tahir =

Nigerian politician (1939–2009)

Talba Ibrahim Tahir
- Born: Ibrahim Tahir; 22 August 1939 (age 87); Tafawa Balewa, Northern Region, British Nigeria
- Died: December 8, 2009; Cairo, Egypt
- Education: BA (sociology); PhD (social anthropology); King's College, Cambridge
- Occupations: Sociologist, writer, politician
- Known for: Traditionalist conservatism
- Notable work: The Last Imam (1980)

Ibrahim Tahir (1939–2009) was a Nigerian sociologist, writer, and politician during the Second Republic and a prominent member of the Kaduna Mafia. Prior to his entry into politics, he was a sociologist who was renowned for his traditionalist conservative views.

== Life ==
Tahir was born in Tafawa Balewa, and received his early education at Kobi Primary School.

In 1954, he attended Barewa College graduating in 1958. He then proceeded to King's College, Cambridge on a regional government scholarship where he earned a bachelor's and doctoral degree in social anthropology.

In 1967, he took up appointment as a sociology lecturer at Ahmadu Bello University in Zaria. He founded the Gamji club, a social club in honour of Premier Ahmadu Bello. At the university, he was considered a foremost conservative who frequently clashed with progressives Bala Usman and Patrick Wilmot. Following the fall of the First Republic, he advocated for Northern Nigeria's core value of respect for constituted authority with progressive values of an open society. In this he shared confidence with a group of Northerners known as the Kaduna Mafia, who were intellectuals, civil servants and military officers.

In 1978, Tahir was a founding member of the National Party of Nigeria and later became the party secretary. In the Second Republic, he was appointed chairman of the Northern Nigeria Development Corporation and later became communications minister. He later participated in the National Political Reform Conference, and headed the Red Cross Society in Nigeria.

== Death ==
Tahir died on December 8, 2009, in Cairo following a protracted illness.

== Works ==
- The Last Imam (1984)
