= M. T. Usman =

Mohammed Tukur Usman (1932 - 2009) was a Nigerian government official who was permanent secretary of the Federal Ministry of Works during the Murtala Mohamed and Obasanjo administration from 1975 to 1979. He was a cousin of the Yaraduas.

== Life ==
Usman was born in Katsina where he spent most of his childhood. He finished his secondary education from Barewa College Zaria, and was in the graduation class that became the first to take General Certificate of Education examination at Barewa. After taking the exam, unlike his peers who went straight to work for the native Authorities, Usman decided to join the colonial civil service as a civil engineer. The first process of joining the service began with him taking a civil service exam in 1949, he was then accepted to study civil engineering. Between 1950 and 1953, he was in training at the Yaba polytechnic and spent other months as an apprentice under public works engineers. In 1954, he obtained a scholarship from the Northern regional government to study civil engineering at University of Sussex. After learning civil engineering skills abroad, he returned to Nigeria; Usman's first job was with the regional Ministry of Works as one of the four pioneer engineers from the region. He later was posted on secondment for three years to the Nigerian Ports Authority in Lagos and Port Harcourt. In 1968, he joined the Federal Ministry of Works

Usman rose through the ranks within the federal civil service, beginning in 1968, when he became the Chief Engineer of the Federal Ministry of Works. In 1971, he was appointed director of works and became the Permanent Secretary Ministry of Works in 1975.

Usman was Permanent Secretary when the exclusive list of roads maintained by the government increased from 11,000 km to 27,000 km. Usman recognized that there is a poor attitude towards road and building maintenance by the government, placing some blame on over protection of civil servants and shoddy work by companies lacking necessary manpower. His tenure saw the completion of the Lagos-Ibadan expressway, the Benin-Shagamu dual carriageway and the A2 road, linking Warri-Benin-Okene-Abuja-Kaduna.
