= New Nigerian =

Nigerian national newspaper

New Nigerian Newspapers
- Type: National newspaper
- Publisher: 19 Northern Governors
- Editor: Jacob Onjewu Dickson
- Language: English
- Headquarters: Kaduna, Nigeria
- Website: www.newnigeriannewspapers.ng

New Nigerian is a Nigerian newspaper based in Kaduna.

== Political allegiance ==
The newspaper was allegedly to be a linked with the Kaduna Mafia, a loose group of Nigerian businessmen, civil servants, intellectuals and military officers from Northern Nigeria.

== Editors ==
- Adamu Ciroma – 1966 to 1974
- Mamman Daura – 1969 to 1973

Jacob Onjewu Dickson 2017 till date

== General Manager (Operations) ==
- Dn. Stephen K. Vihishima – 1968 to 1988

== See also ==
- List of Nigerian newspapers
- Media of Nigeria
- Next (Nigeria)
