= Bimbo Daramola =

Nigerian politician

Member of the House of Representatives of Nigeria
- In office 2011–2015
- Constituency: Ekiti North Federal Constituency 1

Personal details
- Born: 9 November 1967 (age 58) Nigeria
- Party: All Progressives Congress (APC)
- Education: Christ's School, Ado-Ekiti

Abimbola Oluwafemi Daramola (born 9 November 1967) is a Nigerian scientist and legislator in the House of Representatives of Nigeria, representing Ekiti North Federal Constituency, Ekiti State, South-West Nigeria since 2011.

== Early life ==
Bimbo Daramola was a native of Ire Ekiti, in Oye Local Government of Ekiti State. He was born in Ado Ekiti, Ekiti State to the family of Francis Adebayo Daramola (a native of Ileku quarters of Òdò Street, Ire Ekiti), a former chairman (Mayor) of Oye Local Government Area when Oye Local Government Area was under Ondo State, out of which Ekiti State was carved in 1996 by the military government of Nigeria then headed by late General Sani Abacha. He was the last born of five boys in the family.

== Education ==
Daramola started his formal education at Emmanuel Anglican Primary School, Ado-Ekiti and St. Joseph Primary School, Aramoko-Ekiti in 1973. He had his secondary school education at Christ's School Ado Ekiti, which was founded by Archdeacon Henry Dallimore. He studied Geology in 1984 at the then Ondo State University, which was renamed to University of Ado Ekiti, and now Ekiti State University.

He graduated in 1989 and was thereafter posted to Kaduna State, North West Nigeria, where he participated in the one-year mandatory National Youth Service Corps at Water Survey (Nig) Ltd. He got his master's degree in Business Administration, at the University of Ilorin in 1995.

== Career ==
Daramola began his career with Water Survey (Nig.) Limited while on NYSC scheme in Kaduna before joining Savannah Bank in 1993 as a banker. Daramola co-founded Rucie Communications and became its Deputy managing director. The company produced a documentary, titled From Prison to Presidency, which chronicled the life, times and works of former President Olusegun Obasanjo. Daramola is the chief executive officer of The Bridge Concepts Nigeria Limited and he is the convener of One Unite Africa and the Nigeria Skit Industry Awards

== Politics ==
In 1998, Daramola met with a team of Bola Ahmed Tinubu Campaign Organization which was then responsible for campaign co-ordination of Asiwaju Bola Tinubu who was contesting for the governorship seat of Lagos State under the platform of Alliance for Democracy to canvass the use of mobile bill board for its campaign and also took his mobile billboard proposal to the campaign team of then yet-to-be-elected President Olusegun Obasanjo who was the presidential aspirant of People's Democratic Party. The team accepted his proposal and "by association," he became a member of PDP." In 2011, he was nominated by Action Congress of Nigeria to contest the seat of his constituency, Ekiti North 1 (Oye-Ikole Local Govt. Areas) Federal Constituency, which he won.

== Legislative activities ==
Daramola took oath of office as Member, House of Representatives, representing Oye/Ikole Ekiti-North Federal Constituency 1, Ekiti State, on Monday, 6 June 2011 during the inauguration of the Seventh House of Representatives. He is the Vice-Chairman of House of Representatives' Committee on Millennium Development Goals, and member of the following House of Representatives' committees: Army, Banking & Currency, Civil Society and Donor Agencies, and Diaspora. Daramola moved a motion titled Emerging Threats to Nigeria's Internal Security and the Need for the Establishment of Department of Homeland Security, to address the menace of security challenges facing Nigeria, as posed by the Boko Haram sect. Daramola moved a motion to investigate claims by the Asset Management Company of Nigeria that 140.9 billion Naira (about US$1 billion), owed by Zenon Petroleum and Gas Limited and Forte Oil Plc as a result of fuel subsidy scam had been paid. An ad hoc committee, headed by Femi Gbajabiamila to verify the repayment claims. was constituted. Daramola was appointed by the House of Representatives to head the ad hoc committee to probe the allocation of plots of land to companies and individuals in the Federal Capital Territory (FCT) and possible cases of fraud in the process from 2010 till date.

=== Table of motions moved and bills presented by Daramola ===
| S/No | Date | Title of Motion/Bill |
|---|---|---|
| 1. | 20 June 2011 | Emerging Threats to Nigeria's Internal Security and the need for the Establishment of the Department of Homeland Security |
| 2. | 6 October 2011 | Motion on the 'Urgent need to investigate the federal government's N30bn National Identity Card Scheme Project' |
| 3. | 29 February 2012 | Motion on the Utmost Disregard and violation of the rights of Nigerians by Airline Operators in Nigeria and the need to get the Airline Operators to comply with Global Standards and best practices with regard to Consumer Welfare |
| 4. | 7 March 2012 | Motion on the need to forensically review every aspect of Nigeria's relationship with South Africa, particularly our economic interest beyond the entry denial of interest 125 Nigerias' and associated immigration issues |
| 5. | 15 June 2012 | A Bill for an Act To Be Known as "Disaster Location Protection Act |
| 6. | 3 July 2012 | Presentation of National Emergency Management Agency (Establishment, etc) (Amendment) Bill |
| 7. | 14 July 2012 | Deployment of 3500 Soldiers to Edo State for the purpose of the forthcoming Gubernatorial Elections |
| 8. | 11 October 2012 | Investigation of Final Settlement of Zenon Petroleum and Gas Limited and Forte Oil Plc. outstanding debts of N140, 999, 620, 395.80 owed Assets Management Corporation of Nigeria |
| 9. | 7 November 2012 | Urgent need to remove all disused, broken-down and unserviceable aircraft from the precincts, premises and airsides of all the Airports in Nigeria. |
| 10. | 26 July 2013 | The Urgent Need to Investigate the Use of Public Funds by the Bank of Industry Under the Power and Airlines Intervention Fund |

== Comments on national issues ==
=== Fuel subsidy removal ===
During the national debate on fuel subsidy removal that eventually led to Occupy Nigeria protests, Daramola was one of Nigerian legislators invited to a meeting with Dr. Goodluck Jonathan, Nigeria's President. At the end of the meeting, Daramola said "Mr. President did not sufficiently convince me or my other colleagues in the House of Representatives. I don't want to be graphic on what happened there but I am telling you that it was a faux pax. I don't think he achieved any purpose. I don't think he moved the story forward. I would say that his reasons did not appeal to members of the House of Representatives."

=== Near crash of the Nigeria capital market ===
Daramola was a member of the second ad hoc committee mandated by the House of Representatives to investigate the near collapse of the Capital Market. Described as someone who "have an uneven temperament", he told the Deputy Governor of Central Bank of Nigeria, (CBN), Kingsley Moghalu who was trying to exonerate CBN from the financial crises that bedevilled Nigeria's finance sector, to accept blame for the "failure of institutional regulations." “The abuses took place directly under your watch. It was because you did not do your job. It is your fault; it is an institutional failure." CBN, through Moghalu had earlier blamed the near collapse of Nigeria's capital market to abuses of banks.
