= Yahaya Madawaki =

Nigerian politician

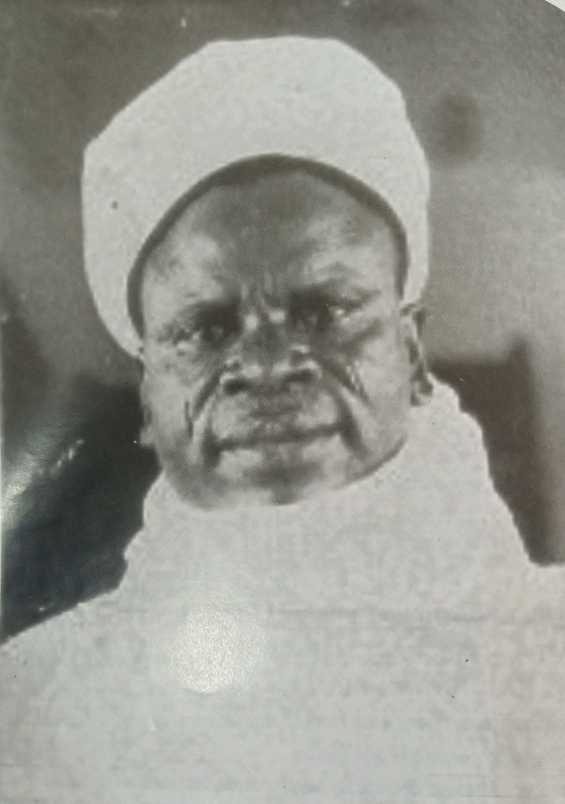

Alhaji Yahaya Madawaki, MFR, OBE, DLL and holder of King George VI Coronation Medal (January 1907 – June 5, 1998) was a prominent Nigerian politician, former Minister of Health, the Madawaki of Ilorin and the Atunluse of Erin-Ile, Kwara State.

== Early life ==
Alhaji Yahaya was born in 1907 in Ilorin, Kwara State, the oldest son of Abdulkadir Popoola Ayinla-Agbe wealthy Ilorin trader and Salimotu Asabi.

He started early education at the Koranic school in the Ago Market area in Ilorin and then Ilorin Provincial primary School. Being top of his class, he was selected to proceed to Katsina Training College, which later became Barewa College, for further education in June 1922.

His contemporaries at Katsina College included Ahmadu Bello, the Sardauna of Sokoto, Aliyu Makama Bida, Suleiman Barau and Sir Kashim Ibrahim. An accomplished student and sportsman, Yahaya became Head Boy and football captain. He was also selected to give the welcome address to the then Governor of Nigeria, Sir Hugh Clifford, during the official commissioning of the college in 1924.

He taught at Katsina College for two years and his students included Alhaji Abubakar Tafawa Balewa who later became prime minister, Sir Ahmadu Bello, the Sardauna of Sokoto, Justice Mohammed Bello who later became Chief Justice of the Supreme Court of Nigeria, Justice Saidu Kawu, a former Chief Judge of Kwara State and later a Supreme Court Judge, Justice Mamman Nasir, Ibrahim Coomassie, who later became the Inspector General of the Nigerian Police, Alhaji Ibrahim Dasuki who later became the 18th Sultan of the Sokoto Caliphate as well as his son-in-law, Habba Habib of Borno, Shuaibu Abuja, the Sarkin Gobir of Kaligo, who later became the Emir of Gwandu, Alhaji Zulkarnaini Gambari and Alhaji Aliyu Abdulkadir aka Baba Agba, both of whom later became the 9th and 10th Emirs of Ilorin respectively.

Yahaya went on to become Headmaster of Ilorin Middle School and a prominent community leader, famously settling several disputes both among prominent leaders of the community and with the British colonial authorities for which he was awarded the Coronation Medal of King George VI in 1936.

== Political career ==
Yahaya became Chairman of the Ilorin Emirate Council in 1936, where he acquired the nickname “Yahaya Kiigbaa” (“Yahaya doesn't accept”) for his probity and staunch efforts to eliminate corruption in the council. In 1948, along with Sir Abubakar Tafawa Balewa, Yahaya was a member of the delegation to the first African conference in London and was received at Buckingham Palace by King George VI on October 8, 1948.

On his return from England, he was nominated as a member of the newly constituted Northern Regional House of Assembly and member of the Ilorin Native Authority Council. Following the coming into effect of the McPherson Constitution in 1952, Yahaya was elected as one of five members of the Northern Regional House of Assembly to join the central government legislature. That same year he became Minister for Health, joining a cabinet with Ahmadu Bello, the Sardauna of Sokoto, Alhaji Abubakar Tafawa Balewa and other prominent Northern Ministers. He was replaced in 1956 by Alhaji Ahman.

During his tenure as Minister of Health he recorded many achievements including the commissioning of several hospitals such as the medical school in Zaria and an orthopedic hospital in Kano and was responsible for the abolition of hospital charges in all General Hospitals in the North.

In 1973, Yahaya was appointed State Commissioner of Works during which time he signed the Asa Dam contract and commissioned several major projects. In 1981, President Shehu Shagari appointed Yahaya as one of the Committee of Elders. Politically, he had several dealings with the late Chief Obafemi Awolowo, Chief J.S Olawoyin, Chief S.B Awoniyi, Chief Gabriel Igbinedion and a host of other prominent politicians across the nation.

== Honours and appointments ==
In 1936, Yahaya was awarded the King George VI Coronation Medal. In the 1955 New Year Honours, he was awarded the Order of the British Empire by Queen Elizabeth II and the traditional emirate title of Madawaki of Ilorin. In 1981, Yahaya was conferred by President Shehu Shagari with the national honor of the Order of the Federal Republic. In 1982, he was awarded an honorary doctorate of letters from the University of Ilorin and the title of Atunuse of Erin-Ile.

He was a member and Chairman of numerous boards, including the Northern Nigeria Development Board, Nigeria Railway Corporation, Kwara State Water Corporation and Bacita Sugar Company. He is also particularly recognized as the person who gave Kwara State its name.

== Business career ==
Alhaji Yahaya also ventured into many successful businesses, prominent among which is Yahaya Marines & Co, a shipping and logistics company that was then located at the Apapa Wharf as well as real estate among which is the popular Madawaki Estates located along Ibrahim Taiwo Road, Ilorin.
