= Chief of Staff to the President (Nigeria) =

High-Ranking Official Responsible for Managing the Office of the President

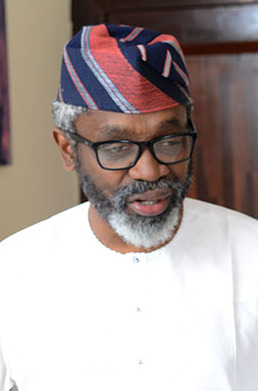
- Incumbent; Femi Gbajabiamila since 14 June 2023
- The Presidency
- Member of: Cabinet of Nigeria
- Reports to: President of Nigeria
- Appointer: President of Nigeria
- Formation: 1999 (27 years ago)
- First holder: Abdullahi Mohammed
- Website: Official website

The Chief of Staff to the President of Nigeria is a high-ranking official who manages the Office of the President. The position was created by President Olusegun Obasanjo in 1999, modelled after the White House Chief of Staff; and its duties are assigned by the President but primarily focused on managing the flow of information and people; advising the president on various issues – through these roles the position wields considerable influence.

== List ==
No.	Name	Term of office		President(s) served under
No.	Name	Start	End	President(s) served under
1	Abdullahi Mohammed	29 May 1999	2 June 2008	Olusegun Obasanjo Umaru Musa Yar'Adua
2	Gbolade Osinowo	2 June 2008	18 September 2008	Olusegun Obasanjo Umaru Musa Yar'Adua
Position abolished 18 September 2008 – 17 May 2010
3	Mike Oghiadomhe	17 May 2010	10 February 2014	Goodluck Jonathan
4	Jones Arogbofa	18 February 2014	29 May 2015	Goodluck Jonathan
5	Abba Kyari	27 August 2015	17 April 2020	Muhammadu Buhari
6	Ibrahim Gambari	13 May 2020	29 May 2023	Muhammadu Buhari
7	Femi Gbajabiamila	14 June 2023	Present	Bola Tinubu

== History ==
In May 1999, President Olusegun Obasanjo appointed Abdullahi Mohammed, previously the National Security Adviser as the first Chief of Staff to the President, he continued in this role until after the first year of the Umaru Musa Yar'Adua presidency, with his Deputy Gbolade Osinowo succeeding him. President Yar'Adua abolished the office, and instead relied on a group of close advisers.

Following President Yar'Adua's death, his successor Goodluck Jonathan assumed office as acting president. In a bid to consolidate his nascent presidency, Jonathan appointed his ally Mike Oghiadomhe as Chief of Staff and General Aliyu Gusau as his National Security Adviser. In February 2014, Oghiadomhe resigned from the position and was replaced by General Jones Arogbofa.

In 2015, Muhammadu Buhari won the presidential election. In August 2015, he appointed Abba Kyari as Chief of Staff. Following President Buhari's first illness and medical vacation, Kyari grew increasingly powerful and increasingly clashed with the Vice President Yemi Osinbajo. In 2019, Buhari ordered his cabinet to pass all government correspondences and requests through Abba Kyari, making him the principal channel of communication between the president and the government.

On 17 April 2020, Abba Kyari died of COVID-19. On 13 May 2020, Ibrahim Gambari was appointed as chief of staff.

On 1 March 2023, Bola Tinubu won the 2023 presidential election. On 2 June 2023, He appointed Femi Gbajabiamila, the 14th speaker of the House of Representatives as Chief of Staff.

== See also ==
- President of Nigeria
- Aso Rock Presidential Villa
