= Sulaimanu Barau =

- Sarkin Zazzau Abuja
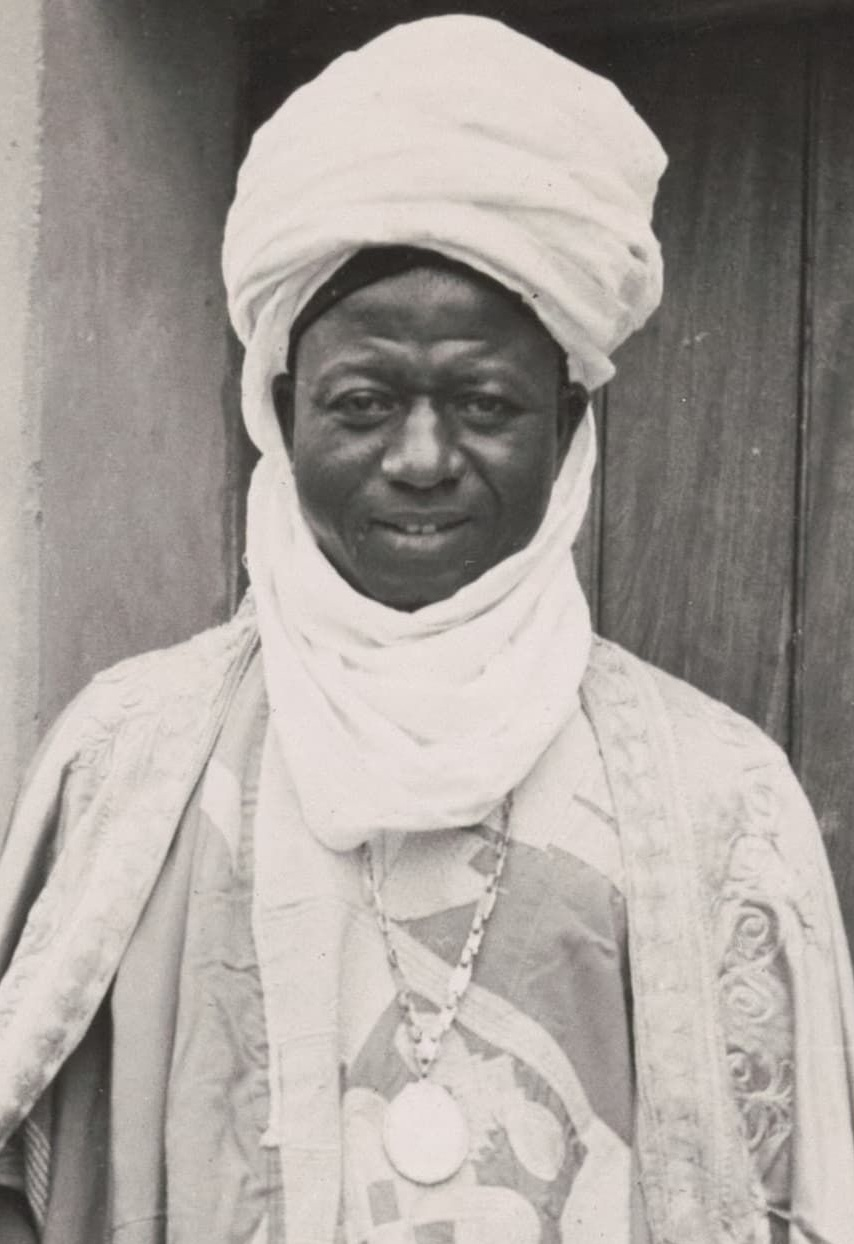

Emir of Abuja
- Reign: 13 March 1944 – 1979
- Predecessor: Musa Angulu
- Successor: Ibrahim Dodo
- Born: Abuja, Niger Province, Colonial Nigeria
- Died: 1979
- Issue: Bashir
- Father: Muhammad Gani

Suleimanu Barau, OBE (1903 – 1979) was the 6th emir of Abuja. Then, the name Abuja implied the name of the emirate controlled by the Hausa rulers who had fled Zazzau during the Fulani Jihad. He was born to the family of Mohammed Gani and attended Bida Provincial School. After completing his secondary studies, he proceeded to Katsina Training College for preparatory studies on education and teaching. In 1944, he was appointed emir of Abuja, by the time of his appointment, he was the first western trained emir in Nigeria.

== Life ==
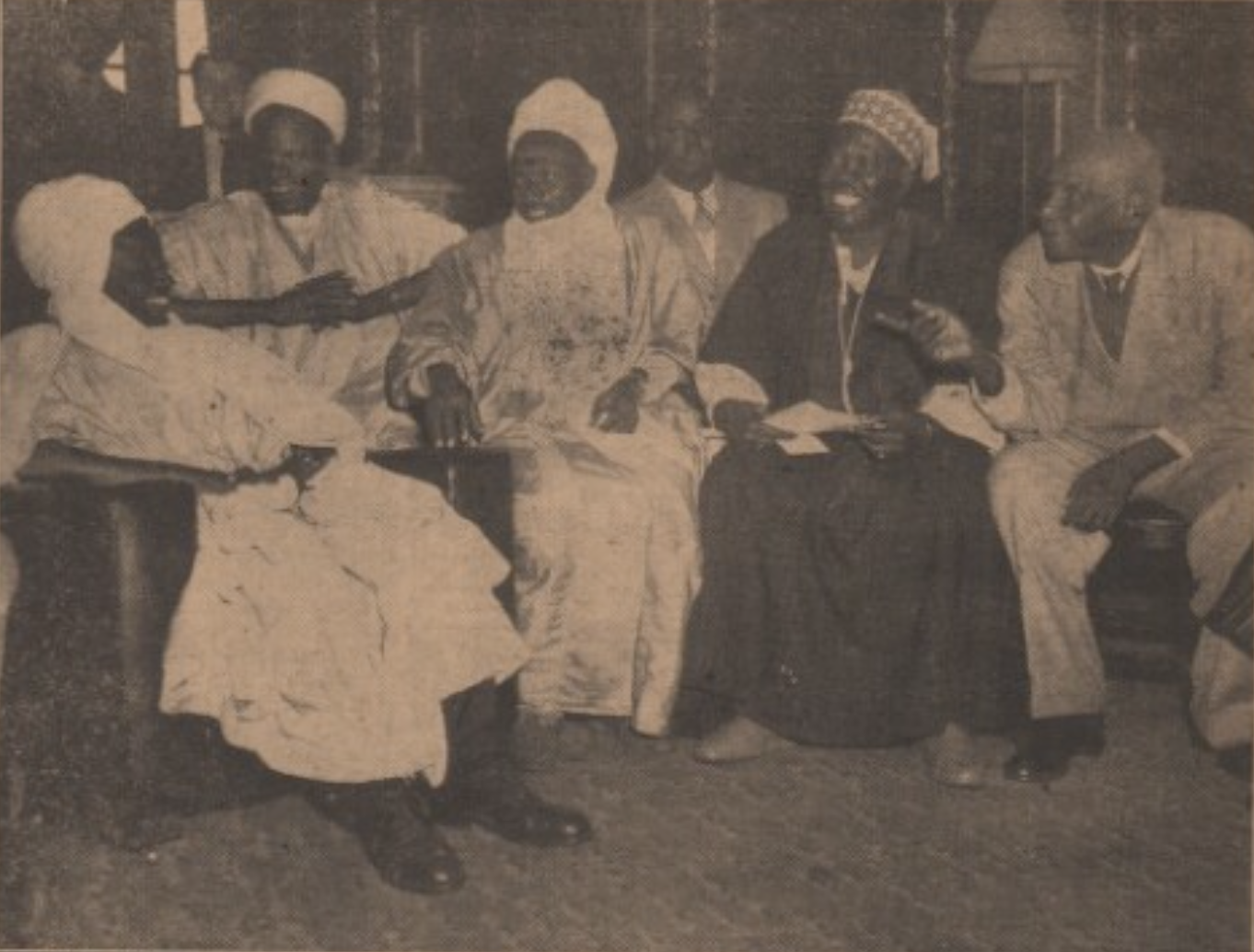
From left to right: Sulaiman Barau, Yahaya Ilorin, Usman Nagogo (Sarkin Katsina), E. E. E. Anwan, Adesoji Aderemi (Ooni of Ife) and T. A. J. Ogunbiyi at the 1948 British Conference of African Colonies held in London.

After spending five years at the Katsina College, he earned his teaching certificate. He then taught at Keffi and Bida from 1927 to 1931. However, he left the teaching profession afterwards when he became the district head of Diko in 1931. From there, he worked at the Abuja Native Administration in order to assist Emir Musa, who was reaching old age.

In 1944, he was made emir. As ruler of the emirate of Abuja, he introduced modern customs to replace some of the old traditions of the Hausa's. He put to rest a custom that demands subjects kneel down and pour dust on their heads in obeisance to him. He also initiated recordings of some of the remaining Abuja traditions.

As an educated paramount ruler, more responsibilities were bestowed upon. He was one of the few emirs appointed into the Northern Provinces Board of Education and was a member of the legislative council of Nigeria.
