= The Triumph (newspaper) =

Nigerian English-language newspaper

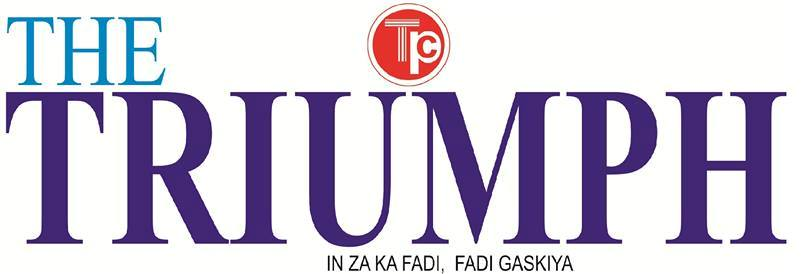
- Type: Weekly newspaper
- Owner: Kano State
- Publisher: Triumph Publishing Company
- Editor: Lawal Sabo Ibrahim
- Founded: June 1980
- Ceased publication: October 2012
- Relaunched: May 2017
- Language: English, Hausa Boko and Hausa Ajami
- Headquarters: Kano, Nigeria
- Website: triumphnews.org

The Triumph is a Nigerian English-language newspaper, published by the Triumph Publishing Company Limited and based in Kano, Kano State. It presently publishes a weekly edition with arrangements to return to publishing the daily, weekend and Sunday editions as well as the publishing of its sister vernacular newspapers of Albishir and Alfijir.

The Triumph newspaper was established in June 1980. The company is solely owned by the Ministry of Information, Youths and Culture of the Kano State government. In February 2000, the Jigawa State Governor, Alhaji Ibrahim Saminu Turaki threatened to blacklist the Triumph Publishing Company because he alleged that it had published negative reports about Jigawa State, which had once been part of Kano State. In January 2009, Kano State allocated N8.9 million for the company's activities. In October 2012, the state government closed down the company for alleged unviability.
