= Ogor Okuweh =

Nigerian politician

Ogor Leonard Okuweh

Member House of Representatives of Nigeria
- Incumbent
- Assumed office 2003

Personal details
- Occupation: Legislature
- Profession: Politician

Ogor Leonard Okuweh (born 1959) is a Nigerian politician. He is a member of Nigerian House of Representatives representing Isoko North/Isoko South federal constituency of Delta State under the People's Democratic Party in Nigeria.

== Education ==
Ogor Okuweh was born in Delta State, Nigeria. He obtained his WAEC from Notre Dame College Ozoro. He then went to Emile Woo-ff College of Accountancy where he obtained an A.I.B before attending Chartered Institute of Administration and finally became a Chartered Administrator. He also holds an International Executive Master of Business Administration, IEMBA in Strategic and Project Management from the Paris Graduate School of Management, PGSM in Paris, France.

== Political Career ==
In 2003, Ogor was elected in the Nigerian House of Representatives representing Isoko North/Isoko South federal constituency of Delta State.

During the 7th National Assembly, Okuweh served as the House Minority Leader. In June 2015, he became the House Majority Leader, succeeding Olufemi Hakeem Gbajabiamila. He served in that position until 2019, when he was succeeded by Ndudi Godwin Elumelu. In the 2019 general election, he was re-elected to represent the Isoko North/Isoko South Federal Constituency in the 9th National Assembly.
