= Ahmed Joda =

Nigerian administrator (1930–2021)

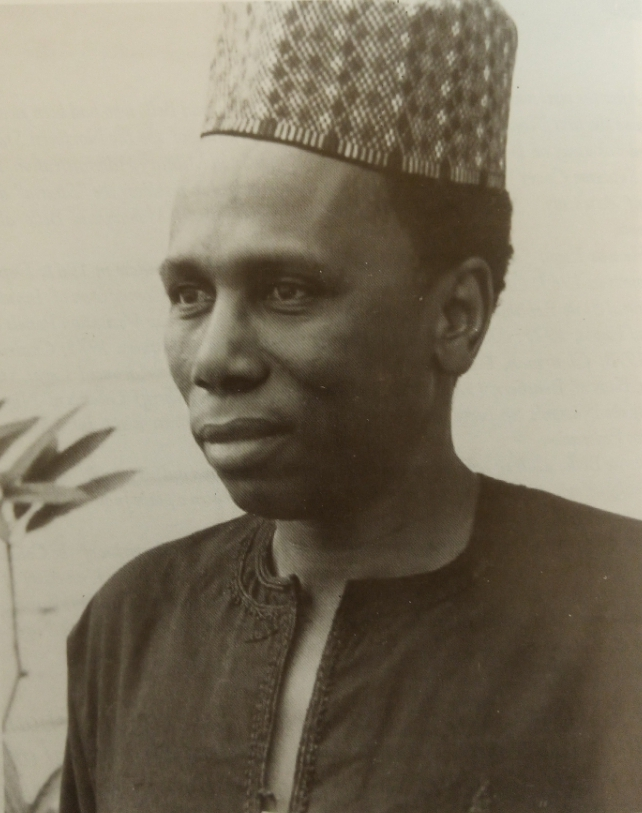
- Born: 13 February 1930; Yola, Nigeria
- Died: 13 August 2021 (aged 91); Yola, Nigeria
- Occupation: Administrator
- Known for: Kaduna Mafia

Ahmed Joda OFR, CON, CFR (13 February 1930 – 13 August 2021) was a Nigerian administrator who rose through the administrative cadre of the Northern regional government and then the federal civil service to retire as Permanent Secretary, Ministry of Industries. During the administration of the youthful Yakubu Gowon, he was considered to be among a group known as super Permanent Secretaries.

== Biography ==
Ahmed Joda was born in Yola to a Fulani family in 1930, his great-great-grandfather was Modibbo Raji, a 19th-century Islamic scholar and contemporary of Sheikh Usman Dan Fodio. Ahmed Joda attended Yola Elementary School and Yola Middle School before proceeding to Barewa College from 1945 to 1948. He worked briefly at Moor Plantation in Ibadan, and later as an agricultural officer in Yola before entering the field of journalism at Gaskiya Corporation in Zaria. He then attended Pitmans College, London from 1954 to 1956. On his return, he became a correspondent at the Nigerian Broadcasting Service from 1956 to 1960.

He then joined the Northern regional government as a Chief Information Officer then later Permanent Secretary from 1962 to 1967. In 1967, following the outbreak of the Nigerian Civil War, he was seconded to the Federal Civil Service as a Permanent Secretary serving in the Federal Ministries: Information, Education, and Industries, where he retired in 1978. He then retired into private business during the Second Nigerian Republic, where he served as chairman and board member of various companies including the: Nigerian National Petroleum Corporation, Nigerian Communications Commission, Pastoral Resolve, SCOA, Nigeria, Chagoury Group, Flour Mills of Nigeria, and the Nigerian LNG.

He was also a member of the 1988 Constituent Assembly which planned the constitutional transition of the Third Nigerian Republic. In 1999, he was appointed a member of the Committee to Advise the Presidency on Poverty Alleviation and in 2015, headed the Muhammadu Buhari presidential transition.

He died in Yola, Nigeria on 13 August 2021, after a brief illness.

== Honours ==
- In 1965, at the age 35, he received the Officer of the Order of the Federal Republic
- In 1979, Commander of the Order of the Niger
- In 2002, Commander of the Federal Republic
