= Ismaila Isa Funtua =

Nigerian statesman (1942–2020)

- Born: 17 January 1942; Funtua, Northern Region, British Nigeria
- Died: 20 July 2020 (aged 78); Abuja, Nigeria
- Education: Ahmadu Bello University; University of Manchester; National Institute of Policy and Strategic Studies
- Occupation: Administrator
- Known for: publishing, business
- Spouse: Hauwa Ali Akilu

Ismaila Isa Funtua OFR, mni (17 January 1942 – 20 July 2020) was a Nigerian statesman who served as a Federal Minister in the Second Nigerian Republic. After government service, Isa Funtua went into business where he cultivated clients, business associates and friends who extended his interests beyond the normal scope of a businessman. Ismaila Isa Funtua died on 20 July 2020 after a cardiac arrest.

He was a long time personal friend and close associate of President Muhammadu Buhari; and was a very influential figure in the Buhari administration. He was also a prominent member of the infamous Kaduna Mafia, a loose group of Nigerian businessmen, civil servants, intellectuals and military officers from Northern Nigeria.

== Life ==
Ismaila Isa was born in Funtua in January 1942. He received Islamic education, where he learnt the Qur'an, Islamic jurisprudence and the traditions of Muhammad. He later attended the Commercial College in Zaria, Federal Training Centre in Kaduna and the Ahmadu Bello University in Zaria. He also attended the University of Manchester, and was the Monitor-General of Course 9 of the Senior Executive Course at the National Institute of Policy and Strategic Studies.

A highly capable administrator, Isa Funtua started his career in the Katsina Native Authority, where he eventually rose through the ranks working in the defunct North Central State. He later joined United Textiles Limited in Kaduna, where he was the personnel manager showcasing "great managerial finesse" over ten thousand workers. He was a member of the 1994 Constitutional Conference under General Sani Abacha; was listed as a target by the regime.

He then retired into private business where he became a director of several companies. He was the founder of Funtua Textiles Limited, and managing director of the Democrat Newspaper. He was also the founder and Chairman of Bulet Construction Company (one of the largest indigenous construction companies in Nigeria), responsible for building several federal buildings. He was a Life Patron of the International Press Institute and the President of the Newspaper Proprietors Association of Nigeria.

== Death ==
Ismaila Isa Funtua died after a cardiac arrest in the late hours of 20 July 2020.

== Family ==
Isa Funtua was the grandson of Late Ammani Funtua. His father was called Isan Ammani when he was alive, he died in 1945 when Samaila was just three years old. He has 5 children, Abubakar, Fatima binta, Halima, Amina and Aliyu, he has 8 grandchildren but only 2 are publicly known which are isa abubakar isa and ibrahim ahmed kuru .
