= Mohammed Bello (jurist) =

Chief Justice of Nigeria from 1987 to 1995

Mohammed Bello GCON CON

Chief Justice of Nigeria
- In office 1987–1995
- Preceded by: Ayo Gabriel Irikefe
- Succeeded by: Muhammad Lawal Uwais

Personal details
- Born: 1930 Katsina, Northern Region, British Nigeria
- Died: 4 November 2004 (aged 73–74)
- Education: Lincoln's Inn

Mohammed Bello GCON (1930 – 4 November 2004) was a Nigerian Jurist who was the Chief Justice of Nigeria from 1987 to 1995.

== Early life ==
Bello was born in Katsina in 1930. His father, Muhammadu Gidado was an Islamic jurist and held the position of mufti in the royal court of Muhammadu Dikko; he was a descendant of Mallam Isyaka Daura, a contemporary of Uthman dan Fodio the founder of the Sokoto Caliphate. Bello received a traditional Islamic education at home with illustrious scholars before being sent to Katsina Elementary School and Katsina Middle School and attended Barewa College from 1945 to 1948.

== Education ==
After leaving college, he trained as a manager at the United Africa Company (hitherto the Royal Niger Company). However, on the advice of Northern elders he was selected alongside his childhood friend Mamman Nasir to read Latin at University College Ibadan before proceeding to England where he was instructed in the law and called to the bar at Lincoln's Inn in 1956. He completed his pupillage at Middle Temple in Fitzgerald Chambers in 1958 and returned in service of the Government of Northern Nigeria.

== Crown service ==
He was made a Crown counsel to the Government of Northern Nigeria in Kaduna. In this role, he served as a colonial civil servant and prosecuted in the name of the Crown through independence in 1960. In 1961, he became the first chief magistrate in Northern Nigeria. In 1962, he spent a year at the Harvard Law School. He became Director of Public Prosecution in Northern Nigeria, in 1964.

== High court ==
The fall of the First Republic and the militarization of law and politics led to the Nigerian Civil War, Bello was made a high court judge in Kaduna, in 1966, and was acting and later Chief Justice of Northern Nigeria between 1969 and 1975. After nine years as a judge in the high courts of Northern Nigeria, Bello was appointed by military head of state Murtala Mohammed to the Supreme Court of Nigeria.

== Recognition and honours ==
At the Supreme Court, he gained respect among his peers for his interpretation of the law and upholding the principles of the court in judicial matters.

Bello was awarded the Order of the Niger in two classes – Commander of the Order of the Nigeria; and, in 1987, Grand Commander of the Order of Niger.

He also received several other honours, including from the World Jurist Association; conferred honorary doctorates from the University of Ibadan, University of Lagos, Obafemi Awolowo University, and Ahmadu Bello University in Zaria.

== Chief justice ==
In 1987, Bello became the first northern Chief Justice of Nigeria. As chief justice, he steered the wheels of the judiciary towards the rule of law and largely attempted to check the military's use of force in the administration of justice. He nonetheless, viewed the supremacy of power as legitimate an action which drew him criticism as a military apologist.

== Later life ==
In 1995, he retired from the bench and became a statutory member of the Council of State. He was involved as either patron, trustee or adviser to several associations including Chairman of Katsina Foundation, Gamji Members’ Association, Barewa Old Boys Association, and the Nigerian Bar Association. Mohammed Bello died on 4 November 2004.
