= Barewa College =

Secondary school in Nigeria

Location
- Gaskiya Road, Zaria; Zaria, Kaduna State; Nigeria
- 11.085278°N 7.698889°E

Information
- Type: Secondary school
- Motto: Man Jada Wajada (He Who Strives Shall Succeed)
- Established: 1921
- Founders: Sir Hugh Clifford, G. A. J. Bieneman
- Gender: Boys
- Age: 11 to 18
- Houses: Bello Kagara, Lugard, Clifford, Dan Hausa, Mallam Smith, Nagwamatse, Bienemann, Mort, Jafaru, Suleiman Barau
- Colours: White and Navy Blue
- Former pupils: Old Boys
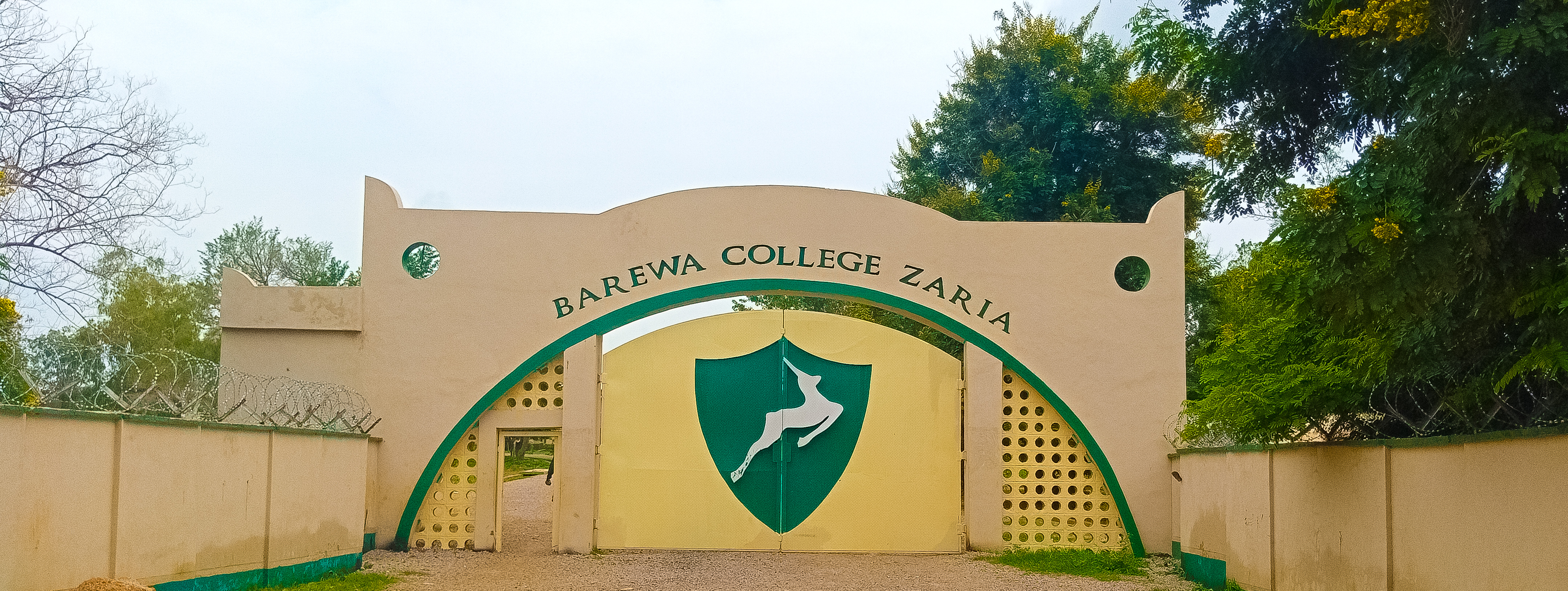
- Gate of Barewa College Zaria

Barewa College is a college in Zaria, Kaduna State, northern Nigeria. Founded in 1921 by British Governor General Hugh Clifford, it was originally known as Katsina College. It switched its name to Kaduna College in 1938 and to Government College, Zaria in 1949 before settling on Barewa College. It is one of the largest boarding schools in Northern Nigeria and was the most-celebrated post-primary schools there up to the early 1960s. The school is known for the large number of elites from the region who attended and counts among its alumni include Tafawa Balewa who was Prime Minister of Nigeria from 1960 to 1966, four heads of state of Nigeria. The school is located along Gaskiya road in the Tukur -Tukur area of Zaria.

== History ==
Hugh Clifford, a British governor-general, founded Katsina College in 1921. It was first built in Katsina by Emir Muhammadu Dikko and officially opened in 1922. The historical building was declared a national monument and is now a museum in the state. It was then moved to Kaduna and its name was then changed to Kaduna College in 1938 and then to Government College, Zaria in 1949. When some of the provincial secondary schools were poised to become full secondary schools in 1956, the college was renamed Zaria Secondary School. According to Clifford, the reason the college was founded in and named after Katsina was that:

...Katsina in ancient days was held in high repute throughout the Muhammadan Emirates as a seat of learning and of piety; and it is good, I think, that this tradition should be perpetuated. My second reason was that Katsina, though it is an important town and the administrative capital of an important Emirate, is not as yet so close to the railway and to the commercial centres of Nigeria as to make it unsuitable for that quiet and tranquillity and that freedom from distractions which are so necessary for young men who are devoting their lives to study.

It is Northern Nigeria's first secondary school, initially catering to children of royalty and a select few from the aristocracy. Alhaji Ahmadu Bello, the first Premier of Northern Nigeria and an alumnus of the college, described it in his autobiography as a training ground for princes, likening it to the schools set up by the British in India.

== Houses ==
Memorable names of the dormitories include Bello Kagara House, Lugard House, Clifford House, Dan Hausa House, Mallam Smith House, Nagwamatse House, Bienemann House, Mort House and, later, Jafaru House and Suleiman Barau House, which were called New House A and New House B during their construction. These dormitories housed up to a thousand pupils at any one time, in the vast landscape east of Tudun Wadda.

== Notable alumni ==
Notable alumni of Barewa include:

- Ahmadu Bello — Premier of Northern Nigeria.
- Abubakar Tafawa Balewa — Prime Minister of Nigeria
- Hassan Katsina — Governor of Northern Nigeria.
- Yakubu Gowon — military ruler of Nigeria.
- Murtala Mohammed — Military Ruler of Nigeria.
- Shehu Shagari — President of Nigeria.
- Umaru Musa Yar'Adua — President of Nigeria.
- Ibrahim Dasuki — Sultan of Sokoto.
- Sa'adu Abubakar — Sultan of Sokoto.
- Shehu Abubakar — Emir of Gombe (1984–2014).
- Mohammed Bello — Chief Justice of Nigeria.
- Alhaji Yahaya Madawaki of Ilorin — First Northern Region Minister of Health (BOBA No. 54).
- Iya Abubakar — Mathematician and Politician.
- Abdulkadir Ahmed — Governor of the Central Bank.
- Ibrahim Mahmud Alfa — Governor of Kaduna State.
- Jibril Aminu — Professor of Cardiology, and former Nigerian Ambassador to the USA.
- Afakriya Gadzama — Director general State Security Service.
- Adamu Ciroma — Governor of the Central Bank of Nigeria.
- Magaji Muhammed — Minister of Interior, Minister of industry and Nigerian ambassador to the kingdom of Saudi Arabia.
- Umaru mutallab — Minister of Economic Development and Banking veteran.
- Balarabe Abbas Lawal — Secretary to the Kaduna State Government and Minister of Environment of Nigeria.
- Ibrahim Coomassie — Inspector general of the Nigerian Police.
- Umaru Dikko — Minister for Transportation.
- Nasir Ahmad el-Rufai — Governor of Kaduna State.
- Nuhu Ribadu — Former chairman of the Economic and Financial Crimes.
- Idris Legbo Kutigi — Chief justice, Supreme Court of Nigeria.
- Mohammed Shuwa — First commander of the Nigerian Army's 1st Infantry Division and former federal commissioner of trade.
- Suleiman Takuma — Journalist and politician.
- Abdulrahman Bello Dambazau — Former chief of Army Staff.
- Albani Zaria —Islamic scholar.
- Mazi Nwonwu — Journalist at BBC and editor-in-chief of Omenana Magazine.
- Mohammed Tukur. Usman — Permanent Secretary of the Federal Ministry of Works.
- Aminu Kano — Influential politician.

== Gallery ==
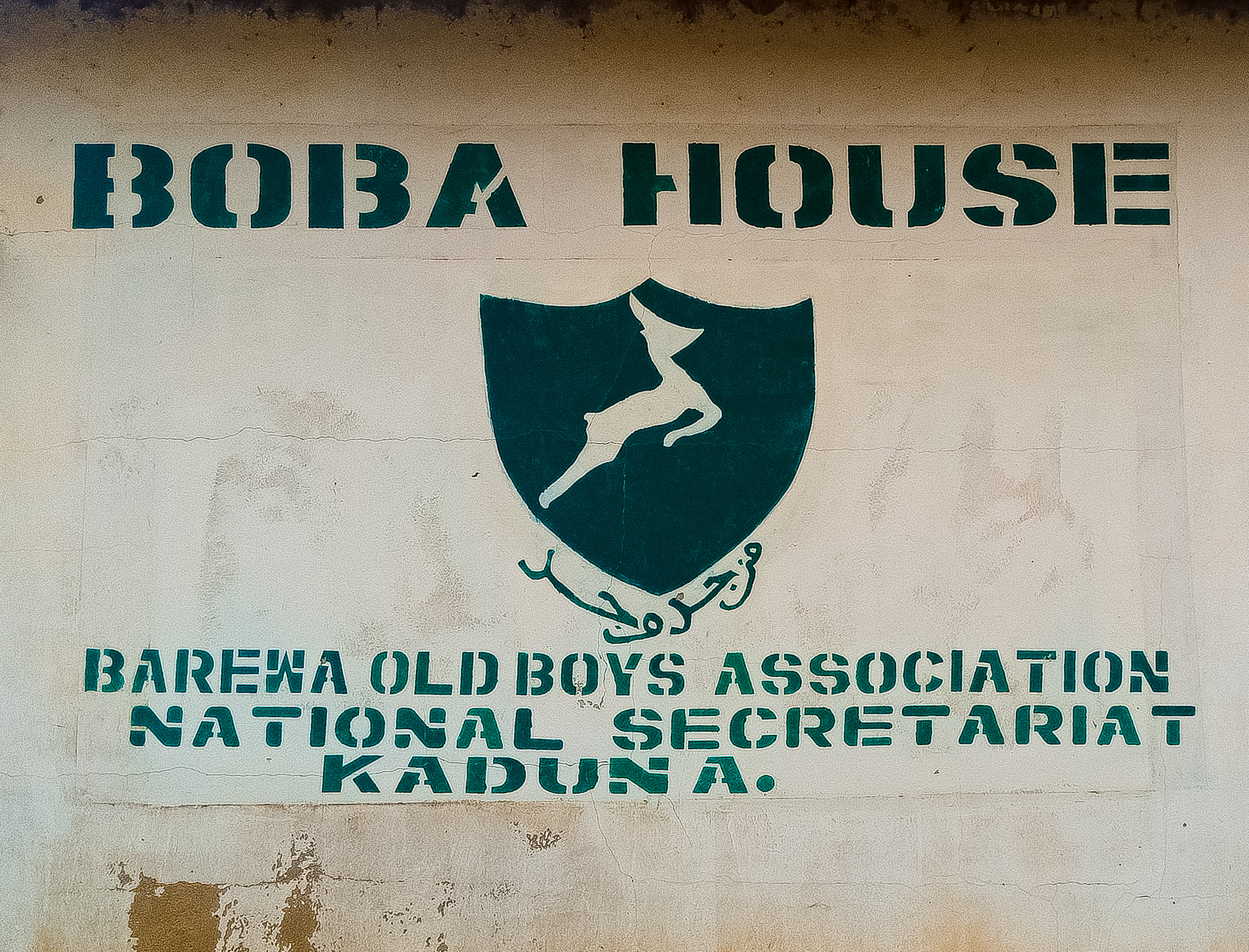
The Barewa College Association Old Boys National Secretariat is In Kaduna.

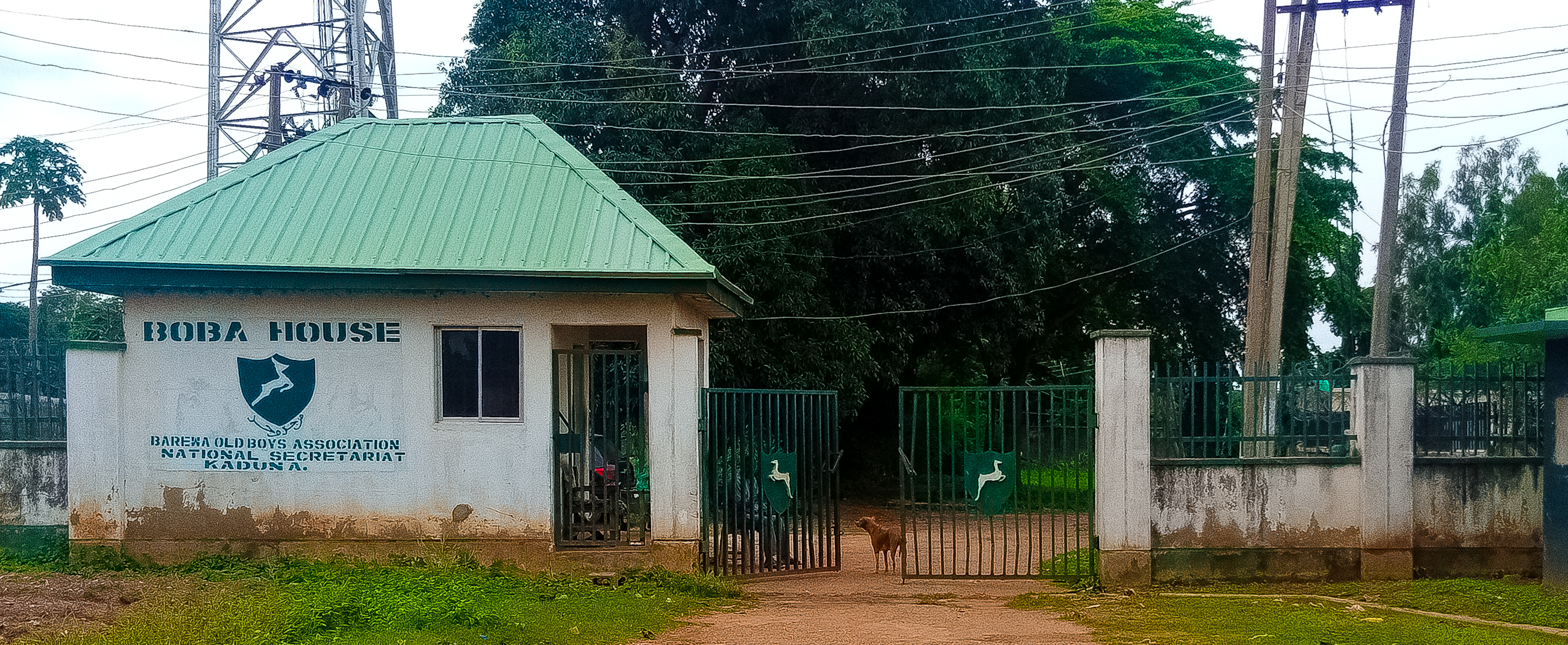
Barewa College Old Boys Association
