= Shagari =

Shagari may refer to:

- Shagari, Nigeria, a Local Government Area in Sokoto State
- Shehu Shagari (1925–2018), Nigerian president
- Shagari Alleyne (born 1984), American basketballer
- Bello Bala Shagari (born 1988), youth activist and filmmaker
- Shagari Mohammed (born 1990), Nigerian footballer
- Muhammad Bala Shagari (born 1949), District Head of Shagari Local Government, in Sokoto State
- Muktar Shagari (born 1956), Nigerian Minister of Water Resources
