= Ghana Must Go (disambiguation) =

Ghana Must Go may refer to:

- Ghana Must Go, related to the deportation of West African migrants from Nigeria
- Ghana Must Go (novel)
- Ghana Must Go (film)
