= Bello Bala Shagari =

Nigerian activist

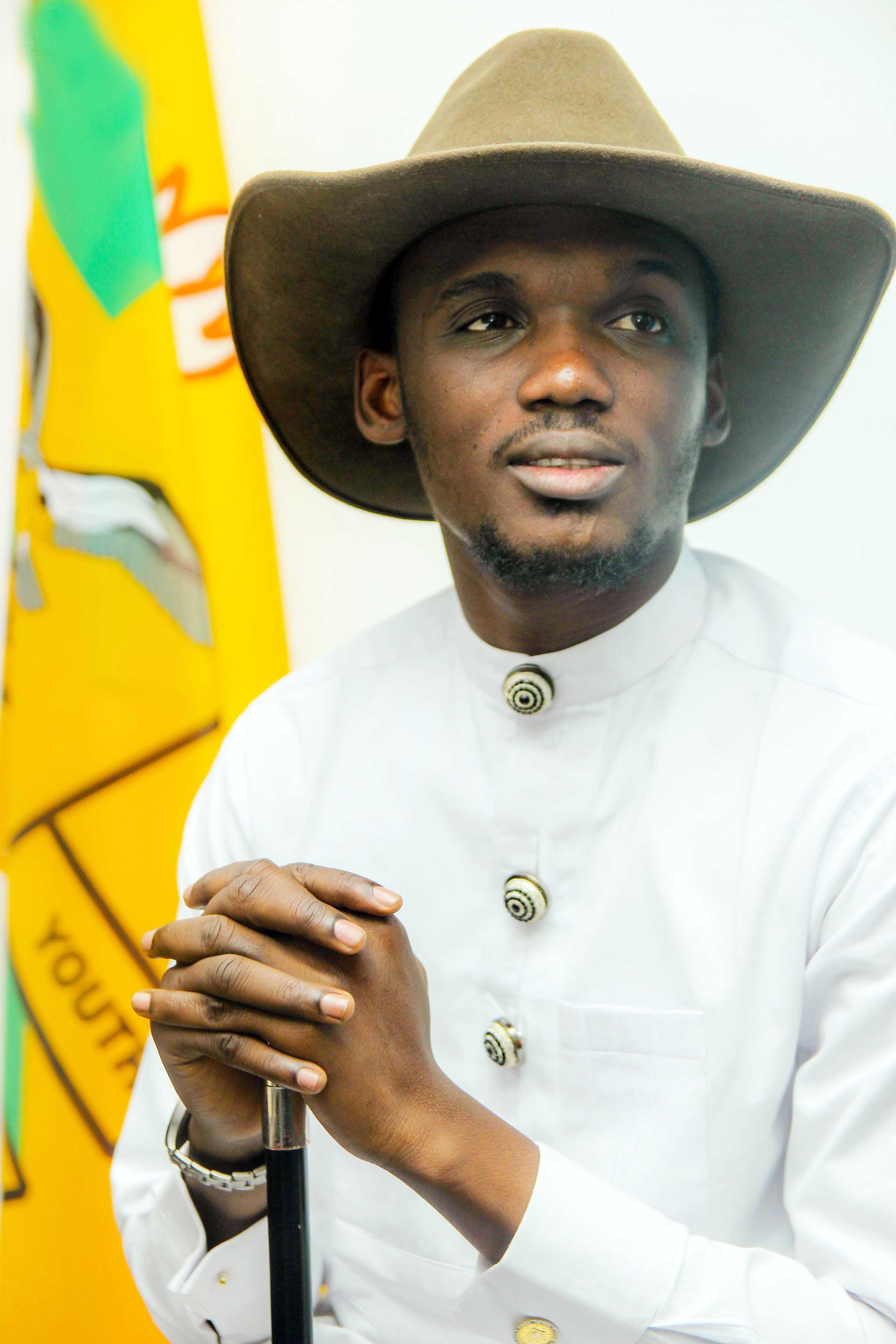
- Bello Shagari portrait

1st Chairperson Non-Aligned Movement Youth Organization
- Incumbent
- Assumed office September 2026
- General Secretary: Yoweri Museveni
- Preceded by: Position established

President of the National Youth Council of Nigeria
- In office 24 July 2018 – 9 March 2020

Personal details
- Born: Muhammad Bello Bala Shagari; 26 April 1988 (age 38) Sokoto, Sokoto State, Nigeria
- Parent: Muhammad Bala Shagari
- Relatives: Shehu Shagari (Paternal grandfather); Gidado Idris (Maternal grandfather)
- Education: Middlesex University
- Nickname: Belshagy
- Website: belloshagari.com

Bello Shagari Hausa pronunciation (born 26 April 1988) is a Nigerian youth leader, international youth development practitioner, advocate, and documentary filmmaker who has been the Chairperson of the Non-Aligned Movement Youth Organization since 2026. He is the first democratically elected global head of the organisation.

He previously served as the President of the National Youth Council of Nigeria from 2018 to 2020 and is the traditional titleholder of Yarima of Shagari (Prince of Shagari) in Sokoto State. He led other prominent youth organizations such as The Royal African Young Leadership Forum. He is among the foremost global youth leaders.

== Background ==
Bello is a notable grandson of Nigeria's former president Alhaji Shehu Shagari who is involved in Youth Activism. He announced his grandfather's death on 28 December 2018. His father is the president's eldest son, Mallam Muhammad Bala Shagari of Shagari, Sokoto State. He had his early education in Sokoto and later had his SSCE in Police Secondary School Minna, Niger State. In secondary school, he served as the Cadet Commander in the School's Cadet Club. He is a graduate of Business Information Systems & Information Technology from Middlesex University London. Shortly after his graduation in 2012, he voluntary taught briefly as a teacher in a Primary and Secondary Schools at his hometown Shagari. He holds the chieftaincy title of the Yarima of Shagari.

== Career ==
Bello Shagari founded Barcode Multimedia in 2012. He has produced documentaries and contents on politics, history and advocacy. One of such documentaries "One Nation, One Destiny" project which began in 2013, a documentary of the history of Nigeria focusing on President Shehu Shagari's long experiences since pre-independence to his eventual emergence as Nigeria's first executive president in 1979.

Accordingly, in the course of research and interviews, Bello has come across a number of prominent politicians, diplomats, historians and many leaders. Some of his encounters include the past and present Nigeria Heads of State such as Yakubu Gowon, Olusegun Obasanjo, Gen. Muhammadu Buhari, Ibrahim Badamasi Babangida, Abdulsalami Abubakar and Goodluck Ebele Jonathan.

He also interviewed high-profile personalities such as Prof. Jean Herskovits, historian of the State University of New York, U.S. ambassador and diplomat Thomas Pickering, and Clifford May, a former New York Times reporter and president of the Foundation for Defense of Democracy, among others.

As a youth activist, Bello was appointed as the chairman of the National Youth Council of Nigeria Sokoto State Chapter in 2017 after protesting and replacing a 52-year-old man who was wrongly occupying the position. His activism became stronger and he ran for the presidency of the National Youth Council of Nigeria in the 2018 Unity Congress held in Gombe which he won in a keenly contested election which has brought him to National prominence in 2018. As the Chairman of NYCN Sokoto State Chapter, he partnered with other Government and Non Governmental Organisations to initiate a program known as RRTE in Sokoto State to curb unemployment, drug abuse and community violence.

He is now involved in party politics and aspired for the chairmanship of the Abuja Municipal Area Council elections AMAC, under the All Progressives Congress in 2021.

== NYCN presidency ==
Shagari was elected president of the National Youth Council of Nigeria at the Unity Congress in Gombe State on 25 July 2018. Shagari polled 249 votes as against 234 polled by his opponent, AlMustapha Asuku Abdullahi. As a result, he emerged as the president. Prior to his emergence as the President of the National Youth Council of Nigeria, Shagari was the Chairman of The NYCN Sokoto State Chapter. At the 3rd General Afro-Arab Youth Conference held in Khartoum, Sudan, Shagari emerged as the Coordinator of west Africa, of the Afro-Arab Youth Council. Shortly after becoming the president of NYCN, Shagari secured 3,700 empowerment opportunities for the Nigerian youth.

NYCN under Shagari became well known because of the publicity he created for the organization through mass media and social media. He became very vocal on issues concerning youth inclusion especially during the 2019 General Elections where his critics accused him of working for the opposition as he refuses to publicly endorse the ruling party. But afterwards, he succeeded in a lobby which led to the creation of the Ministry For Youth & Sports Development in Kano and the appointment of the State Chairman the Commissioner by Governor Abdullahi Umar Ganduje. He saw the organization's return to participation in international activities especially across Africa. However, many of his programs at home failed as a result of the crises rocking NYCN during his time.

He is counted among the most influential youth in Nigeria barely six months in office and has been inducted into the community of Crans Montana New Leaders of Tomorrow in 2019.

=== Resignation ===
Crises have been rocking the National Youth Council since 2014, after a controversial election was held which led to the removal of the Minister for Youth & Sports Development at the time. However, reconciliation efforts ushered in newly elected executives led by Shagari in Gombe as supervised by the Federal Ministry for Youth and Sport. Soon after the election, opposition began resurfacing among the members of the board of trustees of the NYCN. Another faction was to emerge three months later in Port Harcourt. That coupled with opposition from some government elements lashed together to frustrate the Shagari led NYCN which became increasingly unpopular with some stakeholders. However, all efforts to remove Shagari from office failed including an attempt to pass a vote of no confidence against him. Later, a vote of confidence was successfully passed on him by his executives. As the crises brought the council activities to a halt by producing 3 other factions, Shagari resigned voluntarily on 9 March 2020 as a gesture of peace. Shagari is the first NYCN President to voluntarily resign. He was widely celebrated for his actions.

== Awards ==
- Youth Icon of The Year 2018 by National Association of Voluntary Youth Organisations.
- Award of Excellence by Abdulsalami Abubakar Institute for Peace and Sustainable Development
- Honorary Fellowship Award by The Governing Council of The Security and Forensic Studies Nigeria
- Most Influential Young Nigerian 2018 - Leadership and Civic Society
- Crans Montana New Leaders of Tomorrow, Dakhla, Morocco, 2019
- Award of Royal African Medal and Recognition in Governance & Leadership by Royal African Young Leadership Forum RAYLF 2020.
