= Janet Akinrinade =

Nigerian politician

Minister of State for Internal Affairs
- In office 1979–1982
- President: Shehu Shagari

Commissioner, Plateau State
- In office 1982–1983
- Governor: Solomon Lar

Personal details
- Born: 13 March 1930 Iseyin, Oyo State, Nigeria
- Died: 1994
- Party: Nigerian People's Party
- Occupation: Politician

Janet Akinrinade (13 March 1930 – 1994) was a Nigerian politician who was Minister of State, Internal Affairs during the administration of President Shehu Shagari. In the elections to the 1977 Nigerian Constituent Assembly, she was the only woman elected.

== Early life ==
Born in Iseyin to a family of four children, Akinrinade was the only girl and last child of her parents. She lost her parents at a young age and an elder brother took care of funding her primary education. She did not attend secondary school but through self-tutorship she passed her GCE O'levels exam. Akinrinade got married in 1950, to T.A. Akinrinade, a tobacco company executive and was a housewife for some period. In 1957, she took courses in Secretarial studies, Cookery and Dress Making in London. In 1964, when her husband's firm, the Nigerian Tobacco Company had a scuffle with local tobacco farmers, Akinrinade played an important part in orchestrating a peace agreement. Due to her role in the crisis, the Soun of Ogbomosho gave her and her husband a chieftaincy title.

== Political career ==
She started her political career in 1970, when she became a councillor in Iseyin, she was in that position for seven years. In 1977, Akinrinade won election to the Constituent Assembly, a year later, she joined the Nigerian People's Party and was the party's deputy governor candidate for Oyo State in 1979. An alliance between her party and the governing party, NPN led her to be nominated as a Minister during the nation's Second Republic.

In 1982, she left her ministerial post and became a commissioner in Plateau State under the leadership of Solomon Lar.
