= Deportation of West African migrants from Nigeria =

Political slogan

The deportation of West African migrants from Nigeria occurred following a January 1983 executive order from President Shehu Shagari, which forced illegal immigrants to leave the country or face arrest. As a result of Shagari's order, over two million migrants were deported, including one million Ghanaian nationals.

== History ==
Many of the migrants had been attracted to Nigeria because of the 1970s oil boom, but by 1983 the economy had weakened. Shagari's order was in alleged response to the religious disturbances that had engulfed parts of the country in 1980 (known as the Kano Riots) and 1981. Prior to 1983, the expulsions of immigrants had occurred several times in West Africa for various reasons. These include Ghana's deportation of Nigerians in 1954 and 1969 and Togo's deportation of nationals from Côte d'Ivoire, Dahomey, and Nigeria in 1958.

=== Conditions for migrants ===
The primary route to Ghana was westwards, passing through Benin and Togo. Because of an attempted coup the previous year, the President of Ghana, Jerry Rawlings, had closed the main land crossing with Togo, and to avoid a sudden influx of returnees, Togo then also shut its borders with Benin. Therefore, once the migrants reached Benin, the way out was restricted and they were forced to remain in the port of Cotonou, the country's seat of government, attempting to find a boat to Ghana. After they had been stranded for more than a week, Ghana reopened its borders, causing Togo to do likewise so that the Ghanaians could return home.

== Legacy ==
=== "Ghana Must Go" bag ===
A type of cheap matted woven nylon zipped tote bags, used by the migrants to move their belongings, got the moniker "Ghana Must Go" during the migration. As of 2019, the bag is still commonly referred to with this name in most parts of Nigeria, Ghana, and certain parts of West Africa. In 2020, New York-based Nigerian photographer Obinna Obioma used the bags to fashion clothing and other items in an exhibition on migration titled Anyi N'Aga ("We Are Going" in Igbo).

Worldwide, the bag has a variety of other names associating it with migrants. In Germany it is called the "Türkenkoffer" (Turkish suitcase), in the US, the "Chinatown tote", in Guyana, the "Guyanese Samsonite", and in various other places, the "Refugee Bag".

== See also ==
- Ghana Must Go, 2013 debut novel by Taiye Selasi
