= Beninese people in Nigeria =

- (Benin) (Nigeria)

Regions with significant populations
- Kebbi State, Kwara State, Niger State, Borno State and other border regions

Languages
- English (Nigerian English), French (official language of Benin), Yoruba, Bariba, Hausa, Fulfulde, and other local languages

Religion
- Predominantly Christianity and Islam; also traditional beliefs

The Beninese people in Nigeria are citizens born in the Republic of Benin or holders of Beninese nationality who reside in the Federal Republic of Nigeria—two West African countries that share a border of 809 km (503 mi) in length.

== Overview ==
Immigration from Benin to Nigeria has historical and contemporary dimensions. During the colonial era, when territories were under French rule (French Dahomey) and British rule, respectively, cross-border migration was frequent due to cultural, linguistic, and trade ties among the Yoruba, Bariba, and other ethnic groups living on both sides of the boundary. After independence, the movement continued, reflecting both economic opportunities in Nigeria and the permeability of the border. In recent decades, migration has been shaped by challenges including cross-border smuggling, informal trade, and security concerns. Violence and instability in northern Benin, linked to armed groups operating in the wider Sahel region, including the jihadist insurgency in Northern Benin, have also contributed to internal displacement and raised concerns about refugee flows and irregular migration into Nigeria. The situation underscores the complexity of managing a shared border where historic ties, economic exchange, and contemporary security pressures intersect.

The Hausa and Fula (Fulbe) communities are central to the cross-border connections between northern Benin (particularly Alibori) and Nigeria's Kebbi State. These links long predate colonial boundaries and continue to shape trade, language, and religion in the region. Hausa migrants began settling in Benin during the colonial period, often through commerce, and Hausa language remains widely used as a lingua franca in markets and cross-border communication. Fulbe population is more diverse: some groups, such as the Borgou Fulbe, have been established in Benin for generations, while others, often referred to as “Zamfara Fulbe,” maintain strong ties to Nigeria. Fulbe communities are closely involved in pastoralism and seasonal transhumance, regularly moving across the border in search of grazing land and exchanging cattle breeds between zebu and taurine varieties. These long-standing social, economic, and religious ties provide cohesion across the frontier, but they can also generate friction, particularly in disputes over land use and herding routes. Such tensions are further complicated by insecurity and instability in the wider borderlands region.

The closure of the Benin–Nigeria border has significantly impacted local populations on both sides. Implemented by Nigeria in 2019 to combat smuggling, particularly of rice, the policy disrupted established trade routes vital for border communities' livelihoods. Residents in settlements like Seme-Krake, heavily reliant on cross-border commerce, faced economic hardships as goods became scarce and prices soared. The informal sector, encompassing small-scale traders and transporters, suffered due to halted transactions and restricted mobility. Additionally, the closure exacerbated existing tensions, as communities resorted to alternative routes, sometimes involving illicit activities, to maintain their economic activities. Despite the reopening of some border points, the long-term effects on these communities underscore the challenges of balancing security concerns with the economic realities of border populations.

Media reports have highlighted various challenges at border crossings between Benin and Nigeria. Incidents such as frequent power outages have disrupted customs operations, while allegations of corruption among border officials have been reported, affecting the efficiency and fairness of inspections. These issues have compounded the difficulties faced by traders and travelers, increasing delays and the costs of cross-border commerce, and have drawn attention to the need for improved infrastructure and governance at official border points.

== See also ==
- Immigration to Nigeria
