= Ebun Oyagbola =

Nigerian diplomat and politician (1931–2025)

- Born: Adenike Ebunoluwa Akinola; 5 May 1931; Igan Alade, Colony and Protectorate of Nigeria
- Died: 28 February 2025 (aged 93)
- Occupations: Diplomat; politician
- Years active: 1958–2025

Adenike Ebunoluwa Oyagbola (née Akinola; 5 May 1931 – 28 February 2025) was a Nigerian diplomat and politician best known for being the first female cabinet minister in Nigeria upon her appointment in 1979.

== Life and career ==
Born on 5 May 1931, Oyagbola was a native of Igan Alade, a town in Yewa North local government area of Ogun State, South-Western Nigeria where she was born and completed her early education. She then trained to be a teacher at a training college in Ilaro, thereafter, she taught at schools in Yewa and then Mushin, before becoming headmistress of an elementary school in Mushin. In 1960, she went abroad for further training in accounting.

== Political career ==
Oyagbola joined the Federal Civil Service in 1963 after completing her studies in England, United Kingdom. In December 1979, she became Nigeria's first female cabinet minister after she was appointed Minister of National Planning under the Shehu Shagari-led administration, a position she held until October 1983. She later became Nigeria's. Ambassador to the United Mexican States of Panama, Costa Rica and Guatemala. She served as the President of the Nigerian chapter of Attitudinal Healing International at the time of her death.

== Career in education and civil service ==
After completing her studies abroad, Oyagbola joined the Nigerian Federal Civil Service in 1963. She worked in various administrative roles and built a reputation as an efficient public administrator during the early years of Nigeria’s independence.Her experience in public administration and government planning later positioned her for a major role in national politics.

== Diplomatic service ==
After leaving ministerial office, Oyagbola served as Nigeria’s ambassador to Mexico, with concurrent accreditation to Panama, Costa Rica, and Guatemala. Her diplomatic service strengthened Nigeria’s international relations, particularly with Latin American countries.

== Advocacy and public engagement ==
Oyagbola was involved in social development work and served as president of the Nigerian chapter of Attitudinal Healing International, promoting emotional well-being and peace-building. She was also an advocate for women’s empowerment and encouraged greater female participation in leadership and governance.

== Death and legacy ==
Ebun Oyagbola died on 28 February 2025 at the age of 94. Nigerian leaders, including President Bola Tinubu and Ogun State officials, described her as a trailblazer for women in politics. She is remembered as a pioneer who opened doors for women in Nigerian governance and diplomacy.
