= Muhammad Bala Shagari =

Nigerian military officer (born 1949)

District Head of Shagari
- Incumbent
- Assumed office 1997

Member of the FCT Judicial Service Committee
- In office 2009–2014

Member of the Constituent Assembly
- In office 1988–1989
- Constituency: Yabo

Personal details
- Born: 17 March 1949 (age 77) Shagari, Northern Region, British Nigeria (now in Sokoto State, Nigeria)
- Children: Bello Bala Shagari
- Parent: Shehu Shagari
- Education: Barewa College; South Gloucestershire and Stroud College; Nigerian Defence Academy

Military service
- Allegiance: Nigeria
- Branch/service: Nigerian Army
- Years of service: 1975 – 1984
- Rank: Captain

Muhammad Bala Shagari (born 17 March 1949) is a retired Nigerian military officer and the district head of Shagari Local Government in Sokoto State, Nigeria. He holds the traditional title of Sarkin Mafara of Shagari. He is the first son of Nigeria’s first elected president Shehu Shagari. He was in the military during his father’s presidency

== Background ==
Shagari is the eldest son of former president Shehu Shagari by his wife Hajiya Amina. He was born in the town of Shagari, Sokoto State in 1949. He attended the prestigious Barewa College, Zaria and proceeded to South Gloucestershire and Stroud College Bristol, United Kingdom. He later joined the Nigerian Defence Academy in 1975 where he was a member of the 18th Regular Course. In the aftermath of the December 1983 coup in Nigeria led by General Muhammadu Buhari which removed his father, he was detained briefly and was later forcefully retired from the Nigerian army without offense at the rank of Captain.

== Military career ==
Shagari was posted to his first unit, 82nd Infantry Battalion Katsina in February,1976. He was to serve in Katsina for 4years as a platoon commander, a company 2IC, a Battalion Adjutant, a Battalion Intelligence Officer and a Company Commander. He went for his Young Officers Course from January to March, 1979. He was promoted to Lieutenant on 1 June of the same year. He was posted to Depot Nigerian Army, Zaria in April 1980 as an Instructor/ Company 2IC. He was promoted to Substantive Captain in June, 1983 and posted to 21st Mechanized Battalion Minna in September of the same year as a Company Commander. He was prematurely, compulsorily retired after the ouster of his father's government. He was retired on 6 February 1984.

== Later career ==
After his retirement from the military in 1984, Muhammad Bala Shagari founded Shag Nigeria Limited, and later founded Hamadah Shipping Services alongside Alhaji Aliko Dangote and Sen.Usman Albishir, among others, in 1989. He was chairman of Hamadah Shipping Services for a time.

Prior to the Third Nigerian Republic, he was a member of the constituent assembly representing Yabo constituency, formerly consisting of Yabo, Shagari and Tambuwal Local Governments in 1988. Although, the Third Nigerian Republic never got off the ground due to the annulment of the Nigerian presidential election, 1993. He was later appointed as the director of the Nigeria Agricultural Cooperative and Rural Development Bank (NACB) in 1993.

He was also the chairman of the Sokoto State Rural Electrification Board and Sokoto State Sports Council under the subsequent military government in the State. In 1997, after Shagari became a Local Government, he was appointed as the District Head of Shagari by Sultan Muhammadu Maccido. In 2009, he became a member of the Federal Capital Territory Judicial Service Committee. He is presently a member of the board of trustees of the PZ Cusons Foundation, a member of the Sokoto State Education Trust Fund, and a member of the Board of Governors of the Aduvie International Schools.

== Personal life ==
Muhammad Bala Shagari is married with eight children. Among them is an activist, Bello Bala Shagari. He is himself the eldest son of President Shehu Shagari.

Mallam Shagari is an enthusiastic polo player and a one time captain of the Zaria Polo Club. He was once a winner of the prestigious Georgian Cup of Kaduna Polo Club. As a sports lover, he also plays fives, and was the president of the Fives Federation in Nigeria.
