= National Youth Council of Nigeria =

Nigerian youth organisation

- Abbreviation: NYCN
- Formation: 1964; 62 years ago
- Type: Youth Organisation
- Location: Abuja, FCT, Nigeria
- President: Amb Sukubo Sara-Igbe Sukubo
- Website: nationalyouthcouncilofnigeria.org

The National Youth Council of Nigeria (NYCN) was established in 1964. It is charged with the responsibility of policy formulation and implementation on issues relating to youth development in Nigeria. It is the umbrella body and the mouthpiece of the Nigerian Youths. It was established and given legal recognition in 1990. The NYCN has three branches; the National, Zonal and the State chapters. The NYCN is also affiliated to the World Assembly of Youth, and the Pan-African Youth Union. It has the Ministry for Youth and Sports Development as its supervisory body. The NYCN body has been instrumental to many empowerment, scholarship and support programmes.

== Structure ==
Youth, according to the youth policy, are people, between the ages of 18 and 35. The National Youth Council of Nigeria has 36 state chapters plus the FCT, and 774 local government branches. All chapters are led by a chairman while the local government branches are led by coordinators. The NYCN is managed and governed by 25 National Executive Committee (NEC) members 2025 ratified and 18 directorates, headed by the council president.

== Leadership ==
The Youth Council is a non‐governmental, non‐partisan, and not‐for‐profit organisation. The council comprises the National Executive Committee (NEC) of 25 members, led by a president and 37 State Chairmen with Local Government Coordinators. The NEC members are democratically elected by their respective state chapters and affiliated voluntary youth organisations. The National Youth Council of Nigeria is a major stakeholder in the implementation of the National Youth Policy.

As an umbrella organization for youth NGOs and youth organizations across the country, the NYCN pursues democratic norms at all times, embraces the principles of accountability and, transparency in all its conduct, and initiates and executes activities that align with the goals of the National Youth Policy
