= Soun of Ogbomosho =

King of Ogbomoso Kingdom in Oyo state, Nigeria

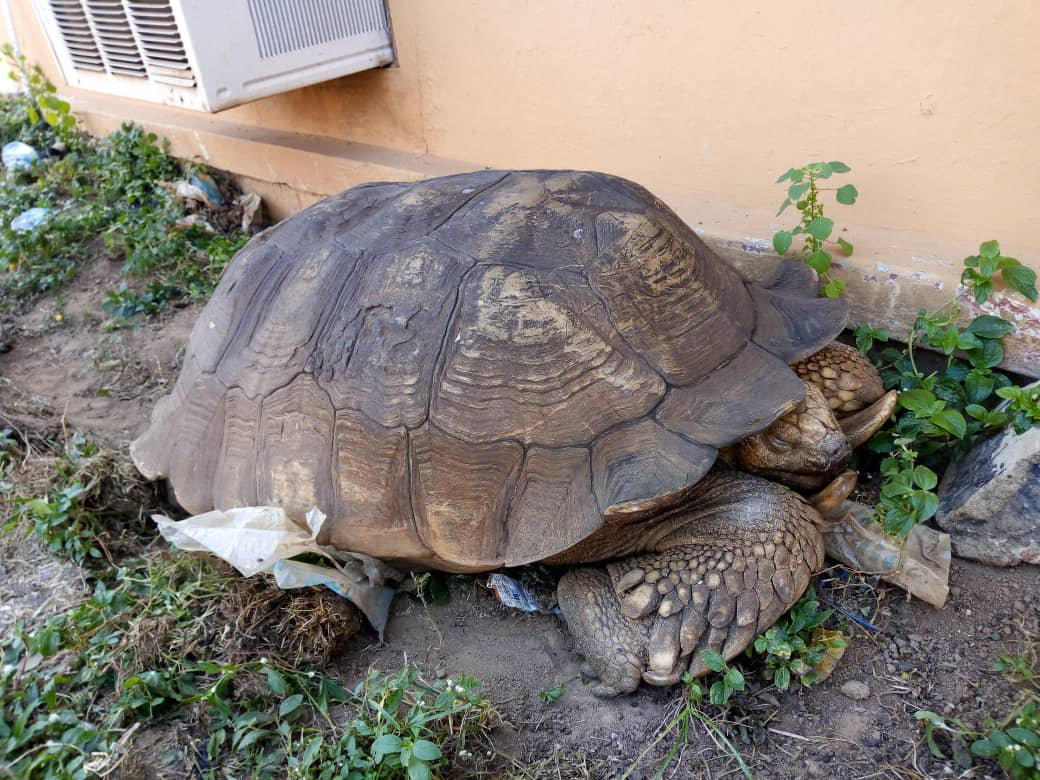
King's tortoise Alagba Soun Ogbomoso, 🐢

Soun of Ogbomoso is the official title given to the paramount ruler of Ogbomoso kingdom. The current and the 28th Soun of Ogbomoso is Ọba Ghandi Afọlábí Oladunni Ọláoyè, Orumógege III, a descendant of the 9th Soun of Ogbomoso, the late Oba Laoye Orumogege from Baiyewuwon ruling house of Aremo House, Ode-Aremo, Ogbomoso. He was crowned on the 21 December 2023 by the governor of Oyo State, Seyi Makinde.

== List of Souns of Ogbomoso ==
1- SOUN OLABANJO OGUNLOLA OGUNDIRAN (1659–1669)

2- SOUN LAKALE AREMU, SON OF OGUNLOLA (1669–1679)

3- SOUN KEKERE-ESUO, SON OF OGUNLOLA (1679–1690)

4- SOUN EIYE AGANNAGANNA, SON OF OGUNLOLA (1691–1713)

5- SOUN ARAPASOPO ERINSABA ALAMU JOGIORO, SON OF OGUNLOLA (1714–1770).

6- SOUN OLUSIMI (IKUMOYEDE) AJAO, SON OF JOGIORO (1770–1797)

7- SOUN OLOGOLO ORISA MATU, SON OF JOGIORO (1797–1811)

8- SOUN OLUKAN ADENIYI, GRAND SON OF LAKALE (1811)

9- SOUN TOYEJE AKANNI ALEBIOSU AARE ONA KAKANFO, SON OF IKUMOYEDE (1811–1825)

10- SOUN OLUWUSI AREMU, SON OF IKUMOYEDE (1825–1840)

11- SOUN JAYEOLA BAYEWUWON KELEBE, "AARE AROLOFIN" ALAO, SON OF IKUMOYEDE (1840–1842)

12- SOUN IDOWU BOLANTAN ADIGUN, SON OF IKUMOYEDE (1842–1845)

13- SOUN OGUNLABI ODUNARO, SON OF IKUMOYEDE (1845–1860)

14- SOUN OJO OLANIPEKUN ABURUMAKU AARE ONA KAKANFO, SON OF TOYEJE (1860–1869)

15- SOUN ALAMU OTUNLA (1869)

16- SOUN GBAGUNGBOYE AJAMASA AJAGUNGBADE I, SON OF OLUWUSI (1869–1871)

17- SOUN OLAOYE ATANDA ORUMOGEGE I, SON OF BAYEWUWON (1871–1901)

18- SOUN MAJEUNGBASAN AJIBOLA ELEPO I, SON OF BOLANTAN (1901–1908)

19- SOUN ADEGOKE OLAYODE I, SON OF ODUNARO (1908–1914)

20- SOUN OLAREWAJU ITABIYI I, SON OF ABURUMAKU (1914–1916)

21- SOUN BELLO AFOLABI ALABI OYEWUMI AJAGUNGBADE II, SON OF GBAGUNGBOYE (1916 - February 18, 1940)

22- SOUN AMAO OYETUNDE, SON OF OYEKOLA (1940– June 12 1944)

23- SOUN LAWANI OKE OLANIPEKUN ORUMOGEGE II, SON OF OLAOYE (October 16, 1944 – March 19, 1952)

24- OBA OLATUNJI ALAO ELEPO II, SON OF AJIBOLA (1952–1966)

25- OBA EMMANUEL OLAJIDE OLAYODE II, SON OF OLAYODE (1966–1969)

26- OBA SALAMI AJIBOYE ITABIYI II, SON OF OLAREWAJU ITABIYI (June 4, 1972 – June 2, 1973)

27- OBA JIMOH OYEWUMI AJAGUNGBADE III, SON OF AFOLABI OYEWUMI (October 24, 1973 – December 12,02021)

28- OBA GHANDI AFOLABI OLAOYE ORUMOGEGE III (September 8, 2023–Present)
