= Shehu Shagari =

President of Nigeria from 1979 to 1983

Alhaji Shehu Shagari GCFR
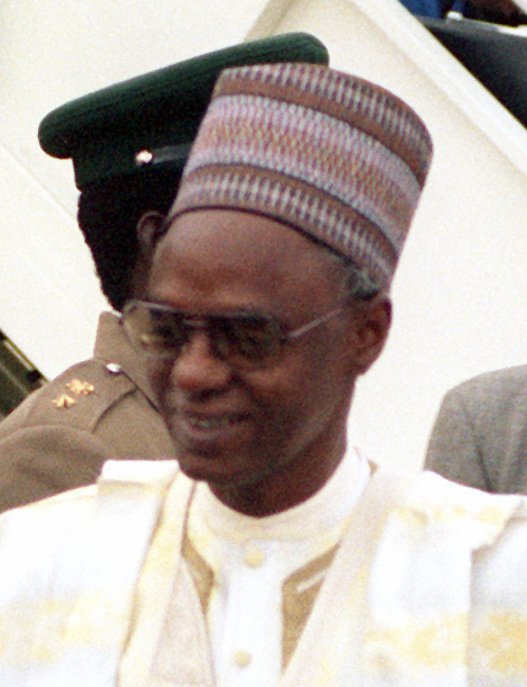
- Shagari in 1980

6th President of Nigeria
- In office 1 October 1979 – 31 December 1983
- Vice President: Alex Ekwueme
- Preceded by: Olusegun Obasanjo as Military Head of State of Nigeria
- Succeeded by: Muhammadu Buhari as Military Head of State of Nigeria
Ministerial offices
Federal Commissioner for Finance
In office 1971–1975
President	Yakubu Gowon
Preceded by	Obafemi Awolowo
Succeeded by	Asumoh Ete Ekukinam
Federal Commissioner for Economic Development, Rehabilitation, and Reconstruction
In office 1970–1971
President	Yakubu Gowon
Federal Minister of Works
In office 1965–1966
Prime Minister	Abubakar Tafawa Balewa
Federal Minister of Internal Affairs
In office 1962–1965
Prime Minister	Abubakar Tafawa Balewa
Preceded by	Usman Sarki
Succeeded by	Shettima Ali Monguno
Federal Minister of Pensions
In office 1960–1962
Prime Minister	Abubakar Tafawa Balewa
Preceded by	Musa Yar'Adua
Federal Minister of Economic Development
In office 1959–1960
Prime Minister	Abubakar Tafawa Balewa
Federal Minister of Commerce and Industries
In office 1958–1959
Prime Minister	Abubakar Tafawa Balewa
Succeeded by

Personal details
- Born: 25 February 1925 Shagari, Northern Region, British Nigeria
- Died: 28 December 2018 (aged 93) Abuja, Nigeria
- Party: National Party of Nigeria
- Other political affiliations: Northern People's Congress (1951–1966)
- Spouses: Amina Shagari; Hadiza Dawaiya (m. 1957) Aisha Shagari (died 2001)
- Children: At least 3; including Muhammad
- Relatives: Bello Bala Shagari (grandson)
- Education: Barewa College; Teachers Training College, Zaria
- Occupation: Politician; teacher

Shehu Usman Aliyu Shagari GCFR (Hausa pronunciation; 25 February 1925 – 28 December 2018) was a Nigerian politician who was the first democratically elected president of Nigeria, after the transfer of power by military head of state General Olusegun Obasanjo in 1979, which gave rise to the Second Nigerian Republic.

He briefly worked as a teacher before entering politics in 1951; and was elected into the House of Representatives in 1954. At various times between 1958 through independence of Nigeria in 1960 and 1975, he held a cabinet post as a federal commissioner. During these periods, Shagari made significant contributions to various sectors of the Nigerian economy. As Minister of Works, he played a key role in infrastructure development. As Minister of Economic Development, he was instrumental in formulating Nigeria's post-independence National Economic Plan, and as Federal Commissioner (now Minister) for Finance, he oversaw the launch of the Naira. As president, he prioritized economic development, infrastructure expansion, and industrialization, commissioning the Ajaokuta Steel Mill, the largest steel project in Africa, to lay the foundation for Nigeria's industrial growth. His administration faced challenges, including economic downturns and political instability. His tenure ended with a military coup in 1983.

== Early years ==
Shehu Usman Shagari was born on 25 February 1925 in Shagari to a Sunni Muslim Fulani family. The town of Shagari was founded by his great-grandfather, Ahmadu Rufa'i. He was raised in a polygamous family, and was the sixth child born into the family. His father, Aliyu Shagari, was the Magajin Shagari (magaji means village head). Prior to becoming Magajin Shagari, Aliyu was a farmer, trader and herder. However, due to traditional rites that prevented rulers from participating in business, Aliyu relinquished some of his trading interests when he became the Magaji. Aliyu died five years after Shehu's birth, and Shehu's elder brother, Bello, briefly took on his father's mantle as Magajin Shagari.

Shagari started his education in a Quranic school and then went to live with relatives at a nearby town, where from 1931 to 1935 he attended Yabo elementary school. In 1936–1940, he went to Sokoto for middle school, and then from 1941 to 1944 he attended Barewa College. Between 1944 and 1952, Shagari matriculated at the Teachers Training College, in Zaria, Kaduna, Nigeria. From 1953 to 1958, Shagari got a job as a visiting teacher at Sokoto Province. He was also a member of the Federal Scholarship Board from 1954 to 1958.

== Early political career ==
=== Entry into politics ===
Shehu Usman Shagari entered politics in 1951 when he became the secretary of the Northern People's Congress in Sokoto, Nigeria, a position he held until 1956. However, his early political activities started in 1945, when as a teacher he founded a youth group called Youth Social Circle in Sokoto and became its secretary. The organization became one of the smaller groups that came together to be part of Northern People's Congress (NPC), which was founded in 1948.

In 1948, when Dr. Nnamdi Azikiwe of the NCNC was touring Nigeria to raise funds to send a delegation to London to ask the Colonial Office to abrogate Richard's constitution as undemocratic, Shehu Shagari who was a keen reader of the West-African Pilot paper was the only man of Sokoto origin to attend this meeting. When the British provincial educational officer was informed of Shagari's attendance, his salary increment was postponed that year to serve as a punishment.

The West African Pilot was banned in the northern region schools, and Shagari wrote for it an article for its revival in 1948. At the same time, Shagari had started advocating for the departure of colonial rule that he had produced a Hausa pamphlet carrying poetry which he named "Anti Colonialist" and put it in circulation. In 1950, Shagari, a young teacher at 25, was nominated by a British district officer H.A.S Johnson to participate in the Ibadan Conference to debate the Richards Constitution.

=== Election to parliament ===
In 1954, Shehu Shagari was elected into his first public office as a member of the federal House of Representative for Sokoto west. In 1958, Shagari was appointed parliamentary secretary (he left the post in 1959) to the Nigerian prime minister, Sir Abubakar Tafawa Balewa, and that year he also served as the federal minister for commerce and industries.

=== Ministerial appointments ===
From 1959 to 1960, Shagari was the pioneer federal minister for economic development of independent Nigeria, where his ministry was responsible for drawing the 1962–1968 development plan. Shagari's Ministry of Economic Development was also responsible for the establishment of the Niger-Delta Development Board. From 1960 to 1962, he was the federal minister for pensions, which undertook the mission of Nigerianization of the civil service. From 1962 to 1965, Shagari was made the federal minister for internal affairs. From 1965 up until the first military coup in January 1966, Shagari was the federal minister for works and had executed many important projects, including Eko Bridge Lagos, which was the first major contract of the German construction firm Julius Berger in Nigeria, and the completion of the Niger Bridge which was commissioned in 1966 by Prime Minister Sir Abubakar Tafawa Balewa. In 1967, he was appointed the secretary for Sokoto Province Education Development Fund. From 1968 to 1969, Shagari was given a state position in the North-Western State as Commissioner for Establishments.

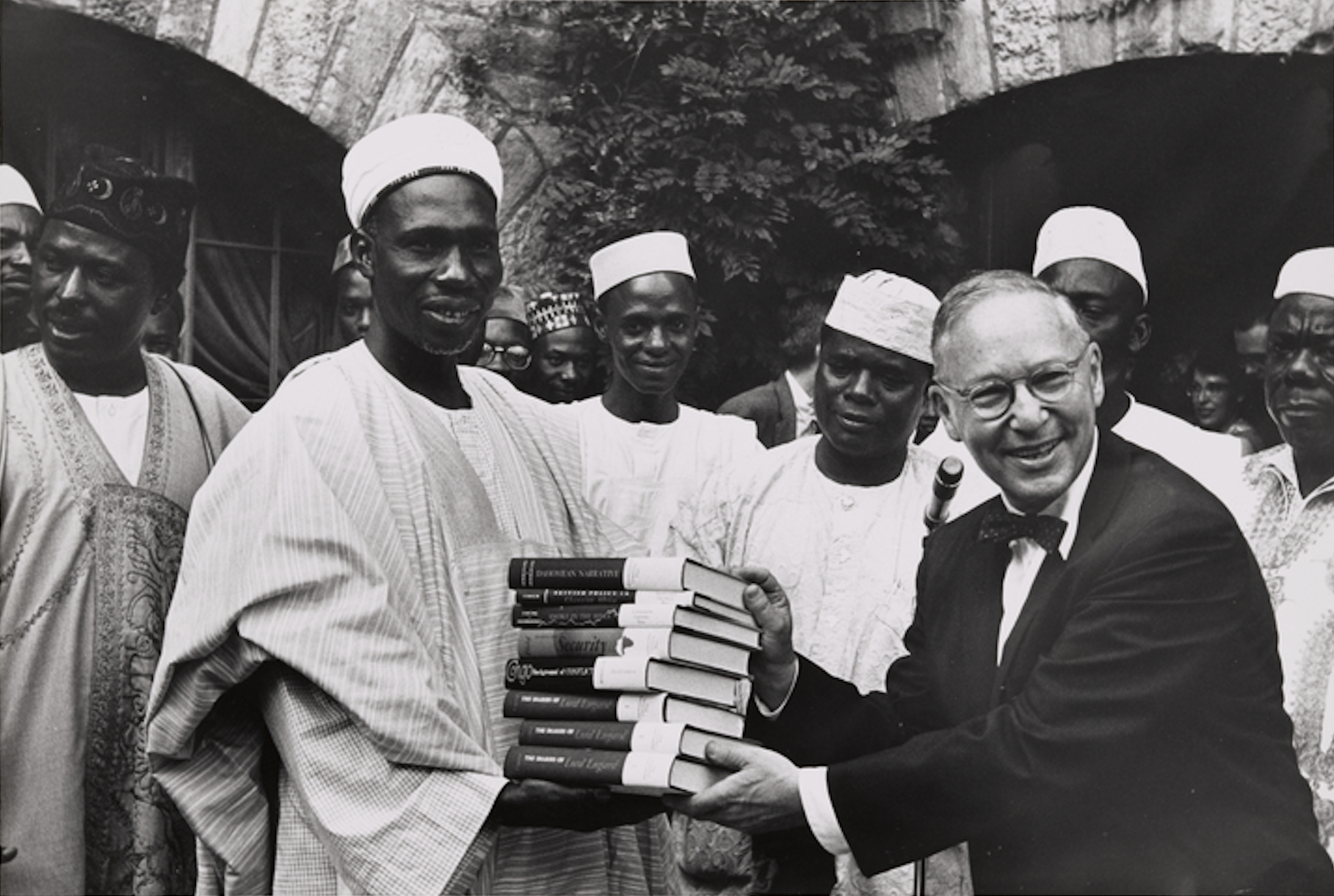
Shagari (middle) with Prime Minister Tafawa Balewa who is receiving a stack of books from American anthropologist Melville J. Herskovits at Northwestern University in 1961

As a member of the Parliament and a federal minister, Shagari led and was part of several Nigerian missions abroad. As Minister of Economic Development, he was a member of the Nigerian delegation to the Tangiers Conference of the U.N. Economic Commission for Africa (ECA), which was led by Minister of Finance Chief Festus Okotie Eboh. In 1961, he led the delegation to the tenth anniversary of Libya's independence. The same year, he was at the GATT ministerial conference in Geneva, where he raised the issue of European Economic Community's (ECC) discrimination against African countries like Nigeria who were not then, associated with EEC. The same year, he led a delegation to the Commonwealth Parliamentary Conference (CPA) in London. He became the chairman of the next CPA Conference held in Lagos between October and November 1962.

In 1962, he led the delegation to ECA meeting in Addis Ababa to the commission's third meeting, the first which Nigeria attended as a full member where he strongly urged for price stabilization arrangement for tropical products. In 1963, Shagari was Nigeria's delegate to CPA meeting in Kuala Lumpur. Then in December 1965, just when Ian Smith made the Unilateral Declaration of Independence, Shehu Shagari attended the CPA conference in Wellington, New Zealand where he criticized and made an explicit denunciation of Ian Smith's declaration. In the same meeting. Shagari also expressed concerns about Rhodesia now Zimbabwe, where he criticizes the Britain colonial policies and the handling of Rhodesia's situation. Shehu Shagari's speech at the CPA conference was so significant and far-reaching that he had received many commendations from other delegates. Shehu Shagari had a great impact on politics during his tenure.

He also made headlines on New Zealand's Christchurch Star of 4 December 1965, and The Morning Post of Wellington.

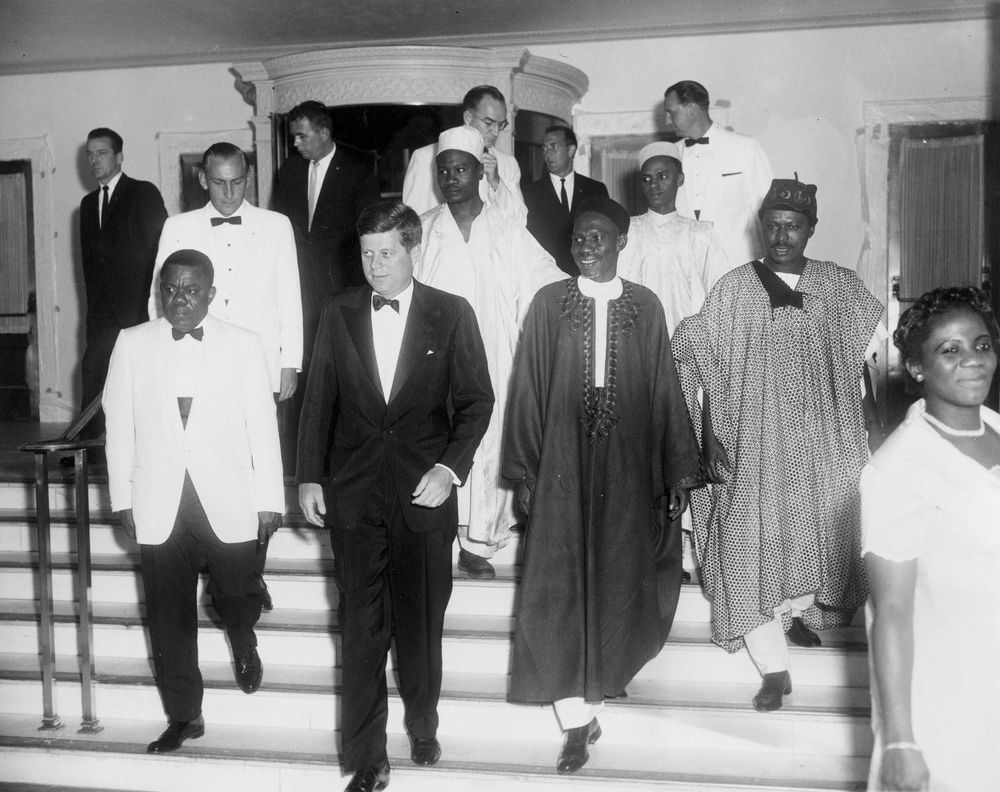
Shagari (back row on the right) at the White House with Prime Minister Abubakar Tafawa Balewa and US President John F. Kennedy (1961)

He also led a delegation to the first session of the Economic Social Commission of the Organisation of African Unity (OAU). Shagari also represented the prime minister on different occasions, including when President Gamal Abdel Nasser of Egypt invited Nigerian prime minister Abubakar to inspect Egypt's security arrangements. He also represented Prime Minister Tafawa Balewa at Winston Churchill's funeral.

== Pre-presidency ==
=== Fall of the First Republic ===
After the 1966 Nigerian coup d'état, Shagari was among the government officials who handed over government to the military leadership of Maj. Gen. Aguiyi Ironsi. He returned to Sokoto to promote education. He served as the executive secretary of the Sokoto Province Education Development Fund in 1967, where he built many provincial schools. He was later appointed Commissioner of Establishment and Training and also served briefly as Commissioner for Education in the defunct North Western States before he was invited to serve under the Federal Military Government of Gen. Yakubu Gowon.

=== Minister after the Civil War ===
Following the Nigerian Civil War, from 1970 to 1971, Shagari was appointed by the military head of state General Yakubu Gowon as the federal commissioner for economic development, rehabilitation, and reconstruction which worked to carry out reconciliation policy of Gowon's Government. Shagari began reconstruction and rehabilitation of schools, hospitals, and other infrastructure in the South East. He also undertook the mission of persuading South Easterners to rejoin the civil service while negotiating the release of Biafran political prisoners after a letter written to him by Pius Okigbo was smuggled for him from Enugu Prisons.

From 1971 to 1975 he served as the federal commissioner (a position now called minister) of finance. During his tenure as the commissioner of finance for Nigeria, Shagari was also a governor for the World Bank and a member of the International Monetary Fund (IMF) committee of twenty. Shagari as the federal minister of finance also launched the present Nigerian currency naira. In 1976, Shagari initiated the Nigeria Trust Fund in African Development Bank with the sum of $100 million in order to assist poor African countries to finance some of their developmental projects.

As a minister under Gowon, Shagari also undertook a peace mission to mediate between Julius Nyerere of Tanzania and Idi Amin of Uganda in order to avert Uganda–Tanzania War by withdrawing their troops from the borders. After serving under Gen. Yakubu Gowon, he returned to Sokoto again to serve as the chairman of the Sokoto State Urban Development Authority (SUDA), during which he started building Sokoto Modern Market. In the wake of local government reforms under the Obasanjo-led government. Shagari was elected as the counsellor of Yabo Local Government in 1976.

=== Election to the presidency ===
Afterward, he served in the 1977–1978 constituent assembly which drafted the 1979 constitution. In 1978, Shehu Shagari was a founding member of the National Party of Nigeria. In 1979 Shagari was chosen by the party as the presidential candidate for general election that year, which he won the 1979 election with the help of his campaign manager, Umaru Dikko. The campaign had the support of many prominent politicians in the North and among southern minorities. The party's motto was "One Nation, One Destiny" and was seen as the party best representing Nigeria's diversity.

== Presidency ==
Seal of the president of the Federal Republic of Nigeria

=== Economics ===
During the oil boom, Shagari made agriculture, industry, housing and transportation the major economic goals of his administration.

==== Agriculture ====
Shagari's government embarked on a "Green Revolution", distributing seed and fertilizer to farmers to increase nationwide productivity in farming, In Agriculture. The aim was to foster the use of modern machinery in farming. This initiative favoured large scale farmers in order to produce mass products. He also commissioned the Bakalori Dam in Sokoto State, South Chad Irrigation Scheme, Borno State, Kafin Zaki Dam Bauchi State, Ogun River Dam, Ogun State, Dadin Kowa Dam Bauchi State, Goronyo Dam Sokoto State, and Zobe Dam, Kastina State.

==== Industry ====
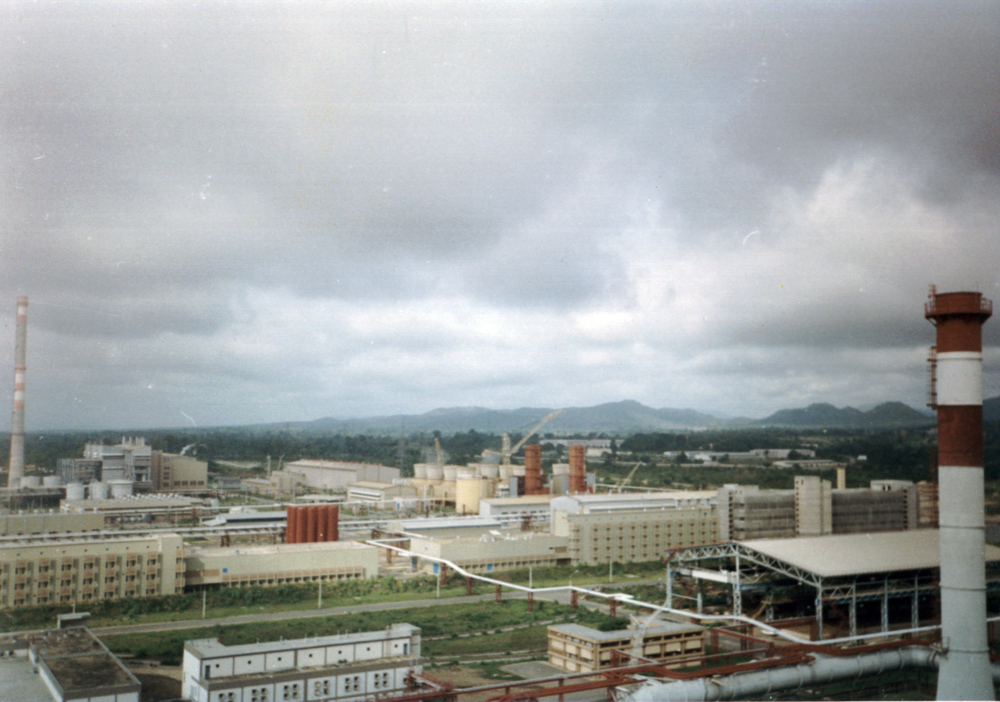
Ajaokuta Steel Mill

In 1980, with the oil revenue, Shagari finished building the Kaduna refinery, which started operating that year. Also with the oil revenue, Shagari started the construction of Ajaokuta Steel Mill which was near completion by 1983. It is the biggest steel project ever embarked in Africa at the time of its construction. The steelworks has been called the "bedrock of Nigeria's industrialization".

Shagari completed the Delta Steel complex in 1982. In 1983, Shagari created the Aluminium Smelter Company of Nigeria at Ikot Abasi. Three other Steel Rolling Mills where built, they include the ones in Osogbo, Katsina and Jos. However, Shagari reduced the share of oil royalties and rents to state of origin from 30 to 2 percent. Shagari also established a Petroleum Training Institute.

There were also motor vehicle plants such as ANAMMCO in Anambra commissioned in 1980, The Volkswagen Assembly Plantvin Oyo State, Peugeot Automobile in Kaduna State, FIAT in Kano State and Styer in Bauchi State.

==== Housing ====
In housing, Shagari had the target of building 200,000 housing units, but by June 1983, only thirty thousand (32,000) units had been completed. Despite its shortcomings, it is the largest public housing project Nigeria has ever seen.

==== Transportation ====
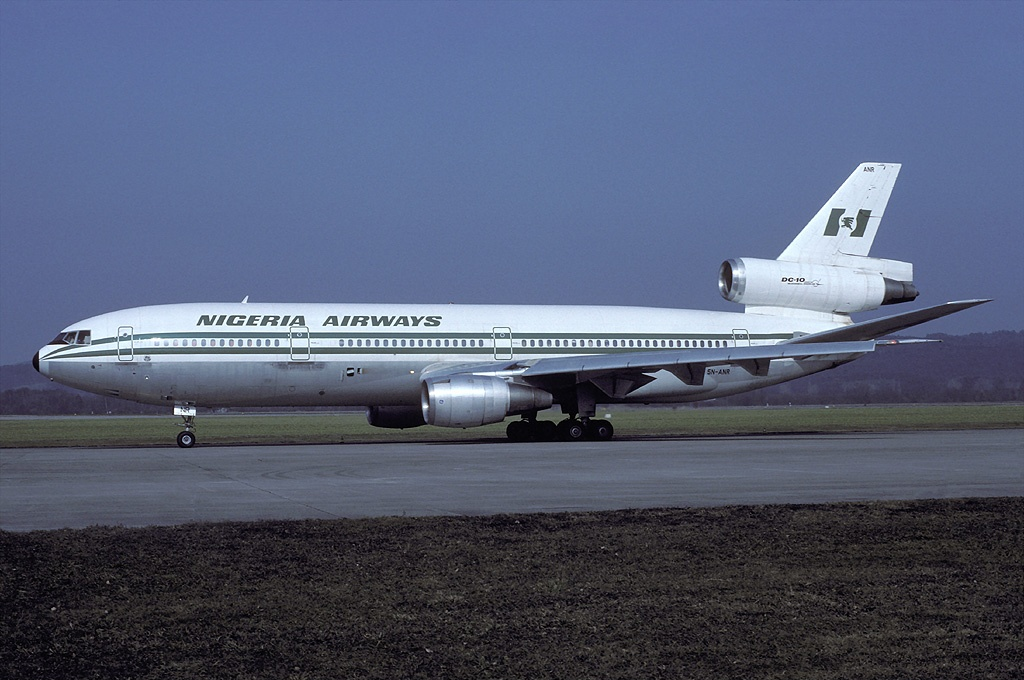
Nigeria Airways (now defunct) saw its golden years during the Second Republic under President Shehu Shagari

In transportation, he launched many road networks across the country including the ones leading to the new Federal Capital Abuja. Others notable road networks constructed include: Badagry-Sokoto, Lagos-Kano, Port Harcourt-Enugu, Kano-Bauchi, Warri-Okene, Abuja-Kaduna, Calabar-Ikom, Yola-Maiduguri, Mokwa-Bidda, Abuja-Keffi, Effurun-Patani-Kaiama, Jibia-Katsina, Kano-Kari and Potiskum-Maiduguri.

Shagari also built and improved some seaports including Sapele Ports Complex and started Federal Ocean Terminal in Port Harcourt. Inland ports were also built and modernized and a new river port was commissioned at Onitsha and another modern river port to serve the Ajaokuta Steel Mill.

In aviation, Shagari created the Ministry of Aviation and built three airports in Minna, Bauchi and Akure. New passenger aircraft were also acquired for Nigerian Airways including eight Boeing 737s and four Airbus A310s during which Nigeria had the largest airline network in Africa.

=== Finances ===
The fall in oil prices that began in 1981 affected the finances of the Nigerian government. Shagari "refused to embrace" structural adjustment from the IMF and World Bank as the crisis progressed, and initiated an Economic Stabilization Program to help protect the country against a hard landing from prior highs of the 1970s and to steer the economy towards positive growth. The key objectives of the program were to limit import licenses, reduce government spending, and raise custom duties. However, the result of the stabilization program was minimal.

=== Corruption and Anti Corruption Efforts ===
Even though Shehu Shagari was exonerated from personally being involved in corrupt practices, the Second Republic was plagued by allegations of corruption, including allegations of electoral fraud in the 1983 election. This, coupled with a decline in world oil prices, and a deterioration in the national finances, hardship, leading to the regime becoming deeply unpopular with citizens.

However, before removal from office, in his second term, Shagari made attempts to curb corruption through the new Ministry of National Guidance under Yusuf Maitama Sule, which was solely created for that purpose. A new program was introduced called Ethical Revolution which has the famous War Against Indiscipline which was launched under Gen. Muhammadu Buhari among its Initiatives. The ministry only lasted for three months before the 1983 coup. In his short lived second term, Shagari retained only 7 of the 45 ministers from the previous administration to demonstrate his commitment in fighting corruption. However, that did not convince the military junta which took over.

=== In government ===
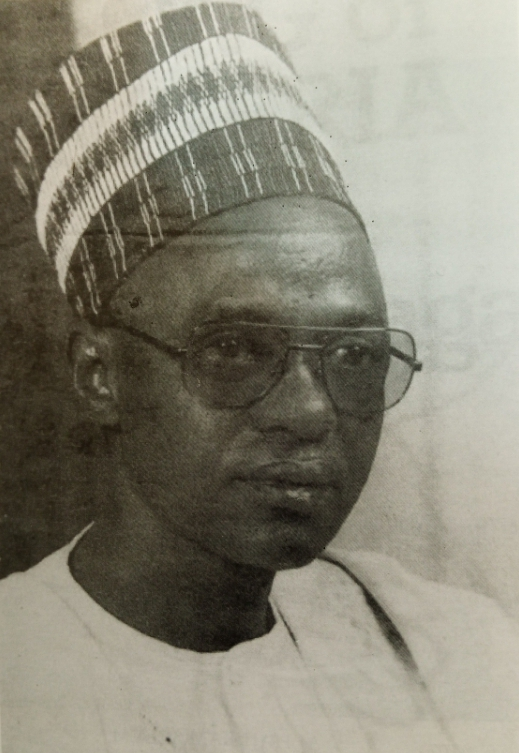
At early ages.

Shagari's government has recorded a number of successes in education. In his four-year term, there was a dramatic improvement in secondary schools and teachers in teaching colleges multiplied. In 1981 a mass literacy campaign was launched, and in 1982 a 6–3–3–5 system of education was introduced. Shagari's government also built several tertiary institutions in Nigeria. New universities of technology where established in Bauchi, Benue, Adamawa, Ondo, Imo, and Osun States. They are the Federal University of Technology Yola; Federal University of Technology Akure; Federal University of Technology Owerri; Federal University of Technology Minna; Federal University of Agriculture, Abeokuta; and Abubakar Tafawa Balewa University. Shagari's administration also upgraded seven other existing colleges of education to degree-awarding institutions in Abraka, Ondo, Kano, Ado Ekiti, Bidda, Port Harcourt, and Zaria and also established eight other federal polytechnics in Ado Ekiti, Bidda, Bauchi, Idah, Uwana (Afikpo), Yola and Ilaro. The Federal Open University of Nigeria was also established during the end of Shagari's administration in 1981. It also offered scholarships for students who are studying abroad.

During his campaign, Shagari selected a woman from Imo State as his running mate, to be his vice president. However, she declined after previously accepting, due to a lack of support from stakeholders in Southern Eastern Nigeria where the vice presidential ticket was zoned to, it was the closest Nigerian women have ever been to the presidency. Nevertheless, the first female ministers and diplomats in Nigeria were appointed by Shagari. He appointed Ebun Oyagbola as Minister of National Planning and later Ambassador to the United Mexican States of Panama, Costa Rica and Guatemalan and Mrs. Janet Akinrinade as State Minister of Internal Affairs and two other female ministers Mrs. Asinobi and Mrs. Ivasi. Similarly, Mrs. Elizabeth Ogbon was appointed Consul General to Hamburg Germany, Mrs. R Mohammed was Nigeria Ambassador to Botswana and Zimbabwe. Whereas, several young people had joined Shagari's government and ministers and advisers. One of the famous ones is Prof. Pat Utomi, who was 29 when he was appointed Economic Adviser. Ministers appointed in their early 30s are Audu Innocent Ogbeh (32) and Bello Maitama Yusuf (34). Many of the cabinet ministers were below 50 years of age.

=== National affairs ===
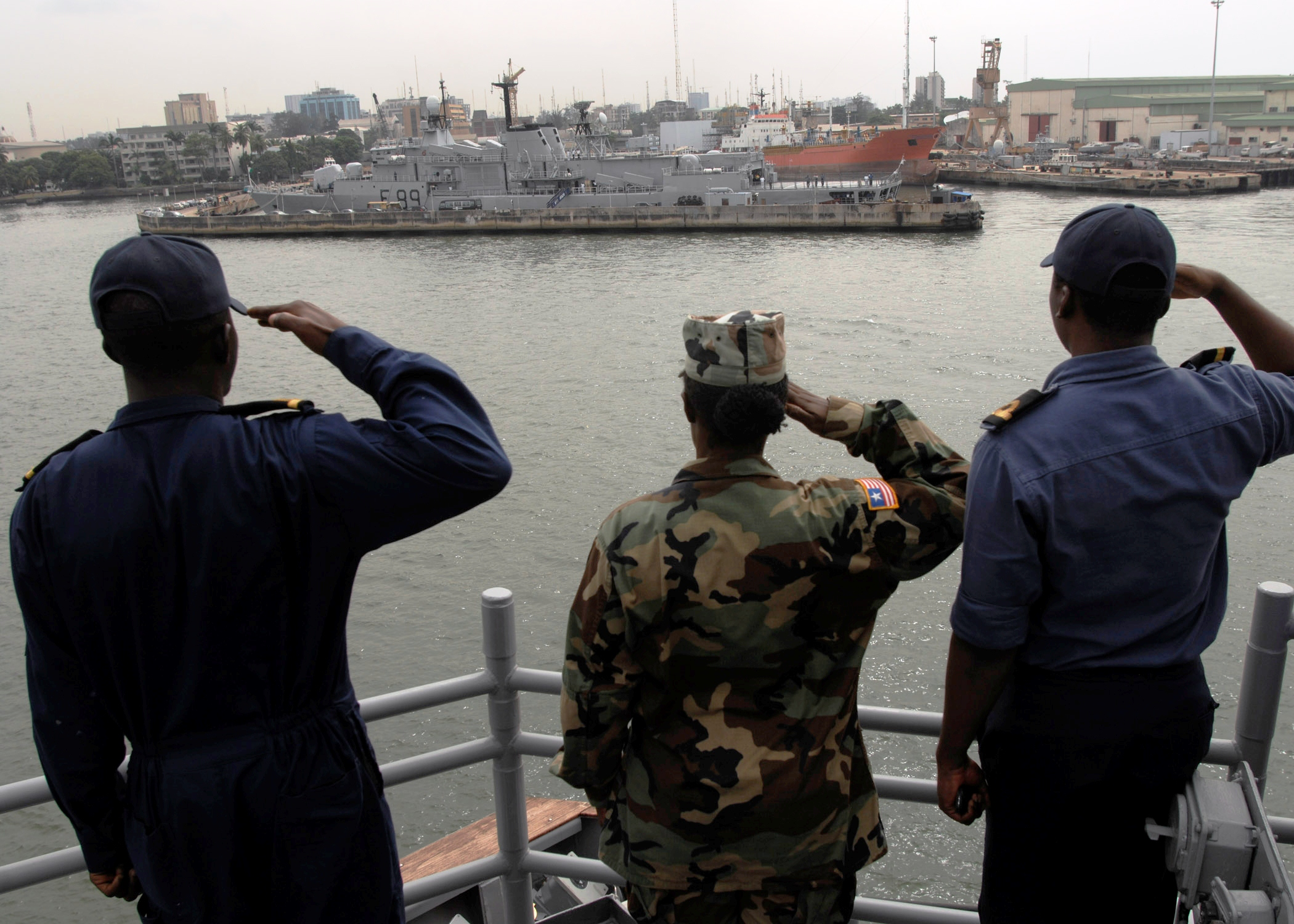
NNS ARADU

Military development

The one-year term Shagari administration saw a rapid growth of the capacity of the Nigerian Armed Forces. Nigeria acquired most of its sophisticated weapons during this time until the recent upgrades and acquisitions. The military procurement under Shagari remains the highest in Nigeria's history. They include the alpha Fighter Jets, the MIG Fighter Jets, 3 C-130H-30 Hercules transport aircraft, helicopter gunships among others. NNS Aradu (F89) which is the most sophisticated ship of the Nigeria Navy was acquired during his time.

==== Maitatsine and Kano 1980 riot ====
The Kano 1980 riot was a riot in Kano, Nigeria, led by Maitatsine, a heretical preacher, and his followers. It was the first major religious conflict in post-colonial Kano. Over 4,177 civilians, 100 policemen and about 35 military personnel were killed, including Maitatsine himself, and is generally regarded as marking the beginning of the Yan Tatsine. Because of this, there was widespread impression that Nigeria's security and economy was threatened by illegal aliens and this belief was fueled by the fact that other West African nationals had aided in armed robberies. Illegal aliens from Niger, Chad, Cameroon, Mali and Burkina Faso along with over 6,000 Nigerian Muslim fanatics killed over 100 policemen while injuring 100 policemen. The army was called and alleviated the situation before the fanatics could overrun the country. However, official sources state that illegal aliens did not cause the trouble.

==== Deportation of migrants ====
In 1983, Shagari issued an executive order mandating immigrants without proper immigration documents to leave the country or they would be arrested according to the law. The order was in alleged response to the religious disturbances that had engulfed parts of the country in 1980 (Kano 1980 Riots) and 1981. Most of the immigrants were West Africans and mainly Ghanaians. Over 2 million men, women and children were affected.

==== Federal Capital Territory ====
Prior to Shagari's presidency, Abuja was merely a virgin land with no development. Shehu Shagari laid the first infrastructure of the new city, the first of which is the road from Suleja to the site of the capital. Other infrastructures include electricity, waters, and roads.

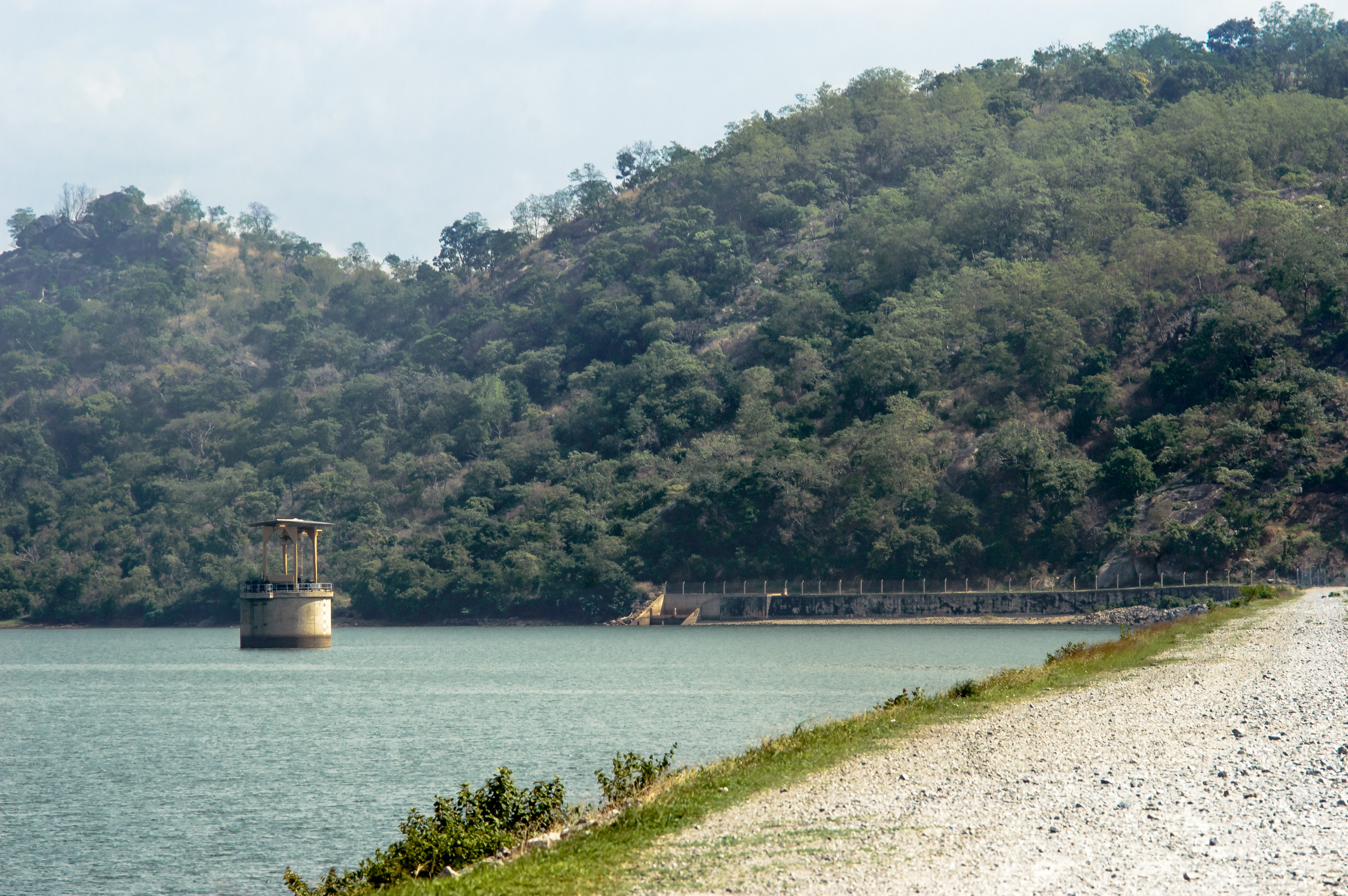
Usman Dam Abuja

The Usman Dam was built in 1980, which was mean to meet the water needs of the future city. The city was also connected to the national grid during that time. A new airport runway was also put in place which is now improved and upgraded as Nnamdi Azikiwe International Airport. Other infrastructures include 5,000 housing for federal workers, a statehouse secretariate and a presidential guest house (Aguda House), Statehouse, National Assembly and National Mosques were also being built, 3 five star hotels, schools, hospitals, other constructions and some major road to into the city were in the works during the Shagari administration.

By 1983, Abuja had already become a functional city that council meetings and national celebrations were held there. When Shagari was removed, he was away in the city for a vacation. Abuja has since become a megacity and is now Nigeria Federal Capital Territory. Abuja was described as The Single Most Ambitious Urban Design Project of the 20th Century by a renowned architect Nnamdi Elleh.

=== Foreign affairs ===
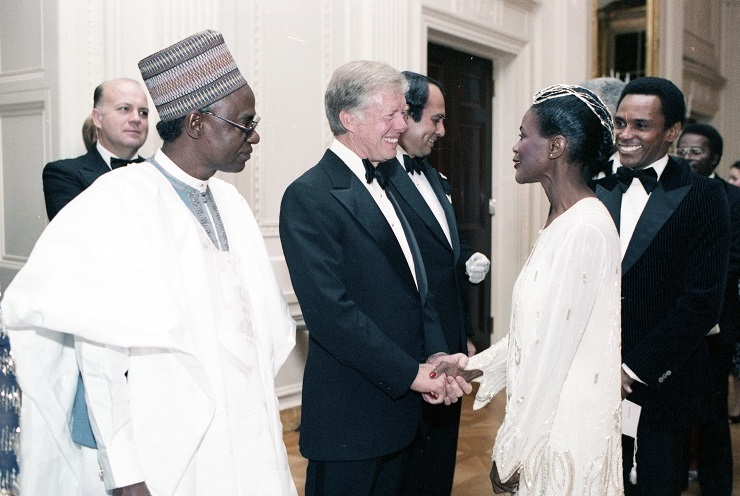
President Shagari alongside President Jimmy Carter and Cicely Tyson at the white house

Shagari's presidency maintained Nigeria's foreign policy since 1960, which was centred on Africa. Shagari himself was not new to foreign relations as he has led several Nigerian delegations to foreign missions since independence. His presidency advocated and acted rigorously against apartheid in South African and white minority rule in Zambia and Zimbabwe. The liberation struggle was a task to be carried out by the Shagari presidency. He has severally made his position known everywhere he was including during his state visits to the United Kingdom and the United States where President Jimmy Carter had congratulated him on the independence of Zimbabwe. Correspondence between President Shagari and Prime Minister Margaret Thatcher shows that he has put so much pressure on Britain concerning the independence of Zimbabwe to the extent of risking the relationship between both countries.

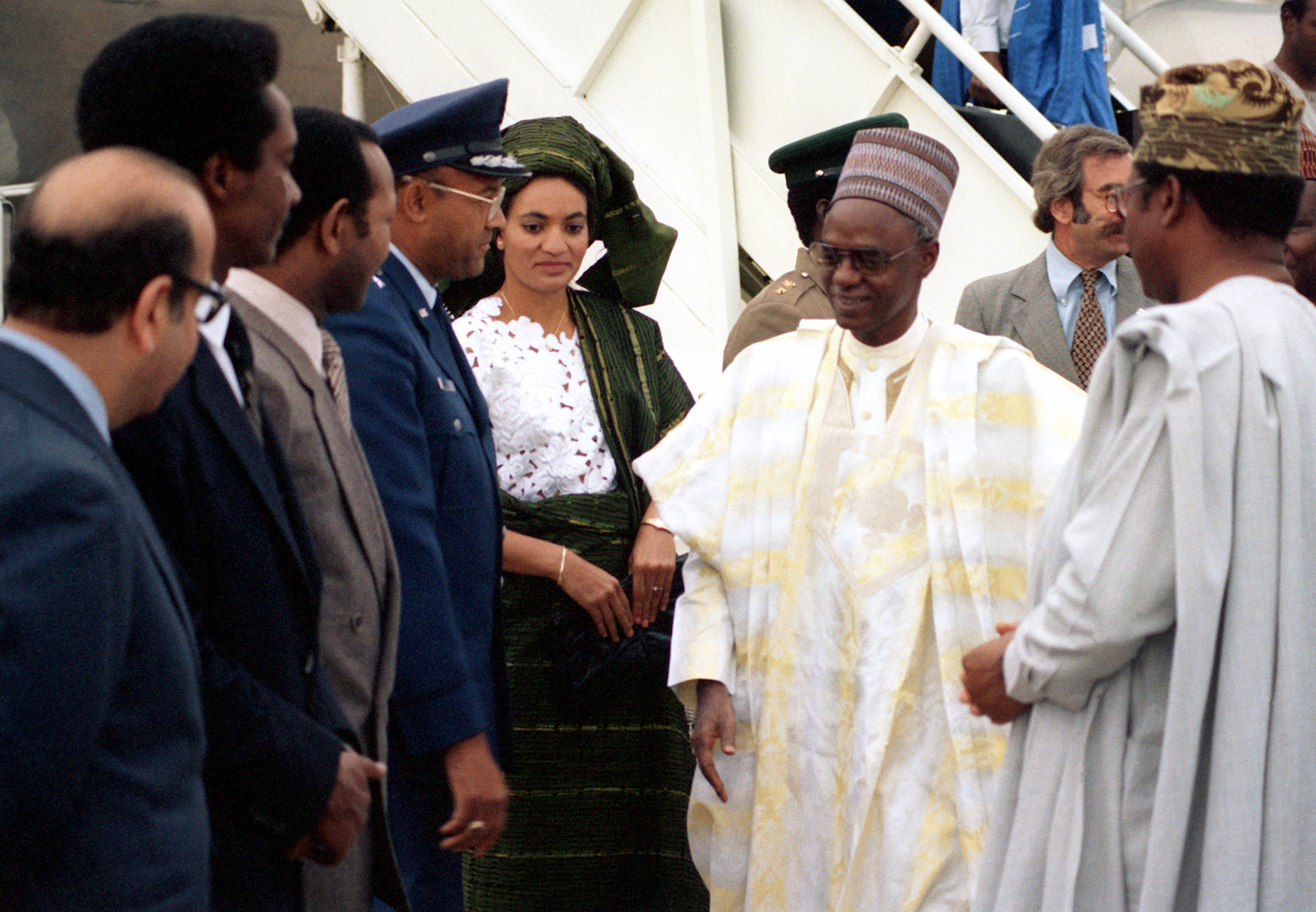
Shagari is greeted by General Archer Durham at Andrews Air Force Base upon his arrival for a visit.

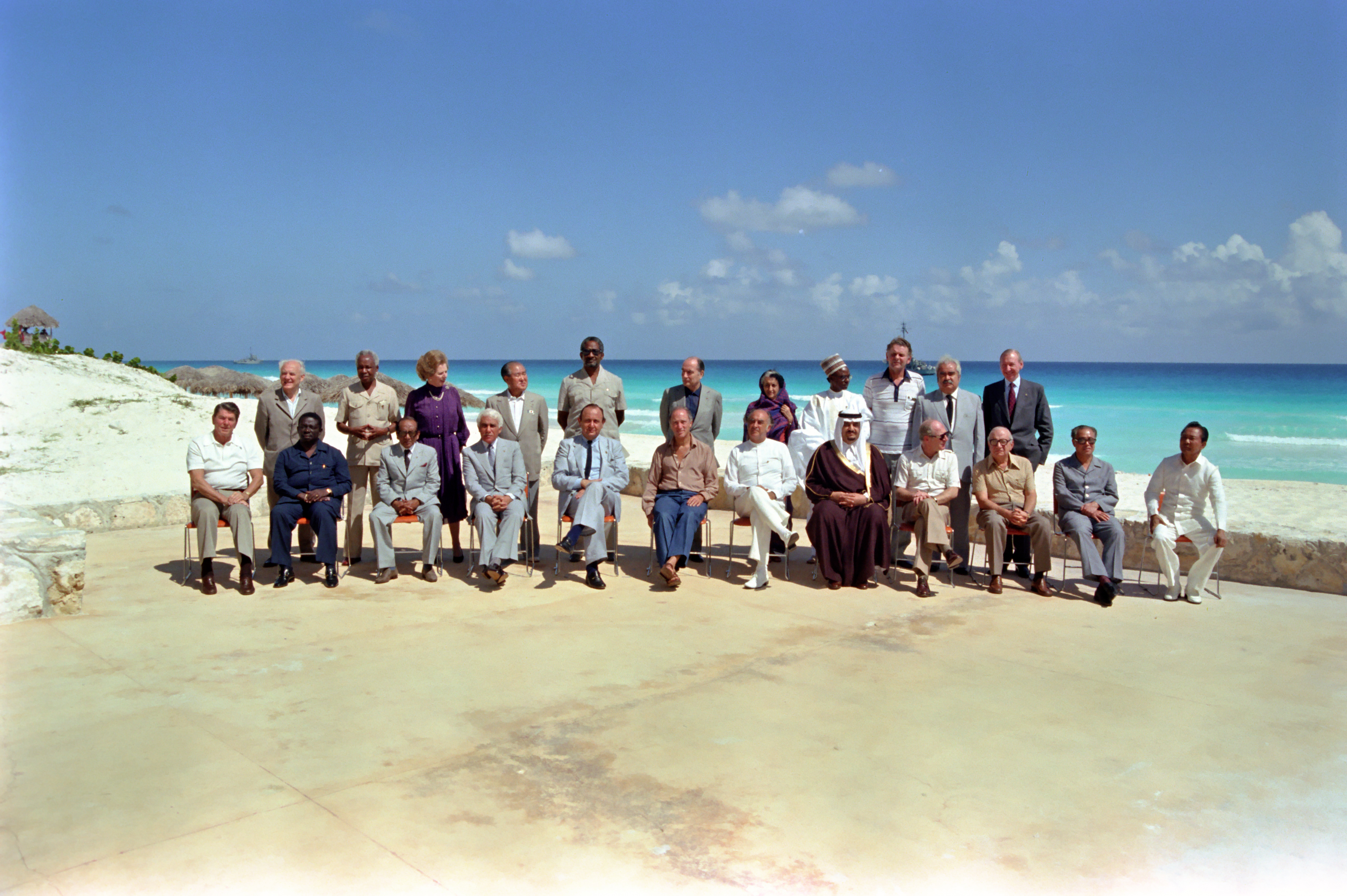
North–South Summit in Cancun, October 1981

In 1980, during Zimbabwe's independence celebration, President Shagari pledged $15 million at the celebration to train Zimbabweans in Zimbabwe and expatriates in Nigeria. Mugabe's government used part of the money to buy newspaper companies owned by South Africans, increasing the government's control over the media. The rest went to training students in Nigerian universities, government workers in the Administrative Staff College of Nigeria in Badagry, and soldiers in the Nigerian Defence Academy in Kaduna. Later that year Mugabe commissioned a report by the BBC on press freedom in Zimbabwe. The BBC issued its report on 26 June, recommending the privatization of the Zimbabwe Broadcasting Corporation and its independence from political interests.

Shagari also made attempts to create ties between Nigeria and African Americans during his visits to the United States. At Harlem where he first visited and hosted a dinner for black leaders, he called for the need for economic ties with African Americans. However, after the 1980 U.S. General Election which brought in President Ronald Reagan, Nigeria/US relationship got to a low especially during the 1980 Summer Olympics boycott which Nigeria refused to be part of. President Shagari insisted on maintaining Nigeria's non-alignment policy and took part in the Russian Olympics despite lobby by the Carter Administration which sent the famous boxer Mohammed Ali to Nigeria. Shagari refused to see Mohammed Ali during his lobby tour.

Nigeria had border disputes with Chad and Cameroun which nearly led to war situation but which Shagari cautiously avoided. Shagari's government was a great supporter of ECOWAS and allotted a plot for the building of its headquarters in Abuja. But despite Shagari's government making peace with its neighbors, it exiled undocumented immigrants who were mostly Ghanaians in 1983. Even though popular with Nigerians, the action was widely criticized by commentators. It is known as Ghana Must Go, the Deportation of West African migrants from Nigeria.

== End of the Second Republic ==
Shagari ran for a second four-year term in 1983 and won the general election before later being overthrown and arrested by General Muhammadu Buhari in a military coup on 31 December 1983.

== Personal life ==
=== Marriages ===
Shehu Shagari married three wives: Amina, Aisha, and Hadiza Shagari. He had several children, including Muhammad Bala Shagari and Aminu Shehu Shagari. On 24 August 2001, Aisha died in a London hospital following a brief illness. She was 49. Hadiza died at the age of 80 from COVID-19 complications in Abuja on 12 August 2021.

=== Death ===
On 28 December 2018 at about 6:30pm, Shehu Shagari died from a brief illness at the National Hospital, Abuja, where he was admitted to and undergoing treatment before his death. It was confirmed by his grandson Bello Bala Shagari and Governor Tambuwal in similar tweets at the time of his death.

== Books ==
- Beckoned To Serve (Autobiography)
- The Challenge of Change (A Collection of Speeches)
- Wakar Nijeriya or Song of Nigeria (Poetry)
- Uthman Dan Fodio: The Theory and Practice of His Leadership
- My Vision for Nigeria

== See also ==
- Cabinet of Shehu Shagari
- List of presidents of Nigeria
- Sokoto

Political offices
Preceded by Olusegun Obasanjo	President of Nigeria; 1 October 1979 – 31 December 1983	Succeeded by Muhammadu Buhari
