= Ghana Must Go (novel) =

2013 novel by Taiye Selasi

- Author: Taiye Selasi
- Language: English
- Publisher: Penguin Group
- Publication date: March 2013
- Publication place: Ghana
- Media type: Print
- ISBN: 978-0143124979

Ghana Must Go is the debut novel of Taiye Selasi. It was published in 2013, and nominated for an NAACP Image Award. The novel follows the Sai family as they come to terms with their father Kweku Sai's death, and as they work through family troubles. Multiple points of view give insight into the characters' emotions and the repercussions of Kweku’s choices. The Wall Street Journal praised it as "irresistible from the first line".

Ghana must go is also a renowned phrase in Ghana and Nigeria. It dates back to history where Ghanaians were deported from Nigeria following a presidential executive order in 1983. Some also believe that it was a retaliation to Ghana after Kofi Abrefa Busia (Prime Minister of Ghana from 1969 to 1972) had first deported a large number of Nigerian migrants from Ghana. This history is mentioned in the book, as well as the Ghana Must Go bag.

== Plot ==
The death of Kweku Sai, a renowned surgeon, in Ghana launches a series of events in his family's life. Although he has left them behind, his wife Fola and their four children—Olu, Kehinde, Taiwo, and Sadie—are left to deal with the repercussions of his passing and reconcile the conflicts he created. In the moment of his death, Kweku takes the audience through the time he did share with his family. From his youngest daughter, Sadie's, birth to the doomed surgery that tanked his career, the first part of the book explores the events that pushed him to leave.

Fola is in Ghana when she learns of Kweku’s death, and asks their eldest son Olu to reunite his scattered siblings. Olu lives in Boston, Sadie is in school at Yale, Taiwo lives in New York City and the last they heard Kehinde was living in London. In coming together for the first time in years, they are forced to deal with the pain and obstacles that their father's abrupt desertion brought to their lives. For twins Kehinde and Taiwo, it is evident that they are no longer as close as they were as children and not even Fola knows why.

Back in Ghana and living under the same roof, the family is forced to confront the events that have divided their family, and begin to reconnect after years of misunderstanding and unspoken feelings. Olu overcomes his fear of commitment, Sadie finds herself, and Fola learns what happened to Taiwo and Kehinde. The novel ends with the family on the path to healing and forgiveness.

== Characters ==
Kweku Sai: He leaves Ghana and becomes a renowned surgeon in the United States. He dreams of returning to Ghana as a successful prodigal son, but his mother's untimely death and career obstacles prevent him from fulfilling this dream. He creates what appears to be a perfect life for his family. When he is fired and blacklisted by the medical community, the shame becomes too much for him to bear, and he abandons his family. He spends the rest of his life away from them.

Folasadé Savage: She gives up law school to be with Kweku, and is happy to be a wife, mother and florist. When Kweku leaves her with their four children, she has to make difficult decisions to save their family. Her arc in the novel sees her coming to terms with a past that was largely ignored throughout her marriage to Kweku.

Olukayodé Sai: Kweku and Fola's son, who takes after his father in career and temperament, is wary of repeating his father's mistakes. His father's departure makes him deeply afraid of commitments, so although he has been in a serious relationship with Ling for years, he refuses to label it or even address his feelings head on. In Ghana with Ling, his siblings, and the looming memory of his father he has to come to terms with the fact that he needs to live his life fully, and without fear of becoming his father.

Kehinde and Taiwo Sai: Fola and Kweku's middle children are twins, and were exceptionally close as children. There is a running theme of their twin telepathy, but that connection is severed as a result of Kweku’s decision to leave. Kehinde is the only one who knows why their father left, and is traumatized by the choices he has had to make to protect Taiwo, so he retreats into his art. Taiwo resents her mother for sending her and Kehinde away after their father’s departure. She is deeply affected by experiences with her mother's family and embarks on a path of self-destruction. Kweku's death is the catalyst to repairing the relationships between Taiwo, Kehinde, and their mother.

Folasadé (Sadie) Sai: Accidentally named after her mother, and affectionately referred to as "the baby". Although her birth was a significant moment in Kweku's life, she feels the least connected to him because he left when she was a baby. She attempts to find a place for herself in relation to her siblings; the beautiful Taiwo, famous artist Kehinde, and perfect Olu. It is not until she returns to her father's village that she is able to feel as if she belongs in her family.

== Themes ==
Family: The novel encompasses family at the center of the plot. Although the members of the Sai family move on and continue their lives without communicating with each other, they have an unspoken connection that keeps them tied together. At times the connections are so strong, familial ties are not enough to explain it. Fola’s connection to her children and the twins connection to each other suggest something mystical to their connection. While time and distance separates the family over the years since Kweku’s departure, his death transcends their estrangement and brings the family back together.

Migration: The impact of movement and migration is set by Kweku and Fola. War and expulsion are the driving factors that bring Fola and Kweku to the United States where they put down roots and start their family. Part of their identity is their habitual movement throughout the world that becomes a pattern in their lives. When situations become too much for them to handle, they flee. Fola and Kweku both move back home to Ghana after or in avoidance of serious confrontation.

Redemption: The family does a lot to hurt each other, like all families do. While some of the things they do and say to each other seem irredeemable, in the end they find the strength to overcome their pain and forgive each other. Kweku’s death allows the family to heal the wounds they inflicted on each other as they come together and confront their old scars.

== Reception ==
=== Reviews ===
Described in The Wall Street Journal's round-up of the best fiction of 2013 as "irresistible from the first line", Ghana Must Go was favourably reviewed in a diverse range of publications, including The New York Times, The Economist, Entertainment Weekly, and Elle. Publishers Weekly in a starred review commented that the author's "gorgeous debut is a thoughtful look at how the sacrifices we make for our family can be its very undoing.... Reminiscent of Jhumpa Lahiri but with even greater warmth and vibrancy, Selasi’s novel, driven by her eloquent prose, tells the powerful story of a family discovering that what once held them together could make them whole again." The review in The Independent by Margaret Busby refers to it as a "stunning opening act", while Diana Evans writes in The Guardian:

Before you get to page one of this book there is a noisy overture. The author has been mentored by Toni Morrison and endorsed by Salman Rushdie. She is Yale- and Oxford-educated, half-Nigerian and half-Ghanaian, born in London, raised in Boston, living in Rome. Her 2005 essay "What is an Afropolitan?" gave a face to a class of sophisticated, cosmopolitan young Africans who defy downtrodden stereotypes.... Ghana Must Go – named after the Nigerian phrase directed at incoming Ghanaian refugees during political unrest in the 80s – is one of the most hyped debuts of recent times. It stands up to the hype. Taiye Selasi writes with glittering poetic command, a sense of daring, and a deep emotional investment in the lives and transformations of her characters.... And here is a novel with a deep understanding of how our childhood experience of family defines to our own detriment our capacity for love in adulthood.

=== Afropolitanism ===
The term "Afropolitanism" was coined in Selasi's 2005 essay "Bye-Bye Babar" and has since received heavy criticism and acclamation. Afropolitan identity is rooted in the idea of cosmopolitanism with African roots. It is meant to describe a new generation of African emigrants with global citizenship. The term is also relevant for those living within the continent of Africa as well as there are several cities with the same artistic and cosmopolitan ambiance as other major cities around the world. One of the key elements of Afropolitanism is the World Wide Web. Part of why Selasi’s term has become so widespread is because the internet has facilitated a form for cultural mobility. Mobility is another key element in this concept; mobility of both people and ideas. Afropolitanism is a concept in response to Afro-pessimism. Selasi notes that the term is used to complicate the idea of Africa as something other than just its problems; it is "the effort to understand what is ailing in Africa alongside the desire to honor what is wonderful, unique".

=== Criticisms of Afropolitanism ===
The term has also received criticism for its elitism, class bias, and commodification. The Afropolitan lifestyle of travel and pop culture and consumerism is not necessarily representative of Africans or African immigrants throughout the world. Critics compare the elitism of Afropolitanism with that of the women in the feminist movement who often failed to acknowledge their privilege as middle class white women speaking for all women. In one effect, Afropolitan contests the notion of Africa as the a priori, the already-known, that has dominated African literature in Western markets. While Afropolitanism attempts to combat the single story by providing a positive alternative through the narratives of the well-travelled few, it may still fall into the trap of becoming the dominant story. In this way, it only further overlooks the stories and complexities of those who are not as privileged as the Afropolitans of the world. The Afropolitan experience may be misrepresentative of the authentic African experience, as fictional literature simplifies the complexities of a globalized world. It is difficult to identify African identity in this literature because "different protagonists come from different countries and do not necessarily share common cultural or historical backgrounds". When this ideology becomes the dominant concept, it may conflict with the people who do not categorize under the "scattered tribe of pharmacists, physicists, physicians" that typically characterize being Afropolitan.

=== Afropolitanism in Ghana Must Go ===
The complexity of Afropolitanism is portrayed through Selasi’s characterization in Ghana Must Go, as each character explores his or her own identity through contemporary Afro-diasporic politics. The novel also carries the essential Afropolitanism component of mobility as a major theme. The title of the book is a reference to the expulsion of Ghanaian refugees from Nigeria. Migrant displacement within Africa is a form and a source of the Sai family’s mobility. Kweku and Fola’s move to the United States, the upbringing of their children in a country and culture different of their own, their rise in social class, the children’s ivy league educations and artistic talents, and finally, the return to the family’s origins in Ghana are all examples of the fundamental elements of Afropolitanism. Mobility is depicted through multiple aspects: class mobility is represented in the success that "characterizes the Sai’s lives in the US" as Kweku brilliantly excel in his surgical practice. Cultural mobility is also exemplified through the move to and from Africa and the US, the family Nigerian-Ghanaian-Scottish heritage, and Kehinde's movement from the US to Ghana to the US to London. The novel typifies the notions of Afropolitanism in its mobilities and connection to "African communities, nations and traditions" as well as its viability "across cultures, languages and states".

=== Other Afropolitan-related scholarly works ===
- Kwame Anthony Appiah's essay "Ethics in a World of Strangers" (2006) describes cosmopolitanism through its morality in a globalized context, and is roughly contemporary with Selasi's "Bye-Bye Babar".
- Negotiating Afropolitan is a compilation of essays by various scholars in African studies analyzing borders and spaces in African literature.
