= Taiye Selasi =

American writer and photographer (born 1979)

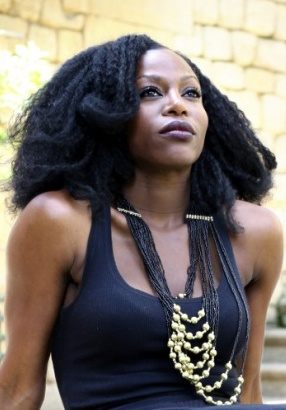
- Selasi in 2014
- Born: Taiye Tuakli; London, United Kingdom
- Education: Yale University (BA); Nuffield College, Oxford (Master of Philosophy)
- Occupation: Novelist
- Writing career
- Period: 2005–present
- Notable work: Ghana Must Go (2013)
- Movements: Realism, Drama
- Website: Taiye Selasi on X

Taiye Selasi is a British-American author and filmmaker best known for her bestselling novel and viral TED Talk.

== Early life and education ==
Taiye Selasi was born in London, England, and raised in Brookline, Massachusetts, the daughter of Dr. Ladé Wosornu, the Ghanaian surgeon and poet, and Dr. Juliette Tuakli, the Nigerian pediatrician and public health expert. Selasi graduated summa cum laude and Phi Beta Kappa with a BA in American Studies from Yale University, and with an MPhil in International Relations from University of Oxford.

== Career ==
=== Author ===
As an author, Selasi is best known for Firstborn Immigrant Daughter, published in The New Yorker's Fiction Issue in 2026, and Ghana Must Go, published by Penguin in 2013.

In 2005, while completing her graduate studies at Oxford, Selasi met her mentor, Nobel Laureate Toni Morrison. In 2006 Morrison gave Selasi a one-year deadline. To meet it, she wrote "The Sex Lives of African Girls," published by Granta in 2011 and selected for The Best American Short Stories in 2012. The next year Selasi was named to Granta's once-in-a-decade list of Best Young British Novelists. In 2014 she was chosen for Africa39, as one of "39 exceptional African writers under 40."

In 2013 Ann Godoff, founder and editor-in-chief of Penguin Press, published Selasi's debut, the New York Times bestselling novel Ghana Must Go. Selected as one of the 10 Best Books of 2013 by both The Wall Street Journal and The Economist, the novel has been published in over 15 countries.

=== Public speaker ===
As an essayist and public speaker, Selasi is best known for coining two terms: Afropolitan and multilocal.

In 2005 The LIP Magazine published Selasi's now-seminal essay "Bye-Bye, Babar (Or: What is an Afropolitan?)". The first person ever to publish on the subject, Selasi sparked a global discourse on Afropolitan identity, paving the way for scholars such as Simon Gikandi and Achille Mbembe to develop the term into a widely known ideology.

In 2015, in her viral TED Talk, Selasi coined 'multi-local' to describe a second contemporary identity. A local of New York, Lisbon, and Accra, Selasi argues that human beings ‘come from’ experiences rather than from countries; that those experiences are shaped by ‘Three Rs’ tied to where one has lived (relationships, rituals, restrictions); and that we err in privileging a fiction (nation) over reality (experience) in conceiving of identity.

=== Producer ===
In 2020, when Netflix greenlit her first series, Selasi founded Cocoa Content, a creative production company backed by French-American media investor Jérôme Levy. In collaboration with producers like Debra Martin Chase, Nicholas Weinstock, and Pauline Fischer, Cocoa Content is developing projects in Italy, Portugal, Ghana, and beyond.

== Personal life ==
Selasi's given name means first twin in her mother's native Yoruba. Selasi's twin, Dr. Yetsa Tuakli, is a celebrated physiatrist. The first African member of the International Paralympic Committee, Tuakli competed in the long jump for Ghana's national team and now runs Sports Equity Lab at Stanford University.

== Works ==
=== Novels ===
- Ghana Must Go (2013)

=== Children's books ===
- Anansi and the Golden Pot (2022)

=== Short stories ===
- "The Sex Lives of African Girls,” GRANTA (2011)
- "Driver,” GRANTA (2013)
- "Aliens of Extraordinary Ability,” TALE OF TWO CITIES (2014)
- "Brunhilda in Love,” SEX AND DEATH (2021)
- “Betwixt and Betwin,” GRANTA (2022)
- "Firstborn Immigrant Daughter,” THE NEW YORKER (2026)
