= Illegal immigration to Nigeria =

As of 2013, illegal immigration in Nigeria is a serious problem and the border has become quite porous. According to the government there are 1,497 illegal migration points to enter the country. However, the NIS have only 84 authorised border control posts to guard the approximately 4047km long land border of Nigeria. They have admitted that they do not have enough personnel in order to effectively monitor their extensive borders (with around 25,000 officers). The government is investing millions to secure the border. People from Niger are the largest group of illegal immigrants.

The total number of illegal immigrants in the country is estimated by the Nigeria Immigration Service (NIS) to be about 300,000, mostly from Chad, Niger, Benin and Cameroon.

== Deportation of illegal immigrants ==
In 2024, 828 illegal migrants were deported out of the country by the Federal Government under the new strategies put in place to curb irregular migration and create a safer environment. The minister also stated that 137 human trafficking victims were rescued by the NIS last year. The Nigeria Immigration Service in Rivers, Ogun and Oyo states carried out joint operations between January and February 2025. This resulted in 155 foreigners being arrested and deported for cyber crimes and illegal entry into the country. In Rivers State during January 90 people were arrested. These were mostly Cameroonians and Chadians. None of them had a valid permit to stay in the country or travel documents. 25 Beninese nationals were also arrested in Ogun State. 40 individuals from Cameroon, Ghana, Benin and Togo were arrested in Oyo State.

In April 2025, sixty-two nationals of Mali were repatriated through the NIS Illela Border Command, Sokoto State. This total comprises fifty-one males and eleven females. They were escorted to the border by NIS immigration officers from the NIS Headquarters in Abuja and were handed over to Malian authorities at Birnin Konni after completing the necessary documents.

It is thought that illegal immigration has contributed to the destabilizing situation in Northern Nigeria.
