= Shagari, Nigeria =

Shagari
- LGA and town
- Interactive map of Shagari
- Location within Nigeria
- Coordinates: 12°38′N 5°0′E
- Country: Nigeria
- State: Sokoto State

Government
  - Districts head: Muhammad Bala Shagari
  - Local Government Chairman: Barr. Maidawa Kajiji

Area
  - Total: 1,332 km^{2} (514 sq mi)

Population (2006)
  - Total: 156,413
  - Density: 117.4/km^{2} (304.1/sq mi)
- Time zone: UTC+1 (WAT)
- 3-digit postal code prefix: 851
- ISO 3166 code: NG.SO.SH

Shagari is a town and Local Government Area on the A1 highway in Sokoto State, Nigeria. The local government area (LGA) shares a border with Zamfara State in the south.

It has an area of 1,332 km^{2} and a population of 156,413 at the 2006 census.

The postal code of the area is 851.

== Climate ==
With temperatures ranging from 18 °C (64 °F) to 39 °C (103 °F), the climate has two distinct seasons: a scorching, oppressive wet season with mostly cloudy skies, and a scorching, partly cloudy dry season.

== Notable people ==
- Shehu Shagari, the first democratically elected president of Nigeria
