= Yar'Adua =

- Gender: Male
- Language: Hausa

Origin
- Origin: Nigeria
- Region of origin: Northern, Nigeria

Yar'Adua is a Nigerian male given name and surname of Hausa origin. Notable people with the name include:

- Umaru Musa Yar'Adua, the president of Nigeria from 2007-2010
- Shehu Musa Yar'Adua
- Musa Yar'Adua
- Abdulaziz Musa Yar'Adua
- Turai Yar'Adua
- Yar'adua Abubakar Sadiq
- Musa Yar'Adua

== See also ==
- Yar'Adua (disambiguation)
