= Yar'Adua (disambiguation) =

Yar'Adua may refer to:

== People ==
- Umaru Musa Yar'Adua, former president of Nigeria
- Yar'Adua, a list of people with the name

== Places ==
- Umaru Musa Yar'adua University
- Umaru Musa Yar'Adua Expressway
