= 1991 Katsina State gubernatorial election =

1991 gubernatorial election in Katsina State, Nigeria

Katsina gubernatorial election
- 14 December 1991
Nominee	Saidu Barda	Umaru Musa Yar'Adua
Party	NRC	SDP
Running mate	Abdullahi Aminchi	Kabir Aliyu Maska
Popular vote	290,613	277,999
Elected Governor
Saidu Barda
NRC

The 1991 Katsina State gubernatorial election occurred on 14 December 1991. NRC candidate Saidu Barda won the election, defeating SDP Umaru Musa Yar'Adua.

== Conduct ==
The gubernatorial election was conducted using an open ballot system. Primaries for the two parties to select their flag bearers were conducted on October 19, 1991.

The election occurred on December 14, 1991. NRC candidate Saidu Barda won the election, defeating SDP Umaru Musa Yar'Adua.
