= Madiki =

Madaki may refer to:

== Places ==
- Madiki (village), a village on the island of Aruba
- Kafin Madaki, headquarters of Ganjuwa Local Government Area of Bauchi State, Nigeria

== People ==
- John Madaki, former military governor of Katsina State, Nigeria
- Joshua Madaki, former was military governor of Bauchi State, and then of Plateau State, Nigeria
- Yohanna Madaki, former military governor of Gongola State and then of Benue State, Nigeria
