= 2003 Katsina State gubernatorial election =

2003 gubernatorial election in Katsina State, Nigeria

- 19 April 2003
Nominee	Umaru Musa Yar'Adua	Nura Khalil
Party	PDP	ANPP
Running mate	Abdullahi Garba Aminchi	Tanimu Hussain Maidoki
Popular vote	892,340	742,582
Governor before election
Umaru Musa Yar'Adua
PDP
Elected Governor
Umaru Musa Yar'Adua
PDP

The 2003 Katsina State gubernatorial election occurred on 19 April 2003. PDP candidate Umaru Musa Yar'Adua won the election, defeating ANPP Nura Khalil and 5 other candidates.

== Results ==
Umaru Musa Yar'Adua from the PDP won the election. 7 candidates contested in the election.

The total number of registered voters in the state was 2,567,245, total votes cast was 1,721,067, valid votes was 1,636,824 and rejected votes was 84,243.

- Umaru Musa Yar'Adua, (PDP)- 892,340
- Nura Khalil, ANPP- 742,582
- Amani Mohammed Bashir B. Y., PRP- 492
- Yakubu Sada Abubakar, NDP- 463
- Shehu Isa Kaita, MDJ- 425
- Aminu Abdulmumini, UNPP- 346
- Mohammed Tajo Usman, NCP- 176
