= 1999 Katsina State gubernatorial election =

1999 gubernatorial election in Katsina State, Nigeria

- 9 January 1999
Nominee	Umaru Musa Yar'Adua	Junaidu Mamuda Yantumaki
Party	PDP	APP
Running mate	Tukur Ahmed Jikamshi	Abdullahi Garba Aminchi
Popular vote	586,681	286,945
Governor before election
Joseph Akaagerger
Military
Elected Governor
Umaru Musa Yar'Adua
PDP

The 1999 Katsina State gubernatorial election occurred on 9 January 1999. People's Democratic Party (PDP) candidate Umaru Musa Yar'Adua won the election, defeating Junaidu Mamuda Yantumaki, the All People's Party (APP) candidate.

== Results ==
APP and Alliance for Democracy (AD) candidates contested in the election. The total number of registered voters in the state was 2,236,067.

- Umaru Musa Yar'Adua, (PDP)- 586,681
- APP- 286,945
- AD- 8,157
