= Abdulaziz Musa Yar'Adua =

Nigerian politician and military officer (born 1964)

Senator Abdulaziz Musa Yar'Adua

Senator for Katsina Central
- Incumbent
- Assumed office 13 June 2023
- Preceded by: Kabir Barkiya

Personal details
- Born: 4 August 1964 (age 62) Katsina, Northern Region (now in Katsina State), Nigeria
- Party: All Progressives Congress (2014–present)
- Other political affiliations: Congress for Progressive Change (2010–2013)
- Relations: Shehu Musa Yar'Adua (brother); Umaru Musa Yar'Adua (brother)
- Parent: Musa Yar'Adua (father)
- Education: Nigerian Military School; Ahmadu Bello University; Rochester Institute of Technology
- Occupation: Politician; military officer

Military service
- Allegiance: Nigeria
- Branch/service: Nigerian Army
- Years of service: 1981–2010
- Rank: Lieutenant Colonel

Abdulaziz Musa Yar'Adua (born 4 August 1964) is a Nigerian politician and retired military officer who is the senator representing Katsina Central senatorial district since 2023. He is a brother of the former Nigerian President Umaru Musa Yar'Adua and former de facto vice president General Shehu Musa Yar'Adua.

A retired Nigerian Army lieutenant colonel, he served in the army from 1981 till his voluntary retirement in 2010, few months after the death of his elder brother.

== Early life and education ==
Abdulaziz Musa Yar'Adua was born on 4 August 1964 in Katsina, to the family of then minister for Lagos Affairs, Musa Yar'Adua. He had his primary education at the Musa Yar'Adua Quranic Model Primary School, Katsina from 1970 to 1976, and his secondary education in the Nigerian Military School, Zaria from 1976 to 1981. He then attended the College of Advanced Studies, Zaria from 1981 to 1984 where he received a bachelor's degree in physics, and then the Ahmadu Bello University, Zaria where he received a bachelor's degree in science and technology in 1987. He then proceeded to the Rochester Institute of Technology, Henrietta, New York in 1991 where he bagged a master's degree in electrical engineering in 1993.

== Military career ==
Yar'Adua started his military career as a soldier after graduating from the Nigerian Military School in 1981, he rose to the rank of Lance Corporal. He was granted Short Service Combatant Commission to the rank of second lieutenant on 22 September 1990. He later converted to Regular Combatant Commission on 16 March 1998.

Yar'Adua served in the Nigerian Army Signals Corps. He attended several civil and military courses, seminars and workshops, some of which include Signals Young Officers Course, Infantry Young Officers Course, Junior Staff Course Harris Corporation Technical Training on RF HF and VHF Radios, Training on Satellite Communications, Management Training Course, Spectrum Management Training, Peace Keeping, Force Protection and Antiterrorism Training. He also held several military appointments ranging from staff, instruction to command positions. His last appointment was as Assistant Director of Records, Army Headquarters Abuja. He retired from service as a lieutenant colonel on 30 September 2010, after 29 years of military service.

== Political career ==
Yar'Adua ventured into politics in 2010, he joined the Congress for Progressive Change (CPC) a political party formed in 2009 by former Nigerian head of state General Muhammadu Buhari in preparation for the 2011 elections. After a successful merger between his party and other political parties to form the All Progressives Congress (APC) in February 2013, he registered and became a member of the APC in Katsina State in 2014. He contested the party primaries for the Katsina State gubernatorial seat in 2015 but lost to former house speaker Rt. Hon. Aminu Bello Masari. He contested for the House of Representatives and the Katsina Central Senate position at different times, losing all at the party primaries.

On 29 May 2022, Yar'Adua won the APC primary election for the Katsina Central Senatorial District, over former Senator Umaru Ibrahim Kurfi and incumbent Kabir Abdullahi Barkiya. He had previously lost the primary election in 2015 to Kurfi, and in 2019 to Barkiya. He scored 310 votes while Kurfi got 197 votes and Barkiya got 70 votes.

On 27 February 2023, he was elected senator for the Katsina Central Senatorial District, in the 2023 Nigerian Senate election, scoring 153,512 votes to defeat Aminu Sirajo of the Peoples Democratic Party (PDP) who scored 152,140.

== Personal life ==
Yar'Adua is a younger brother of former president of Nigeria, Umaru Musa Yar'Adua who died in office in 2010, and former Chief of Staff, Supreme Headquarters General Shehu Musa Yar'Adua who died while imprisoned by the Abacha government in Abakaliki in 1997. He is married with children.

== Awards and honours ==
=== Military awards ===
Yar'Adua was awarded the Silver Jubilee Medal, Meritorious Service Star, Forces Service Star and the Nigerian Army Sport Personnel Medal

=== Traditional titles ===
Yar'adua holds the chieftaincy title of "Mutawallen Katsina", which was conferred upon him by the Emir of Katsina, Alhaji Abdulmumini Kabir Usman in November 2020. He inherited the title from his elder brother Umaru Musa Yar'Adua who held the title till his death in 2010. The title was previously held by their father Musa Yar'Adua and grandfather Malam Umaru. He also holds the chieftaincy title of "Akijiogo I" of Ezeokwe Kingdom, Ibagwa Nike, Enugu State.

Political offices
Preceded by Kabir Barkiya	Senator for Katsina Central; 2023–present	Incumbent
