= John Madaki =

Nigerian politician and army officer

Colonel John Madaki

Governor of Katsina State
- In office December 1989 – 2 January 1992
- Preceded by: Lawrence Onoja
- Succeeded by: Saidu Barda

Personal details
- Born: Gurara, Northern Region, British Nigeria (now in Niger State, Nigeria)
- Died: 8 January 2018

Military service
- Allegiance: Nigeria
- Branch/service: Nigerian Army
- Rank: Colonel

John Yahaya Madaki (?–2018) was military governor of Katsina State, Nigeria in December 1989, during the military regime of General Ibrahim Babangida. He handed over to the elected civilian governor Saidu Barda in January 1992 at the start of the Nigerian Third Republic.

== Early years ==
Madaki was born in Gawu Babangida in Gurara local government, Niger State. He was nicknamed "jungle expert" after attending a course in Malaya on Advanced Jungle Warfare and Combat Survival. At the time of the 1985 coup in which General Ibrahim Babangida came to power, Major John Madaki was commanding officer of the 123 Guards Battalion at Ikeja, and assisted in the success of the coup.

== Katsina Governor ==
Madaki was promoted to Lt. Colonel and became governor of Katsina State in December 1989. Katsina was the center of the Islamic Movement that had been established in 1985 with the goal of establishing an Islamic state in Nigeria. In May 1990, Madaki warned all religious leaders to stay out of politics, and established a religious board to license and control the activities of all Islamic preachers in the state. Tensions rose, and after rioting many of the Islamist leaders were arrested. After handing over to the civilian governor in January 1992, Madaki returned for two more tours of duty as Commander, Brigade of Guards before retiring as a Colonel.

== Later career ==
After retiring from the army, Madaki became a keen amateur golfer and first captain of the IBB Golf and Country Club. In April 2006, he was named a member of the Professional Golfers Association of Nigeria (PGAN) Tour Sponsorship Committee. Madaki is an influential member of the Catholic Church. In October 2003, he met with church leaders, assuring them of Ibrahim Babangida's support should he be reelected President in 2007. In 2009, he was chairman of the FCT Christian Pilgrims Welfare Board. He is a holder of the Order of St. Gregory (KSG) awarded by the Pope in 2009.

Madaki was appointed Chairman of the Securities and Exchange Commission in May 2001. In August 2007, President Umaru Yar'Adua approved his appointment as Special Advisor on Security to the FCT Minister Aliyu Modibbo Umar. In this role in May 2009, he endorsed a crack-down on traffic violations in the FCT, not exempting VIP convoys.
