= Kabir Barkiya =

Nigerian senator

SENATOR Kabir Abdullahi Barkiya FNSE

Chairman National Agricultural Land Development Authority
- Incumbent
- Assumed office 22 May 2025

Senator for Katsina Central
- In office 11 June 2019 – 11 June 2023
- Preceded by: Umaru Ibrahim Kurfi
- Succeeded by: Abdulazeez Yaradua

Managing Director/CEO Federal Roads Maintenance Agency
- In office 29 July 2009 – 12 September 2011

Personal details
- Born: 26 December 1960 (age 65) Katsina
- Party: All Progressives Congress

Kabir Abdullahi Barkiya (born December 23, 1960) is a civil engineer, public servant, Nigerian politician and philanthropist. Barkiya graduated from the prestigious Ahmadu Bello University, Zaria in 1983. He represented Katsina Central Senatorial District in the 9th Senate of Nigeria and was managing director of Federal Roads Maintenance Agency (FERMA) and currently the Chairman Governing Board of National Agricultural Land Development Authority (NALDA).

== Early life, education and career ==
=== Early life and education ===
Barkiya was born in Barkiya village, Kurfi LGA of Katsina State. He went to Kurfi Primary School before proceeding to Government Secondary Technical School Soba, Zaria and then Ahmadu Bello University, where he obtained B.ENG (Civil).

=== Career ===
After completing the NYSC in the old Gongola State, present day Adamawa/Taraba state, Barkiya joined the Federal Ministry of Works in 1984. He rose to become a Director, Highways Department, in charge of North-East (NE), where he supervised the dualization of Kano-Maiduguri road. Due to his vast experience in road rehabilitation, he was later moved to the South-West (SW) to supervise the reconstruction of Lagos-Ibadan and Lagos-Badagri Highways, along other critical roads in the SW zone.

In 2009, President Umaru Yar'adua appointed Barkiya as the managing director of Federal Roads Maintenance Agency (FERMA). A position he occupied until 2011. During his reign as the CEO, the agency saw tremendous growth, with impact felt across the whole country. Most federal roads were maintained and put into good condition during that period. His tenacious efforts toward improving the road network in Nigeria got him the nickname “Dunlop”. His removal in 2011 caused controversy and tension given his track record and dedication to a better Nigeria.

In 2019, Barkiya contested the APC Senatorial primaries, where he defeated the incumbent, Sen. Umaru Ibrahim Kurfi, Sen. Ibrahim Ida and Sen. Abdulazeez Yaradua. At the 9th Assembly, he was appointed the chairman committee on inter-parliamentary affairs, vice chairman on FERMA, vice chairman on employment, labour and productivity while also serving as member in several committees; security and national intelligence, airforce, works, police affairs, land transport and special duties.

On May 21, 2025, President Bola Ahmed Tinubu appointed Barkiya as the chairman of the governing board of the National Agricultural Land Development Authority (NALDA). A government body responsible for developing agricultural land, fostering productivity, sustainability, and prosperity for present and future generations.

== Personal life ==
Sen. Barkiya is married with 2 wives and children.

== Political career ==
In 2014, Barkiya contested the Peoples Democratic Party (PDP) governorship primaries, where he and other candidates staged a walkout from the venue citing unfairness in the process.

In 2019, He contested the Katsina Central Senatorial District election, defeating his main opponent, Hon Hamisu Gambo from the PDP.

In his bid for reelection back to the 10th senate, Barkiya lost at the 2022 APC primary election to Abdulazeez Yaradua.

== Awards and honors ==
Honorary doctorate degree from Science Littorial University, Benin Republic.

Fellow Nigerian Society of Engineers (FNSE)

Member Council for the Regulation of Engineering in Nigeria (COREN)
