= Musa Yar'Adua =

Nigerian administrator and politician (1912–1993)

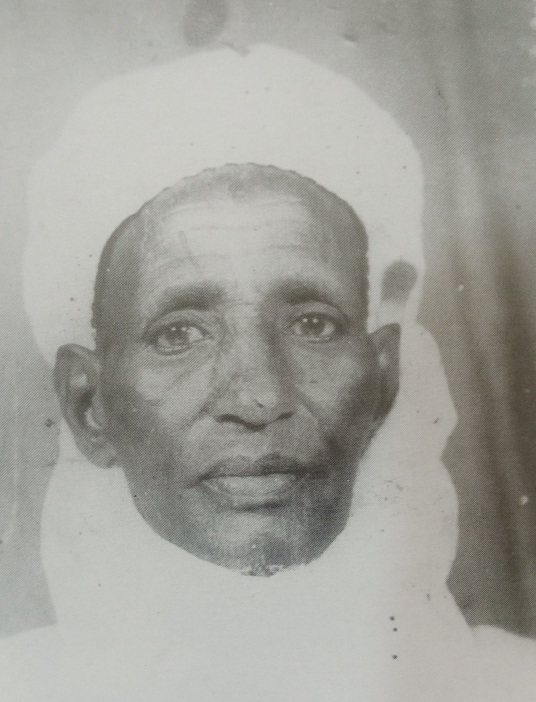

Minister of Lagos Affairs
- In office 1960–1966
- Prime Minister: Tafawa Balewa
- Preceded by: Muhammadu Ribadu
- Succeeded by: position abolished

Minister of Pensions, Establishments and Nigerianisation
- In office 1959–1960
- Prime Minister: Tafawa Balewa
- Preceded by: position established
- Succeeded by: Shehu Shagari

Member of Parliament for Katsina Central
- In office 1959–1966
- Preceded by: Position established
- Succeeded by: Position abolished

Personal details
- Born: 1912 Katsina, Northern Nigeria Protectorate (now in Nigeria)
- Died: 22 June 1993 (aged 80–81)
- Party: National Party of Nigeria (1978–1983); Northern People's Congress (1955–1966)
- Children: Shehu; Umaru; Abdulaziz; and others
- Education: Barewa College

Musa Yar'Adua (1912–1993) was a Nigerian politician and teacher who served as the Minister of Lagos Affairs during Nigeria's First Republic. Yar'Adua was minister when Lagos Island and the capital territory was designated as the city of Lagos in 1963. Before entering politics, he worked as a school teacher for fourteen years and later held administrative positions in the Katsina Native Authority. From 1953 until his death, he was a member of the Katsina Emirate Council, serving first as Tafida and later as Mutawalle. He was the father of Umaru Musa Yar'adua, Nigeria's 13th president, and Shehu Musa Yar'adua, Chief of Staff of Obasanjo's military government.

== Early life and education ==
Musa Yar'Adua was born in 1912 in Katsina, then part of the Northern Nigeria Protectorate. His father, Mallam Umaru, held the title of Mutawalle (royal treasurer) of the Katsina Emirate during the reign of Emir Muhammadu Dikko. His mother, Malama Binta, was Fulani from the Sullubawa clan, and a sister of Emir Dikko.

Yar'Adua began his education at Katsina Elementary School in 1926. From 1928 to 1930, he was educated at Katsina College.

== Career ==
Following his graduation, Yar'Adua worked as a teacher at Katsina Middle School for fourteen years. In 1945, he transferred to the Agriculture Department of the Katsina Native Authority (KNA), where he was appointed Wazirin Gona (agriculture secretary) and was stationed in Daudawa. He served in this position until 1953. That year, after Isa Kaita was elected into the Regional House of Assembly, Yar'Adua succeeded him as Tafida (development secretary) of the KNA.

In 1955, Yar'Adua joined the Northern Peoples Congress. He contested and won the Katsina Central constituency in the 1959 Nigerian general election. Following the election, he was appointed Minister of Pensions, Establishments and Nigerianisation in the cabinet of Prime Minister Abubakar Tafawa Balewa. In 1960, he was reassigned as Minister of Lagos Affairs, a post he held until the collapse of the First Republic in 1966.

== Minister of Lagos Affairs ==
During the years before Nigeria attained independence in 1960 and in the First Republic (1960–1966), the capital city's physical, social and economic environment underwent a period of rapid growth. Yar'Adua's ministry collaborated with the Lagos City Council and executive development board to manage development with the capital. The ministry was involved in granting lease to foreign missions interested in establishing embassies or consuls in Nigeria and worked with a U.N town planning team composed of Otto Koenigsberger, Charles Abrams, and Maurice Shapiro to develop physical and social amenities.

== Later life ==
After the January 1966 coup, Yar'Adua focused on local affairs in Katsina, particularly while serving on the Katsina Emirate Council, continuing as Tafida and later as Mutawalle, a title he received in 1986. During the Nigerian Second Republic (1979–1983), he was a member of the ruling National Party of Nigeria.

Yar'Adua died on 22 June 1993.

== Personal life ==
Yar'Adua was married to Hajiya Dada (1922–2024). They have had several children, including Shehu, Chief of Staff of Olusegun Obasanjo's military government, Umaru, Nigeria's 13th president, and Abdulaziz, who is a member of the Nigerian Senate.
