= Saidu Barda =

Nigerian politician

Sa'idu Barda

Governor of Katsina State
- In office January 1992 – November 1993
- Preceded by: John Jahaya Madaki
- Succeeded by: Emmanuel Acholonu

Personal details
- Party: National Republican Convention (1990s)
- Other political affiliations: United Nigeria People's Party (2000s)

Alhaji Sa'idu Barda is a Nigerian politician who was elected on the National Republican Convention (NRC) platform as Governor of Katsina State, Nigeria, holding office between January 1992 and November 1993 during the Nigerian Third Republic. He remained active in politics in the Nigerian Fourth Republic.

== Katsina State governor ==
In the December 1991 elections for governor of Katsina State, Barda defeated Umaru Yar'Adua, the Social Democratic Party (SDP) candidate. Yar'Adua later went on to be elected president in April 2007. Umaru's elder brother General Shehu Yar'Adua, then a prominent politician with presidential ambitions, had failed to give his full backing to Umaru's bid. Barda was favored by the military president at the time, General Ibrahim Babangida.

Barda completed construction of a flour mill in Katsina, initiated in 1981, but later abandoned. In June 1993, Barda set up a committee on the Rehabilitation of Education "to look into the educational decadence in schools ... and proffer solutions." He also laid the foundation for the Othman Dan Fodio Institute, intended to be the first Islamic university in Nigeria but later abandoned. Barda supported Babangida's annulment of the 12 June 1993 election of MKO Abiola as president, saying "blood will flow on an unprecedented scale" if the annulment were to be reversed. The political struggles that followed the annulment led to the coup in which General Sani Abacha took power in November 1993, when all elected governors were dismissed.

== Later political career ==
Barda was active in politics in the Nigerian Fourth Republic, becoming leader of the United Nigeria People's Party (UNPP). In January 2003, as chairman of the UNPP primary convention, Barda announced that Senator Jim Ifeanyichukwu Nwobodo would be the party's candidate in the April 2003 presidential elections. In May 2003, Barda was a member of the Arewa Consultative Forum, a group of Northern political leaders. In October 2009, Barda was at a meeting where former military ruler Muhammadu Buhari announced the formation of a new political alliance, the National Democratic Movement. In 2010, Barda was deputy chairman of the Arewa Consultative Forum.
