= Umaru Musa Yar'Adua Expressway =

Expressway in Nigeria

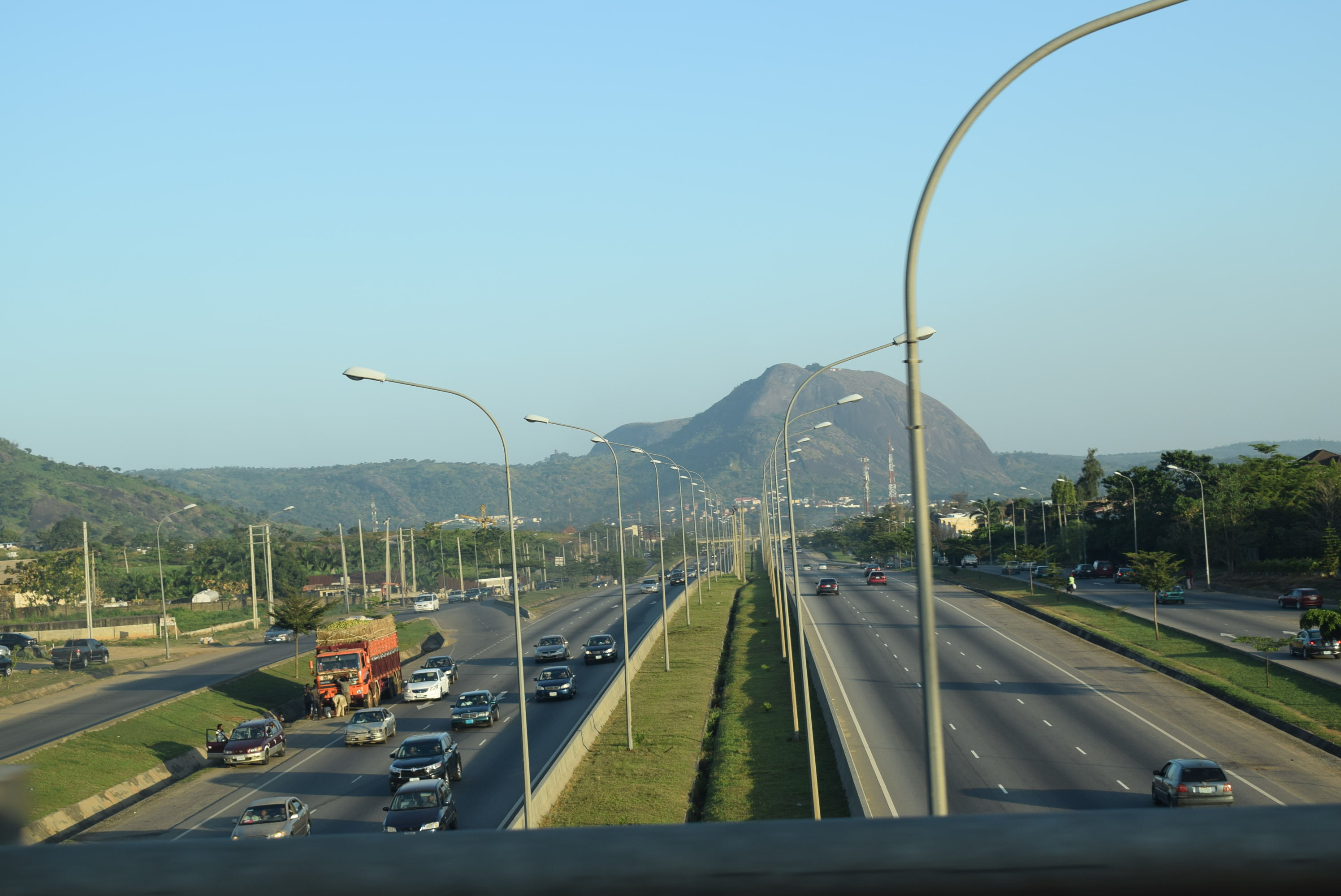

Route information
- Existed: 1975–present
- History: Completed 2014

Location
- Country: Nigeria
- States: Abuja, FCT Abuja

Highway system
- Transport in Nigeria

The Umaru Musa Yar'adua Expressway formerly known as Airport Road is a 10-lane expressway in Abuja, Nigeria, reconstructed to address the perennial traffic on the road by late President Umaru Musa Yar'Adua's administration before his death.

It serves as a major artery into the Abuja city centre from the southern parts of the country. The Airport Expressway connects the Nnamdi Azikiwe International Airport to the Abuja city centre.

== Reconstruction ==
The chaotic traffic situation on the airport road necessitated the redesign and reconstruction of the Airport Road (renamed Umaru Yar'Adua Expressway) – 37.5 kilometres (23.3 mi) in length. The expansion of the existing road to the airport from two to three lanes as well as the construction of a new parallel two-lane expressway in each direction. The project was awarded at the cost of over 1.7 billion dollars to Julius Berger construction company.

The groundbreaking ceremony for the expansion project was carried out by the late President Umaru Musa Yar'Adua in 2009 and completed in 2014. The new 10-lane multiple carriage highways included street lights, drainages, pedestrian bridges and flyovers, lays-by, culverts, telecommunication ducts and interchanges, etc.

On 7 May 2015, the expressway was commissioned by former President Goodluck Jonathan who was the Vice President to the late President Umaru Musa Yar'Adua.
