= Abdullahi Garba Aminchi =

Nigerian politician

- Born: 11 March 1954 (age 72); Funtua LGA, Katsina State
- Education: Kaduna Polytechnic; Bayero University
- Spouse: He has 2 wives
- Children: He has twenty one children

Abdullahi Garba Aminchi (born 11 March 1954) in Funtua LGA, Katsina State) was the deputy governor of the short-lived NRC Nigerian government led by Alhaji Saidu Barda from 1992 to 1993. He was the deputy to the then Governor Umaru Musa Yar'Adua in 2003. He held the position of Ambassador to Saudi Arabia and Oman during the Umaru Musa Yar’adua presidential regime from 2007.

== Career ==
Abdullahi Garba left the engineering field to join politics. He started as a party secretary, then councilor to chairman and later deputy governor to Saidu Barda in 1992 and in 2003 to Umaru Musa Yar'Adua. After governor Umaru Musa Yar'Adua contested for the presidency and won in 2007, Garba was made Nigeria's ambassador to Saudi Arabia and Oman.
