= Shehu Musa Yar'Adua =

Nigerian general and politician (1943–1997)

Major General Shehu Musa Yar'Adua GCFR GCON
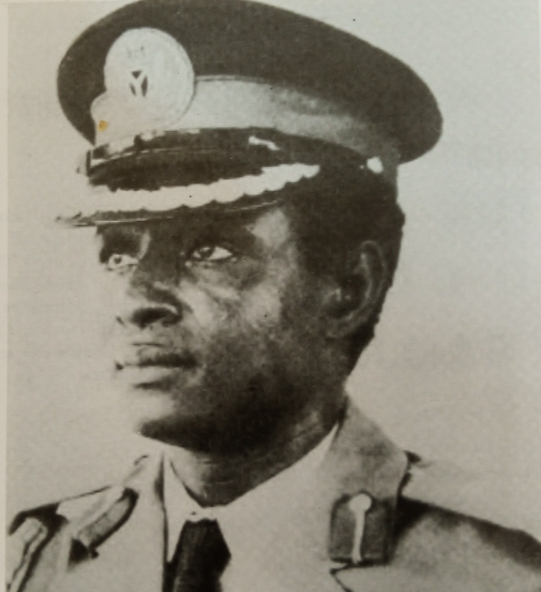

4th Chief of Staff, Supreme Headquarters
- In office 13 February 1976 – 30 September 1979
- Head of State: Olusegun Obasanjo
- Preceded by: Olusegun Obasanjo
- Succeeded by: Alex Ekwueme as 1st elected Vice President of Nigeria

Personal details
- Born: 5 March 1943 Katsina, Northern Region, British Nigeria (now in Katsina State, Nigeria)
- Died: 8 December 1997 (aged 54) Abakaliki, Ebonyi State, Nigeria
- Party: Peoples Front of Nigeria (1988–1989); Social Democratic Party (1989–1993)
- Spouse: Hajia Binta Yar'Adua
- Relations: Umaru Yar'Adua (brother); Abdulaziz Musa Yar'Adua (brother)
- Parent: Musa Yar'Adua (father)
- Education: Nigerian Military Training College; Royal Military Academy Sandhurst
- Occupation: Politician; military officer

Military service
- Allegiance: Nigeria
- Branch/service: Nigerian Army
- Years of service: 1961–1979
- Rank: Major general
- Battles/wars: Nigerian Civil War

Shehu Musa Yar'Adua GCFR GCON (5 March 1943 – 8 December 1997) was a Nigerian general and politician who was the de facto vice president of Nigeria as Chief of Staff, Supreme Headquarters when Nigeria was under military rule from 1976 to 1979. He was a prominent politician during the later transition from military to civilian rule in the late 1980s and into the 1990s.

== Early life ==
Yar'Adua was born in Katsina into a titled family. His father, Musa Yar'Adua, was a teacher who later became the Minister for Lagos Affairs from 1957 to 1966 during Nigeria's First Republic and held the chieftaincy title of Tafidan Katsina before he was appointed to the title of Mutawallin Katsina (keeper of the treasury). Yar'Adua's grandfather, Malam Umaru, was also the Mutawalli, and his younger brother Umaru Yar'Adua, who later became the president of Nigeria from 2007 to 2010, held the title as well. His paternal grandmother, Malama Binta, a Fulani from the Sullubawa clan, was a princess of the Katsina Emirate and a sister of Emir Muhammadu Dikko.

Yar'Adua attended Katsina Middle School and then Katsina Provincial School (now Government College, Katsina) for his secondary education; at the provincial school, where he was classmates with former Nigerian president Muhammadu Buhari. At the urging of his father and his father's friend, defence minister Muhammadu Ribadu, Yar'Adua took the entrance exam of the Nigerian Military Training College. He passed and attended the Nigerian Military Training College course 5 from 1960 until he was commissioned into the Nigerian Army in 1962. Yar'Adua was selected for further training at the Royal Military Academy Sandhurst. He was turbaned as the Tafidan Katsina by the Emir of Katsina Muhammadu Kabir Usman.

== Military career ==
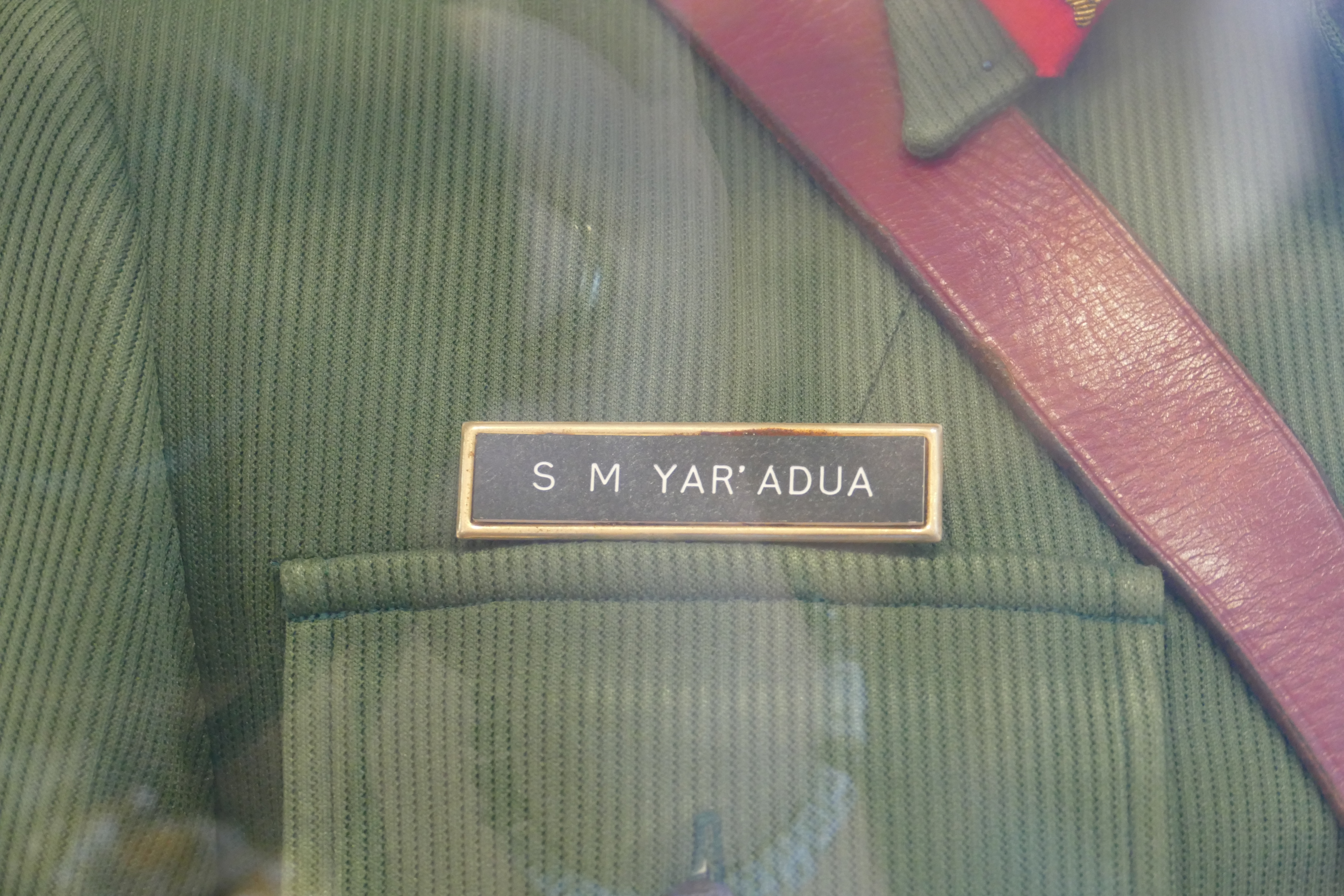
Name tag on the uniform of Shehu Musa Yar'adua

In 1964, after he returned from Sandhurst, Yar'Adua was posted to the first infantry battalion of the Nigerian Army in Enugu under the command of Col. Adekunle Fajuyi as second lieutenant. From 1964 to the end of the Nigerian Civil War, he held various positions including platoon commander in 1964, and from 1965 to 1966 adjutant of the First Infantry Battalion in Enugu. He was a battalion commander in 1967, and in 1968 became a Brigade Commander. During the civil war, Yar'Adua commanded the 6th infantry brigade under the leadership of Murtala Muhammed, commander of the second division. In October 1967, Yar'Adua was given the responsibility for the capture of Onitsha after two unsuccessful attempts by the Nigerian troops.

In 1975, he was an active participant in the military coup d'état that deposed General Yakubu Gowon as Nigeria's Head of State. After the success of the coup, he served as Transport Minister in General Murtala Muhammed's regime. As Transport Minister his major task was to decongest the Lagos port. Prior to the coup, officials of the previous regime had ordered 16 million tonnes of cement to build military barracks around the country. However, the berthing facilities of the port were inadequate. The financial implications became more striking because the Nigerian government was liable to pay demurrage fees by the shippers. The Muhammed regime decided to transfer some of the cargoes to neighboring ports and introduce cement management firms to clear and sell the cement and build the new Tin Can Island Port.

== Chief of Staff, Supreme Headquarters ==
Following the 1976 Nigerian coup d'état attempt, which resulted in the assassination of Murtala Muhammed, Yar'Adua became the Chief of Staff, Supreme Headquarters. The new regime was a triumvirate of power consisting of General Olusegun Obasanjo as Head of State, Shehu Yar'Adua as Chief of Staff SMHQ, and General Theophilus Danjuma as Chief of Army Staff. As head of the SMHQ, Yar'Adua was the de facto second-in-command. Yar'Adua who was from the northern aristocracy was relied on heavily by the triumvirate to consolidate power in the north.

His office was assigned the task of managing operations of Operation Feed the Nation, a self-reliant agricultural policy of the new Obasanjo regime. Operation Feed the Nation, known as OFN, was an initiative to boost local production of agricultural produce, especially staple crops such as rice and wheat, so as to improve self-sufficiency of food crops and reduce growing food deficits. Mechanisms used to promote the objective included the distribution of heavily subsidized fertilizers and seeds to farmers, loans to small scale farmers to enable them to purchase equipment, and an educational outreach programme manned by Corpers to teach peasant farmers how to use modern agricultural equipment.

However, by 1979 the policy had not achieved its primary goal of self-reliance and self-sufficiency. Yar'Adua also guided the Supreme Military Council's initiatives on local government reforms which led to the conduct of local government elections in 1976. The local government reforms excluded traditional rulers from certain governance issues and limited their control over property rights. The reforms also granted recognition to local government as a third tier arm of government.

In 1979, the regime transferred power to the civilian elected government of Shehu Shagari ushering in the Second Nigerian Republic which lasted from 1979 to 1983. The triumvirate later retired from the military.

== Political career ==
General Ibrahim Babangida started his political transition program in 1987 with the establishment of a Political Bureau, and a Constituent Assembly was later inaugurated to deliberate on a proposed draft constitution. Though Yar'Adua was not a member of the assembly and a law had proscribed certain old breed politicians from political activities, his associates represented his political leanings at the forum and was active in the formation of political associations during the transitional period.

Yar'Adua and his group formed the People's Front of Nigeria; Members included Babagana Kingibe, Atiku Abubakar, Bola Tinubu, Magaji Abdullahi, Ango Abdullahi, Ahmadu Rufa'i, Yahaya Kwande, Abdullahi Aliyu Sumaila, Wada Abubakar, Babalola Borishade, Timothy Oguntuase Akinbode, Sabo Bakin Zuwo, Sunday Afolabi, Rabiu Musa Kwankwaso, Tony Anenih, Chuba Okadigbo and Abubakar Koko.

The People's Front later merged with other groups to form the Social Democratic Party (SDP). The People's Front and PSP, became the two dominant factions within SDP. However, Yar'Adua's group was very organized and able to win the majority of the elective posts within SDP. During the Governorship and House of Assembly elections, SDP had a slight numerical edge over the opposition National Republican Convention (NRC).

In January 1992, Yar'Adua spent a short stint in detention, jailed for contravening a law banning certain persons from active politics. However, the law was repealed and Yar'Adua subsequently announced his presidential election. His campaign political structure covered the country; he had a national campaign directorate, and each state had its own campaign coordinator and ward mobilizers. Members of his campaign group included former PDP chairman Anthony Anenih, former Vice President Atiku Abubakar, former minister Dapo Sarumi, Bola Tinubu, Abdullahi Aliyu Sumaila and Sunday Afolabi. Yar'Adua was leading the SDP presidential field before results were annulled. A new election was later conducted on 12 June 1993 which was won by M.K.O. Abiola. After the 12 June elections were annulled, the Yar'Adua faction negotiated an arrangement for the inauguration of an interim government. In November 1993, the interim government of Ernest Shonekan was booted out and Sani Abacha became the new military Head of State, disbanding the political parties.

In 1994, Yar'Adua won a seat representing Katsina to a new National Constitutional Conference. He was an outspoken delegate and in early 1994 organized a political conference at the Nigerian Union of Journalist office in Lagos that earned the attention of the military leadership who detained him for four days.

== Arrest and death ==
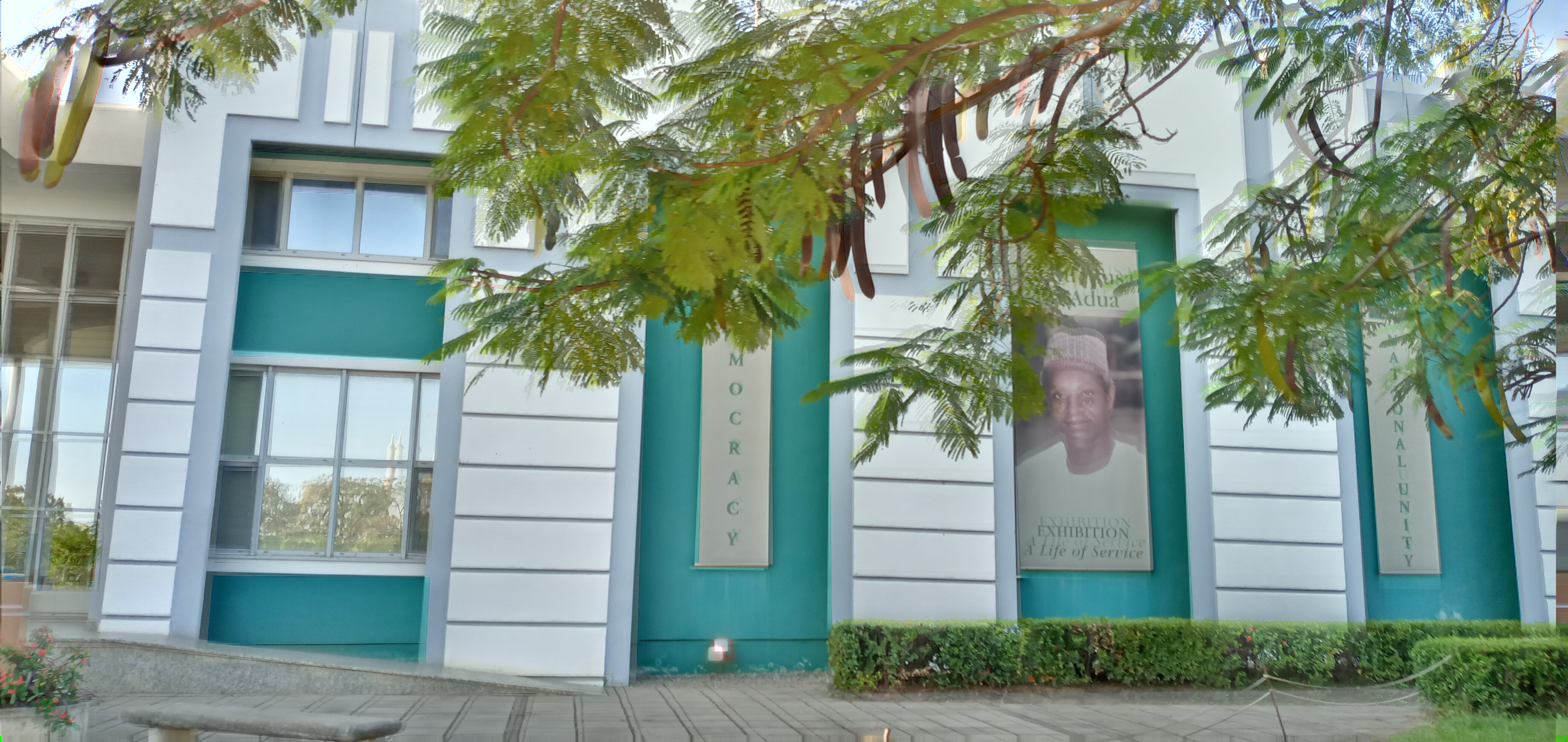
Shehu Musa Yar'Adua Centre in Abuja

In March 1995, General Yar'Adua alongside Olusegun Obasanjo, Lawan Gwadabe and others were arrested on allegations of plotting a coup to overthrow the General Sani Abacha regime. He was sentenced to death by a military tribunal in 1995, after calling on the Nigerian military government of General Sani Abacha and his Provisional Ruling Council to re-establish civilian rule. The sentence was commuted to life in prison but he died in captivity on 8 December 1997.

Following Yar'Adua's death, widespread discontent emerged among human rights organizations and Yar'Adua supporters, who viewed the government's handling of his detention and death with suspicion. The lack of an official government announcement regarding Yar'Adua's death fueled allegations of government complicity or negligence, as Yar'Adua had reportedly fallen into a coma in prison in Abakaliki before being transferred to Enugu, where he ultimately died. On 14 December, thousands of his supporters took to the streets in Katsina, demanding the resignation of Abacha. The death of Yar'Adua also intensified northern grievances against the Abacha regime, as many northern elites and traditional rulers were already disillusioned with the general's concentration of power and exclusionary political tactics. The rising frustration also coincided with broader socio-economic concerns in the region, including growing radicalization among the northern poor and dissatisfaction with Abacha's governance.

== Personal life ==
In 1965, Shehu Yar'adua married Hajia Binta and they have five children, including Murtala Yar'Adua, former Nigerian deputy minister for defence.

=== Wealth ===
After retiring from the military, Yar'Adua established a holding company called Hamada Holdings with several business interests in shipping, banking, publishing allowing him to amass a vast private fortune.

== Legacy ==
Following Abacha's death in 1998 and the subsequent return of democracy, Yar'Adua's political group, the People's Democratic Movement, formed the core of the Peoples Democratic Party. The party won the Presidency, 21 state governorship seats, 59 seats in the Senate, and 206 seats in the House of Representatives in the 1999 general elections.

Yar'Adua's associates continue to play major roles in Nigerian politics. His erstwhile boss Olusegun Obasanjo, his brother Umaru Musa Yar'Adua, his friend Muhammadu Buhari, and his SDP associate Bola Ahmed Tinubu all served as Presidents of Nigeria. His protege Atiku Abubakar became Vice President.

On 12 June 2025, Nigeria's highest honour of merit, the GCFR, was posthumously conferred on Yar'Adua by President Bola Tinubu during Democracy day celebrations.
