= Umaru Musa Yar'Adua =

President of Nigeria from 2007 to 2010

His Excellency Umaru Musa Yar'Adua GCFR
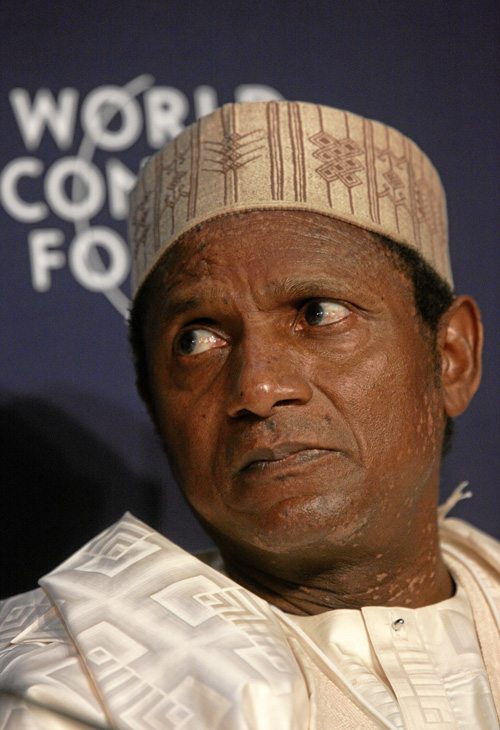
- Yar'Adua in 2008

13th President of Nigeria
- In office 29 May 2007 – 5 May 2010
- Vice President: Goodluck Jonathan
- Preceded by: Olusegun Obasanjo
- Succeeded by: Goodluck Jonathan

Governor of Katsina
- In office 29 May 1999 – 29 May 2007
- Deputy: Tukur Ahmed Jikamshi; Abdullahi Garba Aminchi
- Preceded by: Joseph Akaagerger
- Succeeded by: Ibrahim Shema

Personal details
- Born: 16 August 1951 Katsina, Northern Region, British Nigeria (now in Katsina State, Nigeria)
- Died: 5 May 2010 (aged 58) Aso Villa, Abuja, Nigeria
- Party: Peoples Democratic Party (1998–2010)
- Other political affiliations: People's Redemption Party (1979–1983); Peoples Front of Nigeria (1988–1989); Social Democratic Party (1989–1998)
- Spouses: Turai Yar'Adua (m. 1975) Hauwa Radda (m. 1992–1997)
- Relations: Shehu Musa Yar'Adua (brother); Abdulaziz Musa Yar'Adua (brother)
- Children: 9, including Zainab
- Parents: Musa Yar'Adua (father); Fatima Dada Yar'Adua (mother)
- Education: Barewa College; Ahmadu Bello University
- Occupation: Politician, teacher, businessman

Umaru Musa Yar'Adua GCFR (16 August 1951 – 5 May 2010) was a Nigerian politician who served as the president of Nigeria from 2007 until his death in May 2010. He won the Nigerian presidential election held on 21 April 2007, and was sworn in on 29 May 2007.

He had previously served as the governor of Katsina State from 1999 to 2007; and was a member of the Peoples Democratic Party (PDP). In 2009, Yar'Adua left for Saudi Arabia to receive treatment for pericarditis. He returned to Nigeria on 24 February 2010, but died on 5 May.

== Early life, education and career ==
=== Childhood and education ===
Umaru Musa Yar'Adua was born on 16 August 1951 in Katsina. His mother was Fatima Dada while his father was Musa Yar'Adua, who was a Federal Minister throughout the Nigerian First Republic and held the chieftaincy title of Matawalle (custodian of the royal treasury) of the Katsina Emirate, a title which the younger Yar'Adua inherited. His paternal grandfather, Malam Umaru, had also held the title of Matawallen Katsina, while his paternal grandmother, Malama Binta, was a sister of Emir Muhammadu Dikko of Katsina.

Yar'Adua started his education at Rafukka Primary School in 1958, and moved to Dutsinma Boarding Primary School in 1962. He attended the Government College at Keffi from 1965 until 1969. In 1971 he received a Higher School Certificate from Barewa College. He attended Ahmadu Bello University (ABU) in Zaria from 1972 to 1975, where he obtained a bachelor's degree in Education and Chemistry, and then returned in 1978 to pursue a master's degree in Analytical Chemistry.

=== Teaching, business and Marxism ===
After graduating from ABU, Yar'Adua began his professional career as a teacher at Holy Child College in Lagos from 1975 to 1976, as part of his mandatory National Youth Service Corps service. He then worked as a lecturer at the Katsina College of Arts, Science, and Technology from 1976 to 1979 and then at Katsina Polytechnic from 1979 to 1983, when he began working in the private sector.

During his time at ABU, Yar'Adua was active in the university's radical circles led by Marxist historian Yusufu Bala Usman. In the Second Republic (1979–83), he joined Usman in the leftist People's Redemption Party, while his father was briefly the National Vice Chairman of the National Party of Nigeria.

Yar'Adua worked at Sambo Farms Ltd. in Funtua, Katsina state, as its pioneer General Manager, between 1983 and 1989. He also served as a director of many companies, including Habib Nigeria Bank Ltd, 1995–99; Lodigiani Nigeria Ltd., 1987–99, Hamada Holdings, 1983–99; and Madara Ltd., Vom, Jos, 1987–99. He was Chairman of Nation House Press Ltd., Kaduna, from 1995 to 1999.

He served as a board member of Katsina State Farmers' Supply Company between 1984 and 1985, Member of the Governing Council of Katsina College of Arts, Science and Technology Zaria and Katsina Polytechnic, between 1978 and 1983, board chairman of Katsina State Investment and Property Development Company between 1994 and 1996.

== Entry into politics ==
During the transition programme of General Ibrahim Babangida to the Third Republic, Yar'Adua was one of the foundation members of the Peoples Front of Nigeria, a political association under the leadership of his elder brother, Major-General Shehu Musa Yar'Adua. That association later formed the Social Democratic Party (SDP).

Yar'Adua was a member of the 1988 Constituent Assembly. He was a member of the SDP's National Caucus and the party's State Secretary in Katsina. He contested for the governorship position in the 1991 election, but lost to Saidu Barda, the candidate of the National Republican Convention.

After the six years of General Sani Abacha's regime (1993–1998), in which Yar'Adua's brother was murdered in prison, Nigeria began its transition back to democracy under General Abdulsalami Abubakar. In 1998, Yar'Adua formed the political association K34 (representing the 34 local government areas in the state). The group consisted of intellectuals, businessmen, and politicians from Katsina who supported his bid for the 1999 governorship election in the state. Together with Lawal Kaita's Peoples Democratic Movement, the K34 group joined other associations nationwide to form the People's Democratic Party (PDP).

Yar'Adua was elected Governor of Katsina State after receiving more votes than Junaidu Yantumaki of the All People's Party.

=== Governor of Katsina ===
Yar'Adua's tenure as state governor focused on socioeconomic development, particularly in the education and health sectors. His administration was described as financially prudent, reportedly clearing the huge state debt he had inherited and accumulating a $50 million surplus in the treasury. He was also known for his transparency, publicly declaring his assets soon after taking office, becoming the first Nigerian governor to do so. He was re-elected in 2003.

==== Adoption of shari'a law ====
Under Yar'Adua, Katsina joined 12 other states in Northern Nigeria in adopting sharia law in August 2000. This decision came after significant public pressure from Muslim groups in the state, with Yar'Adua being accused of impeding its implementation. Katsina's government under Yar'Adua took some steps to accommodate the non-Muslim population. Christian students were to be admitted to the Katsina State Islamic University, and the government sponsored Christian pilgrims to Jerusalem, as it did Muslim pilgrims to Mecca. The state's Ministry of Religious Affairs assisted the Muslim-Christian Dialog organised by an NGO, the Muslim-Christian Forum. The first workshop in Katsina to encourage dialogue between Muslims and Christians was held on 19 and 20 February 2003. These efforts were commended by the Christian Association of Nigeria in Katsina.

Katsina had one of the highest numbers of reported sharia trials among the 12 sharia states during Yar'Adua's administration. Two cases in particular attracted international attention. The first was the case of Sani Yakubu Rodi, who was sentenced to death for homicide in November 2001. Rodi was convicted of stabbing to death the wife of the Katsina State Director of Security and their two children during a robbery. The court initially ruled that Rodi should be executed by stabbing with the same knife used in his crime but this was later changed to death by hanging. According to some reports, this was done to avert riots. He was hanged on 3 January 2002 after Governor Yar'Adua confirmed the verdict. It was the only publicly acknowledged execution in Nigeria since the transition to civilian rule in 1999.

The second internationally known case was that of Amina Lawal, who was sentenced to death by stoning for zinā (unlawful sexual act) in March 2002. The man who she said was responsible for her pregnancy was acquitted after swearing his innocence before the court, while Lawal, who had given birth nine days earlier, was held on the basis of her confession. Following significant international attention, Lawal was acquitted on 2 September 2003. The Katsina Sharia Court of Appeal quashed her death sentence, accepting her withdrawal of the confession citing that "it was clear that she was misled into confessing her guilt."

=== 2007 presidential election ===
Between 16 and 17 December 2006, Yar'Adua was chosen as the presidential candidate of the ruling People's Democratic Party for the April 2007 election, receiving 3,024 votes from party delegates; his closest rival, Rochas Okorocha, received 372 votes. Yar'Adua's success in the primary election was attributed to the support of incumbent President Olusegun Obasanjo; At the time of his nomination, he was an obscure figure on the national stage, and has been described as a "puppet" of Obasanjo, who could not have won the nomination under fair circumstances. Shortly after his nomination, Yar'Adua chose Goodluck Jonathan, governor of Bayelsa state, as his vice-presidential candidate. Another view regarding the support he received from President Olusegun Obasanjo is that, he was one of few serving governors with a spotless record, devoid of any suspicions or charges of corruption. He also belonged to the People's Democratic Movement (PDM) – a powerful political block, founded by his late brother, Shehu Musa Yar'Adua, who was Obasanjo's second-in-command during his military rule.

In the presidential election held on 21 April 2007, Yar'Adua won 70% of the votes (24.6 million votes) according to official results released on 23 April. The election was highly controversial. Strongly criticized by observers, as well as the two primary opposition candidates, Muhammadu Buhari of the All Nigeria Peoples Party (ANPP) and Atiku Abubakar of the Action Congress (AC), the result was largely rejected as having been rigged in Yar'Adua's favour.

== Presidency ==
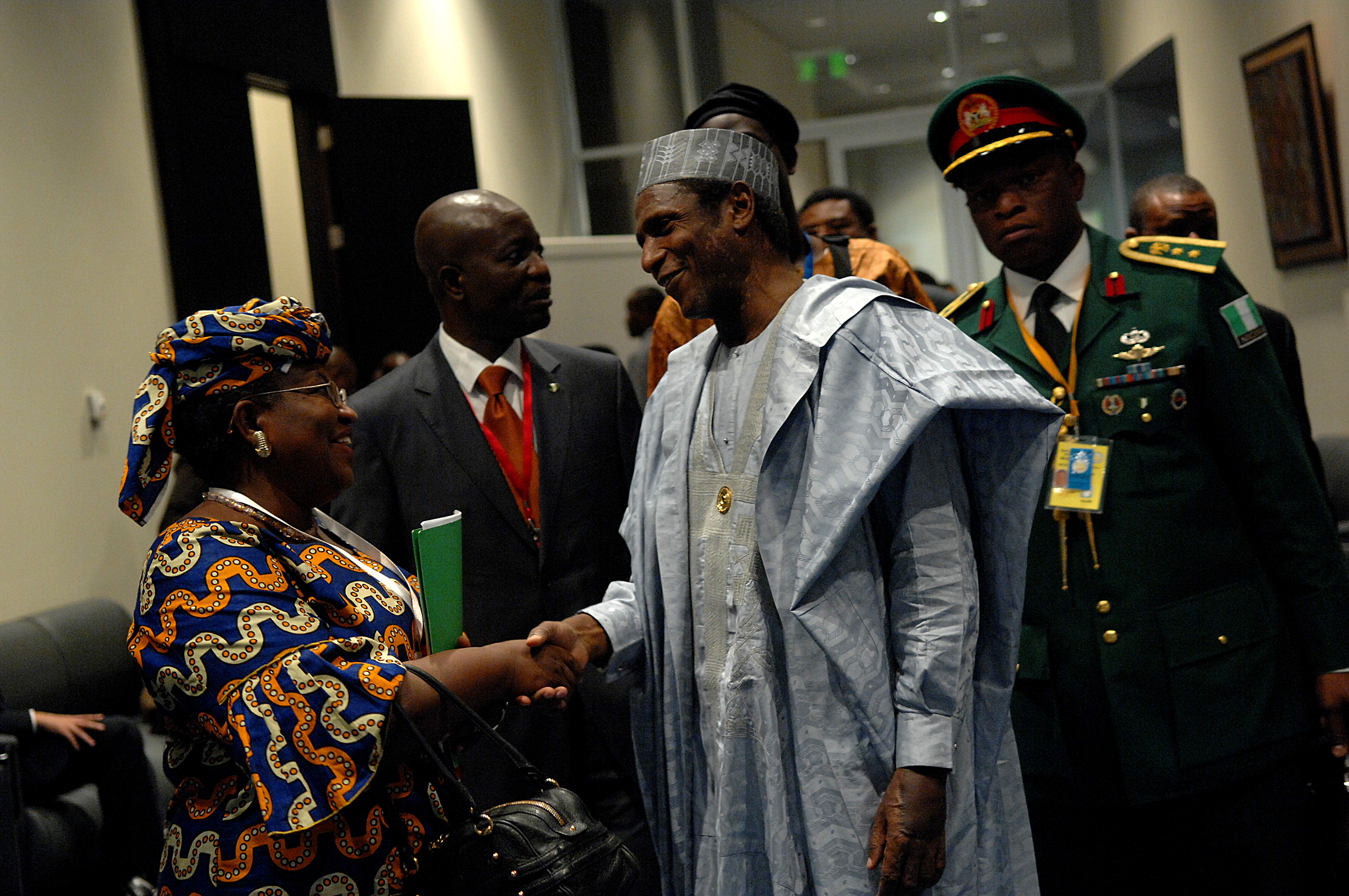
President Yar'Adua with Ngozi Okonjo-Iweala, then managing director of the World Bank, in 2008

After the election, Yar'Adua proposed a government of national unity. In late June 2007, two opposition parties, the ANPP and the Progressive Peoples Alliance (PPA), agreed to join Yar'Adua's government.

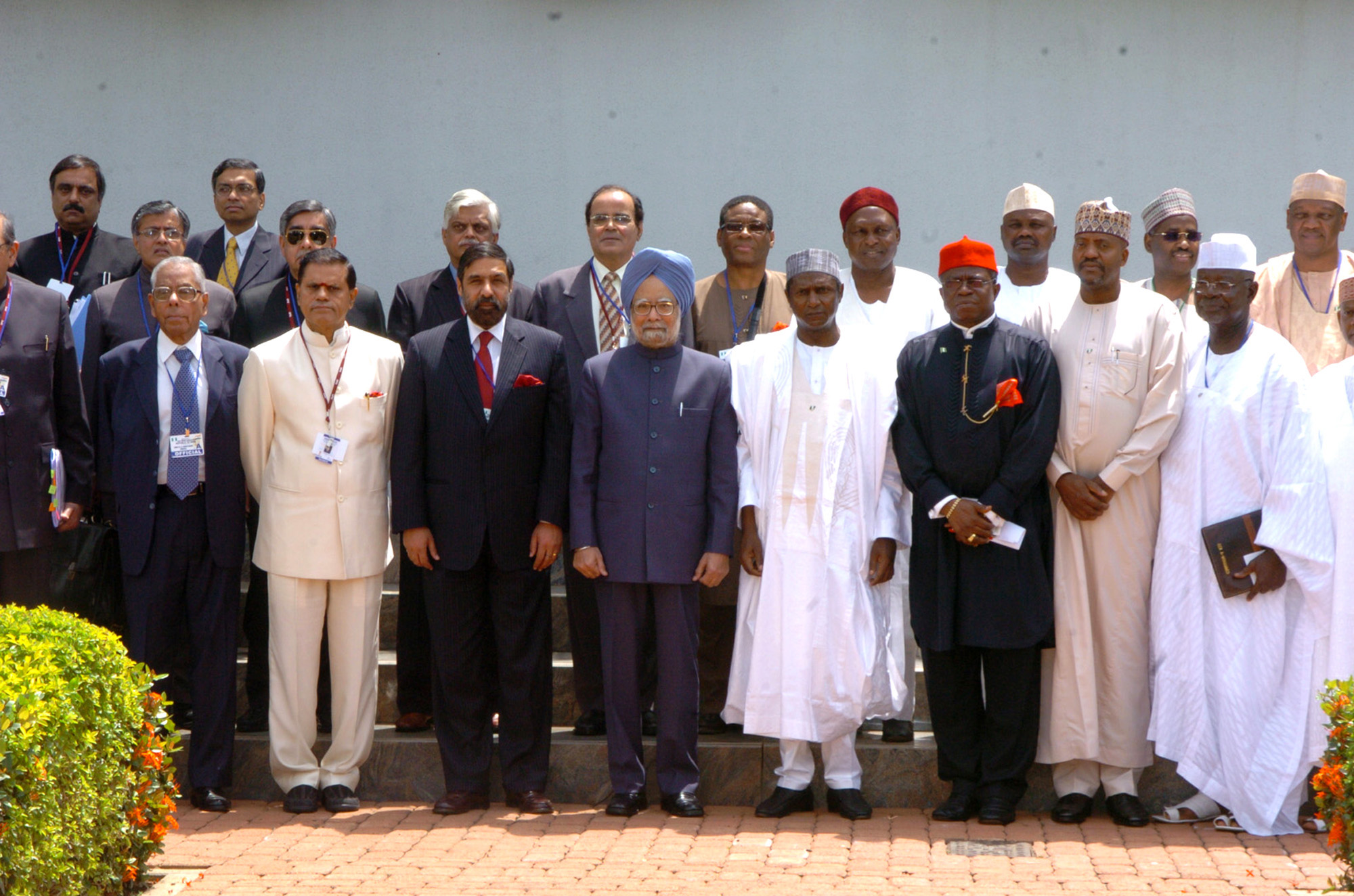
Yar'Adua and Indian prime minister Manmohan Singh in October 2007

=== Cabinet members ===
Yar'Adua's new cabinet was sworn in on 26 July 2007. It included 39 ministers, including two for the ANPP.

=== National agenda ===
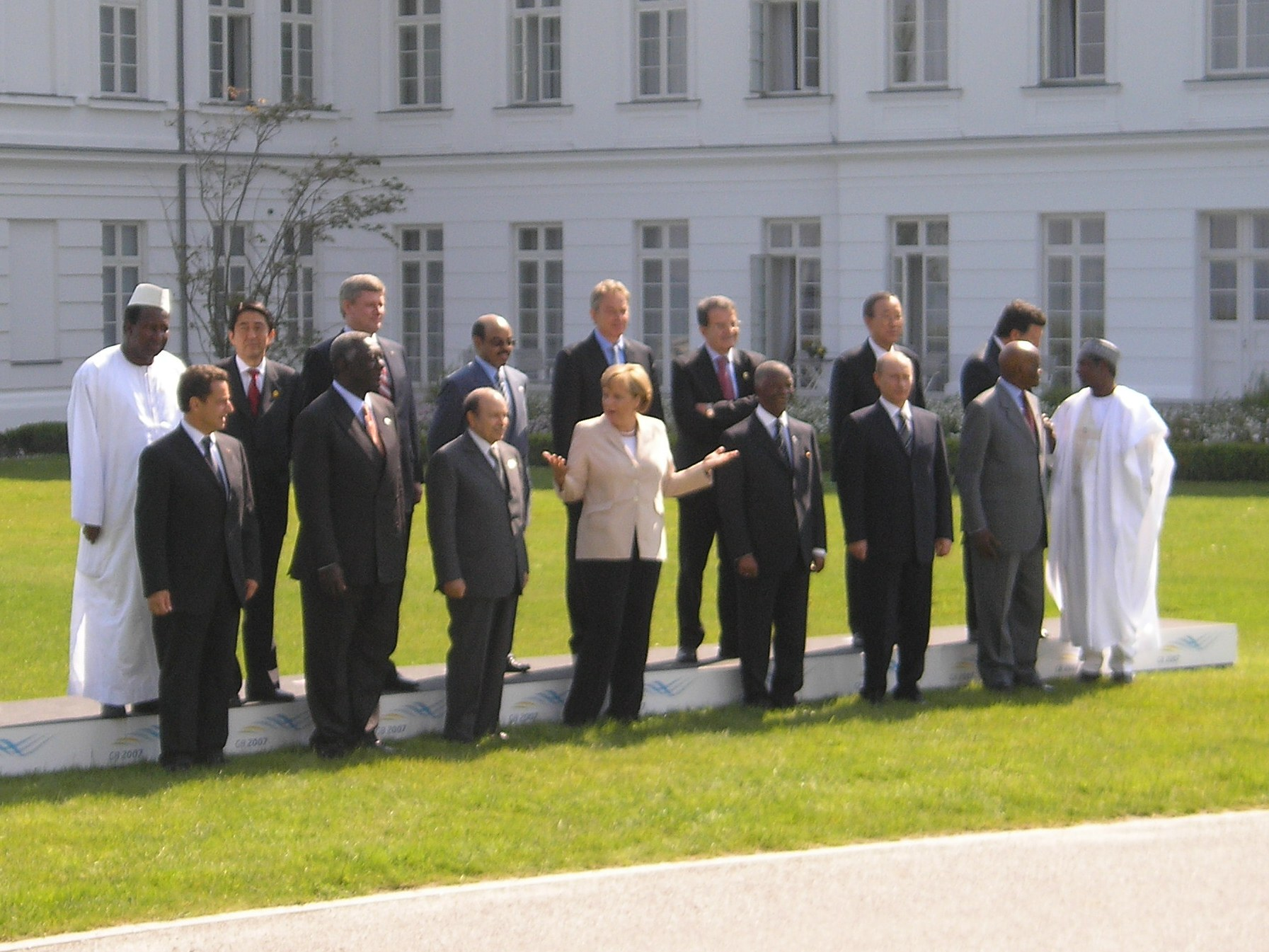
At the 33rd G8 summit in Heiligendamm in 2007 (Yar'Adua at the very right)

In August 2007, the administration unveiled a seven-point agenda to be the focal point of the administration's solution to developmental challenges and stated goal of elevating Nigeria to be among the twenty largest economies in the world by 2020:

- Infrastructure, power and energy
- Food security
- Wealth creation
- Transport
- Land reforms
- Security
- Education

The administration did not realise this agenda prior to his illness and death. The power sector was not adequately funded, infrastructural deficit was not closed down and the troublesome process of reforming land use regulations hampered a reform of the land tenure law.

=== Electoral reforms ===
Yar'Adua established a presidential electoral reform committee to look into the legal factors, social and political institutions and security issues that affects the quality and credibility of elections in the country and also, to make recommendations on improving the credibility of elections. The reform committee was headed by Mohammed Uwais, a former Chief Justice of the Supreme Court of Nigeria. Among the recommendations of the committee was constitutional measures to make the Independent National Electoral Commission (INEC) truly independent, removing some of the activities of INEC with the creation of an electoral commission and a parties registration agency. It also recommended speedy resolution of legal challenges of elections, presumably before the swearing in ceremony of the victor of the seat being challenged.

=== Foreign Policy ===
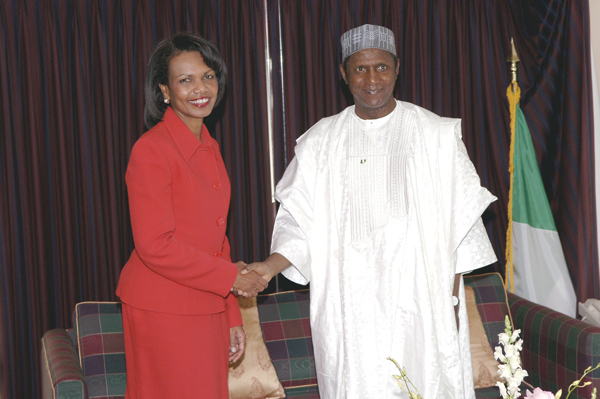
Condoleezza Rice and Yar'Adua in September 2007

During his tenure as president, Yar'Adua had tried to improve foreign relations with other countries to also help with social justice and national security. While talking with President George W. Bush, he had explained that he would help fight corruption within Nigeria and help grow the economy. Though, this turned out not to be so and instead he weakened foreign relations with other countries. For instance, as more Nigerians engaged in trips abroad and consequently increased interactions with citizens of other states, issues of maltreatment of Nigerians abroad equally escalated in equal proportion. Thus, the period between 2007 and 2010 seemed characterised of an era when globalization heavily impacted Nigeria's foreign relations rather negatively. What appears to give credence to this is the fact that many Nigerians, in an attempt to utilize opportunities offered by globalization, became victims of the integration process. During the administration, incidences against Nigerians in the course of the country's foreign relations with other states were at a high level. It was the same across Africa, Europe, and Asia. For instance, in May 2008, South Africans unleashed xenophobic attacks on immigrants and many Nigerians suffered grievous loss and distress in the process.

=== National Security ===
==== Violence in the Niger Delta ====
Under Yar'Adua, Nigeria's oil-rich Niger Delta became increasingly militarized and insecure. Scores of civilians were murdered by armed gangs and security forces in 2007, and the violence further impeded the impoverished region's development. Much of the insecurity that plagued the Delta was directly related to failures of governance at all levels. Despite massive budget increases due to rising oil prices, federal, state, and local governments made no effective effort to address the grinding poverty and environmental degradation that lay at the heart of political discontent in the region. Instead, many regional political figures were directly implicated in sponsoring and arming militia groups that carried out violent abuses. His amnesty initiative for militants later brought peace into the Niger Delta.

==== 2009 Boko Haram Uprising ====
In early 2009, Boko Haram launched a military campaign for Islamic rule in Nigeria. According to initial media reports, the violence began on 26 July 2009 when Boko Haram launched an attack on a police station in Bauchi State. Clashes between the militants and the Nigeria Police Force erupted in Kano, Yobe and Borno. Which led Yar'Adua to order an investigation into the killing of the leader of the radical Islamist sect, which was responsible for violence that left more than 700 people dead. Many are devastated and the war is still going on today.

=== Illness ===
Yar'Adua left Nigeria on 23 November 2009, and was reported to be receiving treatment for pericarditis at a clinic in Saudi Arabia. He was not seen in public again, and his absence created a power vacuum which was usurped by a cabal. On 22 January 2010, the Supreme Court of Nigeria ruled that the Federal Executive Council (FEC) had fourteen days to decide a resolution on whether Yar'Adua was "incapable of discharging the functions of his office". The ruling also stated that the Federal Executive Council should hear testimony of five doctors, one of whom should be Yar'Adua's personal physician.

=== Doctrine of necessity ===
On 9 February 2010, the Senate controversially used the "doctrine of necessity" to transfer Presidential Powers to Vice President Goodluck Jonathan, and declared him Acting President, with all the accompanying powers, until Yar'Adua returned to full health. The power transfer, considered illegal by some, was described as a "coup without the word" by opposition lawyers and lawmakers. However, there were others who felt the power vacuum would lead to instability and a possible military takeover.

== Personal life ==
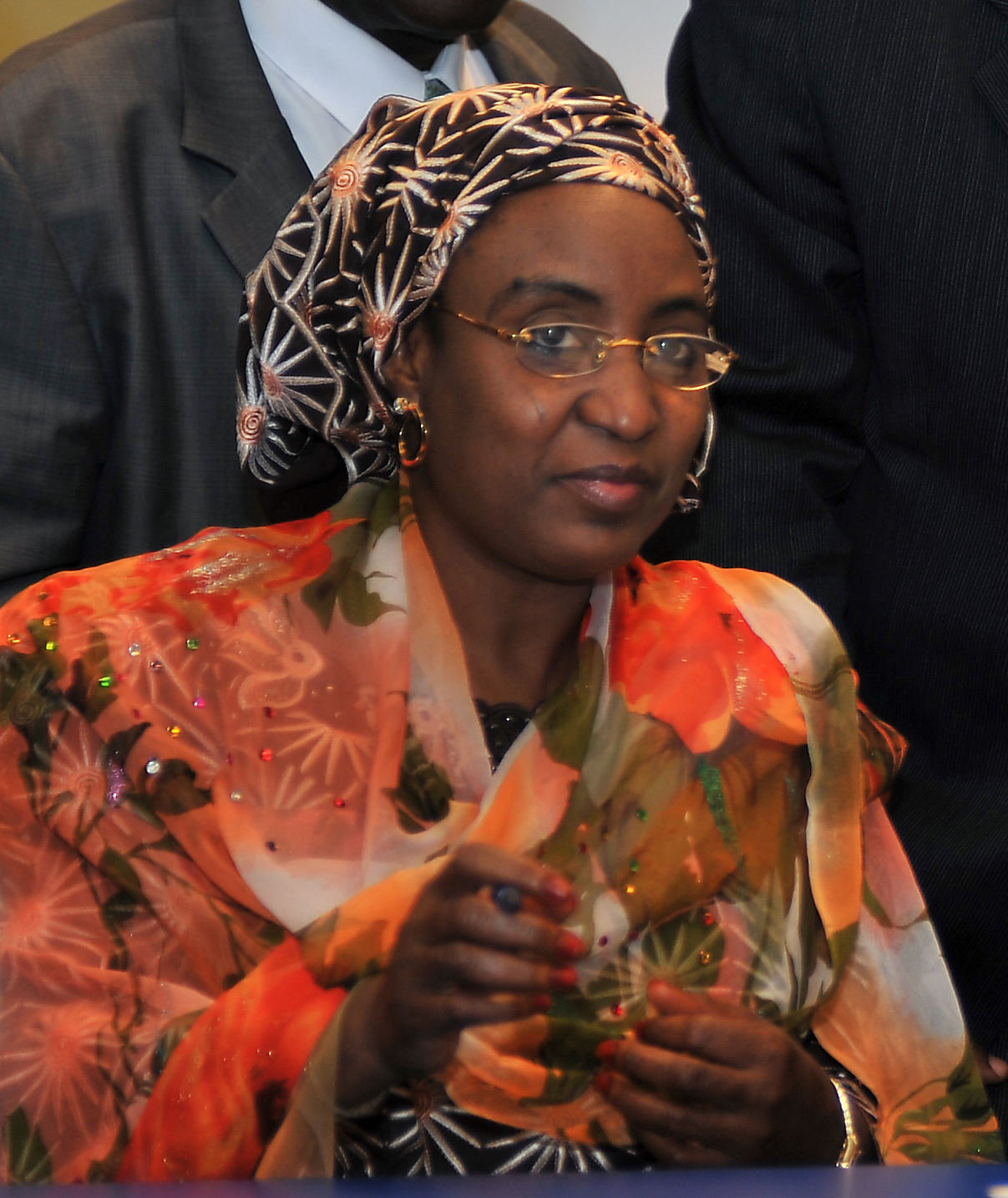
First Lady Turai Yar'Adua representing her husband at the 53rd Session of the International Atomic Energy Agency in 2009

=== Family ===
Umaru Yar'Adua married Turai Yar'Adua in 1975; they had seven children (five daughters and two sons) and several grandchildren. Yar'Adua was also married to Hauwa Umar Radda, a sister to politician Dikko Umar Radda. Their marriage lasted from 1992 to 1997 and had two sons.

Their daughter, Zainab, is married to the former Kebbi state governor, Usman Dakingari. Another daughter, Nafisa, is married to Isa Yuguda, a former governor of Bauchi state. Her sister Maryam is married to Ibrahim Shema, Yar'Adua's successor as Katsina state governor.

=== Personality and views ===
Yar'Adua was often described as reclusive and "someone who knew their own mind, despite being a quiet man". He was also said to be an "austere, earnest, and retiring man." In an interview, he stated: "I go to the mosque and I pray as an ordinary person would pray, because I don't want to have problems when I leave office. The less you allow power to get to you, the more you are able to adjust when leaving office."

Early in his presidency, Yar'Adua's critics nicknamed him "Baba-go-slow" due to the lack of changes despite promises of radical progress.

During his secondary school days at Government College, Keffi, Yar'Adua was said to have read so many James Bond novels that he was given the nickname "007", which remained with him throughout his life among close friends.

Yar'Adua was a self-described Marxist and was known to criticise his brother's "capitalist" leanings.

=== Health ===
In 2007, Yar'Adua, who suffered from a kidney condition, challenged his critics to a game of squash in an endeavor to end speculations about his health. On 6 March 2007, he was flown to Germany for medical reasons, further fomenting rumors about his health. His spokesperson said this was due to stress and quoted Yar'Adua as saying he was fine and would soon be back to campaigning. Another report, which was rejected by Yar'Adua's spokesperson, claims that Yar'Adua collapsed after suffering a possible heart attack.

=== Wealth ===
On 28 June 2007, Yar'Adua publicly revealed his declaration of assets from May (becoming the first Nigerian president to do so), according to which he had ₦856,452,892 (US$5.8 million) in assets, ₦19 million ($0.1 million) of which belonged to his wife. He also had ₦88,793,269.77 ($0.5 million) in liabilities. This disclosure, which fulfilled a pre-election promise he made, was intended to set an example for other Nigerian politicians and discourage corruption.

== Death and aftermath ==
On 24 February 2010, Yar'Adua returned to Abuja under the cover of darkness. His state of health was unclear, but there was speculation that he was still on a life support machine. Various political and religious figures in Nigeria had visited him during his illness saying he would make a recovery. Yar'Adua died on 5 May at the Aso Rock Presidential Villa. An Islamic burial took place on 6 May in his hometown in Katsina.

The Federal Government of Nigeria declared a seven-day mourning period. Acting President Goodluck Jonathan said "Nigeria has lost the jewel on its crown and even the heavens mourn with our nation tonight. As individuals and as a nation we prayed for the recovery of Mr President. But we take solace in the fact that the Almighty is the giver and taker of all life."

US President Barack Obama offered condolences, stating: "He was committed to creating lasting peace and prosperity within Nigeria's own borders, and continuing that work will be an important part of honoring his legacy."

The Umaru Musa Yar'adua International Airport in Katsina, Katsina State and the Umaru Musa Yar'Adua Expressway in the Nigerian capital of Abuja are both named in his honor.

== See also ==
- Shehu Musa Yar'Adua, elder brother
- Olusegun Obasanjo
- Goodluck Jonathan

Political offices
| Preceded by Joseph Akaagerger | Governor of Katsina; 1999–2007 | Succeeded by Ibrahim Shema |
| Preceded by Olusegun Obasanjo | President of Nigeria; 2007–2010 | Succeeded by Goodluck Jonathan |
Party political offices
| Preceded by Olusegun Obasanjo | People's Democratic Party presidential nominee 2007; Won | Succeeded by Goodluck Jonathan |
Diplomatic posts
| Preceded by Blaise Compaoré | Chairperson of the Economic Community of West African States; 2008–2010 | Succeeded by Goodluck Jonathan |
