= 2019 Nigerian gubernatorial elections =

Nigerian election

- 2 March, 4 April, and 16 November 2019

31 governorships
	Majority party	Minority party	Third party
Party	APC	PDP	APGA
Seats before	22	13	1
Seats after	20	15	1
Seat change	▼2	▲2	Steady
Seats up	18	13	0
Seats won	16	15	0

The 2019 Nigerian gubernatorial elections were held for state governors in 31 out of 36 Nigerian states. All but three were held on 2 March 2019 with the election for Rivers State being postponed until 4 April, while the Kogi State and Bayelsa State elections were both held on 16 November. The last regular gubernatorial elections for all states were in 2015.

All states have a two term limit for Governors which made several incumbent governors ineligible for re-election. Seven APC governors were term-limited while eleven incumbent APC governors were eligible for re-election. Among PDP governors, three were term-limited while ten could seek re-election. Elections were held in 18 of the 22 states with APC governors and all 13 of the states with PDP governors. Incumbent state governors running to be reelected included 11 APC governors and 10 PDP governors.

The PDP picked up four governorships from the APC in Adamawa, Bauchi, Oyo, and Zamfara while the APC picked up two governorships from the PDP in Gombe and Kwara; net change was PDP+2. Court decisions changed results in several states with the APC winners in Bayelsa and Zamfara being disqualified prior to their inaugurations while the PDP's win in Imo State was overturned after the erstwhile winner governed for over seven months.

== Results summary ==
State	Incumbent			Results	
State	Incumbent	Party	First elected	Status	Candidates
Abia	Okezie Ikpeazu	PDP	2015	Incumbent re-elected	✓ Okezie Ikpeazu (PDP) 60.26%; Uchechukwu Sampson Ogah (APC) 22.98%; Alex Otti (APGA) 14.85%
Adamawa	Bindo Jibrilla	APC	2015	Incumbent lost reelection New governor elected PDP gain	✓ Ahmadu Umaru Fintiri (PDP) 43.22%; Bindo Jibrilla (APC) 38.61%; Abdul-Aziz Nyako (ADC) 12.59%
Abia	Udom Gabriel Emmanuel	PDP	2015	Incumbent re-elected	✓ Udom Gabriel Emmanuel (PDP) 74.64%; Nsima Ekere (APC) 24.70%
Bauchi	Mohammed Abdullahi Abubakar	APC	2015	Incumbent lost reelection New governor elected PDP gain	✓ Bala Mohammed (PDP) 46.35%; Mohammed Abdullahi Abubakar (APC) 45.04%
Bayelsa	Henry Seriake Dickson	PDP	2012	Incumbent term limited New governor elected after court decision (Note: David Lyon of the APC was originally elected Governor; however, a February 2020 Supreme Court judgement disqualified Lyon and awarded the win to the PDP's Douye Diri.); PDP hold	~~David Lyon (APC) 70.57%~~; ✓ Douye Diri (PDP) 28.66%
Benue	Samuel Ortom	PDP (Note: Samuel Ortom was elected as a member of the APC but switched to the PDP in 2018.)	2015	Incumbent re-elected	✓ Samuel Ortom (PDP) 52.29%; Emmanuel Jime (APC) 41.54%
Borno	Kashim Shettima	APC	2011	Incumbent term limited New governor elected APC hold	✓ Babagana Umara Zulum (APC) 92.78%; Mohammad Imam (PDP) 5.22%
Cross River	Benedict Ayade	PDP	2015	Incumbent re-elected	✓ Benedict Ayade (PDP) 73.04%; John Owan Enoh (APC) 25.11%
Delta	Ifeanyi Okowa	PDP	2015	Incumbent re-elected	✓ Ifeanyi Okowa (PDP) 80.17%; Great Ogboru (APC) 18.71%
Ebonyi	Dave Umahi	PDP	2015	Incumbent re-elected	✓ Dave Umahi (PDP) 81.54%; Sonni Ogbuoji (APC) 16.95%
Enugu	Ifeanyi Ugwuanyi	PDP	2015	Incumbent re-elected	✓ Ifeanyi Ugwuanyi (PDP) 95.54%; Ayogu Eze (APC) 2.21%
Gombe	Ibrahim Hassan Dankwambo	PDP	2011	Incumbent term limited New governor elected APC gain	✓ Muhammad Inuwa Yahaya (APC) 59.88%; Usman Bayero Nafada (PDP) 36.54%
Imo	Rochas Okorocha	APC	2011	Incumbent term limited New governor elected after court decision (Note: Emeka Ihedioha of the PDP was originally elected Governor; however, a January 2020 Supreme Court judgement awarded the win to the APC's Hope Uzodinma.); APC hold	~~Emeka Ihedioha (PDP) 38.29%~~; ~~Uche Nwosu (AA) 26.66%~~; ~~Ifeanyi Godwin Araraume (APGA) 16.06%~~; ~~✓ Hope Uzodinma (APC) 13.51%~~
Jigawa	Mohammed Badaru Abubakar	APC	2015	Incumbent re-elected	✓ Mohammed Badaru Abubakar (APC) 73.51%; Aminu Ibrahim Ringim (PDP) 26.14%
Kaduna	Nasir Ahmad el-Rufai	APC	2015	Incumbent re-elected	✓ Nasir Ahmad el-Rufai (APC) 55.32%; Isah Ashiru (PDP) 43.08%
Kano	Abdullahi Umar Ganduje	APC	2015	Incumbent re-elected	✓ Abdullahi Umar Ganduje (APC) 50.23%; Abba Kabir Yusuf (PDP) 49.77%
Katsina	Aminu Bello Masari	APC	2015	Incumbent re-elected	✓ Aminu Bello Masari (APC) 70.04%; Garba Yakubu Lado (PDP) 29.03%
Kebbi	Abubakar Atiku Bagudu	APC	2015	Incumbent re-elected	✓ Abubakar Atiku Bagudu (APC) 84.92%; Isa Mohammed Galaudu (PDP) 13.44%
Kogi	Yahaya Bello	APC	2015 (Note: In 2015, APC's candidate Abubakar Audu won the Kogi gubernatorial election but died shortly afterwards. As runner-up in the APC primary, Yahaya Bello was declared Governor-elect.)	Incumbent re-elected	✓ Yahaya Bello (APC) 66.51%; Musa Wada (PDP) 31.06%
Kwara	Abdulfatah Ahmed	PDP	2011	Incumbent term limited New governor elected APC gain	✓ AbdulRahman AbdulRazaq (APC) 73.12%; Razak Atunwa (PDP) 25.31%
Lagos	Akinwunmi Ambode	APC	2015	Incumbent lost renomination New governor elected APC hold	✓ Babajide Sanwo-Olu (APC) 75.65%; Jimi Agbaje (PDP) 21.09%
Nasarawa	Umaru Tanko Al-Makura	APC	2011	Incumbent term limited New governor elected APC hold	✓ Abdullahi Sule (APC) 48.78%; David Ombugadu (PDP) 27.47%; Labaran Maku (APGA) 19.79%
Niger	Abubakar Sani Bello	APC	2015	Incumbent re-elected	✓ Abubakar Sani Bello (APC) 58.43%; Umar Nasko (PDP) 33.09%
Ogun	Ibikunle Amosun	APC	2011	Incumbent term limited New governor elected APC hold	✓ Dapo Abiodun (APC) 35.49%; Adekunle Akinlade (APM) 32.62%; Gboyega Nasir Isiaka (ADC) 16.22%; Buruji Kashamu (PDP) 10.32%
Oyo	Abiola Ajimobi	APC	2011	Incumbent term limited New governor elected PDP gain	✓ Seyi Makinde (PDP) 56.24%; Adebayo Adelabu (APC) 39.04%
Plateau	Simon Lalong	APC	2015	Incumbent re-elected	✓ Simon Lalong (APC) 51.35%; Jeremiah Useni (PDP) 47.14%
Rivers	Ezenwo Nyesom Wike	PDP	2015	Incumbent re-elected	✓ Ezenwo Nyesom Wike (PDP) 83.28%; Biokpomabo Awara (AAC) 16.72%
Sokoto	Aminu Tambuwal	PDP (Note: Aminu Tambuwal was elected as a member of the APC but switched to the PDP in 2018.)	2015	Incumbent re-elected	✓ Aminu Tambuwal (PDP) 49.41%; Isa Ahmad Aliyu (APC) 49.37%
Taraba	Darius Ishaku	PDP	2015	Incumbent re-elected	✓ Darius Ishaku (PDP) 57.21%; Sani Abubakar Danladi (APC) 39.87%
Yobe	Ibrahim Gaidam	APC	2009 (Note: Ibrahim Gaidam took office in 2009 after his predecessor Mamman Bello Ali died. He was subsequently elected to a full term in the 2011 gubernatorial election.)	Incumbent term limited New governor elected APC hold	✓ Mai Mala Buni (APC) 81.26%; Umar Iliya Damagum (PDP) 17.52%
Zamfara	Abdul'aziz Abubakar Yari	APC	2011	Incumbent term limited New governor elected after court decision (Note: Mukhtar Shehu Idris of the APC was originally elected Governor; however, a May 2019 Supreme Court judgement disqualified Idris and awarded the win to the PDP's Bello Matawalle.); PDP gain	~~Mukhtar Shehu Idris (APC) 67.41%~~; ✓ Bello Matawalle (PDP) 23.89%

== Abia State ==
One-term PDP incumbent Okezie Ikpeazu sought re-election and won the PDP nomination while businessman Uchechukwu Sampson Ogah became his main opponent by winning the APC nomination. Ikpeazu won re-election, 60–23.

Candidate	Party	Votes	%
Okezie Victor Ikpeazu	People's Democratic Party (PDP)	261,127	60.26
Uchechukwu Sampson Ogah	All Progressives Congress (APC)	99,574	22.98
Alex Otti	All Progressives Grand Alliance (APGA)	64,366	14.85
Hon. (Mrs) Blessing Nwagba	Social Democratic Party (SDP)	2,191	0.51
Okoronkwo Fortunes Paul	Providence People's Congress (PPC)	1,044	0.24
Chukwudi Nnabugwu	People's Party of Nigeria (PPN)	624	0.14
Okey Okoro Udo	Action Democratic Party (ADP)	522	0.12
Igara Ceekay Kalu	Labour Party (LP)	520	0.12
Madu Anthony Chukwuonye	People for Democratic Change (PDC)	442	0.10
Obinna Kelenna	African Democratic Congress (ADC)	333	0.08
Igwo Nnanna Okpan	All Grassroots Alliance (AGA)	293	0.07
Orji Kingsley	Zenith Labour Party (ZLP)	291	0.07
Ulunwa Utokannandu Morgan	Alliance National Party (ANP)	289	0.07
Ubani Vincent Anthony	African Action Congress (AAC)	254	0.06
Onuoha Uko Igwe	All Grand Alliance Party (AGAP)	247	0.06
Opara Alphonsius Obinna	Advanced Congress of Democrats (ACD)	166	0.04
Francis Onugu Ukwu	United Progressive Party (UPP)	151	0.03
Umeh Charles Okezi	Action Peoples Party (APP)	138	0.03
Udeagha Rose Uzoaru	Mega Party of Nigeria (MPN)	124	0.03
Benson Chibunna Onyekachi	Kowa Party (KP)	102	0.02
Nkoro Joseph Ngozi	Young Progressive Party (YPP)	100	0.02
Ahaiwe Udochukwu Elvis	Restoration Party of Nigeria (RP)	89	0.02
Awa Ezekiel Anya	People's Trust (PT)	53	0.01
Emeka Uwakolam	Accord (A)	43	0.01
Charles Okechukwu Okereke	Justice Must Prevail Party (JMPP)	40	0.01
Gilbert Chikezie Chris	Independent Democrats (ID)	38	0.01
Chijioke Owanta	Alliance of Social Democrats (ASD)	35	0.01
Annyalewachi Nwaozuru	Green Party of Nigeria (GPN)	33	0.01
Michael Imojo Ndu	Alliance for a United Nigeria (AUN)	29	0.01
Paul Chinedu Emmanuel	Fresh Democratic Party (FRESH)	22	0.01
Chinwuba Queen Edith Asikaralinoun	Change Advocacy Party (CAP)	21	0.00
Obasi Heavens Ugochukwu	Democratic Alternative (DA)	14	0.00
Total		433,315	100.00
Valid votes		433,315	97.51
Invalid/blank votes		11,061	2.49
Total votes		444,376	100.00
Registered voters/turnout		1,932,892	22.99
Source: INEC

== Adamawa State ==
One-term APC incumbent Bindo Jibrilla sought re-election and won the APC nomination while former Acting Governor Ahmadu Umaru Fintiri became his main opponent by winning the PDP nomination. Fintiri defeated incumbent Jibrilla, 43–37.

Candidate	Party	Votes	%
Ahmadu Umaru Fintiri	People's Democratic Party	376,552	43.22
Bindo Jibrilla	All Progressives Congress	336,386	38.61
Other candidates		158,369	18.18
Total		871,307	100.00
Valid votes		871,307	96.91
Invalid/blank votes		27,790	3.09
Total votes		899,097	100.00
Registered voters/turnout		1,973,083	45.57
Source: ThisDayLive

== Akwa Ibom State ==
One-term PDP incumbent Udom Gabriel Emmanuel sought re-election and won the PDP nomination while former managing director of the Niger Delta Development Commission Nsima Ekere became his main opponent by winning the APC nomination. Emmanuel won re-election, 75–25.

Candidate	Party	Votes	%
Udom Gabriel Emmanuel	People's Democratic Party	519,712	74.64
Nsima Ekere	All Progressives Congress	171,978	24.70
Other candidates		4,555	0.65
Total		696,245	100.00
Valid votes		696,245	97.78
Invalid/blank votes		15,792	2.22
Total votes		712,037	100.00
Registered voters/turnout		2,119,727	33.59
Source: Leadership

== Bauchi State ==
One-term APC incumbent Mohammed Abdullahi Abubakar sought re-election and won the APC nomination while former FCT Minister Bala Mohammed became his main opponent by winning the PDP nomination. Mohammed defeated incumbent Abubakar, 46–45.

== Bayelsa State ==
Two-term PDP incumbent Henry Seriake Dickson was ineligible for re-election due to term limits. Businessman David Lyon won the APC nomination while Bayelsa Central Senator Douye Diri won the PDP nomination. Initial results showed Lyon defeating Diri, 71–29, but due to a false certificate from APC Deputy Governor nominee Biobarakuma Degi, Lyon was disqualified and Diri was declared winner.

== Benue State ==
One-term incumbent Samuel Ortom switched from the APC to the PDP in 2019 and sought re-election under the PDP banner; Ortom won the PDP nomination while former Representative Emmanuel Jime became his main opponent by winning the APC nomination. Ortom won re-election, 52–42.

Candidate	Party	Votes	%
Samuel Ortom	People's Democratic Party	434,473	52.29
Emmanuel Jime	All Progressives Congress	345,155	41.54
Other candidates		51,326	6.18
Total		830,954	100.00
Valid votes		830,954	98.20
Invalid/blank votes		15,268	1.80
Total votes		846,222	100.00
Registered voters/turnout		2,471,894	34.23
Source: Yafri

== Borno State ==
Two-term APC incumbent Kashim Shettima was ineligible for re-election due to term limits. Former Commissioner of Reconstruction, Rehabilitation and Resettlement Babagana Umara Zulum won the APC nomination while former Borno ANPP Chairman Mohammad Imam won the PDP nomination. Zulum defeated Imam, 93–5.

Candidate	Party	Votes	%
Babagana Umara Zulum	All Progressives Congress	1,175,440	92.78
Mohammad Imam	People's Democratic Party	66,115	5.22
Other candidates		25,412	2.01
Total		1,266,967	100.00
Valid votes		1,266,967	98.29
Invalid/blank votes		22,060	1.71
Total votes		1,289,027	100.00
Registered voters/turnout		2,316,218	55.65
Source: Premium Times

== Cross River State ==
One-term PDP incumbent Ben Ayade sought re-election and won the PDP nomination while Cross River Central Senator John Owan Enoh became his main opponent by winning the APC nomination. Ayade won re-election, 73–25.

Candidate	Party	Votes	%
Ayade Benedict Bengiousuye	People's Democratic Party (PDP)	381,484	73.04
John Owan Enoh	All Progressives Congress (APC)	131,161	25.11
Eyo Ekpo O.	Social Democratic Party (SDP)	4,818	0.92
Ntan Ebaye Ekpa	National Conscience Party (NCP)	1,092	0.21
Edward Eniad Ugbe	Action Democratic Party (ADP)	648	0.12
Ushie Tony Ashibesibe	African Democratic Congress (ADC)	490	0.09
Charles Inah Okoi	Alliance of Social Democrats (ASD)	360	0.07
Undie Emmanuel Ugbong	Young Democratic Party (YDP)	345	0.07
Ali Patrick	Progressive Peoples Alliance (PPA)	305	0.06
Ezama Castro Adoga	Young Progressive Party (YPP)	271	0.05
Uzong George Moses	All Blending Party (ABP)	262	0.05
Ngang Bassey Ngang	Democratic People's Party (DPP)	244	0.05
Ntami Nkanu Esege	People's Party of Nigeria (PPN)	124	0.02
Ofem Ubi Oka	Mega Party of Nigeria (MPN)	109	0.02
Arit Edet Aikpong	National Action Council (NAC)	107	0.02
Ebughe Kenneth	Alliance for Democracy (AD)	95	0.02
Omari Fredrick Eje	Justice Must Prevail Party (JMPP)	78	0.01
Michael Sunday	Independent Democrats (ID)	60	0.01
Ubi Hossana Ukonu	Democratic Peoples Congress (DPC)	52	0.01
Godwin Daniel Pastor	Mass Action Joint Alliance (MAJA)	49	0.01
Eno Eno Enang	Accord (A)	34	0.01
Mkposong Ekete Mkposong	Kowa Party (KP)	33	0.01
Charles Offiong	Democratic Alternative (DA)	27	0.01
Inah Thomas Enyi	Coalition for Change (C4C)	25	0.00
Ekeng Effiom Effiom	Action Alliance (AA)	22	0.00
Morphy Pamela Ubagidi	Change Advocacy Party (CAP)	14	0.00
Total		522,309	100.00
Valid votes		522,309	97.85
Invalid/blank votes		11,499	2.15
Total votes		533,808	100.00
Registered voters/turnout		1,486,026	35.92
Source: INEC

== Delta State ==
One-term PDP incumbent Ifeanyi Okowa sought re-election and won the PDP nomination while businessman Great Ogboru became his main opponent by winning the APC nomination. Okowa won re-election, 80–19.

Candidate	Party	Votes	%
Ifeanyi Arthur Okowa	People's Democratic Party (PDP)	925,274	80.17
Great Ovedje Ogboru	All Progressives Congress (APC)	215,938	18.71
Chukwu Prince Joe	African Democratic Congress (ADC)	2,032	0.18
Richard Kimeku	Democratic People's Party (DPP)	1,185	0.10
Akwara John Ogheneovo	Social Democratic Party (SDP)	1,136	0.10
Ashikodi David	Accord (A)	1,027	0.09
Mohammed Oluremi Jane Batsone	People for Democratic Change (PDC)	1,001	0.09
Frank Ufuoma Esanobi	African Action Congress (AAC)	914	0.08
Obire Odiakpo Justine	Progressive Peoples Alliance (PPA)	549	0.05
Odibo Golly Hannah Atata	Advanced Congress of Democrats (ACD)	429	0.04
Edward Okiya	Labour Party (LP)	411	0.04
Onikiti Helen	Advanced Peoples Democratic Alliance (APDA)	331	0.03
Ajaguogbadim Joshua Patrick Chidinma	United Progressive Party (UPP)	321	0.03
Augustine Chukwuemeka Obi	Re-build Nigeria Party (RBNP)	294	0.03
Gabriel Mamuzo	Nigeria People's Congress (NPC)	284	0.02
Brando Omu	All Grand Alliance Party (AGAP)	275	0.02
Monu-Olarewaju Theodora Chime	Advanced Allied Party (AAP)	258	0.02
Michael Egoh	Action Democratic Party (ADP)	228	0.02
Ejumedia Prince Sunny	Hope Democratic Party (HDP)	224	0.02
Illoh Awele Onyisi	Mega Party of Nigeria (MPN)	183	0.02
Enwose Williams B. N.	Freedom and Justice Party (FJP)	180	0.02
Isamade Paul	Allied Congress Party of Nigeria (ACPN)	162	0.01
Victor Egwuenu	People's Party of Nigeria (PPN)	134	0.01
Godwin Mojume Asikawali	Justice Must Prevail Party (JMPP)	115	0.01
America Emmanuel Ogheneochuko	National Rescue Movement (NRM)	110	0.01
Gordson Korogha Enhubareh	National Conscience Party (NCP)	100	0.01
Bidokwu Emeka	Action Alliance (AA)	98	0.01
Cosmos Annabel	Association for Better Nigeria (ABN)	92	0.01
Umudjane Sylvester Omonigho	Better Nigeria Progressive Party (BNPP)	95	0.01
Lucky Dikadi	People's Redemption Party (PRP)	83	0.01
Amaye John Oghenemohwo	Allied Peoples Movement (APM)	70	0.01
Ossai Edward Olie	Grassroots Development Party of Nigeria (GDPN)	61	0.01
Ejiro Odu Tolbert	National Interest Party (NIP)	59	0.01
Friday Udumebraye Togbe	Sustainable National Party (SNP)	51	0.00
Jean Chiazor Anishere	People's Trust (PT)	49	0.00
Olotu Stanley Omohwo	Reformed Advanced Party (RAP)	46	0.00
Efetoboh Patricia	National Action Council (NAC)	41	0.00
Iselegwu Clement	Restoration Party of Nigeria (RP)	39	0.00
Nkwoala Emeka Mathias	Zenith Labour Party (ZLP)	38	0.00
Obiodogwu Augustine	Democratic Alternative (DA)	33	0.00
Okolugbo Gloria	Change Advocacy Party (CAP)	30	0.00
Anthony Mejebi Clarke	Green Party of Nigeria (GPN)	29	0.00
Edozien Leroy Chuma	Alliance of Social Democrats (ASD)	25	0.00
Anyiraodiakaose Nelly	Nigeria Community Movement Party (NCMP)	25	0.00
Enuakpoje Peters Erho	Independent Democrats (ID)	31	0.00
Oghotevwo Lucky Oyovwi	Movement for the Restoration and Defence of Democracy (MRDD)	25	0.00
Atagbuzia Chibueze Sixtus	Kowa Party (KP)	22	0.00
Endurance Udubrai Eddy	National Democratic Liberty Party (NDLP)	21	0.00
Okotcha Odinma Eric	Mass Action Joint Alliance (MAJA)	15	0.00
Obichie David Egwebuike	Nigeria for Democracy (NFD)	15	0.00
Total		1,154,188	100.00
Valid votes		1,154,188	97.95
Invalid/blank votes		24,147	2.05
Total votes		1,178,335	100.00
Registered voters/turnout		2,831,205	41.62
Source: INEC

== Ebonyi State ==
One-term PDP incumbent Dave Umahi sought re-election and won the PDP nomination while Ebonyi South Senator Sonni Ogbuoji became his main opponent by winning the APC nomination. Umahi won re-election, 82–17.

Candidate	Party	Votes	%
Dave Umahi	People's Democratic Party	393,043	81.54
Sonni Ogbuoji	All Progressives Congress	81,703	16.95
Other candidates		7,272	1.51
Total		482,018	100.00
Valid votes		482,018	97.77
Invalid/blank votes		10,984	2.23
Total votes		493,002	100.00
Registered voters/turnout		1,432,528	34.41
Source: Independent Newspapers Nigeria

== Enugu State ==
One-term PDP incumbent Ifeanyi Ugwuanyi sought re-election and won the PDP nomination while former Enugu North Senator Ayogu Eze became his main opponent by winning the APC nomination. Okowa won re-election, 96–2.

Candidate	Party	Votes	%
Ifeanyi Ugwuanyi	Peoples Democratic Party	449,935	95.54
Ayogu Eze	All Progressives Congress	10,423	2.21
Nwankpa Emmanuel Benedict Ebelechukwu	APGA	2,547	0.54
Ozoemena Donatus Madubuike	UDP	1,648	0.35
Peter Onwurah Aniagboso	SDP	1,476	0.31
Uzodinmma Ekene Andrew	UPP	854	0.18
Eze Cajetan	ADC	581	0.12
Egbo Emmanuel Maduka	APA	554	0.12
Onyeka Chinedu	NUP	463	0.10
Owoh Celestine Chukwudi	PPC	271	0.06
Chidi Cadet Nwanyanwu	AAC	260	0.06
Okolo Louis Ugwu	ID	194	0.04
Nnaji Victor Ifeanyi	ADP	175	0.04
Nnamani Obioma N	PPN	174	0.04
Anozie Nnenna Mary	FRESH	156	0.03
Ugwuanyi Celestina Anita	NRM	145	0.03
Chinedu Anuche	KP	93	0.02
Prince Onyishi Sunday Chukwuemeka	NNPP	83	0.02
Okechukwu Slyvanus	AGA	76	0.02
Nweze Hyacinth	RBNP	75	0.02
Anthonia Nwobodo Nneka	ACD	62	0.01
Gerald Abonyi (Esq)	LP	61	0.01
Ani Afamefuna Samuel	GPN	59	0.01
Ogbonna Joshua Jekwu	ANP	57	0.01
Ifeoma Nnoli-udeze	MPN	54	0.01
Ozoemene Maureen Onwunta	NIP	53	0.01
Chibueze Francis Onah	SNP	53	0.01
Okonkwo Chigozie Augustine	NEPP	48	0.01
Ifeadigo Ben Ani	ZLP	37	0.01
Ugwu Martins Chiesozib	JMPP	36	0.01
Franklin Emeka Ugwu	ANDP	33	0.01
Adjai Robinson Chukwuemeka	CC	30	0.01
Chukwuka Ibekwe Carley	GDPN	30	0.01
Eneani Akachukwu Henry	APP	26	0.01
Egbo Alex Chibuzo	ASD	22	0.00
Amadi Eusebius Tochukwu	DA	22	0.00
Christopher Ogbu	DPC	21	0.00
Osita Agu	MMN	10	0.00
Odumejemba Chinonyelum Vicgeaial	NCP	10	0.00
Edwin Egbuaba Ngene	MRDD	7	0.00
Orji Jide Abraham	NAC	7	0.00
Ugwu John Chukwuweike	CAP	6	0.00
Total		470,927	100.00
Valid votes		470,927	98.47
Invalid/blank votes		7,314	1.53
Total votes		478,241	100.00
Registered voters/turnout		19,448,803	2.46

== Gombe State ==
Two-term PDP incumbent Ibrahim Hassan Dankwambo was ineligible for re-election due to term limits. 2015 APC gubernatorial nominee Muhammad Inuwa Yahaya won the APC nomination while Gombe North Senator Usman Bayero Nafada won the PDP nomination. Yahaya defeated Nafada, 60–37.

== Imo State ==
Two-term APC incumbent Rochas Okorocha was ineligible for re-election due to term limits. Imo West Senator Hope Uzodinma won the APC nomination, former Deputy House Speaker Emeka Ihedioha won the PDP nomination, former Imo North Senator Ifeanyi Ararume won the APGA nomination, and Okorocha's Chief of Staff Uche Nwosu became the AA nominee after losing the APC primary. Initial results showed Ihedioha winning with 38% while Nwosu, Ararume, and Uzodinma received 27%, 16%, and 14%, respectively. Ihedioha received the certificate of return and governed until 14 January 2020 when the Supreme Court declared Uzodinma the winner and he took office as Governor.

== Jigawa State ==
One-term incumbent Mohammed Badaru Abubakar sought re-election and won the APC nomination while former Chief of Staff to Governor Sule Lamido Aminu Ibrahim Ringim became his main opponent by winning the PDP nomination. Abubakar won re-election, 74–26.

Candidate	Party	Votes	%
Mohammed Badaru Abubakar	All Progressives Congress	810,933	73.51
Aminu Ibrahim Ringim	People's Democratic Party	288,356	26.14
Other candidates		3,827	0.35
Total		1,103,116	100.00
Valid votes		1,103,116	97.86
Invalid/blank votes		24,152	2.14
Total votes		1,127,268	100.00
Registered voters/turnout		1,163,206	96.91
Source: Dailypost

== Kaduna State ==
One-term APC incumbent Nasir Ahmad el-Rufai sought re-election and won the APC nomination while former Representative Isah Ashiru became his main opponent by winning the PDP nomination. Abubakar won re-election, 55–43.

Candidate	Party	Votes	%
Nasir Ahmad el-Rufai	All Progressives Congress (APC)	1,045,427	55.32
Isah Ashiru	People's Democratic Party (PDP)	814,168	43.08
Haruna Saeed	Social Democratic Party (SDP)	9,828	0.52
Ahmad Tijjani Omar	People's Redemption Party (PRP)	5,626	0.30
Polycarp Danladi Gankon	All Progressives Grand Alliance (APGA)	2,405	0.13
Sani Abdulkadir	New Nigeria People's Party (NNPP)	2,025	0.11
Othman Mustapha Bakano	African Peoples Alliance (APA)	1,987	0.11
Muhammad Kabir Uthman	Mega Party of Nigeria (MPN)	1,533	0.08
Muhammed Aliyu Galadima	National Rescue Movement (NRM)	1,151	0.06
Ibrahim Suleiman	African Democratic Congress (ADA)	1,011	0.05
Abubakar Aliyu	Change Advocacy Party (CAP)	663	0.04
Kabir Ahmed Jibril	Progressive Peoples Party (PPA)	594	0.03
Solomon Yahaya Ikagwu	Nigeria People's Congress (NPC)	449	0.02
Metoh H. Yakubu	All Grassroots Party (AGA)	324	0.02
Abdullahi Awwal Aliyu	United Democratic Party (UDP)	316	0.02
Ahmad Muhammad	Green Party of Nigeria (GPN)	238	0.01
Salim Muhammad	African Peoples Party (APP)	162	0.01
Emmanuel Parah Bako	National Conscience Party (NCP)	162	0.01
Adamu Idris Chado	Democratic Peoples Congress (DPC)	157	0.01
Shehu Abubakar	People's Party of Nigeria (PPN)	147	0.01
Aminu Sabo	Alliance for New Nigeria (ANN)	133	0.01
Umar Ibrahim Farouk	Labour Party (LP)	125	0.01
Mansur Suleiman	Nigeria Elements Progressive Party (NEPP)	121	0.01
Umar Uba	National Interest Party (NIP)	102	0.01
Yahaya Alhassan Marafa	Unity Party of Nigeria (UPN)	99	0.01
Jamilu Mohammad	Accord (A)	97	0.01
Shika Rabiatu Sulaiman	National Action Council (NAC)	88	0.00
Muhammad Fatima Binta	Restoration Party of Nigeria (RP)	86	0.00
Umar Suleiman	Democratic Alternative (DA)	74	0.00
Suleiman Abdulrasheed	Masses Movement of Nigeria (MMN)	68	0.00
Abubakar Abdullahi	Zenith Labour Party (ZLP)	67	0.00
Ahmad Rabiu Bello	Hope Democratic Party (HDP)	66	0.00
Muhammed Jibrin Muntaka	Independent Democrats (ID)	58	0.00
Halliru Tafida Abdullahi	Movement for the Restoration and Defence of Democracy (MRDD)	52	0.00
Ezekiel Habila	Liberation Movement (LM)	36	0.00
Iliyasu Aminu Mustapha	Action Alliance (AA)	32	0.00
Yusuf Abdulfatai	We The People Nigeria (WTPN)	23	0.00
Muhammed Umar	Justice Must Prevail Party (JMPP)	14	0.00
Total		1,889,714	100.00
Registered voters/turnout		3,932,492	–
Source: INEC

== Kano State ==
One-term APC incumbent Abdullahi Umar Ganduje sought re-election and won the APC nomination while former Commissioner of Works, Housing and Transport Abba Kabir Yusuf became his main opponent by winning the PDP nomination. The election was declared inconclusive with Kabir Yusuf in the lead but the supplementary elections in certain areas pushed Ganduje to win re-election, 50.2-49.8.

== Katsina State ==
One-term APC incumbent Aminu Bello Masari sought re-election and won the APC nomination while Katsina South Senator Garba Yakubu Lado became his main opponent by winning the PDP nomination. Masari won re-election, 70–29.

Candidate	Party	Votes	%
Aminu Bello Masari	All Progressives Congress	1,178,864	70.04
Garba Yakubu Lado	People's Democratic Party	488,621	29.03
Other candidates		15,560	0.92
Total		1,683,045	100.00
Valid votes		1,683,045	97.82
Invalid/blank votes		37,593	2.18
Total votes		1,720,638	100.00
Registered voters/turnout		3,230,230	53.27
Source: Dailytrust

== Kebbi State ==
One-term APC incumbent Abubakar Atiku Bagudu sought re-election and won the APC nomination while Kebbi North Senator Isa Mohammed Galaudu became his main opponent by winning the PDP nomination. Bagudu won re-election, 85–13.

Candidate	Party	Votes	%
Abubakar Atiku Bagudu	All Progressives Congress	673,717	84.92
Isa Mohammed Galaudu	People's Democratic Party	106,633	13.44
Other candidates		13,038	1.64
Total		793,388	100.00
Valid votes		793,388	97.46
Invalid/blank votes		20,696	2.54
Total votes		814,084	100.00
Registered voters/turnout		1,789,975	45.48
Source: DailyPost

== Kogi State ==
One-term APC incumbent Yahaya Bello sought election and won the APC nomination while engineer Musa Wada became his main opponent by winning the PDP nomination. Bello won, 67–31.

Candidate	Party	Votes	%
Yahaya Bello	All Progressives Congress	406,222	66.51
Musa Wada	People's Democratic Party	189,704	31.06
Other candidates		14,818	2.43
Total		610,744	100.00
Valid votes		610,744	97.80
Invalid/blank votes		13,770	2.20
Total votes		624,514	100.00
Registered voters/turnout		1,646,350	37.93
Source: Vanguard News

== Kwara State ==
Two-term PDP incumbent Abdulfatah Ahmed was ineligible for re-election due to term limits. 2015 PDP Kwara Central Senate nominee AbdulRahman AbdulRazaq won the APC nomination while Representative Razak Atunwa won the PDP nomination. AbdulRazaq defeated Atunwa, 73–25.

Candidate	Party	Votes	%
AbdulRahman AbdulRazaq	All Progressives Congress (APC)	331,546	73.12
Razak Atunwa	People's Democratic Party (PDP)	114,754	25.31
Tiamiyu Kolapo Kamorudeen	Progressive Peoples Alliance (PPA)	1,482	0.33
Sharafadeen A. Kolawole Aderemmy	African Peoples Alliance (APA)	1,163	0.26
Ayorinde O. Adedoyin	Accord (A)	860	0.19
Aransiola Ezekiel	People for Democratic Change (PDC)	432	0.10
Manzuma Issa	African Democratic Congress (ADC)	391	0.09
Adisa Ismail Abayomi	Action Alliance (AA)	378	0.08
Mohammed Abubakar Mohammed	Allied Peoples Movement (APM)	293	0.06
Tunde Muritala O.	Allied Congress Party of Nigeria (ACPN)	272	0.06
Olajide Joseph Adebola	Social Democratic Party (SDP)	209	0.05
Oniye Shina Hammed	Action Democratic Party (ADP)	179	0.04
Abdulazeez Yinka Oniyangi	New Progressive Movement (NPM)	148	0.03
Mohammad Liman Abdullahi	Alliance Network Party (ANP)	134	0.03
Abdulmumin Yinka Ajia	Abundant Nigeria Renewal Party (ANRP)	115	0.03
Tosho Babatunde Omotosho A.	Nigeria Elements Progressive Party (NEPP)	108	0.02
Belgore Ahmad Kawu	Justice Must Prevail Party (JMPP)	105	0.02
Ibrahim Abdullahi Anifowoshe	Movement for the Restoration and Defence of Democracy (MRDD)	86	0.02
Aina Ayodeji Adetunji	All Blending Party (ABP)	83	0.02
Ayinla John Oloruntoba	National Conscience Party (NCP)	74	0.02
Popoola Kehinde Adeyemi	National Rescue Movement (NRM)	74	0.02
Paul Ajiroba	People's Party of Nigeria (PPN)	67	0.01
Soladoye Samuel Sunday	Unity Party of Nigeria (UPN)	61	0.01
Yahaya Kale Saádu	Mass Action Joint Alliance (MAJA)	57	0.01
Rukayat Toyin Tijani	Mega Party of Nigeria (MPN)	53	0.01
Alabi Morankinyo	Kowa Party (KP)	48	0.01
Issa Aremu Obalowu	Labour Party (LP)	45	0.01
Adekunle Kehinde	Change Advocacy Party (CAP)	40	0.01
Oyabambi Adetunji	United Democratic Party (UDP)	40	0.01
Babatunde Omotosho Tayo	Better Nigeria Progressive Party (BNPP)	34	0.01
Abdullahi Mohammed	Democratic Alternative (DA)	28	0.01
Comfort Yinka Kayode	United Progressive Party (UPP)	24	0.01
Omotosho Bamidele Olaitan	Green Party of Nigeria (GPN)	21	0.00
Oshin Bayo David Alaba	We The People Nigeria (WTPN)	15	0.00
35 Bada Abullahi Yekini	Young Democratic Party (YDP)	14	0.00
Total		453,433	100.00
Valid votes		453,433	97.84
Invalid/blank votes		9,994	2.16
Total votes		463,427	100.00
Registered voters/turnout		1,376,372	33.67
Source: INEC

== Lagos State ==
One-term APC incumbent Akinwunmi Ambode sought re-election but lost the APC nomination to former Commissioner Babajide Sanwo-Olu. 2015 PDP gubernatorial nominee Jimi Agbaje became his main opponent by winning the PDP nomination. Sanwo-Olu defeated Agbaje, 76–21.

Lagos State gubernatorial election, 2019
Party	Candidate	Votes	%	±%
APC	Babajide Sanwoolu	739,445	76.65	
PDP	Jimi Agbaje	206,141	21.09	
ADP	Babatunde Gbadamosi	4,780	0.49	
A	Joseph Beckley	4,122	0.42	
ADC	Olumuyiwa Fafowora	3,544	0.36	
YPP	Princess Adebisi Ogunsanya	1,604	0.16	
Majority		958,032	98.01	
Turnout		1,122,416		
APC hold		Swing		

== Nasarawa State ==
Two-term APC incumbent Umaru Tanko Al-Makura was ineligible for re-election due to term limits. Businessman Abdullahi Sule won the APC nomination while Representative David Ombugadu won the PDP nomination and former Federal Minister of Information Labaran Maku won the APGA nomination. Sule defeated Ombugadu and Maku, 49-27-20.

Candidate	Party	Votes	%
Abdullahi Sule	All Progressives Congress	327,229	48.78
David Ombugadu	People's Democratic Party	184,281	27.47
Labaran Maku	All Progressives Grand Alliance	132,784	19.79
Ibio Umar Aliyu Doma	Zenith Labour Party	13,307	1.98
Ishaq Ahmed Kana	Social Democratic Party	7,442	1.11
Suleiman Umaru Ajaja	Action Democratic Party	1,355	0.20
Zaggi Rabo Zakka	African Democratic Congress	1,319	0.20
Mustapha Momammed Alfa	Allied Peoples Movement	773	0.12
Tanko Malam	Progressive Peoples Alliance	679	0.10
Animiku Anthony Kukumah	All Grassroots Alliance	526	0.08
Aliyu Danjuma Dogara	Nigeria For Democracy	258	0.04
Mohammed Ahmadu Adamu	Peoples Party Of Nigeria	186	0.03
Ombugadu Victor	Advanced Congress of Democrats	97	0.01
Sale Yahaya Alaji	Providence Peoples Congress	85	0.01
Anjugu Abimku Moses	Justice Must Prevail Party	82	0.01
Haruna Iliyasu Shauaibu	Independent Democrats	79	0.01
Matthew Avre Ombugaku	Re-Build Nigeria	72	0.01
Mohammed Awwal Suleiman	KOWA Party	49	0.01
Nyam Mark Maida	People's Trust	46	0.01
Ismalia Taofiq	Democratic People's Congress	38	0.01
Peter Helen	Masses Movement of Nigeria	38	0.01
Bako Ahmed	Non-constituency Member of Parliament	33	0.00
Kreni Danju Mantani	Young Progressives Party	33	0.00
Aba Joseph R.	Alliance of Social Democrats	28	0.00
Theohius Gyado Madaki	Change Advocacy Party	16	0.00
Mohammed Nazir Adamu	Green Party of Nigeria	12	0.00
Cerrone Solo Waziri	Mass Action Joint Alliance Party	12	0.00
Sale Yahaya Alaji	People's Redemption Party	12	0.00
Khalid Shuaibu Mairiga	Democratic Alternative	7	0.00
Total		670,878	100.00
Valid votes		670,878	98.46
Invalid/blank votes		10,521	1.54
Total votes		681,399	100.00
Registered voters/turnout		1,617,786	42.12
Source: INEC

== Niger State ==
One-term APC incumbent Abubakar Sani Bello sought re-election and won the APC nomination while 2015 PDP gubernatorial nominee Umar Nasko became his main opponent by winning the PDP nomination. Bello won re-election, 58–33.

Candidate	Party	Votes	%
Abubakar Sani Bello	All Progressives Congress	526,412	58.43
Umar Nasko	People's Democratic Party	298,065	33.09
Other candidates		76,394	8.48
Total		900,871	100.00
Valid votes		900,871	97.87
Invalid/blank votes		19,609	2.13
Total votes		920,480	100.00
Registered voters/turnout		2,377,034	38.72
Source: Ripples Nigeria

== Ogun State ==
Two-term APC incumbent Ibikunle Amosun was ineligible for re-election due to term limits. Businessman Dapo Abiodun won the APC nomination, banker Gboyega Nasir Isiaka won the ADC nomination, Ogun East Senator Buruji Kashamu won the PDP nomination, and Representative Adekunle Akinlade became the APM nominee after losing the APC primary. Abiodun won with 35% while Akinlade, Isiaka, and Kashamu received 33%, 16%, and 10%, respectively.

Ogun State gubernatorial election, 2019
Party	Candidate	Votes	%	±%
APC	Dapo Abiodun	241,670	35.49	
Allied Peoples Movement	Adekunle Akinlade	222,153	32.62	
African Democratic Congress	Gboyega Nasir Isiaka	110,422	16.22	
People's Democratic Party	Buruji Kashamu	70,290	10.32	
Action Democratic Party	Dimeji Bankole	9,666	1.42	
Majority		654,201	96.07	
Turnout		712,743		
APC hold		Swing		

== Oyo State ==
Two-term APC incumbent Abiola Ajimobi was ineligible for re-election due to term limits. Former CBN Deputy Governor for Operations Adebayo Adelabu won the APC nomination while 2015 SDP gubernatorial nominee Seyi Makinde won the PDP nomination. Makinde defeated Adelabu, 56–39.

Candidate	Party	Votes	%
Seyi Makinde	People's Democratic Party	515,621	56.24
Adebayo Adelabu	All Progressives Congress	357,982	39.04
Olufemi Lanlehin	African Democratic Congress	12,375	1.35
Christopher Alao-Akala	Action Democratic Party	8,664	0.94
Sarafadeen Abiodun Alli	Zenith Labour Party	3,650	0.40
Akinde Akin S	People For Democratic Change	1,759	0.19
Saheed Adegboyega Ajadi	Accord	1,514	0.17
Alao Oyedeleh Oyebode	Alliance for Democracy	1,425	0.16
Omobosola Owolabi Golohor	Democratic People's Party	1,401	0.15
Rotimi Akande	United Progressive Party	1,064	0.12
Taiwo Obiyemi Otegbeye	Providence People's Congress	1,025	0.11
Tolulope Adeyeye Adedoyin	African People Alliance	1,007	0.11
Akinboye Tijani Ismaila	Hope Democratic Party	926	0.10
Akinwale Babatunde Laosun	African Action Congress	814	0.09
Akande Taiwo Risikat	Advanced Congress of Democrats	780	0.09
Olalekan Oladotun Ayorinde	Abundant Nigeria Renewal Party	663	0.07
Mobolaji Ayorinde	Social Democratic Party	660	0.07
Ojo Olayinka Kayode	Mega Party of Nigeria	602	0.07
Victor-Tade Adenike Morenike	Advanced Allied Party	574	0.06
David Oluwafemi Okunlola	All Grassroots Alliance	564	0.06
Sarumi-Aliyu Ashabi Bolanle	National Interest Party	382	0.04
Olatunji Adigun Sadiq	Labour Party	336	0.04
Yinusa Kazeem Ayandoye	National Rescue Movement	316	0.03
Ayoade Belawu Adebola	Nigeria Elements Progressive Party	267	0.03
Gbadamosi Basiru Alagbe	People's Party of Nigeria	243	0.03
Babarinde Oye Ademola	Democratic People's Congress	230	0.03
Edward Olufeyisanyo Ladoye	New Progressive Movement	206	0.02
Oladdunni Ariyo Olaitan	Better Nigeria Progressive Party	205	0.02
Adegboyega A. Adeeu	Democratic Alternative	192	0.02
Okemakinde Ramota Fumilayo	All Blended Party	182	0.02
Olabode Ayodele Johnson	Alliance for New Nigeria	169	0.02
Oladapo Wasiu Atilola	Independent Democrats	153	0.02
Oluwole Ladipo	Grassroots Development Party Of Nigeria	152	0.02
Oloyade Ayobami Michael	National Conscience Party	135	0.01
Bamigboye Abiodun E.	Socialist Party of Nigeria	114	0.01
Mogaji Mashood Odelalu	National Action Council	98	0.01
Omotosho Paul Adeboye	Coalition for Change	96	0.01
Aderoju Ismail Balogun	Mass Action Joint Alliance	75	0.01
Awolusi Olusegun Gaskin	Save Nigeria Congress	75	0.01
Paul Oluseye Smith	Justice Must Prevail Party	72	0.01
Mayoress Abiodun Olayinka O	Change Advocacy Party	46	0.01
Olaide Olayinola	KOWA Party	46	0.01
Total		916,860	100.00
Valid votes		916,860	97.79
Invalid/blank votes		20,689	2.21
Total votes		937,549	100.00
Registered voters/turnout		2,934,107	31.95
Source: INEC

== Plateau State ==
One-term APC incumbent Simon Lalong sought re-election and won the APC nomination while Plateau South Senator Jeremiah Useni became his main opponent by winning the PDP nomination. Lalong won re-election, 51–47.

Candidate	Party	Votes	%
Simon Lalong	All Progressives Congress	595,582	51.35
Jerry Useni	People's Democratic Party	546,813	47.14
Other candidates		17,559	1.51
Total		1,159,954	100.00
Valid votes		1,159,954	98.62
Invalid/blank votes		16,188	1.38
Total votes		1,176,142	100.00
Registered voters/turnout		2,480,455	47.42
Source: Daily Trust, This Day

== Rivers State ==
One-term PDP incumbent Ezenwo Nyesom Wike sought re-election and won the PDP nomination while Biokpomabo Awara became his main opponent by winning the AAC nomination as the APC were barred from running candidates. The election was suspended after violence and on April 3, INEC declared that Wike had won as the total number of voters in areas where elections were cancelled or did not hold was not enough for Awara to win. The results were Wike 83-Awara 17.

== Sokoto State ==
One-term incumbent Aminu Tambuwal switched from the APC to the PDP in 2019 and sought re-election under the PDP banner; Tambuwal won the PDP nomination while former Deputy Governor Ahmad Aliyu became his main opponent by winning the APC nomination. Tambuwal won re-election, 49.41-49.37.

Candidate	Party	Votes	%
Aminu Tambuwal	All Progressives Congress	512,002	49.41
Isa Ahmad Aliyu	People's Democratic Party	511,660	49.37
Other candidates		12,674	1.22
Total		1,036,336	100.00
Valid votes		1,036,336	97.04
Invalid/blank votes		31,662	2.96
Total votes		1,067,998	100.00
Registered voters/turnout		1,887,767	56.57
Source: TheNation

== Taraba State ==
One-term PDP incumbent Darius Ishaku sought re-election and won the PDP nomination while former Deputy Governor Sani Abubakar Danladi became his main opponent by winning the APC nomination. Ishaku won re-election, 57–40.

Candidate	Party	Votes	%
Darius Dickson Ishaku	People's Democratic Party (PDP)	520,433	57.21
Sani Abubakar Danladi	All Progressives Congress (APC)	362,735	39.87
Aisha Jummai Alhassan	United Democratic Party (UDP)	16,289	1.79
Adamu Danbako Ibrahim	All Progressives Grand Alliance (APGA)	4,098	0.45
Musa Bah Kanawa	Young Democratic Party (YDP)	1,208	0.13
Stephen Bishi	Social Democratic Party (SDP)	743	0.08
Danjuma Umaru	National Rescue Movement (NRM)	730	0.08
Sani Saidi	All Grassroots Alliance (AGA)	594	0.07
Bello Mohammed	Progressive Peoples Alliance (PPA)	564	0.06
Kwaghkar Julius Mberga	Action Alliance (AA)	471	0.05
Faruk Alhaji Muhammed	Democratic People's Party (DPP)	265	0.03
Ahmadu Umaru Salim	Young Progressive Party (YPP)	249	0.03
Kefas Sule	ABP	194	0.02
Ibrahim Manzo Mohammed	African Democratic Congress (ADC)	168	0.02
Ahmed Bala Gassol	People's Party of Nigeria (PPN)	153	0.02
Japhet Magdalene Tobbi	National Action Council (NAC)	91	0.01
Banti Henry Haniel	Action People's Party (APP)	89	0.01
Umar Abubakar	Advanced Congress of Democrats (ACD)	85	0.01
Dahiru Yunusa Shagarda	Accord (A)	77	0.01
Ahmad Murtala Isah	National Democratic Liberty Party (NDLP)	77	0.01
Bala Kabiru	Allied Congress Party of Nigeria (ACPN)	69	0.01
Phillip Soje Shin	Mega Party of Nigeria (MPN)	69	0.01
Bagarmi Kamaludeen Muhammed Soje	Movement for the Restoration and Defence of Democracy (MRDD)	49	0.01
Issa Musa	Zenith Labour Party (ZLP)	45	0.00
Bala Danlami Adi	Labour Party (LP)	44	0.00
Paul Jamasuru Tankwa	Mass Action Joint Alliance (MAJA)	37	0.00
Bello A. Ahmed	Democratic Alternative (DA)	32	0.00
Utsumiu-Nyen Akin Ishaya Missa	Change Advocacy Party (CAP)	21	0.00
Abdullahi Rabsanjani	Grassroots Development Party of Nigeria (GDPN)	20	0.00
Sanusi A. T. Hamza	Freedom and Justice Party (FJP)	17	0.00
Total		909,716	100.00
Valid votes		909,716	98.31
Invalid/blank votes		15,604	1.69
Total votes		925,320	100.00
Registered voters/turnout		1,777,105	52.07
Source: INEC, Premium Times

== Yobe State ==
Two-term APC incumbent Ibrahim Gaidam was ineligible for re-election due to term limits. Former APC National Secretary Mai Mala Buni won the APC nomination while Ambassador Umar Iliya Damagum won the PDP nomination. Buni defeated Damagum, 81–18.

Candidate	Party	Votes	%
Mai Mala Buni	All Progressives Congress	444,013	81.26
Umar Iliya Damagum	People's Democratic Party	95,703	17.52
Other candidates		6,675	1.22
Total		546,391	100.00
Valid votes		546,391	97.48
Invalid/blank votes		14,101	2.52
Total votes		560,492	100.00
Registered voters/turnout		1,365,913	41.03
Source: DailyTrust

== Zamfara State ==
Two-term APC incumbent Abdul'aziz Abubakar Yari was ineligible for re-election due to term limits. Commissioner Mukhtar Shehu Idris won the APC nomination while former Representative Bello Matawalle won the PDP nomination. Initial results showed Idris defeating Matawalle, 67–24, but due to improper holding of primaries, all APC (and thus Idris) votes were voided and Matawalle was declared winner.
