= List of political parties in Nigeria =

This is a list of political parties in Nigeria.

The Federal Republic of Nigeria has a multi-party system. The largest by National Assembly seats are the All Progressives Congress (APC) and the Peoples Democratic Party (PDP). There are also a number of smaller parties, the largest of which are the Labour Party (LP), All Progressives Grand Alliance (APGA) and Young Progressives Party (YPP) including the African Democratic Congress (ADC), Nigeria Democratic Congress (NDC), People's Redemption Party (PRP), Social Democratic Party (SDP), Boot Party (BP) and eleven other parties registered with the Independent National Electoral Commission.

== Current parties ==
=== Parties represented in the National Assembly ===
Party		Founded	Chairperson	Position	Ideology	Senate	House of Representatives	Governors	State Assemblies
All Progressives Congress	APC	2013	Abdullahi Adamu	Centre	Big tent; Buharism; Social conservatism	59 / 109	190 / 360	22 / 36	570 / 991
Peoples Democratic Party	PDP	1998	Iyorchia Ayu	Centre-right	Social conservatism; Economic liberalism	38 / 109	119 / 360	13 / 36	325 / 991
Labour Party	LP	2002	Julius Abure	Centre-left	Social democracy	8 / 109	34 / 360	1 / 36	26 / 991
New Nigeria People's Party	NNPP	2020	Rufai Ahmed Alkali	Syncretic	Welfarism; Social conservatism; Populism	2 / 109	18 / 360	1 / 36	26 / 991
Nigeria Democratic Congress	NDC	2026	Sen. Cleopas Moses Zuwoghe	center to centre-left	Pan Africanism; Federalism; civic nationalism	4 / 109	17 / 360	0 / 36	0 / 991
All Progressives Grand Alliance	APGA	2003	Victor Oye	Big tent	Nationalism; Decentralization; Progressivism	1 / 109	4 / 360	1 / 36	19 / 991
Social Democratic Party	SDP	1989	Vacant	Centre-left	Social democracy	2 / 109	2 / 360	0 / 36	0 / 991
African Democratic Congress	ADC	2005	David Mark	Big tent	Pan-Africanism	1 / 109	2 / 360	0 / 36	1 / 991
Young Progressives Party	YPP	2017	Bishop Amakiri	Centre-left	Social democracy	0 / 109	2 / 360	0 / 36	2 / 991

=== Other parties represented in state assemblies ===
Party		Founded	Chairperson	Position	Ideology	State Assemblies
Zenith Labour Party	ZLP	Unknown	Dan Nwanyanwu	Big tent	Reformism	2 / 991
Action Democratic Party	ADP	2017	Yabagi Sani	Centre	Third Way	1 / 991

=== Extra-parliamentary parties ===
Party		Founded	Chairperson	Position	Ideology
Accord	A	2010	Mohammad Lawal Nalado	Big tent	Populism; Economic interventionism
Action Alliance (Note: Formerly National Mass Movement of Nigeria (NMMN))	AA	2005	Adekunle Rufai Omo-Aje	Big tent	Reformism
African Action Congress	AAC	2018	Leonard Nzenwa (Acting)	Left-wing	Social democracy; Progressivism; Participatory democracy
Allied Peoples Movement	APM	2018	Yusuf Mamman Dantalle	Big tent	Decentralization; Sustainable development
Action Peoples Party	APP	Unknown	Uchenna Nnadi	Big tent	Populism; Economic interventionism
Boot Party	BP	2019	Sonny Adenuga	Big tent	Reformism
National Rescue Movement	NRM	2017	Isaac Chigozie Udeh	Big tent	Reformism

=== Unregistered parties ===
The following active (or recently active) parties are not currently registered with the Independent National Electoral Commission. After the 2019 elections, INEC deregistered 74 political parties for failing to "satisfy the requirements" of continued registration based on their poor performances during the elections. However, many of these parties are still organizationally active as the deregistration of 23 of the parties is being challenged in court as of 2022 while the complete deregistration Supreme Court case was only settled in May 2021. There are also prospective parties, like the revival of the Movement of the People, where there is yet to be a decision on their registration.

- Abundant Nigeria Renewal Party (ANRP)
- Advanced Allied Party (AAP)
- Advanced Congress of Democrats (ACD)
- Advanced Nigeria Democratic Party (ANDP)
- Advanced Peoples Democratic Alliance (APDA)
- African People Alliance (APA)
- All Blended Party (ABP)
- All Grand Alliance Party (AGAP)
- All Grassroots Alliance (AGA)
- Alliance National Party (ANP)
- Alliance Of Social Democrats (ASD)
- Alliance for Democracy (AD)
- Alliance for New Nigeria (ANN)
- Alliance for a United Nigeria (AUN)
- Allied Congress Party Of Nigeria (ACPN)
- Alternative Party of Nigeria (APN)
- Better Nigeria Progressive Party (BNPP)
- Change Advocacy Party (CAP)
- Change Nigeria Party (CNP)
- Coalition For Change (C4C)
- Communist Party of Nigeria (CPN)
- Congress of Patriots (COP)
- Democratic Alternative (DA)
- Democratic People's Party (DPP)
- Democratic People’s Congress (DPC)
- Democratic Socialist Movement (DSM)
- Freedom And Justice Party (FJP)
- Fresh Democratic Party (FDP)
- Grassroots Development Party Of Nigeria (GDPN)
- Green Party of Nigeria (GPN)
- Hope Democratic Party (HDP)
- Independent Democrats (ID)
- Justice Must Prevail Party (JMPP)
- KOWA Party (KP)
- Legacy Party of Nigeria (LPN)
- Liberation Movement (LM)
- Mass Action Joint Alliance (MAJA)
- Masses Movement of Nigeria (MMN)
- Mega Party Of Nigeria (MPN)
- Modern Democratic Party (MDP)
- Movement for the Restoration and Defence of Democracy (MRDD)
- Movement of the People (MOP)
- National Action Council (NAC)
- National Conscience Party (NCP)
- National Democratic Liberty Party (NDLP)
- National Interest Party (NIP)
- National Unity Party (NUP)
- New Generations Party of Nigeria (NGP)
- New Progressive Movement (NPM)
- Nigeria Community Movement Party (NCMP)
- Nigeria Democratic Congress Party (NDCP)
- Nigeria Elements Progressive Party (NEPP)
- Nigeria For Democracy (NFD)
- Nigeria People’s Congress (NPC)
- People for Democratic Change (PDC)
- People's Progressive Party (PPP)
- People’s Democratic Movement (PDM)
- People’s Party of Nigeria (PPN)
- People’s Trust (PT)
- Progressive Peoples Alliance (PPA)
- Providence People's Congress (PPC)
- Re-Build Nigeria Party (RBNP)
- Reform and Advancement Party (RAP)
- Restoration Party of Nigeria (RP)
- Save Nigeria Congress (SNC)
- Social Democratic Mega Party (SDMP)
- Socialist Party of Nigeria (SPN)
- Sustainable National Party (SNP)
- United Democratic Party (UDP)
- United Nigeria People's Party (UNPP)
- United Patriots (UP)
- United People's Congress (UPC)
- United Progressive Party (UPP)
- Unity Party of Nigeria (UPN)
- We The People Nigeria (WTPN)
- Yes Electorates Solidarity (YES)
- Young Democratic Party (YDP)
- Youth Party (YP)

== Historical parties ==
=== First Republic ===
- Action Group
- Kano People's Party
- National Council of Nigeria and the Cameroons
- Nigerian National Democratic Party
- Northern Elements Progressive Union
- Northern People's Congress
- United Middle Belt Congress

=== Second Republic ===
- Greater Nigerian People's Party (GNPP)
- Movement of the People Party (MPP)
- National Party of Nigeria (NPN)
- Nigeria Advance Party (NAP)
- Nigerian People's Party (NPP)
- People's Redemption Party (PRP)
- Unity Party of Nigeria (UPN)

=== Third Republic ===
- National Republican Convention (NRC)
- Social Democratic Party (SDP)

=== Abacha era ===
- Democratic Party of Nigeria (DPN)
- Grassroots Democratic Movement (GDM)
- National Democratic Coalition (NADECO)
- United Nigeria Congress Party (UNCP)

=== Fourth Republic ===
- Action Congress of Nigeria (ACN)
- African Renaissance Party (ARP)
- All Democratic Peoples Movement (ADPM)
- All Nigeria Peoples Party (ANPP)
- All People's Party (APP)
- All Progressive Grand Alliance (APGA)
- Alliance for Democracy (AD)
- Citizens Popular Party (CPP)
- Congress for Progressive Change (CPC)
- Grassroot Patriotic Party (GPP)
- National Democratic Party (NDP)
- New Democrats (ND)
- Nigeria Poor People Party (NPPP)
- People's Democratic People (PDP)
- People's Salvation Party (PSP)

== See also ==
- Politics of Nigeria
- Lists of political parties; categories by country and ideology
