= 2015 Nigerian general election =

- 28–29 March 2015
- Presidential election
- Opinion polls
- Registered: 68,833,476
- Turnout: 43.65% (▼10.03pp)
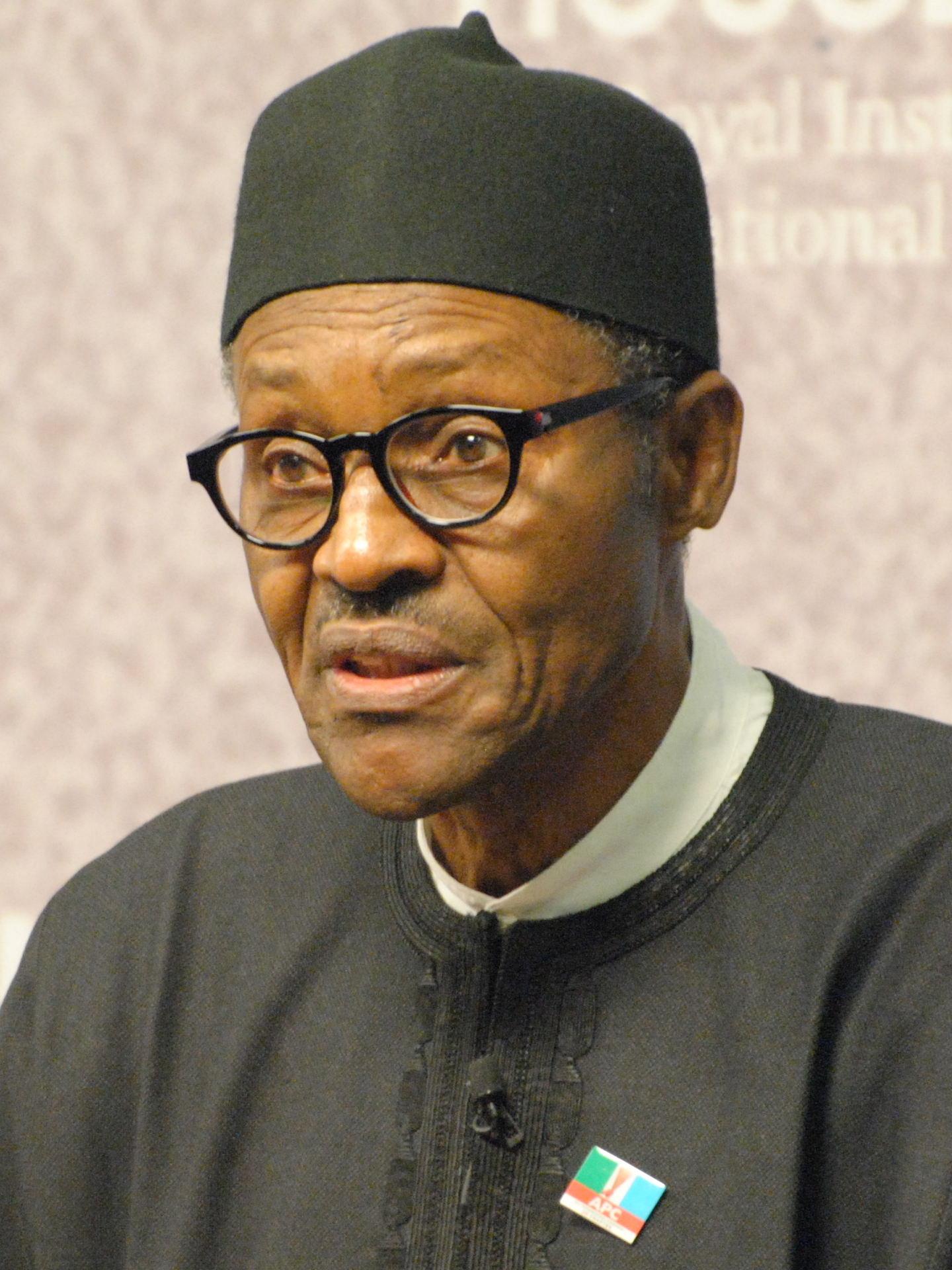

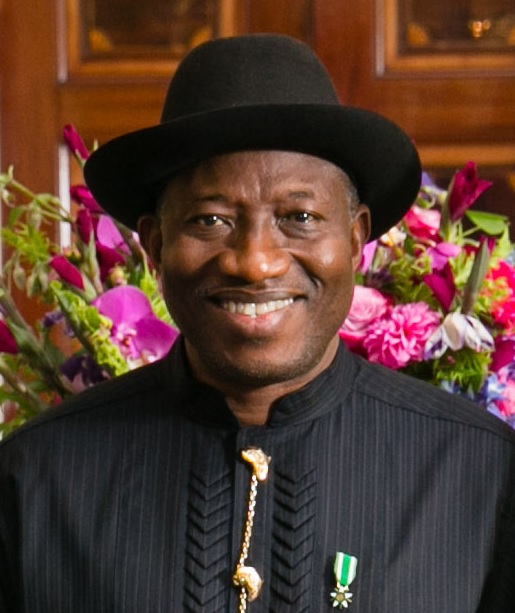
Nominee	Muhammadu Buhari	Goodluck Jonathan
Party	APC	PDP
Running mate	Yemi Osinbajo	Namadi Sambo
States carried	21	15 + FCT
Popular vote	15,424,921	12,853,162
Percentage	53.96%	44.96%
President before election
Goodluck Jonathan
PDP
Elected President
Muhammadu Buhari
APC

General elections were held in Nigeria on 28 and 29 March 2015, the fifth quadrennial election to be held since the end of military rule in 1999. Voters elected the President and members to the House of Representatives and the Senate. The incumbent president, Goodluck Jonathan, sought his second and final term.

The elections were first scheduled to be held on 14 February 2015. However, the electoral commission postponed it by six weeks to 28 March, mainly due to the poor distribution of Permanent Voter Cards, and also to curb ongoing Boko Haram insurgency in certain north-eastern states. The government closed its land and sea borders from midnight on 25 March until the end of the polling date. The election was extended to 29 March due to delays and technical problems with the biometric card readers.

It was the most expensive election ever to be held on the African continent. Opposition candidate Muhammadu Buhari won the presidential election by more than 2.5 million votes. Incumbent President Goodluck Jonathan conceded defeat on 31 March, before the results from all 36 states had been announced. This was the first time an incumbent president had lost re-election in Nigeria. The President-elect was sworn in on 29 May 2015, marking the first time since Nigeria gained independence in 1960 that a sitting government peacefully transferred power to an elected member of the opposition. Buhari flipped many states that had voted PDP in the previous election.

== Presidential election ==
Article 134 (2) of the Nigerian Constitution stipulates that a presidential candidate will be duly elected after attaining both the highest number of votes cast, and having received at least a quarter of the votes at each of at least two-thirds of the 36 states and the Federal Capital Territory (FCT). If no candidate satisfies the requirement, a second election will be held between the two leading candidates within seven days from the pronouncement of the result.

=== Party primaries ===
==== People's Democratic Party ====
It had long been assumed that incumbent President Goodluck Jonathan would run for re-election, as despite declining approval ratings, he was still thought to be popular and had several high-profile supporters. Jonathan officially confirmed his candidacy on 11 November at a rally in Abuja, announcing to cheering supporters:

After seeking the face of God, and in the quiet of my family, and after listening to the clarion call of Nigerians, I have accepted to present myself to serve a second term.

Jonathan ran unopposed in the People's Democratic Party (PDP) primaries on 10 December 2014, receiving the nomination of the party. However, this was against an unwritten rule that the PDP's presidential candidacy should alternate between Muslim northerners and Christian southerners, and opposition to Jonathan's candidacy had led to the defection of dozens of PDP MPs in the House of Representatives.

==== All Progressives Congress ====
Prior to the elections, in February 2013, the All Progressives Congress was formed as an alliance of four opposition parties, the Action Congress of Nigeria, the Congress for Progressive Change, the All Nigeria Peoples Party, and the All Progressives Grand Alliance.

Its primaries, also held on 10 December, were won by retired Major General Muhammadu Buhari, who defeated Kano State Governor Rabiu Kwankwaso, former Vice-president Atiku Abubakar, Imo State Governor Rochas Okorocha and newspaper editor Sam Nda-Isaiah. On 17 December, APC chose Professor Yemi Osinbajo as the running mate of General M. Buhari.

As of February 2015, "Though the APC's voter base is in the north, it enjoys support all over the country, unlike the opposition in 2011."

Candidate	Votes	%
Muhammadu Buhari	3,430	57.2
Rabiu Kwankwaso	974	16.3
Atiku Abubakar	954	15.9
Rochas Okorocha	400	10.4
Sam Nda-Isaiah	10	0.2
Total	5,992	100
Source: Nigerian Eye

== Presidential debate ==
A presidential and vice-presidential debate was conducted by the Nigerian media with majority of the candidates attending. The debate was attended by the then incumbent president Goodluck Jonathan, and his vice Namadi Sambo, while as predicted, the presidential candidate of the All Progressives Congress, Muhammadu Buhari boycotted the debate while his vice-presidential nominee attended. The debate which lasted for approximately an hour was watched by over 20 million people in Nigeria, with radios and the Internet conveying through other means.

=== Candidates ===
Fourteen candidates contested the election.

The main opposition Goodluck Jonathan faced was from Muhammadu Buhari of the APC. While inaugurating a 250-bed Orthopaedic Hospital in Wamakko, Buhari said: "We will stop corruption and make the ordinary people, the weak and the vulnerable our top priority".

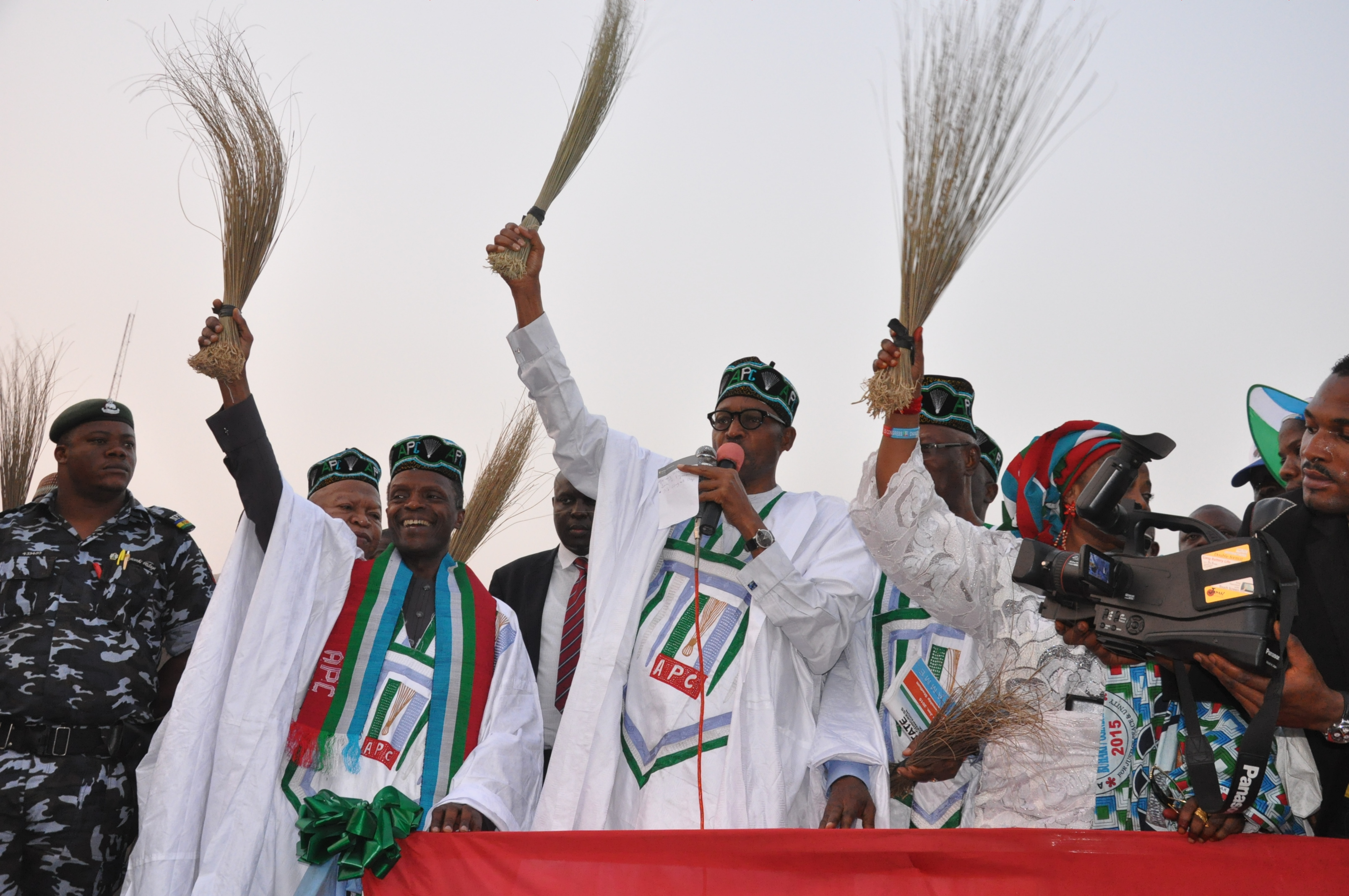
General Muhammadu Buhari holding a broom at a campaign rally.

Nominee	Running mate	Party	Acronym
Allagoa Chinedu	Arabamhen Mary	Peoples Party of Nigeria	PPN
Ambrose Albert Owuru	Haruna Shaba	Hope Party	HOPE
Adebayo Musa Ayeni	Anthony Ologbosere	African Peoples Alliance	APA
Chekwas Okorie	Bello Umar	United Progressive Party	UPP
Comfort Oluremi Sonaiya	Seidu Bobboi	KOWA Party	KOWA
Ganiyu Galadima	Ojengbede Farida	Allied Congress Party of Nigeria	ACPN
Godson Okoye	Haruna Adamu	United Democratic Party	UDP
Goodluck Jonathan	Namadi Sambo	People's Democratic Party	PDP
Mani Ahmad	Obianuju Murphy-Uzohue	African Democratic Congress	ADC
Martin Onovo	Ibrahim Mohammed	National Conscience Party	NCP
Muhammadu Buhari	Yemi Osinbajo	All Progressives Congress	APC
Rufus Salawu	Akuchie Cliff	Alliance for Democracy	AD
Sam Eke	Hassana Hassan	Citizens Popular Party	CPP
Tunde Anifowose-Kelani	Ishaka Ofemile	Accord Alliance	AA

== Conduct ==
After a botched governor's election in Anambra State, there were serious concerns that the election would not go smoothly. The country's election commission had promised a better election process, hoping that combating electoral fraud would prevent the violence that had plagued previous Nigerian elections. Despite this, a pre-election poll by Gallup noted that only 13% of Nigerians had confidence in the honesty of elections.

The Socialist Party of Nigeria filed for registration as a political party to contest the election, but the Independent National Electoral Commission (INEC) refused the registration. The SPN sued the INEC at the Federal High Court, claiming that INEC had failed to respond to their petition within 30 days as prescribed by law and that thus it would have to be registered automatically.

The presidential election was a trending topic in Nigeria on Twitter, one social media platform reflecting public opinion; although PDP/GEJ may simply have had better support on social media, which is not representative of the population as a whole. According to Impact Social, based on data from 40,000 tweets, Facebook messages, blogs, and other internet outlets that mention PDP or GEJ, 70% of public opinion toward President Jonathan is positive, but messaging on the economy has taken up 6% of election conversation and was seen as a key PDP strength. Social media support for Buhari/APC was a bit "noisier" without a single issue leveraged by the campaign to gain traction: there was general frustration that the campaign lacked consistency, content and focus on the important issues at hand. Social media also played a vital role in serving as a watchdog for the integrity of the election process, as results from polling stations were quickly posted, thus preventing electoral officials from announcing different results from the ones already publicised online.

In January 2015, the #bringbackourgirls campaign raised alarm over plans by the Independent National Electoral Commission (INEC) to exclude Chibok and some communities currently under the control of the Boko Haram from getting the permanent voter cards (PVCs) for the February elections. Jonathan's already controversial handling of the situation was exacerbated by the Twitter campaign that was launched in mid 2014, #BringBackJonathan2015, which was widely considered to be insensitive to the victims and their families. Jonathan eventually called for banners containing the hashtag to be taken down and asked for the hashtag to not be used.

=== Postponement ===
On 8 February 2015, the Independent National Electoral Commission announced that "presidential and national assembly elections will now hold on 28 March while the governorship and state assemblies election will take place on 11 April," mainly due to the poor distribution of Permanent Voter Cards, and also the security concerns related to the Boko Haram insurgency in certain north eastern states.

The postponement was called on the grounds of the INEC failing to deliver Permanent Voters' Cards to millions (around 34%) of voters – reportedly only around 45.1mn of 68.8mn registered voters had received PVC's. Additionally, on 5 February, the National Council of State (chaired by President Jonathan) told INEC that it had just launched a major, decisive offensive against Boko Haram for six weeks. Due to the assets and resources that would go into this offensive, the military would be unable to provide security and logistics support for elections. This is a disputable claim, since election security is the primary responsibility of not the military (which should only act as support) but the police and civil defence corps. There is speculation over whether or not the postponement was motivated by politics rather than security and has raised questions over the political neutrality of the military as well as the independence of INEC.

Sambo Dasuki, Nigerian national security advisor, told the commission "that operations against Boko Haram militants meant the military "will be unable to provide adequate security" for the 14 February vote." "Seventeen out of the 28 registered political parties" supported postponing the elections; 12 opposed, "including the leading opposition party, All Progressives Congress". By 30 January, "Boko Haram was in total occupation/complete control of 13 local governments (and other swathes of land) in Borno and 2 each in Yobe and Adamawa." Critics of the postponement view it as a political move on behalf of GEJ/PDP rather than one made in the interest of national security. GEJ/PDP are losing traction due to gains by Boko Haram in January, economic strains from the slide in global oil price (Nigeria's key export), and GEJ/PDP's slow progress on fighting corruption and improving infrastructure. According to primaries in December 2014, Buhari/APC is viewed as more equipped to fight insecurity and corruption.

Critics have pointed out that even with the postponement, the Nigerian government is unlikely to re-establish control in all the affected areas by the date of the election. Distribution of the Permanent Voters' Card (PVC) has begun in camps for internally displaced persons (IDPs) from the three affected states. Estimates of the number of IDPs range from 868,235 to 1.5 million people and is not yet clear how successful efforts will be to organise elections under these circumstances. Key Government officials in Nigeria are publicly stating their opposition to the postponement. Senator Chris Ngige, for example, has accused the PDP of pressuring INEC to postpone the general elections.

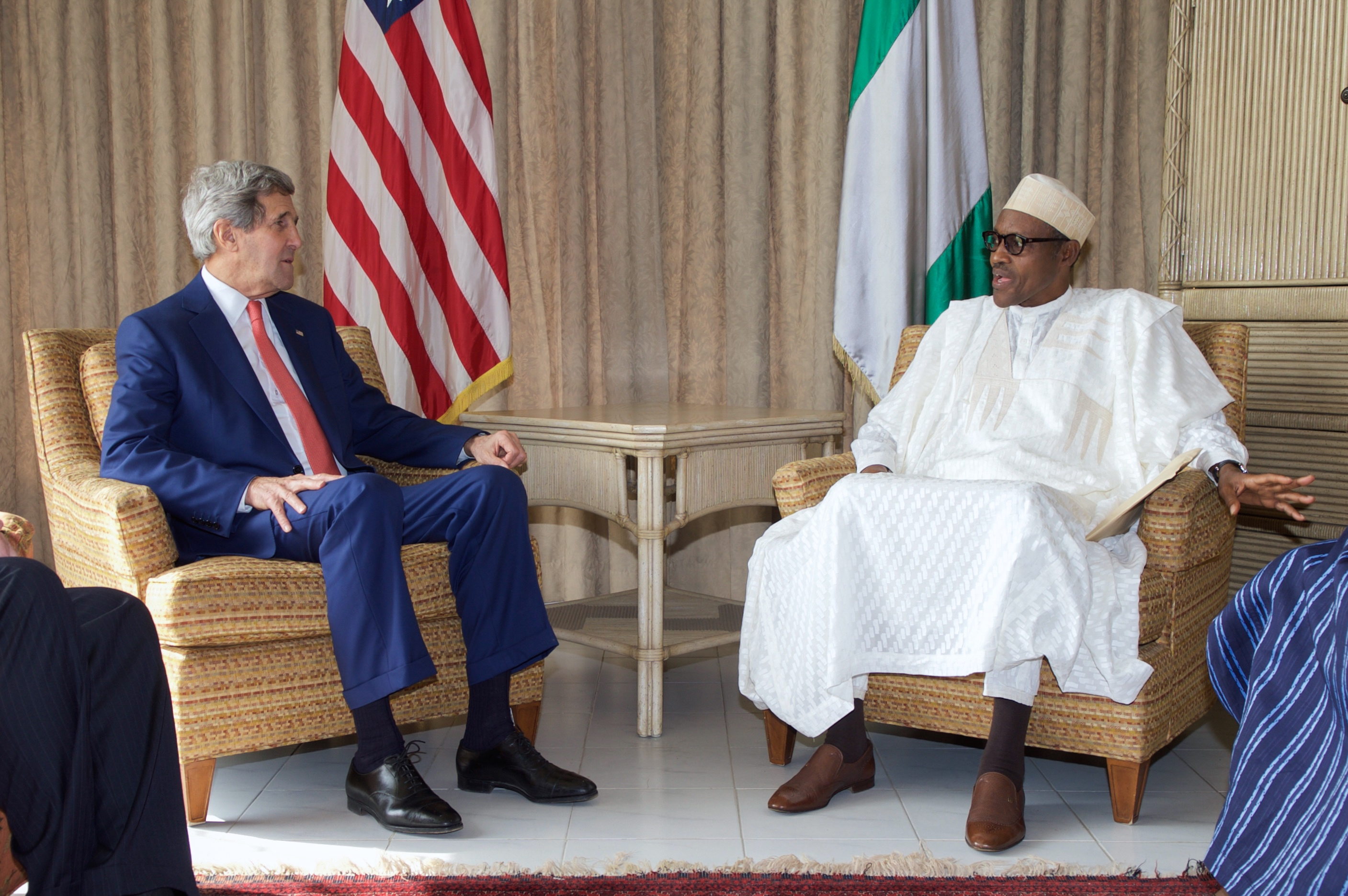
US Secretary of State meeting the two leading candidates.

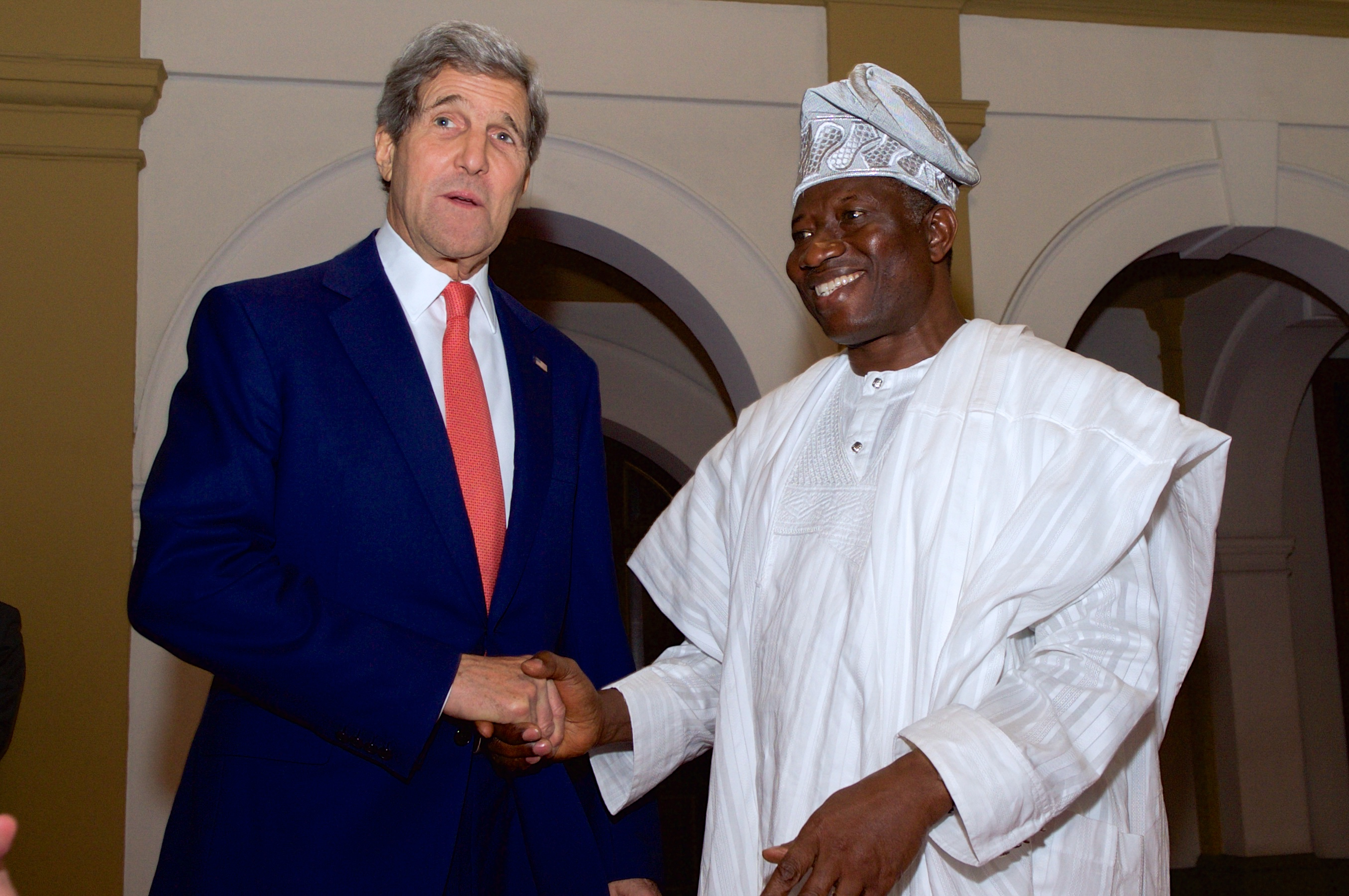

In addition to growing criticism within Nigeria, on 8 February Vanguard reported that "the United States said it was 'deeply disappointed' by the delay." US Secretary of State John Kerry, who had urged that elections be held on time, "[warned] the Nigerian government against using 'security concerns as a pretext for impeding the democratic process.'" Additionally, the British Foreign Secretary, Philip Hammond, has revealed that he, too, is disgruntled by the news: "The security situation should not be used as a reason to deny the Nigerian people from exercising their democratic rights. It is vital that the elections are kept on track and held as soon as possible". Deutsche Welle reported that "The postponement has been seen by critics as a ploy by President Goodluck Jonathan and the ruling People's Democratic Party (PDP) to buy time to sway support from the popular main opposition candidate and former military dictator, Muhammadu Buhari."

By 7 February 2015, threats of post-election violence from both sides remained a concern, given that hundreds of people died in the rioting that followed the 2011 Nigerian presidential election, and rhetoric was running high. It was reported that "the Council of Imams and Ulamas in Kaduna State ... told the Niger Delta militants threatening chaos if President Goodluck Jonathan loses the presidential election that they stand to lose if there is a war." The GMB Volunteers, a group described as a "frontline voluntary organization made up of professionals, ethnic and religious groups," has criticised hate advertisements directed against APC candidate General Muhammadu Buhari.

On 9 February, although "Nigerian civil society" was "in uproar" over the postponement, the north east remained calm, and voters there appeared willing to wait.

Groups such as the Nigeria Stability and Reconciliation Programme (NSRP) have "advised political parties to stop making hate speeches against opponents."

The Nigeria Women Platform for Peaceful Election (NWPPE) is collaborating with United Nations Women to hold training sessions for journalists on gender-based violence and gender sensitive reporting. A "women situation room", similar to a "civil society situation room" is planned for monitoring violence against women during the elections.

Senator Abubakar Bukola Saraki, who has called the postponement "an obstruction of democracy", nonetheless released a statement saying "I charge Nigerians to be calm, non-violent and steadfast. We must be determined to make sure postponement does not demoralize or disenfranchise us. We must see this as a challenge for us to remain resolute in yearning for a new democratic government; one that will not see itself as above the people."

On 31 January, a concert was held in Owerri, Imo State, as part of the RSVP concert series, urging young people to RSVP – Register, Select, Vote and Protect. "Register – pick your Permanent Voters' card-PVC, Select (select your candidates), and Vote – vote not Fight, and Protect – protect your mandate." A second RSVP concert was planned for Lagos on 8 February.

The postponement was the topic of a Council on Foreign Relations online conference call with John Campbell on 28 February 2015.

According to the Nigerian Constitution, the presidential election must be held by 28 April. As Section 25 of the 2010 Electoral Act states, the date is to be no later than 30 days before the expiration of the previous office holder's term of office.

=== Media support ===
Buhari was supported by The Economist "with a heavy heart" as "the least awful" option; the newspaper was scathing about the repression and economic policy of Buhari's previous regime, but praised his subsequent adherence to democratic process, anti-corruption stance, and the legitimacy he held in the Muslim North as a stronger platform with which to combat Boko Haram.

=== Voting day ===
The website of the Independent National Electoral Commission was hacked on election day by a group calling itself the Nigerian Cyber Army.

=== Extension ===
Voting was extended due to technical problems with electronic card readers. The technology was introduced to prevent voter fraud, but was opposed by President Goodluck Jonathan who called it a "huge national embarrassment" when problems caused a delay. President Jonathan himself failed to be accredited by the card reader, which was shown live on national television.

=== Violence ===
Boko Haram attempted to disrupt the election by attacking voting centres, killing 41 people. An opposition politician, Umaru Ali, was gunned down in one attack.

==== Peace initiatives ====
The Jos Forum Inter-communal Dialogue Process was established to serve as a sustainable and impartial dialogue mechanism to be used by the communities to handle disputes. In 2015, the Jos Peace Dialogue Forum has already served as a platform for various political parties to discuss challenges and commit to peaceful elections in 2015.

President Buhari said that the election was not a do-or-die affair.

=== Observers ===
Election observer missions [EOM] were deployed from the African Union (AU), Commonwealth of Nations, Economic Community of West African States (ECOWAS) and the European Union (EU); and were led by Amos Sawyer, Bakili Muluzi, John Kufuor, and Santiago Fisas respectively.

UN Secretary-General Ban Ki-moon congratulated the citizens and the government for conducting a peaceful and orderly election. The AUEOM concluded that the elections were conducted in a "peaceful atmosphere" and met the "continental and regional principles of democratic elections". ECOWAS EOM said that it met the "criteria of being free and transparent" despite "pockets of incidents and logistical challenges." The Commonwealth EOM described the conduct as "generally peaceful and transparent."

== Opinion polls ==
Poll source	Date	Sample size	Undecided	Buhari APC	Jonathan PDP	Notes
Sahara Reporters	15 October 2014	15,435	N/A	79%	21%	24-hour online poll
Buildup Nigeria	16 October 2014	26,595	2.29%	48.41%	49.3%	The poll was conducted by Reno Omokri, who serves as President Jonathan's Special Assistant on New Media.
Afrobarometer	5–27 December 2014	2,400	11%	42%	42%	Margin of error of +/-2%
Nigerian FM	22 December 2014			54%	48%	
WorldStage Newsonline	27 March 2015	1,886	N/A	35.53%	64.48%	
NigerianEye	20 January 2015	7,043	N/A	72%	25%	The remaining 3% voted for other candidates

== Results ==
=== President ===
Candidate	Running mate	Party	Votes	%
Muhammadu Buhari	Yemi Osinbajo	All Progressives Congress	15,424,921	53.96
Goodluck Jonathan	Namadi Sambo	People's Democratic Party	12,853,162	44.96
Adebayo Ayeni	Anthony Ologbosere	African Peoples Alliance	53,537	0.19
Ganiyu Galadima	Ojengbede Farida	Allied Congress Party of Nigeria	40,311	0.14
Sam Eke	Hassana Hassan	Citizens Popular Party	36,300	0.13
Rufus Salau	Akuchie Cliff	Alliance for Democracy	30,673	0.11
Mani Ahmad	Obianuju Murphy-Uzohue	African Democratic Congress	29,666	0.10
Allagoa Chinedu	Arabamhen Mary	Peoples Party of Nigeria	24,475	0.09
Martin Onovo	Ibrahim Mohammed	National Conscience Party	24,455	0.09
Tunde Anifowose-Kelani	Ishaka Ofemile	Accord Alliance	22,125	0.08
Chekwas Okorie	Bello Umar	United Progressive Party	18,220	0.06
Remi Sonaiya	Seidu Bobboi	KOWA Party	13,076	0.05
Godson Okoye	Haruna Adamu	United Democratic Party	9,208	0.03
Ambrose Albert Owuru	Haruna Shaba	Hope Party	7,435	0.03
Total			28,587,564	100.00
Valid votes			28,587,564	97.13
Invalid/blank votes			844,519	2.87
Total votes			29,432,083	100.00
Registered voters/turnout			67,422,005	43.65
Source: INEC

==== By state ====
State	Buhari	Jonathan	Ayeni	Galadima	Eke	Salau	Ahmad	Chinedu	Onovo	Kelani	Okorie	Sonaiya	Okoye	Owuru
Abia	13,394	368,303	2,766	2,194	1,046	448	569	424	745	315	330	173	213	125
Adamawa	374,701	251,664	1,549	1,166	819	595	1,012	1,163	1,212	495	334	752	289	267
Akwa Ibom	58,411	953,304	384	443	412	474	608	327	381	1,600	144	160	224	192
Anambra	17,926	660,762	2,303	1,259	1,279	475	534	537	887	547	1,121	311	286	357
Bauchi	931,598	86,085	964	232	391	173	189	128	207	131	37	128	29	46
Bayelsa	5,194	361,209	70	38	44	69	116	62	95	45	35	52	20	18
Benue	373,961	303,737	945	1,464	567	254	539	439	683	315	74	105	66	115
Borno	473,543	25,640	878	243	310	392	201	143	107	145	41	158	31	88
Cross River	28,368	414,863	532	514	381	709	749	864	930	279	1,487	312	289	237
Delta	48,910	1,211,405	478	916	813	735	888	393	670	1,473	261	311	354	166
Ebonyi	19,518	323,653	2,452	1,214	2,345	1,133	2,704	1,168	1,890	426	4,859	913	624	989
Edo	208,469	286,869	709	1,284	325	450	512	729	516	159	72	175	160	22
Ekiti	120,331	176,466	482	538	330	854	424	388	377	94	145	108	60	94
Enugu	14,157	553,003	715	479	237	269	478	407	761	441	290	203	1,623	110
Gombe	361,245	96,873	773	192	407	169	247	157	227	104	37	97	25	46
Imo	133,253	559,185	2,236	956	733	757	1,617	414	784	533	1,917	158	264	157
Jigawa	885,988	142,904	2,527	540	1,553	587	375	853	548	394	197	423	338	337
Kaduna	1,127,760	484,085	1,611	424	824	273	546	549	754	218	78	176	79	105
Kano	1,903,999	215,779	2,770	778	1,552	708	657	485	697	426	156	288	234	292
Katsina	1,345,441	98,937	1,671	402	976	283	498	254	330	183	72	215	117	47
Kebbi	567,883	100,972	2,685	361	1,794	450	472	547	519	214	238	448	207	213
Kogi	264,851	149,987	1,001	1,089	967	427	761	476	399	700	156	190	180	144
Kwara	302,146	132,602	1,165	817	910	520	438	325	394	248	102	214	81	118
Lagos	792,460	632,327	2,177	3,038	1,125	4,453	2,072	1,041	1,430	1,795	244	1,000	269	255
Nasarawa	236,838	273,460	310	95	131	74	105	164	222	40	33	48	23	4
Niger	657,678	149,222	2,006	441	1,264	403	614	449	550	307	118	305	116	198
Ogun	308,290	207,950	1,930	3,072	978	1,927	1,364	4,339	815	584	597	432	562	332
Ondo	299,889	251,368	1,139	2,406	1,012	1,237	1,227	734	846	386	221	223	184	184
Osun	383,603	249,929	1,306	1,731	1,029	1,667	937	599	767	377	159	255	124	132
Oyo	528,620	303,376	4,468	8,979	6,674	6,282	5,000	2,842	1,895	6,331	3,665	1,312	1,069	839
Plateau	429,140	549,615	618	391	237	279	406	554	693	178	29	138	54	56
Rivers	69,238	1,487,075	513	525	577	1,104	1,031	492	565	1,066	156	2,274	303	542
Sokoto	671,926	152,199	3,482	535	1,894	714	762	605	686	249	180	475	269	283
Taraba	261,326	310,800	1,306	811	1,033	586	320	680	876	962	439	153	224	161
Yobe	446,265	25,526	632	164	329	213	112	101	120	101	32	104	30	67
Zamfara	612,202	144,833	1,310	238	655	290	294	374	404	125	68	122	93	14
FCT	146,399	157,195	674	342	347	240	288	269	473	139	96	165	95	83
Total	15,424,921	12,853,162	53,537	40,311	36,300	30,673	29,666	24,475	24,455	22,125	18,220	13,076	9,208	7,435
Source: INEC

=== Senate ===
Party	Votes	%	Seats	+/–
All Progressives Congress			60	+28
People's Democratic Party			48	–23
Vacant			1	–
Total			109	0
Total votes	29,432,083	–		
Registered voters/turnout	67,422,005	43.65		
Source: IPU

=== House of Representatives ===
Party	Votes	%	Seats	+/–
All Progressives Congress			212	+77
People's Democratic Party			140	–63
All Progressives Grand Alliance			5	–2
Accord			1	–4
Labour Party			1	–7
Social Democratic Party			1	0
Total			360	0
Total votes	29,432,083	–		
Registered voters/turnout	67,422,005	43.65		
Source: IPU
