= Democratic Alternative =

Democratic Alternative can refer to:

- Democratic Alternative (Finland)
- Democratic Alternative (Macedonia)
- Democratic Alternative (Malta)
- Democratic Alternative (Suriname)
- Democratic Alternative (Colombia)
- Democratic Alternative (Serbia)
- Democratic Alternative (Nigeria)
