= 2015 Nasarawa State gubernatorial election =

2015 gubernatorial election in Nasarawa State, Nigeria

- April 11, 2015
	APC	APGA	PDP
Nominee	Umaru Tanko Al-Makura	Labaran Maku	Yusuf Agabi
Party	APC	APGA	PDP
Running mate	Silas Ali Agara	Abua Alhaji Ibrahim
Popular vote	309,746	178,983	119,782
Percentage	50.90%	29.41%	19.68%
Governor before election
Umaru Tanko Al-Makura
APC
Elected Governor
Umaru Tanko Al-Makura
APC

The 2015 Nasarawa State gubernatorial election occurred in Nigeria on April 11, 2015, the APC nominee Umaru Tanko Al-Makura won his re-election bid, defeating Labaran Maku of the APGA.

Umaru Tanko Al-Makura emerged APC gubernatorial candidate after defeating 2 other candidates who are Reuben Audu and James Angbazo. He picked Silas Ali Agara as his running mate. Labaran Maku was the APGA candidate with Abua Alhaji Ibrahim as his running mate. 8 candidates contested in the election.

== Electoral system ==
The Governor of Nasarawa State is elected using the plurality voting system.

== Primary election ==
=== APC primary ===
The APC primary election was held on December 6, 2014. Umaru Tanko Al-Makura won the primary election after defeating 2 other candidates, Reuben Audu and James Angbazo.

=== APGA primary ===
Labaran Maku was granted waiver by the APGA therefore, emerged the party's flag bearer. Maku's name was sent to INEC as a substitute for Matthew Ombugaku who earlier emerged the governorship candidate in the primary election.

== Results ==
A total number of 8 candidates registered with the Independent National Electoral Commission to contest in the election.

The total number of 623,279 votes were cast and 771 votes were rejected.

Candidate	Party	Votes	%
Umaru Tanko Al-Makura	All Progressives Congress	309,746	50.90
Labaran Maku	All Progressives Grand Alliance	178,983	29.41
Yusuf Agabi	People's Democratic Party	119,782	19.68
Total		608,511	100.00
Valid votes		608,511	99.87
Invalid/blank votes		771	0.13
Total votes		609,282	100.00
Source: Premium Times
