= Remi Sonaiya =

Nigerian politician, educationist and writer (born 1955)

- Born: March 2, 1955 (age 71); Ibadan, Oyo state, Nigeria
- Education: University of Ife; Cornell University
- Occupations: politician; writer; educationist
- Years active: 1984–present
- Political party: KOWA
- Spouse: Babafunso Sonaiya
- Children: 2
- Website: web.archive.org/web/20150111004003/http://www.remisonaiya.com/ (archived)

Oluremi Comfort Sonaiya (born March 2, 1955) is a Nigerian politician, educationalist and writer. She was Nigeria's only female presidential candidate in the 2015 general election under the platform of the KOWA Party. But recently lost her bid to Dr. Adesina Fagbenro Byron in representing the party again in 2019 election.

== Early life and education ==
Sonaiya was born in Ibadan, the capital of Oyo State, where she completed her primary and secondary school education at St. Luke's Demonstration School, Ibadan and St. Anne's School, Ibadan. In 1977, she graduated from the University of Ife (now Obafemi Awolowo University), where she studied French.

She later obtained a Master of Arts degree in French Literature from Cornell University in the United States, and another master's degree in linguistics from a university in Nigeria in 1984. She returned to Cornell in 1988 to pursue a PhD programme in Linguistics.

== Career ==
In 1982, she was employed as an Assistant Lecturer in the Department of Foreign Languages, Obafemi Awolowo University before she rose to the position of Professor of French Language and Applied Linguistics in 2004. She is a fellow of the Alexander von Humboldt Foundation where she went on to be appointed the body's Ambassador Scientist from 2008 to 2014.

In 2010, she retired from her position at Obafemi Awolowo University and became politically active, joining the KOWA Party where she was voted its National Public Relations Officer, and went on to be the party's candidate for the 2015 Presidential election. At the election, Sonaiya received 13,076 votes and finished in 12th place.

== Publications ==
Sonaiya is a columnist for The Niche, a Nigerian online newspaper, Sonaiya has published several books including:

- Culture and Identity on Stage: Social-political Concerns and Enactments in Contemporary African Performing Arts (2001) ISBN 9789782015785
- Language Matters: Exploring the Dimensions of Multilingualism (2007)
- A Trust to Earn – Reflections on Life and Leadership in Nigeria (2010) ISBN 9789789115983
- Igniting Consciousness – Nigeria and Other Riddles (2013) ISBN 9785108473
- Daybreak Nigeria – This Nation Must Rise! (2014) ISBN 9789785205732

== Personal life ==
She is married to Babafunso Sonaiya, a professor of animal science, and they have one son, one daughter and grandchild.
