= 2015 Bauchi State gubernatorial election =

Gubernatorial election in Bauchi State

- 11 April 2015
Nominee	Mohammed Abdullahi Abubakar	Mohammed Jatau
Party	APC	PDP
Popular vote	654,934	282,650
Governor before election
Isa Yuguda
PDP
Elected Governor
Mohammed Abdullahi Abubakar
APC

The 2015 Bauchi State gubernatorial election was the 8th gubernatorial election of Bauchi State. Held on 11 April 2015, the All Progressives Congress nominee Mohammed Abdullahi Abubakar won the election, defeating Mohammed Jatau of the People's Democratic Party.

== APC primary ==
APC candidate Mohammed Abdullahi Abubakar defeated 7 other contestants to clinch the party ticket. He won with 930 votes to defeat his closest rival and the former Minister of Police Affairs, Ibrahim Lame, who received 806 votes. Yusuf Tuggar received 526 votes, Sadiq Mohammed received 194 votes, Ibrahim Zailani, former member of the House of Representatives received 161 votes, Abdullahi Tanko received 92 votes, Nuhu Gidado received 86 votes, Mohammed Umar received 56 votes. Accredited voters was 2,901, vote cast was 2,865 and invalid votes was 30. After the primaries, Ibrahim Lame accused the officials of the All Progressives Congress in Bauchi State of electoral malpractice that denied him a chance to win the governorship ticket. The former Minister of Police Affairs in Nigeria called for the cancellation of the primaries and asked for a rerun, saying he would proceed to court if the election is not cancelled.

=== Candidates ===
- Mohammed Abdullahi Abubakar
- Ibrahim Lame
- Yusuf Tuggar
- Sadiq Mohammed
- Ibrahim Zailani
- Abdullahi Tanko
- Nuhu Gidado
- Mohammed Umar

== PDP primary ==
PDP candidate Mohammed Jatau defeated 4 other contestants to clinch the party ticket. He won with 368 votes to defeat his closest rival, a former Senator in the state, Babayo Garba Gamawa, who received 116 votes. Muhammad Ali Pate, former Minister of State for Health received 86 votes, Adamu Gumba received 20 votes, Bappa Azare received 3 votes. 842 delegates were accredited for the election, while nine votes was invalid. A former Secretary to the Government of the Federation, Yayale Ahmed, withdrew as an aspirant a day before the election. The immediate past Secretary to the Bauchi State Government, Aminu Hammayo also withdrew from the election. After the election, Muhammad Ali Pate said that no primary election took place in the state, calling on the national headquarters of PDP to cancel the election and conduct a fresh one for fairness and good democratic practice. Adamu Gumba described the election as a sham.

=== Candidates ===
- Mohammed Jatau
- Babayo Garba Gamawa
- Muhammad Ali Pate
- Adamu Gumba
- Bappa Azare

== Other governorship aspirant and party ==
- Muktari Haladu, AD
- Bello Ibrahim, APGA
- Salisu Musa, UPN
- Abdullahi Adamu Usman, KP
- Danladi Musa, MPPP
- Mato Musa, UPP
- Bala Musa, PDC
- Musa Yakubu Wanka, ACPN

== Results ==
A total of 10 candidates contested in the election. Mohammed Abdullahi Abubakar from the APC won the election, defeating Mohammed Jatau from the PDP.

2015 Bauchi State gubernatorial election
Party	Candidate	Votes	%	±%
APC	Mohammed Abdullahi Abubakar	654,934		
PDP	Mohammed Jatau	282,650		
APC hold				
