= Adesina Fagbenro =

Nigerian politician

Adesina Ayodele Fagbenro Byron

Personal details
- Born: June 5, 1959 (age 67)
- Party: KOWA party
- Education: Government College, Ibadan; University of Ibadan
- Occupation: Politician, lawyer, afro-jazz musician
- Website: sinafagbenro.com
- Nickname: SFB

Adesina Ayodele Fagbenro-Byron (popularly known as SFB; born June 5, 1959), is a former governance adviser with the United Kingdom's Department for International Development (DFID), co-founder of the KOWA party in July 2009, a lawyer, an Afro-jazz musician better known as "Byron" and a presidential candidate for the KOWA Party.

== Early life and education ==
SFB was born on June 5, 1959, in UCH Ibadan to barrister Samuel Adekunle Fagbenro and his wife Victoria Modupe Oke. He is an alumnus of Mary Hill Convent's Primary School in Ibadan, Ibadan College 1970–1974 and the Federal Government College 1975–77, Ilorin. He has a BSc (Economics), LL.B (Bachelor of Laws), M.Inf.Sc (Master's Information Science) from the University of Ibadan, Oyo State, Nigeria. He was called to the bar at the Nigerian Law School, Lagos in 1989.

== Career ==
SFB worked for 10 years with the United Kingdom Government's Department for International Development (DFID) but retired in September 2015; he served as governance adviser in the delivery of several federal level governance programs, regional coordinator for South West and South East Nigeria as well as Head of Office, for Lagos and Enugu respectively.

He has also served as resource person to past and present governments especially in structuring development support and technical assistance to state and non-state actors.

Fagbenro is an Afro-jazz musician and a stage performer. He has published works, including the acclaimed peace song "Alafia", and performed live under the name "Byron".

He is chief responsibility officer of Mothergold Ltd, founder of Sina Fagbenro & Associates in 1990, initiator of the Partnerships for Development (P4D) and co-founder and chairman of the Victoria Modupe Oke Foundation.

== Politics ==
SFB contested for the local government Chairmanship Election in the Eti Osa Local Government Area of Lagos State, on the platform of the People's Democratic Party (PDP) in 2001 but later withdrew.

In July 2009, he joined the KOWA party as founding member with others including Chinua Azuzu, Fola Adeola, Ngozi iwere, Muktar Bakare, Remi Sonaiya, Mark Adebayo, the current general secretary and Saidu Bobboi, national chairman.

== Personal life ==
He is married to Lolade and has 5 children, 4 boys and 1 daughter her name is moyosoreoluwa.
