= 2019 Akwa Ibom State gubernatorial election =

2019 gubernatorial election in Akwa Ibom State, Nigeria

- March 9, 2019
Nominee	Udom Gabriel Emmanuel	Nsima Ekere
Party	PDP	APC
Running mate	Moses Ekpo	Amadu Jackson Attai
Popular vote	519,712	171,978
Governor before election
Udom Gabriel Emmanuel
PDP
Elected Governor
Udom Gabriel Emmanuel
PDP

The 2019 Akwa Ibom State gubernatorial election was held on 9 March 2019. Incumbent PDP Governor Udom Gabriel Emmanuel was re-elected for a second term, defeating Nsima Ekere of the APC. The Independent National Electoral Commission declared Emmanuel the winner on 10 March 2019.

Emmanuel was returned unopposed as the PDP's gubernatorial candidate and retained Moses Ekpo as his running mate. Ekere won the APC primary and selected Amadu Atai as his running mate. Forty-five candidates were registered for the election.

== Electoral system ==
The Governor of Akwa Ibom State is elected using the plurality voting system.

== Primary election ==
=== PDP primary ===
Udom Gabriel Emmanuel won the primary election after he was returned as the sole candidate. He picked Amadu Jackson Attai as his running mate.

=== APC primary ===
The APC primary election was held on September 30, 2018. Nsima Ekere won the primary election polling 160,458 votes against 3 other candidates. His closest rival was Dan Abia who came second with 4,189 votes, Akpanudoedehe came third with 2,015 votes, while Edet Efretuei had 1,234 votes.

== Legal challenges ==
Following the election, Nsima Ekere and the All Progressives Congress challenged the declaration of Udom Gabriel Emmanuel as the winner.

=== Election petition tribunal ===
The Governorship Election Petition Tribunal sitting in Uyo dismissed the petition filed by Ekere and the APC on 19 September 2019 and upheld Emmanuel's election. The tribunal held that the petitioners had failed to establish their allegations of non-compliance with the electoral law and irregularities sufficient to invalidate the election.

=== Court of Appeal ===
Ekere and the APC appealed the tribunal's decision. On 13 November 2019, the Court of Appeal sitting in Calabar upheld Emmanuel's election and dismissed the appeal. The court also awarded ₦500,000 in costs against Ekere.

=== Supreme Court ===
Ekere subsequently appealed to the Supreme Court, seeking the nullification of the election and a fresh election. In December 2019, the Supreme Court upheld Emmanuel's election and dismissed the appeal.

== Results ==
A total number of 45 candidates registered with the Independent National Electoral Commission to contest in the election.

The total number of registered voters in the state was 2,119,727, while 720,064 voters were accredited. Total number of votes cast was 712,037, while number of valid votes was 696,245. Rejected votes were 15,792.

Candidate	Party	Votes	%
Udom Gabriel Emmanuel	People's Democratic Party	519,712	74.64
Nsima Ekere	All Progressives Congress	171,978	24.70
Other candidates		4,555	0.65
Total		696,245	100.00
Valid votes		696,245	97.78
Invalid/blank votes		15,792	2.22
Total votes		712,037	100.00
Registered voters/turnout		2,119,727	33.59
Source: Leadership

=== By local government area ===
Here are the results of the election by local government area for the two major parties. The total valid votes of 696,245 represents the 45 political parties that participated in the election. Green represents LGAs won by Udom Gabriel Emmanuel. Blue represents LGAs won by Nsima Ekere.

LGA	Udom Gabriel Emmanuel PDP		Nsima Ekere APC		Total votes
LGA	#	%	#	%	#
Esit Eket	13,406		3,917		
Ibeno	10,008		1,442		
Urue-Offong/Oruko	6,915		4,592		
Okobo, Akwa Ibom	10,800		6,079		
Nsit-Ubium	17,863		6,004		
Onna	32,103		2,110		
Uruan	12,895		5,192		
Nsit-Atai	8,855		3,783		
Ikot-Abasi	9,335		7,549		
Obot-Akara	13,979		4,704		
Uyo	35,092		12, 549		
Abak	17,461		11,505		
Ini, Akwa Ibom	17,335		3,316		
Nsit-Ibom	17,326		4,816		
Mbo, Akwa Ibom	9,631		5,419		
Eket	26,372		5,087		
Oruk Anam	35,093		8,640		
Itu, Akwa Ibom	14,633		5,911		
Ukanafun	35,447		7,220		
Etinan	22,954		8,089		
Ibesikpo Asutan	15,679		11,216		
Udung-Uko	4,036		2,108		
Mkpat-Enin	18,056		4,769		
Ika, Akwa Ibom	12,752		3,212		
Oron, Akwa Ibom	8,433		3,859		
Ibiono-Ibom	36,988		7,280		
Ikot Ekpene	14,832		11,240		
Etim Ekpo	10,149		2,776		
Eastern Obolo	10,780		1,914		
Ikono	18,910		4,498		
Essien Udim	2,161		6,938		
Totals	519,712		171,978		696,245
