= Moses Shipi =

Nigerian businessman and politician

Moses Godia Shipi
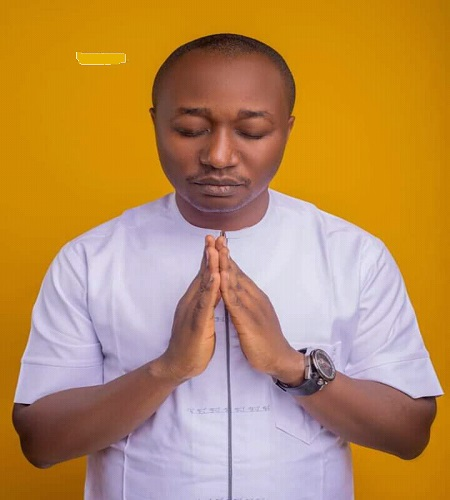

National Chairman of the All Blending Party
- Incumbent
- Assumed office 2017

Personal details
- Born: March 2, 1979 (age 47)
- Party: All Blending Party
- Spouse: Angela Bulus Godia Shipi

Moses Godia Shipi (born March 2, 1979) is a Nigerian businessman and politician. He served as a personal assistant to the former governor of Bauchi state Alh. (Dr). Malam Isa Yuguda. He got elected to serve as the national chairman of the All Blending Party (ABP) and former presidential candidate among the 79 candidate that contested to be the president of Nigeria in the 2019 Nigerian general election.

== Early life ==
Moses Godia Shipi was born on March 2, 1979, in Boi village, Bogoro Local Government Area of Bauchi State, Nigeria. His father is Moses Dawaki Shipi. His early childhood education came at Boi Central Primary School, Bogoro LGA, Bauchi State and Gonerit Memorial College Tuwan Kabwir, Kanke LGA of Plateau State. He has a bachelor's degree in Quantity Surveying from Abubakar Tafawa Balewa University.

== Career ==
Moses was a member of the People's Democratic Party (PDP). From 2007 to 2010 he served as personal assistant to Alh. (Dr). Malam Isa Yuguda before the 2017 formation of the All Blending Party (ABP). At age 40 he was elected the national chairman of ABP, which made him the youngest among 91 approved political party national chairmen in Nigeria. He was a presidential candidate of the All Blending Party.

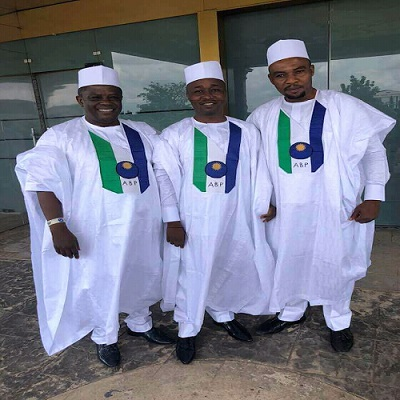
Shipi at Party Convention

He is the chief executive officer (CEO) of La Shipson Construction Nigeria Limited, La Shipson Oil & Gas Nigeria Limited and La Shipson Shipping Company Nigeria Limited, la Shipson Hotel & Suits, la Shipson Travels and Tours, Moses Godia Shipi Foundation.

== Personal life ==
He is married to Angela Bulus Godia Shipi and they have two children, Queenkyra Moses shipi and King-Kendrick Moses shipi.
