= 2015 Cross River State gubernatorial election =

State election in Nigeria

- April 11, 2015
Nominee	Benedict Ayade	Odey Ochicha
Party	PDP	APC
Popular vote	342,016	53,983
Governor before election
Liyel Imoke
PDP
Elected Governor
Benedict Ayade
PDP

The 2015 Cross River State gubernatorial election was the 9th gubernatorial election of Cross River State. Held on April 11, 2015, the People's Democratic Party nominee Benedict Ayade won the election, defeating Odey Ochicha of the All Progressives Congress.

== People's Democratic Party primary ==
In the leadup to the election, 10 candidates declared their intent to seek the nomination of the People's Democratic Party (PDP). These were Legor Idagbo, former Commissioner for Works, Mike Aniah, former Secretary to the State Government, Larry Odey, Speaker of the Cross River State House of Assembly, Ntufam Fidelis Ugbo, former Executive Secretary of the National Planning Commission, Goddy Jedy Agba, former Group General Manager of the Nigerian National Petroleum Corporation, Emmanuel Ibeshi, former National Publicity Secretary of the PDP, Senator Benedict Ayade Rev. Francis Eworo, Dr. Peter Oti, and Joe Agi.

Prior to the vote, Aniah, Odey, Ugbo, and Idagbo dropped out, endorsing Ayade, who then won in a landslide, with 752 of 782 votes. Following his defeat, Agi, the second-place finisher, sued Ayade, claiming Ayade had misstated his age and was not a bona fide member of the party, therefore rendering his election victory invalid. The Federal High Court, the Appeal Court, and finally the Supreme Court ruled against Agi, holding that Ayade was validly nominated by the PDP.

=== Candidates ===
- Benedict Ayade
- Joe Agi
- Goddy Jedy Agba
- Francis Eworo
- Emmanuel Ibeshi
- Peter Oti

== All Progressives Congress primary ==
In the All Progressives Congress primary, Odey Ochicha defeated 2 other candidates to clinch the party ticket, winning with 1,177 votes to defeat his closest rival Lazarus Undie, who received 168 votes, and Mike Ogar, who received 40 votes.

=== Candidates ===
- Odey Ochicha
- Lazarus Undie
- Mike Ogar

== Other candidates ==
- Henrietta Henry, NNPP
- Ntufam Fidelis Ugbo, LP
- Okwa Philip Ogbo, ID

== Results ==
A total of 5 candidates contested in the election. Benedict Ayade from the PDP won the election, defeating Odey Ochicha from the APC.

2015 Cross River State gubernatorial election
Party	Candidate	Votes	%	±%
PDP	Benedict Ayade	342,016		
APC	Odey Ochicha	53,983		
PDP hold				

== Aftermath ==
After the election, Ntufam Fidelis Ugbo from the LP challenged the outcome of the election at the Cross River State Governorship Elections Petitions Tribunal. The LP candidate told the tribunal to nullify the governorship election, stating that it was marred by irregularities. On the day of the judgement, Ntufam Fidelis Ugbo told the tribunal that he is withdrawing the case against the PDP and the winner of the election, Benedict Ayade and so it should be struck out. The court in its ruling said the case lacked merit and substance and dismissed the petition.
