= Jimoh Olaifa =

Nigerian politician

Federal Representative
- Succeeded by: Gboyega Nasir Isiaka
- Constituency: Egbado North/Imeko Afon

Personal details
- Occupation: Politician

Jimoh Olaifa Aremu is a Nigerian politician. He was a member of the House of Representatives representing Egbado North/Imeko Afon federal constituency of Ogun state in the 9th National assembly. He was succeeded by Gboyega Nasir Isiaka.
