= 2011 Kwara State gubernatorial election =

State election in Nigeria

- 26 April 2011
Nominee	Abdulfatah Ahmed	Dele Belgore
Party	PDP	ACN
Popular vote	254,969	152,580
Governor before election
Bukola Saraki
PDP
Elected Governor
Abdulfatah Ahmed
PDP

The 2011 Kwara State gubernatorial election was the 7th gubernatorial election of Kwara State. Held on 26 April 2011, the People's Democratic Party nominee Abdulfatah Ahmed won the election, defeating Dele Belgore of the Action Congress of Nigeria.

== Results ==
A total of 15 candidates contested in the election. Abdulfatah Ahmed from the People's Democratic Party won the election, defeating Dele Belgore from the Action Congress of Nigeria. Valid votes was 504,102.

2011 Kwara State gubernatorial election
Party	Candidate	Votes	%	±%
PDP	Abdulfatah Ahmed	254,969	50.58	
ACN	Dele Belgore	152,580	30.27	
PDP hold				
