= Alliance for New Nigeria =

Political party in Nigeria

Alliance for New Nigeria (ANN)
- Abbreviation: ANN
- National chairman: Emmanuel Dania
- Founded: March 2017
- Headquarters: 20, Durban Street, Wuse 11, Abuja.
- Membership: 50,000
- Ideology: Technocracy
- Slogan: A New Nigeria

Website
- http://anewnigeria.com/

Alliance for New Nigeria (ANN) is a political party in Nigeria. It was founded in March, 2017 by some politically concerned Nigerians. The current National Chairman of the party is Mr. Emmanuel Dania. The party got officially registered and announced by the Independent National Electoral Commission (INEC) as a full fledged political party on January 10, 2018.
