= 2011 Gombe State gubernatorial election =

- April 26, 2011
Nominee	Ibrahim Hassan Dankwambo	Abubakar Aliyu
Party	PDP	CPC
Popular vote	596,481	91,781
Governor before election
Mohammed Danjuma Goje
PDP
Elected Governor
Ibrahim Hassan Dankwambo
PDP

The 2011 Gombe State gubernatorial election was the fourth gubernatorial election of Gombe State, Nigeria. Held on April 26, 2011, the People's Democratic Party nominee Ibrahim Hassan Dankwambo won the election, defeating Abubakar Aliyu of the Congress for Progressive Change.

== Results ==
A total of 6 candidates contested in the election. Ibrahim Hassan Dankwambo from the People's Democratic Party won the election, defeating Abubakar Aliyu from the Congress for Progressive Change. Valid votes was 780,393, votes cast was 801,747, 21,354 votes was cancelled.

2011 Gombe State gubernatorial election
Party	Candidate	Votes	%	±%
PDP	Ibrahim Hassan Dankwambo	596,481		
CPC	Abubakar Aliyu	91,781		
PDP hold				
