= Movement of the People =

Political movement in Nigeria

- Abbreviation: MOP
- Leader: Seun Anikulapo-Kuti
- Founder: Fela Kuti
- Founded: 1979
- Headquarters: Allen 100271, Ikeja
- Ideology: Pan-Africanism; African socialism Nkrumaism; Scientific socialism
- Political position: Left-wing
- Slogan: Liberation Generation

Website
- www.mopnigeria.org

The Movement of the People, commonly abbreviated as MOP or M.O.P, is a Nigerian left-wing pan-African political movement. The organisation was originally formed by Fela Anikulapo Kuti in 1979 as a political party but quickly became inactive due to Fela's confrontations with the government at the time. It has since been revived by Fela's youngest son, Seun Kuti in the wake of the Nigerian End SARS protests of October 2020.

== History ==
In 1979, Fela Kuti formed a political movement, which he called Movement of the People (MOP), to "clean up society like a mop". MOP preached Nkrumahism and Africanism. In 1979, he nominated himself for president in Nigeria's first elections in decades, but his candidature was refused. Subsequently, Fela stopped engaging in political activities and the party became inactive.

In November 2020, Seun Kuti announced the revival of the organisation and the intention to re-register it as a political party. He said that the organisation was being re-established to serve as an opposition to the country’s elites. During a live press conference, Seun explained that the Movement of the People (MOP) was a coalition of socialist and progressive organisations. In January 2021, Seun informed the press that a formal request had been sent to INEC to register the movement as a political party.
