= 2011 Nasarawa State gubernatorial election =

Nigerian state election

- 26 April 2011
Nominee	Umaru Tanko Al-Makura	Aliyu Doma
Party	CPC	PDP
Popular vote	324,823	320,398
Governor before election
Aliyu Doma
PDP
Elected Governor
Umaru Tanko Al-Makura
CPC

The 2011 Nasarawa State gubernatorial election was the fourth gubernatorial election of Nasarawa State. Held on 26 April 2011, the Congress for Progressive Change nominee Umaru Tanko Al-Makura won the election, defeating Aliyu Doma of the People's Democratic Party.

== Results ==
A total of 9 candidates contested in the election. Umaru Tanko Al-Makura from the Congress for Progressive Change won the election, defeating Aliyu Doma from the People's Democratic Party. Valid votes was 674,014.

2011 Nasarawa State gubernatorial election
Party	Candidate	Votes	%	±%
CPC	Umaru Tanko Al-Makura	324,823		
PDP	Aliyu Doma	320,398		
CPC hold				
