= Gboyega Nasir Isiaka =

Nigerian politician

Federal Representative
- Preceded by: Jimoh Olaifa
- Constituency: Yewa North/Imeko-Afon

Personal details
- Occupation: Politician

Gboyega Nasir Isiaka is a Nigerian politician and a member of the Nigerian House of Representatives. He represents the Yewa North/Imeko-Afon Federal Constituency in Ogun State.
