= 2011 Yobe State gubernatorial election =

State election in Nigeria

- 26 April 2011
Nominee	Ibrahim Gaidam	Usman Albishir
Party	ANPP	PDP
Popular vote	436,998	195,449
Governor before election
Mamman Bello Ali
ANPP
Elected Governor
Ibrahim Gaidam
ANPP

The 2011 Yobe State gubernatorial election was the 5th gubernatorial election of Yobe State. Held on 26 April 2011, the All Nigeria Peoples Party nominee Ibrahim Gaidam won the election, defeating Usman Albishir of the People's Democratic Party.

== Results ==
A total of 6 candidates contested in the election. Ibrahim Gaidam from the All Nigeria Peoples Party won the election, defeating Usman Albishir from the People's Democratic Party. Valid votes was 656,128.

2011 Yobe State gubernatorial election
Party	Candidate	Votes	%	±%
ANPP	Ibrahim Gaidam	436,998		
PDP	Usman Albishir	195,449		
ANPP hold				
