= 2015 Katsina State gubernatorial election =

State election in Nigeria

- 11 April 2015
Nominee	Aminu Bello Masari	Musa Nashuni
Party	APC	PDP
Popular vote	943,085	476,768
Governor before election
Ibrahim Shema
PDP
Elected Governor
Aminu Bello Masari
APC

The 2015 Katsina State gubernatorial election was the 6th gubernatorial election of Katsina State. Held on 11 April 2015, the All Progressives Congress nominee Aminu Bello Masari won the election, defeating Musa Nashuni of the People's Democratic Party.

== APC primary ==
APC candidate, Aminu Bello Masari clinched the party ticket. The APC primary election was held in 2014.

== PDP primary ==
PDP candidate, Musa Nashuni clinched the party ticket. The PDP primary election was held in 2014.

== Results ==
A total of 7 candidates contested in the election. Aminu Bello Masari from the All Progressives Congress won the election, defeating Musa Nashuni from the People's Democratic Party.

2015 Katsina State gubernatorial election
Party	Candidate	Votes	%	±%
APC	Aminu Bello Masari	943,085		
PDP	Musa Nashuni	476,768		
APC hold				
