= Labaran Maku =

Nigerian politician

Minister of Information
- In office December 2010 – January 2015
- Preceded by: Dora Akunyili
- Succeeded by: Patricia Akwashiki

Deputy Governor of Nasarawa State
- In office 29 May 2003 – 29 May 2007
- Preceded by: Prof Onje Gewado
- Succeeded by: John Micheal Abdul

Personal details
- Born: 1 January 1962 (age 64) Wakama, Nasarawa State, Nigeria
- Party: All Progressives Grand Alliance (APGA)
- Website: Official Website

Labaran Maku (born 1 January 1962) is a Nigerian politician who served as Minister of Information from 2010 to 2015 and as deputy governor of Nasarawa State from 2003 to 2007.

== Early life ==
Maku was born on 1 January 1962 in Wakama District, Nassarawa Eggon Local Government Area of Nassarawa State.

== Education ==
Maku attended St. Michael's Primary School, Aloce, between 1970 and 1976; Zawan Teacher's College, Bukuru-Jos, Plateau State, from 1976 to 1981; and the University of Jos, Plateau State, from 1983 to 1987. He took to politics and leadership early in life and held the position of president of the University of Jos Students Union and public relations officer of the National Association of Nigerian Students (NANS) while in school.

He holds a bachelor's degree in history and education and has attended numerous training programmes, international conferences, presidential retreats and seminars. He has presented papers at international conferences, was a guest speaker at several leadership fora and has written extensively on Nigerian education and social inequality and on Nigerian political and economic problems. He worked with USAID from 1997 to 1999. He worked as a reporter, a political editor, a member of the editorial board of two national newspapers and a deputy editor-in-chief during his career as a journalist. He also worked as a school teacher and headmaster at government-owned schools from 1981 to 1983.

== Political career ==
Maku served as the deputy governor of Nasarawa State from 2003 to 2007, where he assumed leadership responsibilities of governing state agencies and institutions. Prior to that, he was the Commissioner for Information, Youth and Sports from 1999 to 2002 and the Commissioner for Information and Internal Affairs from 2002 to 2003. He was the spokesperson of the state and a key actor in the formulation of state policies.

In June 2010, Maku was appointed Minister of State for Information and Communications and subsequently became the substantive Minister of Information and Communications in December 2010. He resigned on 20 October 2014 to pursue his ambition of contesting the 2015 Nasarawa State gubernatorial election.
