= 2011 Imo State gubernatorial election =

State election in Nigeria

- 26 April 2011
Nominee	Rochas Okorocha	Ikedi Ohakim
Party	APGA	PDP
Popular vote	336,859	290,496
Governor before election
Ikedi Ohakim
PDP
Elected Governor
Rochas Okorocha
APGA

The 2011 Imo State gubernatorial election was the seventh gubernatorial election of Imo State, Nigeria. Held on 26 April 2011, the All Progressives Grand Alliance nominee Rochas Okorocha won the election, defeating Ikedi Ohakim of the People's Democratic Party.

== Results ==
A total of 19 candidates contested in the election. Rochas Okorocha from the All Progressives Grand Alliance won the election, defeating Ikedi Ohakim from the People's Democratic Party. Valid votes was 750,964.

2011 Imo State gubernatorial election
Party	Candidate	Votes	%	±%
APGA	Rochas Okorocha	336,859		
PDP	Ikedi Ohakim	290,496		
APGA hold				
