= 2015 Sokoto State gubernatorial election =

State election in Nigeria

- April 11, 2015
Nominee	Aminu Tambuwal	Abdallah Wali
Party	APC	PDP
Popular vote	647,609	269,074
Governor before election
Aliyu Magatakarda Wamakko
PDP
Elected Governor
Aminu Tambuwal
APC

The 2015 Sokoto State gubernatorial election was the 8th gubernatorial election of Sokoto State. Held on April 11, 2015, the All Progressives Congress nominee Aminu Tambuwal won the election, defeating Abdallah Wali of the People's Democratic Party.

== APC primary ==
APC candidate, Aminu Tambuwal clinched the party ticket. The APC primary election was held in 2014.

== PDP primary ==
PDP candidate, Abdallah Wali clinched the party ticket. The PDP primary election was held in 2014.

== Results ==
A total of 21 candidates contested in the election. Aminu Tambuwal from the All Progressives Congress won the election, defeating Abdallah Wali from the People's Democratic Party. 32,054 votes was cancelled, valid votes was 926,682, votes cast was 958,736. The winner, Aminu Tambuwal won in all the 23 Local Government Areas in the State.

2015 Sokoto State gubernatorial election
Party	Candidate	Votes	%	±%
APC	Aminu Tambuwal	647,609		
PDP	Abdallah Wali	269,074		
APC hold				
