= 2019 Bauchi State gubernatorial election =

State election in Nigeria

The Bauchi 2019 Gubernatorial Election was held on 9 March 2019 and concluded on 25 March 2019. The incumbent governor Abubakar Muhammad has lost to the PDP Bala Muhammed in the 2019 Bauch state Governorship election. Mr Bala Mohammed, the former minister of FCT, polled a total votes of 515,113 votes to defeat the incumbent governor Abubakar Muhammad who polled 500,625 votes.

== Results ==
A total of 2,462,803 voters were registered in the state. While a total of 1,143,019 voters were accredited. A number of 1,111,406 were recorded as valid votes while 22,566 votes were annulled. Bala Muhammad was declared winner by the returning office Muhamaad Kyari with a total votes of 515,113 over the incumbent governor Muhammad Abubakar who poled 500, 625 votes. Statistics has shown that Bala was the first to defeat an incumbent government since the return of democracy in 1999. The defeated opponent Muhammad Abubakar immediately accepted defeat and congratulated Bala and wished him well.

== Overview ==
It was reported that almost 32 parties and their 20 candidates joined hands with the Peoples Democratic Party and Bala Muhammad was supported to unseat the incumbent Governor Muhammad Abubakar. These parties include among others; United Progressive Party (UPP), Green Party of Nigeria (GPN), Change advocacy Party (CPP), All Peoples Movement (APM), All Blending Party (ABP), People's Democratic Party (PDP), Action Joint Alliance (AJA), Advance Peoples democratic Alliance (APDA), Grassroots Development Party of Nigeria (GDPN) and Accord Party (AC).

=== Candidates ===
Here are some of the major candidates according to their respective parties.

s/n	Name	Party	position
1.	Abubakar Muhammad	APC	Governorship
2.	Bala Muhammad	PDP	Governorship
3.	Mohammed Ali Pate	PRP	Governorship
4.	Ambassador Shu’aibu Ahmed Adamu	NNPP	Governorship
