= Silas Ali Agara =

Nigerian politician

Deputy Governor of Nasarawa State

His Excellency Silas Ali Agara
- Incumbent
- Assumed office May 29, 2015
- Appointed by: President Bola Ahmed Tinibu
- Governor: Umaru Tanko Al-Makura

National Directorate of employment (NDE).

Personal details
- Born: Silas Ali Agara; 1 January 1973 (age 53) Nasarawa, Nigeria
- Party: All Progressives Congress
- Awards: Technology Innovation Award - Youth Council Ecowas

Silas Ali Agara (born January 1, 1973) is a Nigerian politician, sport enthusiast and a former deputy governor of Nasarawa State.

He previously served as the Special Adviser on Sports to the Nasarawa State Governor, and was announced as the running mate to Umaru Tanko Al-Makura in 2015. He is currently the Director General of the National Directorate of Employment.
