= 2015 Gombe State gubernatorial election =

State election in Nigeria

- April 11, 2015
Nominee	Ibrahim Hassan Dankwambo	Muhammad Inuwa Yahaya
Party	PDP	APC
Popular vote	285,369	205,132
Governor before election
Ibrahim Hassan Dankwambo
PDP
Elected Governor
Ibrahim Hassan Dankwambo
PDP

The 2015 Gombe State gubernatorial election was the 8th gubernatorial election of Gombe State. Held on April 11, 2015, the People's Democratic Party nominee Ibrahim Hassan Dankwambo won the election, defeating Muhammad Inuwa Yahaya of the All Progressives Congress.

== PDP primary ==
PDP candidate and incumbent governor, Ibrahim Hassan Dankwambo clinched the party ticket. He won with 492 votes out of the 504 delegates, while eight votes were invalid and four delegates were absent. He won the primary through an affirmation poll.

=== Candidates ===
- Ibrahim Hassan Dankwambo

== APC primary ==
APC candidate, Muhammad Inuwa Yahaya defeated 2 other contestants to clinch the party ticket. He won with 905 votes to defeat his closest rival, Usman Bayero Nafada, who received 727 votes. Murtala Aliyu received 22 votes. 1,700 delegates was accredited.

=== Candidates ===
- Muhammad Inuwa Yahaya
- Usman Bayero Nafada
- Murtala Aliyu

== Results ==
A total of 12 candidates contested in the election. Ibrahim Hassan Dankwambo from the People's Democratic Party won the election, defeating Muhammad Inuwa Yahaya from the All Progressives Congress.

2015 Gombe State gubernatorial election
Party	Candidate	Votes	%	±%
PDP	Ibrahim Hassan Dankwambo	285,369		
APC	Muhammad Inuwa Yahaya	205,132		
PDP hold				
