= 2011 Zamfara State gubernatorial election =

State election in Nigeria

- 26 April 2011
Nominee	Abdul'aziz Abubakar Yari	Mahmud Shinkafi
Party	ANPP	PDP
Popular vote	514,962	460,656
Governor before election
Mahmud Shinkafi
ANPP
Elected Governor
Abdul'aziz Abubakar Yari
ANPP

The 2011 Zamfara State gubernatorial election was the 4th gubernatorial election of Zamfara State. Held on 26 April 2011, the All Nigeria Peoples Party nominee Abdul'aziz Abubakar Yari won the election, defeating Mahmud Shinkafi of the People's Democratic Party.

== Results ==
A total of 17 candidates contested in the election. Abdul'aziz Abubakar Yari from the All Nigeria Peoples Party won the election, defeating Mahmud Shinkafi from the People's Democratic Party. Votes cast was 1,022,991, valid votes was 989,378, 33,613 votes was cancelled.

2011 Zamfara State gubernatorial election
Party	Candidate	Votes	%	±%
ANPP	Abdul'aziz Abubakar Yari	514,962		
PDP	Mahmud Shinkafi	460,656		
ANPP hold				
