= Goddy Jedy Agba =

Nigerian politician

Goddy Jedy Agba OFR

Minister of state Power in Nigeria
- Incumbent
- Assumed office 21 August 2019

General manager, Crude Oil Marketing Division, Nigerian National Petroleum Company (NNPC)
- In office 1995–2014

Personal details
- Born: 20 August 1958 (age 67) Obudu, Cross Rivers State
- Education: Ahmadu Bello University; University of Lagos
- Occupation: Public servant

Goddy Jedy Agba OFR, born Godwin, 20 August 1958, is a Nigerian bureaucrat, politician, farmer, author and former Group general manager, Crude Oil Marketing Division, Nigerian National Petroleum Company (NNPC). As of July 2019, he was nominated as a minister of the federal republic of Nigeria from Cross River by the government of President Muhammadu Buhari. In 1983, he had his first Degree in International Studies from Ahmadu Bello University, Zaria. He obtained his master's degree in International Law and Diplomacy from the University of Lagos, Akoka in 1989. Goddy joined Federal Civil Service in 1984 and retired at NNPC in 2014 to join the Nigerian politics.

== Background and education ==
Goddy was born into a royal family in Obudu in the year 1958 by Uti J.D. Agba, the paramount ruler from Obudu, Cross Rivers state. According to Thisday newspaper, "Agba is the first son of HRH Uti J.D. Agba, the paramount ruler of Obudu Area Council reputed to be the longest serving traditional ruler in Cross River State. Agba's father has been on the throne for over 50 years and he is a three-time chairman of the State traditional council" He bagged his first degree in International Studies from Ahmadu Bello University, Zaria, Kaduna State in 1983. in 1989, he proceeded to University of Lagos, Akoka for his master's degree in International Law and Diplomacy. He was honored as an Officer of the Order of the Federal Republic (OFR) In September 2012. Goddy's autobiography, "Stepping Forward with Uti J.D. Agba" was presented to the public on 18 November 2017.The book reflected on the influence of his father on his life from childhood. In July 2019, he was nominated for a ministerial position by the government of President Muhammadu Buhari. In August 2019, he was sworn in as the Minister of state for Power, Federal Republic of Nigeria.

== Career ==
Goddy joined the Federal civil service in September 1984 as an Assistant Secretary II. He was posted as a senior assistant secretary to the Federal Development Authority (FDA) in Lagos In October 1985. in the same office, he was promoted to the post of Deputy Liaison officer in 1987. He became the personal assistant to the minister of special duties under the presidency, state house-Lagos. In 1989, Agba was selected as personal assistant to the minister of special duties under the presidency, He was moved to the ministry of foreign affairs as personal assistant to the minister of state on foreign affairs in December 1990. He was on this position till 1993 when he became the personal assistant to the secretary of the state till 1995 when he joined NNPC. At the nation's oil company, he rose to the position of head market research, crude oil marketing department and later became the head gas/gas liquids/condensate sales, GGLU Crude Oil Marketing Department in 2014, he left NNPC to join politics in his state. After being nominated for ministerial position by President Muhammadu Buhari in July, he was assigned the portfolio of Minister of State, Power on 21 August 2019.
