= Justice Must Prevail Party =

Political party in Nigeria

- National Chairman: Dr. Olusegun Ijagbemi
- National Secretary: Olagoke Banwo David
- Founded: 2017; 9 years ago
- Headquarters: No. 2 Calabar Street, Opp Naval Headquarter, Area 7, Garki, Abuja
- Slogan: Justice, Equity and Transformation (JET).

Website
- www.jmpp.ng

The Justice Must Prevail Party (JMPP) is a political party in the Federal Republic of Nigeria. The party was registered on 14 December 2017 with the Independent National Electoral Commission (INEC). A stated goal of JMPP is to 'restore social justice, progress, equity and development to Nigeria's political landscape.' Members of the party, whether they are new to politics or coming from other parties or affiliations, must take an oath to the party's 'Twelve (12) Pillars.'
