= Advanced Congress of Democrats =

Opposition political party in Nigeria

The Advanced Congress of Democrats (ACD) was an opposition political party in Nigeria, created and first registered in March 2006. In September 2006, in merged into the newly formed Action Congress launched in 2005.

The ACD was primarily composed of former People's Democratic Party members, and was one of a series of anti-Obasanjo coalitions, beginning with the Movement for the Defence of Democracy in 2005, and followed by the AC in 2006/2007. It maintained a small independent organization after the 2007 elections, while its leaders had merged into the AC.

The party was formed by opponents of a proposed constitutional amendment that would allow incumbent President Olusegun Obasanjo to seek a third term in office, and had its base of support in the south west of Nigeria.

The then Vice-President Atiku Abubakar, a northerner who opposed a third term for Obasanjo, was believed to back the new party from its inception.

The ACD was largely made up of disgruntled PDP members who felt they had lost power and patronage to the President's supporters. Attempts by the President's supporters to amend the constitutional two term limit, allowing President Obasanjo to continue in office for a further four years, led to a rupture of the underlying tension within the party.

Three of the founders of the ACD, Alhaji Lawal Kaita, Alhaji Bashir Dalhatu and Audu Ogbeh, are former PDP politicians, and have complained of harassment and detention by the government since the ACD's founding. In March, ACD chair Alhaji Lawal Kaita, the former PDP governor of Kaduna state was detained shortly after a party rally was shut down by police in Dutse, Jigawa State.

The Vice President, who had previously shown no interest in running for president, was the main focus of these former PDP politicians in 2006. He was widely expected to be a future presidential candidate of the ACD.

In September 2006, the ACD led the creation of a coalition with the Alliance for Democracy, the Justice Party, and several other minor political parties, and forming the Action Congress. Atiku Abubakar was its presidential candidate in the 2007 general election.
