= All Blending Party =

Nigerian political party

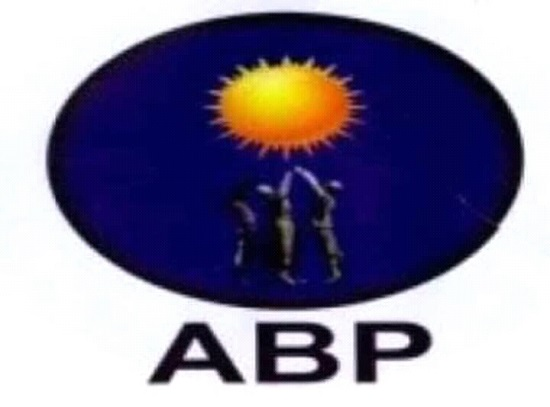
- National Chairman: Moses Shipi
- National Secretary: Uzong George Moses
- National Treasurer: Alheri Moses
- National Financial Secretary: Mrs. Josephine Eyeremi
- National Legal Adviser: Barr. Chikadibia Maduka
- Founded: 2017; 9 years ago
- Headquarters: Plot 614, Zone B, Apo Resettlement Abuja
- Slogan: Restore Our Honour & Glory

Website
- abp.org.ng

The All Blending Party is a political party in Nigeria, The party was announced by the Independent National Electoral Commission (INEC) as a full-fledged political party on December 14, 2017. Archbishop Samson Mustapha Benjamin was the visional founder and Moses Shipi is the national chairman of the party.

KEY PEOPLE AND OFFICES
Office	Name
National Chairman	Moses Shipi
National Secretary	Uzong George Moses
National Treasurer	Alheri Moses
National Financial Secretary	Mrs. Josephine Eyeremi
