= Mohammed Abdullahi Abubakar =

Nigerian politician (born 1956)

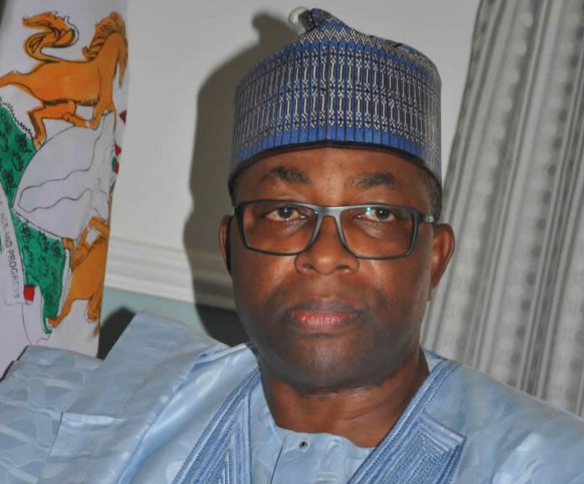

Governor of Bauchi State
- In office 29 May 2015 – 29 May 2019
- Deputy: Audu Sule Katagum.
- Preceded by: Isa Yuguda
- Succeeded by: Bala Mohammed

Personal details
- Born: 11 December 1956 (age 69) Gombe, Colonial Nigeria
- Party: All Progressives Congress
- Education: Ahmadu Bello University
- Occupation: Politician

Mohammed Abdullahi Abubakar (born 11 December 1956) is a Nigerian politician who served as governor of Bauchi State from 2015 to 2019.

He is popularly known as Makama Baba. He began his career in the Civil Service where he rose through the ranks to become the Bauchi State Attorney General and Commissioner for Justice. He ran for public office as Governor of Bauchi State in 2015 under the platform of the All Progressives Congress, the state's opposition party. He won the election, defeating the incumbent party's candidate by over 370,000 votes. He began his tenure as the governor of Bauchi on 29 August 2016, succeeding Isa Yuguda.

== Early life ==
Mohammed Abubakar was born in Gombe, to the family of Late Alhaji Abdullahi Abubakar (ACP rtd). He attended Jos Native Authority Primary School from 1963 to 1968 and proceeded to Tudun Wada Primary School Kano in 1969. He then gained admission into Government College Kano (Rumfa College, Kano) for his Secondary School education from 1970 to 1974. he crowned as first Makama Babba of Bauchi.

== Education ==
On completion of his Secondary School education, Barrister Mohammed A. Abubakar proceeded to School of Basic Studies, Ahmadu Bello University Zaria for one year pre-degree programme. He was among the first set of students of School of Basic Studies of Ahmadu Bello University Zaria in 1974. From 1975 to 1978 he studied at the Faculty of law, Ahmadu Bello University Zaria where he got his LLB Hons.

He proceeded to the Nigerian Law School, Lagos from 1978 to 1979 for his BL course. He was called to bar after successfully completing the course and from 1979 to 1980, during his National Youth Service Corps, he lectured at Rivers State College of Science and Technology (presently University of Science and Technology, Rivers State).

== Civil Service Career ==
On completion of his youth service, Barrister Mohammed Abubakar joined the civil service as a Pupil State Counsel in the Ministry of Justice, Bauchi State. He rose through the ranks to the position of Senior Parliamentary Counsel and Head of Legal Drafting Department of Bauchi State House of Assembly in 1983.

== Private practice, INEC and political career ==
When the military intervened again in 1993, Barrister Mohammed Abubakar went into private practice as Managing Partner of Fortuna Chambers. He became the Chairman of Nigerian Bar Association, Bauchi State Branch from 1996 to 1998 and was elected Deputy National Secretary of the Democratic People's Party in 1997. He was appointed Resident Electoral Commissioner of the INEC - The Independent National Electoral Commission and served in Kogi, Delta, Plateau and Rivers States between 1999 and 2003. In 2003, he was promoted to National Electoral Commissioner in charge of Legal Services and supervisor of Borno, Jigawa, and Yobe states. He retired from INEC in 2008 and went back to legal practice as Managing Partner of M A Abubakar & Co. (Fortuna Chambers). This law firm has offices in Abuja, Port Harcourt and Bauchi State.

In June 2013 Barrister Mohammed Abubakar was appointed a member of the National Judicial Council, NJC, and on 11 April 2015 he was the elected Governor of Bauchi State, Nigeria on the platform of the All Progressives Congress (APC). In the 2019 Election, he lost to the PDPs Bala Mohammed in the process becoming the first ever governor in Bauchi to not win his reelection bid.

== Personal life ==
Barrister Abubakar is married with children. He is an avid supporter of football clubs - Manchester United and Wikki Tourists.

== See also ==
- List of governors of Bauchi State
