= Democratic Alternative (Nigeria) =

Political party in Nigeria

Democratic Alternative is a Nigerian opposition political party.

On June 3 and 4, 1994, about 200 Nigerians critical of the military politicians and collaborators met in Benin City to examine the political impasse and decide on a political plan for the country and the peoples. The conference concluded with the adoption of the Constitution and Manifesto, The Liberation Charter to inaugurate the Democratic Alternative (DA). The organisation thereby emerged as a political party at the time Sani Abacha was implementing a policy that made it illegal for Nigerians to associate in political parties. The participants in the conference defied the dictatorship and launched what has become the oldest existing political party in Nigeria.

A National Executive Council with Alao Aka-Bashorun and Chima Ubani as President and Secretary-General, respectively, were elected to run the affairs of the party. As demanded by the political situation, the activities of the party from its inception until the demise of direct military dictatorship in the country were focussed on building the party at the national, state and local government levels; engaging in anti-dictatorship protest activities either alone or in association with other anti-dictatorship organisations to enforce the end of anti-democratic and military rule in Nigeria; and operating political education programmes for workers and the peasants in towns, villages and cities across the country.

The party school, Nigerian Peoples’ Institute for Democracy (NIPID) was established in 2003 to carry out formal programmes of political education among members and in the general population. The military dictatorship collapsed to constitutional rule on May 29, 1999. The party was denied free participation in the elections of 1999, but continued with its educational programmes, territorial expansion and popular activities against the right wing parties. At its Convention in Ilorin on January 11, 2003, the party decided to show its programme to the peoples of Nigeria by participating in the 2003 elections following legal victory along with other parties that led to the formal registration of the DA. By fielding candidates at the presidential, some governorship and legislative elections, the party was successful in showcasing its Manifesto and programme in government to the Nigerian peoples.

In May 2017, H.E. Prince Frank Ukonga became the new National Chairman of DA- Democratic Alternative and through his remarkable dexterity has transformed Democratic Alternative to be ranked among the top ten political parties in Nigeria and Africa. the New office of Democratic Alternative -DA is at plot 750 Aminu Kano Crescent, Wuse/Maitama District of Abuja, FCT. The policy thrust of DA is to contest the 2019 general elections in Nigeria with focus on raising the GNP of Nigeria to above 2,5 trillion Dollars by 2024, generate 50,000 MW Electricity, produce liquid steel to jump start the Nigerian industrial, Economic and Agricultural Revolution that would create more than 30 million direct jobs and over 50 million jobs in the downstream sectors. This would position the Nigerian state among the top economic giants of the world.
