= National Conscience Party =

Nationalist political party in Nigeria

- National Chairman: Dr. Tanko Yinusa
- Founded: 1994
- Headquarters: Gwagwalada, Nigeria
- Ideology: Participatory democracy Socialism
- Political position: Left-wing

The National Conscience Party (NCP) is a nationalist political party in Nigeria. The party formed in 1994. However, it was prevented from standing in elections until 2003, when it won a legal battle to be able to do so. In the presidential election of that year, the NCP candidate, Gani Fawehinmi, came fifth, polling 161,333 votes or 0.41% of the popular vote.

The party lost its electoral registration in 2020 as part of a larger wave in which the INEC deregistered a total of 72 parties. In 2023 the party endorsed Peter Obi, presidential candidate of the Labour Party (Nigeria). In 2025 the NCP announced an alliance with the African Democratic Congress to present a joint opposition to the administration of Bola Tinubu.
