= KOWA Party =

Political party in Nigeria

- Abbreviation: KP
- National chairman: Saidu Bobboi
- Founded: July 2009
- Headquarters: 129 Corner Shop, Beside Total Filling Station, Fed. Housing Est., Lugbe, Abuja
- Ideology: Technocracy
- Slogan: “Together, we make a difference”

Website
- kowaparty.ng

KOWA Party (KP) is a political party in Nigeria. KOWA was registered as a political party by the Independent National Electoral Commission on July 16, 2009, by a group of Nigerian Civil Society activists, professionals and technocrats. The current National Chairman of the party is Mr. Saidu Bobboi.

KOWA Party is the first Nigerian political party to adopt online voting, exam writing for candidates in the presidential primary election of the party.
