= Politics of Nigeria =

- Coat of arms
- Constitution: Constitution of Nigeria
- Formation: 1 October 1963 (62 years ago)

Legislative branch
- Name: National Assembly
- Meeting place: National Assembly Complex, Abuja

Executive branch
- Head of state and government
- Title: President
- Currently: Bola Tinubu
- Cabinet
- Name: Federal Executive Council
- Headquarters: Aso Rock Presidential Villa, Abuja

Judicial branch
- Supreme Court
- Seat: Abuja

The federal government of Nigeria is composed of three distinct arms: the executive, the legislative, and the judicial, whose powers are vested and bestowed upon by the Constitution of the Federal Republic of Nigeria. One of the primary functions of the constitution is that it provides for separation and balance of powers among the three branches and aims to prevent the repetition of past mistakes made by the government. Other functions of the constitution include a division of power between the federal government and the states, and protection of various individual liberties of the nation's citizens.

Nigerian politics take place within a framework of a federal and presidential republic and a representative democracy, in which the president holds executive power. Legislative power is held by the federal government and the two chambers of the legislature: the House of Representatives and the Senate. The legislative arm of Nigeria is responsible for and possesses powers to legislate laws. Together, the two chambers form the law-making body in Nigeria, called the National Assembly, which serves as a check on the executive arm of government. The National Assembly of Nigeria (NASS) is the democratically elected body that represents the interests of the Federal Republic of Nigeria and its people, makes laws for Nigeria, and holds the Government of Nigeria to account. The National Assembly (NASS) is the nation's highest legislature, whose power to make laws is summarized in chapter one, section four of the 1999 Nigerian Constitution. Sections 47–49 of the 1999 Constitution state, among other things, that "There shall be a National Assembly (NASS) for the federation which shall consist of two chambers: the Senate and the House of Representatives." The Economist Intelligence Unit rated Nigeria a "hybrid regime" in 2019. The federal government, state, and local governments of Nigeria aim to work cooperatively to govern the nation and its people. Nigeria became a member of the British Commonwealth upon its independence from British colonial rule on 1 October 1960.

== Legal system ==
The law of Nigeria is based on the rule of law, the independence of the judiciary, and British common law (due to the long history of British colonial influence). The common law in the legal system is similar to common-law systems used in England and Wales and other Commonwealth countries. The constitutional framework for the legal system is provided by the Constitution of Nigeria.

The major influences on Nigeria's legal system are:

- English law, derived from its colonial past with Britain: Nigeria belongs to the common law family. This is because English law makes up a substantial part of the Nigerian law. Nigeria, though now a sovereign nation, was once under British rule. Upon gaining independence in 1960, numerous English laws were copied, and most of the laws have since been repealed in England. Nigeria also adopted all laws that were in force in England on 1 January 1900.
- Common law, case law has developed since colonial independence; common law can be defined as that unwritten body of laws based on judicial precedents. For unusual and irregular occurring cases where the result can in no way be resolved by the basis of current laws or written law regulations, common law guides the decision-making process.
- Customary law, which is derived from Indigenous traditional norms and practices. In Nigeria, customary law can be divided, in terms of nature, into two different classes, which are the ethnic or non-Muslim customary law and the Muslim law (Sharia). The ethnic customary law in Nigeria is Indigenous, and this system of customary law applies and is valid to members of a specific ethnic group. Muslim law is a religious law that is solely based on the Muslim faith and applies to the members of such faith. In the nation of Nigeria, it is not an indigenous law; it is a received customary law introduced into the country as part of Islam.
- Sharia law, law used in some states in the northern region. In two principal respects the sharia law greatly differs from Western systems of law. Sharia law possesses a much wider scope, since it regulates the individual's relationship, not only with his or her neighbors and the state, which is perceived as the limit of most other legal systems, but also with God and with the individual's own conscience. Ritual practices—such as daily prayers (ṣalāt), almsgiving (zakāt), fasting (ṣawm), and pilgrimage (hajj)—are an integral part of sharia law and usually occupy the first chapters in legal manuals. The sharia is concerned as much with ethical standards as with legal rules, indicating not only what an individual is entitled, or bound to do in law, but also what one ought, in conscience, to do, or to refrain from doing.

=== Legislation as a source of Nigerian law ===
The two fundamental sources of Nigerian law through legislation are:

(1) Acts of British parliament, popularly referred to as statutes of general application during the period before independence.

(2) Local legislation (comprising enactments of the Nigerian legislatures from colonial period to date). There were other sources which, though subsumed in Nigerian legislations, were distinctly imported into the Nigerian legal systems. They are called the criminal and penal codes of Nigeria.

=== Nigerian statutes as sources of Nigerian law ===
Nigerian legislation may be classified as follows: The colonial era until 1960, post-independence legislation 1960–1966, the military era 1966–1999.

=== Post-independence legislation 1960–1966 ===
The grant of independence to Nigeria was a milestone in the political history of the country. This period witnessed the consolidation of political gains made during the colonial era. Politicians genuinely focused their lapses on the polity. It achieved for herself a republican status by shaking off the last vestiges of colonial authority. However, despite the violent violation of its provisions, the constitution remained the subsequent administrations (military or otherwise).

=== Military regime, 1966–1999 ===
The Armed Forces of Nigeria assumed the rulership of Nigeria from 1966–1979 and 1983–1999. The breakdown of law and order which occurred in the period under review would not be attributed to any defect in the Nigerian legal system. Corrupt practices both in the body politics and all aspects of Nigerian life eroded efficiency and progress. There were eight coups generally; five were successful and three were unsuccessful.

== Executive branch ==
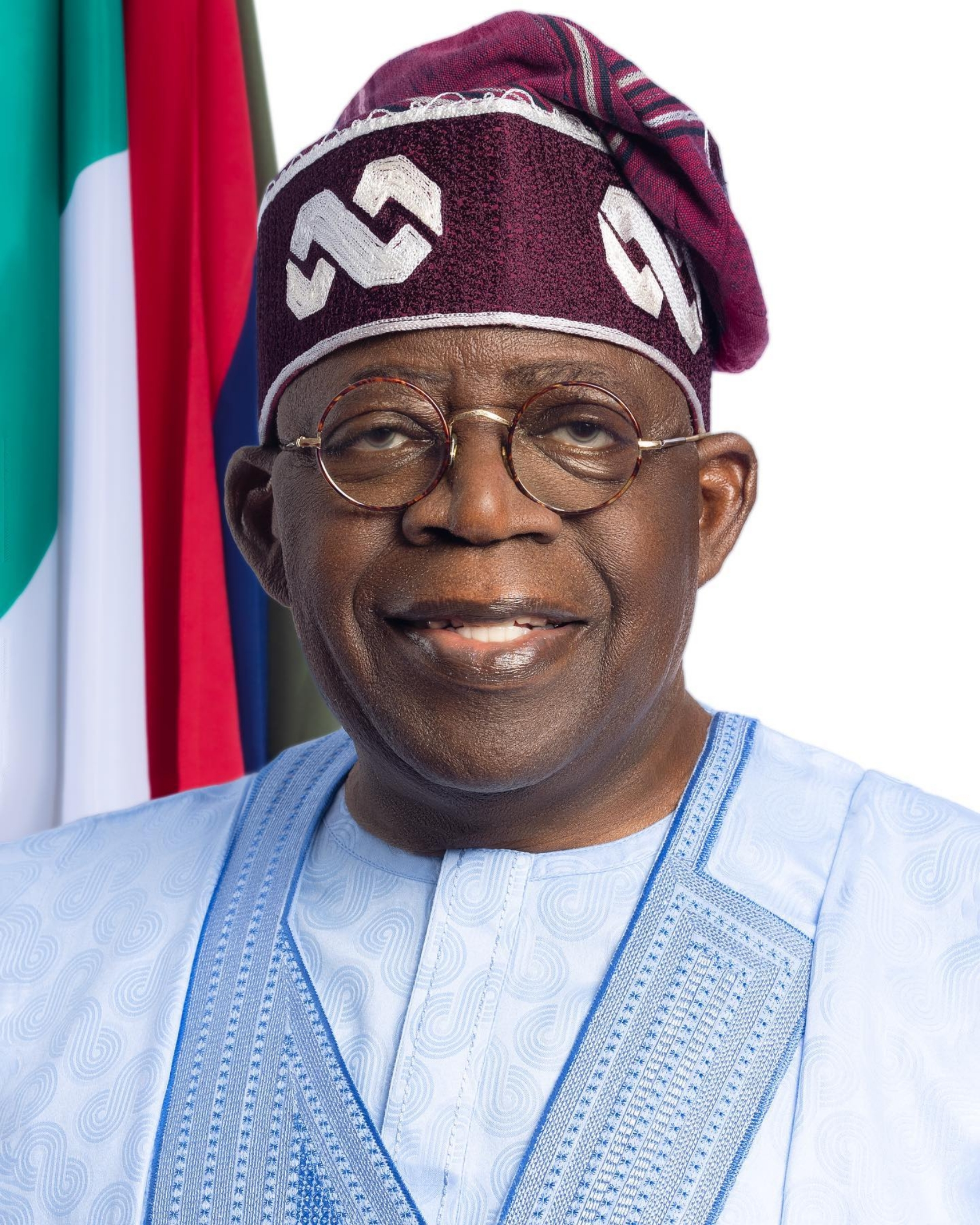
Current President of Nigeria, Bola Tinubu

The president is elected through universal suffrage which is regarded as more than a privilege extended by the state to its citizenry, and it is rather thought of as an inalienable right that inheres to every adult citizen by virtue of citizenship. In democracies it is the primary means of ensuring that governments are responsible to the governed. The president is head of both the state and government, and heads the cabinet of Nigeria, the Federal Executive Council. The constitution also sanctions the president's status as commander-in-chief of the armed forces in Section 130. The constitution of 1999 vests all the executive powers of the federation in the person of the president which can be exercised directly by him or his vice president or members of his cabinet. Section 5(1)(b) provides that the executive powers of the president extends to the maintenance of the provisions of the constitution, acts of the national assembly and on items on which the national assembly has power for the time being to make law. The president is elected to see that the Nigerian Constitution is enacted and that the legislation is applied to the people. The elected president is also in charge of the nation's armed forces and can serve no more than two four-year elected terms. The current president of Nigeria is Bola Tinubu, who was elected in 2023, and the current vice president is Kashim Shettima.

The executive branch is divided into Federal Ministries, each headed by a minister appointed by the president, Federal Ministries are those civil service departments which were made responsible for delivering various types of government service and each ministry is headed by a permanent secretary who reports to a minister in the Federal Cabinet. Nigeria has 24 Federal Ministries. The president must include at least one member from each of the 36 states in his cabinet. The president's appointments are confirmed by the Senate of Nigeria. In some cases, a federal minister is responsible for more than one ministry (for example, Environment and Housing may be combined), or a minister may be assisted by one or more ministers of state. Each ministry also has a permanent secretary, who is a senior civil servant.

The ministries are responsible for various parastatals (government-owned corporations), such as universities, the National Broadcasting Commission, and the Nigerian National Petroleum Corporation. However, some parastatals are the responsibility of the Office of the Presidency, such as the Independent National Electoral Commission, the Economic and Financial Crimes Commission and the Federal Civil Service Commission.

== Legislative branch ==
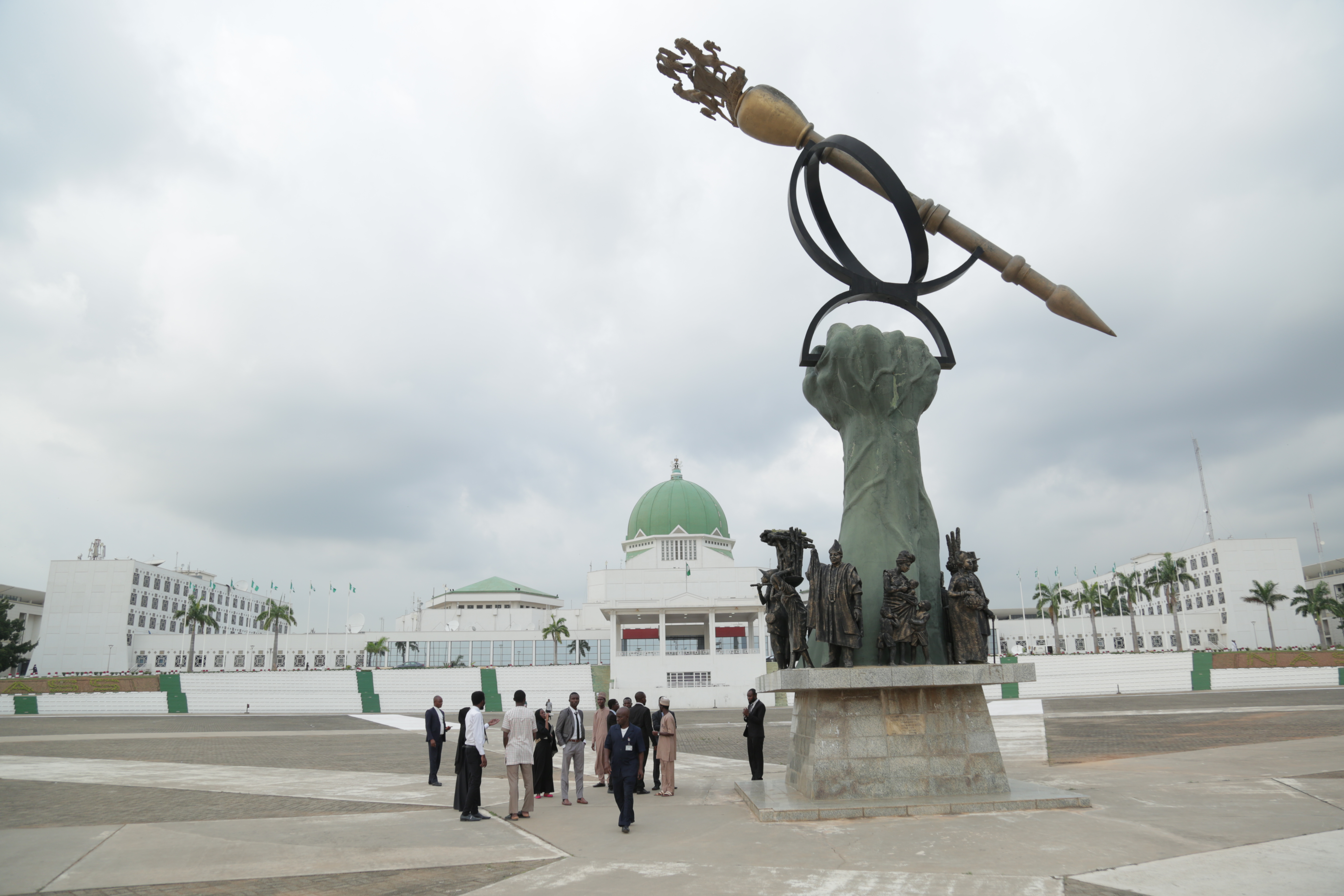
Nigeria's National Assembly building with the mace

The legislature is said to be the first among the three arms of government – the legislature, executive, and the judiciary. The principle of separation of powers characterises these arms as each is supposed to be independent of the other. The legislature derives its powers from the 1999 Constitution (as amended) in Sections 4(1) and 4(2). The legislature is vested with the powers to make laws for the peace, order and good governance of the Federation.

“It is also vested with investigatory powers, financial powers, confirmation and impeachment powers. The Legislature is the symbol of democracy all over the world. Under Section 4 (1) of the 1999 Constitution of the Federal Republic of Nigeria (as amended) (the "Constitution"), the National Assembly of Nigeria often called NASS is vested with the legislative powers of the Federal Republic of Nigeria. That is the power to make laws for the peace, order, and good government of the Federation with respect to any matter included in the Exclusive Legislative List and the Concurrent List – a list of 12 items that both NASS and states' house of assembly can legislate on. This legislative power is typically exercised through bills passed by the NASS which are assented to by the president. Bills generally come in two forms – either a private bill which affects private citizens, corporate entities and/or a particular class of people or public bills which affect the general public. A bill can be introduced in either chamber of the NASS by members of the respective chambers or the executive arm of government. The National Assembly of Nigeria has two chambers: the House of Representatives and the Senate. The House of Representatives is the lower chamber of Nigeria's bicameral National Assembly and is presided over by the speaker of the House of Representatives. It has 360 members each of the federal constituencies of the country, who are elected for four-year terms in single-seat constituencies. The Senate, which has 109 members, is presided over by the president of the Senate. A total of 108 members are elected for four-year terms in 36 three-seat constituencies, which correspond to the country's 36 states. One member is selected in the single-seat constituency of the federal capital.

Legislators are elected to either the House of Representatives or the Senate to represent their constituencies and to pass legislation that benefits the public. The legislative process consists of bills being drafted and presented in either of the two chambers. These bills can only become national law once they are approved by the president of Nigeria who can veto bills.

The current president of the Senate is Godswill Akpabio, who was first elected to the Senate in 2015, and the Speaker of the House is Tajudeen Abbas, he was first elected to the Nigerian House of Representatives in 2011 and was elected Speaker in 2023. Each member of the National Assembly of Nigeria can be elected to more than two four-year terms. Recently, the legislative branch has been misusing its position as a check on the power of the president and his cabinet. Legislators have been known to utilize their power for not only for law-making, but as a means of political intimidation and a tool to promote individual monetary success.

Senators are paid a salary equivalent to over $2,200 USD a month, supplemented by expenses of $37,500 USD a month (2018 figures).

== Judicial branch ==
The judicial branch is made up of the Supreme Court of Nigeria, the Court of Appeals, the high courts, and other trial courts such as the magistrates', customary, Sharia and other specialized courts. The National Judicial Council serves as an independent executive body, insulating the judiciary from the executive arm of government. According to the 1999 constitution, the Supreme Court has both original and appellate jurisdictions (the power to reverse, modify and change a decision or ruling made by a lower court). Appellate jurisdiction exists for both the civil law and criminal law, the supreme court has the sole authority and jurisdiction to entertain appeals from Court of Appeal, having appellate jurisdiction over all lower federal courts and highest state courts. Decisions and rulings by the court are binding and absolute on all courts in Nigeria except the Supreme Court itself. The Supreme Court is composed of the chief justice of Nigeria and other justices not more than 21 including the chief justice, appointed by the president of Nigeria on the recommendation of the National Judicial Council. These justices are subject to confirmation by the Senate.

The judicial branch of the Nigerian government is the only one of the three branches of government in which its members are not elected but are appointed. The judiciary, and the Supreme Court in particular, are intended to uphold the principles and laws of the nation's constitution that was written in 1999. Its goal is to protect the basic rights of the citizens. The current chief justice of the Supreme Court is Kudirat Kekere-Ekun.

Justices of the Supreme Court of Nigeria
Office	Name	Term
Chief Justice	Kudirat Kekere-Ekun	2013–present
Associate Justice	John Inyang Okoro	2013–present
Associate Justice	Uwani Musa Abba Aji	2018–present
Associate Justice	M. Lawal Garba	2020–present
Associate Justice	Helen M. Ogunwumiju	2020–present
Associate Justice	I. N. M. Saulawa	2020–present
Associate Justice	Adamu Jauro	2020–present
Associate Justice	Tijjani Abubakar	2020–present
Associate Justice	Emmanuel A. Agim	2020–present
Associate Justice	Haruna Tsammani	2023–present
Associate Justice	Moore Adumein	2023–present
Associate Justice	Jummai Sankey	2023–present
Associate Justice	Chidiebere Uwa	2023–present
Associate Justice	Chioma Nwosu-Iheme	2023–present
Associate Justice	Obande Ogbuinya	2023–present
Associate Justice	Stephen Adah	2023–present
Associate Justice	Habeeb Abiru	2023–present
Associate Justice	Jamilu Tukur	2023–present
Associate Justice	Abubakar Umar	2023–present
Associate Justice	Mohammed Idris	2023–present

== Democracy in Nigeria ==
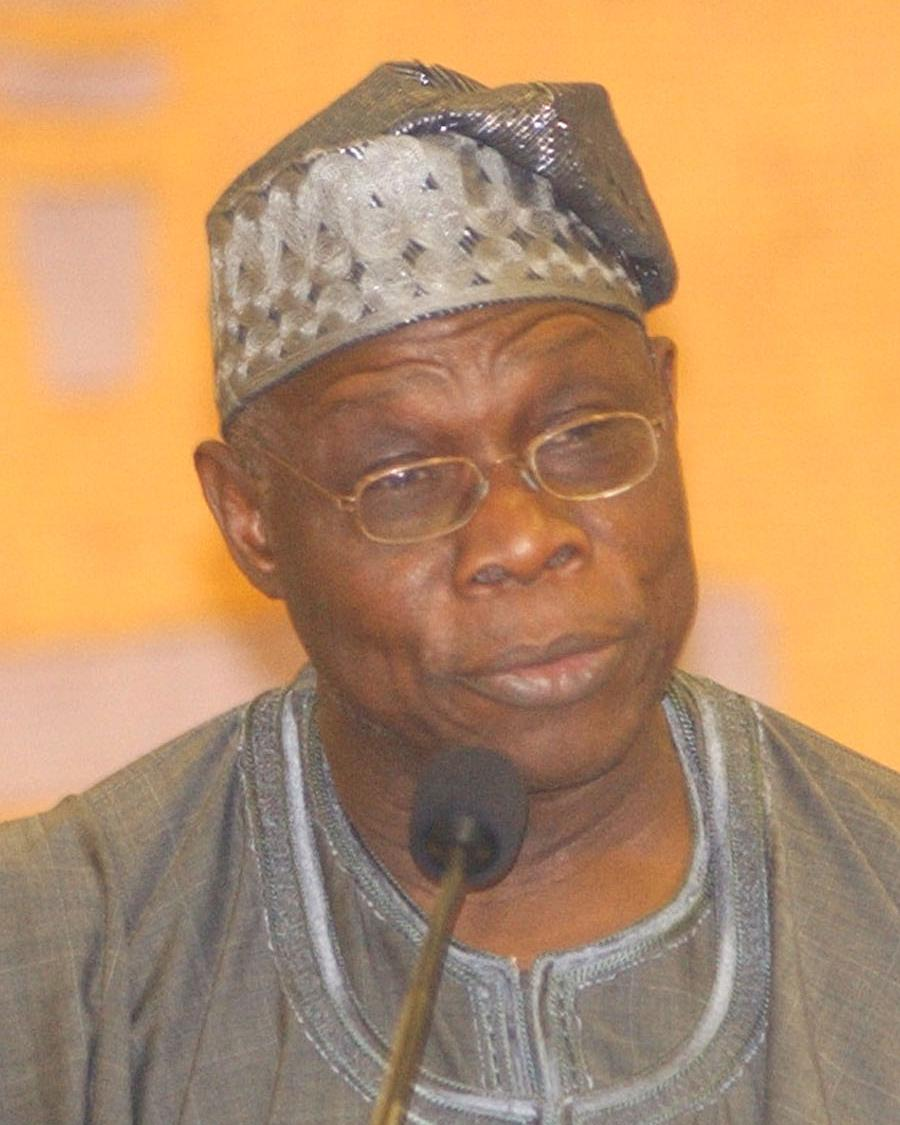
Olusegun Obasanjo, elected president in 1999

After achieving its independence in 1960 and republican status in 1963, Nigeria became the fourth largest democracy in the world. However, in 1966 Nigeria experienced its first military coup, followed by a civil war, which lasted until 1970. Democracy returned briefly from 1978 to 1983 before military rulers came into power via coup d'état. They promised to return the country to democracy.

After the death of Sani Abacha 1998, General Abdulsalami Abubakar came to power and during his time in office a modified constitution was enacted in 1999. The 1999 elections saw Olusegun Obasanjo become president, stopping a cycle of military regimes. The end of the military rule brought regular elections as well as the return of civil liberties, a free press, and an end to arbitrary arrests and maltreatment, although human rights violations still occur regularly.

Although corruption and undue influence of elites remain, Nigerian elections have become less fraudulent and more competitive, and individuals and media have greater freedom of speech. Furthermore, Nigeria has seen a heightened use of media within the realm of political issues, particularly with the recent End SARS protest against police brutality perpetuated by the Special Anti-Robbery Squad.

=== Level of freedom ===
According to the 2024 World Press Freedom Index, Nigeria is the 112th out of 180 countries for press freedom. It has been noted as a nation with perpetuating violence against freedom of speech and press. Nigeria has been found to be a vulnerable nation, both at risk of modern slavery and corruption. The nation is vulnerable due to the effects of inner conflict and governance issues. Freedom House has rated Nigeria as a "partly free" nation. In the last presidential election, the process was tainted by violence, intimidation and vote buying, which have been prevalent in many of the recent elections within Nigeria. Similarly, in the most recent legislative elections, citizens claimed the process was also characterized by intimidation and other inconsistencies. The electoral process and related laws are thought to be enacted in a mostly fair fashion, but there have been instances of intentionally complicating voting and affecting turnout. The people of Nigeria feel as though there is more freedom in their right to have different political parties to represent their opinions. This is exemplified by the vast number of legitimate parties seen in elections. Similarly, Nigerian opposition parties have a legitimate chance to participate in politics and win official positions.

In regards to freedom of political expression, Freedom House indicates that opinions and institutions are often heavily influenced by non-governmental, external entities or individuals. In Nigeria, all ethnic groups and religious backgrounds have an equal opportunity to participate in politics, however, there is a lack of women elected into the government, and same-sex relationships were criminalized in 2014.

The Nigerian federal government's officials like the president and legislators are elected to enact policy and laws, and are usually allowed to do so without interruption, but in recent years, their ability to legislate has been marred by corruption and instability. Corruption has been a major problem for the Nigerian government since its independence from colonial rule. In particular, the oil sector has allowed a great deal of corruption to take place. The government has tried to enact measures to combat corruption that infringes upon the functioning of the state, but have only been quasi-successful.

The government has also been rated as lacking in transparency, often not allowing records to be available to the public that should be readily available. Journalism and the media in Nigeria are somewhat free, they are allowed to function independently from the government, but oftentimes those who criticize public figures or offices are arrested or censored.

Religious freedom is allowed in Nigeria, however, the government and even non-governmental organizations have been known to violently respond to groups that openly dissent to the federal government. Religion is a contentious topic in Nigeria because of heated, ongoing conflicts between Christians and Muslims within the state.

Freedom House rated the Nigerian federal government well in the category of allowing academic freedom, and the public's ability to express their views even if they disagree without fearing a negative reaction from the government. The Nigerian government was rated moderately on people's ability to assemble, ability to work with human rights, and the existence of unions. The judiciary was rated as moderately free from the government, and lacking in due process in trials and equal treatment of all members of society.

People in Nigeria do not have great freedom of movement, and are often subjected to curfews set by the federal government in areas that are at a risk of violence or instability. There is a lack of protection for women in regards to rights to abortion, rape, and domestic abuse under the Nigerian federal government. Lastly, there is a pervasive human-trafficking problem in Nigeria and frequent exploitation of citizens that the federal government has done a poor job to prevent.

== Political parties ==
There are 18 recognized political parties in Nigeria. There are a great number of parties as a direct result of corruption and chaos that has ensued in Nigeria surrounding the federal government and elections for years. The vast number of parties has proved to be difficult to monitor. The two major parties are the Peoples Democratic Party and the All Progressives Congress, both of which have held the presidency and seats in the National Assembly for extended periods of time. As opposed to parties in other nations that represent a slew of political opinions that the public can align themselves with, parties in Nigeria act more so as a means through which prominent figures can gain power and influence, and there are so many because they often switch parties to find the one to give them the best chance of achieving authority.

Political parties have been an important aspect of Nigerian government both before and after independence was achieved from the British in 1960. Parties allow for political competition to take place, for the citizenry to find people who represent their ideas and interests in government, and for the introduction of new leaders and perspectives into Nigerian life. Many Nigerians do not understand the political party system because there are so many options and their platforms are unclear to the public. This remains an issue in Nigeria because it marginalizes those who are uneducated or uninvolved in government. Also, there seems to be a tendency for people in Nigeria to support parties based on ethnic or religious divisions, particularly along the Muslim-Christian line of division.

The 18 political parties are: Accord, Action Alliance, Action Democratic Party, Action Peoples Party, African Action Congress, African Democratic Congress, All Progressives Congress, All Progressives Grand Alliance, Allied Peoples Movement, Boot Party, Labour Party, National Rescue Movement, New Nigeria Peoples Party, Peoples Democratic Party, Peoples Redemption Party, Social Democratic Party, Young Progressive Party, Zenith Labour Party.

== Electoral system and recent elections ==
The president and members of the National Assembly of Nigeria are elected by members of the population who are at least 18 years old. The National Electoral Commission is responsible for monitoring elections and ensuring that the results are correct and not fraudulent. The winner of a position is elected through the first-past-the-post system that is used in Great Britain.

Nigeria has faced numerous bouts with fraudulent elections, particularly noteworthy is the general election that took place in 2007. This election was reportedly marred by ballot-rigging, underage voting, violence, intimidation, and an overall absence of clarity and accuracy from the National Electoral Commission.

=== Presidential elections of Nigeria, 2015 ===
Buhari	53.96%
Jonathan	44.96%
Margin: 2,571,759

Candidate	Party	Votes	%
Muhammadu Buhari	All Progressives Congress	15,424,921	53.96
Goodluck Jonathan	People's Democratic Party	12,853,162	44.96
Adebayo Ayeni	African Peoples Alliance	53,537	0.19
Ganiyu Galadima	Allied Congress Party of Nigeria	40,311	0.14
Sam Eke	Citizens Popular Party	36,300	0.13
Rufus Salau	Alliance for Democracy	30,673	0.11
Mani Ahmad	African Democratic Congress	29,665	0.10
Allagoa Chinedu	Peoples Party of Nigeria	24,475	0.09
Martin Onovo	National Conscience Party	24,455	0.09
Tunde Anifowose-Kelani	Accord Alliance BOP	22,125	0.08
Chekwas Okorie	United Progressive Party	18,220	0.06
Comfort Sonaiya	KOWA Party	13,076	0.05
Godson Okoye	United Democratic Party	9,208	0.03
Ambrose Albert Owuru	Hope Party	7,435	0.03
Invalid/blank votes		844,519	–
Total		29,432,083	100
Registered voters/turnout		67,422,005	43.65
Source: INEC

=== House of Representatives ===
Party	Votes	%	Seats	+/–
All Progressives Congress			100	
People's Democratic Party			125	
Other parties			10	
Invalid/blank votes		–	–	–
Total			235	–
Registered voters/turnout			–	–
Source: Reuters Nigeria Tribune

=== Senate ===
Party	Votes	%	Seats	+/–
All Progressives Congress			60	▲19
People's Democratic Party			70	▲15
Labour Party				
Invalid/blank votes		–	–	–
Total			109	–
Registered voters/turnout			–	–

=== Presidential election of Nigeria, 2019 ===
Candidate	Party	Votes	%
Muhammadu Buhari	All Progressives Congress	15,191,847	55.60
Atiku Abubakar	People's Democratic Party	11,262,978	41.22
Felix Nicolas	Peoples Coalition Party	110,196	0.40
Obadiah Mailafia	African Democratic Congress	97,874	0.36
Gbor John Wilson Terwase	All Progressives Grand Alliance	66,851	0.24
Yabagi Sani Yusuf	Action Democratic Party	54,930	0.20
Akhimien Davidson Isibor	Grassroots Development Party of Nigeria	41,852	0.15
Ibrahim Aliyu Hassan	African Peoples Alliance	36,866	0.13
Donald Duke	Social Democratic Party	34,746	0.13
Omoyele Sowore	African Action Congress	33,953	0.12
Da-Silva Thomas Ayo	Save Nigeria Congress	28,680	0.10
Shitu Mohammed Kabir	Advanced Peoples Democratic Alliance	26,558	0.10
Yusuf Mamman Dantalle	Allied Peoples' Movement	26,039	0.10
Kingsley Moghalu	Young Progressive Party	21,886	0.08
Ameh Peter Ojonugwa	Progressive Peoples Alliance	21,822	0.08
Ositelu Isaac Babatunde	Accord Party	19,209	0.07
Fela Durotoye	Alliance for New Nigeria	16,779	0.06
Bashayi Isa Dansarki	Masses Movement of Nigeria	14,540	0.05
Osakwe Felix Johnson	Democratic People's Party	14,483	0.05
Abdulrashid Hassan Baba	Action Alliance	14,380	0.05
Nwokeafor Ikechukwu Ndubuisi	Advanced Congress of Democrats	11,325	0.04
Maina Maimuna Kyari	Northern People's Congress	10,081	0.04
Victor Okhai	Providence Peoples Congress	8,979	0.03
Chike Ukaegbu	Advanced Allied Party	8,902	0.03
Oby Ezekwesili	Allied Congress Party of Nigeria	7,223	0.03
Ibrahim Usman Alhaji	National Rescue Movement	6,229	0.02
Ike Keke	New Nigeria People's Party	6,111	0.02
Moses Ayibiowu	National Unity Party	5,323	0.02
Awosola Williams Olusola	Democratic Peoples Congress	5,242	0.02
Muhammed Usman Zaki	Labour Party	5,074	0.02
Eke Samuel Chukwuma	Green Party of Nigeria	4,924	0.02
Nwachukwu Chuks Nwabuikwu	All Grassroots Alliance	4,689	0.02
Hamza al-Mustapha	Peoples Party of Nigeria	4,622	0.02
Shipi Moses Godia	All Blended Party	4,523	0.02
Chris Okotie	Fresh Democratic Party	4,554	0.02
Tope Fasua	Abundant Nigeria Renewal Party	4,340	0.02
Onwubuya	Freedom And Justice Party	4,174	0.02
Asukwo Mendie Archibong	Nigeria For Democracy	4,096	0.01
Ahmed Buhari	Sustainable National Party	3,941	0.01
Salisu Yunusa Tanko	National Conscience Party	3,799	0.01
Shittu Moshood Asiwaju	Alliance National Party	3,586	0.01
Obinna Uchechukwu Ikeagwuonu	All People's Party	3,585	0.01
Balogun Isiaka Ishola	United Democratic Party	3,170	0.01
Obaje Yusufu Ameh	Advanced Nigeria Democratic Party	3,104	0.01
Chief Umenwa Godwin	All Grand Alliance Party	3,071	0.01
Israel Nonyerem Davidson,	Reform and Advancement Party	2,972	0.01
Ukonga Frank	Democratic Alternative	2,769	0.01
Santuraki Hamisu	Mega Party of Nigeria	2,752	0.01
Funmilayo Adesanya-Davies	Mass Action Joint Alliance	2,651	0.01
Gbenga Olawepo-Hashim	Peoples Trust	2,613	0.01
Ali Soyode	Yes Electorates Solidarity	2,394	0.01
Nsehe Nseobong	Restoration Party of Nigeria	2,388	0.01
Ojinika Geff Chizee	Coalition for Change	2,391	0.01
Rabia Yasai Hassan Cengiz	National Action Council	2,279	0.01
Eunice Atuejide	National Interest Party	2,248	0.01
Dara John	Alliance of Social Democrats	2,146	0.01
Fagbenro-byron Samuel Adesina	Kowa Party	1,911	0.01
Emmanuel Etim	Change Nigeria Party	1,874	0.01
Chukwu-Eguzolugo Sunday Chikendu	Justice Must Prevail Party	1,853	0.01
Madu Nnamdi Edozie	Independent Democrats	1,845	0.01
Osuala Chukwudi John	Re-build Nigeria Party	1,792	0.01
Albert Owuru Ambrose	Hope Democratic Party	1,663	0.01
David Esosa Ize-Iyamu	Better Nigeria Progressive Party	1,649	0.01
Inwa Ahmed Sakil	Unity Party of Nigeria	1,631	0.01
Akpua Robinson	National Democratic Liberty Party	1,588	0.01
Mark Emmanuel Audu	United Patriots	1,561	0.01
Ishaka Paul Ofemile	Nigeria Elements Progressive Party	1,524	0.01
Kriz David	Liberation Movement	1,438	0.01
Ademola Babatunde Abidemi	Nigeria Community Movement Party	1,378	0.01
A. Edosomwan Johnson	National Democratic Liberty Party	1,192	0.00
Angela Johnson	Alliance for a United Nigeria	1,092	0.00
Abah Lewis Elaigwu	Change Advocacy Party	1,111	0.00
Nwangwu Uchenna Peter	We The People Nigeria	732	0.00
Invalid/blank votes		1,289,607	–
Total		28,614,190	100
Registered voters/turnout		82,344,107	34.75
Source: Vanguard

== Christian–Muslim relations ==
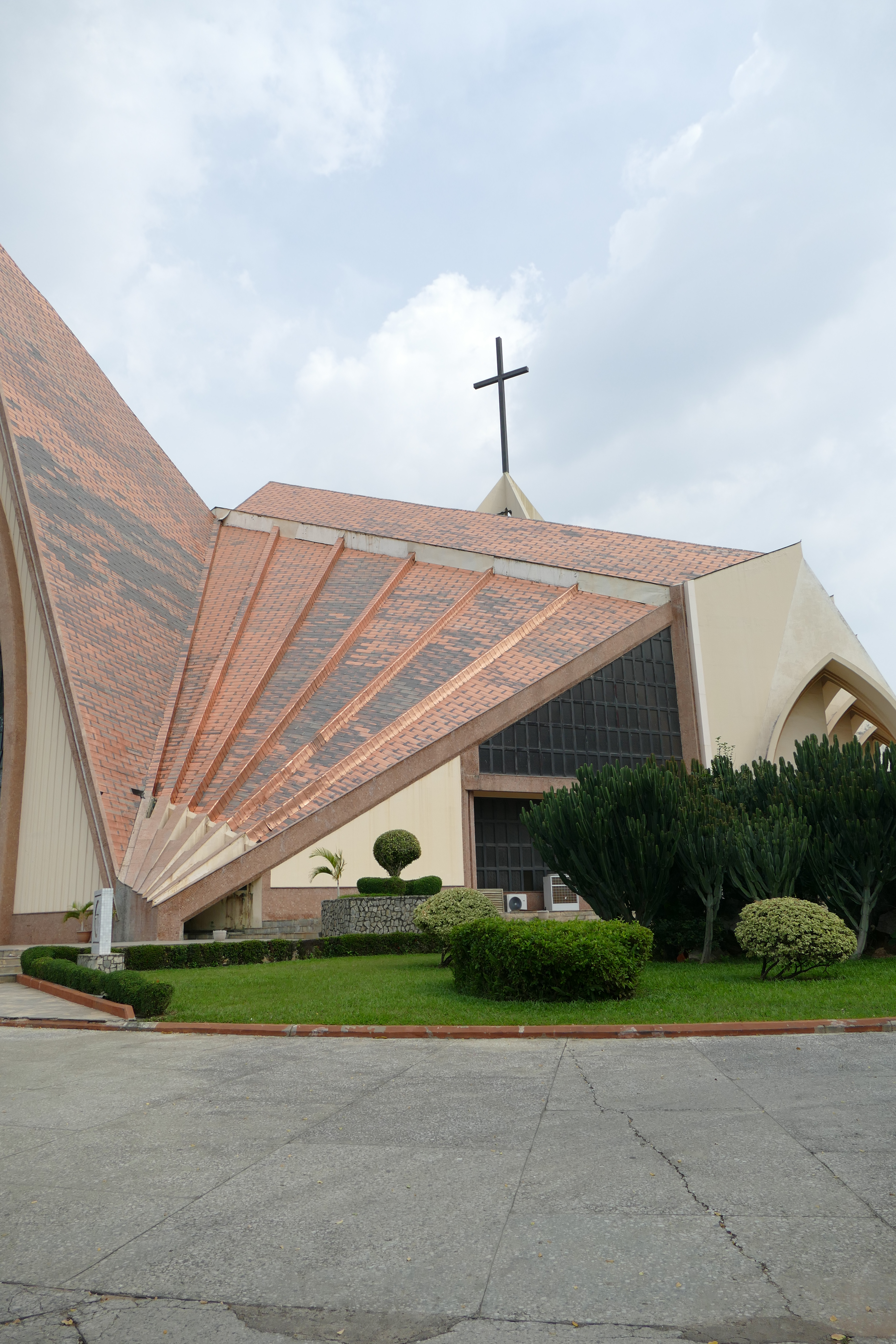
National Church of Nigeria in Abuja

Islamic law has found its way into the heart of many Nigerian state governments, particularly in the northern sect of the country. There is a deep rift between Christians and Muslim in Nigeria, and therefore the government has taken on a hybrid of English common law and Islamic law when dealing with legal issues to appease the diverse national population. Nigeria has the largest population of Christians and Muslims cohabitating in the world. These two religions were introduced in Nigeria largely during the colonial period, and since then, many Africans have merged their own traditional religions with these two institutionalized ones.

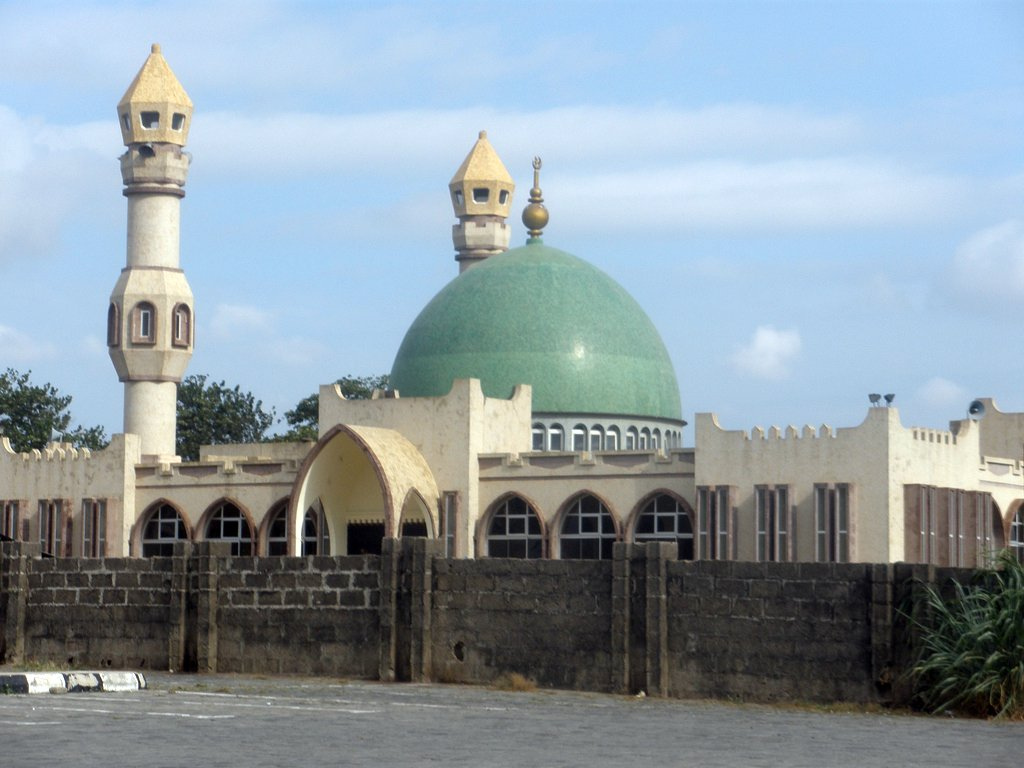
A mosque in Lagos (2009)

Religious tensions between Christians and Muslims in Nigeria has often been used by politicians and other powerful people to incite violence and create fear and chaos among Nigerians. This has led to many citizens questioning why Nigeria remains one federal state, and that it should possibly split along the Christian–Muslim divide. The northern section of the country is largely Islamic, with 12 states that live under Sharia law, while the southern area is mostly Christian. There have been multiple attempts by Nigerian Muslims to add Sharia concepts to the Constitution which has alarmed the Christian population within the nation. Many Christians have deemed the rise of Islam in Nigeria to be dangerous and that it could possibly lead to increased terrorism and instability. This conflict is threatening the stability of Nigeria's democracy, internal structure, and civil society, and many political scientists and Nigerian leaders hope the two religions can engage in a peaceful dialogue that hopefully pacifies both sides.

== Terrorism in Nigeria ==
The greatest terrorist threat in Nigeria is from the organization Boko Haram, and became a prevalent issue in the summer of 2009. Boko Haram is a radical jihadist Islamist terrorist group from the northern sect of Nigeria. It has launched terror attacks that have largely targeted the Nigerian federal government, non-Muslim religious organizations, and average citizens. The rise and growing effects of Boko Haram have been attributed to the instability and fragility of the Nigerian state. They are upset by the government corruption and policy failures of Nigeria, and in particular, the poverty and lack of development of the north of Nigeria which is predominantly Muslim. The impact of Boko Haram on Nigeria has been devastating, over 37,000 individuals have died due to their terrorist attacks since 2011, and over 200,000 Nigerians have been displaced. Boko Haram was responsible for the kidnapping of hundreds of school girls in 2014, triggering the #BringBackOurGirls movement across the globe.

The terrorist organization became a part of ISIS in 2015, drawing concerns to the safety and stability of Nigeria. Many world powers including the United States have contributed military resources to help fight against Boko Haram because Nigeria's oil industry is crucial to the international economy. The Nigerian federal government has launched programs and tactics to combat Boko Haram because of their prevalence. There has also been a recent rise in citizen-created, and in particular youth-led groups that are taking action against Boko Haram to protect themselves and their communities. Both the actions of Boko Haram and the government's efforts to combat terrorism have led to a growing refugee crisis in Nigeria.

== Commonwealth membership ==
Nigeria's membership in the British Commonwealth began in 1960 and was suspended from 1995 to 1999 when the country was under military rule. It was reinstated in 1999 when democracy was established with the Presidential Constitution and Fourth Republic of Nigeria, and it remains a part of the Commonwealth to this day. The Commonwealth Secretariat aims to help Nigeria detect and deter corruption within its federal government. In 2018, they taught numerous government officials and financial officers how to combat and condemn corruption within the nation. The Secretariat's involvement both in governmental and financial affairs created a better system for the transaction of goods and services in Nigeria with less risk of corruption. As of 2017, the Commonwealth has provided Nigeria with policies and resources for Great Britain's exit from the European Union and outlined the possible effects on Commonwealth nations and trade. The Commonwealth Secretariat has helped Nigeria in its natural resource fields such as oil and mining. They have helped with negotiations and the creation of fair bargains. The Commonwealth Secretariat has also provided Nigeria with access to their Connectivity Agenda, which allows nations under the Commonwealth to communicate and exchange ideas and policies to help each other with economic and domestic productivity.

== States of Nigeria ==
Nigeria is made up of 36 states and 1 capital territory: the Federal Capital Territory, Abia, Adamawa, Akwa Ibom, Anambra, Bauchi, Bayelsa, Benue, Borno, Cross River, Delta, Ebonyi, Edo, Ekiti, Enugu, Gombe, Imo, Jigawa, Kaduna, Kano, Katsina, Kebbi, Kogi, Kwara, Lagos, Nasarawa, Niger, Ogun, Ondo, Osun, Oyo, Plateau, Rivers, Sokoto, Taraba, Yobe, and Zamfara state.

=== Local governments ===
Each state is further divided into local government areas (LGAs). These states and their local governments are essential to the function of a federal government because they have a pulse on the local population and can therefore assess the needs of constituents and enact policy or infrastructure that is helpful. They are also important because the federal government has the time and resources to take on national projects and international affairs while local governments can take care of the Nigerians native to their respective states. The devolution of power between the states and the federal government helps the functionality of Nigeria. 774 local governments oversee the collection of local taxes, education, health care, roads, waste, and planning. The local government look after the affairs of the common men and women in the Nigeria society. The creation of local government reform started in 1968, 1970 during the military government but was fully 1976.

== Federal Government's handling of COVID-19 ==
As Africa's most populated nation, the coronavirus pandemic ravaged across Nigeria. Nigeria proved that it could detect, respond to, and prevent the COVID-19 outbreak in a very restricted, poor fashion. Nigeria lacks the resources to conduct the widespread testing the nation needs to keep up with the number of cases surging across the state. Nigeria also lacks the necessary number of other resources for fighting the virus such as hospital workers, rooms, and ventilators.

The federal government's response to the virus was fairly weak and ineffective. Former President Buhari passed numerous lockdowns, mask mandates, and travel bans to decrease the number of cases in the country. However, the lockdowns, mandates, and travel restrictions have led to negative economic effects for a great number of citizens who have lost their jobs and source of income. In response to this, the federal government passed economic stimulus packages to promote important production sectors such as agriculture and oil. The government also passed food assistance measures and cash transfers to aid those in poverty who are going hungry. They also pushed for fundraising efforts to secure funds from donors to support the federal budget and economic sector.

== Military ==
The military of Nigeria has played a major role in the country's history, often seizing control of the country and ruling it for long periods of time. Its last period of rule ended in 1999, following the death of the leader of the previous military junta Sani Abacha in 1998.

Active duty personnel in the three Nigerian armed services totals approximately 76,000. The Nigerian Army, which is the largest of the services, has about 60,000 personnel, deployed between two mechanized infantry divisions, one composite division (airborne and amphibious), the Lagos Garrison Command (a division-size unit), and the Abuja-based Brigade of Guards. The Nigerian Navy (7,000) is equipped with frigates, fast attack craft, corvettes, and coastal patrol boats. The Nigerian Air Force (9,000) flies transports, trainers, helicopters, and fighter aircraft; however, most of their vehicles are currently not operational.

== Foreign relations ==
The current minister of foreign affairs of Nigeria is Yusuf Tuggar. Much of Nigeria's foreign affairs, both during the colonial era and post-independence has relied on oil-production. Nigeria's relationships with both its neighbors in Africa and throughout the world have improved a great deal since it has transitioned from military rule to a democratic state. It is a member of the African Union and sits on that organization's Peace and Security Council. Nigeria is hoping to gain a permanent seat on the UN Security Council in the near future. Despite these achievements, Nigeria continues to face challenges in its foreign relations, such as the fight against terrorism and insurgency in the region, the challenge of migration and human trafficking, and the need to increase economic cooperation and integration with its neighbors.

== Media ==
Nigeria's media scene is characterized by state and private broadcasters, popular international brands like the BBC and CC and more than a 100 national and local print titles state and private broadcasters. Radio and televised media in Nigeria is mostly state-owned by the National Broadcasting Commission. This is often used as a tactic of the government to assert control over and sway public opinion in favor of the incumbent party and his policies. However, most newspaper are privately owned and the internet is not restricted to the public. Given that a majority (70%) of citizens are under 30, it is fitting that mobile news consumption (84%) is more than twice as high as computer consumption (41%), with tablet consumption trailing at 11%.

== See also ==
- Senate of Nigeria
- National Assembly of Nigeria
- List of Nigerian state governors
- Nigerian Civil Service
- States of Nigeria
- Nigerian Prisons Services
- Chief Justice of Nigeria
