= Justices of the Supreme Court of Nigeria =

The Justices of the Supreme Court of Nigeria are members of the Supreme Court of Nigeria composed of the Chief Justice of Nigeria and other justices not more than 21 including the chief justice, appointed by the president on the recommendation of the National Judicial Council, (NJC) and subject to confirmation by the Nigerian Senate. Justices of the Supreme Court must be qualified to practice law in Nigeria, and must have been so qualified for a period not less than fifteen years. Justices of the Supreme Court of Nigeria have a mandatory retirement age of 70 years.

== Recent history ==
In June 2019, when the court had 16 justices, the president wrote the CJN, asking him as the chairman of the National Judicial Council (NJC) to “initiate in earnest the process of appointing additional five Justices of the Supreme Court of Nigeria to make the full complement of Justices of the Supreme Court” as contained in the Nigerian Constitution. After the quarter of 2020, a number of justices retired, making the number of justices to 13 justices and increasing the workload on the bench. The recommendation from the National Judicial Council for the appointment of 8 new judges in 2020 after the confirmation by the Nigerian Senate increased the number to 21 Justices. After the death of Justice Nwali Sylvester Ngwuta, the retirement of Justice Bode Rhodes-Vivour, the death of Justice Samuel Oseji, the retirement of Justice Mary Odili, the retirement of Justice Ejembi Eko, the retirement of Justice Abdu Aboki and the resignation of Chief Justice Ibrahim Tanko Muhammad, it became a total number of 13 Justices in the Supreme Court of Nigeria including the Chief Justice of Nigeria. The death of Justice Chima Nweze in July 2023 and the retirement of Justice Amina Augie and Justice Musa Dattijo Muhammad in September and October 2023 respectively, further reduced the number of Justices to 10.

On 21 December 2023, the Nigerian Senate confirmed the appointment of 11 more Supreme Court justices, bringing the number of justices in the Supreme Court to the maximum constitutional requirement of 21 for the first time since 2020. The 11 justices were sworn in on 26 February 2024.

Following the retirement of Chief Justice Olukayode Ariwoola on 22 August 2024, the number of Justices reduced to 20.

== Current Justices of the Supreme Court ==
Office	Name	Term
Chief Justice	Kudirat Kekere-Ekun	2013–present
Associate Justice	John Inyang Okoro	2013–present
Associate justice	Uwani Musa Abba Aji	2018–present
Associate Justice	M. Lawal Garba	2020–present
Associate Justice	Helen M. Ogunwumiju	2020–present
Associate Justice	I. N. M. Saulawa	2020–present
Associate Justice	Adamu Jauro	2020–present
Associate Justice	Tijjani Abubakar	2020–present
Associate Justice	Emmanuel A. Agim	2020–present
Associate Justice	Haruna Tsammani	2024–present
Associate Justice	Moore Adumein	2024–present
Associate Justice	Jummai Sankey	2024–present
Associate Justice	Chidiebere Uwa	2024–present
Associate Justice	Chioma Nwosu-Iheme	2024–present
Associate Justice	Obande Ogbuinya	2024–present
Associate Justice	Stephen Adah	2024–present
Associate Justice	Habeeb Abiru	2024–present
Associate Justice	Jamilu Tukur	2024–present
Associate Justice	Abubakar Umar	2024–present
Associate Justice	Mohammed Idris	2024–present
