= List of justices of the Nigerian courts of appeals =

This is a list of justices of the Nigerian courts of appeals arranged in alphabetical order. The list also reflect one or more justice of the Supreme Court of Nigeria who had at one time served as justice of the appeallate courts of Nigeria.

== A ==
- A. I. Katsina-Alu
- Ayo Salami
- Akintola Olufemi Eyiwunmi
- Aloma Mariam Mukhtar
- Atanda Fatai Williams
- Abai Ikwechegh

== B ==
- Bode Rhodes-Vivour

== D ==
- Darnley Alexander
- Dan Onuorah Ibekwe
- Dahiru Musdapher

== G ==
- George Sodeinde Sowemimo

== I ==
- Idris Legbo Kutigi
- Ibrahim Tanko Muhammad
- Istifanus Thomas

== J ==
- John Afolabi Fabiyi
- John Taylor

== M ==
- Mahmud Mohammed
- Mohammed Uwais
- Mohammed Bello
- Mustapha Akanbi

== N ==
- Nasir Mamman

== Q ==
Chief Jerry Solomon

== S ==
- Suleiman Galadima
- Salihu Moddibo Alfa Belgore

== T ==
- Taslim Olawale Elias

== U ==
- Umaru Abdullahi

== W ==
- Walter Samuel Nkanu Onnoghen

== Z ==
- Zainab Adamu Bulkachuwa
