= Monica Dongban-Mensem =

Nigerian judge

Monica Bolna'an Dongban-Mensem CFR (born 13 June 1957) is a Nigerian judge. She is the President of the Court of Appeal of Nigeria. Her appointment was confirmed on Thursday, 11 June 2020.

== Life ==
Monica Dongban-Mensem is the daughter of Pa William Shaltuen Mensem, a teacher. She was educated at Ahmadu Bello University, where she gained a LL.B and LL.M. She then studied for a postgraduate diploma at the Institute of Advanced Legal Studies in London.

After her first son, Samson Kwapda’as Dongban, died in a road accident, she founded Kwapda’as Road Safety Demand (KRSD), a road safety organisation.

On 5 March 2020 President Muhammadu Buhari appointed Dongban-Mensem as acting president of the Court of Appeal, after the retirement of Zainab Bulkachuwa. She was sworn in by Tanko Muhammad, Chief Justice of Nigeria, on 6 March 2020. In April 2020 the National Judicial Council recommended her to President Buhari for confirmation as Appeal Court President. The President has extended the appointment of Dongban-Memsem as the acting President of the Appeal Court for further period of three months from June 3, 2020. Her appointment was finally confirmed by the Senate on 11 June 2020.

== Works ==
- The Defendant, 1991.

== Awards ==
In October 2022, a Nigerian national honour of Commander of the Order of the Federal Republic (CFR) was conferred on her by President Muhammadu Buhari.
