= Chima Centus Nweze =

Nigerian jurist (1958–2023)

Justice of the Supreme Court of Nigeria
- In office 29 October 2014 – 30 July 2023

Personal details
- Born: 25 September 1958 Enugu State, Federation of Nigeria
- Died: 30 July 2023 (aged 64)
- Party: Non partisan

Chima Centus Nweze (25 September 1958 – 30 July 2023) was a Nigerian jurist and Justice of the Supreme Court of Nigeria.

== Early life ==
Chima Centus Nweze was born on 25 September 1958, and hailed from Enugu State, eastern Nigeria.

Nweze graduated with an LLB (Hons) from the University of Nigeria, Nsukka in 1983, BL from the Nigerian Law School in 1984, LL.M in 1995, and a PhD in law in 2001 from the University of Nigeria, Nsukka.

== Law career ==
Prior to his appointment as justice of the Supreme Court of Nigeria, he was a Justice of the Nigerian courts of appeal.

Nweze was sworn in on 29 October 2014, by Justice Aloma Mariam Mukhtar, the former Chief Justice of Nigeria.

== Death ==
Chima Centus Nweze died on 30 July 2023, at the age of 64.
