= Nwali Sylvester Ngwuta =

Nigerian jurist (1951–2021)

Justice of the Supreme Court of Nigeria
- In office May 2011 – 7 March 2021

Personal details
- Born: 30 March 1951 Onicha, Ebonyi State, Nigeria
- Died: 7 March 2021 (aged 69)
- Party: Non partisan

Nwali Sylvester Ngwuta, CFR (30 March 1951 – 7 March 2021) was a Nigerian jurist and Justice of the Supreme Court of Nigeria. He served on the Supreme Court from 2011 until his death in 2021.

== Early life ==
Justice Sylvester was born in 1951 in Amofia-Ukawu, Onicha local government area of Ebonyi State, South-Eastern Nigeria.

He obtained a bachelor's degree in Law from Obafemi Awolowo University and was called to the bar, the Nigerian bar in 1978 after he graduated from the Nigerian Law School.

== Law career ==
Justice Sylvester began his law career in 1978 as a state counsel in Benue State ministry of justice, the same year he established his own law firm. In October 1995, he was appointed a Judge of the Abia State High Court. On 22 May 2011, he was appointed to the bench of the Nigerian courts of appeal and in May 2013, he was appointed to the bench of the Supreme Court of Nigeria as Justice.

He presided over the ruling of the Supreme Court that affirmed Olusegun Mimiko as the governor-elect of Ondo State in the May 2013 governorship election. He also presided over the ruling of the Supreme Court that affirmed Kayode Fayemi as the governor-elect of Ekiti State in the June 2013 governorship election and was supported by Justices Ibrahim Tanko Muhammad and Suleiman Galadima. He was arrested by the Department of State Security Services (DSS) on 8 October 2016 on allegations of bribery and corruption. However, the Court of Code Tribunal (CCT) ruled in May 2018 that only the National Judicial Council could determine whether or not Ngwata would face trial. In September 2019, Ngwuta resumed his duties as a Supreme Court Justice after a three-year suspension.

== Membership ==
- Member, Nigerian Bar Association
- Member, International Bar Association
- Member, Nigerian Body of Benchers

== See also ==
- List of people from Ebonyi State
