= Ayo Salami =

Nigerian Jurist

The Honourable Justice Ayo Salami CFR OFR

President of the Nigerian courts of appeal
- In office 2009–2011

Personal details
- Born: 15 October 1943 (age 82) Kwara State, Nigeria
- Party: Non partisian

Ayo Salami, CFR OFR (born 15 October 1943) is a Nigerian jurist and former President of the Nigerian courts of appeal.

== Early life ==
Justice Ayo was born on October 15, 1943, in Ganma, a town in Kwara State, North-Central Nigeria. He obtained the West Africa School Certificate at Provincial Secondary School, Kano in 1963. He received a bachelor's degree in law from Ahmadu Bello University in 1967, the same year he proceeded to the Nigerian Law School and was Call to the bar on June 28, 1968.

== Law career ==
He began his career as a Collector of Customs and Excise Grade II and in 1971, three years after he was called to the Nigerian bar, he got a transferred to North Central State Public Service Commission where he served as State Counsel Grade II. Salami later became the acting Solicitor-General and Permanent Secretary of the Kaduna state Ministry of Justice, Kaduna before he was deployed to his State, Kwara State in 1976 as Senior State Counsel, where he later served as acting Solicitor-General and Permanent Secretary, Ministry of Justice, Ilorin until 1978. He was appointed as Justice if the Court of Appeal. While a justice of that court, he headed the Court of Appeal Rules Committee which had as its members, Justices Akaahs, Galadima and Nweze and Appellate book author, Ibe Ikwechegh. In 2009, he was appointed as President of the Nigerian courts of appeals, to succeed Justice Umaru Abdullahi. In August 2011, the National Judicial Council suspended Justice Salami, sequel to his refusal to apologize to Justice A. I. Katsina-Alu, the former Chief Justice of Nigeria who headed the council's panel that found him to have lied against the council. In addition to the indefinite suspension, the council to Goodluck Ebele Jonathan, the President of the Federal Republic of Nigeria to retired him from the bench. In May 2012, the National Judicial Council reversed its decision and recommended his immediate reinstatement but was disregarded by the Federal Government of Nigeria. Ayo Salami retired from the judiciary on October 15, 2013. He was reappointed from his retirement by the Chief Justice of Nigeria (CJN), Hon. Mr. Justice Walter Samuel Nkanu Onnoghen, to head its 15-member Corruption and Financial Crime Cases Trial Monitoring Committee on 27 September 2017 during the commencement of the 2017–2018 legal year, which he declined.

== See also ==
- List of Justice of the Nigerian courts of appeals
