= Eleojo Eneche =

Nigerian jurist

Hon. Justice Eleojo Enenche

Justice of the Court of Appeal
- Incumbent
- Assumed office 10 July 2024
- Appointed by: Bola Tinubu

Judge of the High Court of the Federal Capital Territory
- In office November 2021 – July 2024
- Appointed by: Muhammadu Buhari

Personal details
- Born: 1974 Kogi State, Nigeria
- Education: Ahmadu Bello University (LL.B)
- Occupation: Jurist

Eleojo Enenche (born 1974) is a Nigerian judge who has served on the Court of Appeal since July 2024. Prior to his elevation, he was a Judge of the High Court of the Federal Capital Territory (FCT) between 2021 and 2024.

== Early life and education ==
Enenche was born in Kaduna State. His early schooling took place at St. Louis Nursery & Primary School in Kano, Labayi International School in Kaduna, and Sacred Heart Primary School, Kaduna. For his secondary education, he attended Federal Government College, Kano, and later Emmanuel Secondary School, Ugbokolo, Benue State.

He studied law at Ahmadu Bello University, Zaria, and was called to the Nigerian Bar in 2001.

== Career ==
Enenche began working in the FCT Judiciary as Legal Officer I from 2002 to 2004. He then joined the Abuja Multi‑Door Courthouse (AMDC), where he served as a Dispute Resolution Officer until 2007, and subsequently as Head of Training and Research from 2007 to 2010.

In 2010, he became Legal Assistant to the Chief Judge of the FCT High Court, and in 2015 he was appointed Assistant Director of Special Duties at the same court.

The National Judicial Council nominated him in 2020, and he was sworn in as a Judge of the High Court of the Federal Capital Territory in November 2021.

In May 2024, he was nominated for promotion to the Court of Appeal. He was formally sworn in by Chief Justice Olukayode Ariwoola on 10 July 2024.
