= Amiru Sanusi =

Nigerian jurist

Justice of the Supreme Court of Nigeria
- In office May 2015 – 3 February 2020

Personal details
- Born: 2 February 1950 (age 76) Funtua, Katsina State, Nigeria

Amiru Sanusi (born 2 February 1950 in Funtua, Nigeria) is an elder statesman,local jurist and a former Justice of the Supreme Court of Nigeria. He was a judge in Katsina State between 1990 and 1998 before being commissioned to the Court of Appeal. Amiru Sanusi was sworn in by the former Chief Justice of Nigeria Justice Mahmud Mohammed in May 2015.

Sanusi has also been honoured with Officer of the Order of the Federal Republic. Sanusi is happily married with children, among his children is Ma'aruf Sanusi who is also a Judge of the katsina state High Court .
