= Stephen Adah =

Nigerian jurist (born 1957)

Stephen Jonah Adah

Justice of the Supreme Court of Nigeria
- Incumbent
- Assumed office 26 February 2024
- Appointed by: Bola Tinubu

Personal details
- Born: 13 June 1957 (age 69) Nigeria
- Education: Ahmadu Bello University; Nigerian Law School
- Occupation: Jurist

Stephen Jonah Adah (born 13 June 1957) is a Nigerian jurist who has served as a Justice of the Supreme Court of Nigeria since February 2024. He previously served on the Federal High Court and the Court of Appeal, and was a member of the Presidential Election Petition Court that heard challenges to the 2023 Nigerian presidential election.

== Early life and education ==
Adah was born on 13 June 1957 and hails from Dekina Local Government Area of Kogi State. He obtained a Bachelor of Laws degree from Ahmadu Bello University, Zaria, in 1981 and was called to the Nigerian Bar in 1982 after attending the Nigerian Law School in Lagos.

== Judicial career ==
Adah was appointed a judge of the Federal High Court on 12 November 1998, a position he held for fourteen years. He was elevated to the Court of Appeal on 5 November 2012 and later became Presiding Justice of the Asaba Division of that court.

In December 2020 Adah presided over a three-member Court of Appeal panel which set aside charges that had been brought against Sambo Dasuki, a former National Security Adviser, by the Federal High Court in Abuja.

Adah was one of five justices named in May 2023 to the Presidential Election Petition Court, chaired by Haruna Simon Tsammani, which heard the petitions filed against the outcome of the 2023 presidential election. The court dismissed the petitions in September 2023.

Adah was among eleven justices of the Court of Appeal recommended for elevation to the Supreme Court by the National Judicial Council at its meeting of 6 December 2023. The Senate confirmed the appointments on 21 December 2023, and he was sworn in by Chief Justice Olukayode Ariwoola on 26 February 2024.

== See also ==
- Supreme Court of Nigeria
- 2023 Nigerian presidential election
