= Akintola (name) =

Nigerian Yoruba Names

- Gender: Male
- Language: Yoruba

Origin
- Origin: Nigerian
- Meaning: Bravery measures up to wealth
- Region of origin: South-West Nigeria

Akíntọ́lá is a Nigerian surname of Yoruba origin which means "Bravery measures up to wealth". Diminutive variants of the name includes "Akin" "Tola" and "Ola".

== Notable people bearing the name ==
- Ladoke Akintola, Nigerian politician
- Bimbo Akintola, Nigerian actress
- Akintola Williams, Nigerian accountant
- Babajide David (Babajide David Akintola), professional footballer
- Alaba Akintola, Nigerian athlete
- Akintola Olufemi Eyiwunmi, jurist
- Akintola Hanif, photographer
