= Tanko Muhammad =

Chief Justice of Nigeria from 2019 to 2022

The Honourable Muhammad Tanko GCON

Chief Justice of Nigeria
- In office 25 January 2019 – 27 June 2022
- Preceded by: Walter Onnoghen
- Succeeded by: Olukayode Ariwoola

Justice of the Supreme Court of Nigeria
- In office 7 January 2007 – 27 June 2022

Personal details
- Born: Ibrahim Muhammad Tanko; 31 December 1953 Giade, Northern Region, Colony and Protectorate of Nigeria (now Bauchi State, Nigeria)
- Died: 16 December 2025 (aged 71) Saudi Arabia

Ibrahim Muhammad Tanko GCON (31 December 1953 – 16 December 2025) was a Nigerian jurist, who served as a Justice of the Supreme Court of Nigeria from 2006 to 2022 and as Chief Justice of Nigeria from 2019 until his resignation in June 2022. He was formerly a Justice of the Nigerian Courts of Appeal.

== Early life and education ==
Tanko was born on 31 December 1953 in Giade, Bauchi State, Nigeria. Tanko was a Muslim. After graduating from Government Secondary School in Azare in 1973, he earned an LL.B. degree in Islamic law in 1980, LL.M. in 1985 and Ph.D. in law in 1998, all from Ahmadu Bello University.

== Career ==
Tanko began his career in 1982, after he was called to the bar in 1981, the same year he graduated from the Nigerian Law School.

In 1989, he was appointed Chief Magistrate of the High Court of the Federal Capital Territory, a position he held until 1991 when he became a Judge at the Sharia Court of Appeal in Bauchi State. He served two years before he got appointed as Justice of the Nigerian courts of appeal in 1993. He held this position for 13 years before he was appointed to the bench of the Supreme Court of Nigeria in 2006 but was sworn in on 7 January 2007. On Thursday 11 July 2019, Tanko was nominated by President Muhammadu Buhari as substantive CJN after the National Judicial Council (NJC) recommended him to the president.

On 26 June 2022, Tanko resigned as the Chief Justice of Nigeria citing ill health as the reason for his decision.

== Controversies ==
=== Corruption ===
In a report by Peoples Gazette on 19 June 2022, Tanko was accused of diverting budgetary allocation of the Judiciary and denying Justices of the Supreme Court basic working tools and training. The leaked internal memo was signed by 14 Justices of the Supreme Court, an act described by pundits as unprecedented. Tanko was also accused of ferrying family members on International trips while neglecting Justices of the Supreme Court's annual retreat.

A few days after the reports, Tanko resigned his position as the Chief Justice of Nigeria citing health issues. However, reports from news platforms in Nigeria debunk this, stating that Tanko was forced out of service by the country's secret police over the allegations of corruption and misappropriation.

== Death ==
On 16 December 2025, Tanko died in a hospital in Saudi Arabia. He was 71. His death was confirmed by the Nigerian Association of Muslim Law Students (NAMLAS).

President Bola Tinubu, through a statement delivered by his adviser on information and strategy Bayo Onanuga, described Tanko as "an eminent jurist whose life was devoted to the cause of justice and the strengthening of Nigeria's judiciary". The Chief Justice of Nigeria Kudirat Kekere-Ekun expressed her condolence to the President, family of Tanko and the government of Bauchi, while noting that Tanko "would be remembered for his good works while on earth". Acknowledging his tenure as a former Chief Justice of Nigeria and Chairman of the National Judicial Council (NJC), Ahmed Saleh the secretary of NJC, in a statement, mourned the former CJN while pointing out how death has taken a festive celebration of Tanko's upcoming 72nd birthday. The Supreme Court of Nigeria also noted his "dedication to the rule of law, judicial independence, and the fair administration of justice during his tenure". Senator Shehu Umar Buba summarised Tanko's legacy as rooted in "hard work, honesty, and dedication".

The Nigerian Bar Association (NBA), through the chairman Afam Osigwe, praised Tanko's service to the judiciary. The Governor of Bauchi State Bala Mohammed expressed his condolences to the family. He described him as "a venerable jurist whose life and career exemplified dedication to duty, integrity in service, and steadfast commitment to the rule of law".

== Awards ==
In October 2022, a Nigerian national honour of Grand Commander of the Order of the Niger (GCON) was conferred on him by President Muhammadu Buhari.

== See also ==
- List of justices of the Nigerian courts of appeals
