= Zainab Adamu Bulkachuwa =

Nigerian judge

President of the Nigerian courts of appeals
- In office 17 April 2014 – 6 March 2020

Personal details
- Born: 6 March 1950 (age 76) Gombe State, Nigeria
- Party: Non partisian

Zainab Adamu Bulkachuwa, OFR (born March 1950) is a Nigerian judge and former President of the Nigerian courts of appeal.

She is the first female to be the President of the Nigerian court of appeal.

== Early life ==
Justice Zainab Adamu Bulkacha OFR (Rtd) was born on 6 March 1950 to Alhaji Abubakar Gidado El-Nafaty and Hajiya Aishatu Dudu El-Nafaty. An indigene of Nafada Local Government Area of Gombe State.

== Education ==
She began her Primary Education at Tudun Wada Primary School in Kaduna and also attended Senior Primary School, in Kaduna - Kaduna State between 1957 in 1963, where she acquired her First School Leaving Certificate in 1963. She later enrolled at Queen Elizabeth School in Ilorin - Kwara State where she obtained her West African School Certificate (WASC) in 1968. Honourable Justice Zainab Bulkachuwa proceeded to Abdullahi Bayero College Kano for her GCE ‘A’ Levels between 1971 and 1972 and in 1975 she obtained her LL.B (Hons) from Ahmadu Bello University, Zaria, Kaduna State. She then proceeded to the Nigerian Law School Bwari - Federal Capital Territory, Abuja between 1975 and 1976.

== Marital life ==
The former president court of appeal justice Zainab has married twice after the death of her first husband as she disclosed at valedictory court session done in her honour by the River state Governor Nyesom Wike. She is currently married to a former senator who is also a member of APC, Senator Adamu Muhammad bulkachukwu Justice Zainab's eldest son, Aliyu Haidar Abubakar is a youth activist based in Abuja contested for Gombe Governorship election in 2018

== Call to the bar ==
She was Call to the bar in 1976 and was appointed to the bench of the Nigerian courts of appeals as Justice in 1998. Prior to that appointment, she was a Judge at the High Court of Bauchi State. She presided over the Sokoto State governorship election petition of 2007 and the suit in which Timipre Sylva's petition challenged the nomination of Seriake Dickson as the State flag-bearer of the Peoples' Democratic Party, a case that was dismissed by the Supreme Court of Nigeria. On April 17, 2014, she was appointed as the first female president of the Nigerian courts of appeals by President Goodluck Ebele Jonathan, sworn in by Aloma Mariam Mukhtar, a former chief justice of Nigeria and who coincidentally is first female chief justice of the Federal Republic of Nigeria.

== Membership ==
- Member, Nigerian Bar Association
- Member, International Bar Association
- Member, Nigerian Body of Benchers

== Retirement ==
Zainab Adamu Bulkachuwa retired from active service on her 70th birthday, 6 March 2020 and a Valedictory Court Session In her Honor was held on the 5th of March 2020
