= John Afolabi Fabiyi =

Nigerian jurist

Justice of the Supreme Court of Nigeria
- In office 2009 – 25 November 2015

Personal details
- Born: 25 November 1945 (age 80) Kogi State, Nigeria
- Party: Non partisian

John Afolabi Fabiyi, CON (born 25 November 1945) is a Nigerian jurist and former Justice of the Supreme Court of Nigeria. He was formerly a Justice of the Nigerian courts of appeal.

== Early life ==
Justice Fabiyi was born on November 25, 1945, in Kogi State, North-Central Nigeria. In 1969, he received a bachelor's degree in Law from Ahmadu Bello University and was Call to the bar in 1970 after he graduated from the Nigerian Law School.

== Law career ==
He began his career at Noel Gery & Co, a law firm in Kano State before he joined the Kwara State Judiciary as Magistrate and rose to the position of High Court Judge in the same state. In 1994, he was transferred to Anambra State where he served as Chairman of Election petition tribunal for four years. In 1998, he was appointed to the bench of the Nigerian courts of appeal as Justice and in 2006, rose to the position of Judge of the Court of Appeal in Ibadan. He served in that capacity for three years before he was appointed to the bench of the Supreme Court of Nigeria in 2009 as Justice, the same year he bagged a National honour, Commander of Order of the Niger, awarded by the Federal Government of Nigeria, decorated by Goodluck Ebele Jonathan, the President of the Federal Republic of Nigeria. Fabiyi presided over the ruling of the Supreme Court in which Chief Bode George was discharged and acquitted of the fraud charges leveled against him by the Economic and Financial Crimes Commission. He also presided over the ruling of the Supreme Court that affirmed Ayodele Fayose as the governor elect of Ekiti State in the June 21, 2014, governorship election.

He retired from the court on 25 November 2015 after reaching the mandatory retirement age of 70.

== See also ==
- List of Justice of the Nigerian courts of appeals
