= Umaru Abdullahi =

Nigerian judge

President of the Nigerian courts of appeals
- In office 1999–2009

Personal details
- Born: 30 November 1939
- Party: Non partisian

Umaru Abdullahi, CON (born November 30, 1939) is a Nigerian Jurist and former President of the Nigerian courts of appeals.

== Law career ==
Justice Umaru was called to the English Bar in November 1966 and to the Nigeria Bar in 1968, and was appointed to the bench of the Nigerian courts of appeal in 1983 as Justice. In 1987, he got a transfer to Kastina State to assist in setting up of the state judiciary and three years later, he was appointed as President of the Nigerian courts of appeals, a position he held for ten years, between 1999 and 2009 and was succeeded by Justice Ayo Salami. A biography has been written about him titled, 'Once Upon Umaru' by Ibe Ikwechegh. Justice Abdullahi holds the prestigious title of Walin Hausa .

== See also ==
- List of Justice of the Nigerian courts of appeals
