= Ladosu Ladapo =

The Honourable Chief Ladosu Ladapo SAN
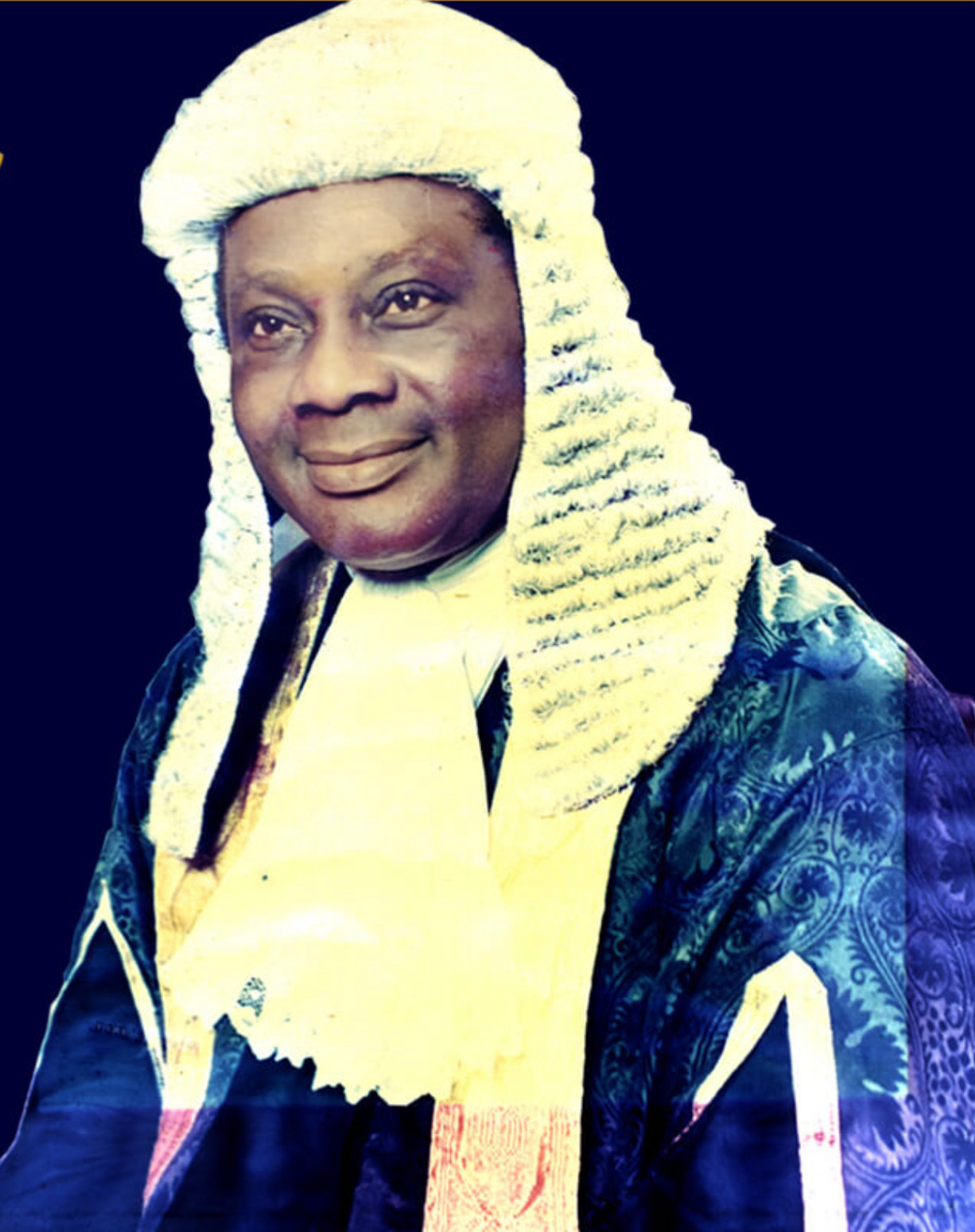

Commissioner for Economic Planning and Reconstruction Western State (Nigeria)
- In office 1971–1973
- Governor: Oluwole Rotimi

Commissioner for Works and Transport Western State (Nigeria)
- In office 1973–1975

Personal details
- Born: Ladosu Ladapo; 17 November 1929 Ibadan, British Nigeria
- Died: 24 June 2003 (aged 73) Ibadan, Oyo state
- Spouse: Cecilia Olapeju Ladapo
- Relations: Laduntan Oyekanmi, Freddie Ladapo (Nephew), Joseph Ladapo (Nephew)
- Education: University of London
- Profession: Lawyer, Administrator

Chief Ladosu Ladapo SAN (November 17, 1929 – June 24, 2003) was a notable Nigerian jurist and politician. He was a scion of the Ladapo family of Abebi, Ibadan. Ladapo was widely regarded as one of the preeminent leaders of the Nigerian legal profession. He served as Commissioner for Economic Planning and Reconstruction and Commissioner for Works and Transport between 1971 and 1975 in the then Western State (Nigeria)

In 1969, Ladapo founded a distinguished law firm, which later became notable for employing Justice Olukayode Ariwoola, the future Chief Justice of Nigeria, who worked there between 1988 and 1989, during the early stages of his legal career. Ladapo became a Senior Advocate of Nigeria on September 9, 1985. He served as Chairman of the Nigerian Bar Association, Ibadan chapter, between 1978 and 1980. Chief Ladosu Ladapo died on the 24th of June 2003 after a brief illness at the University College Hospital, Ibadan

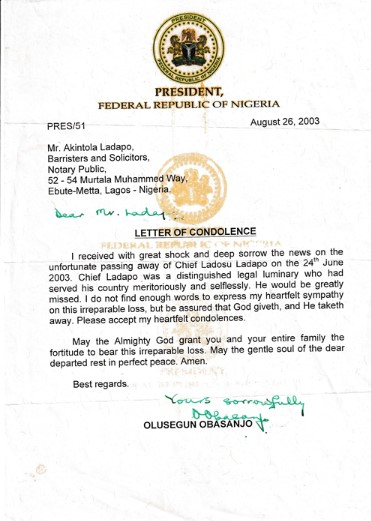
Condolence letter from President Olusegun Obasanjo
