= Haruna Tsammani =

Nigerian jurist (born 1959)

Haruna Simon Tsammani

Justice of the Supreme Court of Nigeria
- Incumbent
- Assumed office 26 February 2024
- Appointed by: Bola Tinubu

Personal details
- Born: 23 November 1959 (age 66) Nigeria
- Education: Ahmadu Bello University; Nigerian Law School
- Occupation: Jurist

Haruna Simon Tsammani (born 23 November 1959) is a Nigerian jurist who has served as a Justice of the Supreme Court of Nigeria since February 2024. He previously sat on the Court of Appeal, where in 2023 he chaired the Presidential Election Petition Court that heard the challenges to the election of President Bola Tinubu.

== Early life and education ==
Tsammani was born on 23 November 1959 and is a native of Tafawa Balewa Local Government Area of Bauchi State. He obtained a Bachelor of Laws degree from Ahmadu Bello University, Zaria, in 1982 and attended the Nigerian Law School in Lagos, being called to the Nigerian Bar in 1983.

== Legal and judicial career ==
Tsammani began practice in 1983 as a pupil state counsel in the Bauchi State Ministry of Justice, and later served as Director of Public Prosecutions in the Gombe State Ministry of Justice.

He was appointed a judge of the High Court of Bauchi State on 17 September 1998 and was elevated to the Court of Appeal on 16 July 2010, later ranking eleventh on that court's seniority list.

In 2021 he chaired the three-member Court of Appeal panel that restrained the Rivers State and Lagos State governments from collecting value-added tax, a ruling that favoured the Federal Inland Revenue Service and attracted considerable public debate.

== Presidential Election Petition Court, 2023 ==
In May 2023 Tsammani was named to chair the five-member Presidential Election Petition Court constituted to hear petitions against the outcome of the 2023 Nigerian presidential election; the other members were Stephen Adah, Monsurat Bolaji-Yusuf, Boluokuromo Ugo and Abba Mohammed.

At the court's inaugural sitting Tsammani asked counsel to avoid sensational comments and to address the substance of the petitions rather than procedural technicalities, and said the body should be referred to as a court rather than a tribunal.

The court delivered judgment on 6 September 2023 after a sitting lasting some thirteen hours, unanimously dismissing the consolidated petitions brought by Atiku Abubakar of the Peoples Democratic Party, Peter Obi of the Labour Party and the Allied Peoples Movement, and affirming Tinubu's return by the Independent National Electoral Commission.

Among its findings, the court held that the Federal Capital Territory was not to be treated differently from the states for the purpose of the constitutional vote requirement, and that the electoral commission was at liberty to determine its mode of transmitting results.

The judgment was appealed. In October 2023 a seven-member panel of the Supreme Court led by Justice Inyang Okoro dismissed the appeals of Atiku Abubakar and Peter Obi and affirmed the decision of the court below.

== Supreme Court ==
In February 2024 the Federal Judicial Service Commission listed Tsammani, described as chairman of the by then defunct Presidential Election Petitions Court, among twenty-two Court of Appeal justices nominated for elevation to the Supreme Court. The National Judicial Council had recommended eleven justices, including Tsammani, at its meeting of 6 December 2023.

The Senate confirmed the appointments on 21 December 2023. Tsammani was sworn in by Chief Justice Olukayode Ariwoola on 26 February 2024. The appointments brought the Supreme Court to its full constitutional complement of twenty-one justices.

== See also ==
- Supreme Court of Nigeria
- 2023 Nigerian presidential election
