= Suleiman Galadima =

Justice of the Supreme Court of Nigeria

Justice of the Supreme Court of Nigeria

Personal details
- Born: October 1946 (age 79) Nasarawa State, Nigeria
- Party: Non partisian

Suleiman Galadima CFR (born October 1946) is a Nigerian jurist and Justice of the Supreme Court of Nigeria.

== Early life ==
Justice Galadima was born in October 1946 in Nasarawa State, Northern Nigeria. He attended Government College Keffi where he obtained the West Africa School Certificate in 1965 before he proceeded to Ahmadu Bello University where he obtained a bachelor's degree in Law in 1977 and was Call to the bar after he graduated from the Nigerian Law School in 1978. He later received a master's degree in law from the University of Jos in 1985.

== Law career ==
He joined the Anambra State Judiciary as Magistrate in July 1988 and in 1990, he was appointed as Attorney General and the Commission for Justice, Plateau state. In May 1991, he became the High Court Judge of Plateau State. At the creation of Nasarawa State in 1996, he was appointed as Chief Judge of the State. On December 9, 1998, he was appointed to the bench of the Nigerian courts of appeal as Justice. In August 2010, he was appointed to the bench of the Supreme Court of Nigeria as Justice, alongside Justice Bode Rhodes-Vivour.

== See also ==
- List of Justice of the Nigerian courts of appeals
