= President of the Nigerian courts of appeal =

Head of the Nigerian courts of appeal

- Incumbent; Monica Dongban-Mensem since June 11, 2020
- Style: Honorable
- Member of: National Judicial Council
- Seat: 63
- Appointer: President of Nigeria
- Term length: 4 years renewable

The President of the Nigerian courts of appeal is the head of the Nigerian courts of appeal. The incumbent president is Justice Monica Dongban-Mensem, she was confirmed by the Senate on 11 June 2020 after a report from the Judiciary, Human Right and Legal Matters Committee at the Senate .

== Appointment ==
The appointed justice is usually a serving justice of the court of appeal or the Supreme Court of Nigeria and are often recommended by the National Judicial Council to the President of Nigeria, who will send the names to the Senate for confirmation. The appointed justices are usually sworn in by the Chief Justice of Nigeria after confirmation by the Senate, the upper chamber of the National Assembly.
