= Paul Adamu Galumje =

Paul Adamu Galumje (born April 21, 1950, in Didan Village of Taraba State) is a Nigerian jurist and Justice of the Supreme Court of Nigeria.
