= Moore Adumein =

Moore Aseimo Abraham Adumein (born 1964) is a Nigerian jurist who has served as a Justice of the Supreme Court of Nigeria since February 2024. He previously sat on the Court of Appeal, where he was Presiding Justice of the Ibadan and Yola divisions.

== Early life and career ==
Adumein was born in 1964 and is from Bayelsa State. He was called to the Nigerian Bar in 1984, and in 2004 obtained a postgraduate certificate in corruption studies from the University of Hong Kong.

Adumein was appointed a judge of the High Court of Bayelsa State in the 2001. He was appointed to the Court of Appeal in 2010, serving in several divisions, and became Presiding Justice first of the Ibadan Division and later of the Yola Division.

== Supreme Court ==
The National Judicial Council recommended Adumein for the Supreme Court at its meeting of 6 December 2023, one of eleven Court of Appeal justices put forward. The Senate confirmed the appointments on 21 December 2023, and he was sworn in by Chief Justice Olukayode Ariwoola on 26 February 2024, bringing the court to its full complement of 21 justices.

== See also ==
- Supreme Court of Nigeria
- Bayelsa State Judiciary
