= Akintola Olufemi Eyiwunmi =

Nigerian jurist

- Born: May 27, 1936; Lagos State, Nigeria
- Died: June 20, 2008 (aged 72)
- Occupations: jurist; solicitor; activist

Akintola Olufemi Eyiwunmi, CON (May 27, 1936 – June 20, 2008) was a Nigerian jurist, former judge at the High Court of Lagos State and Justice of the Supreme Court of Nigeria.

== Early life ==
Justice Eyiwunmi was born in May 1936 in Lagos State, Southwestern Nigeria. He attended CMS Grammar School and the Methodist Boys' High School, Lagos where he obtained the West Africa School Certificate in 1948. In 1957, he proceeded to the University of Hull where he obtained a bachelor's degree in Law in July 1961.

== Law career ==
After he was called to the English bar, he returned to Nigeria as law clerk in the Supreme Court of Nigeria in 1962. In 1963, he joined the Oyo State Ministry of Justice at Ibadan where he bagged a scholarship award to study for an LL.M. in International Air and Space Law at McGill University in Canada, which he completed in 1964. He returned to the Ministry of Justice, Ibadan in 1964 and was appointed a Crown Counsel at the Director of Public Prosecutions's office and was deployed to Lagos State in 1967, the same year the state was established.

In 1974, he was appointed director of Public Prosecution, Lagos State and later Solicitor General in 1978, a position he held till May 23, 1979, when he was appointed to the bench of the High Court of Lagos State as a Judge and in 1988, he became a Justice at the courts of appeals. On November 26, 1998, he was appointed to the bench of the Supreme Court of Nigeria, where he retired on May 27, 2006, as Justice.

On March 15, 2006, before his retirement, he served as Chairman of the Presidential Commission on Reform of the Administration of Justice System in Nigeria. In 2008, two years after his retirement, he became a member of the Nigerian Police Service Commission, a position he held until his demise on June 20, 2008.

== See also ==
- List of Justice of the Nigerian courts of appeals
