= Walter Onnoghen =

Chief Justice of Nigeria from 2017 to 2019

Walter Samuel Nkanu Onnoghen GCON

Chief Justice of Nigeria
- In office 7 March 2017 – 25 January 2019
- Nominated by: Yemi Osinbajo (as Acting President)
- Preceded by: Mahmud Mohammed
- Succeeded by: Ibrahim Tanko Muhammad

Associate Justice of the Supreme Court of Nigeria
- In office 2005 – 25 January 2019
- Nominated by: Olusegun Obasanjo

Personal details
- Born: 22 December 1950 (age 75) Okurike Town, Biase, Southern Region, British Nigeria (now Cross River, Nigeria)
- Spouse: Nkoyo Walter-Onnoghen
- Children: 4
- Parent: Nkanu Onnoghen (father)
- Education: University of Ghana (Bachelor of Laws); Nigerian Law School
- Occupation: Supreme Court justice

Walter Samuel Nkanu Onnoghen GCON (born 22 December 1950) is a Nigerian jurist who served as Chief Justice of Nigeria from 2017 to 2019. Before joining the Supreme Court, he was a judge in Cross River State and a justice of the Court of Appeal.

== Early life and education ==
Walter Onnoghen was born on the 22 December 1950 at Okurike Town, Biase Local Government Area of Cross Rivers State.

Onnoghen had his primary school education at the Presbyterian Primary School, Okurike Town between 1959 and 1965. From there, he proceeded to Accra in Ghana, obtaining his West African Examination Council (WAEC) O-Level certificate from Odorgonno Senior High School between 1967 and 1972, and his WAEC (A-Levels) at Accra Academy between 1972 and 1974. He graduated from the University of Ghana at Legon, Ghana in 1977 and from the Nigerian Law School in Lagos in 1978.

== Career ==
Before his appointment as the Chief Justice of the Federation, he worked with the Ministry of Justice, Ikeja, Lagos, Ogun State between 1978 and 1979, as the Pupil State Counsel. When he left Ministry of Justice, he went to partner in the Law firm of Effiom Ekong & Company, Calabar between 1979 – 1988. He later became the Principal Partner/Head of Chamber of Walter Onnoghen & Associates, Calabar from the period of 1988 – 1989.

Between 1989 – 1998, he was a High Court Judge of Cross Rivers State Judiciary. During his time as the High Court Judge of Cross Rivers State Judiciary he was made the Chairman of Cross Rivers State Armed Robbery and Firm Arms Tribunal and he held the post for 3 years between 1990 – 1993. Sometime in 1996 while still holding the post of High Court Judge of Cross Rivers State Judiciary, he was appointed the Chairman, Judicial Enquiry into the Crisis between Students of the University of Calabar and Obufa Esuk Orok Community, Calabar. In 1998, he was the Chairman, Failed Bank Tribunal, Ibadan Zone. Between the period of 1992 to 2004, he served as the Judge, High Court of Rivers State while from 1998 to 2005 he served as the Justice of the Court of Appeal.

In February 2016, Justice Onnoghen led a seven-man panel of Justices of the apex court who reviewed and upheld the death sentence of Chukwuemeka Ezeugo (aka Rev. King) of the Christian Praying Assembly. In 2007, Justice Onnoghen played a huge role in 2007 election which saw the Late Umaru Yar’adua as President of the federal republic of Nigeria. He had a dissenting judgment that indeed annulled the presidential election. His position was however a minority judgment.

== Appointment as CJN ==
After being nominated as the Chief Justice of the Supreme Court of Nigeria by the Acting President, Professor Yemi Osinbajo, he was confirmed by the Senate on 1 March 2017, and sworn in on 7 March 2017.

== Suspension as CJN ==
Onnoghen's trials started when a petition was filed by the civil rights group at the Code of Conduct Bureau (CCB) alleging that he owns ” sundry accounts primarily funded through cash deposits made by himself up to as recently as 10 August 2016, which appear to have been run in a manner inconsistent with financial transparency and the code of conduct for public officials.” The allegations are listed here.

The trial commenced January 14, 2019 at Code of Conduct Tribunal but Onnoghen was absent. It was then adjourned to the following week because Onnoghen faulted the summons procedure. The next hearing was slated for January 22, 2019 but he failed to show up in court again. Following his absence again, President Muhammadu Buhari suspended him 26 January and appointed Tanko Ibrahim as acting Chief Justice of Nigeria.

His office was thereafter sealed by the police and members of the National Interest Defenders and Lawyers protested at the entrance of the National Secretariat of the Nigerian Bar Association. His suspension caused a lot of uproar from political stakeholders, lawyers and even gained international prominence from International bodies. Atiku described his suspension as ‘Dictatorship Taken Too Far'. Minister of Information, Lai Mohammed, accused those criticizing President Buhari over Onnoghen suspension as hypocrites.

On 28 January 2019, the Code of Conduct Tribunal adjourned his trial indefinitely.

== Conviction as CJN ==
Onnoghen was convicted by the Code of Conduct Tribunal on Thursday April 18, 2019 for false assets declaration, With o over five accounts undeclared and he was unable to account for them. CCT rules that he is banned from holding public office for 10 years. President Buhari received Onoghen's voluntary resignation letter which is effective from May 28, 2019.

After an initial opposition to Buhari's acceptance of Onoghen's retirement, the National Judicial Commission stated that Onnoghen's retirement was in Nigeria's best interest.

In November 2024, he was discharged and acquitted by the Court of Appeal in Abuja, overturning his 2019 conviction for false asset declaration. The decision came after Onnoghen appealed the ruling of the Code of Conduct Tribunal (CCT), which had found him guilty on six counts of false asset declaration and ordered his removal from office.

The appeal court's judgment, delivered by Justice Abba Bello Mohammed, held that the CCT lacked jurisdiction to preside over the case without consulting the National Judicial Council (NJC). Additionally, the court ordered the immediate unfreezing of Onnoghen's four bank accounts, which had been frozen under the previous ruling.
