= Amina Augie =

Nigerian Jurist (born 1953)

The Honourable Amina Augie

Justice of the Supreme Court of Nigeria
- In office 2016–2023

Personal details
- Born: Amina Adamu Augie; 3 September 1953 (age 73) Kebbi State, Nigeria
- Party: Non partisian

Amina Adamu Augie (born 3 September 1953) is a Nigerian jurist who has served as a Justice of the Supreme Court of Nigeria since November 7, 2016. She is the sixth woman to be appointed to the nation's highest court.

== Early life and educational background ==
Augie was born on 3 September 1953, in Lagos, Nigeria. She has eight siblings and hails from Kebbi State in North West Nigeria. Between 1958 and 1971, she received primary and secondary education in schools including Abadina School, Ibadan; Hope Waddell Primary School, Calabar; Holy Rosary Primary School, Enugu and in Kaduna at Queen Amina College from 1969 to 1971, all in Nigeria.

After her early education, Augie studied at the University of Ife, Ile-Ife, from 1972 to 1977 where she earned her LLB. She then attended the Nigerian Law School and became a barrister and solicitor of the Federal Republic of Nigeria in 1978. She later enrolled at the University of Lagos to obtain her LLM between 1986 and 1987 in criminology.
