= Ejembi Eko =

Nigerian supreme court jurist

Ejembi Eko (born 23 May 1952 Benue State, Nigeria) is a Nigerian jurist and former Justice of the Supreme Court of Nigeria.
