= Eunice Atuejide =

Nigerian businesswoman, lawyer, and politician (born 1978)

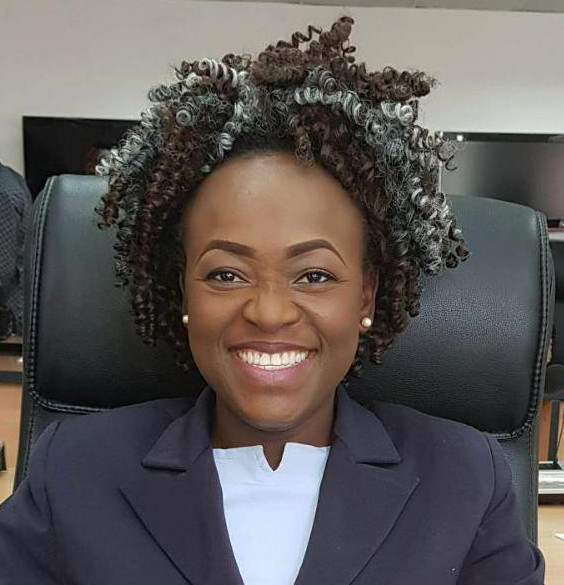

National Chairman of the National Interest Party.
- Incumbent
- Assumed office 2017

Personal details
- Born: 16 August 1978 (age 48)
- Party: National Interest Party (Nigeria)

Eunice Uche Julian Atuejide // (born 16 August 1978) is a Nigerian businesswoman, lawyer, and politician. She is best known for founding the National Interest Party (NIP) and also being the 2019 Nigeria Presidential candidate for the National Interest Party (NIP).

== Early life and education ==
Atuejide was born and raised in Lagos State, Nigeria, although her family originates from Enugu State. She is best known for founding the youth led, technology driven political party known as the National Interest Party (NIP) in Nigeria. She attended Onike Girls Primary School in Lagos, spent one year in the affiliated secondary school before transferring to Reagan Memorial Girls Secondary School, also in Lagos. She moved to University of Ibadan to study Agricultural Economics.

Atuejide participated in Taekwondo throughout her secondary and tertiary education and was among the team that represented the University of Ibadan at NUGA games from 1996 to 1999. She achieved the black belt 1st Dan in 2005 with BUDO Taekwondo Club in Siegen Germany.

Atuejide dropped out of Agricultural Economics at the University of Ibadan and took the Diploma in French Language at the Institut Internationale d’Etudes Française, in Université Marc Bloch, Strasbourg, France. There, she met her first husband Frank Becker and moved to Germany. She did the Diploma in German Language at the Sprahenschule Siegerland. She took the Deutsche Sprachprüfung für den Hochschulzugang (DSH) and enrolled at the University of Siegen, where she studied Business Administration.

Atuejide took the Diploma in Film Making and Acting at the New York Film Academy and Sally Johnson's Studios respectively, both in New York City, USA. After seven years making and promoting Nigerian movies and while raising her family, she went back to school to study law. She completed the Graduate Diploma in Law, the Graduate LLB, the Legal Practice Course, and the LLM in Professional Legal Practice at BPP University, London, United Kingdom. She then moved back to Nigeria where she completed the professional training programme required for enrolment as a Barrister and Solicitor of the Supreme Court of Nigeria.

== Career ==
As a lawyer, Atuejide practices in both Nigeria and the United Kingdom. As a businesswoman, she is involved with IT Consultancy including website development and management for SMEs and charities. She also sources funding for businesses in Europe and infrastructure projects in Africa, Latin America and Asia.

Atuejide's interest in politics was piqued while she was at the Nigerian Law School in Abuja. She pulled together her colleagues at the law school who shared similar political ideals with her, and they together set out on the journey to form a political party. This resulted in the formation and registration of the National Interest Party (NIP) in 2018.
