= Ralph Molyneux Combe =

British barrister and colonial judge

Sir Ralph Molyneux Combe (2 December 1872 – 16 February 1946) was a British barrister and colonial judge.

The son of Major-General J. J. Combe, he was educated at Haileybury College and Exeter College, Oxford, from which he graduated in 1894, and was called to the bar by the Inner Temple in 1897. He was appointed Crown Advocate of British East Africa in 1905 and Attorney-General of the Protectorate in 1912. He was appointed Attorney-General of Nigeria in 1914 and Chief Justice of Nigeria in 1918, serving in this post until his retirement in 1929.

Combe was knighted in the 1920 New Year Honours.
