= John Inyang Okoro =

Nigerian jurist (born 1959)

Justice of the Supreme Court of Nigeria
- Incumbent
- Assumed office 15 November 2013

Personal details
- Born: 11 July 1959 (age 67) Akwa Ibom State, Nigeria

John Inyang Okoro (born 11 July 1959) is a Nigerian jurist and Justice of the Supreme Court of Nigeria.

== Education ==
Okoro attended Methodist School, Nung Ukim from 1965 to 1972, Methodist Boys' High School, Oron from 1973 to 1977, School of Arts & Science, Uyo 1979 to 1981 and the University of Lagos from 1981 to 1984. He attended the Nigerian Law School, Lagos and was called to the Nigerian Bar in 1985.

== Legal career ==
Okoro started his legal career as Magistrate Grade II in 1986 and rose through the Magisterial Cadre culminating in his promotion to the post of Chief Magistrate Grade I in 1996. He was then appointed a Judge of the High Court of Akwa Ibom State from 1998 to 2006. Okoro was elevated to the Court of Appeal in 2006 and served in that capacity till 2013. His appointment as Justice of the Supreme Court of Nigeria was confirmed by the Senate in October 2013. He was sworn in on 15 November 2013 by Justice Aloma Mariam Mukhtar, the former Chief Justice of Nigeria.

== Appointments ==
Okoro has over the years served in different capacities and bodies, namely; Member, Election Petition Tribunal, Kano, 1998, Member, Governorship and Legislative Houses Election Petition Tribunal, Ondo State, 2003, Member, Governorship and Legislative Houses Election Petition Tribunal No.2 Delta State, 2003. He has also attended several seminars, workshops and conferences both locally and internationally. On 8 October 2016, he was arrested by the Department of State Security Services (DSS), on wrongful allegations of bribery and corruption. After investigations he was exonerated and recalled as a Judge of the Supreme Court. He was later cleared by the DSS in December 2019 and never faced trial for the crimes he was charged with.
