= Mahmud Mohammed =

Chief Justice of Nigeria from 2014 to 2016

Mahmud Mohammed GCON CON OFR

Chief Justice of Nigeria
- In office November 2014 – 10 November 2016
- Preceded by: Aloma Mariam Mukhtar
- Succeeded by: Walter Samuel Nkanu Onnoghen

Personal details
- Born: 10 November 1946 (age 79) Jalingo, Northern Region, British Nigeria (now Jalingo, Taraba State, Nigeria)
- Party: Non-partisian

Mahmud Mohammed GCON (born 10 November 1946) is a Nigerian jurist and Chief Justice of Nigeria from 2014 to 2016.

== Early life ==
Justice Mohammed was born on November 10, 1946, in Jalingo, the capital of Taraba State, northeastern Nigeria. He obtained a Bachelor of Law degree at Ahmadu Bello University in 1970 and was called to the Nigerian bar, the same year he graduated from the Nigerian Law School.

== Law career ==
He joined the services of the Ministries of Justice of the defunct North-eastern state as a barrister and in 1991, he became the acting Chief judge of Taraba State, the same year his appointment was confirmed as the Chief Judge of the state. In 2005, he was appointed to the bench of the Supreme Court of Nigeria as Justice. In November 2014, he was appointed the Chief Justice of Nigeria to succeed Aloma Mariam Mukhtar, the first female Justice of Nigeria. Justice Mahmud Mohammed is currently the Chairman of the National Judicial Council.

== Membership ==
- Member, Nigerian Bar Association
- Member, International Bar Association
- Member, Nigerian Body of Benchers
- Member, National Judicial Council
