= Edwin Speed =

Nigerian jurist

Sir Edwin Arney Speed (11 March 1869 – 14 December 1941) was the Chief Justice of Nigeria from 1914 to 1918. He was highly thought of by Lord Lugard who secured his appointment as the Chief Justice of the amalgamated Southern and Northern protectorates. He was tasked by Lugard to unify the laws of the two colonies and to establish a single Supreme, Provincial and Native court system.

== Life ==
Edward Arney Speed was born in March 1869, the son of Robert Henry Speed of Nottingham. His father was a solicitor of Nottingham County Court. He studied law at Trinity College, Cambridge, where he earned an LL.B. and M.A. He was called to the bar in June 1893 and practiced law in the Midland Circuit before he joined the colonial service. He was appointed District Commissioner to the Gold Coast in 1899. In 1890, Speed was appointed Attorney-General of the colony of Lagos and in 1906, that of Southern Nigeria where he was the Attorney-General until 1908 before he took over the post of Chief Justice of Northern Nigeria Protectorate.

On the amalgamation of Nigeria, Speed implemented new judicial ordinances that earned him criticism from sections of the Lagos bar and because of those ordinances and the opposition of lawyers to the new laws, he was not thought of as having the same reputation as his predecessors, William Nicol and Osborne.
