= Federal High Court of Nigeria =

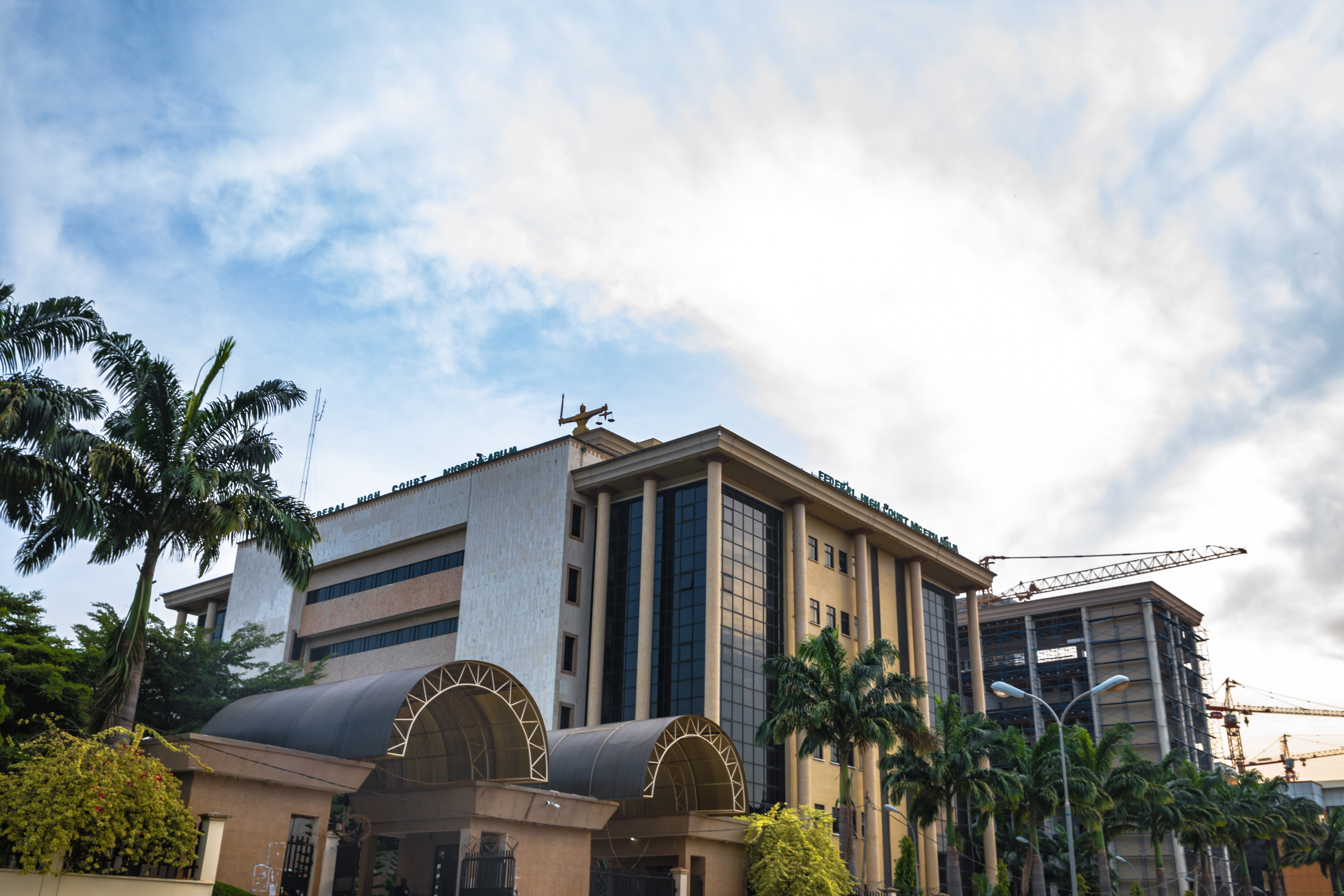
- The Federal High Court Complex in Abuja
- Established: 1973; 53 years ago
- Location: Shehu Shagari Way, Central District, Abuja, FCT, Nigeria
- Composition method: Presidential nomination with Senate confirmation
- Authorised by: Constitution of Nigeria
- Judge term length: Life tenure with mandatory retirement at the age of 65.
- Website: www.fhc.gov.ng

The Federal High Court of Nigeria (FHC) is one the Federal superior Courts of record in Nigeria. It has coordinate jurisdiction with the High Courts of the States of the Federation, including FCT. The headquarters is located in Shehu Shagari Way, Central District Abuja.

== Overview ==
The Federal High Court was formerly called the Federal Revenue Court and was established by the Federal Revenue Act of 1973. However, by virtue of section 228(1) and 230 (2) of the 1979 Constitution of the Federal Republic of Nigeria, it was renamed, Federal High Court. The Federal High Court has both criminal and civil jurisdiction over matter instituted before it pursuant to section 251 of the 1999 Constitution of the Federal Republic of Nigeria (as amended).

== Structure and Organization ==
The Federal High Court is composed of the Chief Judge and such number of judges as may be prescribed by an Act of the National Assembly. Judges of the FHC are appointed by the President on the recommendation of the National Judicial Council, and subject to confirmation by the Senate. To qualify for the post of a Chief Judge or judges of the Federal High Court, such a person must have been qualified to practice law in Nigeria, and must have been so qualified for a period not less than ten years. The retirement age for Judges of the Federal High Court of Nigeria is 70 years.

As at December, 2021, the total number of Federal High Court judges in the country stood at 75. Meanwhile, the total number of cases across the various judicial division was 128,000.

== List of Judicial Divisions ==
Although the court is headquartered in Federal Capital Territory, Abuja, it has several judicial divisions around the country. These are:

1. Federal High Court, Abuja (Headquarters)
2. Federal High Court, Abakaliki
3. Federal High Court, Abeokuta
4. Federal High Court, Akure
5. Federal High Court, Ado- Ekiti
6. Federal High Court, Awka
7. Federal High Court, Asaba
8. Federal High Court, Bauchi
9. Federal High Court, Yenegao
10. Federal High Court, Benin
11. Federal High Court Calabar
12. Federal High Court, Damaturu
13. Federal High Court, Dutse
14. Federal High Court, Enugu
15. Federal High Court, Gombe
16. Federal High Court, Ibadan
17. Federal High Court, Ikeja
18. Federal High Court, IIorin
19. Federal High Court, Jos
20. Federal High Court, Kaduna
21. Federal High Court, Kano
22. Federal High Court, Lafia
23. Federal High Court, Lagos
24. Federal High Court, Maiduguri
25. Federal High Court, Markurdi
26. Federal High Court, Minna
27. Federal High Court, Oshogbo
28. Federal High Court, Port Harcourt
29. Federal High Court, Owerri
30. Federal High Court, Sokoto
31. Federal High Court, Umuahia
32. Federal High Court, Warri
