= Uwani Musa Abba-Aji =

Nigerian Jurist (born 1956)

- Born: 7 November 1956 (age 69); Gashua, Yobe State
- Education: Ahmadu Bello University
- Occupation: Justice of the Supreme Court of Nigeria.

Uwani Musa Abba-Aji CFR (born 7 November 1956) is a Nigerian judge who has served as Justice of the Supreme Court of Nigeria since 2019.

== Early life and education ==
Uwani Musa Abba-Aji was born on 7 November 1956, in Gashua, Yobe State. She had her early education at Central Primary School Gashua in 1961 and then proceeded to Government Girls Secondary School, Maiduguri where she obtained the West Africa School Certificate in 1972.

In 1976, she received a Diploma in Law from the Ahmadu Bello University of Zaria and in 1980, an L.L.B Hons from the same school. Aji was called to the Bar in 1981, and in 1982 began her career as a state attorney.

== Career ==
Abba-Aji was appointed as State Counsel in 1982. Since being appointed State Counsel, she became Acting Senior Counsel in 1984, Senior Magistrate II in 1986, Senior Magistrate I in 1987, Chief Magistrate II in 1989, Chief Magistrate I in 1991, and Chief Registrar in November 1991. On 18 December 1991, she was appointed as Judge of the High Court, making her the first Lady Judge at Yobe State Judiciary.

She was promoted to Court of Appeal on 22 September 2004. She is the President of the National Association of Women Judges and was selected as an ICPC Anticorruption Judge between 2001 and 2014. Abba-Aji was confirmed by the Nigerian Senate on 20 December 2018, and appointed as a Justice of the Supreme Court on 8 January 2019.

== Personal life ==
She is married to Musa Abba-Aji, a former Head of Service at the Borno State Civil Service. The couple has three children.
