= Akintola Hanif =

American photographer

Akintola Hanif (born 1972) is an American photographer based in Newark, New Jersey.

Born in Brooklyn, New York, Hanif is a photographer who primarily creates portraits of marginalized and dispossessed people, especially people of color, in the tradition of Jamel Shabazz, Richard Avedon, or Gordon Parks. He says his work is about "the souls of the misunderstood." Hanif opened his photo studio, Hycide, in 2009 and founded a photojournal by the same name in 2011. The journal is in the permanent collections of Schomburg Center for Research in Black Culture, the Metropolitan Museum of Art Thomas J. Watson Library, the International Center for Photography, the Newark Public Library, and the Library of Congress.

His photography has been exhibited at Aljira Center for Contemporary Art, The Guggenheim Museum, Museum of Contemporary Photography, a Center for Contemporary Art, MoCADA Museum, Princeton University, Lowe Art Museum in Miami and the Metropolitan Museum of Art. He curated the exhibition, "Off White," at Museum of Contemporary African Diasporan Arts in 2016.

In 2020 Hanif won a Creative Catalyst Artist Fellowship Grant from Newark Arts.

In 2017 Hanif suffered a debilitating stroke but continued his work.
