= Kudirat Kekere-Ekun =

Chief Justice of Nigeria since 2024

Kudirat Kekere-Ekun GCON CFR

Chief Justice of Nigeria
- Incumbent
- Assumed office 22 August 2024
- Preceded by: Olukayode Ariwoola

Justice of the Supreme Court of Nigeria
- Incumbent
- Assumed office July 2013

Personal details
- Born: 7 May 1958 (age 68) London, England, United Kingdom
- Party: Non partisan
- Education: University of Lagos (LL.B.); Nigerian Law School; London School of Economics (LL.M.)
- Occupation: Lawyer; Judge

Kudirat Motonmori Olatokunbo GCON CFR (born 7 May 1958), popularly known as Kudirat Kekere-Ekun, is an English-born Nigerian jurist and Justice of the Supreme Court of Nigeria who has served as the Chief Justice of Nigeria since 22 August 2024. She was appointed Chief Justice following the retirement of Chief Justice Olukayode Ariwoola.

== Early life and education ==
Kekere Ekun was born on 7 May 1958 in London, United Kingdom. In 1980, she received a bachelor's degree in Law from the University of Lagos and was admitted to the Nigeria Bar on 10 July 1981, having graduated from the Nigerian Law School. She received a master's degree in law from the London School of Economics in November 1983.

== Awards ==
In October 2022, the Nigerian national honour of Commander of the Order of the Federal Republic (CFR) was conferred on her by President Muhammadu Buhari.

== Law career ==
Kudirat joined the Lagos State Judiciary as Senior Magistrate II and rose to the position of the State High Court Judge. She served as Chairman of Robbery and Firearms Tribunal, Zone II, Ikeja between November 1996 to May 1999. She was appointed to the bench of the Nigerian courts of appeal in 2004 before her appointment as Justice of the Supreme Court of Nigeria in July 2013.

In 2020, Kekere-Ekun was on the seven-member panel that sacked Imo State governor Emeka Ihedioha and declared that the winning candidate was Hope Uzodinma of the All Progressives Congress (APC), who originally came fourth in the election results. Ihedioha described the verdict as "unfair, unjust and does not reflect the voting that took place during the elections", but said he would respect the judgement.

== Appointment ==
On 23 August 2024, Kekere-Ekun was sworn in by President Bola Tinubu at the Council Chamber of the State House in Abuja. Her appointment makes her the second woman to become Nigeria's Chief Justice after Justice Aloma Mariam Mukhtar. Kekere-Ekun also becomes the first woman from Southwest geopolitical zone of Nigeria to become Chief Justice of Nigeria.
