= National Interest Party (Nigeria) =

Political party in Nigeria

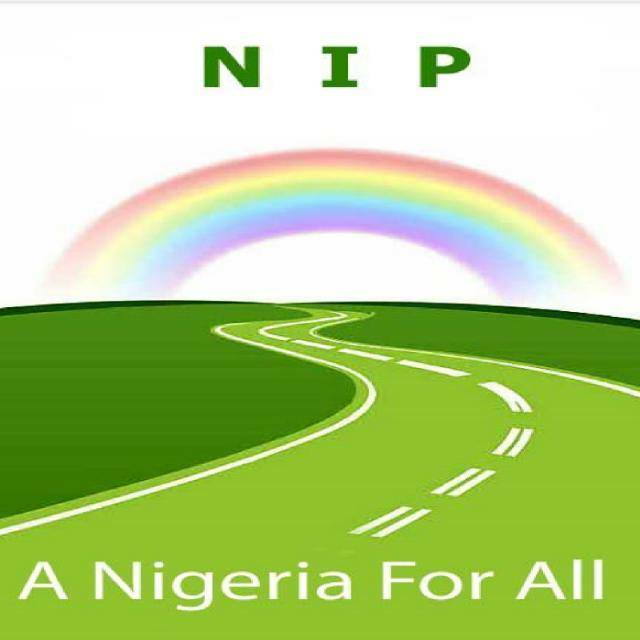
- Motto: Integrity, Commitment & Transparency
- National Chairman: Eunice Atuejide
- Deputy National Chairman: Suleiman Barde Ibrahim
- National Secretary: Dr. Oluwafikayo Seun Adeyemi
- Deputy National Secretary: Israel Azeez Audu
- National Treasurer: Hadiza Hussein Abdullahi
- Founded: 2017; 9 years ago
- Headquarters: Suite 101, NCWS Building, Area 11, Garki, FCT, Abuja
- Slogan: A Nigeria For All

Party flag
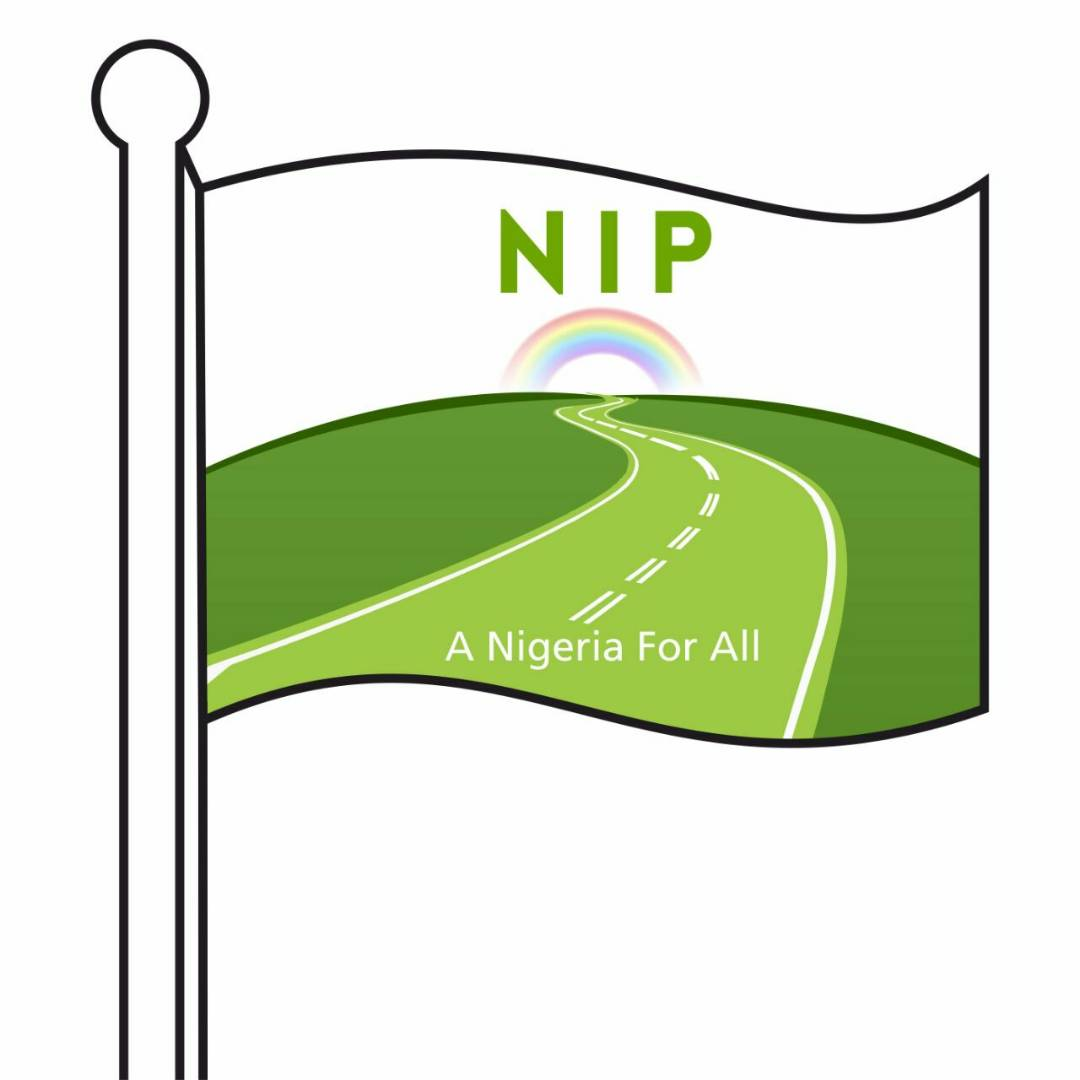

Website
- www.nationalinterestparty.com

The National Interest Party (NIP) is a political party in Nigeria. It was formed in 2017 by a group of young Nigerians led by Eunice Atuejide, NIP's founder and first National Chairman. NIP is designed to function predominantly online, therefore it is safe to refer to NIP as the world's first virtual political party. NIP adopts a centrist progressive ideology - that is, the party is neither leftist nor rightist. The party balances social conservative values with economic liberalism, thereby striking a balance between liberal ideology supporting social justice and enhanced government regulations, and a conservative ideology supporting pro-business and pro-growth reforms. The party aims to attract exceptional talents of Nigerian descent to vie for elective roles in the polity. NIP is designed to appeal to Nigerians who are willing to work for the betterment of all Nigerians. The party aims to unite people irrespective of ethnic origins, religions, creeds, languages, tribes, etc. People who will help the party build an all-inclusive Nigeria with the sincerity of purpose that has eluded the country since inception.

== Structure ==
Membership of NIP is open to every Nigerian over the age of 18 irrespective of physical location. This allows for Nigerians outside Nigeria to directly take part in shaping the direction of the party, as well as influencing the outcome of primary elections which produce the aspirants for general elections. In effect, Nigerians in the diaspora have the same level of influence as Nigerians within the shores of Nigeria in deciding the affairs of the party, and in the selection of aspirants to vie for office at general elections on the party's platform. In effect, Nigerians in the diaspora may take part in primary elections at NIP, and emerge NIP's final aspirants for participation in general elections in Nigeria from wherever in the world they reside. Nigerians in the diaspora may contest and win NIP's primaries without first making a trip to Nigeria, as they can reach and campaign to all party members via the party's website. All NIP elections are held online.

KEY PEOPLE AND OFFICES
| Office | Name |
|---|---|
| National Chairman | Eunice Atuejide |
| Deputy National Chairman | Suleiman Barde Ibrahim |
| National Secretary | Dr Oluwafikayo Seun Adeyemi |
| Deputy National Secretary | Israel Azeez Audu |
| National Treasurer | Hadiza Hussein Abdullahi |
| National Media & Publicity Secretary | Victor Nkemjika Nwankwo |

== Executives ==
NIP strictly admits only men and women with undisputed integrity at the helm of its affairs. The party does not have a large number of executive roles because being a predominantly online platform, the party can function smoothly with fewer executives than most political parties. The party also has fewer than normal physical offices, however, it has many contact and support centres with local schools, business owners, places of worship etc. for the purpose of helping party members navigating the online platform.

The executive positions of the party include the following
| Positions | Slots |
|---|---|
| Ward Representatives | ca. 8,800 slots |
| LGA Chairmen | 774 slots |
| LGA Deputy Chairmen | 774 slots |
| LGA Secretaries | 774 slots |
| LGA Accountants | 774 slots |
| Senatorial District Representatives | 109 slots |
| State Chairmen | 37 slots |
| Deputy State Chairmen | 37 slots |
| State Treasurers | 37 slots |
| State Internal Auditors | 37 slots |
| State Organising Secretaries | 37 slots |
| Board of Trustees | 150 people max including up to a maximum of 50 Patrons |
| Patrons | 50 people max |
| National Executive Committee | 27 slots |

Apart from the Board of Trustees and the Patrons who are selected and/or elected in accordance with the party's constitutional provisions, all other positions above are open for free and fair contests via NIP's website. All party members over the age of 21 may contest any of the above positions provided they meet the party's additional constitutional requirements to contest the positions they wish to fill. All members who wish to contest at NIP must first however first submit themselves to NIP's Screening Committee for a thorough background check. All aspirants are checked against the constitutional requirements for holding public office in Nigeria before they are permitted to vie for any office under the platform. Once successfully screened, aspirants are automatically admitted to the Leadership Cadre of the party which comprises all the men and women deemed fit to hold public office and control the affairs of the party. NIP is more interested in selecting honest Nigerians who identify with its ideologies and strategy for bringing about a progressing Nigeria than it is in admitting more popular politicians, the educated or the wealthy class.

== Leadership cadre ==
NIP Leadership
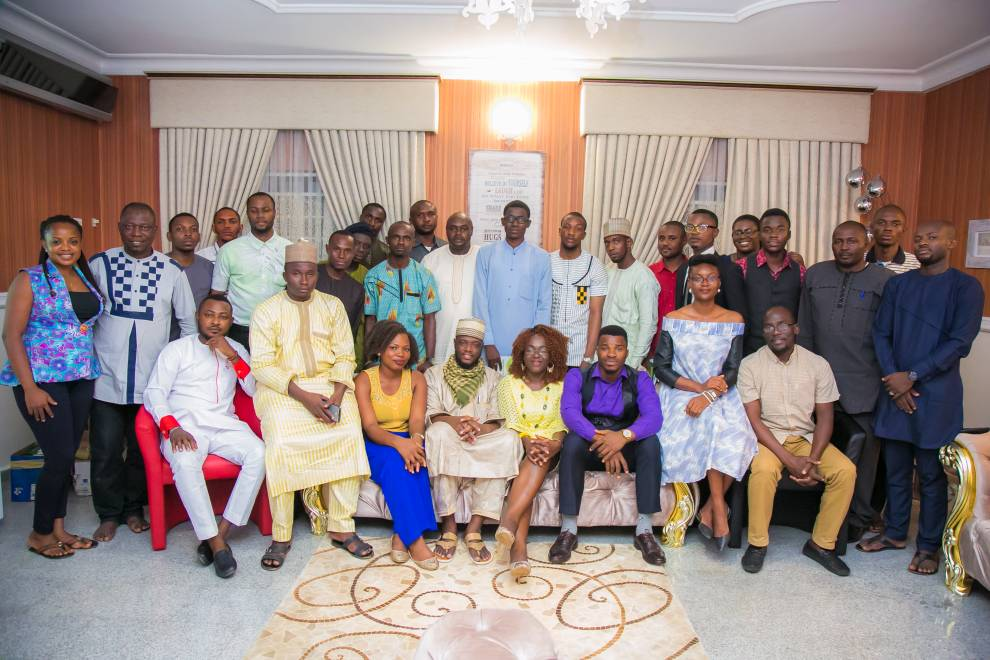
- NIP Leadership Cross Section Photo

Every Nigerian over the age of 18 can join NIP; however, only Nigerians 21 or over, who distinguish themselves may join the Leadership Cadre of NIP. Only those who cross into this cadre may run for office within the party, run on the party's platform to seek political office in Nigeria, and/or get nominated or appointed to hold public office in Nigeria through the party. In effect, members who wish to work as Ward Representatives at extremely remote villages, just like those who wish to contest national elections or even the Presidency must first get past the Screening Committee to cross into the Leadership Cadre to do so. A token is paid by each applicant for the screening, however, candidates who cannot raise the required amount may use the points they accumulated from referring people to join NIP to pay their screening fees. This allows indigent but decent members of the party the opportunity to become executives of the party and/or vie for public office on the party's platform notwithstanding the requirement to pay for their screening. Every member who meets the requirements to join the Leadership Cadre is encouraged to submit to the screening process because membership of the cadre allows them active and passive control of the party. It is from this group that members will be selected to represent the party were called upon to send forth party representatives. Leadership Cadre members will also have the opportunity to design programs for party members which may be implemented online and/or on ground e.g. lectures, webinars, seminars, symposiums etc. The cadre will consist only of Nigerians from every corner of the country who have been thoroughly checked for criminal history and behaviour, dishonest use of private and public funds, embezzlement or fraud, bankruptcies, involvement with terrorist organisations, secessionist groups, secret cults, community development initiatives etc. and found to have led exemplary lives. Those are the only members of NIP who may lead the party, run for office on the party's platform, and through appointive roles, lead the country. Once successfully screened and admitted, leadership members are free to compete with other interested aspirants for whatever roles they wish to contest. It takes a click to join races candidates qualify for, however, they are restricted to run for one office at a time. Restrictions imposed by the party's constitution and the constitution of the Federal Republic of Nigeria also apply. NIP's nomination forms are free and the party does not charge membership subscription fees. It relies on the voluntary donations of members to run its affairs.
