= Helen Ogunwumiju =

Nigerian Jurist (born 1957)

The Honourable Helen Ogunwumiju

Justice of the Supreme Court of Nigeria
- Incumbent
- Assumed office 6 November 2020

Personal details
- Born: 23 March 1957 (age 69) Ondo State, Nigeria
- Party: Non partisan

Helen Moronkeji Ogunwumiju (born 23 March 1957) is a Nigerian jurist who has served as a Justice of the Supreme Court of Nigeria since 2020. She is the seventh woman to be appointed to the nation's highest court.
