= Olukayode Ariwoola =

Chief Justice of Nigeria from 2022 to 2024

Olukayode Ariwoola GCON
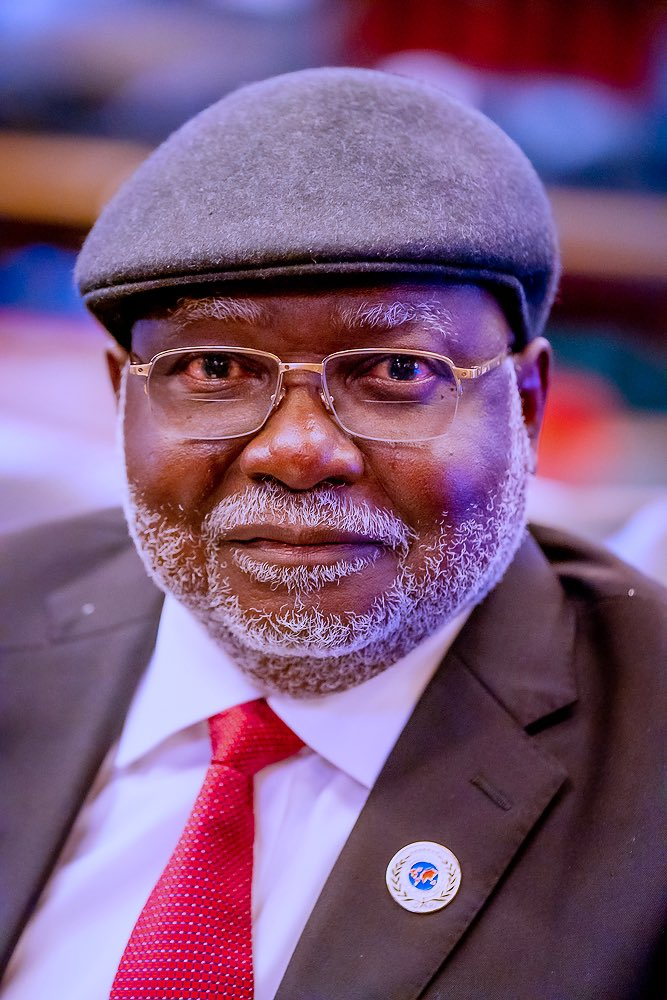

Chief Justice of Nigeria
- In office 27 June 2022 – 22 August 2024
- Preceded by: Ibrahim Tanko Muhammad
- Succeeded by: Kudirat Kekere-Ekun

Justice of the Supreme Court of Nigeria
- In office 22 November 2011 – 22 August 2024

Personal details
- Born: 22 August 1954 (age 71) Iseyin, Southern Region, British Nigeria (now in Oyo State, Nigeria)
- Education: Obafemi Awolowo University

Olukayode Ariwoola GCON(born 22 August 1954) is a Nigerian jurist and justice of the Supreme Court of Nigeria who served as the chief justice of the Federal Republic of Nigeria from 2022 to 2024. He was formerly a justice of the Nigerian courts of appeal and on 22 November 2011, he was appointed to the bench of the supreme court of Nigeria. He was appointed substantive chief justice of Nigeria on 27 June 2022 following the resignation of former chief justice Tanko Muhammad and formally confirmed chief justice by the Nigerian Senate on 21 September 2022.

== Early life and education ==
Ariwoola was born in Iseyin, Oyo State, started his primary education in Local Authority Demonstration School, Oluwole in Iseyin local government area of Oyo State. He then proceeded to Muslim Modern School in the same town from 1968 to 1969 and later attended Ansar-Ud-Deen High School Shaki, Oyo State where he completed his High School.

== Legal career ==
Ariwoola graduated from the University of Ife (now Obafemi Awolowo University), Ile Ife, Osun State, where he obtained his bachelor's degree in law (LLB). He was called to the Nigerian bar and got enrolled at the Supreme Court of Nigeria as a Solicitor and Advocate in July 1981. Ariwoola started his career as a State Counsel on National Youth Service Corps (NYSC) at the Ministry of Justice, Akure, Ondo State, and later as a Legal Officer in the Ministry of Justice, Oyo State, until 1988, when he voluntarily left the State Civil Service for private practice. He had worked as counsel in the Chambers of Chief Ladosu Ladapo, SAN, between October 1988 and July 1989, when he established Olukayode Ariwoola & Co., a firm of legal practitioners and consultants in Oyo town in August 1989, from where he was appointed in November 1992 as a Judge of Oyo State Judiciary. He was chairman, Board of Directors, Phonex Motors Ltd., one of the Oodua Investment conglomerates, between 1988 and 1992, and chairman, Armed Robbery Tribunal, Oyo State, between May 1993 and September 1996, when he was posted out of the headquarters, Ibadan, to Saki High Court. Ariwoola, before his elevation to the Supreme Court, served as Justice of the Court of Appeal in Kaduna, Enugu, and Lagos Divisions.

Justice Olukayade Ariwoola is the immediate past chief justice of Nigeria (CJN).

== Membership ==
- Member, Nigerian Bar Association
- Member, International Bar Association
- Member, Nigerian Body of Benchers

== National honours and Recognitions ==
In October 2022, Grand Commander of the Order of the Niger (GCON), a Nigerian national honour was conferred on Ariwoola by President Muhammadu Buhari.

On 11 June 2024, he was conferred with the title of Special Marshal by the FRSC.
