= Aloma Mariam Mukhtar =

Nigerian chief justice 2012–2014 (born 1944)

Aloma Mariam Mukhtar GCON

Chief Justice of Nigeria
- In office 16 July 2012 – 20 November 2014
- Preceded by: Dahiru Musdapher
- Succeeded by: Mahmud Mohammed

Personal details
- Born: 20 November 1944 (age 81)

Aloma Mariam Mukhtar GCON (born 20 November 1944) is a Nigerian jurist and former Chief Justice of Nigeria from July 2012 to November 2014. She was called to the English Bar in November, 1966 and to the Nigerian Bar in 1967.

Mukhtar taking the oath of office as Chief Justice

On 16 July 2012, President Goodluck Jonathan swore her in as the 13th indigenous Chief Justice of Nigeria, and conferred on her the Nigerian National Honour of the Grand Commander of the Order of the Niger (GCON).

== Background ==
Mukhtar is from Adamawa state. She attended Saint George’s Primary School, Zaria, St. Bartholomew’s School, Wusasa, Zaria, Rossholme School for Girls, East Brent, Somerset, England, Reading Technical College, Reading, Berkshire, England, and Gibson and Weldon College of Law, England, before being called to the English Bar in absentia in November, 1966.

== Career ==
Mukhtar began her career in 1967 as Pupil State Counsel, Ministry of Justice, Northern Nigeria and rose through the ranks:

- Office of the Legal Draftsman, Interim Common Services Agency, Magistrate Grade I, North Eastern State Government, 1971
- Chief Registrar, Kano State Government Judiciary, 1973
- Chief Registrar, Kano State Government Judiciary, 1973
- Judge of the High Court of Kano State, 1977–1987
- Justice of the Court of Appeal of Nigeria, Ibadan division, 1987–1993
- Justice of the Supreme Court of Nigeria, 2005–2012
- Justice of the Supreme Court of The Gambia, 2011–2012
- Chief Justice of Nigeria, 2012–2014

In her career, Mukhtar has been many firsts: she is the first female lawyer from Northern Nigeria, first female judge of the High Court in Kano State judiciary, the first female justice of the Court of Appeal of Nigeria, the first female justice of the Supreme Court of Nigeria (certain sources have erroneously given Roseline Ukeje this honor) and the first female Chief Justice of Nigeria.

== Awards ==
During her career she received several awards including the Nigerian national honor of Commander of the Order of the Niger in 2006. In 1993, she received a Gold Merit Award for her contribution to the development of law in Kano state and was also inducted into the Nigerian Hall of Fame in 2005.

On 16 July 2012, President of Nigeria Goodluck Jonathan conferred on her the National Honour of the Grand Commander of the Order of Niger.

== See also ==
- First women lawyers around the world
