= Chief Justice of Nigeria =

Presiding judge of the Supreme Court of Nigeria

Chief Justice of the Supreme Court of Nigeria
- Incumbent; Kudirat Kekere-Ekun since 22 August 2024
- Supreme Court of Nigeria
- Style: Madam Chief Justice (informal); Your Honor (within court); The Honorable (formal)
- Status: Chief justice
- Member of: Federal judiciary National Judicial Council
- Seat: Supreme Court Building, Three Arms Zone, Abuja, FCT
- Appointer: The president with Senate advice and consent
- Term length: Resignation; Death; Attainment of age 70
- Constituting instrument: Constitution of Nigeria
- Formation: 1914 (112 years ago); 1 October 1963 (62 years ago) Supreme Court of Nigeria
- First holder: Sir Edwin Speed (colonial); Sir Adetokunbo Ademola (Indigenous)
- Website: http://www.supremecourt.gov.ng/

The chief justice of Nigeria (CJN) is the head of the judicial arm of the government of Nigeria, and presides over the country's Supreme Court and the National Judicial Council. The current chief justice is Kudirat Kekere-Ekun who was appointed on 22 August 2024. She was appointed acting chief justice of the Federation upon the retirement of incumbent chief justice, Olukayode Ariwoola. The Supreme Court of Nigeria is the highest court in Nigeria and its decisions are final. The chief justice of Nigeria is nominated by the president of the Federal Republic of Nigeria upon recommendation by the National Judicial Council and is subject to confirmation by the Senate of the Federal Republic of Nigeria. The CJN holds office at the pleasure of the Nigerian constitution and can only be removed from office by death or on attainment of age 70 whichever occurs first or by impeachment by the Senate of the Federal Republic of Nigeria which requires a super majority of the members of the Nigerian Senate.

== List of chief justices ==
The following is a complete list of chief justices of Nigeria.

Chief Justice	Term
Sir Edwin Speed	1914–1918
Sir Ralph Combe	1918–1929
Donald Kingdon	1929–1946
Sir John Verity	1946–1954
Sir Stafford Foster-Sutton	1955–1958
Sir Adetokunbo Ademola	1958–1972
Taslim Olawale Elias	1972–1975
Sir Darnley Arthur Alexander	1975–1979
Atanda Fatai Williams	1979–1983
George Sodeinde Sowemimo	1983–1985
Ayo Gabriel Irikefe	1985–1987
Mohammed Bello	1987–1995
Mohammed Uwais	1995–2006
Salihu Modibbo Alfa Belgore	2006–2007
Idris Legbo Kutigi	2007–2009
A. I. Katsina-Alu	2009–2011
Dahiru Musdapher	2011–2012
Aloma Mariam Mukhtar	2012–2014
Mahmud Mohammed	2014–2016
Walter Onnoghen	2017–2019
Tanko Muhammad	2019–2022
Olukayode Ariwoola	2022–2024
Kudirat Kekere-Ekun	2024–present

== List of previous chief justices ==
Lagos (1863–1929)

- Benjamin Way (?–1866)
- John Carr (1866–?) (West African Settlements Supreme Court)
- George French (1867–1874)
- James Marshall (1874–1886)
- Sir John Salman Smith (1886–1895)
- Sir Thomas Crossley Rayner (1895–1902)
- Sir William Nicholl (1902–1908)

Northern Nigeria

- Alastair Davidson (1900–1901)
- Henry Cowper Gollan (1901–1905)
- Sir M R Menendez (1905–1908)
- Sir Edwin Speed (1908–1913)

Southern Nigeria

- Henry Green Kelly (1900–1902)
- Willoughby Osborne (1906–1913)
