= National Judicial Council (Nigeria) =

Executive body of judiciary

Federal Executive Body overview
- Headquarters: Three Arms Zone, Abuja, FCT, Nigeria
- Federal Executive Body executive: Kudirat Kekere-Ekun, Chairman
- Parent department: Federal Government of Nigeria
- Key document: Section 153 of the 1999 Constitution of Nigeria
- Website: njc.gov.ng

The National Judicial Council (NJC), is an executive body established by the Federal Government of Nigeria in accordance with the provisions of Section 153 of the 1999 Constitution as amended to protect the Judiciary of Nigeria from the whims and caprices of the Executive.

The chairman of the council is the chief justice of Nigeria, Hon. Kudirat Kekere-Ekun, while the deputy chairman is Hon. Justice John Inyang Okoro, justice of the Supreme Court of Nigeria. Other members are: the president of the Court of Appeal, four retired justices of the Supreme Court, a retired president of the Court of Appeal, president of National Industrial Court, chief judge of the Federal High Court, chief judge of the High Court FCT, chief judges of High Court of four states, president of Customary Court of Appeal, Grand Khadi of Sharia Court of Appeal, president of the Nigerian Bar Association, a former president of the Nigeria Bar Association, three members of the Nigeria Bar Association, and two retired public servants. The present secretary of council is Ahmed Gambo Saleh, Esq.

== Statutory duties ==
The NJC perform several judicial functions such as advising the President of Nigeria and Governors on issues related to the judiciary. They also perform disciplinary functions as well as appointment and nomination of executive members of the Judicial.

== See also ==
- Nigerian Body of Benchers
