= Nigerian Courts of Appeal =

Intermediate appellate courts

The Federal Court of Appeal of Nigeria is the intermediate Appellate Court of the Nigerian federal court system. The Court of Appeal of Nigeria decides appeals from the district courts within the federal judicial system, and in some instances from other designated federal courts and administrative agencies. As at 2010, there are 66 judges of the Nigerian courts of appeals authorized by the Senate. These judges are recommended by the National Judicial Council (NJC), nominated by the President of Nigeria and confirmed by the Senate. There are currently seventy-two Nigerian courts of appeals across the six geopolitical zones of Nigeria. There are 12 in the North-Central, 10 in North-East, 10 in North-West, 10 in South-South, 9 in South-East and 11 in South Western Nigeria. The headquarter is located at Three Arms Zone, Abuja.

== Structure and Organization ==
The Court is composed of a President and such number of Justices of not more than The Justices of the Court of Appeal, are appointed by the President of the country on the recommendation of the National Judicial Council, (NJC). For the office of the President of the Court of appeal, the recommendation and appointment is subject to the confirmation by the Senate.

Justices of the Court of Appeal must be qualified to practice law in Nigeria, and must have been so qualified for a period not less than twelve years in practice. In line with the provision of the Constitution, Justices of the Court of appeal have a mandatory retirement age of 70 years

== Judicial councils ==
Judicial councils such as the National Judicial Council (Nigeria) are bodies that are concerned with making "necessary and appropriate orders for the effective and expeditious administration of justice" within the court. Among their responsibilities are judicial discipline, the formulation of policies and implementation of such policies.

== Jurisdiction ==
The Court of Appeal like other superior court of records in Nigeria, derives its original and appellate jurisdiction from the Constitution as well as various Acts of the National Assembly. The Original jurisdiction of the Court of appeal is spelt out in section 239 of the Constitution. This section empowers the court to hear and determine matters on election petitions involving the election into the office of the President or vice president. However, pursuant to section 240 of the Constitution of the Federal Republic of Nigeria 1999 (as amended), the court of appeal is conferred with the exclusive appellate jurisdiction to hear and determine appeals from the following courts;

- Federal high court
- The High Court of the States
- High Court of the Federal Capital Territory, Abuja
- Sharia Court of Appeal
- Customary court of Appeal
- Court martial
- Tribunal

== See also ==
- Supreme Court of Nigeria
