= Supreme Court of Nigeria =

Highest court of Nigeria

- Interactive map of Supreme Court of Nigeria
- Established: 1 October 1963; 62 years ago
- Jurisdiction: Nigeria
- Location: Three Arms Zone, Abuja, FCT, Nigeria
- Composition method: Presidential nomination with confirmation by the senate
- Authorised by: Constitution of Nigeria
- Judge term length: Life tenure with mandatory retirement at the age of 70
- Number of positions: 21
- Website: supremecourt.gov.ng

Chief Justice of Nigeria
- Currently: Kudirat Kekere-Ekun
- Since: 22 August 2024

The Supreme Court of Nigeria (SCN) is the highest court in Nigeria, and is located in the Central District, Abuja, in what is known as the Three Arms Zone, so called due to the proximity of the offices of the Presidential Complex, the National Assembly, and the Supreme Court.

== Overview ==
In 1963, the Federal Republic of Nigeria was proclaimed and Nnamdi Azikiwe became its first President. Appeals from the Federal Supreme Court to the Judicial Committee of the Privy Council were abolished at that point, and the Supreme Court became the highest court in Nigeria. In 1976, the Court of Appeal (originally known as the Federal Court of Appeal) was established as a national court to entertain appeals from the High Courts of each of Nigeria's 36 states, which are the trial courts of general jurisdiction. The Supreme Court in its current form was shaped by the Supreme Court Act of 1990 and by Chapter VII of the 1999 Constitution of Nigeria.

Under the 1999 constitution, the Supreme Court has both original and appellate jurisdictions, has the sole authority and jurisdiction to entertain appeals from Court of Appeal, having appellate jurisdiction over all lower federal courts and highest state courts. Decisions rendered by the court are binding on all courts in Nigeria except the Supreme Court itself.

== Structure and organization ==
The Supreme Court is composed of the Chief Justice of Nigeria and such number of justices not more than 21, appointed by the President on the recommendation of the National Judicial Council, (NJC) and subject to confirmation by the Senate. Justices of the Supreme Court must be qualified to practice law in Nigeria, and must have been so qualified for a period not less than fifteen years. Justices of the Supreme Court of Nigeria have a mandatory retirement age of 70 years.

== Current justices ==
Office	Name	Term
Chief Justice	Kudirat Kekere-Ekun	2013–present
Associate Justice	John Inyang Okoro	2013–present
Associate justice	Uwani Musa Abba Aji	2018–present
Associate Justice	M. Lawal Garba	2020–present
Associate Justice	Helen M. Ogunwumiju	2020–present
Associate Justice	I. M. M. Saulawa	2020–present
Associate Justice	Adamu Jauro	2020–present
Associate Justice	Tijjani Abubakar	2020–present
Associate Justice	Emmanuel A. Agim	2020–present
Associate Justice	Haruna Tsammani	2024–present
Associate Justice	Moore Adumein	2024–present
Associate Justice	Jummai Sankey	2024–present
Associate Justice	Chidiebere Uwa	2024–present
Associate Justice	Chioma Nwosu-Iheme	2024–present
Associate Justice	Obande Ogbuinya	2024–present
Associate Justice	Stephen Adah	2024–present
Associate Justice	Habeeb Abiru	2024–present
Associate Justice	Jamilu Tukur	2024–present
Associate Justice	Abubakar Umar	2024–present
Associate Justice	Mohammed Idris	2024–present

== Others ==
On 26 March 2019, Justice Sidi Dauda Bage was appointed Emir of Lafia

== See also ==
Supreme Court Act 1990
