= 2019 Nigerian general election =

- 23–24 February 2019
- Registered: 82,344,107
- Presidential election
- Turnout: 34.75% (▼8.90pp)
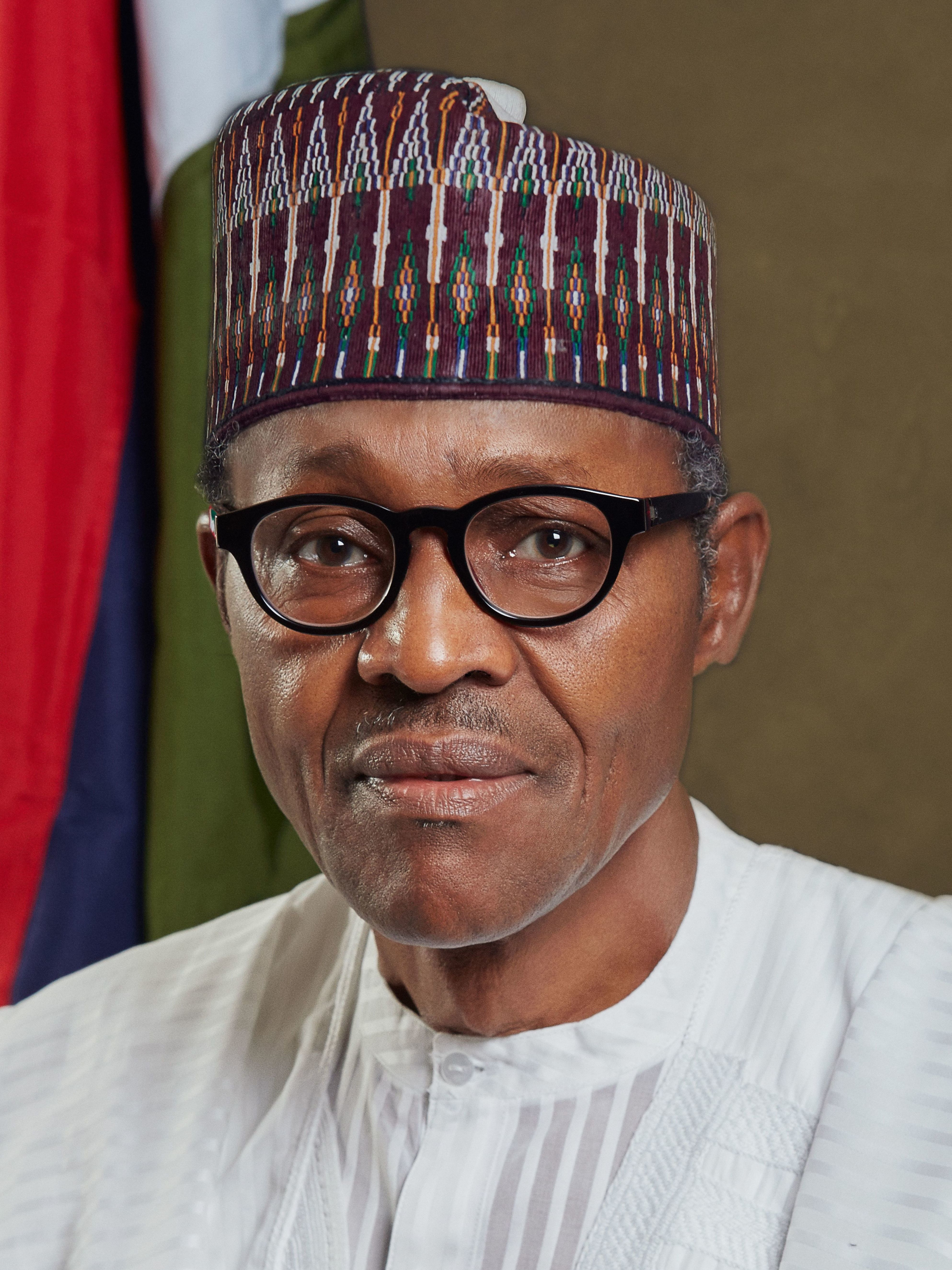

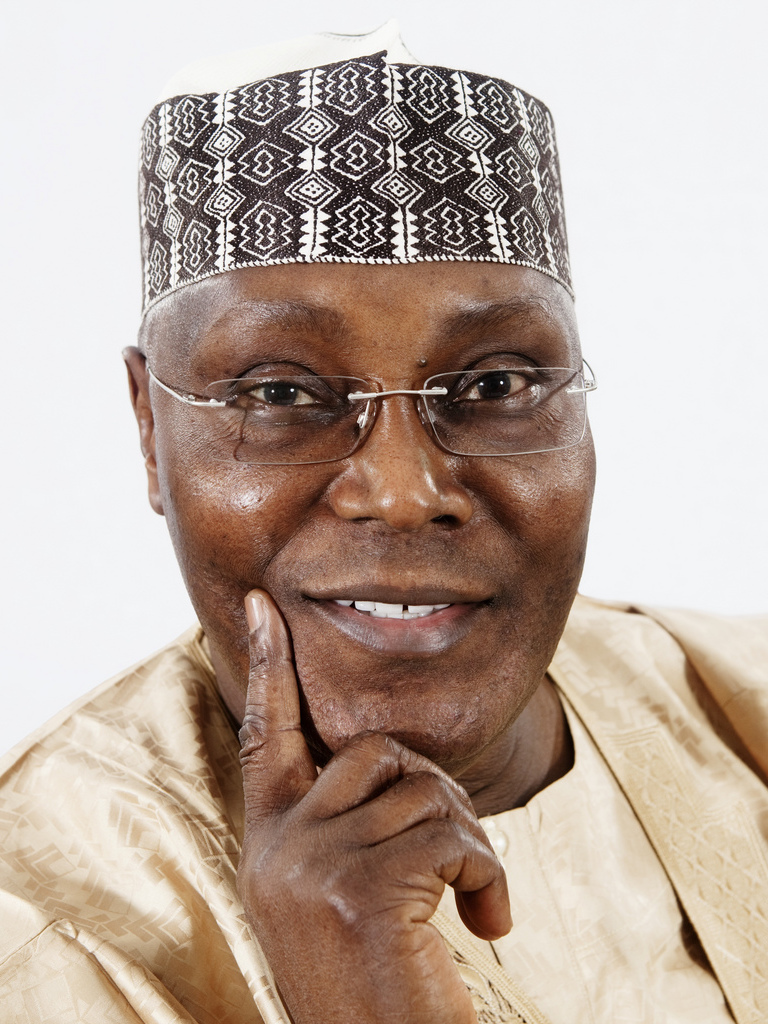
Nominee	Muhammadu Buhari	Atiku Abubakar
Party	APC	PDP
Running mate	Yemi Osinbajo	Peter Obi
States carried	19	17 + FCT
Popular vote	15,191,847	11,262,978
Percentage	55.60%	41.22%
President before election
Muhammadu Buhari
APC
Elected President
Muhammadu Buhari
APC
- Senate election
Party	Leader	Seats	+/–
APC	Ahmed Ibrahim Lawan	63	+3
PDP	Bukola Saraki	45	−3
YPP	Ifeanyi Ubah	1	New
This lists parties that won seats. See the complete results below.
- House of Representatives election
Party	Leader	Seats	+/–
APC	Femi Gbajabiamila	202	−10
PDP	Yakubu Dogara	128	−12
APGA	Victor Ikechukwu Oye	9	+4
ADC		3	+3
AA		2	New
PRP		2	+2
ADP		1	New
APM		1	New
LP	Mike Omotosho	1	0
SDP	Olu Falae	1	0
This lists parties that won seats. See the complete results below.

General elections were held in Nigeria on 23 February 2019 to elect the President, Vice President, House of Representatives and the Senate. The elections had initially been scheduled for 16 February 2019, but the Electoral Commission postponed the vote by a week at 03:00 on the original polling day, citing logistical challenges in getting electoral materials to polling stations on time. In some places, the vote was delayed until 24 February 2019 due to electoral violence. Polling in some areas was subsequently delayed until 9 March, when voting was carried out alongside gubernatorial and state assembly elections.

The elections were the most expensive ever held in Nigeria, costing ₦69 billion (US$625 million) more than the 2015 elections.

Incumbent president Muhammadu Buhari won his re-election bid, defeating his closest rival Atiku Abubakar by over 3 million votes. He was issued a Certificate of Return, and was sworn in on 29 May 2019, the former date of Democracy Day.

== Electoral system ==
The President of Nigeria is elected using a modified two-round system, to be elected in the first round, a candidate must receive a majority of the vote and over 25% of the vote in at least 24 of the 36 states. If no candidate passes this threshold, a second round is held.

The 109 members of the Senate were elected from 109 single-seat constituencies (three in each state and one for the Federal Capital Territory) by first-past-the-post voting. The 360 members of the House of Representatives were also elected by first-past-the-post voting in single-member constituencies.

== Voting process ==
On 10th January 2019, the Independent National Electoral Commission (INEC) published a seven-step voting procedure to guide voters on election day. Under the process, a voter first joined the queue at their designated polling unit, where an assistant presiding officer verified that the permanent voter card (PVC) matched the correct polling unit and confirmed the photograph against the voter's face. A second official then verified the PVC's authenticity using a Smart Card Reader, The voter then confirmed ownership by placing a finger on the device to verify it against the biometric data stored on the card.

Once accreditation was confirmed, the voter received a ballot paper from the presiding officer, And proceeded to a voting cubicle to thumbprint the box corresponding to their preferred candidate or party in secret. Indelible ink was applied to the voter's finger to prevent multiple voting, after which the voter folded the ballot paper as instructed and deposited it into the transparent ballot box in full view of those present at the polling unit to safeguard transparency.

Voters could then either leave the polling unit or remain to observe the count, which took place publicly immediately after voting closed, with results pasted at the polling unit for public viewing before transmission to collation centres. INEC combined the accreditation and voting stages into a single continuous process for the 2019 elections, a departure from the separate accreditation and voting windows used in 2015, intended to reduce the time voters spent at polling units and to curb the risk of politically motivated disruption between the two stages.

== Presidential candidates ==
=== Party primaries ===
==== PDP ====
The People's Democratic Party held its presidential primaries on 5 October 2018, at the Adokiye Amiesimaka Stadium, Port Harcourt, Rivers State. Thirteen aspirants contested for the ticket of the PDP, with Atiku Abubakar emerging the winner.

Candidate	Votes	%
Atiku Abubakar	1,532	48.6
Aminu Tambuwal	693	22.0
Bukola Saraki	317	10.1
Rabiu Kwankwaso	158	5.0
Ibrahim Dankwambo	111	3.5
Sule Lamido	96	3.0
Ahmed Makarfi	74	2.3
Tanimu Turaki	65	2.1
Attahiru Bafarawa	48	1.5
David Mark	35	1.1
Jonah Jang	19	0.6
Datti Ahmed	5	0.1
Total	3,153	100
Source: The Punch

==== APC ====
Though some party members aspired for the party's nomination, notably Dr. SKC Ogbonnia, Chief Charles Udeogaranya, and Alhaji Mumakai-Unagha, the incumbent President Muhammadu Buhari was selected as the sole candidate of the All Progressives Congress party primaries held on 29 September 2018 amidst charges of imposition.

==== Other candidates ====
- Chike Ukaegbu, founder of Startup52, is the presidential candidate of AAP.
- Donald Duke, a former governor of Cross River State, is the presidential candidate of the SDP.
- Fela Durotoye, motivational speaker and presidential candidate of Alliance for New Nigeria.
- Oby Ezekwesili, former Minister of Education and leader of the Bring Back Our Girls campaign. She ended her campaign on January 24, 2019 to combine support with other candidates to support a bid against APC and PDP.
- Tope Fasua, founder and National Chairman of the Abundant Nigeria Renewal Party.
- Rabiu Kwankwaso, former governor of Kano State.
- Sule Lamido, a former governor of Jigawa State.
- Ahmed Makarfi, former chairman of the People's Democratic Party National Caretaker Committee.
- Obadiah Mailafia, former Deputy Governor of the Central Bank of Nigeria and candidate of the African Democratic Congress.
- Kingsley Moghalu, former Deputy Governor of the CBN and Professor of Practice at Tufts University's Fletcher School of Law and Diplomacy.
- Gbenga Olawepo-Hashim, oil business mogul and presidential candidate for the Peoples Trust.
- Remi Sonaiya, member of the KOWA Party and former university lecturer.
- Omoyele Sowore, human rights activist, pro-democracy campaigner and publisher of news website Sahara Reporters.
- Kabiru Tanimu Turaki, former Minister of Special Duties.

=== Presidential debates ===
A presidential and vice-presidential debate was organised by the Nigerian Elections Debate Group (NEDG) and the Broadcasting Organisations of Nigeria (BON), with invitations extended to five of the 78 presidential candidates. The Debate Group explained the exclusion of other candidates as a measure to ensure the effectiveness of the debate and not an endorsement of the candidates chosen.

The vice presidential debate was held on 14 December 2018, at the Transcorp Hilton Hotels in Abuja. All invited vice presidential candidates were present, with candidates discussing health, education, security, economy and foreign affairs policies plans.

The presidential debate occurred on 19 January 2019, and took place at the same venue. The two leading presidential contestants were absent, with Atiku Abubakar leaving the venue upon discovering that Muhammadu Buhari was absent. Fela Durotoye (ANN), Oby Ezekwesili (ACPN) and Kingsley Moghalu (YPN) continued the debate, while criticising the absence of the others. Mark Eddo moderated the debate.

== Opinion polls ==
Poll source	Date	Sample size	Abubakar PDP	Buhari APC	Others	Notes
Seamfix	9 November 2018 – 4 January 2019	2,440	48%	25%	31%	
NigeriaVotes	19 November 2018 – 26 February 2019	11,326	32%	42%	26%	

== Conduct ==
Immediately following the elections, there were claims of widespread fraud by the opposition. The claims included accusations of ballot box snatching, vote-trading and impersonation. There were also claims that caches of explosives were found by police. PDP candidate Atiku Abubakar filed a case at the Nigerian electoral tribunal citing widespread irregularities in the polls . However the court dismissed his case, saying that Atiku has failed to prove widespread fraud committed by the electoral team of Buhari. The court also dismissed an allegation which said that Buhari lied about his academic background.

The African Union said the elections were "largely peaceful and conducive for the conducting of credible elections." The electoral commission also described the elections as mostly peaceful. On the contrary, US-based organisation Freedom House severely criticised the conduct, saying that they were marred by irregularities and intimidation.

== Misinformation ==
During the general election, reports indicated that both major political parties utilized their campaign headquarters to coordinate disinformation campaigns.

A highly viral video claimed that President Muhammadu Buhari had died and was replaced by a Sudanese body double, forcing a public denial.

In addition to national broadcast, Campaign teams shared out of context images such as claiming infrastructure projects in Rwanda were Nigerian public works and circulated digitally altered photos of foreign leaders to manufacture false political endorsements.

== Results ==
=== President ===
The results of the presidential election were announced in the early hours of 27 February 2019.

Candidate	Running mate	Party	Votes	%
Muhammadu Buhari	Yemi Osinbajo	All Progressives Congress	15,191,847	55.60
Atiku Abubakar	Peter Obi	People's Democratic Party	11,262,978	41.22
Felix Nicolas	Ado Baba	Peoples Coalition Party	110,196	0.40
Obadiah Mailafia	Nasiru Tanimowo Nurain Bolanle	African Democratic Congress	97,874	0.36
Gbor John Wilson Terwase	Gerald Chukwueke Ndudi	All Progressives Grand Alliance	66,851	0.24
Yabagi Sani	Olateru Olagbegi Martin Kunle	Action Democratic Party	54,930	0.20
Akhimien Davidson Isibor	Hamman Ibrahim Modibbo	Grassroots Development Party of Nigeria	41,852	0.15
Ibrahim Aliyu Hassan	Adeleke Adesoji Masilo Aderemi	African Peoples Alliance	36,866	0.13
Donald Duke	Shehu Musa Gabam	Social Democratic Party	34,746	0.13
Omoyele Sowore	Rufai Rabiu Ahmed	African Action Congress	33,953	0.12
Da-Silva Thomas Ayo	Muhammad Aisha Abubakar	Save Nigeria Congress	28,680	0.10
Shitu Mohammed Kabir	Olayemi Memunat Mahmud	Advanced Peoples Democratic Alliance	26,558	0.10
Yusuf Mamman Dantalle	Prince Duru Nwabueze	Allied Peoples' Movement	26,039	0.10
Kingsley Moghalu	Abdullahi Umma Getso	Young Progressives Party	21,886	0.08
Ameh Peter Ojonugwa	Edun Kehinde	Progressive Peoples Alliance	21,822	0.08
Isaac Babatunde Ositelu	Nafiu Muhammad Lawal	Accord Party	19,219	0.07
Fela Durotoye	Abdullahi Khadijah Iyah	Alliance for New Nigeria	16,779	0.06
Bashayi Isa Dansarki	Adepoju Oluwatoyin Grace	Masses Movement of Nigeria	14,540	0.05
Osakwe Felix Johnson	Mohammed Alhaji Ali	Democratic People's Party	14,483	0.05
Abdulrashid Hassan Baba	Uchendu Uju Peace Ozoka	Action Alliance	14,380	0.05
Nwokeafor Ikechukwu Ndubuisi	Ali Abdullahi	Advanced Congress of Democrats	11,325	0.04
Maina Maimuna Kyari	Oluwole Yetunde Folake	Northern People's Congress	10,081	0.04
Victor Okhai	Iyan Tama Hamisu Lamido	Providence Peoples Congress	8,979	0.03
Chike Ukaegbu	Safiya Ibrahim Ogoh	Advanced Allied Party	8,902	0.03
Oby Ezekwesili	Galadima Ganiyu Oseni	Allied Congress Party of Nigeria	7,223	0.03
Ibrahim Usman Alhaji	Nwafor-Orizu Onwa	National Rescue Movement	6,229	0.02
Ike Keke	Johnson Omede	New Nigeria People's Party	6,111	0.02
Moses Ayibiowu	Idoko Michael Emaiku	National Unity Party	5,323	0.02
Awosola Williams Olusola	Seiyefa Fetepigi	Democratic Peoples Congress	5,242	0.02
Muhammed Usman Zaki	Akpan Tom Ezekiel	Labour Party	5,074	0.02
Eke Samuel Chukwuma	Musa Hadiza Aruwa	Green Party of Nigeria	4,924	0.02
Nwachukwu Chuks Nwabuikwu	Tijjani Aisha Ali	All Grassroots Alliance	4,689	0.02
Hamza al-Mustapha	Opara Robert	Peoples Party of Nigeria	4,622	0.02
Shipi Moses Godia	Okwuanyasi Abiola Kika Shaliat	All Blended Party	4,523	0.02
Chris Okotie	Binutu Adefela Akinola	Fresh Democratic Party	4,554	0.02
Tope Fasua	Yakubu Aminu Zakari	Abundant Nigeria Renewal Party	4,340	0.02
Onwubuya	Ahmad Muhammad Nourayni	Freedom And Justice Party	4,174	0.02
Asukwo Mendie Archibong	Ite Donald-Ekpo	Nigeria For Democracy	4,096	0.01
Ahmed Buhari	Nwagu Kingsley Philip	Sustainable National Party	3,941	0.01
Salisu Yunusa Tanko	James Funmi	National Conscience Party	3,799	0.01
Shittu Moshood Asiwaju	Okere Evelyn	Alliance National Party	3,586	0.01
Obinna Uchechukwu Ikeagwuonu	Omotosho Emmanuel	All People's Party	3,585	0.01
Balogun Isiaka Ishola	Shuaibu Muhammad	United Democratic Party	3,170	0.01
Obaje Yusufu Ameh	Sule Olalekan Ganiyu	Advanced Nigeria Democratic Party	3,104	0.01
Chief Umenwa Godwin	Ibrahim Saheed Olaika	All Grand Alliance Party	3,071	0.01
Israel Nonyerem Davidson	Hassan Dawud Jidda	Reform and Advancement Party	2,972	0.01
Ukonga Frank	Musa Saidu Shuaibu	Democratic Alternative	2,769	0.01
Santuraki Hamisu	Ufondu Chinwe Florence	Mega Party of Nigeria	2,752	0.01
Funmilayo Adesanya-Davies	Mercy Olufunmilayo Ibeneme	Mass Action Joint Alliance	2,651	0.01
Gbenga Olawepo-Hashim	Agwuncha Nwankwo Arthur	Peoples Trust	2,613	0.01
Ali Soyode	Abdullahi Balkisu Mustapha	Yes Electorates Solidarity	2,394	0.01
Nsehe Nseobong	Abuh Mohammed	Restoration Party of Nigeria	2,388	0.01
Ojinika Geff Chizee	Yakubu Usman U.	Coalition for Change	2,391	0.01
Rabia Yasai Hassan Cengiz	Uhuegbu Chineme Justice	National Action Council	2,279	0.01
Eunice Atuejide	Bello Muhammad Jibril	National Interest Party	2,248	0.01
Dara John	Abubakar Salisu	Alliance of Social Democrats	2,146	0.01
Fagbenro-Byron Samuel Adesina	Ado Ummar Abbas	Kowa Party	1,911	0.01
Emmanuel Etim	Adeola Zainab Hazzan	Change Nigeria Party	1,874	0.01
Chukwu-Eguzolugo Sunday Chikendu	Salihu Iman Aliyu	Justice Must Prevail Party	1,853	0.01
Madu Nnamdi Edozie	Adamu Abubakar	Independent Democrats	1,845	0.01
Osuala Chukwudi John	Muhammad Falali	Re-build Nigeria Party	1,792	0.01
Albert Owuru Ambrose	Yahaya Shaba Haruna	Hope Democratic Party	1,663	0.01
David Esosa Ize-Iyamu	Kofar Mata Maryam Umar	Better Nigeria Progressive Party	1,649	0.01
Inwa Ahmed Sakil	Nkwocha Echemor Nkwocha	Unity Party of Nigeria	1,631	0.01
Akpua Robinson	Ahmadu Umaru	National Democratic Liberty Party	1,588	0.01
Mark Emmanuel Audu	Okeke Moses	United Patriots	1,561	0.01
Ishaka Paul Ofemile	Vincent Akinfelami Akinbanai	Nigeria Elements Progressive Party	1,524	0.01
Kriz David	Azael Vashi Chechera	Liberation Movement	1,438	0.01
Ademola Babatunde Abidemi	Tataji Aisha Asabe	Nigeria Community Movement Party	1,378	0.01
A. Edosomwan Johnson	Nasiru Mohammed	National Democratic Liberty Party	1,192	0.00
Angela Johnson	Zayyanu Abubakar	Alliance for a United Nigeria	1,092	0.00
Abah Lewis Elaigwu	Omohimua Michael Okojie	Change Advocacy Party	1,111	0.00
Nwangwu Uchenna Peter	Adebiwale Olaurewaju Odunlade	We The People Nigeria	732	0.00
Total			27,324,583	100.00
Valid votes			27,324,583	95.49
Invalid/blank votes			1,289,607	4.51
Total votes			28,614,190	100.00
Registered voters/turnout			82,344,107	34.75
Source: Independent National Electoral Commission

==== By geopolitical zone ====
Geopolitical zone	Muhammadu Buhari APC			Atiku Abubakar PDP			Felix Nicolas PCP		Obadiah Mailafia ADC		Gbor Terwase AAC		Others		Margin		Total valid votes
Geopolitical zone	Votes	%	T.	Votes	%	T.	Votes	%	Votes	%	Votes	%	Votes	%	Votes	%	Total valid votes
North Central (Note: Comprising the states of Benue, Kogi, Kwara, Nasarawa, Niger, and Plateau in addition to the Federal Capital Territory.)	2,465,599	53.59%	7	2,023,769	43.98%	7	19,028	0.41%	7,142	0.16%	7,316	0.16%	78,269	1.70%	441,830	9.60%	4,601,123
North East (Note: Comprising the states of Adamawa, Bauchi, Borno, Gombe, Taraba, and Yobe.)	3,238,783	70.68%	6	1,255,357	27.40%	2	11,444	0.25%	5,207	0.11%	1,916	0.04%	69,365	1.51%	1,983,426	43.29%	4,582,072
North West (Note: Comprising the states of Jigawa, Kaduna, Kano, Katsina, Kebbi, Sokoto, and Zamfara.)	5,995,651	71.18%	7	2,280,465	27.07%	3	17,953	0.21%	2,449	0.03%	3,048	0.04%	123,823	1.47%	3,715,186	44.11%	8,423,389
South East (Note: Comprising the states of Abia, Anambra, Ebonyi, Enugu, and Imo.)	403,968	18.19%	3	1,693,485	76.26%	5	14,720	0.66%	1,665	0.07%	52,392	2.36%	54,526	2.46%	−1,289,517	−58.07%	2,220,756
South South (Note: Comprising the states of Akwa Ibom, Bayelsa, Cross River, Delta, Edo, and Rivers.)	1,051,396	31.34%	5	2,233,232	66.56%	6	14,752	0.44%	4,156	0.12%	1,059	0.03%	50,486	1.50%	−1,181,836	−35.23%	3,355,081
South West (Note: Comprising the states of Ekiti, Lagos, Ogun, Ondo, Osun, and Oyo.)	1,051,397	49.16%	6	1,776,670	42.89%	6	29,389	0.71%	77,255	1.87%	1,120	0.03%	221,278	5.34%	259,780	6.27%	4,142,162
Total	15,191,847	55.60%	34	11,262,978	41.22%	29	107,286	0.39%	97,874	0.36%	66,851	0.24%	597,747	2.19%	3,928,869	14.38%	27,324,583

==== By state ====
State	Muhammadu Buhari APC			Atiku Abubakar PDP			Felix Nicolas PCP		Obadiah Mailafia ADC		Gbor Terwase AAC		Others		Margin		Total valid votes
State	Votes	%	T.	Votes	%	T.	Votes	%	Votes	%	Votes	%	Votes	%	Votes	%	Total valid votes
Abia	85,058	26.31%	1	219,698	67.96%	1	1,489	0.46%	336	0.10%	9,638	2.98%	7,072	2.19%	−134,640	−41.65%	323,291
Adamawa	378,078	46.59%	1	410,266	50.55%	1	3,670	0.45%	3,989	0.49%	159	0.02%	15,372	1.89%	−32,188	−3.97%	811,534
Akwa Ibom	175,429	30.31%	1	395,832	68.39%	1	1,902	0.33%	230	0.04%	61	0.01%	5,321	0.92%	−220,403	−38.08%	578,775
Anambra	33,298	5.50%	0	524,738	86.63%	1	4,374	0.72%	227	0.04%	30,034	4.96%	13,063	2.16%	−491,440	−81.13%	605,734
Bauchi	798,428	77.95%	1	209,313	20.43%	0	2,104	0.21%	296	0.03%	149	0.01%	14,017	1.37%	589,115	57.51%	1,024,307
Bayelsa	118,821	36.93%	1	197,933	61.51%	1	1,584	0.49%	1,078	0.34%	53	0.02%	2,298	0.71%	−79,112	−24.59%	321,767
Benue	347,668	47.70%	1	356,817	48.95%	1	2,793	0.38%	554	0.08%	4,582	0.63%	16,498	2.26%	−9,149	−1.26%	728,912
Borno	836,496	90.94%	1	71,788	7.80%	0	1,563	0.17%	301	0.03%	187	0.02%	9,451	1.03%	764,708	83.14%	919,786
Cross River	117,302	27.80%	1	295,737	70.10%	1	2,033	0.48%	326	0.08%	43	0.01%	6,460	1.53%	−178,435	−42.29%	421,901
Delta	221,292	26.67%	1	594,068	71.59%	1	2,753	0.33%	1,075	0.13%	145	0.02%	10,429	1.26%	−372,776	−44.93%	829,762
Ebonyi	90,726	25.26%	1	258,573	72.00%	1	1,637	0.46%	213	0.06%	222	0.06%	7,760	2.16%	−167,847	−46.74%	359,131
Edo	267,842	47.77%	1	275,691	49.17%	1	3,526	0.63%	850	0.15%	143	0.03%	12,659	2.26%	−7,849	−1.40%	560,711
Ekiti	219,231	57.52%	1	154,032	40.41%	1	2,299	0.60%	406	0.11%	39	0.01%	5,125	1.34%	65,199	17.11%	381,132
Enugu	54,423	12.93%	0	355,553	84.45%	1	2,337	0.56%	348	0.08%	1,618	0.38%	6,735	1.60%	−301,130	−71.52%	421,014
F.C.T.	152,224	35.91%	1	259,997	61.33%	1	2,921	0.69%	246	0.06%	255	0.06%	8,308	1.96%	−107,773	−25.42%	423,951
Gombe	402,961	72.71%	1	138,484	24.99%	0	1,679	0.30%	248	0.04%	124	0.02%	10,707	1.93%	264,477	47.72%	554,203
Imo	140,463	27.46%	1	334,923	65.47%	1	4,883	0.95%	541	0.11%	10,880	2.13%	19,896	3.89%	−194,460	−38.01%	511,586
Jigawa	794,738	71.84%	1	289,895	26.21%	1	2,761	0.25%	261	0.02%	140	0.01%	18,449	1.67%	504,843	45.64%	1,106,244
Kaduna	993,445	59.72%	1	649,612	39.05%	1	4,027	0.24%	558	0.03%	749	0.05%	15,212	0.91%	343,833	20.67%	1,663,603
Kano	1,464,768	77.45%	1	391,593	20.71%	0	3,568	0.19%	591	0.03%	549	0.03%	30,065	1.59%	1,073,175	56.75%	1,891,134
Katsina	1,232,133	79.21%	1	308,056	19.80%	0	2,399	0.15%	237	0.02%	331	0.02%	12,317	0.79%	924,077	59.41%	1,555,473
Kebbi	581,552	76.86%	1	154,282	20.39%	0	1,794	0.24%	285	0.04%	228	0.03%	18,464	2.44%	427,270	56.47%	756,605
Kogi	285,894	54.87%	1	218,207	41.88%	1	2,207	0.42%	4,369	0.84%	318	0.06%	10,021	1.92%	67,687	12.99%	521,016
Kwara	308,984	67.22%	1	138,184	30.06%	1	2,108	0.46%	456	0.10%	89	0.02%	9,855	2.14%	170,800	37.16%	459,676
Lagos	580,825	53.31%	1	448,015	41.12%	1	8,458	0.78%	2,915	0.27%	499	0.05%	48,855	4.48%	132,810	12.19%	1,089,567
Nasarawa	289,903	49.92%	1	283,847	48.87%	1	1,868	0.32%	339	0.06%	1,523	0.26%	3,298	0.57%	6,056	1.04%	580,778
Niger	612,371	71.88%	1	218,052	25.59%	1	2,855	0.34%	588	0.07%	389	0.05%	17,682	2.08%	394,319	46.28%	851,937
Ogun	281,762	49.94%	1	194,655	34.50%	1	3,563	0.63%	25,283	4.48%	222	0.04%	58,771	10.42%	87,107	15.44%	564,256
Ondo	241,769	43.48%	1	275,901	49.62%	1	4,829	0.87%	6,296	1.13%	90	0.02%	27,109	4.88%	−34,132	−6.14%	555,994
Osun	347,634	48.64%	1	337,377	47.21%	1	4,888	0.68%	1,525	0.21%	73	0.01%	23,185	3.24%	10,257	1.44%	714,682
Oyo	365,229	43.66%	1	366,690	43.83%	1	5,352	0.64%	40,830	4.88%	197	0.02%	58,233	6.96%	−1,461	−0.17%	836,531
Plateau	468,555	45.28%	1	548,665	53.02%	1	4,276	0.41%	590	0.06%	160	0.02%	12,607	1.22%	−80,110	−7.74%	1,034,853
Rivers	150,710	23.47%	0	473,971	73.81%	1	2,954	0.46%	597	0.09%	614	0.10%	13,319	2.07%	−323,261	−50.34%	642,165
Sokoto	490,333	56.24%	1	361,604	41.47%	1	2,630	0.30%	331	0.04%	313	0.04%	16,680	1.91%	128,729	14.76%	871,891
Taraba	324,906	45.58%	1	374,743	52.57%	1	321	0.05%	211	0.03%	1,071	0.15%	11,625	1.63%	−49,837	−6.99%	712,877
Yobe	497,914	89.01%	1	50,763	9.08%	0	2,107	0.38%	162	0.03%	226	0.04%	8,193	1.46%	447,151	79.94%	559,365
Zamfara	438,682	75.84%	1	125,423	21.68%	0	774	0.13%	186	0.03%	738	0.13%	12,636	2.18%	313,259	54.16%	578,439
Total	15,191,847	55.60%	34	11,262,978	41.22%	29	107,286	0.39%	97,874	0.36%	66,851	0.24%	597,747	2.19%	3,928,869	14.38%	27,324,583
	Buhari			Abubakar			Nicolas		Mailafia		Terwase		Others		Margin		Total
Source: BBC, This Day, Vanguard

===== Close states =====
States where the margin of victory was under 1%:

1. Oyo State, 0.17% (1,461 votes) margin for Abubakar

States where the margin of victory was between 1% and 5%:

1. Nasarawa State, 1.04% (6,056 votes) margin for Buhari
2. Benue State, 1.26% (9,149 votes) margin for Abubakar
3. Edo State, 1.40% (7,849 votes) margin for Abubakar
4. Osun State, 1.44% (10,257 votes) margin for Buhari
5. Adamawa State, 3.97% (32,188 votes) margin for Abubakar

States where the margin of victory was between 5% and 10%:

1. Ondo State, 6.14% (34,132 votes) margin for Abubakar
2. Taraba State, 6.99% (49,837 votes) margin for Abubakar
3. Plateau State, 7.74% (80,110 votes) margin for Abubakar

=== Senate ===
Senate President Bukola Saraki (PDP) was defeated in Kwara Central by the APC candidate.

Currently, 64 incumbent Senators will not be returning as members of the Ninth Senate, having been defeated during the elections. While the APC will have a simple majority of votes in the Senate, it will not have a supermajority (74 votes), meaning it cannot push through constitutional amendments on its own. Three Senate seats have yet to be filled.

Party	Seats	+/–
All Progressives Congress	63	+3
People's Democratic Party	45	–4
Young Progressives Party	1	New
Total	109	0
Source: INEC, INEC, Order Paper

=== House of Representatives ===
Party	Seats	+/–
All Progressives Congress	202	–10
People's Democratic Party	128	–12
All Progressives Grand Alliance	9	+4
African Democratic Congress	3	+4
Action Alliance	2	New
People's Redemption Party	2	+2
Action Democratic Party	1	New
Allied Peoples Movement	1	New
Labour Party	1	0
Social Democratic Party	1	0
Vacant	10	+10
Total	360	0
Source: INEC, Order Paper

=== Governors ===
On 2 March 2019, elections were held for governors of 29 of the 36 states of Nigeria. Elections were suspended on the original date in Rivers State. They were later held on April 3, where the INEC declared that incumbent Wike won re-election.

Party	Seats
All Progressives Congress	16
People's Democratic Party	15
No election held	5
Total	36
Source: INEC
