= Adetiba =

- Gender: Male
- Language(s): Yoruba

Origin
- Word/name: Nigeria
- Meaning: Royalty

Adetiba is a surname. Notable people with the surname include:

- Kemi Adetiba (born 1980), Nigerian filmmaker
- Mayen Adetiba (born 1954), Nigerian actress
