= Durotoye =

Nigerian given name

- Gender: Male
- Language: Yoruba

Origin
- Origin: Nigeria
- Meaning: Wait with royalty.
- Region of origin: South West, Nigeria

Durotoye (audio) is a Nigerian male given name and surname of Yoruba origin. It means "Wait with royalty.

Notable individuals with the name include:

- Fela Durotoye (born 12 May 1971), businessman and politician
- Tara Fela-Durotoye (born 6 March 1977), Nigerian beauty entrepreneur and lawyer
