= Oby Ezekwesili =

Nigerian accountant and politician

CFR Obiageli Katryn Ezekwesili
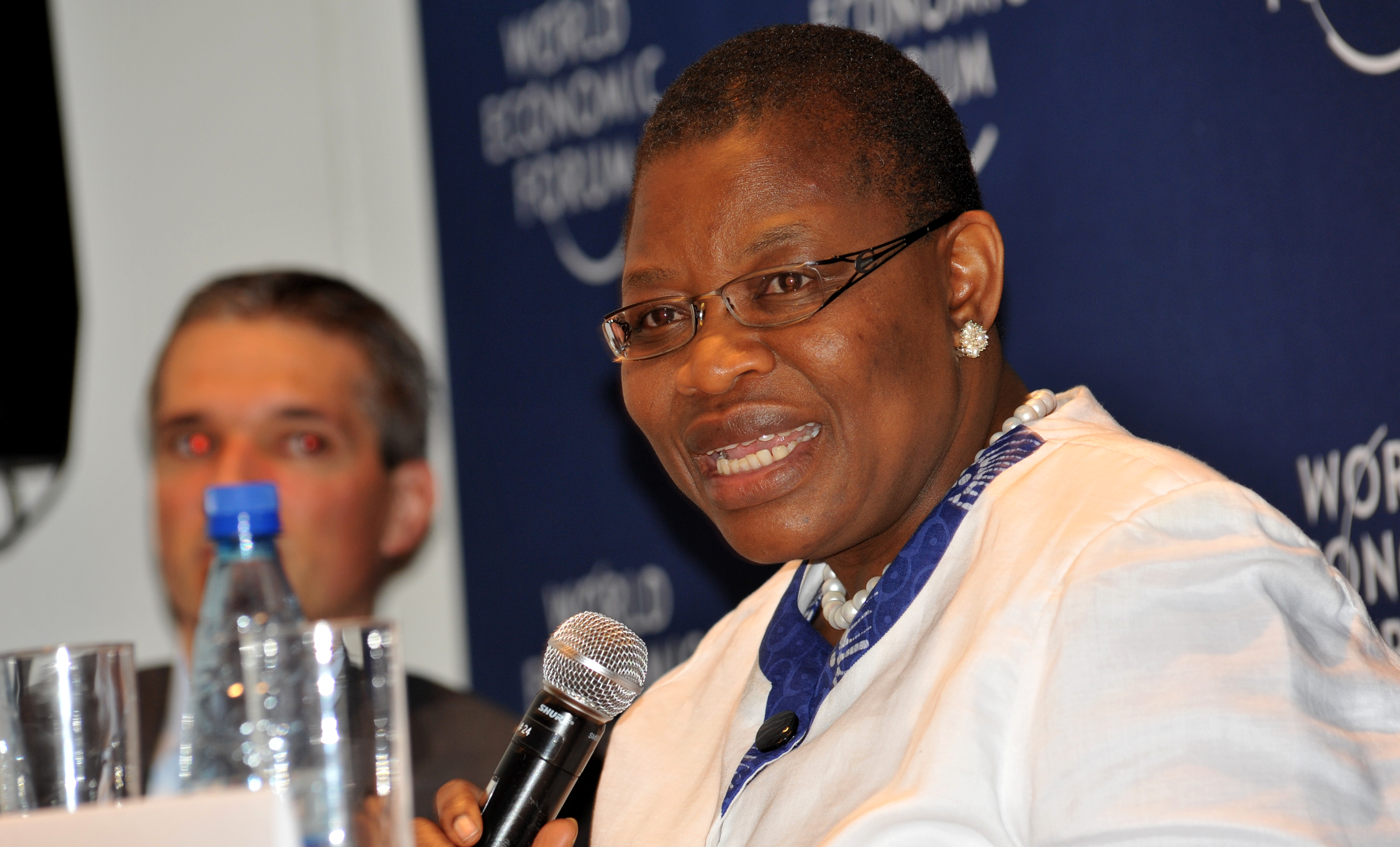

Federal Minister of Solid Minerals, Nigeria
- In office June 2005 – June 2006
- Preceded by: Odion Ugbesia
- Succeeded by: Leslye Obiora

Federal Minister of Education, Nigeria
- In office June 2006 – April 2007
- Preceded by: Chinwe Obaji
- Succeeded by: Abba Sayyadi Ruma

Personal details
- Born: 28 April 1963 (age 63) Anambra State, Nigeria
- Spouse: Chinedu Ezekwesili
- Children: 3
- Education: Harvard Kennedy School; University of Lagos; University of Nigeria, Nsukka
- Profession: Chartered accountant, economic policy
- Nickname: 'Madam Due Process'

Obiageli "Oby" Ezekwesili // (born 28 April 1963) is a Nigerian economic policy expert, advocate for transparency, accountability, good governance and human capital development, humanitarian and activist. She is a former vice president for the World Bank (Africa region), co-founder and founding director of Transparency International, co-founder of the #BringBackOurGirls movement and has served twice as a federal minister in Nigeria. She is also the founder of #FixPolitics Initiative, a research-based citizen-led initiative, the School of Politics Policy and Governance (SPPG), and Human Capital Africa.

Fondly called "Oby", Ezekwesili is a member of the board of directors of Women Political Leaders, a member of the Fundacao Dom Cabral, and the chairperson of the board of trustees of Ehizua Hub.

Ezekwesili is also a chartered accountant, public analyst, and senior economic adviser from Anambra State.

== Early life and education ==
Ezekwesili was born in Lagos State to Benjamin Ujubuonu, who died in 1988, and Cecilia Nwayiaka Ujubuonu.

Ezekwesili holds a bachelor's degree from the University of Nigeria, Nsukka, master's degree in international law and diplomacy from the University of Lagos, and a Master of Public Administration degree from the Harvard Kennedy School at Harvard University. She trained with the firm of Deloitte and Touche and qualified as a chartered accountant.

Prior to working for the Government of Nigeria, Ezekwesiili worked with Professor Jeffrey Sachs at the Center for International Development at Harvard as the director of the Harvard-Nigeria Economic Strategy Project.

== Career ==
Ezekwesili served as Federal Minister of Solid Minerals and later as Federal Minister of Education. From May 2007 to May 2012, she served as vice president for Africa at the World Bank. She was succeeded by Makhtar Diop.

She is a senior fellow at Yale Jackson School of Global Affairs.

=== Transparency International 1994-1999 ===
She was a co-founder of Transparency International, serving as one of the pioneer directors of the global anti-corruption body based in Berlin, Germany.

=== 1999-2007 ===
Ezekwesili started in the Olusegun Obasanjo administration as the pioneer head of the Budget Monitoring and Price Intelligence Unit (also known as the Due Process Unit). It was in this position that she earned the sobriquet of "Madam Due Process" for her work of leading a team of professionals to sanitize the public procurement and contracting processes at the federal level in Nigeria. She was the architect of the Bureau for Public Procurement legislation, the Nigeria Extractive Industries Transparency Initiative (NEITI) legislation, and the new Minerals and Mining legislation during her six and a half year tenure in government.

==== Minister of Solid Minerals ====
In June 2005, Ezekwesili was appointed Minister of Solid Minerals (Mines and Steel), where she led a reform program that led to Nigeria's global recognition as a credible mining investment destination. She was also the chairperson of the NEITI, and led the first national implementation of the global standards and principles of transparency in the oil, gas and mining sector.

==== Minister of Education ====
In June 2006, Ezekwesili was appointed the Federal Minister of Education, a post she held until she took up a World Bank appointment in May 2007.

While in government, Ezekwesili led the restructuring and refocusing of the Ministry of Education for the attainment of Education for All (EfA) targets and Millennium Development Goals. She also introduced public-private partnerships for education service delivery, revamped the Federal Inspectorate Service as an improved quality assurance mechanism, and introduced transparency and accountability mechanisms for better governance of the budget.

=== Vice president, World Bank's Africa region ===
In March 2007, World Bank President Paul Wolfowitz announced the appointment of Ezekwesili as vice president for the Africa region starting on 1 May 2007.

In 2012, she successfully completed her tenure as vice president for the World Bank's Africa region. As vice president, she was in charge of the bank's operations of 48 countries in Sub-Saharan Africa and supervised a lending portfolio of over $40 billion.

== Later career ==
As a senior economic advisor for Open Society, a group founded by George Soros, Ezekwesili advised nine reform-committed African heads of state including Paul Kagame of Rwanda and Ellen Johnson-Sirleaf of Liberia.

=== Board memberships ===
On 1 October 2012, telecommunications firm, Bharti Airtel, with operations in 20 countries, named Ezekwesili as a director on its board. She also served on the boards of World Wildlife Fund, the School of Public Policy of Central European University, the Harold Hartog School of Government and Policy, New African magazine, Women Political Leaders, Fundacao Dom Cabral and the Center for Global Leadership Tufts University. In April 2020, she was appointed to the board of trustees of the International Bureau of Fiscal Documentation where she contributes to overseeing their expansion in developing economies. She is also the co-chair of the World Economic Forum Africa Regional Stewardship Board.

In January 2019, Ezekwesili was appointed on the advisory board of directors of Nexford University in Washington DC and subsequently launched a scholarship program dedicated to women in Nigeria. In December 2021, Nexford University appointed her as a member of its board of directors.

She is also the senior economic adviser to the Africa Economic Development Policy Initiative and a member of the advisory board of the Institute for State Effectiveness.

=== Advocacy and #BringBackOurGirls campaign ===
In March 2014, Ezekwesili delivered a speech at the national summit of the All Progressives Congress (APC), Nigeria's leading opposition party. She criticized the many cross-carpeting governors and urged the party to have "a conversation deeper than how you're going to chase (the ruling) PDP out of power".

After nearly 300 mainly Christian girls were abducted from Chibok by the Islamist militant group Boko Haram, Ezekwesili used the Bring Back Our Girls (BBOG) advocacy group to draw global attention to the plight of all persons who have been abducted by terrorists from Nigeria's war ravaged northeast region. She was instrumental to the start of the viral #Advocacy and #BringBackOurGirls Campaign on social media, which trended internationally. On 23 April, at the opening ceremony for a UNESCO event honoring Port Harcourt as the 2014 World Book Capital, she urged Nigerians not only to tweet but actively participate in efforts to "bring back our girls".

As she prepared to board a British Airways flight to London to appear on the BBC programme Hard Talk in July 2014, she was detained by Nigeria's secret service, the SSS, who also seized her passport. She was later released the same morning.

She is the founder and convener of the #RedCardMovement.

== 2019 presidential election ==
Ezekwesili contested for the office of the president of Nigeria on the platform of the Allied Congress Party of Nigeria (ACPN). The former minister had hinted at contesting for the office of the president. At an event commemorating the 58th anniversary of Nigeria's independence, Pastor Tunde Bakare announced that she would be running for the office of the president. One of her campaign promises was to lift 80 million Nigerians out of poverty.

On 24 January 2019, Ezekwesili withdrew from the presidential race, owing to a divergence of values and visions with her political party. However, later in the day, the Independent National Electoral Commission said it was too late for anyone to withdraw from the race because the ballot materials had already been prepared. For that reason, the crest of the party would still appear. Fela Durotoye commended Ezekwesili for taking the lead and clamouring for a coalition to end the rule of #APCPDP.

On 4 February 2019, Ezekwesili organised a press conference in NICON Luxury Hall, Abuja. She spoke during her press conference about her rough political journey while campaigning for the office of the President of Nigeria under the Allied Congress Party of Nigeria (ACPN). She also gave a motivational speech as she stepped down from the 2019 presidential campaign.

On 7 February 2019, Ezekwesili published her campaign finances. The report shows she spent 48 million Naira between 1 October 2018 and 2 February 2019.

== Personal life ==
Oby is married to Pastor Chinedu Ezekwesili of the Redeemed Christian Church of God (RCCG) and has three sons: Chinemelum, Chinweuba and Chidera.

In April 2021, Ezekwesili submitted a petition to the Inspector General of Police against Japhet Omojuwa, accusing him of fraudulently using her name as a director in his firm, Alpha Reach Company Limited.

== Awards and recognition ==
- In 2006, Ezekwesili was conferred the national award of Commander of the Order of the Federal Republic (CFR).
- In May 2012, Ezekwesili received an honorary Doctor of Science (DSC) degree by the University of Agriculture, Abeokuta in Nigeria. She was selected as one of the BBC's 100 Women in 2013 and 2014.
- In December 2012, Ezekwesili was named by the New African magazine as one of the 100 Most Influential Africans.
- In December 2014, Ezekwesili was named again among the 2014 most influential Africans - Civil Society and Activism by the New African magazine.
- In March 2016, Ezekwesili won the 2016 New Africa Women award.
- In July 2016, Ezekwesili received an honorary graduate degree by the University of Essex, United Kingdom, where she presented an inspiring and impassioned speech to the graduating students.
- In March 2019, Ezekwesili won the Forbes Woman Africa Social Influencer Award for her efforts on the #BringBackOurGirls campaign on social media.
- In 2019, she was awarded a Richard Von Weizsäcker Fellowship at the Robert Bosch Academy in Berlin.
- She was selected as a 2020 Global Leadership Awards honoree. Also named as one of 100 visionaries featured in the 3D book "Genius:100 Visionary Thinkers launched in Montreal, Canada in 2017 by Albert Einstein's Foundations.
- In 2020, she was invested as a global leader by the Vital Voices Global leadership awards.
- She was recognized by Time magazine as one of its 100 Most Influential People and by the New York Times as one of the 25 Women of Impact for 2015.
- She holds the Robert F. Kennedy Award for Excellence in Public Service of the Harvard Kennedy School of Government, and the Tuft University EPIIC Jean Meyer Award. She is a Democracy Ambassador -International IDEA, and a 2018 Nobel Peace Prize nominee.
- She is one of the 100 Genius Visionaries inducted by the Genius 100 Foundation.
- In August 2021, Ezekwesili joined Yale University's Jackson School of Global Affairs as a senior fellow.
- On May 20, 2022, Ezekwesili received the Most Impactful Woman of the Year Award, hosted by The Women of Inestimable Values Foundation Impact Makers Award to celebrate impact makers across the world.
