= 2007 Kwara State gubernatorial election =

State election in Nigeria

- April 14, 2007
| Nominee | Bukola Saraki | Gbenga Olawepo-Hashim |
| Party | PDP | DPP |
| Popular vote | 572,938 | 63,743 |
Governor before election
Bukola Saraki
PDP
Elected Governor
Bukola Saraki
PDP

The 2007 Kwara State gubernatorial election was the 6th gubernatorial election of Kwara State. Held on April 14, 2007, the People's Democratic Party nominee Bukola Saraki won the election, defeating Gbenga Olawepo-Hashim of the Democratic People's Party.

== Results ==
Bukola Saraki from the People's Democratic Party won the election, defeating Gbenga Olawepo-Hashim from the Democratic People's Party. Registered voters was 1,216,478.

2007 Kwara State gubernatorial election
| Party | Candidate | Votes | % | ±% |
|---|---|---|---|---|
| PDP | Bukola Saraki | 572,938 | 0 | |
| DPP | Gbenga Olawepo-Hashim | 63,743 | 0 | |
| PDP hold | | | | |
