= John Ugbe =

Nigerian business executive

John Ugbe is a Nigerian business executive. He is the chief executive officer at MultiChoice Nigeria. He was the chairman of the Broadcasting Organization of Nigeria till November 2023.

== Education ==
He studied Electrical and Electronics Engineering at Federal University of Technology Owerri. He got his Master's in Business Administration from the University of Liverpool.

== Career ==
In 1998, John joined MultiChoice Nigeria as a help desk analyst. He moved to MWEB where he worked as an IT Manager between 2003 and 2006.

In March 2006, he became the General Manager of MWEB Nigeria and joined iWayAfrica Nigeria in 2007. He returned to MultiChoice to serve as managing director in October 2011.

Under his leadership, MultiChoice rolled out three channels in three local Nigerian languages on Africa Magic, introduced GOtv, MultiChoice Talent Factory and Africa Magic Viewers’ Choice Awards.

John was elected chairman of the Broadcasting Organization of Nigeria in October 2021.

== Awards ==
2020 - CEO Of The Year (Media & Entertainment), BrandCom Awards.

== Personal life ==
John Ugbe is married and has two sons with his wife.
