= Dance Go (Eau de Vie) =

2014 single by Wizkid and 2Face Idibia

Promotional single by Wizkid and 2Face Idibia

from the album Face 2 Face 10.0
- Released: 2 October 2014
- Recorded: 2014
- Genre: Afropop
- Length: 3:48
- Songwriters: Ayodeji Balogun, Innocent Ujah Idibia
- Producer: Sarz

Music video
- "Dance Go (Eau de Vie)" on YouTube

"Dance Go (Eau de Vie)" is a theme song recorded by Nigerian singers Wizkid and 2Face Idibia. The song premiered on the Beat 99.9 FM and was released to promote the Hennessy brand in Nigeria.

== Promotion and music video ==
To promote their brand, Hennessy launched the "Hennessy Artistry African Tour", a one-night only event held in several parts of Nigeria, Johannesburg and Accra. The event featured live performances from WizKid, 2face Idibia, Patoranking, Mafikizolo and MzVee.

The music video for "Dance Go (Eau de Vie)" was shot in Nigeria by Kemi Adetiba. It was released through the video sharing website YouTube on 5 February 2015.

== Accolades ==
Awards and nominations for "Dance Go (Eau de Vie)"
Organization	Year	Category	Result	Ref.
COSON Song Awards	2015	Best Collabo	Nominated	

== Track listing ==
Digital single

No.	Title	Writer(s)	Producer(s)	Length
1.	"Dance Go (Eau de Vie)" (featuring Wizkid and 2Face Idibia)	Ayodeji Balogun, Innocent Ujah Idibia	Sarz	3:48
