= Retail Systems Research =

- Company type: Private company
- Industry: Research
- Headquarters: Miami, Florida; United States
- Products: Research
- Website: www.rsrresearch.com

Retail Systems Research, or RSR is an American market intelligence company focused on the impact of technology on the retail industry.

RSR research has been mentioned by news institutions including The Economist, The Wall Street Journal, USA Today, and National Public Radio, as well as in industry publications such as RetailWire, Retailers Magazine, and Chain Store Age.

RSR's partners, Nikki Baird, Paula Rosenblum, Steve Rowen, and Brian Kilcourse are considered influencers in the industry, contributing to Forbes.com and giving interviews as subject-matter experts.

Nikki Baird left the company in January 2018.

Their research is also cited in books and publications.

== See also ==
Price intelligence
