= Obadiah Mailafia =

Nigerian politician (1956–2021)

Deputy Governor of the Central Bank of Nigeria
- In office 5 May 2005 – 26 March 2007

Personal details
- Born: 24 December 1956 Randa, Nigeria
- Died: 19 September 2021 (aged 64) Abuja, Nigeria
- Party: African Democratic Congress (2018–2021)
- Education: Ahmadu Bello University; University of Oxford, Oriel College, DPhil Oxon
- Website: mailafia.com

Obadiah Mailafia (24 December 1956 – 19 September 2021) was a Nigerian development economist and the 2019 Nigeria Presidential election Candidate of African Democratic Congress (ADC). He was a former official of the African Development Bank Group and one-time Deputy Governor of the Central Bank of Nigeria (CBN). He was also the Chief of Staff of the African, Caribbean and Pacific Group of States (ACP), the 79-nation multilateral development institution based in Brussels, Belgium.

== Early life and education ==
Mailafia was born on 24 December 1956 in the village of Randa in Sanga Local Government Area of Kaduna State. His father Baba Mailafia Gambo Galadima was an Evangelist with the Evangelical Reformed Church of Central Nigeria (ERCC). Mailafia was raised as a missionary child in a multiracial environment. His parents later transferred to Murya, Lafia, in Nasarawa State, where he grew up.

He started his elementary education at Musha Sudan United Mission School from 1964 to 1969 and proceeded to Mada Hills Secondary School, Akwanga from 1970 to 1974. He won the Commissioner of Education's Award and for his 'A' Levels, he attended the School of Basic Studies (SBS) at Ahmadu Bello University, Zaria, between 1974 and 1975. He later graduated Ahmadu Bello University, Zaria, in 1978 with a B.Sc. Honours Social Sciences degree (Politics, Economics and Sociology). He also has a M.Sc. from the same institution. He subsequently applied for a French Government Scholarship to France, where he earned a Certificate in French Language and Civilization from the University of Clermont-Ferrand in 1985. In 1986 he also earned the Diplôme (equivalent to an M.Phil.) in International economics from the Institut International d’Administration Public (IIAP), the international wing and sister institution of the prestigious École Nationale d'Administration (ENA) of France.

Mailafia later went to the United Kingdom as a Foreign and Commonwealth Office scholar at Oriel College, obtaining a DPhil from the University of Oxford in 1995.

== Career ==
Mailafia began his career teaching Government and Economics at Akoko Anglican Grammar School, Arigidi-Ikare in Ondo State, Nigeria between 1978 and 1979 as part of his primary assignment during his obligatory National Youth Service Corps year. After national service he returned to Ahmadu Bello University, as a Graduate Assistant in the Faculty of Arts and Social Sciences from 1980 to 1982. During this period he lectured undergraduates and was also Research Assistant to Professor Ibrahim Gambari, who later became Foreign Minister and subsequently United Nations adviser for Political Affairs.

From 1982 to 1989, Mailafia was a Fellow and sometime Acting Research Director of the National Institute for Policy and Strategic Studies (NIPSS). He was on the team that prepared a special report on Local Government Reforms during 1982–1983. He also co-authored a report on the Maitatsine Religious Riots that formed the bedrock of the government's response to the crisis (1984). In collaboration with Professors Adedotun Phillips and Eghosa Osagie, he prepared several technical papers advising the Nigerian government on economic policy and macroeconomic reforms. He served on a committee that advised the Federal Military Government on a peaceful approach to the Nigeria-Cameroon Bakassi Peninsula Dispute. It helped in avoiding a catastrophic war between the two neighboring countries. At the National Institute he came under the mentorship of illustrious Nigerians who have spurred his interests in public service: Chief Simeon Adebo, Pius Okigbo, Eme Awa, Olikoye Ransome-Kuti, Gidado Idris, Akinola Aguda, Moshood Kashimawo Abiola and Claude Ake.

From 1990 to 1995, Mailafia was resident tutor and lecturer in the economics and politics of developing areas at Plater College Oxford at the time an associate college of the University of Oxford. During 1995–1996 he was an assistant professor at New England College, Arundel, the foreign academic programme of New England College. He was subsequently a lecturer in international finance at Richmond Business School, the American International University in London (1997–1998). He then had to move to Regents Business School London (1998–2000).

From 2001 to 2005, Mailafia served as a chief economist in the Strategic Planning and Budgeting Department of the African Development Bank Group. He served both in Abidjan and in Tunis when the bank was temporarily relocated to Tunisia. In this capacity he was on several missions throughout Africa to supervise projects in power and infrastructures, agriculture industry. He was also the task manager for coordinating grants to research institutions throughout Africa, including such institutions as the Council for Social Science Research, African Economic Research Consortium (AERC) and the African Capacity Development Foundation (ACBF). He drafted the Concept Note that was later adopted by the board of the AFDB, leading to the establishment of New Partnership for Africa's Development (NEPAD) and was also a Member of the AfDB and the United Nations Economic Commission of Africa (UNECA) Joint Committee that provided technical support to the steering committee of the heads of state and government on the establishment of NEPAD and its secretariat.

Mailafia was secretary to the senior management committee and special negotiating team for the Ninth Replenishment of the African Development Fund and a member of the task force for the joint management of the HIPC Trust Fund, in coordination with the World Bank and the International Monetary Fund (IMF).

From 2005 to 2007, Mailafia served as Deputy Governor of the Central Bank of Nigeria (CBN). In this capacity he served as a member of the board of directors of the bank and was principally responsible for managing monetary policy, economic policy, research and statistics and liaison with regional and international bodies, including the IMF and the World Bank. He was a principal actor in the banking consolidation exercise of 2005–2006 that led to the reform of the Nigerian banking sector. He oversaw the reduction of the number of commercial banks, through mergers and acquisitions, from 89 to 25 consolidated banks; an exercise that was widely regarded as one of the most successful such efforts anywhere in the developing world in recent times.

From 2010 to 2015, Mailafia was the Chief of Staff (Chef de Cabinet) to the 79-member nation African, Caribbean and Pacific (ACP) Group of States based in Brussels, Belgium. In this capacity he was the most senior adviser to the Secretary-General, overseeing the strategic management function; liaising with external partners such as the European Commission, European Parliament, European Investment Bank (EIB), UN agencies and the IMF and World Bank. He was involved in managing a portfolio of €22 billion of EU funding for ACP countries under the 10th European Development Fund (EDF) and €31.5 billion for the 11th European Development Fund covering the years 2015–2020.

Mailafia was also in liaison with the European Investment Bank (EIB) on the management of €5 billion Intra-ACP Resources Fund being managed by the EIB, comprising the Africa Infrastructure Fund and the ACP-EIB Investment Facility. He was also the chair of the ACP Strategic Management Group and the draftsman for the Secretariat's Strategic Plan, Renewal and Transformation (2011–2014).

== Controversial views ==
On August 20, 2020, Mailafia while appearing as a guest on a local radio claimed that he was in the know that some former Boko Haram fighters confessed that one of the country's northern governors was the commander of the terrorist group. Three days later, the country's media watchdog, the NBC, slammed the station for "[providing] its platform for the guest, Dr Mailafia Obadiah, to promote unverifiable and inciting views that could encourage or incite to crime and lead to public disorder", and fined it the sum of ₦5m. Several weeks later, Nigeria's secret police, the SSS, invited Mailafia to its office to offer clarification on his claims and the national polic also said he was under criminal investigation. In response, Mailafia granted an interview to a newspaper saying that his life was in danger and that "powerful political forces want to silence me forever for speaking the truth".

== Political career ==
Mailafia ran for presidency of the Federal Republic of Nigeria in the 2019 presidential elections under the platform of the African Democratic Congress (ADC). He entered politics after the famous historic “handshake” by the coalition of the Middle Belt Forum (MBF) and the South Afenifere of Yoruba land, Ohanaeze Ndigbo and PANDEF of Niger Delta.

== Death ==
Mailafia died from COVID-19 19 September 2021 at the National Hospital, Abuja, Nigeria.

== Selected publications ==
- Mailafia, O. Europe and Economic Reform in Africa: Structural Adjustment and Economic Diplomacy (400-page textbook), New York and London: Routledge, 1997;
- Mailafia, O. ”The Social Character of Nigerian Diplomats,” in Sunny G. Tyoden (ed.), Essays on Nigerian Foreign Policy, National Institute Press, 2007.
- Mailafia, O. (ed.) Challenges and Opportunities in the Nigerian Economy (edited), NIPSS Press, 1989.
- Mailafia, O. “Human Rights and Global Distributive Justice”, Anikpo & G. Shepherd (ed.) Emerging Human Rights: African Political Economy Context, New York: Greenwood 1990.
- Mailafia, O., Capital Markets Liberalization in Developing Economies: Theories and Evidence, Text of paper delivered at the CBN Senior Executive Seminar held in Calabar, February 2007.
- Mailafia, O., “Economic Reform in Nigeria: Lessons from the Asia Pacific,” in Paul Collier and Charles Soludo (eds.), Economic Reform and Policy Choice in Nigeria, Oxford University Press (forthcoming).
- Mailafia, O. “Industrial Policy in Nigeria: Report Submitted to the International Group on Industrial Policy in Middle and Low-Income Countries, Sponsored by the German Ministry for Development Cooperation, Bonn, Germany, German Institute for Development, December 2009.
- Mailafia, O. “The Prospects for Democracy in Central and West Africa", “Paper Prepared for the Commonwealth Foundation", London, June 2010.
- Mailafia, O., Europe Seen from Africa, book chapter contribution in Stefan Schepers & Andrew Kakabadze (eds.), Rethinking the Future of Europe: A Challenge of Governance, London: Palgrave Macmillan, 2014.
- Mailafia, O., Fighting Corruption and Growing a Sustainable Nigerian Economy, Being Text of Federal Corporation of Nigeria (FRCN) Annual October Lecture, Abuja, Thursday 27 October 2016.
