= Emmanuel Etim =

Nigerian politician and clergyman

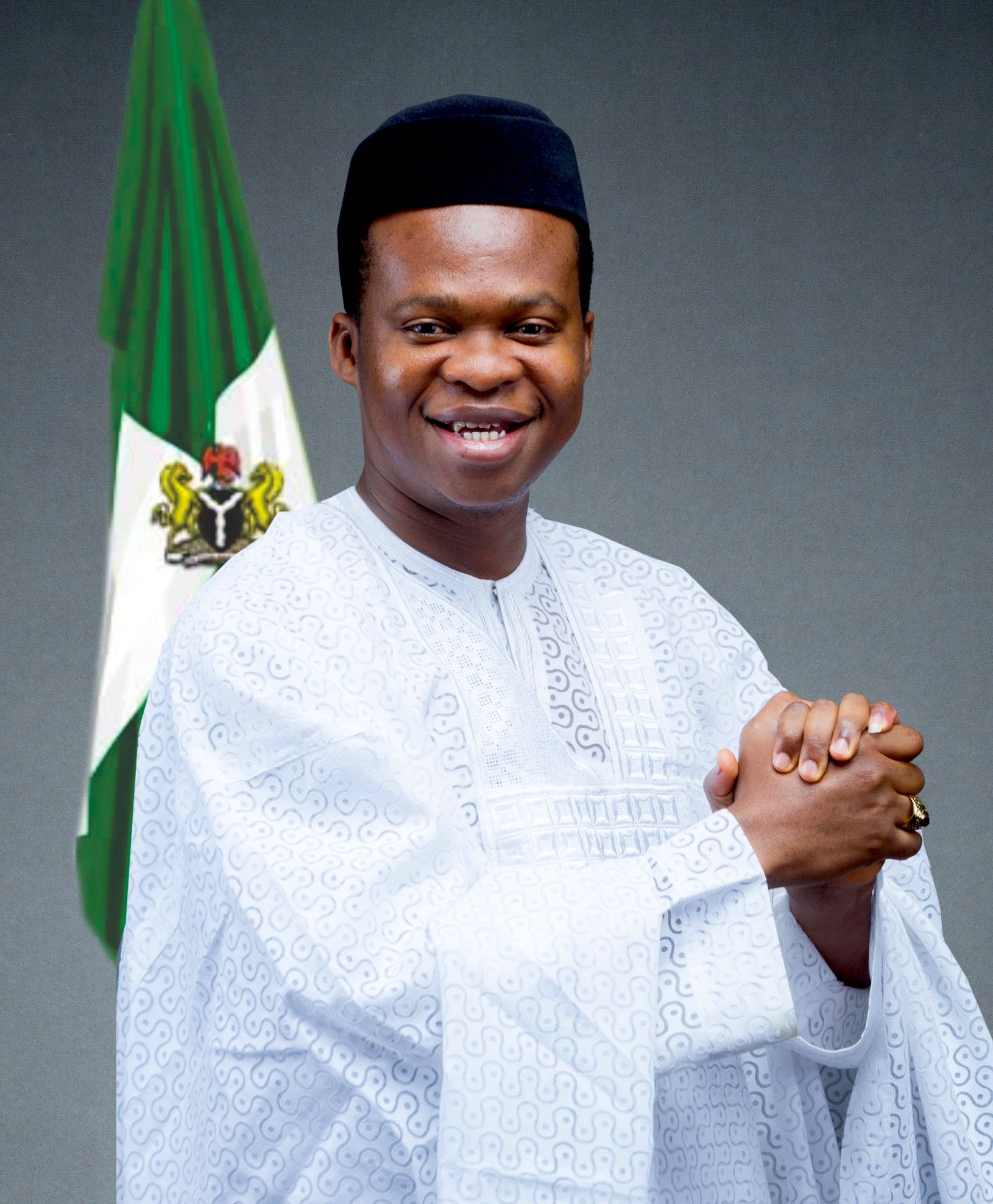
- Emmanuel Etim

Presidential Candidate CNP

Personal details
- Party: Change Nigeria Party
- Website: www.etimforpresident.com

Emmanuel Ishie Etim (Im·man·u·el \i-ˈman-yə-wəl, -yəl\, born April 6, 1980) is a clergyman and Nigerian politician who was a presidential candidate in the 2019 Nigerian general election. A member of the Change Nigeria Party (CNP), Etim decided to contest the presidential election after the Not Too Young To Run Act was signed into law. On July 5, 2018, Etim declared his candidacy and picked up his nomination form on the New Progressive Movement (NPM) party platform, but hours to the party primaries, the party leadership called off the presidential primaries. Etim decided to run on the Change Nigeria Party platform and on October 5, 2018, after the party primaries was conducted, he emerged the winner and was announced as the Presidential Candidate for Change Nigeria Party (CNP).

== Career ==
Etim first rose to National prominence when he delivered a poignant speech at the 1995 National Youth forum in preparatory for the Beijing Women's Conference. In 2010, Etim was listed among the 50 most influential young people who will change Nigeria due to Etim's significant contributions on the implementation of people centered domestic policy in universal human rights, accessible and affordable universal health care coverage, meaningful employment creation, profitable entrepreneurship, business growth, fighting inequality and ensuring political inclusion for women and youth. Etim worked for five years at the African Union as Senior Technical Adviser, Global partnerships and Program implementation(2008–2013), during which he conceptualized, established and resourced the African Union Young Professionals Program and Youth Volunteer Corps (AUYVC). In 2013 the office of the President of Nigeria endowed him with the Guardian of the Future of Africa award. Etim is a multiple time winner of the Future Africa Awards for Best Use of Advocacy and Best Use of Public Office. Between 2012 and 2015 he was part of the key non-state leaders from African supporting the group of G77 negotiators advancing Africa's common position towards the adoption of the Sustainable Development Goals (SDG's). In 2016, Etim was invited to serve as a Member of the Commonwealth Advisory Panel for the Youth Development Index.

== Personal life ==
Emmanuel Etim was born to Chief Ishie Henry Etim and late Mrs Veronica Afakhame Etim on Easter Sunday, April 6, 1980, in Lagos, Nigeria. In his childhood years from 1990 to 1993 following his love for singing, Etim joined and was an active member of the choir at the Festac Town parish of the Presbyterian Church of Nigeria. It was during 1994 to 1997 while in senior secondary school when he got exposed to the Nigerian Youth AIDS Programme (NYAP) through which he engaged as a peer health educator. Etim then set up an NGO called Adolescents in Nigeria (AIN) which was registered with the Cross River State Ministry of Youth and Sports. A few years later, he renamed Adolescents in Nigeria (AIN) into the Center for Development Action, an Institute for Youth Studies and Development Research, which has now been reformed into the Pan African Centre for Social Development and Accountability (PACSDA).

== Bibliography ==
- Deep Conversations with the Holy Spirit, 2018
- What Next?After you become a Christian(Born Again), 2018
- God Punish the Poor?!; 2018
