= Tope Fasua =

Nigerian politician (born 1971)

- Born: Tope Kolade Fasua; 11 September 1971 (age 54); Lagos, Lagos State, Nigeria
- Occupations: Businessman, Economist, Writer and Political Reformer

Tope Kolade Fasua (born 11 September 1971) is a Nigerian entrepreneur, economist, politician, and writer. He is the special adviser to President Bola Tinubu on economic affairs. He was the 2019 Nigeria presidential candidate for Abundant Nigeria Renewal Party (ANRP). He is the founder and CEO of Global Analytics Consulting Limited, an international consulting firm with headquarters in Abuja, Nigeria. As a political reformer, he founded the ANRP and got elected in February 2018 to serve as the national chairman of the party. Fasua has authored newspaper columns and 11 books.

== Early life ==
Fasua was born on 11 September 1971 in Lagos State, Nigeria. He attended Army Comprehensive High School in his hometown Akure in 1985 before he studied economics at Ondo State University, where he graduated and earned an award for the best overall result in the department, faculty, and entire school in 1991. In 1996, Fasua became a qualified accountant after attending the Institute of Chartered Accountants of Nigeria to earn ACA (Associate Chartered Accountant). Between Fasua's movement from his banking practice to starting his consulting firm, he attended London Metropolitan University to gain a master's degree in Financial Markets and Derivatives in which he earned Distinction in 2006. Harvard Business School, University of Groningen, Lonestar Academy, Texas are some of the academic institutions where Fasua has attended executive programs. He holds a Ph.D. in public policy and administration, from Walden University.

== Career ==
=== Banking ===
After completing his bachelor's degree (BSc. Economics 1991), Fasua started as a trainee officer in the Operations Unit at Citizens Bank Limited. He spent over four years there before moving to Standard Trust Bank Limited, where he served as a manager. He worked at Equatorial Trust Bank Limited, where at first, he acted as the senior manager before he was promoted to the rank of regional director in Abuja from 2001 to 2005.

=== Business ===
He started consulting firm Global Analytics Consulting Limited, serving as the group CEO starting in September 2006.

=== Author ===
Fasua is a prolific writer. He has authored 11 books: Crushed, Things to Do Before Your Career Disappears, The Race for Capital, Change Is Going To Come, What They Won't Teach You About Nigeria's Economy, 10 Reasons Why Youth Entrepreneurship Strategy Has Failed Nigeria, A World War By Another Means: COVID19, Revolution of Ideas, You Better Tell Your Side Of The Story and The Madness In The Heart Of Man. He writes as a policy and public affairs analyst, contributing articles on global and national economic matters. He is a columnist on various leading Nigerian newspapers, and appears as an analyst on various TV and radio programs.

He has written over 3000 articles apart from other interventions everywhere.

== Politics ==
On 16 December 2016, Tope Fasua led a group of Nigerians to form a political party, Abundant Nigeria Renewal Party (ANRP), and on 14 December 2017, the party was formally approved as a registered political party. ANRP under him grew its membership to about 53,000. He was a panelist at 2019 MACAA conference.

== Presidential campaign ==
At the ANRP National Executive Committee Meeting on 17 May 2018, Tope Fasua announced his intention to join the race, sought for the nomination to run for the presidency in the 2019 general elections and eventually did.

== Media Appearances ==
Tope has provided expert analysis on Nigerian and global economic issues for broadcast and print media outlets:

- Channels Television – interviews and policy discussions on inflation, investment, and economic reforms.
- Arise News – regular guest on topics including the economic performance, monetary policy, IMF reports and NBS figures.
- TVC News – commentary on state of the nation, central bank policy and fiscal reforms.

== Publications ==
Tope has written opinion pieces and analyses for Nigerian media outlets, particularly Premium Times, including:

- Corruption: A phenomenon that must never define Nigeria (2025)
- Revisiting Factors of production in a New Economic Age (2025)
- A memo to young Nigerians about AI and their future.
- Ebinpawa: What About The Cocoa Boom of 2024?

== Bibliography ==
- FASUA, TOPE (2011). Crushed!. New York: AuthorHouse. ISBN 978-1456770211.
- FASUA, TOPE (2013). Things to Do Before Your Career Disappears. New York: AuthorHouse. ISBN 978-1491878262.
- The Race for Capital. New York: AuthorHouse. 2015. ISBN 978-1504945653.
- FASUA, TOPE (2015). Change Is Going To Come. Sevhage Publishers. ISBN 978-9785379976.
- FASUA, TOPE. What They Won't Teach You About Nigeria's Economy. ISBN 978-9787819364.
- FASUA, TOPE. "10 Reasons Why Youth Entrepreneurship Strategy Has Failed Nigeria".
- FASUA, TOPE. The Madness In The Heart Of Man. ISBN 978-9787819357.

== See also ==
- Kingsley Moghalu
- Abundant Nigeria Renewal Party
