= Sa'a Ibrahim =

Nigerian journalist

Sa’a Ibrahim
- Born: April 18, 1960 (age 65); Magashi Quarters, Gwale LGA, Kano State, Nigeria
- Education: University of Sokoto (B.Sc. Political Science); University of Jos (Advanced Diploma in Radio Production); Bayero University, Kano (M.A. Public Relations)
- Occupations: Communication Expert, Journalist
- Employer: Abubakar Rimi Television
- Known for: First female Chair of Broadcasting Organisation of Nigeria (BON)

Sa’a Ibrahim is a Nigerian communication expert and journalist. She was the first female to become the Chair of the Broadcasting Organisation of Nigeria (BON). She is also the Director General of Abubakar Rimi Television.

== Early life ==
Hajia Sa’a Ibrahim was born to Malam Ibrahim and Yalwa Bello on 18 April 1960 in Magashi Quarters, Gwale Local Government Area in Kano State.

She attended Kofar Kudu Primary School from 1966 to 1973. After that, she proceeded to Government Secondary School in Dala, Kano State from 1973 to 1978 where she obtained her Senior Secondary School certificate.

She earned a bachelor's degree in political science from the University of Sokoto between 1980 and 1984, and she obtained an advanced Diploma in Radio production at the University of Jos, Nigeria between 1988 and 1989.

Hajia Sa’a Ibrahim holds a master's degree in public relations from Bayero University, Kano.

== Career ==
Sa’a Ibrahim started her journalism career as a producer at Radio Kano in 1984. She later became the head of the Radio Kano unit for women and children.

In 1986, she moved to Radio Deutsche-Welle where she worked as a producer for women's program and news presenter.

In 1993, she joined CTV67 as the Unit Head for Women and Children, eventually becoming their Program Manager.

In 1999, she became the manager of FM Kano and by 2005, she became their Deputy Director.

In 2014, Governor Rabiu Musa Kwankwanso appointed her as the MD/C.E.O for the Kano state-owned television station Abubakar Rimi Television.

In October 2019 she was appointed Chair of the BON.

== Service ==
Sa’a Ibrahim served at the State Advisory Panel for the DFID funded State Accountability and Voice Initiative – SAVI, where she supported and nurtured linkages between the media, CSOs and the State House of Assembly.

She also served as the Head of Media for Kano State Social Mobilization Committee from July 2002. At the committee, she provided assistance for the review, monitoring, and documentation of polio eradication and other public health communication activities in Kano State.

She served as a member of the Social Mobilization Technical Committee in charge of ten states under UNICEF in Bauchi from 1998 to 2002.

Sa’a Ibrahim is a member of BON, Theatre and Art Workers Union of Nigeria, (RATTAWU), Nigeria Association of Women, NAWOJ, and Nigerian Union of Journalists, NUJ.
