= African School of Governance =

University in Kigali, Rwanda

- Type: Independent Graduate Professional University
- Established: 16 October 2024
- Founders: Paul Kagame; Hailemariam Desalegn
- Chairman: Makhtar Diop
- President: Kingsley Moghalu
- Location: Kigali, Rwanda
- Website: asg.ac

The African School of Governance (ASG) is a graduate institution launched on 16 October 2024, with its campus located in Kigali, Rwanda. It was established to offer world-class graduate programmes in policy, research, governance, leadership, and management, aimed at developing future leaders on the African continent.

== Background ==
Efforts to address Africa’s challenges through policies developed within the continent have been ongoing, with the goal of shaping African leadership for sustainable progress. In September 2022, Rwanda’s President, Paul Kagame, and former Ethiopian Prime Minister, Hailemariam Desalegn, conceived the idea of establishing a graduate-level institution dedicated to governance and leadership training.

Their vision led to the creation of the ASG Foundation, an advisory group comprising academics, philanthropists, and leaders from across Africa, to make this vision a reality. After thorough consultations, the African School of Governance Foundation (ASGF) announced the establishment of the African School of Governance (ASG) on 16 October 2024.

On the same day, ASGF also appointed Professor Kingsley Moghalu, a former Deputy Governor of the Central Bank of Nigeria and former Nigerian presidential candidate, as President of the African School of Governance. In this role, he will serve as the institution’s Vice-Chancellor.

== Programmes ==
ASG offers three key programmes: an Executive Programmes, a Master’s in Public Administration, and an Executive Master’s in Public Administration. These programmes lead to degrees in Governance, Leadership, and Management.
