= Kemi Adetiba =

Nigerian filmmaker (born 1980)

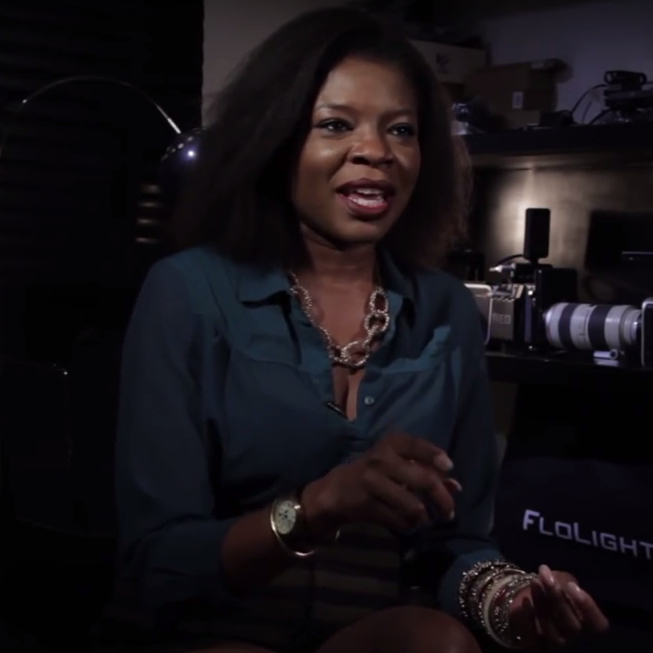
- Born: 8 January 1980 (age 46); Lagos, Lagos State, Nigeria
- Education: University of Lagos LLB Law
- Occupations: Filmmaker, music video director, television director
- Spouse: Oscar Heman-Ackah (m. 2022)

Kemi Adetiba (born 8 January 1980) is a Nigerian filmmaker, television director and music video director, whose works have appeared on Channel O, MTV Base, Sound City TV, BET and Netflix.

== Early life ==
Kemi Adetiba was born in Lagos, Nigeria, to Dele and Mayen Adetiba. She featured in a Television commercial for the detergent brand OMO as a child.

== Education ==
Adetiba holds a bachelor's degree in Law from the University of Lagos.

== Personal life ==
Adetiba became engaged to Oscar Heman-Ackah in January 2022, and they were married in April of the same year.

== Career ==
Adetiba started out professionally as a radio presenter with Rhythm 93.7 FM, where she became the voice behind two nationally syndicated hit shows Soul'd Out and Sunday at the Seaside. She started anonymously posting personal remixes online on various applications, such as Spotify and SoundCloud, under the username and tag 'hule'.

She began to make a transition from being a voice on radio, to being a face on television by producing and presenting several shows on Mnet, which includes Studio 53, Temptation Nigeria, which she presented alongside Ikponmwosa Osakioduwa. Adetiba was also a presenter on Soundcity TV and hosted Maltina Dance All for three consecutive seasons.

After years of success being in front of the camera, she enrolled at the New York Film Academy to learn the ropes about being behind the cameras, and today, her bodies of work as a director spread across the African continent and beyond its borders. Adetiba's short film Across a Bloodied Ocean was screened at the 2009 Pan African Film Festival and National Black Arts Festival.

On 8 September 2016, Adetiba's first feature film The Wedding Party (a Nigerian Rom-com film), premiered on opening night, at the Toronto International Film Festival (TIFF), as the opening film of the City-to-City Spotlight.

In 2017, she was presenting the show King Women, where she interviewed her mother Mayen Adetiba. Other former King Women included Chigul, Taiwo Ajai-Lycett, TY Bello and Tara Durotoye.

== Awards and nominations ==
Her works have won her several awards, including Best Female Video for the song "Ekundayo" by TY Bello at the Soundcity TV Music Video Awards and Best Female Video for the song "Today na Today" by Omawumi at the 2010 Nigeria Entertainment Awards. Adetiba's most recent works are the music video direction of Waje’s "Onye", which features Tiwa Savage, Olamide's "Anifowose", "Sitting on the Throne," and Bez's R&B single "Say".

Adetiba was nominated for Best Music Video Director of the Year at The Headies 2014. She won the City People Entertainment Award for Best Music Video Director Of The Year (2015) and a HNWOTY Award for Woman of the Year in Film and Television (2017).

== Filmography ==
- Across a Bloodied Ocean (2008)
- The Wedding Party (2016)
- King of Boys (2018)
- King of Boys: The Return of the King (2021)
- To Kill a Monkey (2025)

== Videography ==
- 2017: King Women
- 2015: "Last Bus-Stop" by Niyola
- 2015: "Dance Go (Eau de Vie)" for Hennessy Artistry '15 (feat. Wizkid and 2face Idibia)
- 2015: "Out the Magazine" by Lindsey Abudei
- 2014: "My Darlin" by Tiwa Savage
- 2014: "My Place" by Lynxxx
- 2014: "Love to Love You" by Niyola (featuring Banky W.)
- 2014: "Sitting on the Throne" by Olamide
- 2014: "Anifowose" by Olamide
- 2014: "Onye" by Waje
- 2013: "Toh Bad" by Niyola
- 2013: "Say" by Bez
- 2012: "If I Die" by Da Grin
- 2012: "Tease Me/Bad Guys" by Wizkid
- 2011: "I Believe" by Ego
- 2011: "Follow You Go" by Banky W.
- 2011: "The Future" by TY Bello
- 2010: "Fall in Love" by Ego
- 2010: "Lagos Party" by Banky W.
- 2010: "More You" by Banky W.
- 2011: "Today Na Today" by Omawumi
- 2008: "Ekundayo" by TY Bello

== See also ==
- List of Nigerian cinematographers
