= Mayen Adetiba =

Nigerian actress and civil engineer (born 1954)

- Born: 1954 (age 71–72)
- Education: Columbia University
- Occupations: Actress, Civil Engineer
- Known for: Nigerian woman engineer
- Spouse: Dele Adetiba
- Children: 3 including Kemi Adetiba

Mayen Adetiba (born 1954) is a Nigerian actress and a civil engineer.

== Early life and education ==
Adetiba was born in 1954 in Nigeria. She initially wanted to be an accountant, but she then got interested in journalism.

She went to the US for her university education where she had to work as her parents could not send her money because of export restrictions. She initially studied accountantcy at Virginia Union University, then spent a semester at the State University of New York before she transferred to Columbia University studying electrical engineering. She was told that civil engineering may be more appreciated in Africa so she decided to switch disciplines.

When she switched to study Civil Engineering at Columbia University she was not just the only Nigerian, but also the only black girl on the course. She went on to take her master's degree at Cornell University.

She married Dele Adetiba and their daughter Kemi was born in Lagos in January 1980.

== Acting career ==
She worked on The Bar Beach Show and was Lakunle Ojo's wife in the Village Headmaster. She was in Kongi's Harvest which went out in 1980.

In 2017 she was chosen to be on her daughter's show "King Women" where she was interviewed by Kemi Adetiba. She joined other former "King Women" including Chigul, Taiwo Ajai-Lycett, TY Bello and Tara Durotoye.

== Engineering career ==
Adetiba is a trained Civil Engineer. She was elected President of the Association of Consulting Engineers of Nigeria and was the vice-president of the Nigerian Society of Engineers on three occasions. She was the first woman to be elected to the executive committee of the Nigerian Society of Engineers. Her career included working on the African Union Southern Africa Regional Office which is in Malawi and on the huge Summerhill Baptist Church in Lagos. She worked on the latter pro bono.
