= Abundant Nigeria Renewal Party =

Political party in Nigeria

Abundant Nigeria Renewal Party (ANRP)
- Abbreviation: ANRP
- Chairman: Tope Fasua
- General Secretary: Ebere Perez Okonkwo
- Founded: 16 December 2016
- Legalized: 14 December 2017
- Headquarters: Km. 27, Umaru Musa Yaradua Way, Airport Road, Lugbe, Abuja
- Membership: 53,572
- Ideology: Constructive pragmatism
- Colours: Green
- Slogan: Abundant Nigeria

Website
- http://www.anrp.org.ng

Abundant Nigeria Renewal Party (ANRP) is a political party in Nigeria. It was founded on December 16, 2016 by Tope Fasua and some politically concerned Nigerians. The party was officially registered and announced by the Independent National Electoral Commission (INEC) as a full-fledged political party on December 14, 2017, which was exactly two days away from the one year anniversary of the party's formation.

== Crowdfunding ==
The party promotes and practices crowdfunding, taking inspiration from some political parties in developed nations around the world. The ANRP relies solely on willful donations, annual subscriptions from registered members, and other means to fund party activities.

== Ideology ==
The ANRP believes itself to be a thinking party and doesn't believe that extant ideology can be efficient enough to solve the myriad of problems militating against Nigeria. The party believes every society has the right to devise peculiar solutions to the peculiar problems they face. The First post-registration National Congress of the Abundant Nigeria Renewal Party, held in February 2018, stated in the party Constitution that "Constructive pragmatism" shall be the party's ideology.

== Abundant Nigeria Renewal Institute (ANRI) ==
Abundant Nigeria Renewal Institute is the learning establishment set up by ANRP to promote their good governance beliefs and renewal message.

== Party Structure ==
=== National Working Committee ===
The party maintains a lean structure with the aim to quickly deliver results. At the national level, the working committee consist of the National Chairman, Vice Chairman, National Secretary, Deputy National Secretary, Organizing Secretary, Deputy Organizing Secretary, National Financial Secretary, Deputy National Financial Secretary, National Treasurer, Deputy National Treasurer, Secretary for Gender Balance and Youth Development, Deputy secretary for Gender Balance and Youth Development, National Legal Adviser, Deputy National Legal Adviser, National Auditor, Deputy National Auditor, Secretary for Strategy, Deputy Secretary for Strategy Secretary, Internal Controls and Party Discipline, Deputy Secretary for Internal Controls and party Discipline, Secretary for Information and Social Media Engagements, Deputy Secretary for Information and Social Media Engagements, Secretary for Intelligence and Security, Deputy Secretary for Intelligence and Security, National Spokesman, Deputy National Spokesman and Deputy Secretary for Chapter coordination.

=== Working Committee at the State, Local Government and Ward levels ===
This structure at the national level is maintained at the state, local and ward level with the exception of three positions: Legal Adviser, Deputy Legal Adviser and Deputy Secretary for Chapter Coordination.

=== National Executives ===
The National Executives are made up of the members of the National Working Committee (NWC) and the 37 State Chairpersons.
