= Mike Omotosho =

Nigerian politician (died 2022)

Mike Oluwafemi Omotosho
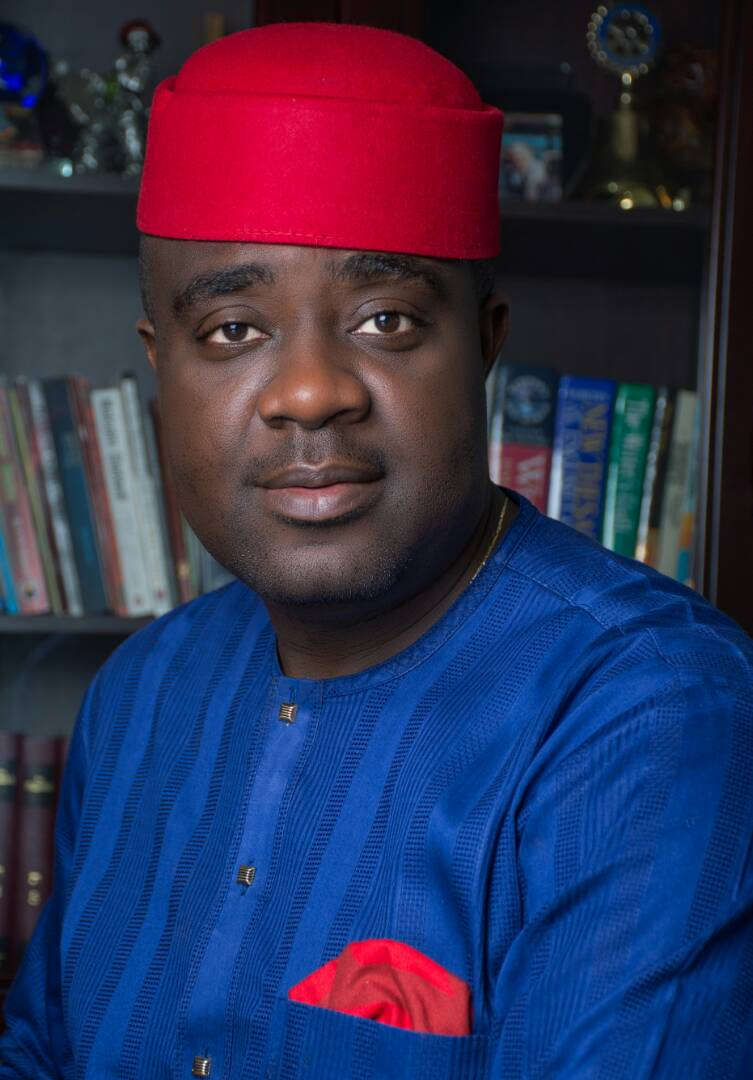

Background information
- Born: Mike Oluwafemi Omotosho
- Died: 4 June 2022 Newark, New Jersey
- Occupation: Politician
- Years active: 2015–2016

Mike Oluwafemi Omotosho (died 4 June 2022) was a Nigerian politician who served as chairman of the Labour Party.

He was governor of Rotary International in some parts of Nigeria, covering the whole of the North West, North East, North Central, and South West, excluding Lagos and Ogun states, from 2015 to 2016.

== Political career ==
Omotosho was chairman of the Labour Party of Nigeria from 2015 to 2016. He also contested the 2015 general elections in Kwara State where he came third in the polls. His mother was reportedly abducted in 2017.

== Philanthropy ==
Omotosho set up the Mike Omotosho Foundation to alleviate poverty and empower youths through training and community development programmes. The foundation has trained over 200 rural community members on vocational skills and provided 10 million naira micro credit scheme to empower 300 women to start small businesses. 500 youths from different local governments in Kwara State were also trained on employability skills, 150 indigent students from primary and secondary schools are also on scholarship scheme from the foundation. In August 2014, the foundation carried out medical mission in 12 communities in four local governments within Kwara State to provide free diagnosis, expert medical advice, and distribute free drugs, wheelchairs, and free mosquito nets. Over 5,000 community members benefited from the programme.

The foundation also put up a programme that reached 8,000 people in 2017.
