= Broadcasting Organisation of Nigeria =

Professional association in Nigeria

The Broadcasting Organisation of Nigeria is an association that is in charge of private and public broadcasters in Nigeria. It is in charge of monitoring the activities, coordination and management of televisions, radio and all media broadcasts in Nigeria. It is located in Abuja, North-Central of Nigeria.

== History ==
BON was founded in 1973 with over 140 members and they collectively own 250 radio and Television stations. Mr. John Ugbe, representing MultiChoice Nigeria Limited, is the 14th and current Chairman of BON, while Dr. Mansur Liman, the Director General of the Federal Radio Corporation of Nigeria, is the current vice-chairman.

He took over from Hajia Sa'a Ibrahim, the first woman to be appointed as Chairman of BON since August 11, 1988. She was elected during the 72nd Annual general meeting. She is the Director-General of the Kano-based ARTV.

== Vision ==
BON is aimed at becoming the voice of Broadcasting industry in Nigeria.

BON is aimed at creating an enabling environment for radio, television and new media broadcasters to serve their audiences and to make a positive contribution to the development of our society.

To improve the development of the broadcast industry in Nigeria while adopting cutting edge technologies to match their counterparts around the globe.

== October 2021–present ==
At the swearing-in ceremony in October 2021 at Abuja, the current Chairman of BON, Mr. John Ugbe, promised that his tenure would focus on training, aggressive membership drive, professionalism and related issues that will add value to the organization.

In line with his promise to improve professionalism among members through training, MultiChoice Nigeria hosted a 5-day intensive training on ‘Production for Television’ for BON members, facilitated by the MultiChoice Talent Factory in conjunction with Africa Magic. The training covered fundamental areas in TV production such as Multi-camera Directing, Studio Lighting, OB Van & External Broadcast, and a tour of the Studio for a well-rounded experience. The training had seasoned veterans in different areas of TV Production as facilitators: Mr. Jimi Odumosu and Mr. Bobby Heaney among others. The 5-day training is the first of a set that would also cover Radio Production and Transmission Engineering.

Aside from the training, the current leadership has promised to return the credible Broadcasting Organization of Nigeria’s award of excellence, leveraging on MultiChoice’s experience in organizing prestigious award ceremonies such as the Africa Magic Viewer's Choice Awards (AMVCA).

== Activities and achievements ==
BON organises free training on capacity building for its members and it purchased a property to serve as BON's Secretariat in 2018, after 46 years of operating in a rented apartment.

BON introduced the Broadcasters Hall of Fame to honour veteran broadcasters in the broadcasting industry.

BON ensured that NBC's plan to shut down media houses over non-payment of fees was cancelled and BON was actively involved in the consideration of the digital switch-over during the Senate’s public hearing.

== List of BON Chairmen from 1988–present ==
Name of chairman	Organization	Tenure
Mr. John Ugbe	MultiChoice Nigeria	Oct 2021–present
Hajia Sa’a Ibrahim	DG, ARTV, Kano	Oct 2019 – Oct 2021
Dr. John Momoh, OON	Channels TV	2016–2018
Alhaji Yakubu Ibn Mohammed	NTA	May 24 – December 31, 2016
Mr. Philip Ofoegbu	NTA	Feb 19 – May 23, 2016
Sola Omole	NTA	Dec. 2014 – Feb. 2016
Mallam Abubakar B. Jijiwa	VON	2004–2014
Aremo Taiwo Allimi	VON	2000–2004
Mallam Yaya Abubakar, mni	VON	1998–2000
Alhaji Abdurrahman Micika	FRCN	1996–1998
Alhaji Mohammed Ibrahim	NTA	1994–1996
Mallam Yaya Abubakar, mni	VON	1992–1994
Chief Bankole Balogun	FRCN	1990–1992
Engr. Shyngle Wigwe	NTA	1988–1990

== Executive Secretaries of BON From 1991 to Date ==
Name of Executive Secretary	Organization	Tenure
Yemisi Bamgbose, PhD		June 2021–present
Prince Olusegun Olaleye	OGTV	2012–2018
Mr. Osita Nweke	ABS, Awka	1996–2012
Mr. Obadiah Tohomdet	PRTV	1991–1996
Mr. Victor Folivi	NTA	1988–1990

Dr. Yemisi Bamgbose is the 5th and current Executive Secretary of BON. He started his broadcasting career at Ogun State Television where he rose to the position of Assistant general manager. He was later transferred to the Ministry of Information as the Director of Information before he was appointed as Permanent Secretary. He retired from the service in 2018 and was appointed as the Executive Secretary, BON in June 2021 and assumed duties on July 1, 2021.

Dr. Bamgbose also served as the President of the Radio, television, Theatre and Arts Workers' Union (RATTAWU) between 2008 and 2015.
