= Price intelligence =

Price Intelligence (or Competitive Price Monitoring) refers to the awareness of market-level pricing intricacies and the impact on business, typically using modern data mining techniques. It is differentiated from other pricing models by the extent and accuracy of the competitive pricing analysis. The technique can be applied by companies seeking to optimize their own pricing strategy relative to their competition, or by buyers seeking to optimize their purchasing strategies.

== Importance ==
Price Intelligence has become a table stakes requirement for retailers, for several key reasons:

1. Increased consumer price sensitivity.
2. Increased aggressiveness from competitors. Retail giants change prices upwards of 50,000 times per month. Amazon is the most aggressive with pricing, changing prices every 10 minutes or more often at times.
3. Increased price transparency and showrooming. Increasing smartphone adoption has played a large role in the prevalence of showrooming.

There are several technology companies that specialize in using modern data-mining techniques to discover, match, extract and report on competitive pricing data. According to RSR Research's 2013 annual pricing benchmark study that surveys retailers, 13% of retailers have fully deployed a price intelligence system. Another 54% of retailers surveyed were either piloting, evaluating or exploring putting one in place.

== Process ==
Competitive price monitoring typically involves the following steps:

- Discovery - Finding the product pages on various competitor websites.
- Matching - Determining through algorithms or human intelligence, whether or not the product matches exactly, or if it is a comparable product.
- Extraction - Process of gathering the price, shipping information, and availability data from the competitor website.
- Measurable data quality - Adding the extracted information to a database and checking regularly for accuracy.
- Reporting and Analytics - Ability to gain actionable insights from the data that has been gathered.

== Applications ==
Optimize corporate pricing strategy: Retailers are using price intelligence to gain a better understanding of their price position in the market, relative to their competitors, and make strategic pricing changes according to real-data. In concrete terms, this can mean that retailers use competitor monitoring, dynamic pricing, price monitoring, and real-time tracking on marketplaces.

Improve in-store experience: Several retailers have taken price intelligence into their stores and empowered their in-store associates to ease the process of price matching requests. In March 2014, Wal-Mart launched Savings Checker. It allows consumers to check prices and get back the difference as a Wal-Mart Rewards eGift Card if another local retailer has any of the advertised sale products at a cheaper price.

Boost pay-per-click conversion rates: Retailers are using price intelligence data in their paid search campaigns to throttle their ad spend based on price position relative to their competitors and in-stock availability. This application can result in up to a 64% increase in conversion rates according to a study.

Repricing: Incorporating price intelligence into a pricing strategy is becoming more important to retailers, as 30% of them intend to engage in competitive monitoring in the next 12 months. With the data retailers find through price intelligence, they can effectively reprice in line with competitors. Repricing can be either competitor-based or value-based. While the former often increases revenue, it is also likely to cause price erosion. In contrast, value-based pricing tries to avoid a race to the bottom, by focusing more on the bottom-line margin. There are several technology companies that specialize in repricing and pricing intelligence.
