= Gbenga Olawepo-Hashim =

Nigerian human rights activist

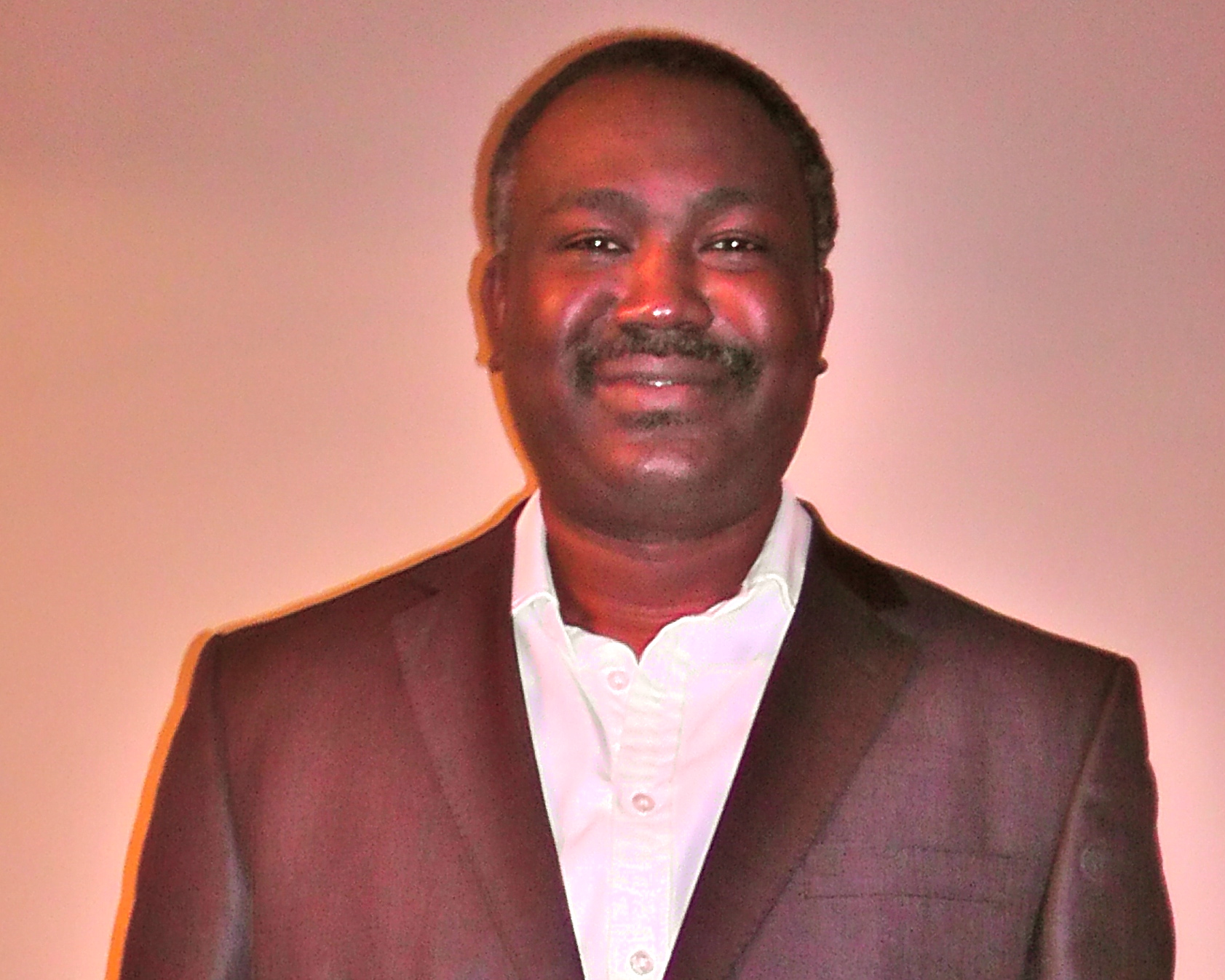
- Born: 1969 June 28; Yelwa, Kebbi state
- Education: Cherubim and Seraphim College, Ilorin. University of Lagos, Kwara College of Technology,
- Alma mater: University of Lagos. University of Buckingham
- Occupations: Politician, Human rights activist, Businessman
- Political party: Accord Party
- Awards: Kwame Nkrumah African Leadership Award, Veteran Award, 2000 Nigerian Union of Journalist Award, Max Bellof Scholarship

Gbenga Toyosi Olawepo (born 28 June 1969) is a Nigerian human rights activist and businessman. Olawepo first was recognized as an anti-apartheid activist; he and three other students' leaders of the University of Lagos were clamped into the over-crowded Nigeria Police cell in April 1989 after an anti-apartheid protest. The military regime that was growing increasingly repressive and intolerant of freedom of expression in Nigeria then ordered the detention of the student activist. The Education Editor of Guardian Express – Joe Idika- published an exclusive report on the plight of the quartet in what was an exposé on the deplorable condition under which detainees are held in the Nigerian Police facilities. The report was also a story of the visit of Margaret Thatcher over her government's pro-apartheid policy, which the student-labour protest was opposing.

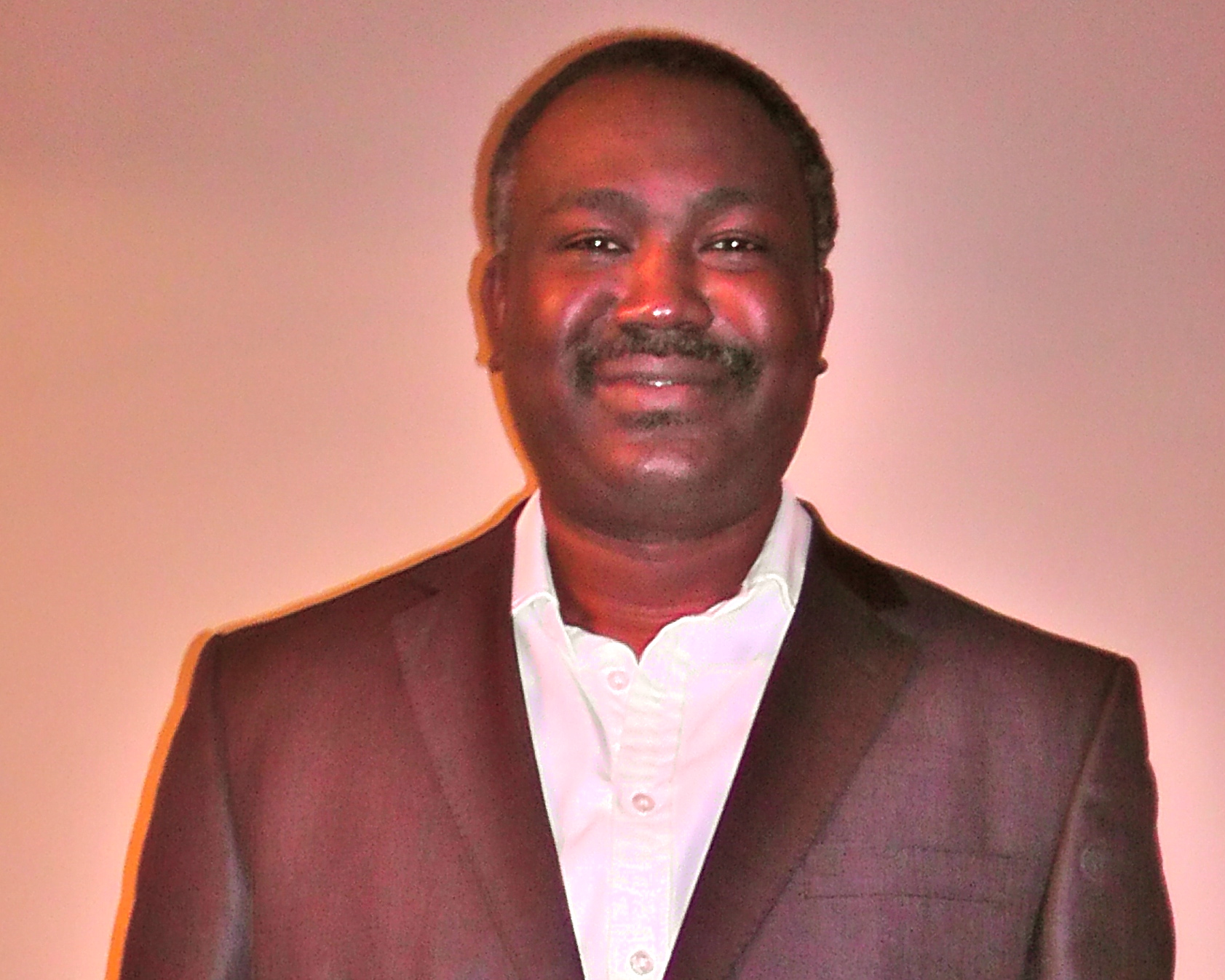
Gbenga Toyosi Olawepo

== Early years ==
Olawepo was born in Yelwa, Yauri, present Kebbi State located in Northern Nigeria, on 28 June 1965. Olawepo started exhibiting leadership qualities in the high school. In 1984, he was elected President of the Dramatic Society and later appointed Health Prefect at the Cherubim and Seraphim College, Ilorin. In 1986 at Kwara College of Technology, he was elected General-Secretary of the Youth Solidarity on Southern Africa in Nigeria (YUSSAN) and was active in the anti-apartheid movement. He organised film shows, signature collection to mobilise local and international support against the apartheid regime in South Africa and solidarity support for the courses of the people of Angola, Mozambique and Namibia. He was a member of the Local Organising Committee of the "Massive Freedom at 70 Nelson Mandela Concert" held at the University Lagos Nigeria. His involvement in the radical movement became deepened when he was elected Public Relations Officer of the National Association of Nigerian Students (NANS) in July 1988. This was at a time when the student organisation was defying its ban by the military government. As the spokesperson of the Nigerian student body he was at the frontline of confrontation with the military authorities. He spoke about "freedom of association being inalienable and which no military decree can take away," he spoke of the people's right to education and campaigned for return to democratic rule via the constitution of a democratically elected constituent assembly.

In May–June 1989, he was part of the leadership of the anti-SAP and pro-democracy uprising organised by the National Association of Nigerian Students [www.whirledbank.org/development/sap]. This revolt was nationwide and gained support across regional and ethnic boundaries; it also received international attention as it went simultaneously with the student protest at Tiananmen Square, Beijing and the pro-democracy revolt in Eastern Europe. The military regime dubbed it a "civilian coup" and reacted to it with an admixture of palliative concession and brutal force. To suppress the protest, the military government deployed riot tanks, police helicopters and riot mobile policemen shooting life ammunition against protesters.

== Detention ==
At the end of the uprising, over two hundred people were estimated to have been killed by the police, a huge number wounded and some student activists detained. Olawepo was clamped into detention for four months in solitary confinement under the Detention of Persons Decree No. 2 of 1984 as amended. It was detention without trial. He was released after an epic legal battle led by his counsel, the late President of the Nigeria Bar Association Alao Aka-Bashorun, and an international campaign co-ordinated by the International Union of Students, World Federation of Democratic Youth, Amnesty International and Human Rights Watch. The Amnesty International declared him a "Prisoner of conscience" in 1989. His case and that of Gbenga Komolafe adjudicated on by Justice Tajudeen Odunowo became the Loco classicos in Nigeria's legal history as it was the first time a court would order the release of a detainee under the draconian Detention of Persons Security Decree No.2. After his release from detention in December 1989 and graduation from the University of Lagos, he continued to be active in national and international affairs. In 1990, he was appointed National Administrative-Secretary of the Committee for Defence of Human Rights where he worked briefly and doubled in the same role for the National Consultative Forum-a group founded by human rights activists led by Aka-Bashorun and nationalist politicians like late RBK Okafor, Kola Balogun, late Mbadiwe, Mahmoud Waziri and Alhaji Tanko Yakassai. The group, National Consultative Forum (NCF), set for itself the objective of organising a national conference as a platform to democratise and restructure the Nigerian federation. The NCF attracted a section of former Nigerian "Super Permanent Secretaries" into its rank led by Alison Ayida and Tayo Akpata. Olawepo, who succeeded Femi Ojudu now managing director of "The News magazine," who had come on sabbatical from his African Concord job, worked effectively with the General-Secretary, late Dr. Beko Ransome-Kuti, in manning the secretariat.

== Transforming obstacle to opportunity-business life ==
After Olawepo graduated from the University of Lagos, he was confronted by an immediate problem: what to do with his future. The university authorities under the influence of the military authorities who were seeking to frustrate him had seized his certificate. The implication of this in a society that placed great premium on certificates rather than skills was that he could neither find a job as a graduate in the private sector nor in the public sector. This also meant he could not seek post-graduate studies.

The above challenge forced Olawepo into private business in 1991 after the stint at CDHR. He was interested in putting his skills as a trained mass-communicator to trade but he again had to dance round the provision of the Nigerian Institute of Public Relation decree and the Advertising Practitioners Council- both required his certificate to qualify for registration to practice advertising or public relation. The former student activist was now under intense pressure to beg the authorities by family members and relations who feel his future is now ruined especially when he is out of office and no one now seem to be speaking about his case.

However, Gbenga refused to beg his tormentors but took it in his strides. He saw an opportunity out of the obstacle after reading a thousand-page books on political communication in America and the United Kingdom. He arrived at a decision to establish a pioneer outfit in political communications, thus circumventing the limitation imposed by the Advertising and Public Relation Law. After a faltering start with the incorporation of Prompt Link Ltd., his political communication initiative properly took off with the incorporation of "Setandsell Ltd". He positioned his company against the traditional advertising agencies who he dismissed as mere product advertisers. He would say "you cannot package human beings like chocolate". He created a market for himself where he quietly became a czar in his field; he transformed obstacles into great opportunities and transcended major barriers making huge returns on his investment. He also has wide-ranging interests in the energy sector in Europe, America, and other African countries.

== Partisan politics ==
The former student union leader has distinguished himself in partisan politics. The Nigerian Tribune, a newspaper founded by the late Nigerian Nationalist leader, Chief Obafemi Awolowo, captured this properly. The newspaper sometimes ago wrote: "In the political firmament of Nigeria, there are young Saraki’s, young Azikiwe’s, young Adedoyin’s who are children of established political and financial magnates but there are few names that have made it on their own to the political centre stage like Gbenga Olawepo, a rising star with no fall back platform or push of any godfather or back up of any financial empire. Talking of emerging political leaders this is a true discovery’’.

1995 was his initial entrance into partisan politics when he became National Publicity secretary of the National Democratic Labour Party (NDLP) in the transition programme announced by the Abacha regime. Eventually his party and that of some politicians like Solomon Lar, Alhaji Rimi's SPP, Ciroma and Bamanga Tukur's ANC were denied registration. Rather than find accommodation in the military founded parties, Olawepo found association with principled politicians who opposed the late Nigerian military dictator Sani Abacha. This group of politicians first organised around the Institute for Civil Society and G-34 and later pioneered the formation of the People's Democratic Party (PDP).

Olawepo played a very active role in the formation of the PDP. He along with two others, Dahiru Awesu Kuta and Dubem Onyia, assisted Prof. Jerry Gana, Secretary of the formative process of the party. He also made generous material contributions to the party apart from intellectual contributions which earned him the respect of more senior citizens in the party. Of this, Prof. Gana said: "When the restoration process to democracy came in 1998/1999, he was one of the young people who stood with us so that we may allow the genuine process of democracy take place. He was one of those who came to us even when we were being harassed by the regime that time in G-34, one man who stood out any day, any time was Gbenga. I was the first secretary of the PDP transforming from G-34, the constitution and manifesto of the party were produced within 24 hours in my office and in Gbenga‘s press’’ . And talking of courage, it does appear it is innate in him. He has such an uncommon ability to make enormous sacrifice for whatever he believes in. For instance, after the Anti-SAP protest when he left Nigeria en route Ghana to represent "The All African Student Union" at the 13th Festival of youth and Students held in Korea, he was offered the opportunity to stay in Europe on exile since the military authorities were hunting for him in Nigeria. However, he offered to return home, saying, "we have job to do in Nigeria".

Olawepo again displayed courage when General Abacha suddenly died in 1998, on the eve of the consummation of his planned transmutation into a civilian dictator. The duo of Olawepo and Dan Nwanyawu, now National Chairman of Labour Party, coordinating with Jerry Gana, moved into Fort IBB- a military barrack in Abuja, which housed the then Chief of Army Staff, Gen. Ishaya Bamayi -a key member of the military high command, to deliver a memorandum suggesting some direction for the transition to democracy. The final programme of transition reflected substantially their input. But it was a risky venture done when the destiny of the nation was hanging in the balance and when there was massive troop movement. Olawepo played prominent role in the transition process. In 1998/1999, he was the Secretary of the Women and Youth Development Committee of the Transition committee established by the then President-elect, Chief Olusegun Obasanjo. He also assisted the then PDP Chief spokesperson – Senator Anietie Okon- in running the party's vast information machinery at the period of campaign and during the transition.

At the first PDP elected convention in August 1999, the businessman cum politician, Olawepo, was elected Deputy National Publicity Secretary. As a member of the National Executive Committee of the ruling party, he acquired the reputation of being a fearless and honest leader who spoke the truth to power. He advocated for adherence to party constitution and internal democracy in party administration, transparency and accountability in governance. In an administration that was initially distracted by executive- legislative squabbles, though he was close to the President, he publicly upbraided his dictatorial tendencies while supporting his anti-corruption crusade. He was also on top of efforts to make the leadership of the National Assembly accountable. He was committed to a set of ideals no matter whose horse was gored. "His tenure in that capacity is easily remembered for the principled stand he took at a time when individual selfish interests constituted the looming albatross of the PDP. He personally fought against a ploy hatched by top national officials of the party to extend the tenure of party officers in contravention of the party statutes. The irony of his position is that he would have been one of the beneficiaries had it succeeded. The furore and dust which that incident generated can be said to have contributed to his ouster from office and the eventual travails he suffered in PDP; such rare triumph of personal principle over a tempting political opportunism marked him out as a politician for the future".

Although he was returned to his office after a protracted court battle, a long bitter struggle over constitutionalism internal democracy and due process has been ignited in the party leading to the resignation of a number of founding fathers including Olawepo from the party as it grew increasingly anti-democratic with its officials acting increasingly with impunity. The crises in the PDP, however, brought to fore the best of Olawepo, which could not be ignored by his critics. Speaking about Olawepo, the present Foreign Minister of Nigeria and former National Secretary of the PDP, Chief Ojo Maduekwe, notes, "the lives of people like Olawepo should inspire us to speak well of ourselves. Gbenga is an inner driven person not afraid to stand alone, not afraid to be unpopular, not afraid to hold a view. A man who is inner driven listens to the music of his own universe, listens to the applause of the spirit inside that have etched out an horizon, which he must conquer and moving in that direction, he takes the lead and others follow who can see the horizon with him, of such is the stuff of history, of such is the stuff of greatness."

After quitting the PDP, which he helped to form, the politician businessman continued his partisan political career in the opposition. In April 2007, he ran as governorship candidate of the Democratic People's Party (DPP) in Kwara State and was declared first runner-up in an election many believed he won. International observers ruled the 2007 general elections as fraud. He contested the election result unsuccessfully to the appeal court. With the heat and tribunal processes over, Olawepo returned to school in the University of Buckingham to "cool off and catch up". It was almost twenty years after he left University of Lagos where his hope of pursuing an immediate post-graduate programme was punctuated by the university withholding his certificate for six years after graduation during the era of military dictatorship. In 2019, he contested to be President of Nigeria under a third party, People's Trust, against seating President, Muhammadu Buhari of All Progressive Congress and main opposition candidate, Atiku Abukakar.

== Awards ==
He has won many recognitions and honours which include: The Kwame Nkrumah African Leadership Award conferred by the continental student body -All African Student Union- at Accra, Ghana in 2003; The Veteran Award-in 2005 at Caracas, Venezuela by the International Union of Students and World Federation of Democratic Youths, (WFDY) . He also received the 2000 Nigerian Union of Journalist Award for Professional Excellence. In 2008 he was awarded the Max Bellof Scholarship for best performance in the first term's examinations on the MA in Global Affairs programme by the University of Buckingham, United Kingdom.. He has presented papers on ‘’African Two-Fold Misery- Aids and Wars, African Challenges of Democratization.’’ He has also written many academic papers. He has handled many challenging assignments nationally and internationally. He was Nigeria's delegate to the funeral of Hafez al-Assad, President of Syria in 2001. At home, he served as a member of the PDP Constitutional Review Committee in year 2000 and member of the Democratic People's Party Electoral Reform Committee set up after the 2007 election. He is well travelled and has visited over 27 countries. He has global business interest in the energy sector and is also given to charity works. He is a Christian and married with children. His early marriage was troubled leading to a divorce.

== Criticisms ==
He has been criticised by his former colleagues in the radical movement over his association with his ex-jailer military ruler, General Ibrahim Badamasi Babangida. Some political observers have also criticised him for being too idealistic when he needed to be pragmatic, costing him political grounds in the slippery Nigerian terrain.
