= Kingsley Moghalu =

Nigerian political economist (born 1963)

Kingsley Moghalu OON
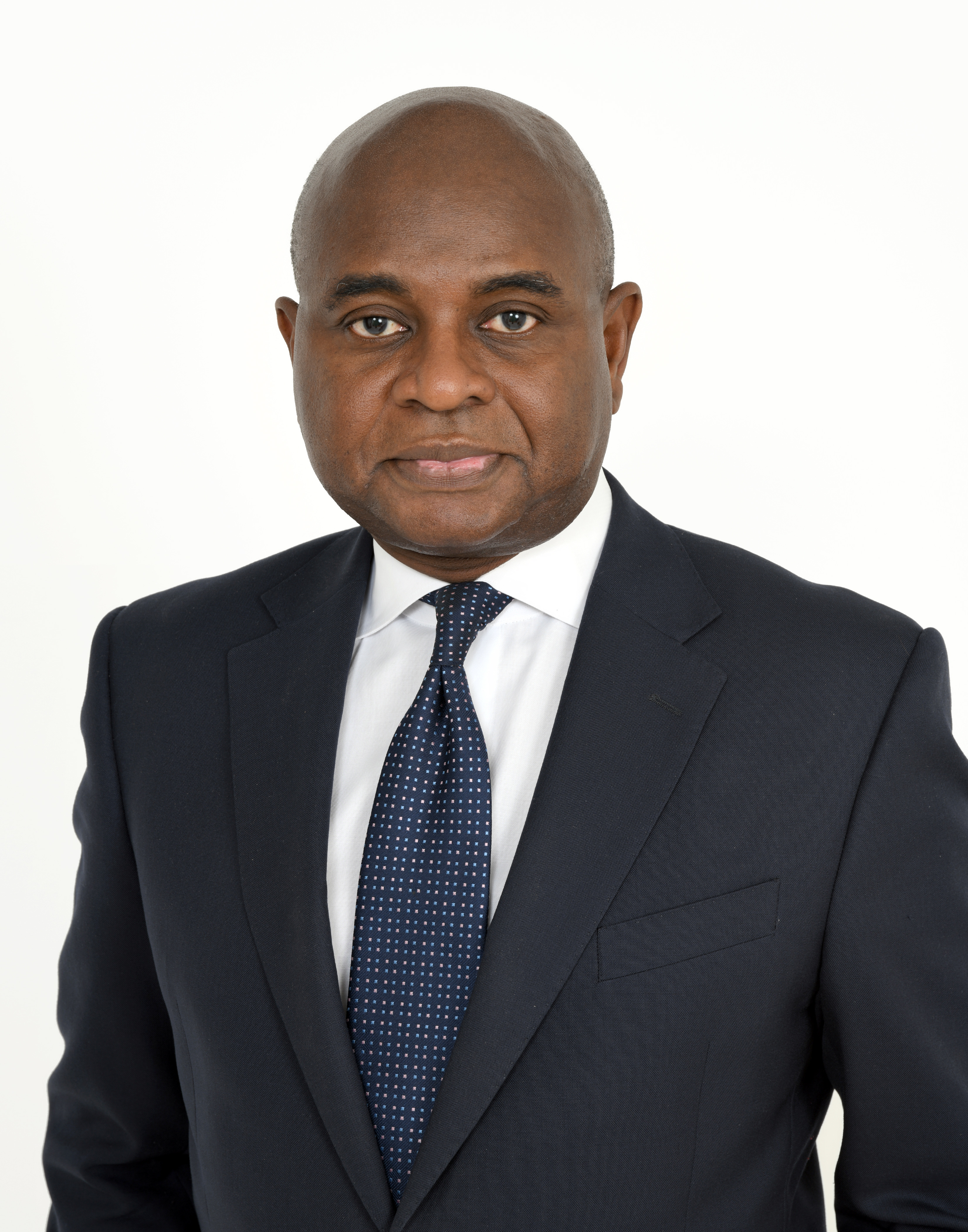

Personal details
- Born: 7 May 1963 (age 63) Lagos, Nigeria
- Spouse: Maryanne Moghalu
- Children: 4
- Education: Doctor of Philosophy degree in International Relations
- Alma mater: London School of Economics, Tufts University, University of Nigeria
- Occupation: Political economist
- Website: http://kingsleymoghalu.com

Kingsley Chiedu Moghalu OON (born 7 May 1963) is a Nigerian political economist. He served as Deputy Governor of the Central Bank of Nigeria, appointed by President Umaru Musa Yar'Adua, from 2009 to 2014. He subsequently taught at Tufts University as Professor of Practice in International Business and Public Policy at The Fletcher School of Law and Diplomacy from 2015 to 2017. He was the presidential candidate of the Young Progressive Party (YPP) in the country's general election in February 2019.

Moghalu is the founder of Sogato Strategies LLC, a global investment advisory firm, and the president of the Institute for Governance and Economic Transformation (IGET), a public policy think tank. He is a Non-Resident Senior Fellow at the Council on Emerging Market Enterprises at the Fletcher School at Tufts University and has served as the United Nations Development Program (UNDP) Special Envoy on Post-Covid Development Finance for Africa.

He was the Oxford Martin Visiting Fellow at the University of Oxford for the Michaelmas term in 2021.

Moghalu is the chairman of the board of directors of the Africa Private Sector Summit (APSS) and is a member of the Advisory Council of the Official Monetary and Financial Institutions Forum (OMFIF), a network of global asset management firms, sovereign wealth and pension funds.

== Early life and education ==
Moghalu was born in Lagos in 1963 to Isaac Moghalu, a Nigerian foreign service officer and Vidah Moghalu, a school teacher. Moghalu spent his early childhood in Switzerland and Washington, DC, where his father was posted. Isaac Moghalu transferred his service back to Nigeria's Eastern Region as the country was rocked by a political and humanitarian crisis, and the family returned to Nigeria in April 1967. The Eastern Region announced its secession from Nigeria the following month of May, and Moghalu and his family lived in his hometown of Nnewi, as well as Umuahia, the capital of the short-lived Republic of Biafra, during the civil war that lasted for two and a half years. In the 1970s Kingsley received his secondary school education at Eziama High School, Aba, Government College Umuahia, and Federal Government College Enugu. He earned a degree in law from the University of Nigeria in 1986, and the Barrister at Law from the Nigerian Law School, Lagos.

Moghalu obtained a Master of Arts degree in 1992, at The Fletcher School of Law and Diplomacy at Tufts University, where he was the Joan Gillespie Fellow and a Research Assistant in the International Political Economy Program. He earned the International Certificate in Risk Management from the Institute of Risk Management (IRM) in London. Moghalu later obtained his Doctor of Philosophy degree in International Relations at the London School of Economics and Political Science in 2005 with a thesis entitled "Justice as policy and strategy: A study of the tension between political and juridical responses to violations of international humanitarian law". He received advanced executive education in macroeconomics and financial sector management, corporate governance, and global strategic leadership at the International Monetary Fund Institute, Columbia Business School, Harvard University's Kennedy School of Government, Harvard Business School, and the Wharton School at the University of Pennsylvania.

== Career ==
Moghalu joined the United Nations in 1992. He served in political, legal, and external affairs assignments at duty stations in Cambodia, the United Nations headquarters in New York, Croatia, and Tanzania/ Rwanda. His first assignment was as a UN human rights and elections officer with the United Nations Transitional Authority. A year later, he was appointed political affairs officer in the department of peacekeeping operations at the UN Headquarters in New York. From 1996 to 1997, he served in the former Yugoslavia as political advisor to the special representative of the UN Secretary-General in Croatia. Kingsley was then assigned as legal adviser to the United Nations International Criminal Tribunal for Rwanda (UNICTR) in Arusha, Tanzania, in 1997 and later promoted to the role of the international tribunal's spokesman. As special counsel and spokesman, he was responsible for policy development, strategic planning and external relations. The UNICTR delivered the first-ever judgement by an international court on genocide.

In 2002, Moghalu was appointed to the World Health Organization in Geneva, Switzerland, as head of global partnerships and resource mobilization at The Global Fund to Fight AIDS, Tuberculosis and Malaria (GFATM), a public-private international development finance organization and social investment fund with $20 billion in assets and investments in 140 developing and middle-income countries. He was a member of the Global Fund's senior management group that set corporate strategy, a member of the risk management committee, and was promoted to the rank of director in 2006.

In 2006, United Nations Secretary-General Kofi Annan appointed Moghalu as a member of the UN General Assembly-mandated Redesign Panel on the United Nations Internal Justice System. Working at the UN Headquarters in New York for six months in the first half of 2006, the Redesign Panel reviewed and made recommendations on how to improve the system of administration of justice at the United Nations.

The Governing Board of The United Nations Conference on Trade and Development (UNCTAD) in Geneva, Switzerland appointed Kingsley Moghalu, in 2017, as a member of its high level Independent Expert Group on Financing for Development. The Expert Group reviewed and made recommendations on how to better achieve the Sustainable Development Goals and effective domestic resource mobilization for development in developing countries.

Moghalu resigned from the United Nations in December 2008. He then founded Sogato Strategies S.A., a global strategy and risk consultancy, in Geneva.

Umaru Yar'Adua, President of the Federal Republic of Nigeria (2007–2010), appointed Moghalu deputy governor of the Central Bank of Nigeria in November 2009. Moghalu was the deputy governor for Financial System Stability and supervised the execution of reforms in Nigeria's banking sector after the 2008 financial crisis. He also served as deputy governor for Operations, with supervisory responsibility for currency and branch operations, payment systems, and the management of Nigeria's foreign reserves of $37 billion. He led the rollout of payment systems reforms, including the development and introduction of the unique identifier Bank Verification Number (BVN), that enabled the growth of a thriving Fintech industry.

Moghalu was a member of the Monetary Policy Committee (MPC), the Committee of Governors (CoG), and the Board of Directors of the CBN, and also served as a member and representative of the CBN in the Economic Management Team of president Goodluck Jonathan. He served as the Chairman of the Boards of Directors of the Nigerian Export-Import Bank (NEXIM) and the Financial Institutions Training Centre, and as a member of the boards of the Asset Management Corporation of Nigeria, Securities and Exchange Commission (SEC), and the Kuala Lumpur-based Alliance for Financial Inclusion (AFI). He also represented the CBN as a member of the Board Executive Committee of the International Islamic Liquidity Management Corporation, headquartered in Kuala Lumpur.

In 2014, Kingsley Moghalu delivered the Thomas Hodgkin Memorial Lecture at the University of Oxford.

On 8 May 2023, Moghalu delivered the 30th Anniversary Founders' Day Lecture of the African Export-Import Bank Afreximbank at the Bank's Headquarters in Cairo, Egypt.

On 16 October 2024, the newly established African School of Governance (ASG) University, Kigali, Rwanda, appointed him as the inaugural President (Vice-Chancellor) of the institution.

== Controversies ==
Moghalu's tenure at the CBN included the introduction of non-interest (Islamic) banking. This policy generated strong political controversy. Moghalu defended the decision to introduce Islamic banking explaining that this was one of several measures to expand financial inclusion and not, as many Christians in a country with strong sectarian tensions erroneously believed, an Islamization agenda.

In early 2014, a disagreement of principle led to a temporary rupture in Moghalu's relationship with his former boss Sanusi Lamido Sanusi, who had been suspended by President Goodluck Jonathan. Sanusi had alleged a $20 billion fraud at the country's publicly owned oil corporation. Moghalu disagreed with the manner in which his erstwhile superior handled the sensitive controversy. He expressed frustration that Sanusi had overstepped his role as the head of the central bank and crossed into political activism, but emphasized his support for Sanusi's leadership in monetary policy.

The two men reconciled when, three years later, Sanusi, now the former Emir of Kano, received Moghalu with pomp and pageantry, along with the entire Emirate Council of Kano, when Moghalu visited him at his royal palace in Kano in November 2017. The Emir praised Moghalu's contributions to the successes of Sanusi's leadership team at the CBN, and stated that he had no regrets for having recommended Professor Moghalu to President Yar'Adua for appointment as a deputy governor of the central bank.

== Political career ==
In February 2018, Moghalu announced his intention to run for the office of the President of Nigeria. He later chose to run on the party platform of the Young Progressives Party. As the presidential campaign wound down in February 2019, Wole Soyinka, the Nigerian born Nobel Laureate, issued a strong endorsement of Kingsley Moghalu to be elected Nigeria's president.

Sanusi Lamido Sanusi, then Emir of Kano, also endorsed Moghalu for President. Moghalu also received the strong endorsement of the Ooni of Ife, Adeyeye Enitan Ogunwusi

Although Moghalu ultimately lost the election to Buhari, his candidacy, anchored on his manifesto "Build, Innovate and Grow" (BIG), had a strong appeal, and created a shift in Nigeria's political narrative towards the need for political and electoral reform. In October 2019, Moghalu resigned his membership of the YPP, announcing that he would focus in the immediate future on advocacy for electoral reform through the non-partisan citizens movement To Build a Nation (TBAN). In December 2022, Moghalu announced that he had withdrawn completely from partisan politics in Nigeria and had returned to a professional life. In September 2026, he rejected former Vice President Atiku Abubalar's presidential campaign policy team appointment, reiterating his non-partisan stance.

== Publications ==
- Moghalu, Kingsley Chiedu (February 2018). Build, Innovate and Grow: My Vision for Our Country, Bookcraft.
- Moghalu, Kingsley Chiedu (24 July 2014). Emerging Africa: How the Global Economy's 'Last Frontier' Can Prosper and Matter. Penguin UK. ISBN 9780141979465.
- Moghalu, Kingsley Chiedu (2006). Global Justice: The Politics of War Crimes Trials. Greenwood Publishing Group. ISBN 9780275992972.
- Moghalu, Kingsley (15 November 2005). Rwanda's Genocide: The Politics of Global Justice. Palgrave Macmillan. ISBN 9781403970817.

He wrote an essay, "Bretton Woods: The West and the Rest" in the book Bretton Woods: The Next 70 Years (2015). He served as a member of the editorial board of Central Banking Journal.

== Honours ==
Moghalu was decorated with the Nigerian National Honour of the Officer of the Order of the Nigerian (OON) by President Goodluck Jonathan. He was conferred with the degree of Doctor of Laws (LL.D.) Honoris Causa by Anambra State University, and is a Fellow of the Chartered Institute of Bankers of Nigeria (FCIB) and a Fellow of the Nigerian Academy of International Affairs. He is the recipient of the Rotary International Distinguished Service Award, and the "Against All Odds" Achievement Award of the African Women Economic Consortium. In 2019, following the general elections in Nigeria, the Federation of West African Freelance Journalists Association named Moghalu "Nigerian Political Icon of the Year" in what the association called "the Nigerian Political Achievers Hall of Fame".

On 28 December 2020, Moghalu was honoured with the conferment of the Nnewi traditional title of Ifekaego of Nnewi Kingdom by HRH Igwe Kenneth Onyeneke Orizu III.

== Personal life ==
Moghalu married Maryanne Onyinyechi Moghalu, Nee Ezike, in 1994. They have five children.
