= Fela Durotoye =

Nigerian social entrepreneur

- Born: Adetokunbo Olufela Durotoye; 12 May 1971 (age 55); Ibadan, Nigeria
- Education: Moremi High School; Obafemi Awolowo University; Harvard University
- Occupations: business consultant, leadership expert, motivational speaker.
- Notable work: He was appointed as the Senior Special Assistant to President Bola Tinubu, on national values & social justice administration
- Spouse: Tara Fela-Durotoye
- Children: 3
- Website: www.feladurotoye.net

Adetokunbo Olufela Durotoye (born in Ibadan, Oyo State on 12 May 1971) is a business consultant, leadership expert, politician, and motivational speaker. He was the Nigerian presidential candidate of the Alliance for New Nigeria party (ANN) for the 2019 presidential elections.

In 2023, Durotoye was appointed as the Senior Special Assistant to President Bola Tinubu, on national values & social justice administration.

== Education ==
Fela Durotoye was born on 12 May 1971 in Ibadan, Oyo State, Nigeria to Layiwola and Adeline Durotoye, both professors at the University of Ibadan. After his parents moved to Obafemi Awolowo University of Ife, Fela attended the OAU Staff Children's School between 1974 and 1981 and then to Moremi High School (1981–1986). Durotoye proceeded to earn his bachelor of science degree in computer science (with Economics), as well as a master's degree in Business Administration (M.B.A) at Obafemi Awolowo University, Ile-Ife. He is an alumnus of John F. Kennedy School of Government Executive Education program of Harvard University.

Fela Durotoye attended the High Impact Leadership for a better society program at the Yale University. He is also a certified leadership coach of the John Maxwell team. In 2015, Fela completed the executive seminar program on strategy, innovation and governance at the Lagos Business school. This was followed by the supernumerary police training program at the Nigerian Police training college where he passed out with a distinction.

== Career ==
Fela Durotoye was a financial analyst at Ventures & Trusts Limited in 1992. He was the head of the customer service department at Phillips Consulting Limited in 1998. Fela went on to start V.I.P Consulting Limited in the year 2000 which soon became notable in customer and human management in Nigeria. The firm was restructured and switched from a consulting firm to a social enterprise called Visible Impact Limited.

Durotoye facilitates and speaks at management and leadership retreats across within and outside Nigeria.

In 2018, Durotoye gave a speech to over 200 entrepreneurs at the inaugural Nigerian American Business Forum in Tampa Florida, where he shared the podium with senior senator Mohammed Shaaba Lafiagi, senator Ben Murray-Bruce, Nigerian Stock Exchange chairman Abimbola Ogunbanjo, Media pioneer Biodun Shobanjo, former governor Peter Obi and technologist Ade Olufeko.

== Mushin Makeover ==
In December 2009, Fela Durotoye championed then urban renewal project "Mushin Makeover". The project involved Banky W, Alibaba, Kate Henshaw, Omoni Oboli, Teju Babyface, Sound Sultan, TY Bello, Dj Jimmy Jatt, Omawumi, Denrele, Dele Momodu, Tosin Bucknor, Stella Damasus, Tee A, Segun Dangote, Ebuka Obi-Uchendu amongst others, painting and calling for donations of paints for the project. Young professionals donated free paint and were on hand to paint.

Fela mobilized over 2,000 volunteers to paint 296 houses across 7 streets of the Mushin suburb of Lagos at no charge to the owners and resident of the buildings. In the course of the Mushin Makeover project, over 100 unemployed youths were trained by Berger Paints PLC in ‘The Art & Technique of Painting’. The youths went on to earn a living as painters as a result of the Mushin Makeover project.

== Politics ==
On February 22, 2018, he made his intention to run for presidency in the 2019 Nigerian general election under the political party Alliance for New Nigeria. A coalition of 11 aspirants under the umbrella of the Presidential Aspirants Coming Together (PACT) unanimously elected Fela Durotoye as their consensus candidate. On Saturday, September 29, 2018, he emerged as the presidential candidate of the Alliance for New Nigeria (ANN) for the 2019 general elections.

While contesting for the highest office in Nigeria, Fela said "its not easy to run for office", but added that, "the best way to serve his nation's interest is to do so from the nation's highest office". After several months he chose Khadijah Abdullahi-Iya as his running mate. She has been a successful social entrepreneur and would be his vice-president.

On Thursday 24 January 2019, Fela Durotoye took to his Twitter handle commending Oby Ezekwesili for leading the frontier of building a formidable coalition and presenting a Consensus Candidate for the 2019 Presidential elections. He further expressed his willingness to support the candidacy of a Consensus candidate chosen from among the frontline alternative candidates, which include Fela Durotoye, Omoyele Sowore & Kingsley Moghalu through a transparent electoral process if he did not emerge as the Consensus candidate in the forthcoming election. Prior to this consensus was a Coalition between the Young progressive party and the Alliance for New Nigeria which was to be known as “The Force”.

On 9 October 2023, he was appointed as the senior special assistant to the president on national values and social justice. He revealed that he served without receiving a salary from the Bola Tinubu-led government from October 2023 till March 2024.

== Personal life ==
Fela is married to Tara Fela-Durotoye, a Nigerian make-up artist, lawyer and CEO of House of Tara. They have three sons, Mobolurin, Demilade & Morolaoluwa. Fela Durotoye is a Christian.
