= Tara Fela-Durotoye =

Nigerian beauty entrepreneur and lawyer

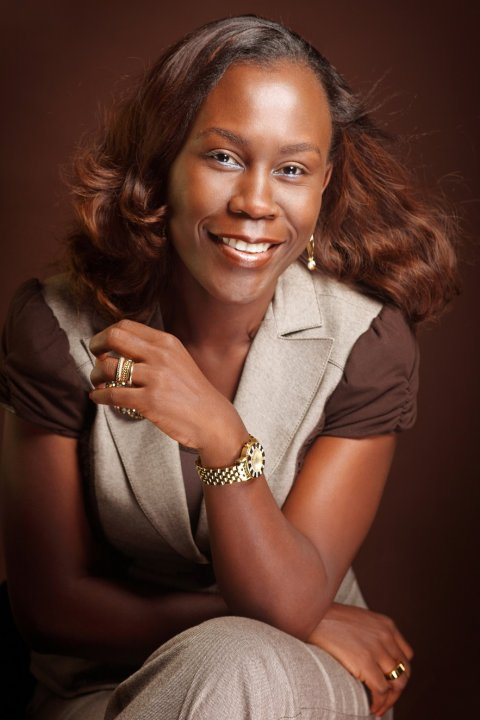
- Born: 6 March 1977 (age 49); Lagos, Lagos State, Nigeria
- Occupations: Beauty Entrepreneur; * Lawyer
- Spouse: Fela Durotoye

Tara Fela-Durotoye (born 6 March 1977) is a Nigerian beauty entrepreneur and lawyer. A pioneer in the bridal makeup profession in Nigeria, she launched the first bridal directory in 1999, set up international standard makeup studios and established the first makeup school in Nigeria.

She is the founder and CEO of House of Tara International and creator of the Tara Orekelewa Beauty range, Inspired Perfume and the H.I.P Beauty range.

As of 2019, her brand House of Tara, had 270 products, 23 stores, 14 beauty schools and 10,000 representatives all around Africa.

In 2007, Tara Fela-Durotoye was awarded the Africa SMME Award and the Entrepreneur award in South Africa and in 2013, Forbes listed her as one 20 Young Power Women In Africa. In 2020, the magazine Forbes listed her among "Africa's 50 Most Powerful Women".

She is an alumna of the Lagos Business School Chief Executive Programme, INSEAD Abu Dhabi, Yale University, The Stanford SEED Transformation Programme, and the Harvard Kennedy School having completed the Global Leadership and Public Policy in the 21st century, She is a member of the France/Nigeria Investment club which was incorporated in 2018 by the French President Emmanuel Macron.

== Early life ==
Tara Fela-Durotoye was born at St. Nicholas Hospital, Lagos to John Ejegi Sagay, a commissioner at the Federal Civil Service, Nigeria and Felicia Omaghomi. The couple separated when she was eight months old; and being a polygamous home, she was brought up by her stepmother, Modupe Agnes Sagay. She started her education at Command Children School, Victoria Island and proceeded to Nigeria Navy Secondary School, Ojo, where she was a boarder. In form 5, she was made the Sanitary and Welfare Prefect. She graduated from the Lagos State University, with a degree in Law and proceeded to establish the House of Tara International.

=== Personal life ===
Tara is married to Fela Durotoye, a business strategist and corporate activator, chief executive officer of Visible Impact. He made his intention to run for presidency on 22 February 2018, under the political party Alliance for new Nigeria. They have three sons, Mobolurin, Demilade & Morolaoluwa.

== See also ==
- Chinelo Anohu-Amazu
