= 2007 Nigerian general election =

General election held in Nigeria

- 21 April 2007
- Presidential election
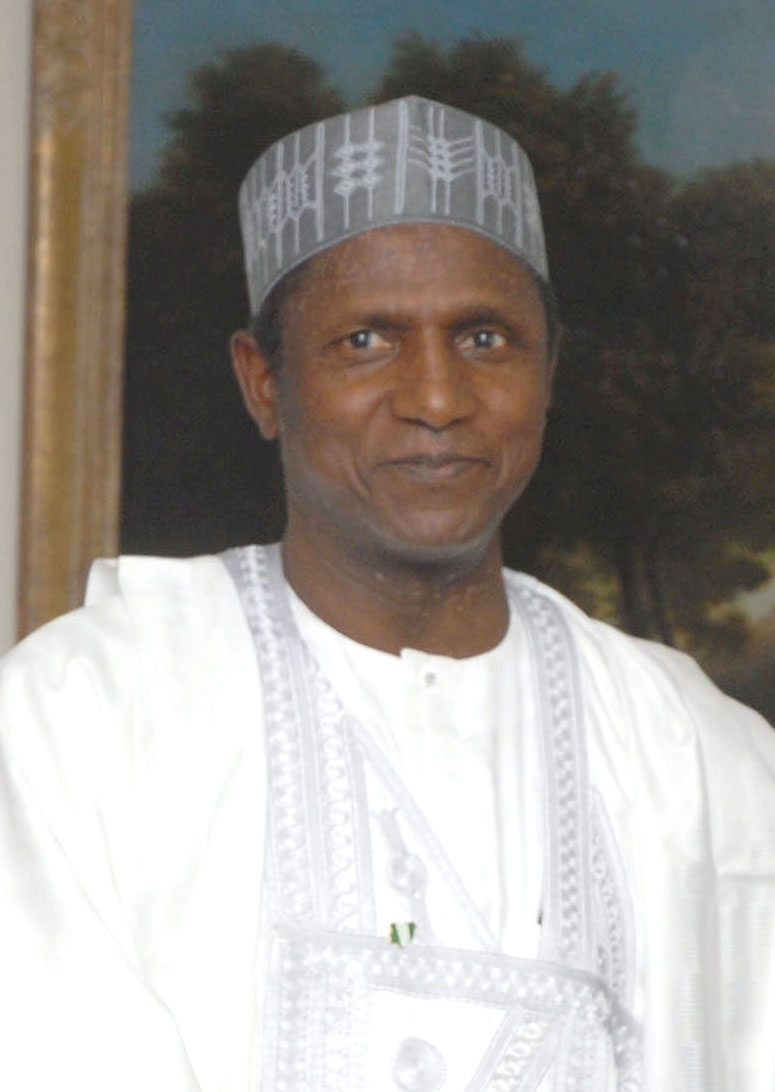

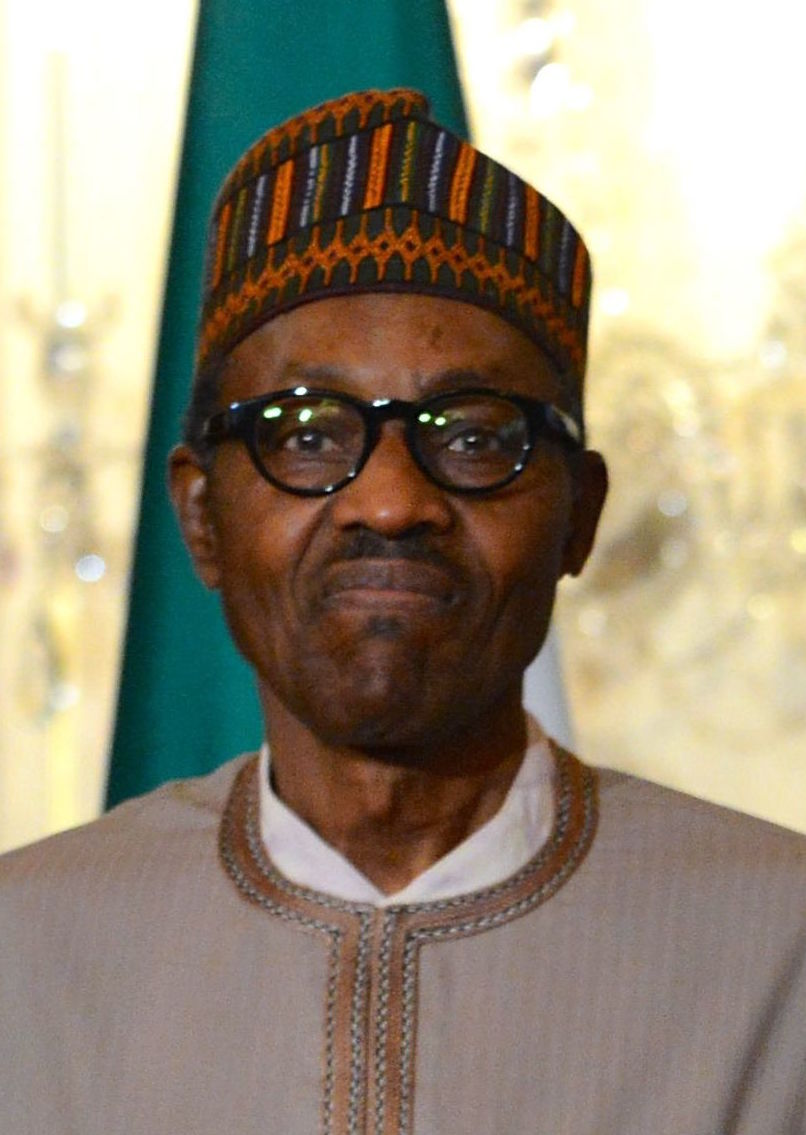

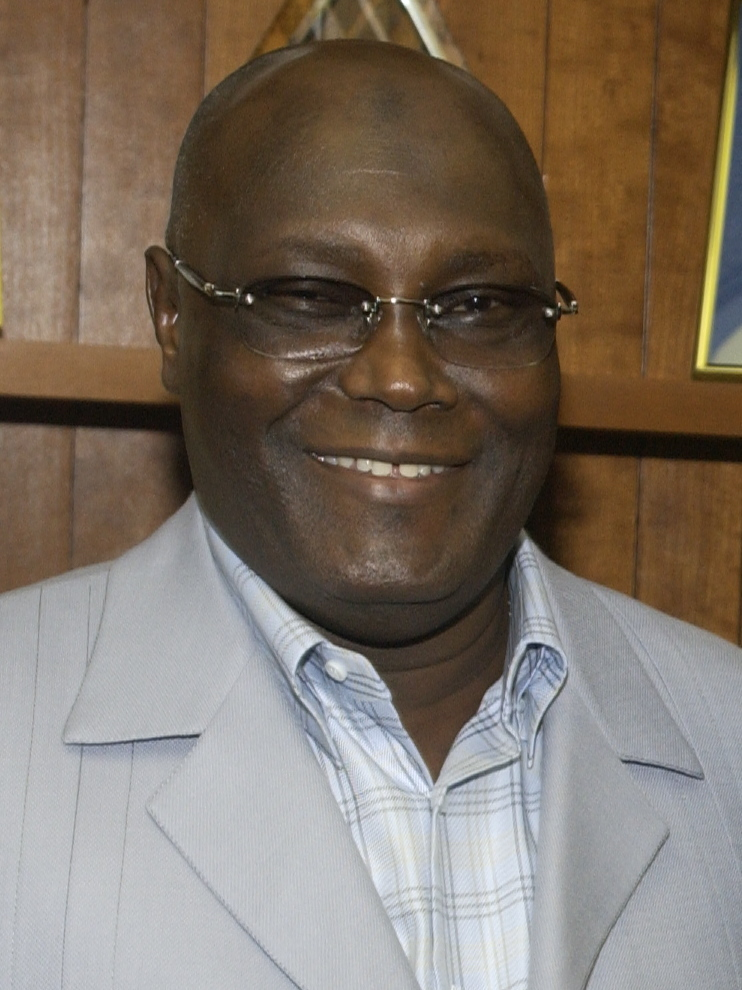
| Nominee | Umaru Yar'Adua | Muhammadu Buhari | Atiku Abubakar |
| Party | PDP | ANPP | ACN |
| Running mate | Goodluck Jonathan | Edwin Ume-Ezeoke |
| Popular vote | 24,638,063 | 6,605,299 | 2,637,848 |
| Percentage | 69.60% | 18.66% | 7.45% |
President before election
Olusegun Obasanjo
PDP
Elected President
Umaru Yar'Adua
PDP

General elections were held in Nigeria on 21 April 2007 to elect the President and National Assembly. Governorship and State Assembly elections had been held on 14 April.

Umaru Yar'Adua of the ruling People's Democratic Party (PDP) won the highly controversial presidential election, and was sworn in on 29 May. Election observers from the European Union described the elections as "the worst they had ever seen anywhere in the world", with "rampant vote rigging, violence, theft of ballot boxes and intimidation.".

== Background ==
On 16 May 2006 the Nigerian Senate voted to block a constitutional amendment which would have allowed its president to serve more than two terms in office. President Olusegun Obasanjo thus could not pursue a third term. Additionally he was unsupported by Atiku Abubakar, his vice-president. Presidential candidates were announced in late December 2006, and 50,000 assault rifles were ordered to help the military maintain order during the election. Umaru Yar'Adua was the candidate of the ruling People's Democratic Party (PDP), and the opposition All Nigeria Peoples Party (ANPP) featured Muhammadu Buhari. Atiku Abubakar, the incumbent Vice-President, announced on 25 November 2006 that he would contest the election, and he subsequently became the presidential candidate of the Action Congress in December.

== Candidates ==
The Independent National Electoral Commission (INEC) declared Abubakar ineligible to run due to fraud charges. A High Court had ruled that the commission could not disqualify candidates, but INEC claimed that the constitution barred candidates from running if indicted. Another superior court, the Court of Appeal, ruled in favour of the Electoral Commission by saying that it has powers to disqualify candidates. Abubakar attempted to get on the ballot via court challenge. In a case that came before the apex court, the court ruled that INEC has no constitutional powers to disqualify any candidates for the election, clearing the way for Abubakar to run. The Supreme Court, the country's highest judicial body, confirmed this ruling and reaffirmed Abubakar's candidacy.

Adebayo Adefarati, the candidate of the small Alliance for Democracy, died shortly before the election on 29 March 2007. This raised the possibility of the election being delayed, as the law provides for a delay under the circumstances if requested by the party that had nominated the candidate; however, a spokesman for INEC said that the election would not be delayed. He said that the party could nominate a replacement candidate.

== Conduct ==
The Nigerian military killed at least 25 suspected Islamic militants on 18 April, while battling extremists who attacked a police station on 17 April in Kano, days before the election. Shortly before voting began on 21 April, there was an alleged attempt in Bayelsa State to kill Goodluck Jonathan, who is the PDP vice-presidential candidate and the governor of the state, as well as a failed attempt to destroy INEC headquarters in Abuja with a truck bomb.

Following the gubernatorial and state assembly elections on 14 April, 18 political parties including those of Abubakar and Buhari, demanded on 17 April that the presidential election be postponed, that INEC be disbanded, and that the earlier elections be annulled; otherwise, they said that they would consider boycotting the presidential election. On 19 April, however, both Buhari's ANPP and Abubakar's Action Congress said that they would not boycott the election.

The 60 million presidential election ballot papers were kept in South Africa to prevent tampering. However, last-minute changes to add Abubakar to the list caused problems in distribution of ballots as papers did not arrive from South Africa until Friday evening. The reprinted papers were not serially numbered as was intended.

=== Observers ===
Following the presidential election, groups monitoring the election gave it a dismal assessment. Chief European Union observer Max van den Berg reported that the handling of the polls had "fallen far short" of basic international standards, and that "the process cannot be considered to be credible", citing "poor election organization, lack of transparency, significant evidence of fraud, voter disenfranchisement, violence and bias." They described the election as "the worst they had ever seen anywhere in the world", with "rampant vote rigging, violence, theft of ballot boxes and intimidation". One group of observers said that at one polling station in Yenagoa, in the oil-rich south, where 500 people were registered to vote, more than 2,000 votes were counted.

Felix Alaba Job, head of the Catholic Bishops Conference, cited massive fraud and disorganization, including result sheets being passed around to politicians who simply filled in numbers as they chose while bribed returning electoral officers looked away.

== Results ==
=== President ===
Number of votes per candidate

Official figures on voter turnout were not released but the turnout was estimated at 57.5 percent of 61.5 million registered voters.

The first results to be released, from Rivers State, showed a large majority for Yar'Adua. On April 23, Yar'Adua was declared the winner by INEC, which said that he had received 70% of the vote (24,638,063 votes). Buhari was in second place with 18% of the vote (6,605,299 votes), while Abubakar was placed third with about 7% (2,637,848 votes). Both Buhari and Abubakar rejected the results. The opposition candidates believe the election was rigged in Yar'Adua's favor.

Outgoing president Olusegun Obasanjo stated in a televised address that the election "could not be described as perfect".

Results, announced by Independent National Electoral Commission (INEC) Chairman Prof. Maurice Iwu, were: The results did not disclose the total votes scored in the states or the percentages of the scores by the presidential candidates.

| Candidate | Party | Votes | % |
|---|---|---|---|
| Umaru Yar'Adua | People's Democratic Party | 24,638,063 | 69.60 |
| Muhammadu Buhari | All Nigeria Peoples Party | 6,605,299 | 18.66 |
| Atiku Abubakar | Action Congress | 2,637,848 | 7.45 |
| Orji Uzor Kalu | Progressive Peoples Alliance | 608,803 | 1.72 |
| Attahiru Bafarawa | Democratic People's Party | 289,224 | 0.82 |
| Chukwuemeka Odimegwu Ojukwu | All Progressives Grand Alliance | 155,947 | 0.44 |
| Pere Ajuwa | Alliance for Democracy | 89,241 | 0.25 |
| Chris Okotie | Fresh Democratic Party | 74,049 | 0.21 |
| Patrick Utomi | African Democratic Congress | 50,849 | 0.14 |
| Asakarawon Olapere | Nigeria People's Congress | 33,771 | 0.10 |
| Ambrose Owuru | Hope Democratic Party | 28,519 | 0.08 |
| Arthur Nwankwo | People's Mandate Party | 24,164 | 0.07 |
| Emmanuel Okereke | African Liberation Party | 22,677 | 0.06 |
| Lawrence Adedoyin | African Political System | 22,409 | 0.06 |
| Habu Fari | National Democratic Party | 21,974 | 0.06 |
| Galtima Liman | New Nigeria Peoples Party | 21,665 | 0.06 |
| Maxi Okwu | Citizens Popular Party | 14,027 | 0.04 |
| Sunny Okogwu | Republican Party of Nigeria | 13,566 | 0.04 |
| Bartholomew Nnaji | Better Nigeria Party | 11,705 | 0.03 |
| Emmanuel Obayuwana | National Conscience Party | 8,229 | 0.02 |
| Olapade Agoro | National Action Council | 5,752 | 0.02 |
| Akpone Solomon | National Majority Democratic Party | 5,664 | 0.02 |
| Isa Odidi | New Democrats | 5,408 | 0.02 |
| Aminu Abubakar | National Unity Party | 4,355 | 0.01 |
| Mojisola Obasanjo | Nigerian Masses Movement | 4,309 | 0.01 |
| Total | | 35,397,517 | 100.00 |
| Registered voters/turnout | | 61,567,036 | – |
Source: African Elections Database

=== Senate ===
| Party | Seats |
|---|---|
| People's Democratic Party | 85 |
| All Nigeria Peoples Party | 16 |
| Action Congress | 6 |
| Progressive Peoples Alliance | 1 |
| Accord | 1 |
| Labour Party | 0 |
| Total | 109 |
Source: IPU

=== House of Representatives ===
| Party | Seats |
|---|---|
| People's Democratic Party | 262 |
| All Nigeria Peoples Party | 62 |
| Action Congress | 32 |
| Progressive Peoples Alliance | 3 |
| Labour Party | 1 |
| Accord | 0 |
| Total | 360 |
Source: IPU

==== Results by state ====
- Bayelsa State
- Federal Capital Territory
- Kwara State
- Nasarawa State
- Taraba State

=== State elections ===
After the death of Chief M.K.O Abiola, the ruling PDP won 26 of the 32 states, according to INEC, including Kaduna State and Katsina State, where the results were contested by the local population; the election will have to be rerun in Imo State and Enugu State due to complications. By the last count, Obasanjo's PDP party had won 29 of 33 states so far declared, with Human Rights Watch describing the vote-rigging as "shameless".

== Reactions ==
=== Domestic ===
Ikimi and Amusu, the representatives of the AC and the ANPP at the INEC Collation Centre in Abuja, denounced the results announced by the INEC Chairman. According to Ikimi, "In states like Edo, Enugu, Ebonyi, Imo, Akwa Ibom etc., we know that the elections did not start even as late as 5 pm. The results collated showed that over 80 percent of the votes being counted in favour of the PDP and they are totally flawed. In most of the states, only the Resident Electoral Commissioners and the PDP Agents signed the results. We have been here since yesterday (Sunday) to observe this collation and we only collated eleven states and the INEC Chairman just rushed down to declare the results and declare Umaru Yar’Adua as the winner."

According to Ikimi, "The result sheets we viewed so far was not signed by any of our agents at the state level. They were only signed by Resident Electoral Commissioners and only the PDP agents."

Also, Admiral Lanre Amusu who represented the ANPP at the INEC collation centre concurred what Chief Tom Ikimi said. "I am in total agreement with what Chief Ikimi has just said. Only results from 13 states and they were collated and signed by the Resident Electoral Commissioners in the States and the PDP Agents. Our agents did not sign these results."

The national chairman of the Democratic Peoples Alliance (DPA), Chief Olu Falae, with leaders of the African Democratic Congress (ADC), the Action Congress (AC), All Nigeria Peoples Party (ANPP), National Advance Party (NAP) and the National Democratic Party (NDP), has called for the setting up of an Interim National Government to conduct credible elections in the country. Falae explained that the country needed an ING to guard against the emergence of the military on the political scene.

The Atiku Abubakar Campaign Organisation claimed that the INEC deliberately left 70 percent of the ballot papers in a warehouse in Johannesburg, South Africa. They claimed that the contractors could have freighted the entire 200-ton consignment into the country three days before the election (Thursday) but the INEC told them to bring only 30 percent of the ballot papers.

Nigeria's Nobel laureate Wole Soyinka said the West should deny entry visas to election commissioner Maurice Iwu for his "complicity in the fraudulent elections." He said he has heard of the financial prudence and moral uprightness of Yar'Adua. "I wish he [Yar'Adua] would carry his decency even further by publicly renouncing this poisoned chalice to say: 'I'm not a receiver of stolen goods'."

=== International ===
A spokesman for the United States Department of State said it was "deeply troubled" by election polls, calling them "flawed", and said it hoped the political parties would resolve any differences over the election through peaceful, constitutional means.

"Nigeria has once again failed to rise to the occasion.... Size isn't enough.... It is a failed giant," said prominent Ghanaian economist Nii Moi Thompson. He compared its elections to those of Liberia in 2005, saying, "Even Liberia, which is coming out of war, had more credible elections than Nigeria."

"There is the saying: 'How goes Nigeria, so goes the rest of Africa', to have this widespread abuse of the democratic initiative certainly doesn't do Africa any good," said Scott Baker, a professor at Champlain College in the US city of Burlington, Vermont. "How can Nigeria sit at the meetings of the African Union African Peer Review Mechanism or ECOWAS and talk about other people's elections?" he asked.

== Aftermath ==
Yar'Adua was inaugurated on 29 May 2007.

In July 2008, the Labour Party governorship candidate in Ondo State, Dr Olusegun Mimiko was declared the lawful winner of the election by the Election Petition Tribunal thereby nullifying the election of PDP candidate, Dr Olusegun Agagu.

Buhari and Abubakar filed petitions to have the results of the presidential election invalidated due to alleged fraud, but on 26 February 2008 a court rejected the petitions. Buhari and Abubakar said that they would appeal to the Supreme Court.
