= 2011 Nigerian presidential election =

- 16 April 2011

73,528,040 registered voters 25% in each of 2/3 States + Majority votes needed to win
- Turnout: 53.68%
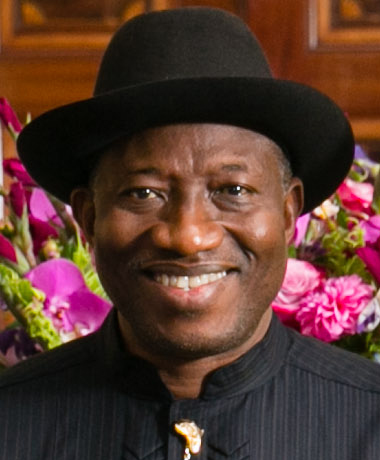

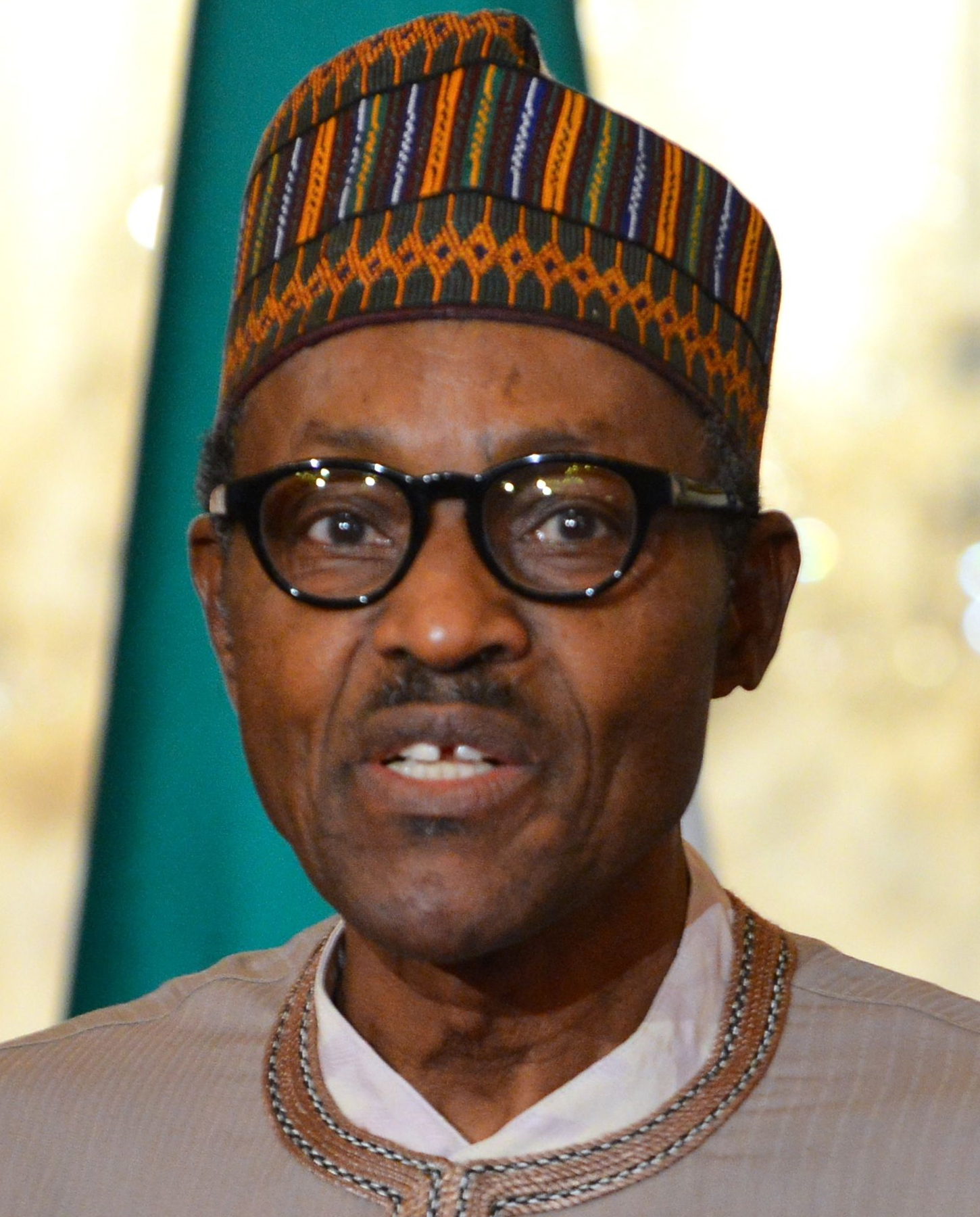

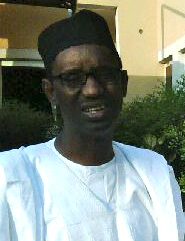
Nominee	Goodluck Jonathan	Muhammadu Buhari	Nuhu Ribadu
Party	PDP	CPC	ACN
Running mate	Namadi Sambo	Tunde Bakare	Fola Adeola
States carried	23 + FCT	12	1
Popular vote	22,495,187	12,214,853	2,079,151
Percentage	58.87%	31.97%	5.44%
- Results by state
President before election
Goodluck Jonathan (Acting)
PDP
Elected President
Goodluck Jonathan
PDP

Presidential elections were held in Nigeria on 16 April 2011, postponed from 9 April 2011. The election followed controversy as to whether a northerner or southerner should be allowed to become president given the tradition of rotating the top office between the north and the south after the death of Umaru Yar'Adua, a northerner, when Goodluck Jonathan, another southerner assumed the interim presidency.

Immediately after the election widespread violence erupted in the northern, Muslim parts of the country. Jonathan was declared the winner on 19 April. However, international observers declared the election to be "orderly, free and fair" in the entire southern half of the country.

== Background ==
According to a gentlemen's agreement within the ruling Peoples Democratic Party (PDP) power is to rotate between the predominantly Muslim north and Christian south every two terms; this meant the flag bearer of the party for the 2011 election was scheduled to be represented by a Northerner. After the death of one term President Umar Yar'Adua, a Northern Muslim, his Vice President Goodluck Jonathan, a Southern Christian, took over as acting president. The suggestion that Jonathan was considering running for the presidency in his own right was controversial as Yar'Adua had only served one of the two possible terms as president after Southerner Olusegun Obasanjo.

== Candidates ==
Due to the zoning system, a Northern Muslim candidate, Ibrahim Babangida, a former general and military ruler, and Atiku Abubakar, a former vice president, ran for the presidency. After initial doubts, the interim president Goodluck Jonathan declared his intention to run for the presidency on 18 September 2010. Muhammadu Buhari was seen as the principal opposition to Jonathan besides Nuhu Ribadu.

In 2011, sixty-three political parties were registered in Nigeria Online newspaper Naija Gist reported that twenty-one parties were fielding candidates, but listed only 19. Only one woman, Ebiti Ndok, was running.

Political parties	Presidential candidates	Running mates
ACN	Nuhu Ribadu	Fola Adeola
ADC	Peter Nwangwu	Mani Ibrahim Ahmad
ANPP	Ibrahim Shekarau	John Odigie Oyegun
AFP	Yahaya Ndu	
BNPP	Iheanyichukwu Nnaji	Kadijat Abubakar
CPC	Muhammadu Buhari	Tunde Bakare
FDP	Chris Okotie	
HDP	Ambrose Awuru	Ibrahim Abdullahi
LDP	Chris Nwaokobia	
NCP	Dele Momodu	Yunusa Tanko
NMDP	Akpona Solomon	-
NTP	John Dara	-
MPPP	Rasheed Shitta-Bey	-
PDC	Mahmud Waziri	Clement Eze
PDP	Goodluck Jonathan	Namadi Sambo
PMP	Nwadike Chikezie	-
SDMP	Patrick Utomi	Lawal Funtua
UNPD	Ebiti Ndok	Galadima Samari
	Ibrahim Babangida	

== Campaign ==
Following a bombing in Abuja during Nigeria's 50th anniversary of Independence celebrations and the arrest and interrogation of the Director General of Babangida campaign, Raymond Dokpesi, there were calls for him to quit the race. In addition, others who linked his affiliates to the blasts. He responded in saying it would be "idiotic to link" him with attack. Even before the blasts, however, some of his former loyalists, popularly called "IBB Boys," apparently asked him to quit the presidential race to avoid being rubbished by a non-General.

== Controversy ==
Postponement

In September 2010, the election commission requested a postponement of the polls citing the need for more time to overhaul the national electoral register. Critics were upset over the proposal. The election was postponed from January to April 2011 due to the release of a new electronic voter registration software.

Pre-election violence

In December 2010, bombs went off in Yenegoa, Bayelsa State during a gubernatorial campaign rally. Politicians and police said that the campaign of violence aimed to disrupt the election. There had been bombings and shootings in the north blamed on Boko Haram since 2009, intensifying during 2010. On 1 October 2010, the "Movement for the Emancipation of the Niger Delta", a militant group, claimed responsibility for dual car bombings during Nigeria's 50th independence anniversary celebrations in the capital that had killed at least 12. On Christmas Eve, 24 December 2010 a series of bombs went off in villages near Jos, the main city of the Plateau state, killing 32 people and leaving 74 others in critical condition, and on 31 December 2010 a bomb exploded in an open-air beer garden and market at army barracks in Abuja, killing at least four and wounding at least 21.

One of the controversy the 2011 election faced is the zoning controversy from one region to another when Goodluck Ebele Jonathan wanted to contest fully which lead to the southern and northern Nigeria then before the election.

== Results ==
The elections was reported in the international media as having run smoothly with relatively little violence or voter fraud in contrast to previous elections, in particular the widely disputed 2007 election. Indeed, at least one observer pronounced them the most smoothly run elections held since the restoration of democracy 12 years earlier.

The United States State Department said the election was "successful" and a "substantial improvement" over 2007, although it added that vote rigging and fraud also took place. The Guardian also noted that irregularities, such as underage voting and snatching of ballot boxes were reported. Buhari claimed that his supporters in the south were not allowed to vote.

Candidate	Party	Votes	%
Goodluck Jonathan	People's Democratic Party	22,495,187	58.87
Muhammadu Buhari	Congress for Progressive Change	12,214,853	31.97
Nuhu Ribadu	Action Congress of Nigeria	2,079,151	5.44
Ibrahim Shekarau	All Nigeria Peoples Party	917,012	2.40
Mahmud Waziri	People for Democratic Change	82,243	0.22
Nwadike Chikezie	Peoples Mandate Party	56,248	0.15
Lawson Igboanugo Aroh	Peoples Progressive Party	54,203	0.14
Peter Nwangwu	African Democratic Congress	51,682	0.14
Iheanyichukwu Nnaji	Better Nigeria Progressive Party	47,272	0.12
Chris Okotie	Fresh Democratic Party	34,331	0.09
Dele Momodu	National Conscience Party	26,376	0.07
Akpona Solomon	National Majority Democratic Party	25,938	0.07
Lawrence Makinde Adedoyin	African Political System	23,740	0.06
Ebiti Ndok	United National Party for Development	21,203	0.06
John Dara	National Transformation Party	19,744	0.05
Rasheed Shitta-Bey	Mega Progressive Peoples Party	16,492	0.04
Yahaya Ndu	African Renaissance Party	12,264	0.03
Ambrose Awuru	Hope Democratic Party	12,023	0.03
Patrick Utomi	Social Democratic Mega Party	11,544	0.03
Chris Nwaokobia	Liberal Democratic Party of Nigeria	8,472	0.02
Total		38,209,978	100.00
Valid votes		38,209,978	96.81
Invalid/blank votes		1,259,506	3.19
Total votes		39,469,484	100.00
Registered voters/turnout		73,528,040	53.68
Source: INEC

== Post-election violence ==
The election sparked riots in Northern Nigeria. According to Human Rights Watch about 140 were killed in political violence before the election alone, between November 2010 until 17 April 2011, the day after the election. According to the head of a leading Nigerian civil rights group living in Kaduna, more than 500 mostly Muslim people had been killed in three villages just in Kaduna since 16 April 2011. A speaker for the "Open Society Justice Initiative" stated the only comparable episodes of violence occurred in the mid-1960s and early 1980s, which both led to government overthrow. Buhari had refused to condemn possible violent reaction to the election result, which has been interpreted as an invitation to his supporters to riot. Up to 1,000 people could have died in post-election violence. There are report of post election violence which lead to killing of people in portharcourt after the declaration of the winner of the presidential election.
