= African Science Academy =

School in Accra, Ghana

Coordinates: 5°39′05″N 0°00′57″W

- Community 6, Tema

Information
- Founded: August 2016
- Founder: Tom Ilube
- Status: Active
- Head teacher: Gifty Ghansah
- Gender: Girls only
- Age range: 16-19
- Houses: Ruby, Obsidian, Citrine, Emerald
- Colours: White and violet
- Nickname: ASA
- Website: https://www.africanscienceacademy.org. https://www.africangifted.org.

African Science Academy (ASA) is an all-girls advanced-level school for mathematics and science established in August 2016 in Tema, Ghana, by a U.K., U.S. and Ghana-registered charity. The academy is made up of girls from different nationalities across Africa.

== History ==
In 2016, the African Gifted Foundation established the African Science Academy (ASA) - a STEM-focused academy for gifted African girls from low-income backgrounds. The academy was founded by Dr Tom Ilube CBE, a technology entrepreneur and educational philanthropist to spur interest in the field of STEM. In August 2016, the academy began with 24 students from Cameroon, Ethiopia, Nigeria, Sierra Leone, Uganda and Ghana. Since then, the academy has grown to attract girls from 12 African countries, including Togo, Rwanda, Eswatini, and South Africa. They have also doubled the size of their cohort from 25 to 50 students. ASA is the first all-girl institution for advanced level Mathematics and Science in Africa.

== Academics ==
The academy accepts gifted students between the ages of 16 and 19, who have successfully completed their secondary school education in Mathematics and Science. At ASA, their students undergo an intensive advanced-level programme, completing Cambridge International A-Levels in Math, Further Math and Physics in under 11 months. In addition to their studies, students are also provided with the opportunity to participate in extracurricular courses in Computer Programming and Robotics.

== Media mention ==
African Science Academy has been featured on CNN's Inside Africa documentary providing exposure to activities and programs run by the academy in supporting young women interested in STEM education.

== Sponsorship ==
In August, 2022 the African Science Academy announced their Lead Supporter, XTX Markets. The academy is also supported by a number of organisations including the Bank of America, The Black Heart Foundation, SThree and Tullow Oil to provide their girls with an outstanding education.

== Partnership ==
The ASA is one of the members of the Hali Access Network.
