= 2003 Nigerian presidential election =

- 19 April 2003
- Registered: 60,823,022
- Turnout: 69.08% (▲16.82 pp)
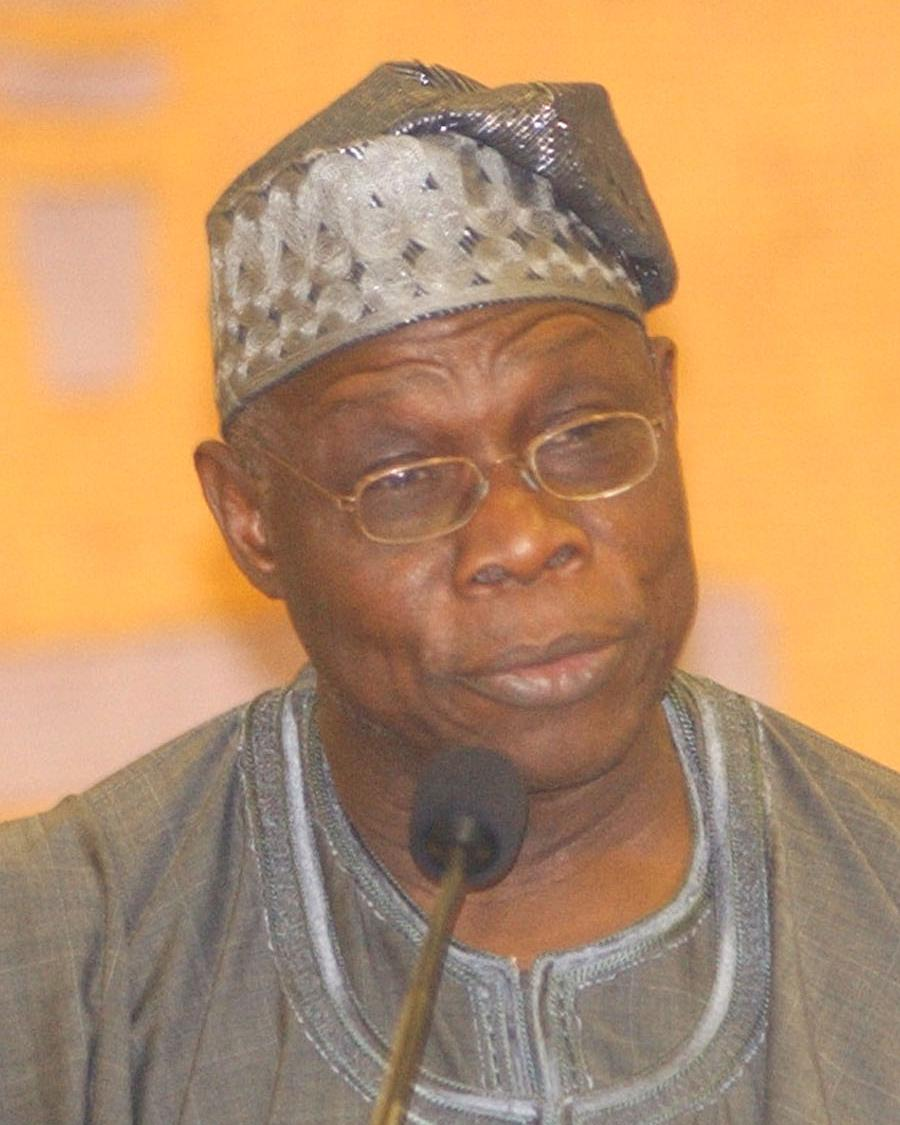

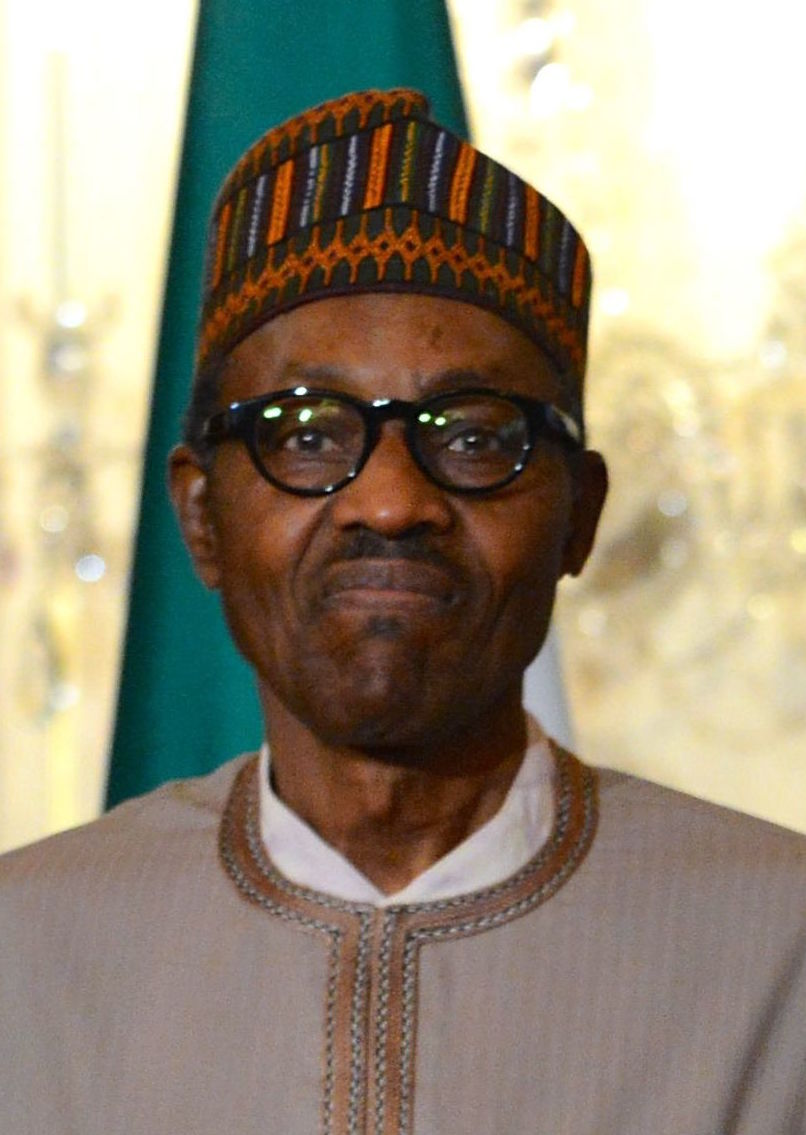
Nominee	Olusegun Obasanjo	Muhammadu Buhari
Party	PDP	ANPP
Home state	Ogun	Katsina
Running mate	Atiku Abubakar	Chuba Okadigbo
States carried	26 + FCT	10
Popular vote	24,456,140	12,710,022
Percentage	61.94%	32.19%
- Results by state
President before election
Olusegun Obasanjo
PDP
Elected President
Olusegun Obasanjo
PDP

Presidential elections were held in Nigeria on 19 April 2003. The incumbent, Olusegun Obasanjo, was re-elected as the president of Nigeria. Supported by the Peoples Democratic Party (PDP), he defeated Muhammadu Buhari—a former military head of state who was backed by the All Nigeria Peoples Party (ANPP)—along with 18 other opponents. Voter turnout in the election stood at over 69% which remains the highest ever since the end of military rule in 1999.

The elections were the first to be held under a civilian government in 20 years, and were seen as an important step on the path towards democratic consolidation. Most observers regarded their conduct as relatively peaceful and credible, with security that was better than expected. However, they were marred by allegations of fraud and vote rigging. Election observers turned in conflicting reports, with those from the European Union reporting that the elections were "marred by serious irregularities and fraud," while observers from the Commonwealth praised the election, reporting that "a genuine and largely successful effort was made to enable the people to vote freely." The chairman of the Independent National Electoral Commission, Abel Guobadia, rejected the vote rigging claims and defended the integrity of the election.

Following his re-election, Obasanjo gave a televised address where he thanked voters, praised the PDP as "Africa's greatest party", and urged his rivals to be "good sportsmen." Meanwhile, Buhari, who warned of "mass action" in case of electoral misconduct prior to the polls, threatened to withhold recognition of the new government. Eventually, Buhari and the ANPP went to court to challenge the results, claiming that Obasanjo's re-election was rigged and illegal. They sought to block him from assuming office, but this was rejected by the Nigerian Courts of Appeal led by Umaru Abdullahi. Ultimately, Obasanjo was sworn in for his second term on 29 May 2003.

== Background ==
Following the death of dictator Sani Abacha in 1998, general Abdulsalami Abubakar took over as president and ushered in a democratic transition in Nigeria. Presidential elections were soon held in May 1999, resulting in the election of Olusegun Obasanjo from the Peoples Democratic Party (PDP) and the establishment of the Fourth Nigerian Republic. Obasanjo had previously served as military head of state from 1976 to 1979, but later transferred power over to an elected leader. He had also been imprisoned in the mid-1990s for allegedly attempting to overthrow Abacha.

Obasanjo took office amid high expectations, with Nigerians hoping for improvements in human rights, political liberties, and accountable leadership which would address the country's issues. As Nigeria's first civilian president in 15 years, he sought to reduce poverty, combat corruption, reform the police and military, and establish a democratic government. During his presidency, Obasanjo managed to restore a moderate level of trust in government and reintegrated Nigeria into the international world. There were dramatic improvements in press and civic freedoms too, but public disillusionment grew due to scandals, legislative deadlock, and political infighting. The return of civilian rule also resulted in widespread corruption and patronage among political parties and the political class.

== Results ==
Candidate	Party	Votes	%
Olusegun Obasanjo	People's Democratic Party	24,456,140	61.94
Muhammadu Buhari	All Nigeria Peoples Party	12,710,022	32.19
Chukwuemeka Odumegwu Ojukwu	All Progressives Grand Alliance	1,297,445	3.29
Jim Nwobodo	United Nigeria People's Party	169,609	0.43
Gani Fawehinmi	National Conscience Party	161,333	0.41
Sarah Jubril	Progressive Action Congress	157,560	0.40
Ike Nwachukwu	National Democratic Party	132,997	0.34
Chris Okotie	Justice Party	119,547	0.30
Balarabe Musa	People's Redemption Party	100,765	0.26
Arthur Nwankwo	People's Mandate Party	57,720	0.15
Emmanuel Okereke	All People's Liberation Party	26,921	0.07
Kalu Idika Kalu	New Nigeria People's Party	23,830	0.06
Muhammadu Dikko Yusuf	Movement for Democracy and Justice	21,403	0.05
Yahaya Ndu	African Renaissance Party	11,565	0.03
Abayomi Ferreira	Democratic Alternative	6,932	0.02
Tunji Braithwaite	Nigeria Advance Party	6,727	0.02
Iheanyichukwu Godswill Nnaji	Better Nigeria Progressive Party	5,987	0.02
Olapade Agoro	National Action Council	5,756	0.01
Pere Ajuwa	Liberal Democratic Party of Nigeria	4,473	0.01
Mojisola Adekunle-Obasanjo	Masses Movement of Nigeria	3,757	0.01
Total		39,480,489	100.00
Valid votes		39,480,489	93.96
Invalid/blank votes		2,538,246	6.04
Total votes		42,018,735	100.00
Registered voters/turnout		60,823,022	69.08
Source: African Elections Database

=== By state ===
State	Obasanjo		Buhari		Ojukwu		Others		Valid		Invalid		Total	Turnout	
State	Votes	%	Votes	%	Votes	%	Votes	%	Votes	%	Votes	%	Total	Votes	%
Abia	386,748	51.70	84,305	11.27	260,899	34.88	16,082	2.15	748,034	97.25	21,133	2.75	769,167	1,285,428	59.84
Adamawa	660,780	69.13	285,151	29.83	2,352	0.25	7,564	0.79	955,847	96.16	38,186	3.84	994,033	1,280,204	77.65
Akwa Ibom	1,084,574	83.92	162,542	12.58	1,077	0.08	44,202	3.42	1,292,395	98.78	15,931	1.22	1,308,326	1,624,495	80.54
Anambra	466,866	54.15	79,476	9.22	279,378	32.40	36,473	4.23	862,193	96.09	35,052	3.91	897,245	1,859,795	48.24
Bauchi	617,291	36.73	1,043,442	62.09	1,678	0.10	18,131	1.08	1,680,542	96.61	58,964	3.39	1,739,506	2,130,557	81.65
Bayelsa	708,312	95.96	18,344	2.49	3	0.00	11,506	1.56	738,165	99.36	4,752	0.64	742,917	765,472	97.05
Benue	662,422	54.57	494,804	40.76	6,731	0.55	49,886	4.11	1,213,843	97.19	35,054	2.81	1,248,897	1,755,528	71.14
Borno	380,875	34.00	727,595	64.96	3,549	0.32	8,133	0.73	1,120,152	83.81	216,328	16.19	1,336,480	2,156,019	61.99
Cross River	1,207,675	97.92	11,624	0.94	2,112	0.17	11,910	0.97	1,233,321	99.61	4,854	0.39	1,238,175	1,289,192	96.04
Delta	1,072,527	93.87	27,492	2.41	15,062	1.32	27,541	2.41	1,142,622	97.50	29,245	2.50	1,171,867	1,607,337	72.91
Ebonyi	752,823	94.50	16,308	2.05	20,525	2.58	6,970	0.87	796,626	98.62	11,141	1.38	807,767	1,002,771	80.55
Edo	979,775	88.52	109,401	9.88	2,247	0.20	15,389	1.39	1,106,812	98.97	11,510	1.03	1,118,322	1,432,891	78.05
Ekiti	301,185	92.42	7,500	2.30	1,300	0.40	15,896	4.88	325,881	76.85	98,175	23.15	424,056	981,753	43.19
Enugu	897,721	79.66	18,987	1.68	177,050	15.71	33,187	2.94	1,126,945	98.43	17,942	1.57	1,144,887	1,479,542	77.38
FCT	130,243	49.87	99,220	37.99	22,481	8.61	9,219	3.53	261,163	95.10	13,457	4.90	274,620	628,100	43.72
Gombe	452,328	46.34	516,081	52.87	1,601	0.16	6,126	0.63	976,136	96.63	34,039	3.37	1,010,175	1,263,287	79.96
Imo	656,861	64.62	53,983	5.31	281,114	27.66	24,523	2.41	1,016,481	96.54	36,404	3.46	1,052,885	1,630,494	64.57
Jigawa	202,502	18.38	885,505	80.36	2,136	0.19	11,766	1.07	1,101,909	95.99	46,043	4.01	1,147,952	1,636,657	70.14
Kaduna	1,025,347	53.45	870,454	45.37	7,800	0.41	14,764	0.77	1,918,365	87.51	273,883	12.49	2,192,248	2,620,999	83.64
Kano	492,755	22.68	1,628,085	74.95	10,229	0.47	41,113	1.89	2,172,182	92.84	167,610	7.16	2,339,792	4,000,430	58.49
Katsina	380,914	23.04	1,259,789	76.20	2,928	0.18	9,530	0.58	1,653,161	96.61	58,051	3.39	1,711,212	2,567,245	66.66
Kebbi	272,564	33.43	529,512	64.95	3,888	0.48	9,255	1.14	815,219	92.66	64,607	7.34	879,826	1,343,549	65.49
Kogi	528,778	61.20	314,494	36.40	2,275	0.26	18,442	2.13	863,989	96.14	34,703	3.86	898,692	1,158,343	77.58
Kwara	390,800	68.04	170,325	29.65	2,293	0.40	10,951	1.91	574,369	91.94	50,326	8.06	624,695	995,882	62.73
Lagos	1,129,521	69.35	116,510	7.15	134,764	8.27	247,953	15.22	1,628,748	83.99	310,443	16.01	1,939,191	4,558,216	42.54
Nasarawa	470,936	64.58	244,005	33.46	1,488	0.20	12,837	1.76	729,266	98.38	12,023	1.62	741,289	852,626	86.94
Niger	486,621	49.49	390,103	39.68	11,849	1.21	94,633	9.62	983,206	93.39	69,583	6.61	1,052,789	1,607,730	65.48
Ogun	1,360,170	99.92	680	0.05	27	0.00	374	0.03	1,361,251	99.70	4,116	0.30	1,365,367	1,576,875	86.59
Ondo	840,988	94.61	31,994	3.60	4,180	0.47	11,701	1.32	888,863	89.33	106,221	10.67	995,084	1,504,181	66.15
Osun	582,089	95.18	14,369	2.35	1,424	0.23	13,711	2.24	611,593	78.02	172,321	21.98	783,914	1,367,627	57.32
Oyo	828,725	93.90	25,112	2.85	4,519	0.51	24,215	2.74	882,571	81.43	201,235	18.57	1,083,806	2,209,953	49.04
Plateau	706,432	67.26	324,566	30.90	6,362	0.61	13,010	1.24	1,050,370	93.71	70,561	6.29	1,120,931	1,391,594	80.55
Rivers	2,003,521	92.75	42,346	1.96	5,964	0.28	108,302	5.01	2,160,133	99.49	11,082	0.51	2,171,215	2,272,238	95.55
Sokoto	232,258	25.00	681,153	73.31	6,869	0.74	8,805	0.95	929,085	91.28	88,764	8.72	1,017,849	1,476,691	68.93
Taraba	694,527	76.65	198,023	21.86	1,179	0.13	12,340	1.36	906,069	98.10	17,534	1.90	923,603	1,026,950	89.94
Yobe	206,984	34.55	383,583	64.02	3,522	0.59	5,042	0.84	599,131	93.12	44,257	6.88	643,388	966,749	66.55
Zamfara	200,702	19.04	843,159	80.01	4,590	0.44	5,400	0.51	1,053,851	95.24	52,716	4.76	1,106,567	1,515,622	73.01
Total	24,456,140	61.94	12,710,022	32.19	1,297,445	3.29	1,016,882	2.58	39,480,489	93.96	2,538,246	6.04	42,018,735	60,823,022	69.08
Source: Electoral Geography 2.0

=== Maps ===
Vote share of Olusegun Obasanjo

Vote share of Muhammadu Buhari

Vote share of Emeka Ojukwu

== Aftermath ==
=== Electoral fraud ===
On the late evening of 23 April 2003, Obasanjo was declared as the winner of the election by the INEC. However, just as election officials were preparing to announce the results, the leaders of two parties — including the ANPP chairman, Donald Etiebet — stormed the podium and seized the microphones. They announced that they wouldn't endorse the official results, with Etiebet declaring that the results "did not reflect the wishes of the people."

International observers, including the European Union, determined various irregularities in 11 of the 36 Federal States. Thus, in many cases votes were pre-filled or results were later amended. In some states those did not fulfil minimum standard for democratic elections.

Nearly all opposition parties refused to recognise the result. The electoral committee noted for example that in the city Warri in the Niger delta of 135,739 voters, 133,529 voted for the parliamentary election. Observers reported, however, that up to the Saturday afternoon no elections and only some polling stations had opened. Also, the counting time was very long compared with other countries pointed according to observers on possible electoral fraud.
