= Sarah Jibril =

Nigerian politician and psychologist

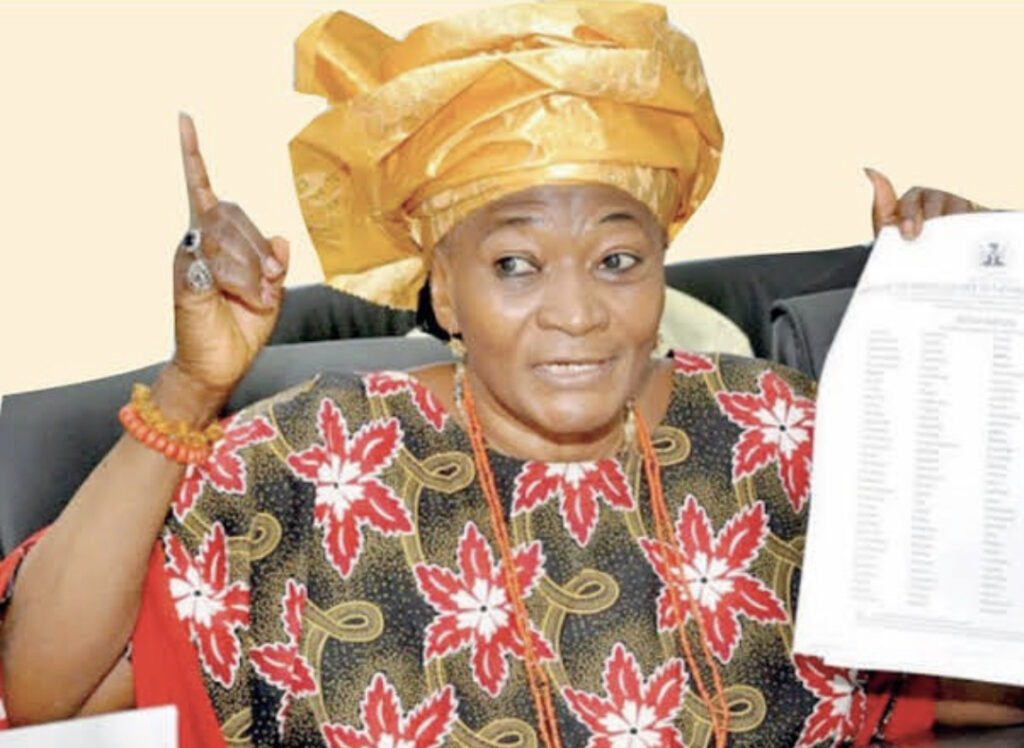
- Born: Sarah Nnadzwa; March 1945 (age 81); Kwara State, Nigeria
- Education: Queen Elizabeth Secondary School
- Alma mater: Senior Staff College; Dartford College of Education; University of Lagos; The Living Word Seminary
- Occupation: Counselor
- Political party: Social Democratic Party (1992); People's Democratic Party (1998–2015)
- Spouse: General Jibril
- Children: 4

Sarah Nnadzwa Jibril (born 1945) is a Nigerian politician, psychologist, social reform proponent, and philanthropist. She is known for serving as the special adviser to President Goodluck Jonathan on ethics and moral values and for her advocacy of the emancipation and empowerment of Nigerian women and children. Jibril is Nigeria's first female presidential candidate both at the primaries and main elections, having run for president on four occasions.

== Early life and education ==
Sarah Nnadzwa was born in Kwara State in March 1945, before Nigeria was an independent nation. She is of the Nupe tribe in Pategi local government area of Kwara State. She had her secondary education at Queen Elizabeth School, Ilorin, where she played basketball and was a house sport captain who competed in high jump and sprinting events. As a child, she wanted to be a medical practitioner, but this ended after she received a scholarship toward a diploma in education in the UK. However, after her return to Nigeria, Jibril took up an appointment with Advanced Teacher's College, Kano, to teach physical and health education. She earned her first degree in recreational leadership from Senior Staff College in Fort Leavenworth, Kansas City. Jibril also has a master's degree in educational psychology with guidance and a minor in counseling from the University of Lagos. Before her interest in politics, she was working on a thesis on social psychology at Ahmadu Bello University, Zaria. In appreciation for her religious involvement, Jibril received a scholarship from The Living Word Seminary in the United States to start a PhD in Christian Motivation.

Jibril is an advocate for ethics education, which she believes is the missing link in effective personal development. In 2006, her book, Ethics for Development, was published to support her cause. Her prior publication, Hints for Effective Parenting: For Effective Family Living, was published to support the Makurdi chapter of the Nigerian Army Officers' Wives Association, Etutu Brigade.

== Political career ==
Jibril's quest for public office began in 1983 when she contested to be a senator in Kwara State. According to her, the desire to reorient the mindset of Nigerians on politics was what prompted her to go into it. She has stated that her name, "Sarah", encompasses her vision for Nigeria.

Jibril was also appointed commissioner for social development, youth, and sport in Kwara State, and has served on various sporting positions, including Kaduna State's sports council. In 1992, she contested to be president under the Social Democratic Party but placed fourth in the primary election, although she won the presidential nomination for her state, Kwara. She re-contested to be president in 1998, on the platform of the People's Democratic Party (PDP)but lost to Olusegun Obasanjo. In 2003, she defected from PDP to Progressive Action Congress to become the first woman to represent a registered party and be a presidential candidate but lost to Obasanjo again. As of that same year, Jibril served as the deputy chairman of the Progressive Liberation Party. In the 2007 PDP primaries, Jibril received a total of four votes.

During the 2011 presidential election primaries, Jibril was the only female candidate to represent the PDP. She ran a significantly underfunded campaign, compared with those of her male counterparts, and after losing to President Goodluck Jonathan with only a single vote, she was appointed as special adviser to the president on ethics and values. Jibril then urged President Goodluck Jonathan to include more women in his cabinet.

As a special adviser, she advocated for a national curriculum that would ensure Nigeria's freedom from corruption at all levels and the maintenance of the country's founding values. Jibril accused opponents of President Goodluck Jonathan E. of being mannerless and lacking decorum. She blamed state governors in Nigeria for not effectively using the resources given to them by the federal government and supported the reelection bid of former president Goodluck Jonathan.

In 2015, Jibril was criticized for attributing the frequent cases of sexual offenses towards women to the indecent dressing of Nigerian female youths.

In an interview with Vanguard, she supported the anti-corruption fight of the former president Muhammadu Buhari and stated that the previous administration had not done enough to maintain integrity and accountability.

As of 2021, Jibril is a leader of the Justice Must Prevail Party.

== Personal life ==
Jibril is the widow of Brigadier General Jibril, and they have four children and grandchildren. Being married to a top military man, she served as the secretary of the Lagos State chapter of the Nigeria Army Officers Wives Association. She is fluent in Nupe, Hausa, Yoruba, and English.
