= Adaeze Atuegwu =

Nigerian American novelist (born 1977)

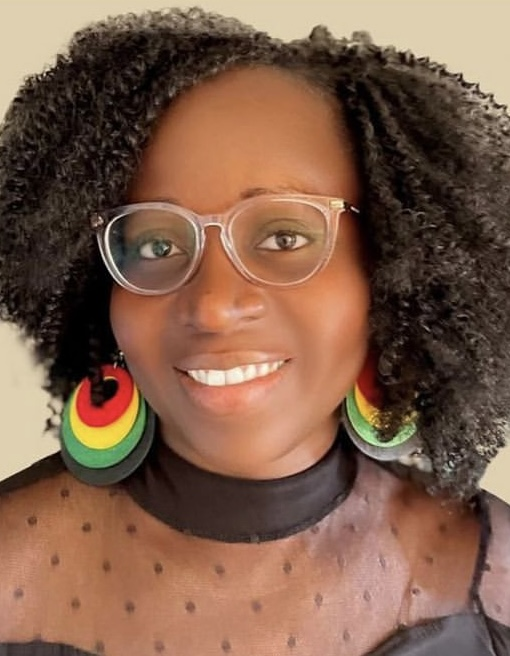
- Born: June 5, 1977 (age 49); Enugu, Nigeria
- Citizenship: American
- Education: Rutgers University Johns Hopkins University University of Florida
- Occupations: Author, pharmacist
- Years active: 1994–present
- Website: adaezea.com

Adaeze Ifeoma Atuegwu // (born June 5, 1977) is a Nigerian-American novelist and writer whose works include novels, children's stories, medical non-fiction, and drama. She is considered one of Nigeria's youngest most prolific authors with 17 books published by the age of seventeen.

== Early life and family ==
Atuegwu was born in the city of Enugu in Nigeria to pharmacist and philanthropist Prince Chris Atuegwu of the Nnofo royal lineage in Nnewi and Lady Ifeoma Atuegwu, pharmacist, philanthropist, and founder of Bina Foundation, and a 2017 winner of the Margarette Golding Award of the International Inner Wheel, also from Nnewi, Anambra State, Nigeria.

Atuegwu grew up in Enugu.

Atuegwu wrote her first novel, Fate at 17 years old in 1994 while awaiting her Senior Secondary School West African Examinations Council Certificate Examinations (WAEC) results.

== Education ==
Atuegwu completed her primary and secondary school education at the University Primary and Secondary schools in Enugu where she received several academic and non-academic prizes. During her time in Secondary School, she was a contributing writer and editor of Honour, her secondary school magazine.

Atuegwu studied pharmacy at the University of Nigeria Nsukka (UNN) for one semester. In 1996, she moved to the United States and subsequently studied pharmacy at Rutgers University. She received a Bachelor of Pharmacy and a doctorate degree in pharmacy (PharmD) in 2002. While in Rutgers University, she served as a contributing writer and copy editor for her pharmacy yearbook, Pharmascript.

In 2008, Atuegwu completed a master's degree in creative writing at Johns Hopkins University. In 2014 she received a master's in medication therapy management from the University of Florida. Atuegwu holds a certification from the American Medical Writers Association (AMWA).

== Writing career ==
In 1994, Fourth Dimension Publishing Company founded by Arthur Nwankwo, published Atuegwu's first novel, Fate, the story of a doomed romantic relationship when she was 17 years old. Her second novel, Tears, was published shortly afterwards by B-Teks Publishing. Atuegwu's subsequent 15 books were all published within 8 months making her one of Nigeria's youngest authors. One of her children's books, The Magic Leaf, published in 1994, is a magic realism story set in Southeastern Nigeria. Her drama, My Husband's Mistress, was published in 1995. Some of her other books include Adventures of Nnanna (1995), Chalet 9 (1995), Bina and the Birthday Cake (1995), Bina and the Sailboat (1995), Bina at the Beach (1995), Bina at the Supermarket (1995), Bina at the Airport (1995), Lizzy's First Year at School (1995), Lizzy's Second Year at School (1995), and Lizzy's Third Year at School (1995).

On July 28, 1995, a press conference was held for Atuegwu at Enugu Press Centre. At this event, the then ex-lady of Enugu State, Mrs. Olusola Torey, wife to Colonel Mike Torey, described Atuegwu as a "child prodigy" and according to the media "one of the youngest most prolific writers with an aggressive creative writing talent and a literary whiz kid."

On May 31, 1996, Atuegwu's seventeen books were collectively launched in the city of Enugu in Nigeria under the slogan of "17 books at 17". At this event, General Sam Momah, former minister of science and technology in Nigeria, described her as a "literary genius and a gift to Nigeria."

Atuegwu's books were used in Nigeria as required textbooks and reading materials in primary, secondary, and tertiary institutions as well as for junior West African Examinations Council exams and other secondary school examinations. Atuegwu is considered one of the forerunners of the new era of young contemporary Nigerian writers. She is also considered one of the predecessors of third generation Nigerian writers. Atuegwu's books are available as audiobooks and braille. She is a member of PEN America.

== Charity and philanthropy ==
Atuegwu is an advocate for the disabled including the blind and visually-impaired through her involvement in Bina Foundation for People with Special Needs, a non-profit organization in Enugu, Nigeria. Her books, which are available in Braille and audio has been donated to various centers for the blind and visually impaired in Nigeria.

Atuegwu, through Bina Foundation, is also an advocate for disability inclusion especially for disability sports such as blind soccer. In 2022, Atuegwu was part of volunteers on the Nigeria's Star Eagles blind football team to Morocco for the International Blind Sports Federation (IBSA) Blind Football African Championships held in Bouznika, Morocco from September 14 to 26, 2022.

== Personal life ==
Atuegwu grew up in Enugu, Nigeria. She moved to New Jersey in 1996. She currently lives in Washington, D.C., with her family.

== Influences on others ==
=== Style ===
Atuegwu's Bina Series, a series of five books about a mischievous boy named after Atuegwu's younger brother, Obinna, inspired a Nigerian children's and teenage hairstyle known as Bina Haircut in the nineties and 2000s.

=== Authors ===
In 2019, author Ever Obi, a novelist, who had never met Atuegwu but was inspired by her age at first publication, dedicated his first published novel, Men Don't Die, to Atuegwu saying for "Adaeze Atuegwu...in whose works and writings I found my childhood muses."

== Awards ==
- 1993: World Health Day Essay Competition (Nigeria)
- 1994: Rotary International Award for Creativity
- 1995: Rotary International Award for Fostering Child Development
- 1996: Rotary International Award for Excellence in Writing
- 1996: Rotaract International Award for Creativity

== Selected biographies ==
- Fate, Enugu: Fourth Dimensions Publishers, 1994, ISBN 978-156-398-2; Cika Publishers, 1994, ISBN 978-2966-84-3
- Tears, Enugu: B-Teks Publishers, 1994, ISBN 978290404X; Cika Publishers, 1994, ISBN 978-2966-60-6
- Adventures of Nnanna, Enugu: Cika Publishers, 1995, ISBN 9783352911
- Chalet 9, Enugu: Cika Publishers, 1995, ISBN 978-33529-0-3
- My Husband's Mistress, Enugu: Cika Publishers, 1995, ISBN 978-33529-3-8
- The Magic Leaf, Enugu: Cika Publishers, 1995, ISBN 978-33529-2-X
- Bina and the Birthday Cake: Enugu: Cika Publishers, 1995, ISBN 978-33529-4-6, 978-2904-05-8
- Bina and the Sailboat, Enugu: Cika Publishers, 1995, ISBN 978-33529-8-9, 978-2904-06-6
- Bina at the Beach, Enugu: Cika Publishers, 1995, ISBN 978-2904-07-4
- Bina at the Supermarket, Enugu: Cika Publishers, 1995, ISBN 978-33529-7-0, 978-2904-08-2
- Bina at the Airport, Enugu: Cika Publishers, 1995, ISBN 978-33529-5-4, 978-2904-09-0
- Lizzy's First Year at School, Enugu: Cika Publishers, 1995, ISBN 978-33529-9-7
- Lizzy's Second Year at School, Enugu: Cika Publishers, 1995, ISBN 978-2966-12-6
- Lizzy's Third Year at School, Enugu, Cika Publishers, 1995
