= African Democratic Congress =

Political party in Nigeria

- Chairperson: David Mark
- Secretary: Rauf Aregbesola
- Founder: Ralph Nwosu
- Founded: 2005
- Headquarters: Abuja, Nigeria
- Ideology: Big Tent; Decentralization
- House of Representatives: 1 / 360
- Seats in the Senate: 8 / 109

Website
- adc.org.ng

The African Democratic Congress (ADC) is a political party in Nigeria. The first National Chairman of the party was Ralph Nwosu. He was the National Chairman until 2025, when he stepped down for former Senate President David Mark during coalition talks. The party had one member in the House of Representatives, Leke Abejide, currently representing Yagba East/Yagba West/Mopa Moro Federal Constituency of Kogi State. but he has defected to the APC since May 2026.

In 2025, former Vice President Atiku Abubakar left the Peoples Democratic Party to join the ADC as part of a coalition to challenge the APC in the 2027 election.

Peter Obi, former Labour Party presidential candidate, formally registered with the ADC in March 7 2026. On 3 May 2026, Obi announced his exit from the party, citing a worsening political climate marked by internal crises, legal disputes, and growing hostility within party structures. He clarified that his departure was not due to personal grievances against ADC leadership, including Chairman David Mark or Atiku Abubakar.

Following his exit, Obi and former Kano State governor Rabiu Kwankwaso both joined the Nigeria Democratic Congress (NDC) on Sunday 3 May 2026.

ADC leaders described the move as an attempt to prevent one-party rule by the All Progressives Congress, and to present a united front in the 2027 presidential elections. Analyst Iliyasu Hadi suggested that this realignment would lead to the ADC emerging as Nigeria's main opposition party.

On May 25, 2026 the ADC conducted its primary election for the 2027 Presidential election, where Atiku Abubakar emerged as the candidate of the party after polling 1,846,370 votes to defeat other aspirants - Rotimi Amaechi, who polled 504,117 votes, and Mohammed Hayatudeen, who polled 177,120 votes.

For the 2027 general elections, the ADC pegged its Presidential nomination fee at #100 million, governorship at #50 million, Senatorial at #20 million, House of Representatives #10 million, and House of Assembly at #3 million.

== History ==
The party was originally named "Alliance for Democratic Change" when it was formed in 2005, but renamed the African Democratic Congress by the time the party was registered with the Nigerian Independent National Electoral Commission (INEC). The goal of this name change was for the party to be able "to effectively encompass and reflect the aspirations of our people."

On 10 May 2018, the party was adopted by former Nigerian President Olusegun Obasanjo's political movement called the "Coalition for Nigeria Movement" (CNM). Obasanjo now serves as the chairman for the party. Per his speech titled "My Treatise For Future Of Democracy And Development In Nigeria", the goal of the CNM adopting the ADC was "to work with others for bringing about desirable change in the Nigeria polity and governance".

== Constitution ==
The African Democratic Congress outlines the details of the party and its workings. The party constitution contains a preamble, 27 articles, and three schedules. According to the constitution, the goal of the ADC is to be a "grassroots party" composed primarily of working-class and disadvantaged Nigerians. The constitution also outlines that membership of the ADC party is open to "every citizen of Nigeria irrespective religion, ethnic group, place of birth, sex, social or economic status".

== Leadership controversy ==
In 2026, the party became involved in a leadership dispute that resulted in multiple legal challenges.

The Independent National Electoral Commission (INEC) initially withdrew recognition of competing factions following a Court of Appeal ruling.

The Supreme Court later set aside aspects of the earlier rulings, after which INEC restored the David Mark-led leadership, although the substantive case remained pending before a Federal High Court.

== Elections ==
=== Presidential ===
In the 2007 Nigerian Presidential Election, the ADC put forth candidate Patrick Utomi. He obtained 50,849 votes, and placed 4th in the election.

In the 2011 Nigerian Presidential Election, its candidate was Rev. Peter Uchenna Nwangwu. He obtained 51,682 votes and placed 8th out of the 20 candidates in the election.

In the 2015 Nigerian Presidential Election, the ADC put forth Dr. Mani Ibrahim Ahmad as their candidate. He obtained 29,666 votes which was 0.10% of the votes cast. He placed 7th out of 14 candidates.

In the 2019 Nigerian Presidential Election, the ADC put forth candidate Obadiah Mailafia. He obtained 97,874 votes and placed 4th out of 73 candidates in the election.

For the selection of their candidates for the 2023 Nigerian Presidential Election, the ADC used the Indirect Primary method in which only accredited delegates participated in the nomination of candidates that would run on the platform of the party at the 2023 Nigerian general election. On 9 June 2022, the African Democratic Congress selected Dumebi Kachikwu as the candidate for the 2023 Nigerian general election Nigerian general elections.

=== Gubernatorial ===
These are the results obtained by ADC candidates in general Gubernatorial Elections in Nigeria:

2011
Candidate	State	Number of Votes Obtained	Place	Total Number of Candidates
Dr. Zainab Baba Mbila Kwonchi	Adamawa	2,846	5th	5
Tare-Otu Actor Lugard	Bayelsa	96	18th	35
Alhaji Abba Mohammed	Borno	1,223	10th	12
Chief Frederick Uzodinma	Enugu	42	16th	16
Osagide Lugard	Lagos	8,365	4th	15
Mallam Shehu Abdullahi	Sokoto	318	21st	30

2013
Candidate	State	Number of Votes Obtained	Place	Total Number of Candidates
Chief Anayo A. Arinze	Anambra	699	9th	23

2014
Candidate	State	Number of Voted Obtained	Place	Total Number of Candidates
Oroko Bola	Ekiti	542	10th	18
Comrde Gabriel G. Ojo	Osun	1,783	9th	20

=== Senatorial ===
These are the results obtained by ADC candidates in general Senatorial Elections in Nigeria:

2011
Candidate	State	District	Number of Votes Obtained	Place	Total Number of Candidates
Chief Kenneth C. Modekwe	Anambra	Anambra Central	1,870	5th	11
Chief O.C. Ebeze	Anambra	Anambra North	4,005	5th	12
Chukwunwike Nweke	Anambra	Anambra South	902	9th	12
Alh Abdulkadir Suleiman	Borno	Borno Central	1,256	7th	7
Barde Auwal Abba	Gombe	Gombe South	357	5th	5
Ibrahim Suleiman	Kaduna	Kaduna Central	1,366	7th	7
Ibrahim Suleiman	Kaduna	Kaduna North	564	6th	6
Abdullahi M. Bamalli	Kaduna	Kaduna South	827	7th	8
Isa Muhd Chiomawa	Kano	Kano Central	2,430	7th	12
Lawan Mai'unguwwa	Kano	Kano North	3,133	7th	8
Amini Shittu	Kano	Kano South	3,210	5th	8
Ibrahim Shehu Idris	Katsina	Katsina Central	770	9th	9
Abdullahi Shehu	Katsina	Katsina South	2,891	7th	7
Ibrahim Shehu Idris	Kebbi	Kebbi South	846	6th	6
Abdullahi Tank	Kogi	Kogi Central	148	9th	12
Uwani Ibrahim	Kogi	Kogi East	1,314	5th	8
Ameen O. Wahab	Kwara	Kwara Central	1	12th	12
Alh. Musa Hassan	Niger	Niger East	1,486	5th	5
Mohammed Abdullahi	Niger	Niger North	918	6th	6
Abdullahh Abubakar	Niger	Niger South	11,991	4th	7
Soba Moh'd Zakabiya	Plateau	Plateau North	2,423	7th	10

=== House of Representatives ===
In 2015, there were five ADC members in the House of Representatives and represented constituencies in Oyo State. Hon. Abiodun Olasupo represents the Iseyin/Itesiwaju/Kajola/Iwajowa constituency. Hon. Adeyemi Sunday Adepoju represents the Ibarapa East/Ido constituency. Hon. Olusunbo Samson represents the Oluyole Local Govt. constituency Hon. Lam Adedapo represents the Ibadan North-East/ Ibadan South-East constituency. Hon. Akintola Taiwo represents the Ona-Ara/Egbeda constituency.
