= Edo College =

Nigerian grammar school

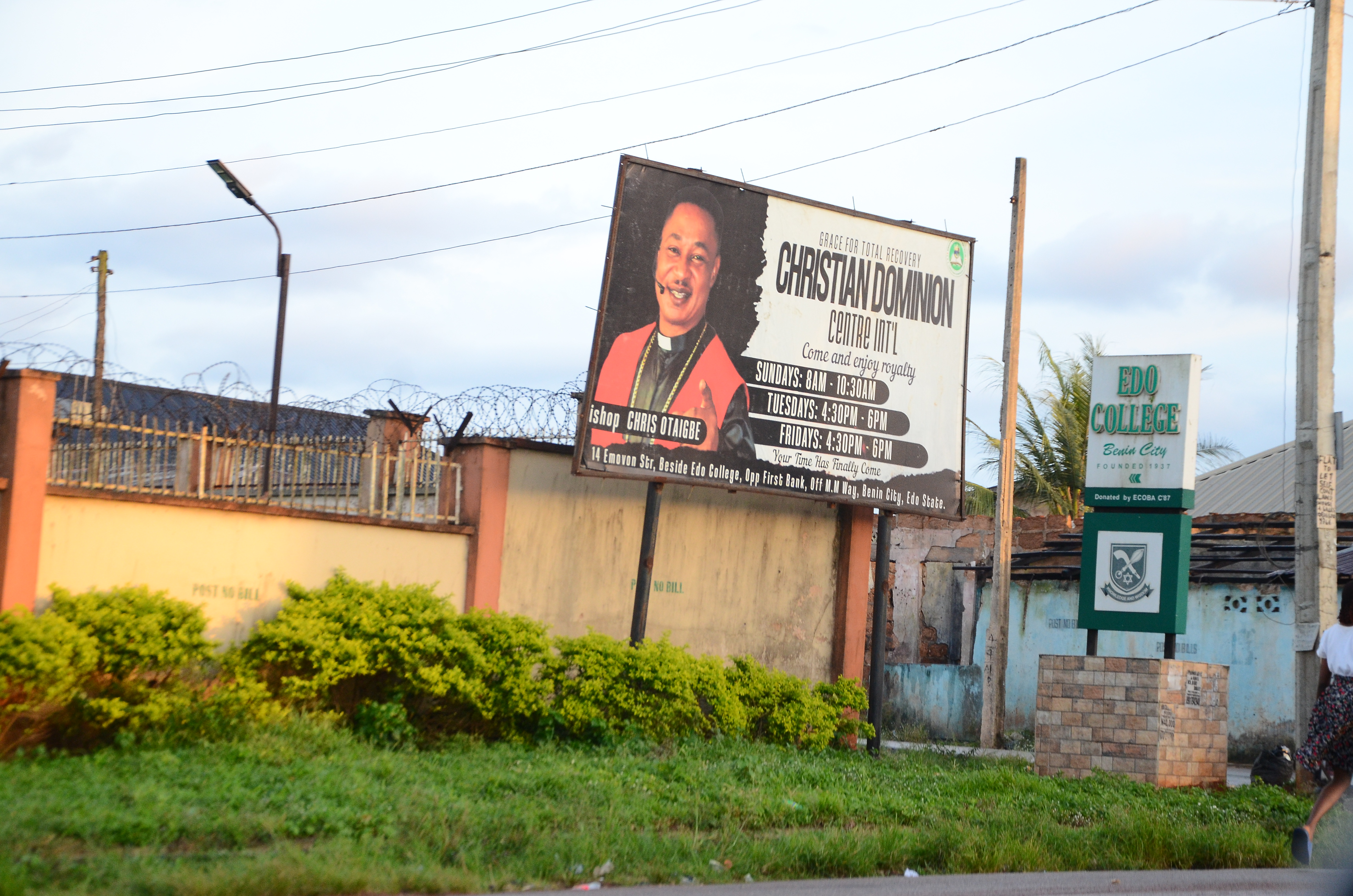
- Benin; Nigeria

Information
- Established: 1937
- Annual tuition: 60000
- Website: edocollegebenin.com

Edo College is a secondary grammar school in Benin City, Nigeria, the oldest in the Mid-Western Region. It was established in February 1937 and started as the Benin Middle School with forms, I, II and III. In April 1937, the school, with a total student enrollment of 76 pupils, moved from its temporary site at the old Government School, Benin City to a permanent site, the present Idia College premises. In 1973, the school further moved from Idia College premises to its present site along Murtala Mohammed Way, Benin City, Edo state in the federal Republic of Nigeria.

With the Government take-over of schools in the state in 1973, the management of the College went from the direct control of the Ministry of Education to the Board of Education with particular reference to the appointment and deployment to staff to the school.

== Curriculum ==
Edo College has undergone many evolutionary changes in its educational structure. It had initially began as a day school, then boarding school for boys only but reverted to day school in the 1980s. In the mid-1990s it briefly had a dichotomous structure, day and evening school. Recently following donations from its most successful alumni it is now moving towards boarding school with a total student population of 800 and an average tuition of 60,000 Naira.

Subjects taught include:

- English language
- French
- Edo Language,
- Geography/History,
- English Literature,
- Business Studies,
- Home Economics/Food & Nutrition,
- Religious Studies,
- Physics,
- Chemistry,
- Biology,
- Agricultural Science,
- Computer Science/ICT
- Mathematics,

Others includes, Additional Mathematics (pre-calculus), Art & Design, Music, Introductory Technology, Design Technology, Performing Arts, and Physical Education.

All these subjects are carefully woven throughout the 3-3 format of the Nigerian secondary school system. That is 3 years of Junior Secondary School and 3 years of Senior secondary school. A pre-undergraduate level, the Higher School Certificate (HSC) /Advanced School Certificate (A-level), is being reintroduced.

== Notable alumni ==
- David Dafinone, accountant and politician
- Emmanuel Emovon, former vice-chancellor of the University of Jos
- Ewuare II, Oba of Benin
- Lucky Igbinedion, former two-time governor, Edo State, Nigeria (1999 - 2003)
- Tom Ilube, Chair of The King’s Trust
- Osagie Ize-Iyamu, former chief of staff and secretary to the Edo State government
- Nduka Obaigbena, newspaper publisher
- Chris Okotie, pastor and president of the Fresh Democratic Party
- Ifeanyi Okowa, former two-time governor, Delta State, Nigeria (2015 - 2023)
- Chris Oyakhilome, pastor
