= Hammersmith Academy =

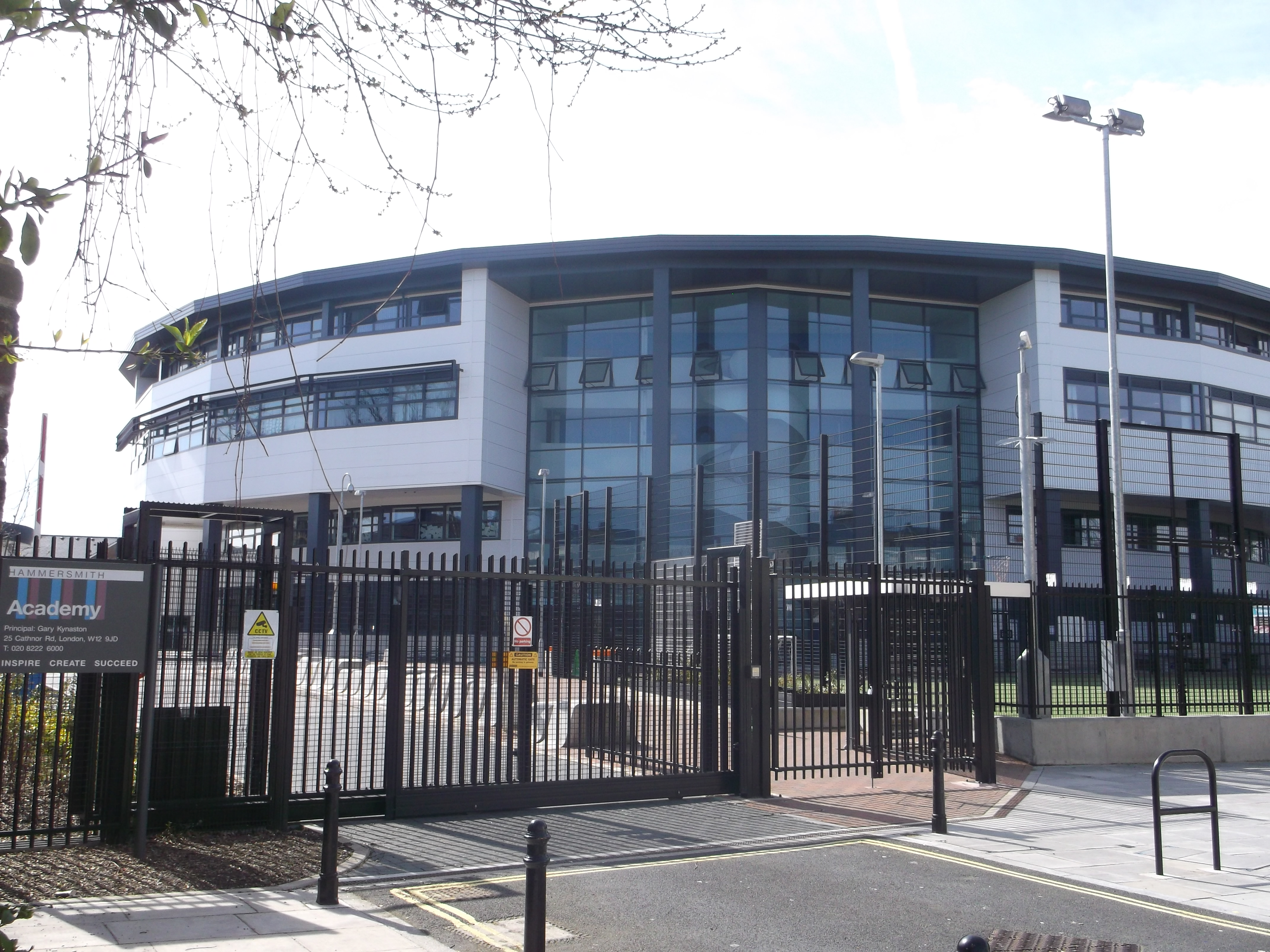
- The Academy in 2013

Location
- Cathnor Road; Hammersmith, London, UB5 4RU; England; 51.5021°N 0.2362°W

Information
- Type: Academy
- Motto: Inspire, Create, Succeed
- Established: 11 September 2011
- Founders: Tom Ilube, Stefan Fafinski Lady Wendy Parmley
- Local authority: London Borough of Hammersmith and Fulham
- Specialist: Creative & Digital Media and Information Technology
- Department for Education URN: 136172 Tables
- Ofsted: Reports
- Headteacher: Gary Kynaston
- Gender: Coeducational
- Age: 11 to 18
- Enrolment: 936
- Houses: Lovelace, Attenborough, Johnson, McQueen, Khan
- Colours: Grey and maroon
- Website: hammersmithacademy.org

Hammersmith Academy is a non-denominational, all-ability, co-educational secondary academy for 11- to 18-year-olds specialising in creative and digital media and information technology, located in the London Borough of Hammersmith and Fulham, West London, England.

Opened in September 2011, the Academy is jointly sponsored by the Worshipful Company of Mercers (the oldest livery company in the City of London) and the Worshipful Company of Information Technologists (the 100th Livery Company).

The academy is based in a four-storey building which has facilities such as a Theatre, Sports Hall, Library, Fitness Suite and Digital Editing & IT suites.

== Background ==
In 2006, only 38% of local children in the London Borough of Hammersmith and Fulham went to local state schools. This led the council to launch its Schools of Choice programme which aimed to provide more choice to meet the growing demand for school places in the borough and reduce the need for parents to send their children to schools outside of Hammersmith and Fulham.

Plans were later announced in 2007 for the building of a new academy within the borough which would be sponsored by the Mercers' Company and the Information Technologists Company. The new academy would open in September 2010 and be designed to accommodate up to 780 mixed ability students aged 11–18, with the site of the former Stamford House young offenders selected.

The opening was later pushed back to September 2011 and building work began in June 2009. It was founded by Tom Ilube, a British-Nigerian entrepreneur and educational philanthropist, together with fellow members of the Information Technologists Company, Lady Parmley (Wendy) and Dr Stefan Fafinski DL.

== Facilities ==
The building encompasses:

- Large Learning Bases which provide flexible teaching areas for student groups
- Science Laboratories designed and equipped to provide large areas of accessible space for practical work
- Whiteboard technology in all teaching areas
- Independent Learning Centres with full access to online resources
- Library
- Video and Music editing space complete with green-screen and a radio station
- Two large technology workshops served by Computer Aided Design and Computer Aided Manufacture.
- Dance/Drama Studio with sprung floors and full length mirrors
- Theatre with tiered seating
- Multi Use Games Area and 250m running track
- Fitness Suite.
- Multi-purpose Sports Hall.
- Sen department

== Ofsted ==
- The Academy was rated as 'Good' with some 'Outstanding' features in its first Ofsted inspection despite being open less than 18 months.

== Year structure ==
The academic years are structured as: L for Ada Lovelace, A for David Attenborough, J for Katherine Johnson, M for Steve McQueen (director) and K for the architect Khan.

== GCSE Options ==
=== Mandatory ===
- Science
- Maths
- English
- Spanish
- RE
- PE ( practical )
- Either Geography or History

=== Optional ===
- Art
- Computer Science
- Design Technology
- Drama
- Economics
- Media studies
- Music
- PE ( Theory )
- Triple Science

*Students that know other languages other than Spanish are able to do that as a GCSE #

== Famous Visits ==
In 2015 Prince William visited Hammersmith academy for an anti-bullying campaign known as the Princess Diana anti-bullying campaign, The campaign focused on Cyber-bullying and LGBTQ+ bullying. Another famous visit was in the January of 2022 when the education secretary Nadhim Zahawi was invited for a tour around the academy, later on the BBC news he had positive opinions on the academy.
