= Ralph Nwosu =

Nigerian politician

Ralph Okey Nwosu
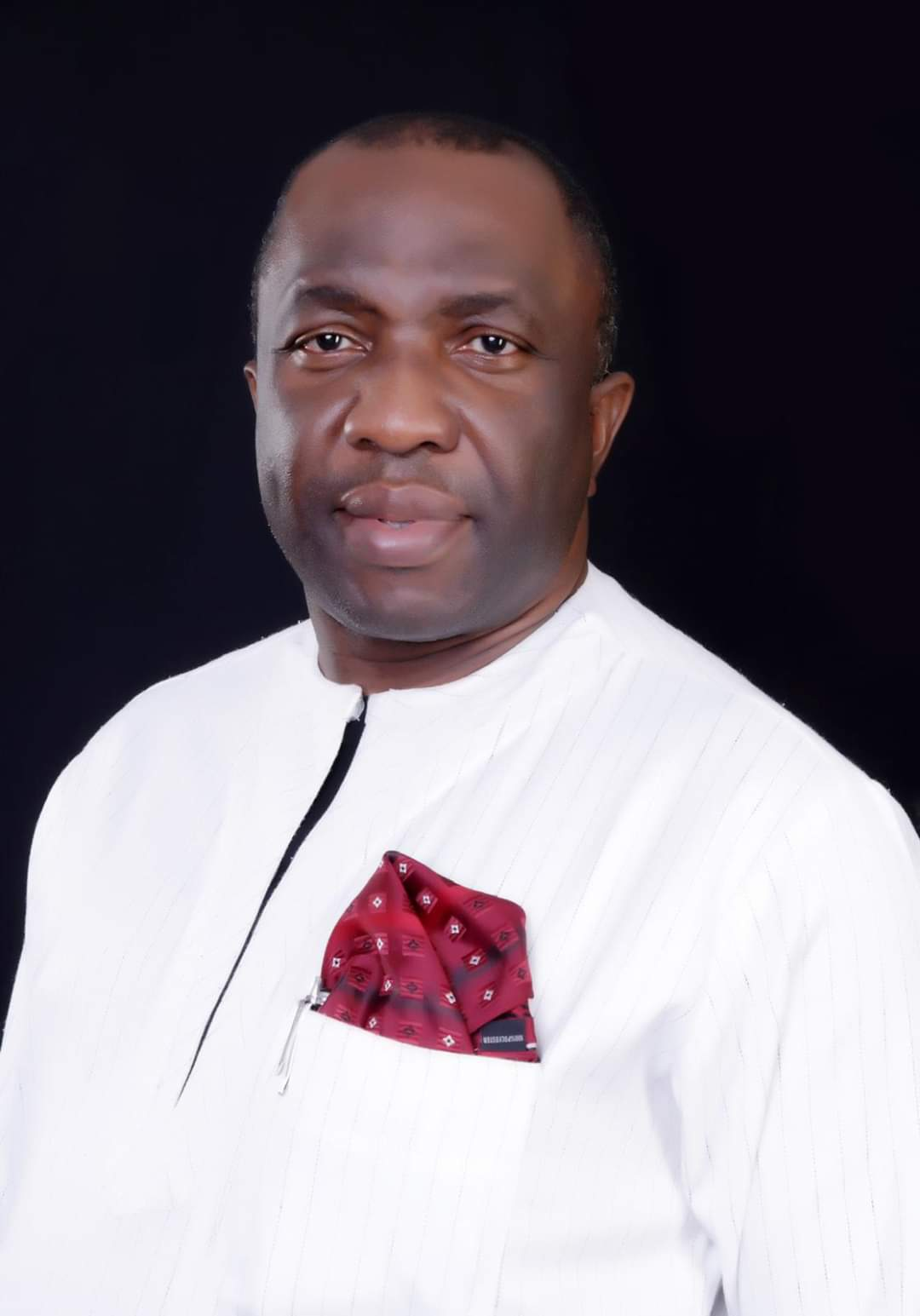

Pioneer National Chairman of the African Democratic Congress
- In office 2005–2025
- Succeeded by: David Mark

Personal details
- Born: Awka, Anambra State
- Party: ADC
- Education: St. Edward's University; Norwich University; Antioch University

Ralph Okey Nwosu is the founder and the pioneer national chairman of the African Democratic Congress (ADC) and was the co-chairman of the Inter-Party Advisory Committee (IPAC), the umbrella body of registered political parties in Nigeria, election committee in 2016.

== Background and education ==
Ralphs Okey Nwosu was born in Awka, Anambra State. Holds the traditional title of Ikolo Dike Orabueze Awka bestowed on him in 1994, and is a member of the cabinet. Nwosu is a practicing Catholic.

He graduated from St. Edward's University, Austin Texas, USA, in 1982, he majored in chemistry with a minor in Liberal Arts. He has a Master of Science in Organizational Leadership (MSOL) from Norwich University, Northfield, Vermont, USA, PhD program in leadership Change and likewise, Seminal Studies at Antioch University, Ohio, USA.

== Career and political activities ==
Nwosu is the founder and the pioneer National Chairman of the African Democratic Congress ADC, a third force political party in Nigeria and former President Inter-Party Advisory Council of Nigeria (IPAC).

Nwosu formed a coalition with the Coalition of United Political Parties (CUPP) to stop the re-election of President Muhammadu Buhari and the All Progressive Congress (APC) from power in 2019.

He also led the African Democratic Congress (ADC) to merge with the Coalition of Nigeria Movement (CNM) formed by former Nigerian President, Olusegun Obasanjo.

In 2022, After the 48 hours of electricity blackout nationwide due to grid collapse, he condemned President Muhammadu Buhari's ineptitude and lack of political will to ensure a constant power supply in the country.

He owns and runs St. Flairs, and a tech hub - Digital Oxygen hub ltd.
