= Tom Ilube =

British entrepreneur

Tom Ilube CBE
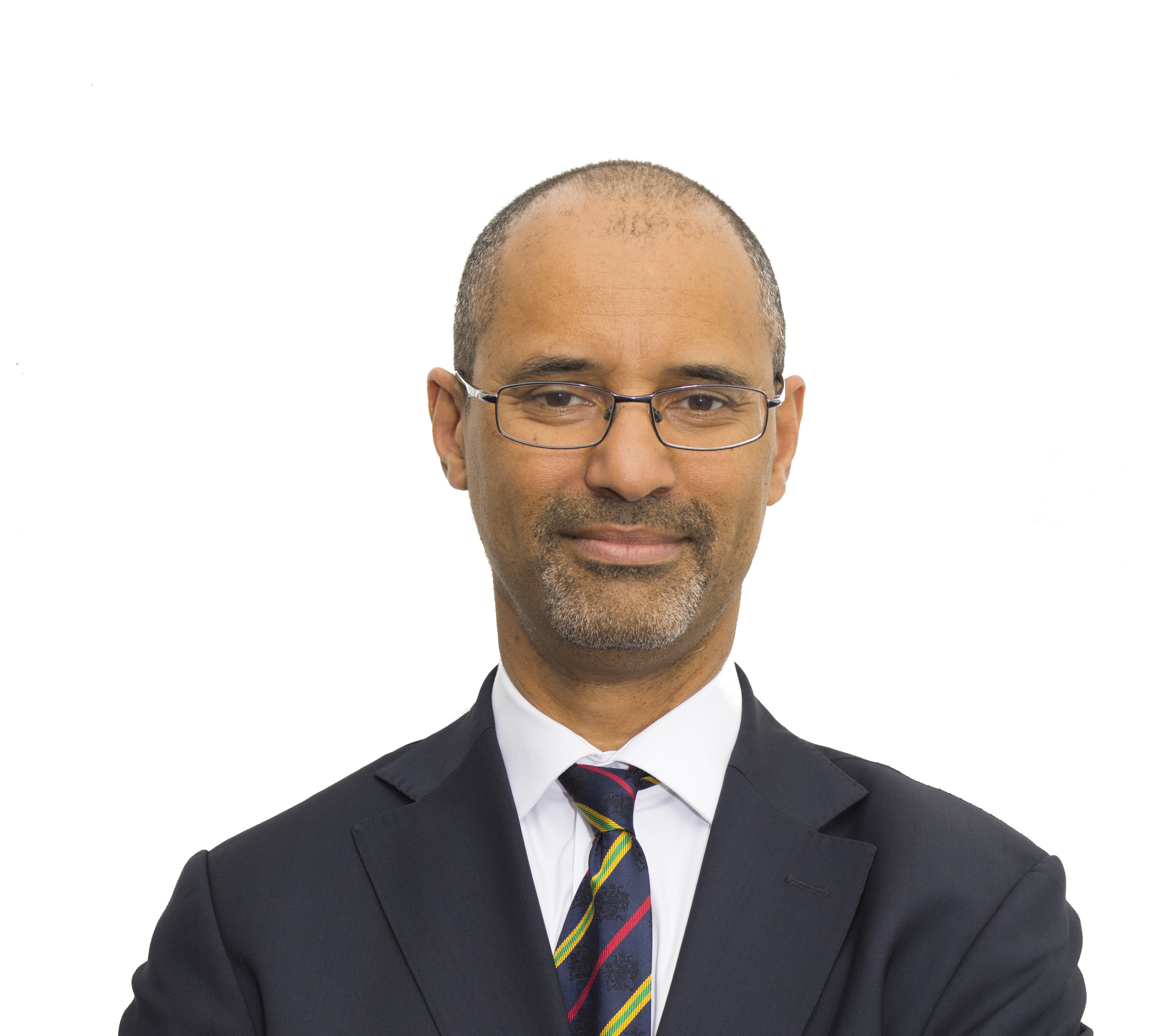
- Tom Ilube in 2016
- Born: Thomas Segun Ilube; July 1963 (age 63); Richmond, Surrey, England
- Education: Teddington School; Edo College
- Alma mater: University of Benin; Cass Business School
- Occupations: Entrepreneur and educational philanthropist
- Children: 2
- Website: africangifted.org

Thomas Segun Ilube CBE (/ɪˈluːbeɪ/ il-OO-bay; born July 1963) is a British entrepreneur and educational philanthropist and former chair of the Rugby Football Union making him the first black chair of a major sport in England. He is the Chair of The King's Trust in the UK. He is also Chairman of LINK, the UK's cash access and ATM network.

== Early life ==
Ilube was educated at Teddington School, in Richmond-upon-Thames and Edo College in Benin City, Nigeria, followed by a bachelor's degree in physics from the University of Benin. He later received a master's degree in business administration from London's Cass Business School.

== Career ==
Ilube was chief information officer (CIO) for the internet bank Egg.

Ilube founded the Hammersmith Academy, a state secondary school in Hammersmith, west London, which opened in September 2011 and has become one of the UK's "most innovative technology schools".

He has created and launched several early stage technology companies including Noddle, a credit reference service, Garlik, the online identity company Crossword Cybersecurity plc, a cyber security company and Iternal, a Bristol-based MedTech start up.

Ilube was a non-executive director of the BBC, from April 2017, stepping down in June 2021 to take up the role of chair of the Rugby Football Union (RFU), and a non-executive director of FTSE100 company WPP plc, the world's largest advertising company by revenue, effective October 2020. He resigned from the RFU in December 2024.

== Charity ==
Ilube is the chair and founder of the African Gifted Foundation, a UK education charity focused on science and technology in Africa. They recently launched the African Science Academy, Africa's first all-girls science and maths academy. He was chair of Ada, the National College for Digital Skills. which opened in 2016 as the first brand new UK further education college in 23 years.

Ilube provides the prize money for the Nommo Awards for African science fiction and speculative fiction, announced at the Ake Book Festival in 2016 and hosted at WorldCon in Glasgow in 2024.

== Recognition ==
He was the first recipient of the City Livery Club centenary "Root and Branch" Award in 2014, presented by The Princess Royal.

In October 2016, Ilube was named by Powerlist as the most influential black person in the UK after topping the annual list of the 100 most powerful people of African and African Caribbean heritage in Britain.

Ilube received the 2017 Beacon Award for innovation in philanthropy, and in the same year, New African magazine listed Ilube as one of Africa's most influential people.

Ilube was appointed a Commander of the Order of the British Empire (CBE) in the 2018 Birthday Honours for services to Technology and Philanthropy.

In 2018, Ilube was elected an advisory fellow of St Anne's College, Oxford, and subsequently elected an honorary fellow in 2021. In 2020 he was elected an honorary fellow of Jesus College, Oxford. Ilube was awarded honorary doctorates by the University of Wolverhampton in 2005., City St George's University, London in 2018, the University of Benin in 2021, the University of Portsmouth in 2022, Coventry University in 2022 and Birmingham City University in 2024 and University of Warwick in 2026

In October 2021, Ilube appeared on BBC Radio 4's Desert Island Discs.
