= Mojisola Adekunle-Obasanjo =

Nigerian army major (born 1944)

- Born: Mojisola Adekunle; 10 August 1944; British Nigeria
- Died: 4 June 2009 (aged 64) Lagos, Nigeria
- Allegiance: Nigeria
- Branch: Nigerian Army
- Rank: Major
- Spouse: Olusegun Obasanjo (m. 1991; div. 1998)
- Children: 5

Mojisola Adekunle-Obasanjo (10 August 1944 – 4 June 2009) was a Nigerian military officer and politician. She founded the Masses Movement of Nigeria (MMN) party in 1998, which she ran under as a candidate for the presidency in the 2003 elections, which she happened to be the only female contender on the ballot paper for the 2007 presidential elections. She was also the ex-wife of former Nigerian President Olusegun Obasanjo.

Adekunle-Obasanjo died on 4 June 2009, at her daughter's residence at Ikoyi, Lagos after a brief illness. She was survived by four children and numerous grandchildren.

== Political career ==
Mojisola worked as a Radiologist with the Nigerian Army for most of her career before she retired to run for office. In 2003, Mojisola ran as a presidential candidate in the national and Gubernatorial election. She received a total number of 157,560 votes which was equivalent to 0.40% of the approved votes.

She also ran in the 2007 Nigerian Elections and was defeated.
