= The Black Heart Foundation =

UK and US registered charity

The Black Heart foundation was created in 2013, along with its scholarship programme. They aim to provide gap funding that supports young people who would otherwise not be able to achieve their ambitions or potential through Further or Higher Education. From 2013 to 2020, the Foundation provided Scholarships to 100 young people, 85% of whom are BAME, and who studied at 57 academic institutions in the UK. The Foundation is a registered charitable enterprise in both the United Kingdom and the United States. It was initially founded on private funds, but continues to receive support in the form of funding from individuals and families as well as donations and contributions from corporate supporters who make both financial contributions and contributions consisting of products, services and personnel. 100% of all donations made to the Foundation are passed along to beneficiaries via awards and bursaries with no discount or fee for administration and overhead. The foundation does not take a cut of the money it receives in donations.

== Each Day, Every Day Crowdfunding Campaign ==
On the 8th July 2020, the Foundation launched a crowdfunding campaign that raised an additional £1.5 million, including backing from Stormzy, to support a further 150 scholars. The campaign raised a total of 250,000 from the public within its first week which was then matched, pound for pound, by the board of the foundation which brought the total to 500,000 in only one week. The aim of each day, every day was to double the number of scholars supported by the foundation from 100 to 200. In addition to members of the public and Stormzy, notable donors to the campaign include Matt Dawson (former England rugby captain) and Michael Vaughan (former England cricket captain) who now appear as trustees on the foundation website. The crowdfunding campaign came following the Black Lives Matter protests that were going on in both the US and the UK. Ric Lewis, who topped the 2019 Powerlist of Britain’s most influential black people and is the founder and Chairman of the Board of the Black Heart Foundation, began the crowdfunding campaign in response to the ongoing situation.

== Support a Scholar ==
The foundation has the option to “support a scholar” and become an ambassador, landing yourself in their foundation hall of legends, by donating a one-time gift of £10,000.

== Trustees ==
Brian Burke

Brian is a former VP Fixed Income Sales and Trading at Goldman Sachs and Morgan Stanley. He Is currently the owner of Metro NY, a US-based healthy vending business. Brian has been involved with US-based Student Sponsor Partner program for 27 years. He holds an AB in Economics from Dartmouth College.

Matt Dawson

Matt is a former England Rugby Captain and World Cup Winner. Retiring in 2006 he is now a Strategic Sales Consultant for The Instant Group as well as sitting on the Regional Leadership Committee at global FM outsourcer, Sodexo. He works for BBC Radio as their main rugby summariser and served as captain on BBC One’s flagship show ‘A Question Of Sport’.

Olivia Griffiths

Olivia is COO and Chief People Officer at Tristan Capital Partners. She previously held the role of Managing Director of Operations, having joined Tristan originally in 2016 as Head of Marketing and Communications. Prior to Tristan, Olivia was a Director at CNC Communications & Network Consulting, a strategic consultancy owned by Publicis Groupe. Olivia previously worked at Man Group plc (Man), an alternative investment manager and started her career at M&G. Olivia has a BA (Hons) degree in Public Relations from Bournemouth University.

== Their work ==
The foundation spent £2.47 million on charitable expenditure in 2023, as well as close to £309 thousand on raising funds. It was initially founded to continue the work of organisations that came before it, both in the US and the UK, that centred around a concern for the education of at-risk youth and providing them with access to opportunities that they would otherwise not have access to. They focus on helping children from disadvantaged backgrounds, low-resource environments, and those who are otherwise ‘at-risk’ due to poor health or nutrition, care or focus. These kinds of children benefit greatly from the kind of support that an organisation like this can provide, by funding their education and programs that work to support their education as well as their overall well-being. The foundation aims to support programs that support young people at the grassroots level and to invest in areas that will make the biggest difference. The Blackheart Foundation supports students with education ranging from formal academic learning to vocational field studies, providing many different opportunities and supporting multiple career paths for young people. They acknowledge that both physical and mental health play a massive role in academic success, and take a keen interest in programmes that utilise sports to develop education about the topics of “health, personal wellbeing, aspiration and pathways to success”. The foundation is currently supporting a number of community initiatives that use sport in this way to support and uplift disadvantaged young people, and to inspire them to take a greater interest in their own educational success.

== The scholarship programme ==
In 2013 The Foundation launched The Black Heart Scholarship Programme, which provides bursaries every year to several students who qualify. It supports their educational aspirations, primarily in the US and the UK, and is open to all stages from preparatory to postgraduate education and both formal and experiential learning and teaching. The application process involves writing a personal summary of up to 1200 words detailing the educational endeavour that the funding is requested for, and how it would align with the foundation’s aims to provide it to you. The programme provides gap funding, meaning that funding is assigned on a case by case bases depending on the individual circumstances and needs.

The foundation has since added The Art Scholarship Programme, which focuses on supporting underprivileged young people who represent a diverse future generation of the arts. The application is similar to the main scholarship programme, but applicants must also include a portfolio showcasing their existing art and personal style alongside the personal summary and application forms. The UK government has also plans to cut funding for art and design courses by 50% across higher education institutions in England, so the foundation hopes that this scholarship will help to counteract the effect of the funding cuts which are widening the gap for young people to participate in the arts.

== Beneficiaries ==
Beneficiaries of the foundation include:

- The institute of imagination
- Eastside Young Leaders Academy
- Great Ormond Street hospital
- King Soloman Academy
- Grassroot Soccer
- South Hampstead High School
- Portobello Dance School
- YMCA
- Beat eating disorders
- Sported
- Music of life
- Urban Land Institute
