= Nigerian Army Officers' Wives Association =

The Nigerian Army Officers' Wives Association (NAOWA) is a non-profit, non-governmental organization with the objectives of assisting the poor and the needy and raising the standard of living in the barracks of the nation. Since its establishment over four decades ago, NAOWA has been in the vanguard of the provision of community health centres to complement the health care delivery services and carefully designed welfare programmes that are targeted at women, youths, children and the less privileged in Nigeria. The organisation has been described as "the most powerful women's organisation in the country".

== History and activities ==
=== Origins ===
NAOWA began in the 1950s as 'Army Wives Association' (AWA). The association ventured into charitable activities during the tenure of Welby Everald between 1962 and 1965. Members were encouraged to donate to orphanages, thus forming the basis for the modern aims and objectives of the association.

The name of the association was changed to Nigerian Army Officers' Wives Association (NAOWA) on attainment of Nigeria's Republican status in 1963. Victoria Aguyi-Ironsi was the first indigenous president of the association. Since then, NAOWA has had 23 distinguished successive national presidents with varying lengths of tenure. Since the association is non-governmental and non-profit making with no subvention from either federal or state government, most of its programmes are derived through the benevolence of individuals and corporate bodies. The current president of the Association is Mrs. Mernan Femi Oluyede, wife of the current Chief of Army Staff (COAS) Lieutenant General Olufemi Olatubosun Oluyede. She is preceded by Mrs Mariya Abiodun Lagbaja, wife of the late COAS, Lieutenant General Taoreed Abiodun Lagbaja who died on the 5th of November 2024.

=== Initiatives ===
Over the years, NAOWA has established day-care centers, schools, skill acquisition centers, shopping malls, and children's parks in different locations across the country.

The vocational training centers are designed to complement the welfare programs of the Nigerian Army and the federal government. Their establishment aims to address the educational imbalance in barracks and their immediate surroundings by producing self-employed individuals who can establish their businesses and create employment opportunities. Additionally, the center aims to assist military personnel in acquiring basic skills to become self-sustaining and self-reliant upon retirement. The training programs at the center are moderated by the Nigerian Army School of Finance and Administration (NASFA), the Industrial Training Fund (ITF), and the National Board for Technical Education (NBTE).

NAOWA has initiated the Girl Child Education Programme (GCEP) campaign in several states of the federation to improve access to education and promote equal opportunities for girls.

== Magazine ==
NAOWA publishes a magazine as the mouthpiece of the association, showcasing its activities and write-up on topical issues, opinion and comments, socio-cultural, entertainment and political events across the globe. The magazine is published annually and it enjoys a wide readership and circulation to all military formations across the country. The maiden and second edition of the magazine were published in 2007 and 2008 respectively.
