= 2007 Nigerian House of Representatives elections in Bayelsa State =

2007 Nigerian House of Representatives elections in Nasarawa State

The 2007 Nigerian House of Representatives elections in Nasarawa State was held on April 21, 2007, to elect members of the House of Representatives to represent Nasarawa State, Nigeria.

== Overview ==
Affiliation	Party		Total
Affiliation	AC	PDP	Total
Before Election	-	2	5
After Election	-	5	5

== Summary ==
District	Incumbent	Party	Elected Reps Member	Party
Brass/Nembe	Kalango Youpele	PDP	Nelson Belief	PDP
Ogbia	Clever Ikisikpo	PDP	Clever Ikisikpo	PDP
Sagbama/Ekeremor			Henry Seriake Dickson	PDP
Southern Ijaw	Ere E. Fereinsikumo	APGA	Egberibin Donald Jacob	PDP
Yenagoa/Kolokuna/Opokuma			Warman Weri Ogoriba	PDP

== Results ==
=== Brass/Nembe ===
PDP candidate Nelson Belief won the election, defeating other party candidates.

2007 Nigerian House of Representatives election in Nasarawa State
Party	Candidate	Votes	%
PDP	Nelson Belief		
PDP hold			

=== Ogbia ===
PDP candidate Clever Ikisikpo won the election, defeating other party candidates.

2007 Nigerian House of Representatives election in Nasarawa State
Party	Candidate	Votes	%
PDP	Clever Ikisikpo		
PDP hold			

=== Sagbama/Ekeremor ===
PDP candidate Henry Seriake Dickson won the election, defeating other party candidates.

2007 Nigerian House of Representatives election in Nasarawa State
Party	Candidate	Votes	%
PDP	Henry Seriake Dickson		
PDP hold			

=== Southern Ijaw ===
PDP candidate Egberibin Donald Jacob won the election, defeating other party candidates.

2007 Nigerian House of Representatives election in Nasarawa State
Party	Candidate	Votes	%
PDP	Egberibin Donald Jacob		
PDP hold			

=== Yenagoa/Kolokuna/Opokuma ===
PDP candidate Warman Weri Ogoriba won the election, defeating other party candidates.

2007 Nigerian House of Representatives election in Nasarawa State
Party	Candidate	Votes	%
PDP	Warman Weri Ogoriba		
PDP hold			
