= Chris Okotie =

Nigerian pastor and televangelist (born 1958)

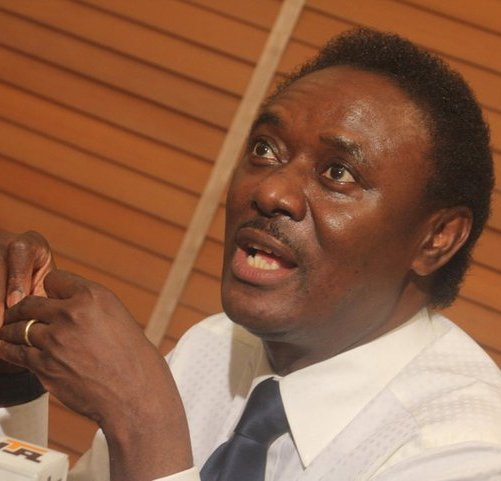
- Chris Okotie, 2011, Lagos

President of Fresh Democratic Party
- Incumbent
- Assumed office 2011

Senior Pastor, Household of God Church

Personal details
- Born: 16 June 1958 (age 68) Ethiope East, Abraka, Delta State, Nigeria
- Party: Fresh Democratic Party (FDP)
- Education: University of Nigeria, Nsukka (LLB,1984)
- Occupation: Televangelist, politician, author, businessman
- Website: http://revchrisokotie.com/

Christopher Oghenebrorie Okotie (born 16 June 1958) is a Nigerian televangelist and the pastor of the Household of God Church International Ministries, a Pentecostal congregation in Lagos since February 1987.

== Personal life ==
Okotie was born to Francis Idje and Cecilia Okotie in Ethiope-West, Delta State (then Bendel State). As a growing child, he always loved to sing. While in secondary school at Edo College, Benin City, he belonged to the school's Music Club and usually entertained groups of people. He never considered commercialising his talent until his first year at university, when his father died. His hobbies include jogging, martial arts, and music.

== Education and career ==
He attended secondary school at Edo College, Benin City. In 1984, he graduated with a degree in law from the University of Nigeria at Nsukka. Okotie abandoned his schooling for a while to pursue a pop music career before his return abruptly. Okotie married twice and announced he has separated from his second wife on June 24, 2012.

He returned to school to complete his education and graduated with a law degree. Whilst undergoing law schoo,l he interrupted his schooling again to begin his religious ministries. Okotie attended the Grace Fellowship Bible School in Tulsa, Oklahoma, and, soon after, established the Household of God Ministry.

In 1990, Okotie established the annual Karis Awards, hosted by his church, to recognize and financially reward Nigerian citizens.

== Corona Virus ==
When the government of Nigeria declared the reopening of churches in August 2020 but made it compulsory for members to put on their nose masks or face shields, Pastor Okotie condemned the idea of using face shield claiming it would be a reversal of the veil that was broken on the day Christ died and therefore creating a separation between men and God.

== Grace programme/Karis Award ==
The GRACE Program/Karis Award is an annual charity event hosted at the church where he pastors; The HouseHold of God International Ministries, Lagos. The guiding philosophy being that greatness does not consist in being great but in the ability to make others great. The Karis Award gives recognition to Nigerians who have offered distinguished service to the nation but are not recognized nor rewarded for their contributions to nation building. Some recipients are Prof. Chike Obi, the mathematician (1996), D.I.G. Chris Omeben, a retired policeman (1997), Mr. Taiwo Akinwunmi who designed the national flag (1998), Hogan Bassey, former Commonwealth and World boxing champion (1999), Chief Michael Imodou, the Labour leader (2000), Chief Margaret Ekpo (2001), a nationalist and woman activist, Mallam Aminu Kano, a nationalist (2004) and Isaac Adaka Boro, a human rights activist (2005).

The GRACE Program also makes regular cash and material contributions to charity organizations such as the SOS Children Village, the Sunshine Foundation, Pacelli School for the Blind and Partially Sighted, Little Saints Orphanage, the Spinal Cord Injuries Association of Nigeria, and The Childcare Trust.

== Wealth ==
In 2011, Forbes estimated his net worth at US$3–10 million.

== Presidential runs ==
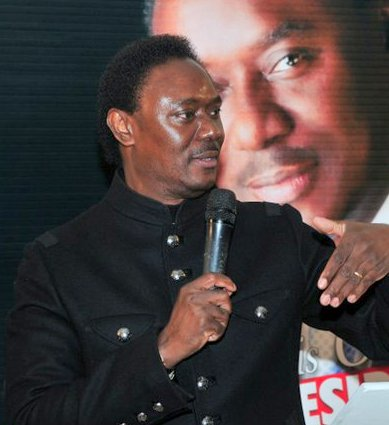
Okotie speaking at a press conference in 2011, Lagos

Okotie first ran for the president under the banner of the Justice Party (JP), led by Ralph Obiorah after he was schemed out of the National Democratic Party (NDP) primaries elections; he lost to Olusegun Obasanjo in the May 2003 elections. He ran again in 2007 on the platform of a party he founded, the Fresh Democratic party, FRESH and lost to Umaru Yar'Adua in the May 2007 elections. Then in 2011, he ran and lost to President Goodluck Jonathan.

== Controversies ==
Okotie had a public spat with fellow Nigerian cleric T.B. Joshua, referring to him as a 'deceptive magician'.

== Publications ==
Okotie has published books and is a regular contributor to several Nigerian newspapers.

- The Last Outcast (best-selling book, 2001)
- A terror war beyond hashtags
- A conference of geriatrics
- In search of game changers
- Power shift: what my readers say
- Why Vision 20:2020 became a lost cause
- State policies and prophetic solutions
- Adadevoh and the Ebola crisis
- A government stuck in timing response snafu
- This present assault on education
- Rage over villaleaks et al
- Time to shift governance paradigm
- 2015: Imperative of the paradigm shift option
- ASUU strike: implications of political infidelity
- Counting the cost of insecurity
- The looming demographic time bomb
- Reclaiming Nigeria's lost hope
