= 2007 Nigerian House of Representatives elections in the Federal Capital Territory =

Federal Capital Territory elections, Nigeria

The 2007 Nigerian House of Representatives elections in Federal Capital Territory was held on April 21, 2007, to elect members of the House of Representatives to represent Federal Capital Territory, Nigeria.

== Overview ==
| Affiliation | Party | | Total |
| Affiliation | ANPP | PDP | Total |
|---|---|---|---|
| Before Election | 1 | 1 | 2 |
| After Election | 1 | 1 | 2 |

== Summary ==
| District | Incumbent | Party | Elected Senator | Party |
|---|---|---|---|---|
| Abaji/Gwagwalada/Kwali/Kuje | Yusuf Baban Takwa | PDP | Isah Egah Dobi | PDP |
| Amac/Bwari | Tanimu P. Aduda | ANPP | Austen Peters-Pam Amanda Iyabode | ANPP |

== Results ==
=== Abaji/Gwagwalada/Kwali/Kuje ===
Party candidates registered with the Independent National Electoral Commission to contest in the election. PDP candidate Isah Egah Dobi won the election.

2007 Nigerian House of Representatives election in Federal Capital Territory
| Party | Candidate | Votes | % |
|---|---|---|---|
| PDP | Isah Egah Dobi | | |
| Total votes | | | |
| PDP hold | | | |

=== Amac/Bwari ===
Party candidates registered with the Independent National Electoral Commission to contest in the election. ANPP candidate Austen Peters-Pam Amanda Iyabode won the election.

2007 Nigerian House of Representatives election in Federal Capital Territory
| Party | Candidate | Votes | % |
|---|---|---|---|
| ANPP | Austen Peters-Pam Amanda Iyabode | | |
| Total votes | | | |
| ANPP hold | | | |
