= 2007 Nigerian House of Representatives elections in Kwara State =

The 2007 Nigerian House of Representatives elections in Kwara State was held on April 21, 2007, to elect members of the House of Representatives to represent Kwara State, Nigeria.

== Overview ==
| Affiliation | Party | | Total |
| Affiliation | ANPP | PDP | Total |
|---|---|---|---|
| Before Election | 2 | 4 | 6 |
| After Election | - | 6 | 6 |

== Summary ==
| District | Incumbent | Party | Elected Reps Member | Party |
|---|---|---|---|---|
| Asa/Ilorin West | Ogundairo S. Ajibade | PDP | Suleiman Nimota O | PDP |
| Baruten/Kaiama | Maimunat Adaji | ANPP | Maimunat Adaji | PDP |
| Edu/Moro/Patigi | Yunusa Y. Ahmed | PDP | Aliyu Ahman-Pategi | PDP |
| Ekiti/Isin/Irepodun/Oke-ero | Makanjuola G.P | PDP | Makanjuola G.P | PDP |
| Ilorin East/South | Z.O. Edun | PDP | Abdul-Wahab Oladimeji Isa | PDP |
| Offa/Oyun/Ifelodun | O.A. Adebola Oyedele | ANPP | Kolawole A Yusuf | PDP |

== Results ==
=== Asa/Ilorin West ===
PDP candidate Suleiman Nimota O won the election, defeating other party candidates.

2007 Nigerian House of Representatives election in Kwara State
| Party | Candidate | Votes | % |
|---|---|---|---|
| PDP | Suleiman Nimota O | | |
| PDP hold | | | |

=== Baruten/Kaiama ===
PDP candidate Maimunat Adaji won the election, defeating other party candidates.

2007 Nigerian House of Representatives election in Kwara State
| Party | Candidate | Votes | % |
|---|---|---|---|
| PDP | Maimunat Adaji | | |
| PDP hold | | | |

=== Edu/Moro/Patigi ===
PDP candidate Aliyu Ahman-Pategi won the election, defeating other party candidates.

2007 Nigerian House of Representatives election in Kwara State
| Party | Candidate | Votes | % |
|---|---|---|---|
| PDP | Aliyu Ahman-Pategi | | |
| PDP hold | | | |

=== Ekiti/Isin/Irepodun/Oke-ero ===
PDP candidate Makanjuola G.P won the election, defeating other party candidates.

2007 Nigerian House of Representatives election in Kwara State
| Party | Candidate | Votes | % |
|---|---|---|---|
| PDP | Makanjuola G.P | | |
| PDP hold | | | |

=== Ilorin East/South ===
PDP candidate Abdul-Wahab Oladimeji Isa won the election, defeating other party candidates.

2007 Nigerian House of Representatives election in Kwara State
| Party | Candidate | Votes | % |
|---|---|---|---|
| PDP | Abdul-Wahab Oladimeji Isa | | |
| PDP hold | | | |

=== Offa/Oyun/Ifelodun ===
PDP candidate Kolawole A Yusuf won the election, defeating other party candidates.

2007 Nigerian House of Representatives election in Kwara State
| Party | Candidate | Votes | % |
|---|---|---|---|
| PDP | Kolawole A Yusuf | | |
| PDP hold | | | |
