= 2007 Nigerian House of Representatives elections in Taraba State =

The 2007 Nigerian House of Representatives elections in Taraba State was held on April 21, 2007, to elect members of the House of Representatives to represent Taraba State, Nigeria.

== Overview ==
Affiliation	Party		Total
Affiliation	ANPP	PDP	Total
Before Election	-	6	6
After Election	-	6	6

== Summary ==
District	Incumbent	Party	Elected Reps Member	Party
Bali/Gassol	Dahiru Bako Gassol	PDP	Kabir Abdullahi Jalo	PDP
Jalingo/Yorro/Zing	Alhassan Al-Gaddas	PDP	Henry Mashogwawara Shawulu	PDP
Karim Lamido/Lau/Ardo-Kola	Khamin Taurus	PDP	Jerimon S Manwe	PDP
Sardauna/Gashaka/Kurmi	S.M. Nguroje	PDP	S.M. Nguroje	PDP
Takuma/Donga/Ussa	Emmanuel Bwacha	PDP	Albert Tanimu Sam Tsokwa	PDP
Wukari/Ibi	Ikenya Joel Danlami	PDP	Ishaika Mohammad Bawa	PDP

== Results ==
=== Bali/Gassol ===
PDP candidate Kabir Abdullahi Jalo won the election, defeating other party candidates.

2007 Nigerian House of Representatives election in Taraba State
Party	Candidate	Votes	%
PDP	Kabir Abdullahi Jalo		
PDP hold			

=== Jalingo/Yorro/Zing ===
PDP candidate Henry Mashogwawara Shawulu won the election, defeating other party candidates.

2007 Nigerian House of Representatives election in Taraba State
Party	Candidate	Votes	%
PDP	Henry Mashogwawara Shawulu		
PDP hold			

=== Karim Lamido/Lau/Ardo-Kola ===
PDP candidate Jerimon S Manwe won the election, defeating other party candidates.

2007 Nigerian House of Representatives election in Taraba State
Party	Candidate	Votes	%
PDP	Jerimon S Manwe		
PDP hold			

=== Sardauna/Gashaka/Kurmi ===
PDP candidate S.M. Nguroje won the election, defeating other party candidates.

2007 Nigerian House of Representatives election in Taraba State
Party	Candidate	Votes	%
PDP	S.M. Nguroje		
PDP hold			

=== Takuma/Donga/Ussa ===
PDP candidate Albert Tanimu Sam Tsokwa won the election, defeating other party candidates.

2007 Nigerian House of Representatives election in Taraba State
Party	Candidate	Votes	%
PDP	Albert Tanimu Sam Tsokwa		
PDP hold			

=== Wukari/Ibi ===
PDP candidate Ishaika Mohammad Bawa won the election, defeating other party candidates.

2007 Nigerian House of Representatives election in Taraba State
Party	Candidate	Votes	%
PDP	Ishaika Mohammad Bawa		
PDP hold			
