= Nii Moi Thompson =

Ghanaian Development Economist

- President: John Mahama

February 2025

Personal details
- Born: Bantama
- Education: City University of New York; State University of New York; University of Pittsburgh
- Profession: Economist

Dr. Nii Moi Thompson is a Ghanaian economist and development officer. In 2013, he was appointed the director-general of the National Development Planning Commission (NDPC) of Ghana and subsequently became its chairman in 2025. He also doubles as the senior advisor to the president on SDGS, Ghana.

== Early life and education ==
Thompson was born in Bantama in the Ashanti Region to Isaac Bannerman Nii Moi Thompson Snr. and Madam Esther Adoley Allotey. He left for Liberia and Sierra Leone to pursue his senior high school education. He obtained his first degree in General Economics from the City University of New York (Brooklyn College) and then went to University at Albany, SUNY for his Masters in International Economics. He obtained a doctorate in Development Economics and Public Policy from the University of Pittsburgh.
