= SThree =

British recruitment agency

SThree Plc
- Company type: Public
- Traded as: LSE: STEM
- ISIN: GB00B0KM9T71; US78484L1044
- Industry: Recruitment
- Founded: 1986
- Headquarters: London, UK
- Key people: James Bilefield, Chair; Timo Lehne, CEO; Damian Fehrenberg, CFO
- Revenue: ▼£1,302.2 million (2025)
- Operating income: ▼£26.1 million (2025)
- Net income: ▼£17.7 million (2025)
- Website: www.sthree.com

SThree plc is an international specialist staffing organisation, founded in the United Kingdom and headquartered in London. It is listed on the London Stock Exchange.

== History ==
The company was founded by Bill Bottriell and Simon Arber as a specialist recruitment business in 1986. Barclays provided development finance for the business in 1999 and it floated on the London Stock Exchange in 2005.

The Conservative politician Nadhim Zahawi MP was member of the board until October 2017.

== Operations ==
The Company provides permanent and contract specialist staffing services in the UK and Europe, Americas and AsiaPac and MENA regions, specializing in the Information Technology, Banking & Finance, Life Sciences, Engineering, and Energy sectors. It operates under a number of different brand names, including:

- Computer Futures
- Progressive
- Real Staffing Group
- Huxley Associates
- Global Enterprise Partners
