= 2007 Nigerian House of Representatives elections in Nasarawa State =

The 2007 Nigerian House of Representatives elections in Nasarawa State was held on April 21, 2007, to elect members of the House of Representatives to represent Nasarawa State, Nigeria.

== Overview ==
Affiliation	Party		Total
Affiliation	ANPP	PDP	Total
Before Election	-	5	5
After Election	-	5	5

== Summary ==
District	Incumbent	Party	Elected Reps Member	Party
Nasarawa/Toto	Samuel Egya	PDP	Samuel Egya	PDP
Lafia/Obi	Mohammed Al-Makura	PDP	Mohammed Al-Makura	PDP
Keffi/Karu/Kokona	Ahmed D. Aliyu	PDP	Ahmed D. Aliyu	PDP
Awe/Doma/Keana	Abdullahi S. Hashimu	PDP	Abdullahi S. Hashimu	PDP
Akwanga/Nasarawa/Eggon/Wamba	Patricia Akwashiki	PDP	Zakari Abdullahi Idde	PDP

== Results ==
=== Nasarawa/Toto ===
PDP candidate Samuel Egya won the election, defeating other party candidates.

2007 Nigerian House of Representatives election in Nasarawa State
Party	Candidate	Votes	%
PDP	Samuel Egya		
PDP hold			

=== Lafia/Obi ===
PDP candidate Mohammed Al-Makura won the election, defeating other party candidates.

2007 Nigerian House of Representatives election in Nasarawa State
Party	Candidate	Votes	%
PDP	Mohammed Al-Makura		
PDP hold			

=== Keffi/Karu/Kokona ===
PDP candidate Ahmed D. Aliyu won the election, defeating other party candidates.

2007 Nigerian House of Representatives election in Nasarawa State
Party	Candidate	Votes	%
PDP	Ahmed D. Aliyu		
PDP hold			

=== Awe/Doma/Keana ===
PDP candidate Abdullahi S. Hashimu won the election, defeating other party candidates.

2007 Nigerian House of Representatives election in Nasarawa State
Party	Candidate	Votes	%
PDP	Abdullahi S. Hashimu		
PDP hold			

=== Akwanga/Nasarawa/Eggon/Wamba ===
PDP candidate Zakari Abdullahi Idde won the election, defeating other party candidates.

2007 Nigerian House of Representatives election in Nasarawa State
Party	Candidate	Votes	%
PDP	Zakari Abdullahi Idde		
PDP hold			
