= National Democratic Party (Nigeria) =

Political party in Nigeria

The National Democratic Party is a progressive political party in Nigeria which was founded on 23 July 2001. It participated in the 2003 Nigerian presidential election, with former foreign minister Ike Nwachukwu running for the presidency; he won 0.34% of the vote.

At the 2023 Nigerian House of Representatives election, the party won zero out of 360 seats in the House of Representatives and no seats in the Senate.
