= Arthur Nwankwo =

Nigerian author and activist (1939–2020)

- Born: Arthur Agwuncha Nwankwo; 19 August 1939; Ajalli, Anambra State, Nigeria
- Died: 1 February 2020 (aged 80); Ituku-Ozalla, Enugu State, Nigeria
- Education: Eastern Mennonite University; Duquesne University
- Occupations: Author, publisher and pro-deomocracy activist

Arthur Agwuncha Nwankwo // (19 August 1939 – 1 February 2020) was a Nigerian author, publisher, and pro-democracy activist, who was chancellor of EMU, and former vice-chairman of the National Democratic Coalition. As Chancellor of the Eastern Mandate Union (EMU), Nwankwo championed a return to democratic governance during a military interlude in governance under General Sani Abacha. He was detained on June 3, 1998, and was released upon the sudden death of Abacha in the same month. In 2003, he unsuccessfully ran for president under the banner of the independent People's Mandate Party, a group created out of EMU. Nwankwo was the author of more than 20 books.

== Life ==
Nwankwo was born in Ajalli, Anambra State, Nigeria, on 19 August 1939. He completed his collegiate degree at Eastern Mennonite University in 1966 and then continued further studies at Duquesne University, where he obtained a master's degree. Upon graduating, he briefly worked for Gulf Oil as a consultant. At the onset of the Civil War, he returned to Nigeria where he joined the staff of the propaganda office of Biafra, where he also edited a weekly newsletter.

=== Career ===
In the early 1970s, Nwankwo began to gain some recognition within the literary community as part of a young group of post-Civil War writers from Southeastern Nigeria who wrote about their experience during the War. Prior to the end of the Nigerian Civil War, he co-authored the book Biafra: The Making of a Nation (1969), documenting the role of Igbos in Nigeria. Nwankwo also wrote Nigeria: The Challenge of Biafra. He started a career in publishing after the war ended, when he co-founded Nwamife Publishers with Samuel Ifejika, his co-author of Biafra: The Making of a Nation, and enjoyed the support and patronage of writers such as Flora Nwapa and Chinua Achebe. Nwamife published its first book in 1971, a compilation of stories written by various Igbo writers.

In 1977, he co-founded Fourth Dimension Publishing Company in Enugu with his brother publishing books such as Nigeria: The Stolen Billions.

From publishing, Nwankwo dived into the political ring in 1979, when he ran unsuccessfully as the governorship candidate of the People's Redemption Party in Anambra State. He later became a critic of Jim Nwobodo's administration, authoring two publications in which he accused Nwobodo of maladministration.

Prior to the Third Republic, Nwankwo initiated a public discourse with the publication of Cimilicy, a new form of government for Nigeria: its socialist implications. Cimilicy, a portmanteau of civilian, military and democracy is about a system of government that would ensure social and economic growth and cohesiveness in the public sphere. Ideas within the thesis include formal acceptance and incorporation of positive social developments policies that had been cultivated by civilian politicians, such as mass mobilization into the military and the incorporation of action orientated virtues of previous military rulers into civilian life, to reach a balance that ensures stability in the public sphere.

Nwankwo became chancellor of the Eastern Mandate Union in 1994 and led the organization to agitate for a return to democracy after the coup of General Sani Abacha. His activities during this period caught the attention of the government who detained him. In 1997, he led the EMU to partner with NADECO, becoming its vice-chairman.

He died on 1 February 2020 at the University of Nigeria Teaching Hospital, Ituku-Ozalla, Enugu State.

== Bibliography ==
- Biafra: The Making of a Nation, 1969
- Nigeria: The Challenge of Biafra, 1972
- Nigeria: My People, My Vision, 1980
- Can Nigeria Survive, 1981
- Nigeria: After Oil, What Next?, 1982
- How Jim Nwobodo Governs Anambra State, 1983
- Corruption in Anambra State, 1983
- Civilianised Soldiers: Army-Civilian Government for Nigeria, 1984
- National Consciousness for Nigeria, 1985
- The Igbo Leadership and the Future of Nigeria, 1985
- Nigeria: Development Strategy for the People’s Economy, 1986
- Justice (Sedition Charge, Imprisonment and Acquittal of Chief Arthur Nwankwo), 1986
- Arthur Nwankwo: Thoughts on Nigeria, 1986
- Military Option to Democracy: Class, Power and Violence in Nigerian Politics, 1987
- The Power Dynamics of Nigeria Politics, 1988
- Nigeria: The Political Transition and the Future of Democracy, 1993
- Nigeria: The Stolen Billions, 1999
- The Igbo Nation and the Nigerian State, 1999
