= Peter Nwangwu =

Nigerian academic

Peter Nwangwu // is a Umuahia, Abia State Igbo born man hailing from Anambra State, Nigeria. Peter Nwangwu, a professor of Pharmacology, Toxicology and Clinical Pharmacy, was the Vice Chancellor's Executive Assistance at University of Nigeria, Nsukka. In 2005, he was named the "Business Man of the Year 2005", by the Business Advisory Council of the United States, Washington alongside eleven other people selected or nominated for the award. In 2011, he became the African Democratic Congress, ADC' presidential candidate because according to him "Nigeria needs fine statesman, not politician".
