= Fresh Democratic Party =

Political party in Nigeria

The Fresh Democratic Party is a liberal political party in Nigeria. FRESH is an acronym, Faith, Responsibility, Equality, Security and Hope. The founder and presidential aspirant (2007) is Reverend Chris Okotie. The party believes in the unity and diversity of the Nigerian nation; the sanctity and collective will of the Nigerian people; the right of the Nigerian to good, accountable and compassionate leadership; and that federalism is the most effective form of co-existence in Nigeria.

A 50-page 2007 voters' guide, Who Deserves Your Vote, was criticised as being a medium to campaign for Okotie because it supports "a God fearing man of God as the true president that will take Nigeria to its next level". The author, Afo O Temienor, has stated that he has no personal relationship with Okotie, disputing claims that he is silently campaigning for him, "I am not campaigning for any single individual via my book, I am only trying to sharpen the discernment of the average voter to vote wisely. That does not mean I don't have a candidate of choice which dramatically turns out to be reverend Chris Okotie. In fact I intend to work with FRESH Party because I believe in his vision, but once again I didn't write my book because of him".
