= Prosperity Institute =

Think tank based in London, England

- Established: 2007 (19 years ago)
- Type: Think tank
- Headquarters: 11 Charles Street, London, W1J 5DW
- Location: London, England, UK
- Key people: Paul Coleman (CEO)
- Website: prosperity.com

The Prosperity Institute, formerly known as the Legatum Institute, is an independent company limited by guarantee, and think tank based in London, founded in 2007. Its stated mission is to promote and protect the principles that produce local and national prosperity.

The Institute is best known for publishing the annual Legatum Prosperity Index, which measures national prosperity across 167 countries using approximately 300 indicators spanning economic and social wellbeing. It also hosted the Social Metrics Commission, whose methodology for measuring poverty was adopted by the UK Department for Work and Pensions and founded the Courage in Journalism Award honouring journalists killed for their work.

The Institute has been influential in UK policy debates, particularly regarding trade policy, Brexit and developing policies to leave the ECHR, which was adopted by the Conservative Party and Reform UK shortly after publication, and its researchers have had regular access to government ministers. It is primarily funded by Legatum, founded by New Zealand businessman Christopher Chandler.

== History, operations and funding ==
=== Founding and structure ===
The Legatum Institute was founded in 2007, funded by the Dubai-based Legatum, owned by businessman and hedge fund manager Christopher Chandler. Chandler and his brother, Richard, built their fortune through a range of investments in the 1990s and 2000s, notably in Russia as well as in Hong Kong property and Japanese banking sectors.

The Institute operates as part of what Legatum describes as "a global community of organisations founded and supported by Legatum Foundation." Other organisations within this network—including the END Fund (combating neglected tropical diseases), the Freedom Fund (addressing modern slavery), the Luminos Fund (education for out-of-school children), the Resilio Fund (crisis response) and the Legatum Center at MIT—are separate entities also supported by the Foundation and are not part of the Institute itself.

In 2023, the charitable organisation Legatum Institute Foundation was succeeded by Prosperity Institute Limited, a private company fully funded by Legatum. The Institute rebranded from "Legatum Institute" to "Prosperity Institute" in January 2025.

=== Funding and transparency ===
The Institute receives the majority of its funding from Legatum. According to Financial Times reporting in 2017, £3.9 million of the Institute's £4.3 million income came from the Foundation, with additional support from over 40 donors. The Institute states that donors may remain anonymous if they wish.

In November 2022, the funding transparency advocacy group Who Funds You? rated the Institute as "E", its lowest transparency rating, noting that donors are not publicly disclosed. That rating was maintained as of the group's 2025 report.

=== Leadership ===
The Institute is located in Mayfair and is controlled by four directors, Marcus Pont, Michael Green, Rob Vickers and Christopher Alexander, all of whom are British nationals.

Philippa Stroud (formerly executive director of the Centre for Social Justice and a Conservative Party peer in the House of Lords) was appointed CEO of the Legatum Institute in 2016 and left this post in March 2023 to head up the Alliance for Responsible Citizenship. Dr Radomir Tylecote served as Managing Director from 2023 to 2026.

=== 2018 allegations and legal proceedings ===
In 2018, Bob Seely, a Conservative MP, used parliamentary privilege to allege that Christopher Chandler had links to Russian intelligence, claiming that he and other MPs had seen intelligence documents suggesting Chandler might be a counterintelligence concern. Chandler and the Institute strongly denied these accusations.

Chandler filed a defamation lawsuit in the US District Court for the District of Columbia against Donald Berlin, a private investigator alleged to be the source of the claims. In September 2023, the court ruled the allegations were "a complete fabrication". In October 2024, a federal jury awarded Chandler $8,000,001 in damages—the second-largest defamation verdict in Washington DC history.

Separately, Labour MP Chris Bryant, who had joined in making allegations in 2018, accepted in July 2022 that the allegations were disproved, making a statement in the UK High Court.

== Legatum Prosperity Index ==
The Legatum Prosperity Index is the Institute's flagship annual publication, measuring national prosperity based on both material wealth and social wellbeing factors. First published in 2007, it has expanded from covering 50 countries to 167 countries and territories.

=== Methodology ===
The Index is structured around 12 pillars: Safety and Security, Personal Freedom, Governance, Social Capital, Investment Environment, Enterprise Conditions, Market Access and Infrastructure, Economic Quality, Living Conditions, Health, Education and Natural Environment. These pillars are underpinned by 67 policy-focused elements measured by approximately 300 indicators drawn from sources including the Gallup World Poll, World Development Indicators, Freedom House and the Worldwide Governance Indicators.

The methodology was developed with input from over 100 external advisors, including academics, researchers, and policy experts from universities and other organisations worldwide. Oxford Analytica assisted in the early development of the Index.

Unlike simpler measures such as the Human Development Index (HDI), which uses four indicators, the Prosperity Index's multidimensional approach aims to capture a broader picture of national wellbeing beyond traditional economic metrics like GDP per capita.

=== Academic use ===
The Index has been used as a data source in peer-reviewed academic research. A 2021 study published in Technological Forecasting and Social Change used the Index to analyse pathways to prosperity across 142 countries, finding that education was the most critical driver of prosperity enhancement. The Index is included in the Springer Encyclopedia of Quality of Life and Well-Being Research as a reference measure.

=== Notable findings ===
The Index consistently ranks Nordic countries among the most prosperous nations. In the 2023 rankings, Denmark topped the list, followed by Sweden, Norway and Finland. South Sudan ranked last at 167th.

The Institute has noted that approximately three-quarters of the 167 countries tracked experienced declining levels of freedom of expression and access to information over the decade to 2020.

== Research and policy work ==
=== Trade policy and CPTPP ===
The Institute has a substantial record of research on trade policy, particularly following the 2016 UK referendum on EU membership. Publications included "A Blueprint for UK Trade Policy" (2017) by economist and trade lawyer Shanker Singham and others, which advocated for the UK to pursue membership of the Comprehensive and Progressive Agreement for Trans-Pacific Partnership (CPTPP).

In a 2021 parliamentary debate, Conservative MP Steve Baker credited the Legatum Institute's Special Trade Commission and specifically its 2017 paper, with originating the idea of UK CPTPP membership, stating it was "greeted with derision at the time". The UK formally applied to join CPTPP in 2021 and acceded in 2023.

Crawford Falconer, a commissioner on Legatum's Special Trade Commission and former New Zealand Ambassador to the World Trade Organization, was appointed as the UK government's Chief Trade Negotiation Adviser in 2017.

=== Social Metrics Commission ===
The Institute hosted the Social Metrics Commission, an independent body founded in 2016 to develop new approaches to poverty measurement in the UK. Chaired by Baroness Stroud, the Commission was designed to be cross-party, drawing members from different political backgrounds alongside data experts and representatives of organisations working with people in poverty.

In September 2018, the Commission published "A New Measure of Poverty in the UK", which proposed a methodology accounting for factors previously omitted from poverty statistics, including inescapable costs such as childcare, the impact of disability, access to savings, and groups such as homeless individuals and those in overcrowded housing. The report found that 14.4 million people were living in poverty in 2017, including 4.5 million children.

On 17 May 2019, the Department for Work and Pensions announced it would develop official statistics based on the Commission's methodology. The Work and Pensions Select Committee recommended the approach as the government's "official, central measure of poverty". In January 2024, the DWP published its first "Below Average Resources" statistics based on the Commission's framework, describing it as "Official Statistics in Development".

The Commission's modelling was used by Baroness Stroud and the Legatum Institute in a campaign calling for the Chancellor of the Exchequer to retain the £20 Universal Credit uplift in Autumn 2021. The Institute estimated that 840,000 people would be shielded from poverty if the cut was reversed.

=== Other policy areas ===
The Institute has advocated for regulatory reform and lower taxation, including in response to tax policy changes in the United States. It has published critiques of ESG (Environmental, Social and Governance) frameworks and DEI (Diversity, Equity and Inclusion) policies in business and finance.

Through its Sovereignty Unit, established in 2023, the Institute has advocated for national sovereignty relative to multilateral institutions and has criticised European regulatory harmonisation, including in defence policy.

Researchers have published work arguing that high levels of immigration impede social integration, with the Institute's Guy Dampier calling for more restrictive policies such as extending the qualifying period for indefinite leave to remain.

The Institute's UK-US Special Relationship Unit advocates for closer trading relationships and lower tariffs between the UK and United States.

=== European Convention on Human Rights ===
In July 2025, the Institute published Why and How to Leave the ECHR, a policy paper co-authored by senior researcher Guy Dampier and former Home Secretary Suella Braverman KC MP, proposing a phased UK withdrawal from the European Convention on Human Rights and amendments to the Belfast Good Friday Agreement. The paper was subsequently adopted as policy by both the Conservative Party and Reform UK.

=== National grooming gangs inquiry ===
Following the government's U-turn on a national statutory inquiry into grooming gangs, the Prosperity Institute ran several events examining the issue. At the 2025 Conservative Party Conference, GB News journalist Charlie Peters appeared alongside Conservative MP Katie Lam and Open Justice founder Melisa Tourt; the three argued the inquiry risked being diluted through a local truth-and-reconciliation process rather than a statutory probe with powers to compel witnesses. The Institute returned to the topic in January 2026, with a panel featuring Lam and Laila Cunningham, Reform UK's candidate for London mayor. U.S. Under Secretary of State Sarah Rogers had also spoken at the Institute in December 2025, citing grooming gang coverage as an example of what she described as European suppression of factual speech.

=== NHS polling ===
The Institute has commissioned polling examining public support for financial penalties for missed GP appointments and assessed attitudes towards NHS maternity care.

=== Energy policy ===
In January 2026, the Institute published It's Broke, Fix It, an energy policy report by senior fellow Rupert Darwall, arguing that the prioritisation of climate policy over energy security since 2007 had resulted in higher electricity costs relative to other developed nations.The report contended that between 2010 and 2024, a 20% increase in generating capacity had produced 24% less electricity, attributing this to the expansion of weather-dependent renewables. The Institute called for the abolition of the Department of Energy Security and Net Zero, a proposal endorsed by Shadow Energy Secretary Claire Coutinho.

== Current programmes ==
As of 2025, the Institute operates several research and advocacy programmes:

- British Prosperity Unit: Focuses on domestic economic policy, including regulatory reform and taxation, with the stated aim of promoting economic growth.
- Nationhood: Examines questions of national identity, community cohesion and immigration policy.
- UK-US Special Relationship Unit: Advocates for strengthened trade and diplomatic ties between the United Kingdom and United States.
- Sovereignty Unit: Established in 2023, examines the relationship between national sovereignty and multilateral institutions.
- Financial Freedoms: The Financial Freedoms programme focuses on property rights and access to financial services. The campaign was launched in October 2025, documenting cases of individuals and businesses denied access to banking services on the basis of their views or sector of operations.
- The Edington Fellowship: An annual programme offering up to twelve places for early-career professionals seeking careers in public life. Named after the Battle of Edington, at which King Alfred the Great defeated the Viking Great Heathen Army before establishing a legal code and culture of literacy rooted in Judeo-Christian values. The Fellowship combines seminars on statecraft, political philosophy and leadership development with peer mentoring, with the aim of cultivating the next generation of public servants.

== Courage in Journalism Award ==
The Institute founded the Courage in Journalism Award in 2017 following the murder of Maltese investigative journalist Daphne Caruana Galizia in October of that year. The award was created to highlight the dangers faced by journalists around the world and to support press freedom.

The award is presented posthumously to journalists whose determination to report on corruption and injustice cost them their lives. The panel of judges has included journalist Christina Lamb OBE among others.

Recipients have included:

- 2019: Ján Kuciak, a Slovak investigative journalist murdered in 2018 at age 27. His death prompted mass protests in Slovakia and contributed to the resignation of Prime Minister Robert Fico.
- 2020: Raed Fares, a Syrian journalist who ran Fresh Radio and was assassinated in Idlib.
- 2021: María Elena Ferral Hernández, a Mexican journalist murdered in March 2020 after publishing reports on political corruption and criminal activity in Veracruz.

== Role in Brexit ==
The think tank became prominent in UK policy debates following the 2016 EU membership referendum. In July 2017, the Institute formed the Special Trade Commission, headed by Shanker Singham, who had supported Remain in the referendum and including former New Zealand Ambassador and Permanent Representative to the World Trade Organization Crawford Falconer as a commissioner.

The Special Trade Commission's work was characterised by some commentators as pushing for a "hard Brexit", although the Institute stated it took no public position in the lead-up to the EU referendum and that its post-referendum role was to support implementation of the result.

According to the Financial Times, Singham met representatives of the Department for Exiting the European Union six times in the year to August 2017, including the department's permanent secretary. The Times reported that Singham held regular meetings with Brexit Secretary David Davis and International Trade Secretary Liam Fox.

=== Irish border proposals ===
In 2017, the Institute published a report examining potential solutions to the Northern Ireland border question, including the use of unmanned aerial vehicles for monitoring, the repurposing of the Special EU Programmes Body and the creation of a special economic zone—an idea also proposed by the Republic of Ireland's main opposition party at the time. The drone proposal was criticised; the report itself acknowledged challenges including cost and weather limitations. In 2025, the Institute published "Why and how to leave the ECHR", co-authored with then Conservative MP Suella Braverman KC, propsing a phased UK withdrawal from the European Convention on Human Rights. The paper recommended amending the Belfast Good Friday Agreement to remove references to the ECHR as part of the proposed withdrawal process

=== Charity Commission inquiry ===
In June 2018 the UK's Charity Commission stated that the Institute's "Brexit Inflection Report" could be seen as seeking to achieve a "particular final outcome", which would constitute political activity inconsistent with charitable status. The Commission requested the report be removed from the Institute's website.

The team responsible for the Brexit-related work, including Singham and Matthew Elliott (who had joined as a senior fellow), departed the Institute in early 2018 to join the Institute of Economic Affairs. In May 2018, the Institute announced it would end its Brexit-related research.

The Charity Commission subsequently issued an apology regarding its handling of the matter. The Institute is no longer registered as a charity.

=== Plan A+ publication ===
In 2018, while at the Institute of Economic Affairs, Singham and Radomir Tylecote (Managing Director of the Prosperity Institute between 2023-2026) co-authored "Plan A+: Creating a Prosperous Post-Brexit UK". The Daily Telegraph described the publication as having "moved the centre of gravity in the Conservative Party". Boris Johnson quoted from Plan A+ in his first speech as Prime Minister.

== Historic programmes ==
=== Public attitudes research ===
In 2015, the Institute commissioned YouGov to investigate public attitudes towards capitalism, which highlighted a nearly universal belief that the biggest corporations in the world had become successful through cheating and at the expense of the environment.

In 2017, the Institute commissioned polling firm Populus to survey British public opinion on economic and social priorities. The findings indicated that respondents' top priorities were: food and water security; emergency services; universal healthcare; housing; employment; and free compulsory education. Lower priorities included car ownership and cheap air travel.

The poll found that the British public favoured public ownership of water, electricity, gas and railway sectors; believed taxes should rise to fund the NHS; supported higher levels of regulation; favoured caps on CEO pay; supported worker representation at board level and supported abolishing zero-hour contracts. Respondents also held unfavourable views of "capitalism" as a concept, associating it with greed, selfishness and corruption.

The Institute published these findings despite their tension with its own free-market advocacy positions. Writing in The Sunday Times, Will Clothier used the poll to reflect that "capitalism has delivered for too few".

=== Centre for Entrepreneurs ===
In October 2013, the Institute co-founded the Centre for Entrepreneurs (CFE) in partnership with entrepreneur Luke Johnson. The CFE took ownership of Startup Britain in 2014 and has released research on the role universities should play in entrepreneurship and the benefits of offering entrepreneurship schemes to pre-release prisoners.

=== Other historic work ===
At the 2015 Africa Prosperity Summit, the Institute participated as a panellist during the session on "Stoking African Innovation: Ways and Means", which focused on addressing economic and social requirements.

In July 2018, the Institute released a report linking anxiety, self-harm and other mental illness with high social media use among young people, arguing that this is damaging families and young people's relationships with other adults.

== Events ==
The Institute holds regular public events. In 2012, the Dalai Lama spoke at an event called "Ethics for a More Prosperous World". In 2018, the Institute hosted gatherings bringing together thinkers from different perspectives to debate under the Chatham House Rule. In recent years the Institute has also livestreamed its events.

== See also ==
- Legatum
- Legatum Prosperity Index
- Christopher Chandler (businessman)
- Brexit
- Think tanks in the United Kingdom
- ISQOLS (Award for the Betterment of the Human Condition)
