= Rock the Casbah (disambiguation) =

"Rock the Casbah" is a song by The Clash.

Rock the Casbah or Rock the Kasbah can also refer to:

- Rock the Casbah (2012 film), a 2012 Israeli film
- Rock the Casbah (2013 film), a 2013 French-Moroccan film
- Rock the Kasbah, an annual gala fundraiser benefiting Virgin Unite and The Eve Branson Foundation
- Rock the Kasbah (film), a 2015 U.S. film starring Bill Murray

== See also ==
- Batallion 50 Rock the Hebron Casbah, a viral video
