= Legatum Prosperity Index =

Annual ranking of countries by Legatum

The Legatum Prosperity Index is an annual ranking developed by the Legatum Institute, an independent educational charity founded and part-funded by the private investment firm Legatum. The purpose of the Prosperity Index is to measure national prosperity. It considers both material wealth (traditional economic indicators) and social well-being factors. The ranking is based on a variety of factors including wealth per capita, economic growth, education, health, personal well-being, and quality of life.

The 2026 Legatum Prosperity Index indicates Switzerland, Norway, Ireland, Denmark, Finland, Iceland, Sweden, Germany, Australia, and the Netherlands are the most prosperous, while Eritrea, Niger, Chad, the Central African Republic, Burundi, Somalia, Afghanistan, South Sudan, the Democratic Republic of the Congo, and Sudan are the least prosperous.

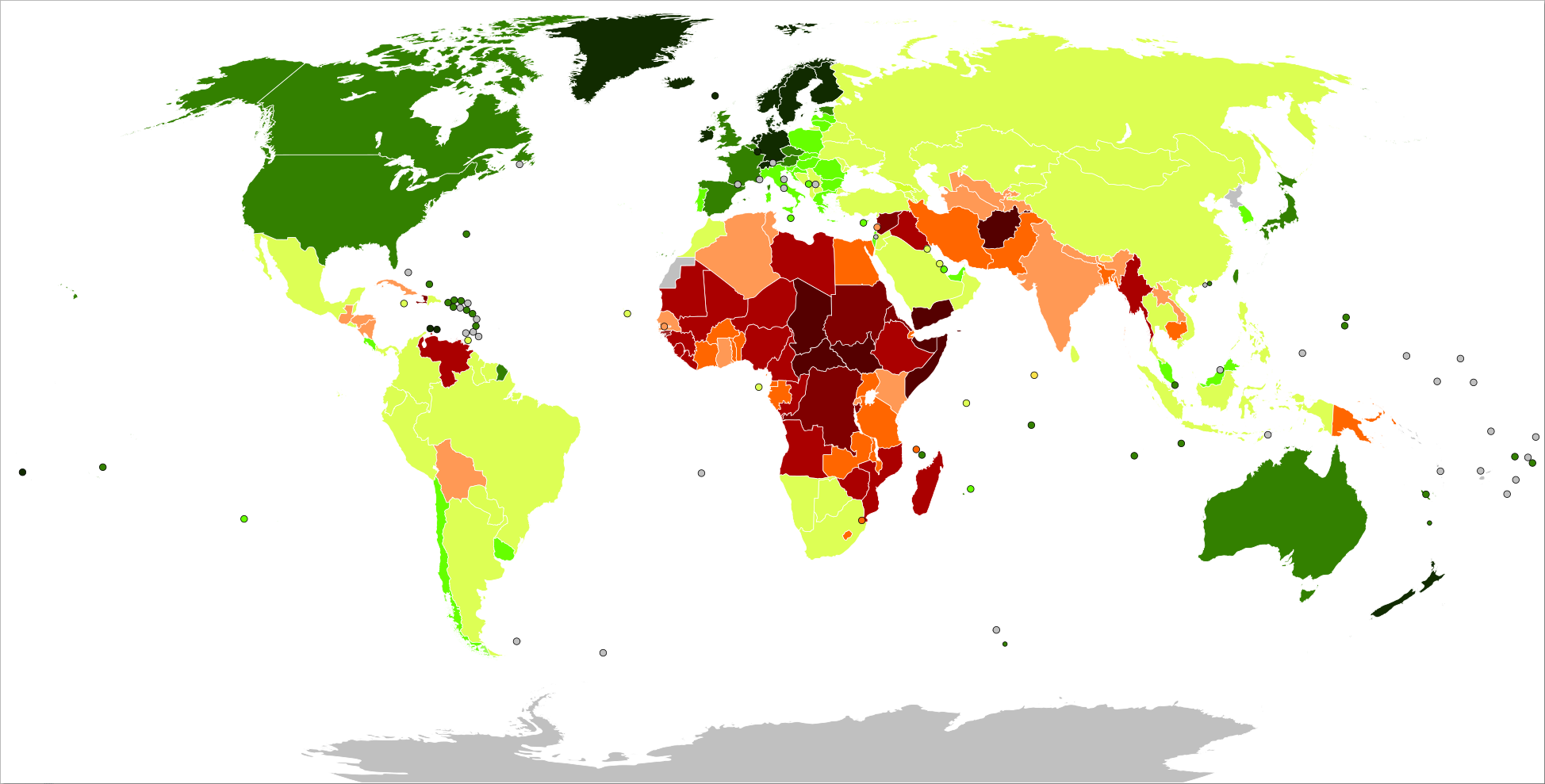
Countries according to their score (L) in the 2023 Legatum Prosperity Index: L ≥ 80 75 ≤ L < 80 65 ≤ L < 75 55 ≤ L < 65 50 ≤ L < 55 45 ≤ L < 50 40 ≤ L < 45 35 ≤ L < 40 30 ≤ L < 35 Data unavailable

== Methodology ==
The 2026 Legatum Prosperity Index is based on 130 different variables analysed across 161 nations around the world. Source data includes Gallup World Poll, World Development Indicators, International Telecommunication Union, Fragile States Index, Worldwide Governance Indicators, Freedom House, World Health Organization, World Values Survey, Amnesty International, and Centre for Systemic Peace. Oxford Analytica assisted in the early development of the Prosperity Index and has contributed to shaping the methodology. Today, the annual Index is produced and published by the Legatum Institute. The Legatum Institute operates a transparent approach to its work on the Prosperity Index. To that end, the entire methodology of the Prosperity Index along with the data used to create it is available for free online at the institute's website. The 130 variables are grouped into 3 domains and 10 pillars, which are averaged using equal weights. The 3 domains and 10 pillars are:

- Development –
  - Standard of Living
  - Health
  - Education
- Freedom
  - Civil Peace
  - Freedom of Dissent
  - Economic Freedom
- Society
  - Integrity of Families
  - Integrity of Communities
  - Integrity of Society
  - Integrity of State

== Legatum Prosperity Index ranking ==
Legatum Prosperity Index rankings as of 2026
Rank	Change	Country	Points
1	▲4	Switzerland	91.82
2	▲1	Norway	91.07
3	▲8	Ireland	90.19
4	▼3	Denmark	89.70
5	▼1	Finland	89.55
6	▲2	Iceland	89.16
7	▼5	Sweden	88.39
8	▲1	Germany	88.11
9	▲6	Australia	88.07
10	▼4	Netherlands	87.93
11	▼4	Luxembourg	87.84
12	▲6	Belgium	87.76
13	▼3	New Zealand	87.56
14	▲2	Japan	86.75
15	▼1	Austria	86.61
16	▼3	Canada	86.02
17	▲2	United States	85.52
18	▼6	United Kingdom	85.39
19	▲2	Estonia	84.67
20	▲5	Czech Republic	84.61
21	▲2	France	84.44
22	▲5	Slovenia	84.11
23	▼6	Singapore	83.83
24	▲9	Israel	83.71
25	▲7	Lithuania	83.57
26	▼2	Spain	83.25
27	▼1	Portugal	82.54
28	▲2	Italy	82.44
29	▼1	Malta	81.49
30	▲1	Latvia	81.47
31	▼2	South Korea	81.32
32	▲2	Cyprus	81.23
33	▲5	Uruguay	80.68
34	▲5	Costa Rica	78.92
35	Steady	Slovakia	78.63
36	▲1	Poland	78.55
37	▲4	Croatia	77.89
38	▲2	Greece	77.69
39	▼3	Chile	77.49
40	▲5	Romania	76.36
41	▲8	Montenegro	74.86
42	▲11	Georgia	74.41
43	▲18	Armenia	74.22
44	▲6	Panama	73.87
45	▲2	Mauritius	73.08
46	▼3	Malaysia	73.03
47	▼5	Hungary	72.38
48	Steady	Bulgaria	72.03
49	▲16	Albania	71.91
50	▲10	Kuwait	71.69
51	▼7	United Arab Emirates	71.67
52	▲3	North Macedonia	71.14
53	▲5	Argentina	71.01
54	▲13	Oman	69.98
55	New entry	Fiji	69.96
56	Steady	Trinidad and Tobago	69.77
57	▲13	Moldova	69.62
58	▼6	Serbia	69.41
59	▲7	Brazil	68.90
60	▲12	Bosnia and Herzegovina	68.75
61	▲7	Dominican Republic	68.01
62	New entry	Bhutan	67.40
63	▲25	Mongolia	67.37
64	▼1	Indonesia	66.89
65	▲26	Sri Lanka	66.68
66	▲3	Kazakhstan	66.37
67	▲19	Jordan	66.28
68	▼4	Thailand	65.72
69	▼10	Peru	65.68
70	▲13	Botswana	65.18
71	▼14	Jamaica	65.02
72	▲10	Suriname	65.00
73	▲3	Paraguay	64.75
74	▲7	Colombia	64.68
75	▲24	Tunisia	64.18
76	▲20	Morocco	64.02
77	▲13	Namibia	63.85
78	▼32	Qatar	63.45
79	▲5	Philippines	63.06
80	▼18	Bahrain	63.02
81	▼8	Vietnam	62.48
82	▲11	Belize	62.19
83	▲26	Algeria	62.08
84	New entry	Bahamas	61.41
85	▼14	Mexico	61.18
86	▼11	South Africa	61.02
87	▲7	Kyrgyzstan	60.93
88	▲10	Ghana	60.70
89	New entry	Timor-Leste	60.70
90	▲11	Guatemala	60.68
91	▲12	India	60.67
92	▲14	Bolivia	60.54
93	▲26	Gabon	60.45
94	▲6	Uzbekistan	60.27
95	▼10	Ecuador	60.16
96	▲1	El Salvador	59.76
97	▼18	Saudi Arabia	59.36
98	▲12	Nepal	59.00
99	▲13	Lebanon	58.30
100	▲2	Senegal	57.70
101	▲4	Honduras	57.61
102	▼7	Turkey	57.30
103	▼26	Russia	56.84
104	▲13	Tanzania	56.50
105	▼13	Azerbaijan	55.72
106	▲2	Kenya	55.51
107	▲9	Gambia	55.04
108	▲32	Iraq	54.29
109	▲11	Ivory Coast	53.66
110	▼56	China	53.59
111	▲16	Zambia	53.36
112	▲18	Papua New Guinea	52.32
113	▲19	Lesotho	51.68
114	▲41	Angola	51.48
115	▲31	Libya	51.12
116	▲10	Iran	51.10
117	▼6	Rwanda	50.95
118	▲5	Benin	50.68
119	▲35	Mauritania	50.58
120	▲1	Egypt	50.19
121	▲12	Togo	50.08
122	▲2	Bangladesh	49.82
123	▲16	Zimbabwe	49.24
124	▲5	Uganda	49.04
125	▲9	Pakistan	48.96
126	▼4	Djibouti	48.85
127	▲7	Eswatini	48.80
128	▼3	Malawi	48.77
129	▼16	Tajikistan	48.63
130	▼12	Cambodia	48.35
131	▲17	Congo	48.13
132	▼54	Belarus	47.80
133	▲14	Cameroon	47.02
134	▼19	Laos	46.37
135	Steady	Burkina Faso	45.44
136	▲13	Guinea-Bissau	44.91
137	▲16	Ethiopia	43.75
138	▲4	Nigeria	43.07
139	▲4	Myanmar	42.76
140	▲4	Sierra Leone	42.46
141	▼3	Liberia	42.36
142	▼5	Madagascar	41.95
143	▼29	Nicaragua	41.47
144	▲6	Mozambique	40.66
145	▼14	Equatorial Guinea	40.32
146	▼5	Guinea	40.15
147	▲19	Yemen	39.86
148	▼3	Venezuela	39.73
149	▲2	Mali	39.25
150	▼43	Turkmenistan	38.48
151	▲5	Haiti	38.47
152	▲6	Sudan	37.57
153	▲8	DR Congo	36.37
154	▲13	South Sudan	34.13
155	▲9	Afghanistan	32.38
156	▲7	Somalia	31.79
157	Steady	Burundi	31.78
158	▲7	Central African Republic	31.13
159	▲3	Chad	31.11
160	▼8	Niger	30.51
161	▼1	Eritrea	29.73

== Archive of rankings ==
=== 2023 ===
Country	Rank	Average Score	Safety & Security	Personal Freedom	Governance	Social Capital	Investment Environment	Enterprise Conditions	Market Access & Infrastructure	Economic Quality	Living Conditions	Healthcare	Education	Natural Environment
Denmark	1	84.55	92.59	94.09	89.45	82.56	82.42	79.64	78.79	76.81	95.77	81.07	87.48	73.94
Sweden	2	83.67	90.97	91.90	86.41	78.29	82.81	75.54	79.67	76.18	95.33	82.28	85.92	78.74
Norway	3	83.59	93.30	94.10	89.66	79.03	82.24	75.95	75.87	77.25	94.70	82.98	85.68	72.37
Finland	4	83.47	89.56	91.96	90.41	77.27	84.12	77.25	78.77	70.28	94.46	81.19	88.38	77.99
Switzerland	5	83.42	95.66	87.50	87.67	69.14	80.81	83.84	78.65	79.71	94.66	82.11	87.72	73.60
Netherlands	6	82.32	91.19	90.08	87.34	74.03	84.11	79.09	80.82	74.34	95.86	82.05	86.43	62.49
Luxembourg	7	81.83	96.32	89.20	86.31	66.60	78.91	80.72	80.03	76.93	94.56	81.59	78.79	71.98
Iceland	8	81.02	91.64	88.74	83.30	77.75	79.20	72.86	76.07	69.92	93.82	82.72	85.19	71.01
Germany	9	80.81	87.92	87.70	84.39	65.96	78.87	79.70	80.23	73.96	94.42	81.41	83.45	71.69
New Zealand	10	80.47	85.07	87.56	87.19	79.88	82.58	72.82	74.60	69.88	90.66	79.84	83.89	71.71
Ireland	11	80.31	90.97	88.59	81.72	67.73	80.43	75.29	74.07	77.81	92.65	80.04	85.00	69.48
United Kingdom	12	79.95	87.63	85.64	80.63	67.77	81.49	78.34	78.63	73.31	94.16	78.31	84.81	68.65
Canada	13	79.62	87.92	86.62	82.34	73.60	80.68	76.22	77.14	65.34	93.49	78.88	84.19	69.09
Austria	14	79.38	90.94	85.99	81.19	67.94	79.61	73.26	77.61	68.41	92.51	80.23	81.93	72.97
Australia	15	79.36	87.91	84.53	82.81	77.42	78.61	70.82	72.79	68.89	93.06	80.36	85.99	69.15
Japan	16	78.22	92.78	79.14	79.67	43.82	83.10	80.11	79.32	66.35	92.86	86.50	84.93	70.11
Singapore	17	78.21	92.05	48.63	79.12	64.68	83.23	78.05	85.75	80.10	93.35	86.89	91.44	55.28
Belgium	18	77.84	85.76	87.70	80.31	64.55	81.12	70.26	76.63	66.39	92.78	80.60	84.79	63.23
United States	19	77.44	72.43	78.85	75.18	73.91	79.48	82.85	80.40	72.34	90.74	73.26	83.15	66.69
Taiwan	20	77.36	92.96	79.23	77.68	60.42	78.60	79.66	71.15	73.86	90.22	83.37	84.61	56.57
Estonia	21	77.31	86.12	87.20	79.03	61.94	73.32	70.85	71.71	73.32	91.95	77.71	82.19	72.38
Hong Kong	22	76.90	89.16	53.28	72.31	57.03	84.99	83.63	81.07	78.19	91.36	81.33	85.81	64.69
France	23	76.73	82.98	79.06	77.24	60.60	79.42	73.42	76.98	65.81	92.61	80.46	81.27	70.87
Spain	24	76.03	86.87	83.65	72.48	69.27	76.13	69.93	77.68	57.91	93.81	79.66	80.98	64.02
Czech Republic	25	75.08	90.64	82.53	68.72	61.62	74.18	62.88	69.70	72.12	91.64	79.49	80.66	66.74
Portugal	26	74.64	86.03	85.78	73.19	62.92	71.81	67.94	76.33	60.63	91.85	77.44	77.64	64.09
Slovenia	27	74.54	90.05	75.80	63.66	62.69	70.91	67.28	72.28	64.87	91.23	79.88	81.80	74.09
Malta	28	74.36	89.11	81.05	70.26	68.19	67.66	68.64	70.32	72.04	92.98	80.54	78.33	53.20
South Korea	29	74.07	83.03	73.07	69.14	51.59	75.29	64.62	75.61	74.59	91.47	84.80	87.76	57.82
Italy	30	73.03	86.54	78.44	62.33	60.97	70.22	69.62	73.95	57.77	91.51	80.90	80.00	64.14
Latvia	31	72.99	85.14	81.39	68.82	55.06	67.16	64.66	69.31	65.11	87.88	74.52	81.36	75.48
Lithuania	32	72.54	86.78	79.62	72.57	47.26	69.41	66.41	69.10	65.40	88.11	74.43	81.80	69.64
Israel	33	72.25	59.60	68.54	75.40	54.44	80.18	74.02	71.54	70.96	93.50	83.10	81.63	54.09
Cyprus	34	71.82	80.32	78.31	65.69	56.86	68.14	67.60	71.10	62.65	90.17	79.23	79.14	62.69
Slovakia	35	71.15	87.27	78.60	61.93	61.15	68.66	58.14	67.92	63.32	89.47	76.74	72.75	67.84
Chile	36	70.18	70.27	76.35	66.98	59.48	68.54	65.54	73.21	63.25	87.70	76.06	73.47	61.29
Poland	37	70.15	86.74	67.09	58.03	63.27	64.73	61.93	69.73	63.63	90.01	76.31	78.63	61.76
Uruguay	38	69.69	79.43	84.87	72.82	66.76	65.19	55.77	61.59	55.53	86.04	77.98	70.64	59.61
Costa Rica	39	69.59	77.80	84.74	68.00	63.45	60.40	60.33	63.92	55.84	81.25	79.09	71.71	68.58
Greece	40	68.48	84.20	73.30	60.81	52.31	56.60	59.82	73.33	49.58	89.75	77.43	79.34	65.35
Croatia	41	68.24	84.39	75.16	56.15	52.19	60.65	52.72	72.04	60.36	88.50	75.74	73.54	67.45
Hungary	42	66.88	83.80	60.36	45.75	59.51	62.10	51.62	68.01	66.05	88.37	76.70	77.34	62.95
Malaysia	43	66.84	70.81	46.90	57.23	57.90	73.49	69.24	70.62	64.98	79.52	77.35	72.94	61.07
United Arab Emirates	44	66.69	77.15	31.27	63.51	55.16	70.06	71.89	75.34	66.79	84.88	78.38	74.72	51.11
Romania	45	66.40	83.65	73.56	57.11	49.96	63.04	54.16	66.39	62.04	82.30	73.02	70.47	61.11
Qatar	46	66.24	86.96	30.66	58.19	59.20	64.55	70.20	70.90	73.55	84.84	77.64	69.15	49.08
Mauritius	47	65.65	80.80	68.30	63.85	61.47	64.84	59.18	64.65	52.93	80.22	71.86	68.68	50.97
Bulgaria	48	65.55	74.84	68.31	53.12	54.62	60.37	59.52	65.32	62.46	83.43	74.11	72.79	57.72
Montenegro	49	65.01	80.95	68.59	55.90	59.33	56.43	64.12	63.21	54.03	83.71	68.44	71.69	53.73
Panama	50	64.32	77.66	67.24	49.81	60.37	59.24	53.52	67.08	60.09	76.36	75.10	57.63	67.80
Seychelles	51	63.65	76.03	61.62	60.46	58.97	56.79	57.68	61.62	48.05	79.59	77.44	66.43	59.19
Serbia	52	62.75	79.80	60.46	44.79	61.27	54.49	54.05	60.50	55.37	87.69	71.93	73.02	49.64
Georgia	53	62.28	69.34	65.58	56.04	52.10	61.47	58.17	63.94	51.19	76.55	70.64	72.33	50.05
China	54	62.15	67.96	21.22	48.47	62.67	57.29	64.41	69.02	68.46	85.05	83.11	70.42	47.69
North Macedonia	55	61.95	75.76	64.71	48.48	55.70	60.90	55.11	58.44	52.73	83.35	72.63	61.04	54.59
Trinidad and Tobago	56	61.91	68.93	73.22	53.33	56.27	53.50	50.86	58.42	53.22	82.25	74.13	65.96	52.85
Jamaica	57	61.39	60.01	75.12	55.50	53.68	57.93	59.59	58.43	48.02	78.19	73.83	64.13	52.20
Argentina	58	61.38	69.72	76.19	49.52	63.30	49.45	45.28	55.01	41.86	82.08	74.45	69.25	60.41
Peru	59	61.27	67.53	66.52	48.14	53.59	56.41	56.19	57.18	55.34	69.55	75.81	64.96	64.04
Kuwait	60	60.93	77.12	43.15	47.04	52.71	57.30	54.80	61.54	59.91	87.69	77.33	64.29	48.27
Armenia	61	60.92	70.48	62.56	50.00	47.95	55.21	62.34	58.50	50.35	77.05	73.48	69.19	53.92
Bahrain	62	60.92	66.54	27.75	44.73	58.78	68.59	57.75	71.92	57.09	85.99	76.24	68.65	46.95
Indonesia	63	60.88	69.86	53.59	55.24	60.62	57.14	59.26	60.81	55.98	69.55	71.13	60.93	56.40
Thailand	64	60.79	60.87	43.25	40.24	63.19	61.67	57.49	65.33	63.07	78.34	78.92	64.90	52.23
Albania	65	60.69	74.90	61.59	48.44	47.47	55.17	54.87	61.57	45.44	76.17	73.95	70.07	58.64
Brazil	66	60.07	60.14	63.15	47.12	61.83	54.58	46.85	54.45	50.58	81.37	71.68	59.71	69.35
Oman	67	59.85	81.59	33.70	47.60	53.61	59.77	59.99	66.66	54.85	78.60	75.44	62.00	44.41
Dominican Republic	68	59.85	63.77	69.45	46.32	59.32	52.85	54.19	59.39	54.33	73.40	70.64	55.55	58.98
Kazakhstan	69	59.53	69.59	39.43	44.40	51.27	55.65	53.70	53.36	63.31	82.44	72.23	78.80	50.18
Moldova	70	59.44	72.79	63.52	47.95	56.55	51.25	47.68	53.05	47.17	79.75	70.57	71.02	51.93
Mexico	71	59.30	43.54	58.33	43.89	58.18	56.86	54.10	66.84	60.17	74.22	73.09	63.93	58.40
Bosnia and Herzegovina	72	59.11	78.67	62.75	38.69	54.92	51.38	47.58	57.60	52.37	84.38	70.50	61.93	48.56
Vietnam	73	58.86	69.10	34.85	47.86	65.97	45.24	52.52	63.00	60.33	71.80	76.99	66.56	52.09
Ukraine	74	58.84	54.31	62.77	45.95	58.57	40.80	54.44	58.40	51.37	78.05	68.71	77.58	55.15
South Africa	75	58.67	52.33	73.87	57.63	60.99	61.22	57.63	59.64	52.71	68.31	59.90	52.56	47.29
Paraguay	76	58.56	73.55	61.38	43.14	62.51	49.04	47.04	54.04	50.06	76.09	70.84	52.10	62.89
Russia	77	58.50	51.57	34.38	41.05	58.79	51.09	51.15	62.96	62.86	78.50	71.38	81.87	56.42
Belarus	78	58.40	71.08	32.64	35.77	45.87	45.57	47.25	57.77	60.83	86.26	74.34	81.24	62.12
Saudi Arabia	79	58.35	66.15	20.87	47.72	51.98	59.79	62.64	64.22	57.77	77.87	75.34	67.77	48.12
Cabo Verde	80	58.34	81.78	72.66	61.12	53.31	43.88	50.68	43.98	41.07	69.14	72.75	53.96	55.78
Colombia	81	58.01	36.59	57.92	46.92	58.09	58.38	52.16	59.26	50.01	73.18	77.78	63.33	62.46
Suriname	82	57.91	73.99	69.41	47.72	53.21	41.12	47.64	53.02	44.69	78.16	60.80	56.49	68.72
Botswana	83	57.83	72.10	66.64	61.46	49.88	58.73	56.22	52.51	56.28	59.67	59.07	54.50	46.93
Philippines	84	57.53	46.23	57.20	45.69	64.66	52.43	55.29	58.16	57.79	64.56	70.06	61.55	56.67
Ecuador	85	57.42	67.60	63.66	42.88	57.09	46.58	47.06	57.33	42.97	69.69	71.80	62.24	60.18
Jordan	86	57.14	70.52	43.66	49.44	40.45	60.82	63.45	59.81	41.70	80.08	68.92	60.79	46.02
São Tomé and Príncipe	87	57.09	79.74	69.60	51.43	52.89	49.05	54.85	42.38	50.57	60.41	70.54	48.95	54.62
Mongolia	88	57.07	74.24	66.26	49.25	58.78	42.92	48.78	45.97	50.62	66.51	66.74	69.12	45.61
Guyana	89	56.93	66.51	64.68	48.58	53.18	46.18	47.82	47.04	54.77	74.54	62.47	56.87	60.54
Namibia	90	56.38	73.44	67.70	58.26	53.48	53.49	59.04	50.90	39.77	56.79	60.64	49.00	54.03
Sri Lanka	91	56.34	53.60	53.52	48.05	56.64	48.84	54.86	52.27	40.95	67.10	76.58	65.06	58.62
Azerbaijan	92	56.26	63.47	32.61	40.52	46.55	60.26	60.03	58.45	54.66	78.82	71.25	63.49	45.05
Belize	93	55.91	67.49	69.68	44.75	49.95	42.54	49.06	52.22	41.64	72.34	70.61	51.09	59.59
Kyrgyzstan	94	55.75	71.90	51.09	41.34	52.43	46.87	46.08	46.98	49.00	74.77	72.46	61.57	54.46
Turkey	95	55.50	45.70	30.22	36.89	45.02	56.61	56.71	66.38	53.04	80.96	70.70	64.77	55.47
Morocco	96	55.19	74.22	45.63	46.36	36.51	59.98	52.49	63.56	46.89	70.75	71.17	45.25	49.49
El Salvador	97	55.05	59.44	56.54	43.86	54.30	48.72	52.14	58.19	44.71	72.51	69.35	49.93	50.93
Ghana	98	54.66	69.75	68.40	54.49	50.62	47.00	59.64	45.80	39.68	58.90	63.08	45.75	52.85
Tunisia	99	54.46	59.83	56.75	50.66	38.73	48.28	49.98	52.94	43.34	78.07	72.05	56.90	45.96
Uzbekistan	100	53.80	75.89	31.22	38.63	59.86	44.59	46.53	49.66	50.63	67.27	60.75	64.78	40.27
Guatemala	101	53.73	61.03	55.19	37.71	53.56	48.48	53.47	54.83	51.69	59.96	68.33	44.76	55.76
Senegal	102	53.68	65.63	64.45	53.80	57.25	45.89	58.67	44.73	41.66	58.20	64.44	32.88	56.53
India	103	53.66	51.89	47.40	56.03	48.42	56.59	64.33	56.59	48.40	55.90	66.16	50.46	41.78
Cuba	104	53.44	65.79	28.66	36.49	62.06	42.18	34.62	48.70	40.20	76.96	79.53	70.43	55.65
Honduras	105	53.25	56.30	54.64	33.81	58.78	48.80	50.44	54.42	45.44	63.61	69.01	46.06	57.61
Bolivia	106	53.13	66.15	58.98	36.91	56.32	42.68	38.37	46.87	38.92	68.72	66.02	57.18	60.47
Turkmenistan	107	52.38	73.39	22.27	27.79	64.23	41.09	39.17	43.03	54.13	78.72	75.59	66.56	42.63
Kenya	108	52.25	47.64	55.10	47.51	57.03	56.50	56.46	47.56	45.76	49.52	65.21	48.21	50.48
Algeria	109	52.13	74.70	39.10	41.96	39.33	38.98	43.05	51.12	39.95	78.24	73.22	59.57	46.29
Nepal	110	51.57	66.64	57.17	48.49	56.38	42.17	48.61	39.16	45.33	56.11	63.87	45.68	49.22
Rwanda	111	51.56	59.14	44.11	60.04	44.17	59.79	58.63	45.40	49.48	41.62	64.60	39.13	52.57
Lebanon	112	51.38	56.41	52.89	32.90	33.69	45.48	50.05	50.88	31.89	74.77	68.65	67.08	51.90
Tajikistan	113	51.20	70.34	32.45	36.86	59.14	41.08	43.93	40.13	43.67	66.87	72.46	62.59	44.89
Nicaragua	114	50.22	63.73	39.96	28.43	56.78	40.79	41.10	49.82	42.50	64.36	72.10	45.60	57.43
Laos	115	50.18	75.55	27.51	39.40	45.50	34.58	50.25	53.74	46.61	57.21	66.38	48.89	56.59
Gambia	116	50.10	66.78	52.51	49.88	57.59	43.99	56.33	38.28	35.38	53.87	56.18	34.68	55.76
Tanzania	117	49.20	64.68	47.76	47.24	46.22	41.70	50.11	38.89	46.86	47.52	60.07	42.57	56.74
Cambodia	118	49.19	66.09	36.13	26.95	44.10	40.74	44.52	52.51	54.09	55.21	70.58	43.25	56.10
Gabon	119	48.84	64.17	48.32	35.02	50.99	35.72	40.90	39.98	43.07	66.48	56.07	50.39	55.00
Côte d'Ivoire	120	48.59	60.65	55.05	43.91	43.17	42.37	49.81	42.29	47.48	54.32	51.81	37.15	55.10
Egypt	121	48.57	48.13	24.85	34.12	36.69	50.42	57.67	57.28	39.63	71.70	67.20	51.06	44.05
Djibouti	122	48.47	68.44	38.74	40.23	43.62	47.56	49.25	46.56	44.97	58.16	60.55	39.32	44.19
Benin	123	48.22	72.55	59.08	49.29	36.84	39.08	54.65	37.75	43.38	45.17	53.50	36.85	50.47
Bangladesh	124	47.87	50.62	39.87	36.25	50.95	38.18	52.44	47.76	45.09	57.09	67.39	44.19	44.58
Malawi	125	47.83	65.96	61.61	48.38	40.12	42.41	52.04	36.06	37.65	37.18	61.01	33.93	57.58
Iran	126	47.71	55.57	17.09	31.83	48.96	39.30	32.60	50.34	38.93	76.11	74.93	63.75	43.11
Zambia	127	47.14	66.05	48.29	42.03	50.63	43.20	52.92	35.98	30.93	40.82	57.20	39.04	58.60
Comoros	128	46.93	74.80	53.40	29.30	54.53	36.43	43.31	35.86	33.14	48.06	59.60	38.22	56.54
Uganda	129	46.83	53.01	41.77	38.49	51.21	48.37	53.02	39.83	42.04	46.42	58.49	37.24	52.11
Papua New Guinea	130	46.64	62.76	64.10	40.86	53.60	35.62	44.58	35.98	41.23	34.37	52.87	35.40	58.31
Equatorial Guinea	131	46.59	67.34	30.49	28.44	53.36	41.97	40.09	39.26	47.01	58.86	50.41	42.96	58.88
Lesotho	132	45.62	66.30	59.10	45.19	47.01	38.91	43.36	38.36	39.37	45.31	41.30	45.03	38.22
Togo	133	45.52	66.66	49.86	37.23	43.10	37.55	46.41	35.43	38.80	46.01	55.09	39.99	50.07
Swaziland	134	45.36	62.03	30.56	36.05	41.87	44.89	46.25	43.16	44.79	55.76	48.43	44.52	46.07
Burkina Faso	135	45.12	47.89	63.52	45.67	49.14	38.09	45.81	33.28	41.36	40.49	58.72	22.03	55.47
Pakistan	136	45.10	42.13	42.64	39.43	48.64	48.10	50.13	41.44	40.35	58.13	60.78	35.41	34.03
Madagascar	137	44.94	59.87	58.14	39.19	50.98	37.29	45.72	36.15	38.22	30.00	54.12	33.76	55.85
Liberia	138	44.79	63.25	55.96	41.29	52.73	34.40	49.82	27.92	35.83	44.21	48.64	25.05	58.34
Zimbabwe	139	44.67	63.48	37.91	31.66	45.82	28.09	41.03	38.89	37.74	47.34	55.46	56.03	52.53
Iraq	140	44.66	26.94	38.01	35.85	44.50	39.68	41.19	47.56	44.83	73.61	64.62	45.44	33.67
Guinea	141	44.47	59.67	48.03	36.75	52.24	39.51	52.35	37.87	33.15	40.64	48.65	27.83	56.99
Nigeria	142	44.00	39.30	49.61	36.46	54.39	41.05	45.85	36.90	37.73	49.22	50.12	37.50	49.91
Myanmar	143	43.66	36.85	20.70	33.81	58.60	27.13	41.14	44.34	38.29	52.94	66.74	47.83	55.54
Sierra Leone	144	43.62	63.88	56.97	43.11	53.79	32.54	41.57	30.25	32.76	36.43	48.26	30.75	53.15
Venezuela	145	43.60	40.45	36.63	13.09	58.30	21.69	20.50	43.34	26.44	69.82	69.61	61.10	62.22
Libya	146	43.46	30.16	38.88	24.48	50.31	27.84	32.88	39.67	45.75	71.57	67.84	48.82	43.26
Cameroon	147	43.08	36.72	39.20	31.42	47.60	36.85	45.56	38.29	43.11	47.74	51.02	47.74	51.78
Congo	148	42.82	53.76	38.38	28.94	41.57	36.59	40.03	35.48	34.70	48.23	54.10	47.62	54.48
Guinea-Bissau	149	42.78	75.86	53.23	35.05	49.05	27.79	41.51	31.39	33.39	38.39	50.87	19.96	56.82
Mozambique	150	42.70	54.24	52.63	39.16	47.69	35.74	41.32	35.86	32.49	35.81	52.84	24.36	60.30
Mali	151	42.36	34.04	56.61	39.48	46.76	33.56	44.19	36.01	41.81	47.73	54.47	19.61	54.04
Niger	152	42.26	50.94	55.79	41.21	55.83	34.33	44.58	27.85	41.53	31.89	54.60	16.78	51.81
Ethiopia	153	41.87	41.62	35.17	39.86	51.61	30.21	44.77	29.50	42.52	42.06	60.91	31.56	52.69
Mauritania	154	41.23	67.65	41.00	28.42	49.28	26.14	30.51	31.68	39.67	55.90	56.74	28.27	39.50
Angola	155	40.55	61.33	41.13	35.64	39.62	25.24	32.59	34.93	41.81	44.33	49.88	29.61	50.47
Haiti	156	39.82	56.65	50.97	25.73	40.86	23.95	32.50	34.03	37.76	41.26	52.93	34.22	47.04
Burundi	157	38.20	39.61	29.00	32.78	42.95	33.00	49.76	30.81	29.98	27.78	58.16	31.06	53.54
Sudan	158	36.97	33.28	29.29	31.90	34.84	33.36	38.03	36.75	24.46	47.41	60.55	34.11	39.67
Syria	159	36.83	23.11	16.16	21.27	23.01	35.47	32.13	35.11	36.35	66.86	67.16	43.01	42.29
Eritrea	160	36.02	52.06	16.77	22.59	36.90	35.06	39.87	28.83	32.83	30.78	57.49	29.23	49.86
Democratic Republic of Congo	161	35.74	31.79	43.55	25.50	40.78	22.54	35.28	28.31	32.45	30.65	50.90	33.61	53.50
Chad	162	34.69	47.05	38.28	22.96	42.06	24.92	36.94	24.23	38.33	31.32	39.17	17.58	53.38
Somalia	163	34.39	31.91	34.32	23.80	43.50	31.16	41.79	26.75	28.23	32.07	44.38	26.32	48.46
Afghanistan	164	34.18	20.93	31.02	29.47	31.17	30.25	42.01	29.67	33.75	39.74	50.91	27.11	44.11
Central African Republic	165	32.83	35.30	36.83	28.40	36.72	26.32	40.21	25.49	40.34	19.21	31.95	18.62	54.57
Yemen	166	32.65	22.60	25.30	18.20	38.44	22.76	33.12	30.93	28.81	41.58	57.45	28.12	44.49
South Sudan	167	30.40	16.54	26.98	22.16	36.10	33.34	37.52	32.89	32.30	21.99	35.69	18.99	50.35

=== 2021 ===
Country	Rank	Average Score	Safety & Security	Personal Freedom	Governance	Social Capital	Investment Environment	Enterprise Conditions	Market Access & Infrastructure	Economic Quality	Living Conditions	Health	Education	Natural Environment
Denmark	1	83.86	92.21	92.51	90.95	77.24	80.19	80.54	81.88	74.58	94.88	80.62	88.12	72.57
Norway	2	83.50	95.75	94.09	90.89	76.66	79.97	79.00	77.89	72.99	93.81	84.02	85.65	71.25
Sweden	3	83.11	91.16	91.85	88.52	72.56	78.14	77.90	83.11	74.68	94.10	82.08	85.27	77.98
Finland	4	82.96	88.62	90.80	91.04	74.94	80.44	78.31	81.70	69.45	93.52	81.41	88.05	77.20
Switzerland	5	82.89	95.43	86.82	88.18	68.81	77.01	83.38	81.06	79.27	93.81	81.49	86.37	73.05
Netherlands	6	82.18	91.20	89.56	89.34	71.18	78.09	79.64	85.08	74.70	96.18	82.25	86.49	62.45
Luxembourg	7	81.10	94.21	88.75	87.36	64.27	74.77	79.83	81.46	77.40	93.55	81.54	78.97	71.10
New Zealand	8	80.93	86.58	86.71	88.81	74.93	79.94	77.94	77.02	70.02	90.10	79.74	85.53	73.83
Germany	9	80.57	88.19	86.64	86.75	65.54	76.57	77.96	83.32	73.61	95.16	81.12	82.62	69.32
Iceland	10	80.12	92.23	88.10	85.51	71.51	74.55	72.05	79.11	69.39	93.21	82.25	85.11	68.41
Austria	11	79.74	90.82	85.99	83.99	67.59	77.74	76.97	79.43	66.81	92.32	79.65	82.53	73.07
Ireland	12	79.63	90.29	89.08	83.40	64.53	73.77	76.62	75.99	75.43	92.11	79.55	85.50	69.34
United Kingdom	13	79.60	88.69	85.06	83.53	64.02	79.43	78.14	82.06	69.91	93.40	78.81	84.99	67.13
Singapore	14	79.05	92.18	53.39	75.30	68.15	86.43	83.19	87.96	75.39	94.22	86.12	91.27	55.01
Canada	15	78.99	88.37	88.19	85.19	67.63	74.84	77.29	77.64	61.94	92.54	78.37	87.83	68.11
Australia	16	78.76	86.53	85.43	85.60	70.03	77.51	74.00	73.71	66.74	92.95	80.19	85.69	66.76
Estonia	17	78.13	87.00	81.05	81.47	61.17	75.73	77.90	75.81	70.72	92.07	77.27	83.61	73.74
Hong Kong (China)	18	77.85	88.79	63.82	78.88	51.75	81.23	87.48	84.32	76.49	91.02	81.28	86.54	62.65
Japan	19	77.72	92.73	74.84	81.25	44.27	78.12	79.45	82.25	65.79	93.21	86.63	85.54	68.57
United States	20	77.15	72.11	81.30	78.70	67.32	76.59	81.14	83.68	70.03	90.69	73.95	83.21	67.06
Taiwan	21	76.90	93.00	78.67	78.96	57.67	76.94	78.87	75.09	70.97	89.10	83.43	84.95	55.18
France	22	76.34	82.58	79.07	80.50	55.59	75.34	74.52	80.88	64.43	91.35	80.50	81.87	69.45
Belgium	23	76.33	85.18	84.31	82.52	54.62	74.50	73.50	79.47	63.47	92.72	80.57	83.86	61.25
Spain	24	75.44	86.39	84.85	76.62	59.62	72.77	70.17	81.18	56.32	92.11	80.48	82.56	62.23
Malta	25	74.95	88.06	84.08	75.87	63.70	65.83	72.02	72.99	70.73	92.87	81.66	78.41	53.13
Slovenia	26	74.76	89.90	75.19	68.07	58.37	68.21	68.64	75.78	63.06	91.24	80.18	83.11	75.37
Czech Republic	27	74.56	90.74	79.34	71.09	55.24	71.40	63.87	75.13	71.61	90.68	78.99	80.63	66.02
Portugal	28	74.21	86.24	86.01	76.73	53.88	69.91	71.13	77.87	58.62	92.17	77.62	77.97	62.33
South Korea	29	73.52	82.60	69.73	71.69	43.98	75.72	63.40	79.24	73.81	91.26	84.06	88.34	58.43
Latvia	30	72.13	83.08	75.21	68.41	51.93	68.54	68.58	70.97	64.83	85.83	73.77	82.35	72.08
Italy	31	72.00	87.01	78.82	64.21	53.03	65.57	71.12	75.92	55.87	90.60	81.09	79.51	61.21
Israel	32	71.95	62.29	65.12	79.08	56.35	76.52	74.32	72.83	68.24	91.50	82.84	81.65	52.65
Lithuania	33	71.77	82.98	73.10	70.19	49.31	69.54	68.87	72.55	63.44	86.64	74.08	81.79	68.70
Cyprus	34	70.82	79.88	76.82	69.12	49.96	63.38	68.05	74.81	60.13	88.58	79.08	78.47	61.59
Slovakia	35	70.56	84.43	75.46	63.21	55.76	70.56	60.16	70.07	62.44	87.83	76.99	71.97	67.86
Poland	36	70.32	88.37	67.69	63.76	55.33	63.66	65.17	72.00	62.34	89.64	75.24	80.37	60.24
Uruguay	37	69.07	78.49	85.18	73.72	59.91	63.84	57.52	61.62	54.00	85.33	78.06	71.60	59.61
Chile	38	69.03	67.41	74.88	72.70	51.52	68.70	65.37	73.95	59.75	85.31	75.67	73.78	59.35
Costa Rica	39	68.66	77.15	83.06	68.65	53.01	59.95	61.91	66.31	52.88	81.11	78.39	73.43	68.13
Croatia	40	67.96	86.80	70.94	59.16	47.29	61.94	55.41	74.01	57.64	87.54	76.10	73.74	64.94
United Arab Emirates	41	67.31	77.75	36.39	60.69	59.92	70.63	75.03	77.04	64.13	83.95	77.81	73.61	50.74
Malaysia	42	67.25	71.64	46.46	58.59	61.54	71.95	71.13	71.84	64.73	78.25	76.96	74.57	59.37
Greece	43	66.97	84.48	69.68	62.44	46.79	50.90	61.98	73.63	45.47	88.42	76.81	78.23	64.82
Hungary	44	66.72	83.41	59.03	46.82	56.37	63.99	55.01	70.15	64.06	87.75	76.27	74.96	62.85
Mauritius	45	66.35	80.35	69.91	64.49	57.73	67.85	64.21	66.75	52.53	80.38	72.39	67.42	52.25
Qatar	46	66.33	88.80	35.71	52.63	61.07	63.75	75.33	72.38	64.47	84.60	77.61	69.36	50.28
Romania	47	66.09	84.15	70.26	55.61	48.91	64.68	57.62	67.41	60.27	81.56	74.73	66.92	60.94
Bulgaria	48	65.38	76.72	64.90	54.29	52.05	61.05	59.65	64.74	64.39	82.83	74.68	72.99	56.31
Montenegro	49	64.34	81.22	67.53	55.71	57.53	60.48	59.77	62.82	48.63	83.28	70.61	71.88	52.64
Seychelles	50	63.81	75.27	61.81	59.58	57.30	58.87	61.06	61.35	49.17	77.62	77.76	66.83	59.07
Panama	51	63.56	76.82	67.00	52.15	53.58	60.49	53.78	65.74	57.81	76.09	76.48	59.07	63.70
Serbia	52	62.30	80.31	61.04	46.90	52.15	58.78	52.91	62.32	52.89	84.79	73.31	72.67	49.53
Georgia	53	62.28	68.83	64.67	58.19	55.04	63.84	59.46	62.98	48.31	74.45	71.34	70.15	50.15
China	54	62.23	68.24	28.17	45.95	58.05	62.11	66.51	68.67	66.60	82.31	82.84	69.59	47.74
Armenia	55	61.93	74.18	60.54	52.90	51.47	59.87	62.10	58.91	48.44	77.65	74.47	68.98	53.67
Bahrain	56	61.31	65.76	30.34	41.16	64.66	67.89	66.36	73.28	49.16	86.30	75.36	68.60	46.85
Argentina	57	61.16	70.43	77.57	55.93	51.26	53.46	46.95	54.35	36.14	80.64	77.19	71.40	58.57
Kuwait	58	61.15	77.13	44.37	45.46	55.79	56.24	57.42	63.93	57.21	87.77	76.87	64.04	47.62
Trinidad and Tobago	59	61.04	70.03	70.19	56.49	50.15	52.29	46.49	61.33	49.10	82.43	74.12	66.01	53.83
North Macedonia	60	61.01	76.25	62.10	49.53	50.61	59.97	55.09	58.65	49.97	81.96	73.90	60.34	53.73
Peru	61	60.81	66.62	66.71	50.87	43.26	58.99	57.43	57.70	52.72	68.30	76.39	66.75	63.96
Indonesia	62	60.61	68.52	53.24	52.63	66.27	58.86	58.51	60.55	55.66	64.77	72.68	60.58	55.07
Thailand	63	60.51	60.38	45.78	41.92	60.37	60.64	56.13	67.30	64.15	75.32	79.37	63.61	51.20
Kazakhstan	64	60.41	68.09	39.63	43.51	56.62	59.70	55.54	57.57	59.50	81.81	73.81	78.61	50.50
Jamaica	65	60.35	60.64	74.41	57.28	50.55	58.91	57.57	57.17	44.34	78.86	74.87	60.19	49.45
Belarus	66	60.11	74.91	36.94	41.07	47.86	51.22	53.08	59.37	58.20	86.05	75.33	80.73	56.52
Oman	67	59.91	81.53	34.67	45.94	58.77	61.34	62.52	65.16	47.47	78.12	75.21	63.64	44.57
Brazil	68	59.57	61.25	66.96	51.80	48.44	56.18	47.83	54.91	47.95	80.42	72.02	59.27	67.83
Albania	69	59.54	73.09	59.78	47.94	44.92	52.37	56.71	60.95	41.81	73.94	73.84	70.91	58.27
Russia	70	59.31	50.99	40.38	41.42	54.01	54.38	54.96	63.09	62.57	79.45	71.64	82.78	56.07
Mexico	71	59.15	43.87	61.62	46.16	47.27	59.47	56.22	66.53	59.44	75.01	72.68	64.53	57.04
Moldova	72	58.97	69.95	57.88	45.90	56.67	52.50	52.15	57.09	46.48	78.73	72.33	68.91	49.03
Dominican Republic	73	58.70	61.66	68.71	44.76	52.78	52.59	53.38	59.82	50.06	73.62	72.14	56.29	58.59
Vietnam	74	58.69	67.71	40.10	44.33	63.94	44.92	54.55	62.96	58.06	71.84	76.48	66.64	52.71
Saudi Arabia	75	58.59	63.72	25.80	44.58	57.25	59.40	65.95	69.32	51.79	77.55	74.49	67.18	46.07
Bosnia and Herzegovina	76	58.04	78.44	60.71	39.45	51.49	52.20	40.73	56.96	48.03	84.04	70.05	65.32	49.08
Colombia	77	58.04	37.23	62.24	49.88	50.31	57.18	50.87	59.73	48.21	73.44	78.75	64.30	64.31
Ukraine	78	57.85	52.99	61.23	48.47	50.71	42.58	55.73	58.47	48.78	76.54	68.66	77.74	52.36
Paraguay	79	57.49	71.96	61.89	44.27	54.61	52.34	43.49	50.15	49.67	76.23	71.43	50.78	63.01
Cabo Verde	80	57.42	81.50	72.33	60.30	53.43	45.10	50.42	39.84	37.27	66.54	71.88	55.37	55.02
Jordan	81	57.24	69.40	43.40	48.22	47.60	61.59	63.48	57.86	40.47	80.48	72.93	56.22	45.22
Botswana	82	57.15	71.77	65.07	64.26	49.91	57.04	54.62	46.78	56.84	59.54	59.53	53.72	46.65
Ecuador	83	56.83	67.97	64.75	44.15	47.46	49.90	46.15	57.08	39.84	69.82	72.91	62.05	59.85
Philippines	84	56.75	44.00	59.90	45.55	58.40	53.96	54.15	57.84	58.07	62.33	69.66	61.26	55.83
South Africa	85	56.69	51.02	73.13	58.90	57.60	57.93	57.76	56.09	49.59	65.73	56.56	49.82	46.12
Azerbaijan	86	56.60	64.60	35.37	36.86	51.44	59.36	64.99	59.26	47.28	79.34	73.38	62.74	44.52
Mongolia	87	56.53	74.71	63.95	51.14	55.67	45.97	49.96	42.02	46.29	65.11	67.72	70.32	45.48
Sri Lanka	88	56.51	55.44	54.71	48.66	55.83	46.71	54.39	52.91	41.64	67.25	77.31	65.23	58.10
Suriname	89	56.44	75.42	66.90	46.33	53.26	36.54	45.42	51.21	43.55	75.98	63.95	52.32	66.43
Kyrgyzstan	90	56.14	72.43	53.49	41.98	53.00	48.40	49.37	44.20	44.73	75.65	73.40	61.89	55.18
Morocco	91	55.97	75.02	45.70	46.13	39.13	59.26	55.58	63.95	45.08	70.90	71.66	49.52	49.71
Namibia	92	55.87	74.66	65.82	59.79	51.44	53.11	56.14	49.32	40.25	55.98	59.94	48.87	55.07
Turkey	93	55.68	44.09	33.02	37.55	44.78	59.39	58.86	64.92	51.97	81.06	75.09	62.93	54.46
Guyana	94	55.67	67.54	62.25	49.08	51.92	46.10	47.18	43.25	48.95	73.58	62.88	57.06	58.31
Belize	95	55.07	69.06	65.77	45.31	46.45	40.68	46.34	50.88	36.31	72.99	72.43	55.56	59.03
Tunisia	96	54.95	58.90	55.44	53.96	40.31	48.31	54.07	54.92	41.43	77.15	71.39	56.49	46.97
El Salvador	97	54.90	58.56	62.38	48.70	49.24	52.01	52.81	56.82	42.50	69.91	69.69	49.24	46.97
São Tomé and Príncipe	98	54.71	78.79	67.81	50.67	51.19	39.18	48.41	41.43	48.11	56.38	70.49	48.78	55.28
Ghana	99	54.03	68.76	66.83	54.13	51.43	45.37	56.62	43.82	37.60	59.23	64.20	48.71	51.65
Uzbekistan	100	53.92	76.23	34.00	33.30	60.96	50.48	49.37	48.59	48.53	66.29	76.28	62.65	40.30
India	101	53.57	50.67	51.75	57.35	53.35	55.10	61.44	57.63	47.04	54.02	67.07	46.41	40.98
Cuba	102	53.57	65.90	33.74	35.68	59.31	47.35	33.35	47.60	41.17	74.51	79.04	70.10	55.03
Guatemala	103	53.30	60.67	56.44	37.63	52.54	51.05	49.53	55.14	49.52	59.93	68.15	44.47	54.58
Rwanda	104	52.90	58.38	44.63	55.86	53.17	64.14	65.00	46.47	48.70	40.49	65.25	40.94	51.82
Senegal	105	52.55	68.66	63.70	53.80	56.05	46.27	53.89	41.59	39.64	53.39	63.41	34.94	55.25
Bolivia	106	52.23	65.05	58.53	38.52	46.90	46.18	37.94	44.90	40.47	66.02	65.95	55.85	60.48
Algeria	107	52.19	75.23	39.56	39.64	47.04	37.95	44.44	48.77	37.83	76.62	72.47	61.87	44.89
Turkmenistan	108	52.04	71.76	26.11	24.37	66.82	45.67	38.98	41.73	51.53	78.00	74.90	62.07	42.57
Lebanon	109	51.93	54.61	51.07	37.37	31.36	47.56	54.66	50.91	31.33	77.31	69.66	66.11	51.18
Tajikistan	110	51.88	69.33	34.66	32.64	63.02	43.96	51.58	37.00	43.08	68.36	71.53	61.21	46.18
Honduras	111	51.79	55.70	54.05	34.60	53.08	50.66	47.19	49.51	43.86	62.30	68.68	45.05	56.79
Kenya	112	51.09	46.04	54.27	45.44	52.50	54.78	56.32	48.02	45.12	47.72	64.62	49.55	48.76
Nicaragua	113	50.88	62.03	49.26	29.91	50.77	45.66	42.05	46.28	40.89	65.79	72.96	46.28	58.68
Nepal	114	50.22	66.94	61.21	45.92	49.09	42.81	46.08	34.15	45.79	52.21	64.12	48.14	46.15
Laos	115	50.13	74.52	31.82	35.06	50.36	36.79	48.62	47.46	47.33	56.79	64.56	50.91	57.36
Gambia	116	50.08	69.13	53.65	49.81	57.30	46.18	52.66	34.76	34.24	53.48	56.13	37.69	55.94
Tanzania	117	49.54	63.40	47.64	45.29	53.72	45.06	49.28	38.39	47.02	47.67	60.82	39.40	56.75
Cambodia	118	49.15	66.50	39.08	24.40	53.14	41.49	41.93	48.13	51.78	53.21	71.22	44.05	54.92
Benin	119	48.58	74.48	59.73	49.99	42.85	38.68	54.77	35.60	39.58	43.34	56.65	37.31	49.97
Côte d'Ivoire	120	48.52	58.11	54.18	44.01	45.73	44.87	50.32	41.79	47.32	50.92	53.47	37.52	54.03
Egypt	121	48.44	43.56	26.61	32.90	44.68	48.12	56.05	56.26	38.46	71.49	67.18	51.84	44.12
Djibouti	122	48.18	68.55	38.98	38.32	46.77	46.36	50.87	43.63	47.75	54.04	62.44	36.34	44.09
Iran	123	48.05	54.94	21.84	30.85	51.62	39.80	35.22	46.87	37.59	76.57	74.75	63.85	42.68
Zambia	124	47.95	66.36	48.79	43.27	51.73	46.19	51.58	35.09	29.40	43.28	59.82	40.70	59.23
Gabon	125	47.50	64.77	47.06	37.11	42.23	32.33	38.64	34.93	41.22	64.14	56.83	54.71	55.99
Bangladesh	126	47.32	49.88	43.05	34.10	51.85	37.41	48.88	42.98	44.23	57.96	68.98	44.40	44.08
Uganda	127	46.78	54.48	44.85	38.47	48.64	52.00	51.29	37.47	41.37	44.85	58.17	39.02	50.77
Papua New Guinea	128	46.74	62.26	61.81	39.67	52.32	44.63	48.23	34.21	39.81	32.30	54.22	34.81	56.59
Malawi	129	46.60	63.88	57.21	47.44	39.97	45.97	48.89	34.31	37.78	36.14	60.54	30.62	56.41
Comoros	130	46.54	75.02	55.07	29.49	48.70	33.01	46.02	35.28	36.42	47.17	59.75	36.65	55.89
Swaziland	131	46.32	67.98	35.11	34.66	44.13	45.25	44.47	41.48	42.46	53.88	48.95	49.22	48.19
Equatorial Guinea	132	46.29	66.98	33.42	26.63	55.20	36.50	35.17	37.16	48.40	60.40	50.48	44.83	60.28
Myanmar	133	45.62	36.14	43.97	37.81	57.05	25.51	41.12	35.93	45.12	51.12	67.72	49.07	56.90
Burkina Faso	134	45.15	48.66	63.16	44.08	51.49	39.39	45.68	27.78	40.99	37.95	59.06	28.63	54.95
Lesotho	135	44.80	64.82	58.48	43.70	46.06	38.29	41.86	35.11	39.01	46.14	40.66	44.62	38.86
Madagascar	136	44.50	60.11	56.16	38.27	51.10	39.67	44.63	29.98	38.69	30.72	55.50	33.29	55.92
Togo	137	44.37	64.52	52.54	35.17	38.76	39.22	46.45	31.46	36.44	42.88	54.86	40.76	49.40
Pakistan	138	44.13	41.92	42.48	38.00	46.66	45.32	48.59	42.66	37.68	57.89	59.55	35.18	33.67
Liberia	139	44.11	63.36	54.12	42.22	53.17	36.94	46.58	23.67	36.17	41.43	49.08	24.77	57.86
Guinea	140	43.92	59.83	48.08	38.24	49.22	43.08	55.19	30.59	32.04	37.99	50.42	26.64	55.77
Iraq	141	43.85	25.77	38.62	33.95	44.64	37.18	45.91	43.80	38.08	70.59	65.51	46.12	36.07
Zimbabwe	142	43.62	61.41	39.35	30.43	45.62	36.84	36.63	34.66	35.83	46.15	54.80	52.28	49.41
Nigeria	143	43.02	38.56	51.88	36.40	50.10	45.23	46.52	32.89	33.59	46.14	49.12	35.68	50.17
Sierra Leone	144	42.93	63.96	57.15	41.50	53.44	32.90	41.40	22.13	32.64	36.10	48.41	31.98	53.53
Ethiopia	145	42.76	46.91	42.32	39.20	52.47	34.14	41.53	30.93	42.48	41.40	59.81	30.62	51.26
Mozambique	146	42.67	59.07	54.55	38.53	49.96	37.59	38.14	33.09	28.35	34.11	53.13	26.79	58.77
Venezuela	147	42.62	41.40	40.63	12.41	44.20	27.89	19.88	38.96	27.48	68.82	70.48	61.67	57.61
Niger	148	42.07	48.63	56.25	39.22	56.37	38.94	45.85	22.84	38.89	32.46	54.11	19.69	51.56
Cameroon	149	41.83	35.08	40.12	29.28	48.77	35.64	42.94	34.66	42.68	46.15	50.71	43.79	52.19
Guinea-Bissau	150	41.75	78.70	52.68	33.35	49.20	29.60	36.40	27.51	33.33	31.08	51.24	23.73	54.13
Mali	151	41.57	34.71	56.09	40.52	43.25	36.67	43.78	29.47	39.36	43.72	54.43	24.89	52.00
Congo	152	41.05	52.72	42.72	26.30	41.90	32.76	34.30	30.98	31.43	46.49	54.82	43.47	54.65
Mauritania	153	40.90	66.15	39.17	27.98	50.97	30.32	34.99	26.20	36.97	52.28	58.01	28.06	39.74
Libya	154	40.90	28.70	40.46	22.98	47.01	22.51	25.03	36.81	37.87	70.32	67.45	50.29	41.37
Haiti	155	39.65	59.59	51.70	24.82	39.68	28.51	24.86	27.40	36.52	41.66	52.66	42.33	46.03
Angola	156	39.13	61.39	40.18	33.81	44.11	22.79	33.34	31.62	31.44	42.35	50.29	27.70	50.50
Burundi	157	38.47	39.74	32.04	28.56	45.12	35.50	49.28	27.88	28.57	29.17	57.84	34.17	53.81
Syria	158	37.09	24.48	20.04	18.96	22.64	34.90	29.86	35.21	40.38	67.28	67.10	42.38	41.85
Sudan	159	36.98	32.06	31.67	22.59	43.66	36.85	41.41	31.08	22.68	47.16	60.93	32.92	40.78
Democratic Republic of Congo	160	35.11	32.60	42.72	23.32	40.06	25.41	34.28	23.07	32.47	32.81	48.65	32.44	53.44
Somalia	161	35.07	34.36	36.47	19.67	46.94	33.15	33.32	28.55	25.48	35.56	43.26	36.25	47.78
Eritrea	162	34.64	52.54	19.29	19.32	38.65	30.55	33.89	22.84	32.05	30.09	57.50	28.16	50.80
Afghanistan	163	33.71	19.71	41.21	31.18	22.32	30.07	42.91	25.37	33.79	38.92	50.98	27.58	40.48
Chad	164	33.46	48.87	39.86	20.96	39.56	27.65	32.06	18.79	34.97	27.71	37.70	19.56	53.87
Yemen	165	33.33	26.48	22.95	17.41	41.20	27.49	34.39	28.35	26.05	44.57	57.02	28.72	45.34
Central African Republic	166	32.19	38.32	36.74	26.60	38.50	27.23	33.21	18.27	40.17	21.12	32.81	19.46	53.89
South Sudan	167	28.70	16.00	26.77	17.77	36.17	31.43	37.72	22.11	32.18	22.93	35.54	15.30	50.45

=== 2020 ===
Country	Rank	Average Score	Safety & Security	Personal Freedom	Governance	Social Capital	Investment Environment	Enterprise Conditions	Market Access & Infrastructure	Economic Quality	Living Conditions	Health	Education	Natural Environment
Denmark	1	84.37	91.88	93.38	89.78	79.08	80.33	82.08	80.95	75.73	97.07	83.53	88.09	70.51
Norway	2	83.81	95.68	93.86	90.53	77.59	81.24	80.43	75.64	75.37	95.35	83.52	86.33	70.23
Switzerland	3	83.35	95.83	85.41	88.07	71.09	77.31	84.65	80.07	80.67	96.12	83.86	85.21	71.91
Sweden	4	83.15	90.23	90.02	88.21	72.51	79.05	78.68	81.60	75.80	96.55	83.02	84.49	77.61
Finland	5	83.05	90.00	89.09	90.65	75.61	80.37	79.54	80.78	69.86	95.30	81.71	86.99	76.75
Netherlands	6	82.04	90.52	88.99	88.86	71.65	78.56	80.94	84.06	75.93	96.59	82.45	86.33	59.58
New Zealand	7	81.08	87.41	86.56	88.28	74.74	80.60	78.69	76.32	68.65	91.21	81.62	84.62	74.26
Germany	8	81.07	87.83	86.42	85.66	67.24	77.06	82.26	81.83	77.09	96.18	82.05	81.85	67.38
Luxembourg	9	81.02	94.29	88.26	86.80	60.89	74.90	81.59	80.45	77.88	95.87	83.04	79.21	69.03
Austria	10	80.43	93.14	84.20	82.56	69.66	78.47	77.20	78.21	71.33	94.56	81.21	82.33	72.29
Iceland	11	80.21	93.03	86.58	83.56	75.22	75.25	73.10	76.59	70.77	92.71	83.72	84.68	67.28
Ireland	12	80.18	90.71	87.83	83.00	67.24	73.84	79.66	75.02	75.83	94.31	81.63	84.80	68.24
United Kingdom	13	80.07	88.37	82.97	83.16	67.55	79.60	79.76	81.10	72.64	95.04	81.33	84.05	65.21
Canada	14	79.82	88.49	88.22	84.07	69.37	75.86	78.51	76.89	68.04	93.62	79.61	86.78	68.38
Singapore	15	79.51	92.52	51.84	75.21	65.99	87.00	85.14	88.17	80.00	96.00	86.39	91.42	54.47
Australia	16	78.60	88.80	83.92	84.21	65.36	78.08	74.99	73.89	66.46	93.36	81.90	85.24	66.97
Hong Kong	17	78.36	93.00	63.28	79.06	52.68	81.23	86.86	83.62	73.69	93.48	82.80	87.21	63.44
United States	18	77.46	73.09	79.60	77.76	67.01	78.50	82.37	82.76	72.59	91.07	75.28	82.73	66.77
Japan	19	77.27	92.77	71.27	80.09	44.86	77.94	80.45	79.53	67.73	93.35	86.29	85.59	67.40
Taiwan	20	77.15	92.75	74.65	78.87	57.23	77.71	80.48	77.22	73.56	91.27	81.94	85.40	54.73
Estonia	21	76.89	86.10	75.74	80.31	58.13	76.14	77.32	75.49	73.41	91.05	76.04	83.32	69.64
France	22	76.55	81.67	77.82	77.97	58.21	76.15	75.27	79.49	67.46	93.89	81.81	81.01	67.83
Belgium	23	76.13	85.68	83.23	80.13	51.84	75.16	75.45	78.40	67.18	93.07	81.41	83.78	58.28
Spain	24	75.84	86.21	84.16	73.10	61.08	73.14	73.21	79.95	60.31	93.97	82.82	82.02	60.06
Malta	25	75.48	90.07	81.81	76.08	63.53	66.14	73.63	72.99	73.56	94.54	82.45	79.47	51.47
Slovenia	26	74.56	89.14	72.96	66.96	59.08	67.39	68.52	75.02	66.68	91.74	80.51	82.24	74.52
Portugal	27	74.07	87.40	85.21	72.94	54.09	70.43	72.45	77.33	60.04	91.18	80.27	77.62	59.95
South Korea	28	73.44	82.98	65.31	70.11	44.97	76.56	67.44	78.07	74.79	91.66	84.29	89.06	56.02
Czech Republic	29	73.12	90.75	71.35	70.23	47.42	71.39	63.23	74.21	73.89	89.58	80.23	80.71	64.50
Israel	30	71.98	61.40	62.89	77.02	60.74	77.27	74.35	72.37	69.01	93.58	82.40	82.23	50.45
Italy	31	71.83	87.83	76.13	61.20	53.24	65.38	71.74	75.87	57.86	90.97	82.92	79.39	59.47
Latvia	32	71.01	82.55	68.83	66.37	48.56	68.44	69.34	70.79	65.88	87.14	72.03	81.35	70.80
Cyprus	33	70.32	80.70	74.14	67.49	50.65	63.91	68.30	73.48	57.57	89.43	79.66	79.76	58.71
Lithuania	34	70.24	84.78	66.88	67.70	40.39	70.23	68.01	71.39	65.20	88.02	71.63	82.09	66.51
Slovakia	35	69.63	85.39	69.04	61.68	51.57	70.24	59.22	66.57	65.41	88.87	77.07	72.26	68.15
Poland	36	69.14	86.74	61.41	61.10	48.99	64.93	64.24	71.30	63.98	89.91	77.63	79.89	59.55
Chile	37	68.39	73.03	70.30	69.54	49.71	68.16	65.42	72.95	58.56	84.73	74.73	73.94	59.63
Costa Rica	38	68.34	77.12	79.78	65.47	54.60	60.79	62.55	65.25	52.93	82.04	79.28	73.60	66.66
Uruguay	39	68.24	78.97	83.38	69.57	53.96	64.93	56.94	61.18	52.47	85.60	80.02	72.08	59.79
Malaysia	40	67.49	71.07	43.62	57.76	62.44	72.71	72.59	70.31	67.75	79.69	78.12	74.57	59.26
Greece	41	67.32	87.46	64.89	59.89	51.22	52.35	64.37	73.28	46.77	87.76	78.72	77.65	63.54
United Arab Emirates	42	67.11	77.60	31.18	60.20	60.21	70.75	76.22	76.68	64.19	85.78	77.55	73.51	51.44
Croatia	43	66.61	86.29	62.26	57.28	44.44	61.48	54.07	73.40	59.18	87.71	75.50	73.82	63.89
Mauritius	44	66.58	80.91	68.43	65.29	58.71	68.64	64.26	64.58	54.43	81.89	74.26	66.80	50.76
Qatar	45	66.46	88.73	31.96	53.52	61.04	62.68	74.48	71.91	69.20	86.20	77.40	69.13	51.20
Hungary	46	66.13	81.90	54.14	47.08	54.08	63.77	54.42	69.41	66.47	87.90	76.54	74.89	62.91
Romania	47	64.92	82.14	63.17	54.63	46.49	65.03	56.68	67.33	60.73	81.00	74.19	67.58	60.04
Bulgaria	48	64.40	75.19	59.25	53.78	49.25	60.84	58.79	64.25	63.58	84.19	74.20	74.07	55.40
Panama	49	63.89	77.05	65.49	52.47	53.17	60.35	55.13	65.46	60.24	76.49	77.56	59.34	63.95
Montenegro	50	63.68	79.35	61.00	54.92	53.30	61.11	58.63	61.06	52.36	83.64	71.46	72.38	54.92
Seychelles	51	63.40	75.07	58.23	55.88	57.14	59.03	61.34	59.04	56.59	78.42	78.72	65.20	56.14
Serbia	52	62.47	84.04	57.29	46.51	51.39	58.15	52.72	61.25	53.20	84.25	73.48	74.29	53.09
Georgia	53	61.82	71.43	59.68	56.01	49.25	65.34	60.24	63.49	49.17	72.78	72.76	71.16	50.48
China	54	61.49	68.16	21.23	44.95	57.60	62.51	65.77	67.16	68.77	81.19	82.85	70.55	47.17
Armenia	55	61.41	73.64	56.91	49.91	52.24	61.88	61.71	57.24	46.57	77.17	74.92	70.24	54.44
Bahrain	56	61.31	64.30	25.90	42.65	64.38	67.61	66.43	69.59	54.65	87.44	76.00	68.40	48.37
Indonesia	57	61.10	69.22	49.71	53.77	73.82	59.83	58.45	58.68	55.87	66.68	70.19	60.56	56.47
Kuwait	58	61.02	73.33	41.01	44.00	59.28	56.16	57.02	63.03	61.08	88.66	75.89	63.62	49.12
North Macedonia	59	61.01	74.43	55.17	51.73	48.08	60.75	56.26	59.47	49.41	83.70	74.96	61.48	56.74
Trinidad and Tobago	60	60.70	68.72	67.78	52.58	51.32	52.43	47.99	61.32	53.49	82.58	73.71	65.80	50.72
Peru	61	60.67	67.79	62.97	49.34	43.20	58.84	56.87	57.82	54.18	68.79	75.94	67.39	64.86
Kazakhstan	62	60.57	68.79	34.75	46.11	60.88	60.65	55.14	57.16	57.15	82.48	73.90	78.28	51.61
Argentina	63	60.49	69.14	74.24	54.18	48.08	53.71	46.64	53.76	37.50	80.32	77.05	72.44	58.79
Thailand	64	60.41	58.44	40.52	43.33	63.18	61.09	56.28	64.51	66.13	77.77	79.18	64.28	50.23
Jamaica	65	59.94	59.53	70.90	55.05	49.50	58.94	58.41	57.80	43.69	79.56	76.21	62.87	46.80
Oman	66	59.68	81.06	28.35	44.86	59.67	60.14	61.80	66.71	49.34	80.03	75.25	63.48	45.53
Albania	67	59.57	72.54	55.60	49.16	43.93	55.24	54.78	61.92	43.63	75.36	73.38	71.17	58.18
Mexico	68	59.53	43.80	59.15	45.34	50.10	59.07	57.04	66.94	61.71	74.36	75.81	65.14	55.86
Belarus	69	59.33	72.91	34.49	39.76	48.22	51.63	53.04	58.13	57.74	86.60	73.25	80.73	55.52
Brazil	70	59.31	61.65	63.13	49.62	48.42	56.95	47.74	53.56	46.50	80.76	74.84	60.07	68.46
Saudi Arabia	71	59.01	63.34	20.82	44.67	57.44	58.98	66.10	68.11	57.25	81.21	74.33	67.77	48.13
Dominican Republic	72	58.70	60.92	63.62	45.25	53.31	54.00	52.66	59.76	52.03	73.88	73.77	56.53	58.74
Vietnam	73	58.28	66.26	34.12	42.72	67.40	46.01	55.30	61.89	57.00	72.87	76.43	66.07	53.24
Colombia	74	58.19	37.76	58.04	48.49	50.05	58.04	52.89	59.73	50.65	75.01	78.91	64.17	64.56
Cabo Verde	75	58.17	80.46	69.75	58.75	53.77	45.39	52.46	41.69	41.78	67.78	72.30	55.79	58.12
Russia	76	58.04	50.80	32.21	43.12	50.23	54.64	53.80	61.84	60.52	81.58	69.31	82.70	55.71
Bosnia and Herzegovina	77	58.00	77.98	53.15	40.95	52.12	53.25	39.85	56.82	49.61	84.48	71.52	65.20	51.06
Azerbaijan	78	57.69	67.82	29.54	41.30	53.16	61.79	66.05	57.47	48.56	79.08	75.48	64.44	47.59
Paraguay	79	57.47	71.67	56.54	44.56	53.27	53.22	44.33	50.71	50.13	76.96	72.32	51.30	64.61
Moldova	80	57.13	70.41	51.48	46.29	47.71	54.08	50.90	57.94	44.07	76.26	69.78	69.41	47.20
Suriname	81	57.11	74.67	62.82	43.19	53.51	36.39	48.75	54.09	45.56	76.74	67.86	53.31	68.37
Botswana	82	57.09	69.30	60.63	59.64	50.00	57.63	54.95	47.08	58.36	62.68	62.47	53.78	48.61
Philippines	83	56.90	43.12	56.44	46.70	60.36	54.18	54.97	57.83	60.26	62.13	68.73	62.26	55.83
Sri Lanka	84	56.88	55.25	54.38	47.14	59.97	47.14	57.42	51.51	42.74	65.76	76.61	67.08	57.58
Mongolia	85	56.73	73.82	59.15	51.82	54.20	47.72	50.41	41.36	45.39	66.45	69.33	70.70	50.46
Jordan	86	56.59	67.87	38.42	48.29	49.52	61.31	62.51	57.60	39.56	80.36	73.00	56.42	44.21
South Africa	87	56.43	52.11	68.27	57.19	53.49	58.45	57.85	56.32	51.13	65.83	59.58	51.12	45.84
Namibia	88	56.16	74.76	63.00	58.87	51.46	53.71	56.27	50.86	42.87	57.17	60.90	47.67	56.40
Ecuador	89	56.12	69.08	57.97	41.38	45.20	49.57	46.11	54.73	39.91	71.39	74.22	64.22	59.63
Kyrgyzstan	90	55.99	72.24	48.88	43.46	53.20	50.34	48.18	43.49	46.00	72.73	73.39	63.25	56.75
Guyana	91	55.87	67.23	59.61	47.50	52.05	49.23	48.88	46.77	42.92	74.68	64.07	58.95	58.56
Ukraine	92	55.73	46.86	53.51	47.96	43.91	44.51	55.46	57.59	46.20	78.46	65.41	77.79	51.15
El Salvador	93	54.99	57.82	58.87	47.50	50.84	52.22	52.67	57.04	46.45	71.17	70.75	50.78	43.79
Turkey	94	54.94	43.69	26.51	38.90	44.63	60.77	58.27	64.38	51.01	83.35	74.13	60.55	53.11
Belize	95	54.92	68.81	61.14	44.26	45.74	40.43	47.04	51.43	40.83	73.40	71.37	55.65	58.91
Morocco	96	54.86	72.97	39.44	44.88	37.48	59.00	57.78	62.80	45.31	71.03	68.51	49.81	49.38
Uzbekistan	97	54.37	76.56	30.35	34.40	65.08	51.99	47.04	46.43	49.53	69.40	77.52	62.25	41.84
São Tomé and Príncipe	98	54.18	78.75	64.90	47.05	50.57	39.20	48.83	44.14	45.09	57.72	68.38	49.67	55.82
Tunisia	99	54.06	59.27	50.62	51.62	37.54	49.82	51.09	53.60	43.83	76.69	70.72	57.24	46.68
Ghana	100	53.81	66.31	62.39	53.55	52.65	44.79	56.51	43.00	39.14	59.35	63.60	51.51	52.93
India	101	53.64	51.84	47.59	57.11	51.90	56.74	62.55	55.40	50.32	54.00	66.27	48.74	41.21
Guatemala	102	53.58	60.67	52.51	39.07	51.50	50.97	51.96	55.96	49.86	60.43	69.41	46.26	54.36
Cuba	103	53.32	65.91	27.96	32.92	59.26	44.42	33.79	45.64	45.37	76.01	80.27	74.82	53.44
Rwanda	104	53.25	59.56	41.70	56.22	53.27	65.99	63.62	47.81	49.37	41.08	67.13	42.45	50.82
Lebanon	105	53.00	52.18	43.56	38.70	41.45	48.19	53.31	52.78	34.73	81.85	71.29	67.80	50.12
Bolivia	106	52.28	68.26	53.82	36.82	42.88	45.78	37.83	44.11	40.62	68.41	67.59	57.79	63.41
Honduras	107	52.21	56.54	49.23	35.55	52.70	50.38	48.60	50.89	45.96	63.05	71.43	46.61	55.63
Algeria	108	51.87	75.84	32.89	39.40	47.18	38.76	45.03	47.06	38.75	78.21	72.58	62.80	43.93
Turkmenistan	109	51.64	73.50	20.79	25.97	67.29	43.53	38.34	40.24	50.83	77.08	75.37	62.44	44.29
Senegal	110	51.56	63.02	60.49	52.05	56.29	46.09	54.07	42.04	40.41	54.73	61.31	32.72	55.50
Nicaragua	111	51.38	63.01	41.91	32.31	53.08	46.76	41.68	49.53	41.78	65.92	73.31	48.20	59.06
Tajikistan	112	51.26	68.53	28.14	32.86	62.60	44.95	49.98	37.50	39.02	68.43	74.05	60.48	48.62
Kenya	113	50.99	44.99	51.70	45.72	55.96	55.44	57.07	44.48	43.02	48.35	66.56	51.20	47.38
Nepal	114	50.45	68.51	57.92	45.09	50.50	43.14	47.28	35.54	46.99	51.08	65.00	48.38	45.97
Laos	115	49.92	75.27	26.51	35.31	50.84	38.38	48.60	46.63	46.91	55.05	64.50	52.41	58.64
Gambia	116	49.66	67.09	50.90	46.20	58.65	47.99	53.92	35.34	32.02	53.93	54.84	37.77	57.29
Tanzania	117	48.57	64.47	44.37	43.53	49.86	44.98	48.55	38.16	42.67	47.39	61.17	42.05	55.70
Cambodia	118	48.55	65.29	35.97	26.22	52.18	42.45	39.97	48.14	52.03	50.81	70.46	43.89	55.19
Djibouti	119	48.16	68.52	33.07	37.11	49.45	48.14	52.20	45.90	49.74	53.45	64.23	34.68	41.40
Iran	120	48.12	55.17	17.06	32.91	51.80	39.72	36.16	46.14	41.19	77.00	72.94	64.04	43.33
Egypt	121	47.98	43.68	20.87	31.71	48.06	47.15	54.47	53.96	39.83	72.57	67.51	53.76	42.23
Gabon	122	47.92	61.26	43.71	37.51	45.67	35.17	41.29	37.25	39.41	65.81	58.67	51.71	57.61
Zambia	123	47.51	66.72	41.47	43.04	49.46	47.31	52.09	33.87	31.72	41.56	60.20	41.95	60.71
Côte d'Ivoire	124	47.31	58.92	51.77	42.93	46.88	45.17	49.13	40.67	44.40	49.27	49.91	33.02	55.65
Bangladesh	125	46.91	48.97	40.69	35.01	53.62	37.47	49.40	40.46	43.96	56.70	66.85	45.40	44.46
Benin	126	46.82	73.97	57.52	45.50	39.46	38.14	55.74	34.94	37.98	41.85	53.20	33.93	49.60
Myanmar	127	46.78	37.43	37.34	35.77	57.17	32.99	52.06	38.62	43.16	50.25	67.91	50.74	57.90
Comoros	128	46.33	74.90	52.24	28.76	48.96	35.79	46.60	34.49	34.77	51.54	60.08	33.95	53.84
Papua New Guinea	129	46.07	61.95	59.72	41.49	46.87	45.06	48.27	36.16	37.85	33.08	53.96	32.73	55.63
Lesotho	130	46.06	66.12	55.67	41.36	46.66	40.02	42.56	37.37	47.05	47.27	43.56	45.60	39.50
Equatorial Guinea	131	45.77	66.32	27.97	27.71	56.71	38.60	36.34	37.90	44.90	61.46	47.43	43.03	60.89
Malawi	132	45.74	63.18	53.06	45.30	39.73	45.62	49.01	32.02	34.13	38.74	60.56	32.60	54.95
Uganda	133	45.67	53.51	38.99	38.37	48.00	52.72	52.27	37.16	40.44	43.70	56.63	36.74	49.52
Swaziland	134	45.66	66.22	31.64	32.62	43.99	45.93	44.25	38.99	42.86	53.89	52.95	44.90	49.65
Burkina Faso	135	44.82	53.13	58.61	42.47	50.16	39.21	46.42	29.65	39.52	41.17	57.61	26.91	53.04
Madagascar	136	44.81	61.12	53.73	38.39	51.54	41.14	45.49	31.77	37.47	30.25	56.71	35.26	54.89
Iraq	137	44.56	26.17	35.49	32.42	49.50	36.66	47.75	42.79	40.76	72.12	63.63	47.62	39.77
Pakistan	138	44.25	41.09	36.43	38.64	50.51	45.54	51.77	42.57	36.23	55.46	60.61	37.03	35.14
Guinea	139	44.03	60.81	47.65	37.10	51.12	44.00	54.43	30.23	35.20	40.19	47.17	23.95	56.54
Togo	140	44.03	64.77	46.39	35.74	38.42	40.60	46.98	31.24	41.03	45.27	52.00	38.34	47.55
Liberia	141	44.02	65.64	50.66	41.25	53.22	38.25	47.96	26.69	33.28	42.35	48.05	23.93	56.96
Mozambique	142	42.98	60.67	51.92	37.41	50.54	37.13	41.08	30.53	28.26	39.22	54.80	26.75	57.51
Zimbabwe	143	42.98	63.49	33.09	30.81	47.10	36.71	35.80	33.45	34.80	46.03	57.18	49.95	47.33
Nigeria	144	42.92	42.42	47.72	37.08	50.62	46.24	48.17	33.83	31.65	46.12	44.88	37.49	48.83
Sierra Leone	145	42.57	62.61	53.99	39.34	53.13	35.15	42.22	26.77	30.60	37.15	45.14	30.39	54.29
Venezuela	146	42.09	42.97	35.95	12.63	44.21	28.76	19.70	35.74	27.30	69.42	70.25	60.79	57.30
Guinea-Bissau	147	42.05	78.37	49.33	32.41	48.89	30.95	38.65	28.83	34.01	35.46	49.90	22.07	55.77
Mali	148	41.90	36.30	53.46	40.59	47.41	36.58	44.53	30.36	40.26	46.65	52.25	23.14	51.28
Libya	149	41.87	27.53	34.27	20.71	50.38	26.79	30.55	37.79	43.48	70.80	68.42	50.39	41.33
Ethiopia	150	41.81	52.12	33.73	37.43	49.03	35.51	42.07	28.95	41.31	41.24	59.47	31.56	49.23
Cameroon	151	41.45	35.61	35.62	29.88	48.49	36.80	43.43	34.02	40.11	50.16	48.99	41.60	52.66
Congo	152	41.21	54.70	38.05	27.57	43.24	35.86	35.19	30.36	33.26	45.35	54.97	40.22	55.80
Niger	153	41.20	49.08	51.48	38.11	55.55	40.57	44.75	25.02	37.02	33.07	53.15	17.47	49.13
Mauritania	154	40.28	66.44	34.50	27.21	50.86	32.04	35.35	26.28	35.10	52.40	56.49	26.65	40.02
Haiti	155	39.28	62.75	46.97	24.33	40.85	29.02	25.81	30.25	36.06	40.81	53.80	37.10	43.62
Angola	156	38.82	61.73	35.06	32.45	43.95	25.49	34.47	31.20	30.85	42.74	51.28	26.54	50.05
Burundi	157	37.30	37.11	25.13	28.27	43.80	36.21	50.04	28.75	29.13	28.01	58.16	33.51	49.53
Syrian Arab Republic	158	37.07	21.32	12.76	19.90	25.98	37.29	32.16	39.24	39.30	67.47	65.52	43.01	40.93
Sudan	159	36.57	31.46	23.44	19.40	45.68	38.99	41.62	33.77	24.00	45.10	59.46	34.25	41.64
Eritrea	160	34.94	52.50	13.21	17.50	39.55	33.28	32.81	28.69	31.28	31.41	58.94	29.66	50.45
Democratic Republic of Congo	161	34.55	32.09	36.11	23.29	41.09	28.55	38.64	22.88	28.71	28.01	51.02	31.64	52.62
Afghanistan	162	34.35	19.27	33.85	32.43	23.99	34.88	46.32	28.50	35.37	38.13	49.76	28.38	41.33
Somalia	163	34.06	34.82	28.84	18.09	47.71	36.48	32.55	32.42	26.87	36.98	46.13	21.90	45.97
Chad	164	32.51	47.17	34.58	20.97	39.05	28.81	30.79	20.75	32.72	29.32	35.52	17.94	52.49
Yemen	165	31.87	24.61	18.60	16.05	41.40	28.66	34.11	25.23	23.23	43.42	55.01	27.51	44.58
Central African Republic	166	31.36	37.52	33.46	24.47	38.68	30.82	32.01	20.06	34.48	19.08	36.13	18.24	51.39
South Sudan	167	27.89	14.46	19.34	16.30	36.87	32.43	35.42	32.21	26.96	23.73	36.89	12.44	47.62

=== 2019 ===
Country	Rank	Average Score	Safety & Security	Personal Freedom	Governance	Social Capital	Investment Environment	Enterprise Conditions	Market Access & Infrastructure	Economic Quality	Living Conditions	Health	Education	Natural Environment
Denmark	1	83.96	92.93	92.88	88.97	77.14	81.14	84.44	77.81	74.02	97.08	82.76	87.84	70.50
Norway	2	83.96	93.84	94.56	90.38	77.49	83.29	83.54	74.77	73.17	95.84	83.37	85.99	71.27
Switzerland	3	83.64	93.97	85.98	87.35	72.42	78.71	88.17	78.15	79.56	96.36	84.16	85.69	73.20
Sweden	4	83.04	91.40	89.87	88.10	70.59	79.19	82.25	79.06	75.40	96.76	81.96	84.36	77.53
Finland	5	82.39	89.54	90.76	89.78	73.78	80.54	79.94	77.42	68.45	95.91	79.96	86.58	75.98
Netherlands	6	82.19	91.27	89.73	88.72	73.28	78.92	84.36	80.38	74.72	96.94	82.62	86.41	58.92
New Zealand	7	81.24	90.16	86.47	88.20	73.18	82.45	82.24	73.20	68.95	91.40	80.83	86.03	71.73
Germany	8	81.14	88.41	85.26	85.58	67.15	78.37	87.17	77.34	74.88	96.31	82.35	83.24	67.56
Luxembourg	9	80.95	93.24	88.11	86.62	61.82	76.69	81.71	81.86	74.08	95.67	81.44	79.20	71.02
Iceland	10	80.72	92.72	89.05	84.30	74.52	73.10	75.04	76.65	70.64	93.43	82.82	85.28	71.08
United Kingdom	11	80.70	89.56	84.47	84.59	66.58	82.07	84.98	77.68	70.92	95.78	80.54	84.88	66.39
Ireland	12	80.38	90.09	87.76	83.85	67.42	74.28	83.35	72.92	75.55	94.68	80.86	84.80	69.02
Austria	13	80.26	91.53	83.51	82.95	67.72	79.00	79.85	74.32	68.44	94.55	82.51	83.01	75.69
Canada	14	80.01	89.46	88.63	84.78	69.10	78.70	81.96	73.86	63.39	94.29	80.20	86.73	68.96
Hong Kong	15	79.90	92.96	66.90	81.25	58.90	81.94	90.78	81.75	73.88	94.50	83.10	87.57	65.31
Singapore	16	79.15	91.95	51.99	75.28	63.69	87.71	87.02	84.81	79.70	95.61	86.63	90.69	54.68
Australia	17	78.64	86.09	85.02	84.51	66.48	80.27	78.26	69.79	64.88	93.34	81.78	86.21	67.03
United States	18	77.75	74.38	78.71	79.03	65.83	80.40	89.51	79.00	69.78	90.38	74.94	85.00	66.09
Japan	19	77.06	91.50	72.14	80.56	44.45	78.31	83.02	74.79	67.03	93.58	86.25	86.46	66.55
Malta	20	76.40	89.34	82.79	77.51	64.57	68.69	77.27	68.89	71.20	95.31	82.05	78.44	60.80
Estonia	21	76.31	82.88	75.62	79.74	56.51	76.83	78.61	72.88	73.33	90.82	75.27	83.69	69.52
Belgium	22	76.26	84.84	84.40	80.82	55.01	73.44	80.00	74.62	64.52	93.86	80.53	83.57	59.58
France	23	76.26	84.41	77.14	79.09	56.02	78.02	76.45	74.79	63.51	93.86	81.89	81.23	68.71
Taiwan	24	74.83	91.70	74.60	76.03	54.22	77.62	82.27	70.59	67.72	86.95	79.37	81.61	55.23
Spain	25	74.79	83.42	82.56	73.83	58.65	72.62	75.23	72.95	58.29	94.37	82.07	82.88	60.65
Portugal	26	73.75	86.38	86.09	75.02	53.91	70.16	75.25	72.47	57.91	91.29	79.40	77.30	59.83
Slovenia	27	73.66	87.68	74.49	67.59	56.43	66.08	68.23	70.60	65.05	91.86	79.22	82.84	73.84
Czech Republic	28	73.43	89.14	71.66	70.32	47.10	72.72	70.36	68.74	72.52	89.91	79.77	81.78	67.19
South Korea	29	73.04	82.22	64.41	70.33	42.48	76.82	70.80	73.71	73.38	91.56	84.16	89.44	57.16
Italy	30	71.68	86.41	74.17	63.80	53.30	66.17	76.65	69.27	57.16	91.61	81.83	80.29	59.56
Israel	31	70.90	57.17	58.51	78.59	53.11	78.32	76.85	69.64	69.65	93.30	82.37	82.43	50.88
Slovakia	32	70.25	86.03	69.87	62.45	50.93	70.65	63.46	64.80	64.74	89.64	77.11	73.58	69.74
Lithuania	33	70.16	85.34	68.14	67.54	42.64	69.98	69.81	68.30	64.17	87.69	70.94	81.66	65.71
Cyprus	34	69.99	80.22	76.42	67.86	50.51	64.38	68.16	69.59	57.74	90.32	79.69	78.41	56.54
Latvia	35	69.94	82.32	68.11	64.89	45.07	68.42	69.50	67.48	64.27	87.57	71.34	80.56	69.80
Poland	36	69.30	88.36	60.17	63.95	47.13	67.71	71.22	65.14	62.92	89.94	77.49	78.94	58.65
Chile	37	68.70	72.48	74.48	70.88	52.36	67.99	68.42	68.79	57.54	85.62	73.10	73.90	58.87
Costa Rica	38	67.66	77.19	79.21	67.49	54.13	61.74	64.50	58.36	53.39	82.03	78.62	71.46	63.83
Uruguay	39	67.61	80.63	82.39	70.36	52.88	65.35	58.02	58.65	50.82	84.69	78.86	69.45	59.25
United Arab Emirates	40	67.41	77.15	32.95	59.80	61.85	71.94	77.17	74.19	68.87	86.89	76.14	72.73	49.20
Malaysia	41	66.62	69.82	40.01	56.13	58.74	72.04	75.85	67.14	66.19	79.76	77.62	74.86	61.30
Greece	42	66.51	80.38	65.35	62.13	46.97	52.40	70.69	68.06	44.77	87.68	79.06	75.30	65.31
Qatar	43	66.45	89.78	33.75	55.79	61.22	63.29	74.43	69.86	68.31	86.36	76.07	66.74	51.87
Mauritius	44	66.41	81.56	68.56	66.37	57.24	68.23	65.80	59.07	53.61	81.35	75.36	67.91	51.89
Croatia	45	66.19	84.23	63.61	59.25	44.09	61.53	53.12	67.79	58.26	89.15	75.02	73.64	64.55
Hungary	46	65.93	81.11	53.21	50.86	49.48	64.34	61.20	63.66	64.95	88.14	75.43	74.04	64.72
Romania	47	64.59	80.99	60.87	59.06	46.82	68.14	56.94	61.41	60.80	79.82	73.00	68.51	58.73
Seychelles	48	64.34	76.47	59.57	56.38	56.92	60.11	61.83	60.28	59.24	78.42	77.87	66.34	58.65
Bulgaria	49	64.08	73.48	58.88	54.98	46.13	60.64	62.19	58.89	64.12	83.84	74.02	74.78	56.98
Montenegro	50	63.57	78.57	61.08	57.63	51.33	63.14	62.54	60.60	48.37	83.35	71.10	72.00	53.14
Panama	51	63.29	77.34	63.72	54.51	51.92	60.33	55.54	61.20	59.79	76.61	76.78	59.13	62.59
Serbia	52	62.07	80.06	55.70	51.32	48.47	57.23	59.53	57.11	49.85	84.43	72.98	74.55	53.58
Georgia	53	61.71	71.63	61.67	58.38	46.13	67.59	63.64	60.99	48.49	71.50	71.22	71.49	47.84
North Macedonia	54	61.10	71.94	54.07	51.87	50.11	61.78	61.46	55.74	49.92	83.66	75.05	61.12	56.49
Trinidad and Tobago	55	61.03	72.34	68.05	55.37	51.15	54.96	52.49	53.82	51.91	82.58	72.44	66.23	51.06
Peru	56	61.03	71.49	64.68	52.18	42.35	61.56	57.49	51.93	53.00	69.51	74.92	67.27	66.00
China	57	60.76	65.83	19.97	46.88	57.25	63.26	69.36	60.42	68.38	79.72	80.86	70.83	46.31
Bahrain	58	60.61	58.79	25.91	47.15	63.26	63.84	65.20	68.48	53.32	88.25	75.37	68.90	48.90
Argentina	59	60.47	68.28	74.08	56.22	47.01	53.37	48.00	48.07	42.19	80.79	76.30	71.96	59.35
Oman	60	60.30	81.63	31.82	47.87	58.14	60.87	63.52	64.95	51.32	79.92	74.80	65.14	43.67
Armenia	61	60.14	71.48	53.92	50.12	50.94	61.34	60.51	54.15	44.33	76.00	73.65	72.29	52.97
Kuwait	62	60.08	72.03	41.45	46.78	54.18	54.86	54.27	60.48	60.15	88.83	75.46	61.13	51.36
Indonesia	63	60.01	67.58	48.59	54.45	73.43	60.20	60.24	48.43	54.10	65.37	69.00	60.96	57.72
Jamaica	64	59.86	62.75	70.15	56.28	49.83	60.22	59.61	51.71	41.60	79.51	75.46	62.92	48.29
Albania	65	59.83	73.32	56.96	51.34	46.25	58.64	58.57	55.98	41.45	72.34	73.22	72.68	57.23
Thailand	66	59.53	57.33	39.95	44.59	58.95	61.02	56.03	59.91	65.18	77.02	78.75	63.61	52.03
Mexico	67	59.53	48.83	59.09	48.63	46.39	60.07	56.49	60.34	59.21	75.70	78.22	64.86	56.54
Kazakhstan	68	59.12	69.52	32.88	47.63	51.46	62.09	57.31	52.18	56.95	81.12	71.81	77.45	48.97
Brazil	69	59.08	64.71	65.42	52.84	44.27	57.45	51.52	48.60	42.72	79.84	74.96	59.83	66.76
Bosnia and Herzegovina	70	58.15	76.87	52.91	45.21	49.57	53.30	49.36	50.81	47.84	84.20	70.42	66.65	50.66
Saudi Arabia	71	57.94	62.11	20.73	47.83	55.14	58.38	66.19	62.03	54.71	81.15	73.30	66.33	47.45
Colombia	72	57.91	39.33	57.24	52.09	48.41	58.03	56.00	53.82	48.72	75.04	76.98	64.94	64.35
Belarus	73	57.85	71.44	30.73	40.59	42.39	54.16	53.64	53.25	55.24	85.14	72.49	79.77	55.39
Russia	74	57.72	49.89	31.70	45.59	47.94	55.82	54.93	53.55	59.70	81.31	68.31	83.50	60.38
Sri Lanka	75	57.49	59.37	54.39	50.70	59.99	48.99	60.42	45.84	42.13	67.03	75.55	66.46	59.07
Botswana	76	57.49	70.18	61.02	60.16	49.78	57.20	56.82	45.71	58.48	60.79	62.09	54.12	53.54
Cabo Verde	77	57.36	76.10	70.55	54.58	54.69	44.84	51.38	38.54	42.47	67.13	72.25	52.99	62.78
Dominican Republic	78	57.33	60.15	62.09	46.52	50.44	53.27	52.54	52.68	50.59	73.30	71.52	56.74	58.16
Paraguay	79	57.17	72.01	56.23	46.61	53.70	52.18	41.81	46.79	48.45	76.82	72.08	52.58	66.75
Ecuador	80	56.76	71.49	60.57	44.06	49.29	49.41	42.31	49.54	42.86	72.70	74.15	65.93	58.86
Moldova	81	56.74	70.06	50.12	47.93	47.59	53.90	51.22	54.42	41.61	77.02	69.19	68.87	48.93
Suriname	82	56.70	75.91	63.41	48.18	52.04	37.73	48.37	46.51	43.26	77.12	66.96	54.07	66.90
South Africa	83	56.65	53.25	69.07	58.50	54.74	57.92	63.10	50.31	50.20	65.22	57.84	52.09	47.53
Philippines	84	56.49	43.06	58.82	49.01	59.32	52.65	56.74	52.47	55.14	59.78	68.70	62.85	59.33
Vietnam	85	56.48	68.19	32.86	43.47	58.27	46.07	51.25	53.29	54.51	73.46	77.29	64.49	54.57
Jordan	86	56.41	69.48	39.16	50.30	47.41	61.00	60.87	54.23	39.79	80.39	72.23	57.57	44.54
Mongolia	87	56.19	73.92	59.58	54.24	52.08	48.45	52.88	36.89	43.80	65.29	68.84	68.93	49.37
Kyrgyzstan	88	56.18	72.69	49.32	45.58	56.57	50.68	50.65	37.28	45.42	71.61	71.27	64.31	58.72
Namibia	89	56.11	75.11	63.13	61.53	52.71	54.62	53.82	47.74	42.26	60.17	60.23	45.12	56.84
Guyana	90	55.93	70.69	59.52	49.69	50.81	51.58	50.49	43.38	39.88	75.34	63.93	58.71	57.17
Turkey	91	55.42	42.96	30.14	43.76	42.04	62.60	61.01	58.93	51.36	82.49	74.04	63.57	52.11
Azerbaijan	92	55.22	65.85	27.04	43.04	45.77	60.25	61.54	53.32	43.92	77.74	73.66	64.60	45.88
Sao Tome and Principe	93	55.20	81.57	65.13	49.57	52.49	40.82	53.00	38.06	45.89	58.33	67.76	51.06	58.78
Belize	94	55.08	71.57	60.48	46.79	45.18	41.76	48.92	43.94	41.45	74.12	69.66	56.29	60.75
Tunisia	95	54.71	61.56	53.36	53.34	42.65	50.93	50.91	49.90	42.41	76.73	70.40	57.84	46.51
Ukraine	96	54.50	46.18	53.71	48.62	41.91	45.58	57.03	48.43	42.91	77.76	64.76	77.49	49.65
Cuba	97	54.45	67.59	26.38	38.50	54.86	52.80	37.09	44.06	45.63	75.77	79.90	76.32	54.49
El Salvador	98	54.16	59.73	58.74	49.28	48.17	52.82	53.07	46.70	44.24	71.86	71.42	50.71	43.25
Guatemala	99	54.11	63.55	54.59	44.29	52.36	52.81	50.17	52.31	48.76	60.57	68.88	46.15	54.90
Morocco	100	53.92	74.95	40.16	46.25	35.54	58.87	54.16	56.80	44.32	71.44	66.54	46.63	51.34
India	101	53.77	53.75	49.22	59.70	50.91	54.53	67.63	48.80	48.36	55.10	66.60	49.99	40.63
Ghana	102	53.74	66.83	64.15	56.03	52.76	47.92	57.43	38.26	35.34	58.75	63.60	50.25	53.53
Uzbekistan	103	53.53	73.32	29.73	33.86	61.57	53.21	45.71	43.01	52.08	67.84	77.33	63.34	41.42
Lebanon	104	52.86	47.40	46.58	40.86	42.07	48.94	55.95	49.70	37.04	83.62	72.07	61.78	48.25
Bolivia	105	52.74	71.14	57.32	40.41	46.31	45.10	39.12	37.57	39.41	68.48	66.92	57.73	63.40
Rwanda	106	52.71	61.76	41.53	53.56	51.59	65.59	63.12	41.54	47.43	43.00	67.52	42.08	53.76
Honduras	107	52.28	57.09	50.44	40.25	52.34	51.73	49.31	43.57	43.84	63.06	71.95	47.45	56.28
Turkmenistan	108	51.67	70.80	18.65	31.71	56.45	52.79	43.13	39.75	52.93	74.63	74.56	64.28	40.40
Nicaragua	109	51.58	66.32	42.92	38.33	47.58	48.01	43.72	44.27	41.23	66.92	72.32	48.72	58.63
Algeria	110	51.48	76.25	34.12	42.47	41.86	38.56	43.23	42.49	38.33	77.28	72.93	61.01	49.26
Senegal	111	51.00	66.81	60.41	54.50	53.80	42.95	53.52	34.88	39.87	57.02	60.95	33.83	53.44
Gabon	112	50.73	66.42	43.32	39.89	42.16	45.65	51.20	39.96	42.56	65.37	58.35	55.14	58.72
Kenya	113	50.54	44.92	47.72	47.95	55.09	59.15	57.64	41.37	37.50	49.27	64.49	51.87	49.51
Tajikistan	114	50.28	69.74	28.56	37.13	59.01	44.71	48.15	33.37	33.97	66.93	72.63	60.58	48.63
Nepal	115	49.53	71.06	59.46	44.66	49.47	42.03	46.22	27.88	44.68	51.67	63.01	45.93	48.33
Laos	116	49.08	73.50	28.30	38.69	47.81	38.66	48.72	38.07	48.12	53.70	60.87	51.69	60.80
Equatorial Guinea	117	48.86	70.09	26.80	40.20	52.37	43.67	48.48	38.39	52.67	62.95	45.62	42.94	62.07
Zambia	118	48.50	69.59	46.17	46.26	50.68	46.53	54.63	28.83	32.13	43.21	59.51	42.84	61.61
Iran	119	48.31	56.79	16.91	38.27	45.17	42.73	39.39	39.71	42.85	77.08	71.31	65.50	44.08
Tanzania	120	48.02	64.36	45.81	46.48	48.01	44.07	49.33	33.43	41.01	46.97	60.68	38.20	57.92
Djibouti	121	47.88	64.66	34.77	41.28	47.66	49.86	52.64	39.30	48.47	52.83	62.00	34.44	46.65
Cambodia	122	47.84	64.31	36.10	29.46	49.75	42.76	41.16	43.30	48.56	50.29	68.88	43.61	55.92
Papua New Guinea	123	47.51	66.15	61.40	43.54	46.15	45.81	49.90	33.66	42.60	35.76	52.15	35.33	57.65
Myanmar	124	47.28	38.77	35.54	37.62	58.18	36.03	50.82	39.92	43.75	49.47	66.93	50.66	59.71
Gambia	125	46.97	69.59	43.76	43.69	55.20	44.39	47.31	31.64	29.95	51.51	53.71	37.49	55.45
Egypt	126	46.56	41.32	19.08	36.12	45.46	47.05	53.90	47.38	34.97	73.39	66.20	51.10	42.76
Bangladesh	127	46.47	48.54	40.77	39.12	50.84	36.72	52.42	36.12	40.76	56.46	65.67	44.28	45.87
Malawi	128	46.35	69.10	55.54	47.37	39.76	44.00	49.10	30.96	36.47	37.52	57.13	31.61	57.62
Comoros	129	45.98	78.99	52.25	38.38	47.69	33.79	45.67	27.26	34.50	50.50	57.87	31.58	53.22
Ivory Coast	130	45.95	56.73	50.55	44.43	41.45	45.15	49.60	35.89	44.67	48.95	48.62	31.21	54.10
Benin	131	45.87	73.19	59.46	47.31	37.29	35.92	51.22	32.20	36.08	42.83	52.52	31.21	51.17
Swaziland	132	45.75	68.90	29.36	38.65	44.18	48.08	46.43	35.89	41.12	54.61	52.38	41.10	48.31
Lesotho	133	45.59	67.36	53.58	44.88	45.62	41.01	47.03	34.60	41.04	44.22	42.68	43.61	41.49
Burkina Faso	134	45.17	63.14	60.68	44.12	45.90	39.79	48.61	24.96	35.64	42.39	56.08	26.99	53.68
Uganda	135	45.15	54.91	40.76	41.98	43.08	53.86	54.66	30.72	37.91	43.25	54.00	36.64	50.02
Liberia	136	44.38	70.73	52.93	44.69	52.70	38.95	48.71	20.58	32.43	40.95	45.45	25.95	58.51
Madagascar	137	43.63	63.60	53.19	39.95	47.40	40.54	43.34	27.79	36.79	27.60	55.00	32.77	55.60
Guinea-Bissau	138	43.49	77.07	49.87	36.58	48.31	31.95	45.31	25.94	38.29	36.21	50.13	24.30	57.95
Zimbabwe	139	43.10	66.34	37.12	31.74	47.14	34.93	35.28	26.93	34.36	50.23	57.50	46.13	49.55
Pakistan	140	43.09	37.04	38.17	41.46	49.65	45.82	46.24	34.05	36.57	54.91	59.93	38.23	35.09
Guinea	141	43.07	60.51	47.82	39.09	49.22	43.43	52.41	25.13	31.40	39.43	46.52	22.33	59.50
Iraq	142	42.96	22.62	33.10	35.81	49.21	35.59	44.70	37.93	42.04	69.72	61.24	44.40	39.10
Venezuela	143	42.82	45.51	35.99	17.99	43.91	31.06	21.72	34.67	24.47	69.77	72.49	58.61	57.63
Togo	144	42.69	64.95	44.73	38.19	34.00	36.49	44.34	26.03	40.36	45.73	51.88	37.61	47.93
Mozambique	145	42.62	66.18	53.76	40.47	48.69	36.96	40.33	25.77	22.45	38.97	53.22	26.74	57.87
Sierra Leone	146	42.26	66.79	53.58	42.02	53.95	35.27	41.15	23.40	28.03	35.97	42.17	29.38	55.37
Libya	147	42.08	31.15	33.44	28.89	46.93	30.40	32.77	32.23	38.01	71.65	68.38	50.19	40.93
Nigeria	148	41.99	36.68	48.92	40.33	52.03	44.44	45.34	28.81	30.18	46.04	43.35	35.99	51.79
Mali	149	41.72	40.31	54.17	43.96	44.80	36.82	44.90	25.96	40.85	44.14	49.58	21.72	53.49
Ethiopia	150	41.14	51.18	26.91	36.12	46.81	38.13	41.28	28.13	37.71	42.36	58.10	35.58	51.38
Niger	151	41.00	53.84	52.75	41.72	50.37	35.83	44.40	23.14	37.67	34.83	50.72	16.22	50.45
Cameroon	152	40.96	37.61	36.79	32.12	44.16	37.53	43.95	28.38	40.59	48.95	46.37	42.23	52.82
Haiti	153	40.06	67.58	48.45	33.25	40.66	28.85	26.21	24.31	32.93	40.68	52.81	41.48	43.56
Congo	154	39.91	51.42	37.74	32.90	38.04	34.60	34.04	26.67	27.38	45.02	53.81	40.82	56.45
Mauritania	155	38.56	65.45	31.73	28.78	40.25	29.84	35.65	23.02	34.36	52.31	56.17	24.50	40.64
Angola	156	38.14	62.23	34.15	34.01	40.00	23.55	32.90	26.40	34.56	42.89	50.04	25.90	50.98
Syrian Arab Republic	157	37.66	25.48	12.46	25.38	22.27	37.17	33.73	38.71	39.38	67.69	65.94	41.93	41.78
Sudan	158	36.68	30.81	16.05	28.89	43.44	40.46	43.13	29.80	26.68	45.37	57.94	33.60	44.03
Burundi	159	36.21	35.85	23.81	31.86	41.00	33.54	49.28	25.44	28.51	28.53	56.48	30.25	49.95
Eritrea	160	35.55	48.08	11.32	25.08	40.61	34.54	33.79	22.69	31.90	39.68	60.31	25.59	53.01
Somalia	161	33.96	40.78	28.31	24.93	47.24	28.19	30.94	19.40	27.17	40.82	44.18	24.91	50.61
Democratic Republic of Congo	162	33.60	33.25	32.52	25.10	38.74	28.23	34.10	18.21	30.81	28.93	48.49	31.88	52.97
Afghanistan	163	33.46	20.86	34.42	33.94	23.64	33.21	37.92	21.75	40.17	38.54	49.85	26.04	41.22
Chad	164	32.88	47.96	37.10	26.56	33.59	29.94	30.01	17.81	33.30	29.83	34.93	18.62	54.86
Central African Republic	165	31.72	35.20	34.42	29.84	37.02	28.25	31.68	20.91	33.18	21.19	35.70	19.08	54.12
Yemen	166	31.14	25.23	16.65	24.66	38.42	29.07	32.30	20.71	19.92	43.96	51.55	26.56	44.60
South Sudan	167	29.76	19.20	19.52	27.41	35.69	32.44	37.15	25.88	28.33	27.75	34.04	15.22	54.52

== Legatum Institute ==
The Legatum Institute publishes the index.

=== Personnel ===
The Director of the Prosperity Index is Dr. Stephen Brien. The Prosperity Index is reviewed and critiqued by an advisory panel of academics and scholars representing a range of disciplines and includes: Prof Tim Besley (London School of Economics); Dr. Daniel Drezner (Tufts University); Dr. Carol Graham (Brookings Institution); Dr. Edmund Malesky (University of California, San Diego); Dr. Ann Owen (Hamilton College).

The Legatum Institute's International Advisory Group also contributes and assists in the Prosperity Index: Prof Peter Skerry (Boston College); Prof Dan Chirot (University of Washington); Toby Mundy CEO (Atlantic Books); and Patrick Cheung.

== See also ==
- Bhutan GNH Index
- Broad measures of economic progress
- Democracy Ranking
- Demographic economics
- Economic development
- Gender Development Index
- Genuine Progress Indicator
- Global Financial Centres Index
- Global Peace Index
- Gross National Happiness
- Gross National Well-being
- Happiness economics
- Happy Planet Index
- Human Development Index
- Human Development and Capability Association
- Human Poverty Index
- Index of Sustainable Economic Welfare
- International development
- Millennium Development Goals
- OECD Better Life Index
- Psychometrics
- Subjective life satisfaction
- System of National Accounts
- Welfare economics
- Where-to-be-born Index
- World Happiness Report
- World Values Survey
