= Virgin Unite =

Independent charitable arm of the Virgin Group

- Company type: private charitable foundation
- Industry: Charitable organization
- Predecessor: The Healthcare Foundation (1987)
- Founded: London, England (2004)
- Founder: Sir Richard Branson
- Headquarters: London, United Kingdom
- Area served: Worldwide, including Great Britain; South Africa; United States; Australia; Canada
- Key people: Sir Richard Branson, Chairman; Jean Oelwang, CEO & Managing Director; Natalie Imbruglia, Ambassador
- Owner: Virgin Group
- Number of employees: 20+ full time staff members
- Parent: The Virgin Foundation
- Website: www.virginunite.com

Virgin Unite is the working name of The Virgin Foundation, the independent charitable arm of the Virgin Group. Created by Richard Branson and Virgin employees in September 2004, Virgin Unite pools volunteering efforts from across the Virgin Group and its hundreds of subsidiaries and associated companies to grow the efforts of smaller grassroots charitable organizations. Partnered with more than a dozen charities worldwide the company also provides a resource through the Internet by serving as an online donation centre for those wanting to contribute.

The primary aims of the foundation are to make sustainable change through economic development towards tough social and environmental issues. These include addressing the issue of delivering healthcare to rural parts of Africa. Branson and Virgin underwrite all the operating costs of the organization, so 100% of contributions can be applied towards causes.

== History ==
=== Parent charitable organizations – 1987 ===
AIDS was first recognized on June 5, 1981. In 1986, it was reported that three to five million Americans would be HIV positive and one million would be dead of AIDS by 1996. In response to such reports, Virgin incorporated a charitable group called The Healthcare Foundation on August 3, 1987, to provide research in and education about AIDS. In July 1988, the foundation's charitable objectives expanded to include the relief of poverty and the relief of disabled persons from their disabilities.

=== Virgin Unite – 2004 ===
In 2003, the foundation sought to determine what others thought it should focus on. After spending six months speaking with social issues groups, Virgin Group suppliers and partners, and numerous Virgin staff members in South Africa, Australia, the United States and the United Kingdom, the organization concluded that many people and companies were deterred from participating in philanthropic activities by the complexities of the charity sector. The foundation sought then to use the Virgin Group's corporate and organizational experience to identify the best practices in this sector and to facilitate the entry of new participants.

Between 1987 and 2004, Virgin Unite operated first as The Healthcare Foundation and then The Virgin Healthcare Foundation. In mid-September 2004, Virgin established the subsidiary The Virgin Foundation doing business as Virgin Unite in the United Kingdom to coordinate all Virgin's worldwide charitable ventures. Citing the spread of HIV in Africa and the twin problems of malaria and malnutrition as the first priority issues, Branson explained his reasoning behind Virgin Unite:

I've reached the age [54] where I've made a lot of money, the companies are going really well and we've got a lot of talented people working for us. Now we are going to turn our business skills into tackling issues around the world where we can help. ... In the next 30 years or so I can make an enormous difference to a lot of people's lives just by using the strength of my own brand name and being able to pick up the phone and get through to the President of Nigeria or Thabo Mbeki. We have the financial resources and the business know-how. If the Virgin foundation works as I hope it will, it could be that Virgin becomes better known for that than for the businesses we are in.

=== Branding ===
Virgin Unite has created a branding scheme based around the idea of redemption to encourage Virgin company employees to donate their time, rather than their money, to one of twelve partner charities. The launch scheme included the strapline 'Spend time with your better side', a brochure, posters and promotional items that juxtapose the seven deadly sins with seven good deeds: lust is contrasted with love, for instance, and gluttony with generosity. According to Virgin Unite, this approach was largely driven by the principles of having fun and celebrating the reality of how people live their lives, while encouraging them to donate time.

=== Distribution of educational materials ===
Also in 2004, Virgin Unite helped launch "Your Finest Hour", a campaign that distributed more than one million copies of educational materials across the United Kingdom. The campaign also raised more than GB£50,000 for South Africa's "Women and Men on the Move Project", uniting three South African charities and targets vulnerable young women between ages 15 and 24, who comprise four of every five new HIV infections among South Africans in this demographic. For these actions, Virgin Unite received the Business Excellence Leadership award from the Global Business Coalition on HIV/AIDS, Tuberculosis and Malaria (GBC) in September 2005.

=== Outside the UK ===
In 2006, Virgin Unite established itself in the United States and Canada and presently is operational in South Africa and Australia. In addition, Virgin Unite was cited in 2006 as an example of organizations founded by philanthropic entrepreneurs, young billionaires putting the benefits of capitalism to charitable use.

== Activities ==
The foundation is involved in several activities, including to end obstetric fistula. It has also been involved in youth AIDS awareness campaign, and helped organize a clothing drive for homeless and at-risk youth at Virgin Megastores in cooperation with the charity StandUp For Kids. A main activity of Virgin Unite is to raise money and awareness to help defeat on a global scale what the foundation refers to as The Big 3: AIDS, HIV, and malaria/tuberculosis. In the United States, Virgin Unite is focusing on global warming and rehabilitating homeless children.

Since 2007, Virgin Unite has held the Rock the Kasbah gala in Los Angeles each year to raise funds for their programs. Rock the Kasbah is their only US fundraising event.

Joe Polish, who helped raise over $3 million for Virgin Unite, was the inaugural winner of Sir Richard and Virgin Unite's One in a Million Award, which Polish received at the 2009 Rock the Kasbah Gala. In 2010, Virgin Unite recognised Polish as their first “Entrepreneur of the Quarter”.

== See also ==
- Amnesty International
- Crisis
- END Fund
- Global health
- Natalie Imbruglia
- Oxfam
