= Luminos Fund =

International non-profit organisation

The Luminos Fund is a non-profit organisation helping children in Sub-Saharan Africa and the Middle East excluded from school due to poverty, discrimination, or conflict to have access to education. The fund was launched by Legatum in 2016.

== History ==
In 2007, Legatum partnered with the Strømme Foundation to launch accelerated learning initiatives in West Africa and later launched its own 'Speed School' programme in Ethiopia in September 2011. Following the success of these programmes, The Luminos Fund was founded by Legatum in Boston, Massachusetts, with Caitlin Baron being appointed as its first Chief Executive Officer.

=== 2017–2020 ===
In 2017, the Luminos Fund launched a programme to help refugee children in Lebanon. During that same year, the fund was among six winners of the Qatar Foundation's World Innovation Summit for Education (WISE) Awards.

In February 2020, British auction house Christie's partnered with the Luminos Fund and held a silent auction titled Educate: A Charity Exhibition at Christie's, with all proceeds going to the fund.

=== 2021–present ===
In 2021, The Luminos Fund was the winner of the University of Pennsylvania Lipman Family Prize. The following year, the fund was awarded the 2022 Klaus J. Jacobs Best Practice Prize from the Jacobs Foundation. The award recognises companies globally for working to ensure children have access to education.

In March 2023, with backing from The Luminos Fund, The Ministry of Basic and Secondary Education in Gambia launched The Gambia Classes for Open Learning Programme (GCOL) in the town of Kerewan.

In August 2023, The Luminos Fund was announced as a finalist for the 2023 P3 Impact Award.

== Impact ==
Since 2011, The Luminos Fund has commissioned a series of external evaluations by The University of Sussex Centre for International Education to understand the impact of the fund's Second Chance programme.

One longitudinal study from 2018 tracked 625 children who participated in Luminos' 10 month Second Chance programme in 2011, completed the curriculum and transitioned to government schools. The findings from The University of Sussex concluded that Luminos children continue to fare better than their government counterparts, with primary school completion rates being nearly twice as high compared to their peers.

More recently, a randomised controlled trial conducted by IDInsight between 2021 and 2022 in Liberia demonstrated that pupils who enrolled in the Luminos Fund's programme for out-of-school children from marginalised communities could read three times more words per minute by the end of the programme versus the control group.

== Partnerships ==
Since 2016, the fund has worked in partnership with ministries of education in each of the countries they operate in.

The fund works alongside community-based organisations in Ethiopia, Ghana, Lebanon, Liberia, and Gambia.

This includes the following governmental bodies:

- Ministry of Education (Ethiopia)
- Ministry of Education, Ghana
- Ministry of Education and Higher Education, Lebanon
- Ministry of Education, Liberia
- Ministry of Basic and Secondary Education, Gambia

The fund receives financial support from a number of donors, including, but not limited to: The Bill & Melinda Gates Foundation, Beverly Sherck Education Charitable Corporation, Cartier Philanthropy, The LEGO Foundation, United States Agency for International Development, Christie's, and Legatum.
