= Rock the Kasbah =

- Founder: Tim Souris
- Purpose: Virgin Unite; The Eve Branson Foundation
- Key people: Richard Branson; Eve Branson; Tim Souris
- Website: www.rockthekasbah.com

Rock the Kasbah is an annual gala fundraiser co-hosted by Sir Richard Branson and his mother Eve Branson. Funds raised go to Richard Branson's Virgin Unite foundation and also to the Eve Branson Foundation.

The first Rock the Kasbah event was held on July 2, 2007 at the Hollywood Roosevelt Hotel in Los Angeles, California. Richard Branson attended the event in formal Moroccan wear and arrived at the event by way of horseback. Branson described the first Rock the Kasbah event as "one of the best parties I've ever been to" and musical guest Jewel performed. Funds raised at this event, via ticket sales and live and silent auctions, went to help build schools in the Atlas Mountains of Morocco, as well as three villages near Kasbah Tamadot. Celebrity guests included Buzz Aldrin and Rachel Hunter.

The 2008 Rock the Kasbah event was also held at the Hollywood Roosevelt Hotel on October 23 in Los Angeles, California. Celebrity guests at that year's gala included Salma Hayek and Charlize Theron. While at the event, Theron said that Richard Branson "is an incredibly compassionate human being and is coming up with really innovative ways, under this umbrella of this foundation that he has, to really give back." Also in attendance were Neve Campbell and Natalie Imbruglia. Richard Branson was unable to attend the 2008 event due to being at sea in an attempt to set a transatlantic sailing record.

In 2009, Rock the Kasbah was held at Vibiana on October 26 in Los Angeles, California, with a mix of Moroccan and Hollywood theme. Gavin Rossdale performed and some of the celebrities in attendance were Paula Abdul, Lindsay Lohan, Sharon Stone, and Estelle.

The 2010 event took place on November 11 at the Dorothy Chandler Pavilion in Los Angeles, California, with the goal to raise at minimum $500,000. At the event, Colbie Caillat and Common performed together on stage. Sam Branson, son of Richard Branson, also performed at the event with his band Delilah. Items up for auction included a 7-night stay on Branson's own Necker Island, and a Triumph Daytona 675 World Supersport motorcycle. Celebrity guests included Jennifer Love Hewitt, Justin Long, and musician Yoshiki.

The fifth annual Rock the Kasbah event took place on November 16, 2011 and was held at Boulevard3 in Los Angeles, California. Performers playing at the 2011 Rock the Kasbah event included O.A.R., the Pussycat Dolls, and Mary J. Blige. Celebrities in attendance included Richard Branson and his mother, Eve Branson, Paris Hilton, Geena Davis, Stan Lee, will.i.am, and others. Items up for bid during the live auction included the opportunity to name a Virgin America airplane, a trip to meet Ben and Jerry and create a Ben and Jerry's ice cream flavor, an opportunity to swim with the sharks and Richard Branson, and more. Prior to the event, on 1 November 2011, a full-page ad on the back cover of Daily Variety magazine listed over 50 logos of the apparent partners in this event, including Virgin America, Virgin Atlantic, Virgin Galactic, Livestream, Tiffany & Co., Harry Winston, Gilt, Charitybuzz, and many others. Rock the Kasbah 2011 was broadcast live (for the first time) on Livestream.com, an internet streaming channel.
