= Legatum =

Private investment firm headquartered in Dubai

Legatum Limited
- Type: Private
- Founded: December 2006
- Founder: Christopher Chandler
- Headquarters: Dubai, United Arab Emirates
- Key people: Christopher Chandler, Chairman & Partner; Alan McCormick, Partner; Philip Vassiliou, Chief Investment Officer; & Partner
- Website: www.legatum.com

Legatum Limited is a private investment firm, headquartered in Dubai, United Arab Emirates. Legatum was founded in 2006 by New Zealand–born Christopher Chandler. Legatum co-owns the British broadcaster GB News.

== History and business activities ==
Legatum (meaning "legacy" or "gift") is a private investment firm based in Dubai using only capital provided by members of the firm. Legatum was founded in December 2006 in the United Arab Emirates by investor Christopher Chandler. Previously, Chandler was the president of Sovereign Global, or Sovereign, which he co-founded with his brother Richard Chandler in 1986. Sovereign invested capital in companies located in Asia, Africa, Latin America and Eastern Europe, and in industries including telecommunications, electric utilities, steel, oil and gas, banking and oil refining. The Chandler brothers embarked on separate ventures following the de-merger of Sovereign in 2006. Christopher Chandler established Legatum the following December. In 2012, Legatum purchased a building in the Dubai International Financial Centre for its global headquarters. The building was renamed Legatum Plaza, and the company moved into the building the following year.

In 2015, Legatum transitioned to a partnership, consisting of Christopher Chandler, Mark Stoleson, Philip Vassiliou and Alan McCormick, providing a structure for the firm to continue operating beyond its founders.

Mark Stoleson retired as Legatum's CEO in March 2025.

== Investments ==
The firm's investment activities tend to focus on globally listed companies, markets in economic transition (such as Japan or China), or special situations.

Legatum was one of the first foreign commercial investors to provide critical equity capital to for-profit microfinance organizations in India, investing $25 million for a majority stake in SHARE Microfinance, India's leading microfinance institution.

In 2006, the company co-founded an early charity crowdfunding platform, Razoo Global Corporation. The platform announced a management buy-out of Legatum's holding in 2017. In 2007, Legatum purchased a significant minority stake in consultant firm Intellecap, which it subsequently sold back to its owner, the Aavishkaar Group, in 2017.

In 2008, Legatum and Omidyar Network, a philanthropic investment firm founded by Pierre Omidyar, collaborated to co-invest a total of $40 million into Unitus Equity Fund II (now known as Elevar Equity). The fund is a commercial venture providing capital to businesses targeted at serving the poor in the developing world.

In 2021, Legatum invested in Mobile Premier League, an esports and gaming platform.

Also in 2021, Legatum invested in GB News, a new UK TV channel. Since 2022, it has co-owned the broadcaster under the umbrella of a holding company, All Perspectives Ltd, alongside hedge fund manager, Paul Marshall.

== Support to other entities and schemes ==
As of 2014, Legatum had invested around US$80 million in 1,440 projects in 107 countries. In 2023, the private investment firm also invested $10m of risk capital in SDG Outcomes Fund – a fund developed by UBS Optimus Foundation and Bridges Outcomes Partnerships to fund projects targeting UN sustainable development goals (SDGs) in health, education, economic empowerment, and the environment.

In 2023, Legatum co-founded the Alliance for Responsible Citizenship, an international conference alongside Jordan Peterson, Sir Paul Marshall, and Baroness Philippa Stroud, that brings together conservative thought leaders, politicians, and activists.

=== Development ===
Legatum Foundation is the development arm of Legatum and invests in community-based organizations and projects around the world to help the poorest and most marginalized people and populations in society.

From 2015 to 2025, Legatum states that its flagship initiatives – the END Fund, the Freedom Fund, and the Luminos Fund – have mobilised more than US$1bn for health, education, and economic development.

==== Luminos Fund ====
In 2016, Legatum established the Luminos Fund, a private donor philanthropic fund designed to develop and scale initiatives which promote education by helping out-of-school children get back to school. The 2020 expansion of the Speed School Programme to Ethiopia was funded by the Foundation. During the coronavirus pandemic of 2020, Luminos worked with Syrian refugees to offer educational support and therapeutic interventions for school-aged children. By February 2020, the Luminos Fund had provided education for 132,611 children in Ethiopia, Lebanon and Liberia, whose access had been limited due to conflict, discrimination or poverty.

In 2025, Legatum recommitted $10 million to help expand access to accelerated learning programmes for out-of-school children in sub-Saharan Africa and the Middle East.

==== END Fund ====
Legatum founded the END Fund in 2012 to co-ordinate and support programmes to treat neglected tropical diseases. Legatum first started funding NTD work in 2006, after Legatum partner Alan McCormick visited Professor Alan Fenwick (Professor of Tropical Parasitology) at Imperial College London, who in turn had founded the Schistosomiasis Control Initiative in 2002. It has since led to Legatum investing over $10m in efforts to eliminate NTDs.

Since 2018, the END Fund has administered the Reaching the Last Mile Fund (RLMF), in collaboration with Sheikh Mohamed bin Zayed Al Nahyan and the Bill & Melinda Gates Foundation. The fund supports programmes to eliminate river blindness and lymphatic filariasis (LF).

The END Fund has also supported lymphatic filariasis elimination programmes through work with the Pan American Health Organization (PAHO) in Guyana. Since 2019, the END Fund has contributed US$1.2 million to PAHO.

==== Freedom Fund ====
In 2013, in partnership with Humanity United and Walk Free, Legatum established a $100 million fund called the Freedom Fund. The aim of the fund is to help eradicate modern day slavery. Prior to the founding of the Fund, Legatum sponsored a 2012 information-gathering trip for non-profit organizations in Nepal and India to learn more about the human trafficking and slave-trade industries there. (see also Human trafficking in Nepal, Human trafficking in India)

==== Resilio Fund ====
In 2025, Legatum launched the Resilio Fund. The aim of the fund is to raise $500 million to develop local responses for those in need. This involves dispensing micro-grants between $2,000 to $10,000 to support first responders in countries such as Myanmar, Ethiopia, Somalia, Lebanon, India, and the Philippines.

In the same year, Legatum launched "Leading with Character: a 30-day online course to cultivate leader character" in collaboration with the Oxford Character Project at the University of Oxford and the Human Flourishing Program at Harvard University.

=== Entrepreneurship ===
In 2007, Legatum established The Legatum Center for Entrepreneurship at MIT – later renamed the MIT Kuo Sharper Center for Prosperity and Entrepreneurship – with the aim to create a generation of business leaders in developing countries by providing them with the skills needed to succeed as entrepreneurs. Fellowships are granted to students who show entrepreneurial ambition and an interest in making a lasting and positive economic impact on low-income countries.

Throughout 2017, the Center had distributed over $7 million to 213 fellows and launched enterprises across 40 countries. The Legatum fellows have pursued businesses that tackle social issues such as improving sanitation by converting waste products into fertiliser in Kenya, establishing plastic recycling businesses in Nigeria, and improving the clothing industry's conditions in Tanzania.

Legatum established the annual Africa Awards for Entrepreneurship program, which recognises and rewards business leaders who serve as role models to Africa's aspiring entrepreneurs. The scheme has been in operation since 2007 and is now run by the African Leadership Network, with Legatum still involved as a lead sponsor.

In 2008, Legatum partnered with Fortune magazine to announce the Legatum Fortune Technology Prize, a $1 million award intended to reward for-profit businesses who provide products and services to the needy through the use of technology.

In 2013, Legatum launched the Centre for Entrepreneurs (CFE) in partnership with Luke Johnson to promote and support entrepreneurs in the UK.

=== Policy ===
Legatum founded the Prosperity Institute (formerly known as the Legatum Institute), based in London, in 2007.
