= END Fund =

Philanthropic fund dedicated to ending neglected tropical diseases

The END Fund (Ending Neglected Diseases) is a private non-profit organisation dedicated to combating the five most common neglected tropical diseases (NTDs) that cause up to 90% of the NTD burden in Sub-Saharan Africa.

The fund also helps deliver treatments for children and adults and provide surgeries for NTD-related disabilities, and provides training for healthcare workers in remote communities. As of 2022, the END Fund had provided for 96,018 surgeries and $2.34b worth of treatments since 2012.

== History ==
The END Fund was founded by Legatum in 2012. In 2006, prior to the creation of The END Fund, Legatum funded neglected tropical disease programs in Rwanda and Burundi. Over four years, eight million people were treated for diseases such as intestinal worms, schistosomiasis and lymphatic filariasis.

=== 2012-2016 ===
In 2012, following the programs launched in 2006, the END Fund was founded by Legatum to scale up the support for programmes to treat neglected tropical diseases.

Ellen Agler was named as Chief Executive Officer.

In 2014, The END Fund announced they received a $7 million three-year grant from The Leona M. and Harry B. Helmsley Charitable Trust to fund the work of the neglected tropical diseases programs in Angola.

=== 2017-2019 ===
From 2017 to 2019, the organisation received $3 million from Alwaleed Philanthropies to support the work to control and eliminate NTDs in Africa and the Middle East.

In 2017, the END Fund partnered with the Zimbabwean Ministry of Health and Child Care, Econet Global and Higherlife Foundation to launch a campaign which sent text messages to millions of people in Zimbabwe informing them of ongoing mass drug administration programs for NTDs.

In 2018, Virgin Unite partnered with the END Fund to help distribute NTD treatments.

In 2019 the END Fund launched the Deworming Innovation Fund which aims to end intestinal worms and schistosomiasis that affect children in Ethiopia, Rwanda, Zimbabwe, and Kenya.

=== COVID-19 Pandemic ===
In response to the COVID-19 pandemic, The END Fund partnered with The Luminos Fund in 2020 to support their efforts in rural Liberia through its COVID-19 Response Fund.

=== 2021-present ===
In June 2022, in response to the Kigali Declaration on NTDs, The END Fund committed $161m to support The World Health Organization's 2021–30 road map for NTDs.

In 2023, British business magnate Sir Richard Branson published a blog in support of the END Fund and The Audacious Project's Deworming Innovation Fund which aims to end parasitic worm infections.

In 2023, The END Fund worked on two photography projects partnering with the WHO and Photo Vogue to highlight the impact of Neglected Tropical Diseases on individuals and communities.

== Funded Programs ==
The END Fund has three funds as investment opportunities for private philanthropists, foundations, and corporations.

- Flagship Fund
- Deworming Innovation Fund
- Reaching The Last Mile Fund

== Partnerships ==
The END Fund receives financial support from a wide variety of corporations, non-profit organisations, individual donors and investors. Significant partnerships include Virgin Unite, The Bill & Melinda Gates Foundation, Alwaleed Philanthropies, The Leona M. and Harry B. Helmsley Charitable Trust, The Children's Investment Fund Foundation, Good Ventures and Legatum.
