= Baba Gana Kingibe =

Nigerian diplomat and politician (born 1945)

Babagana Kingibe OV GCON
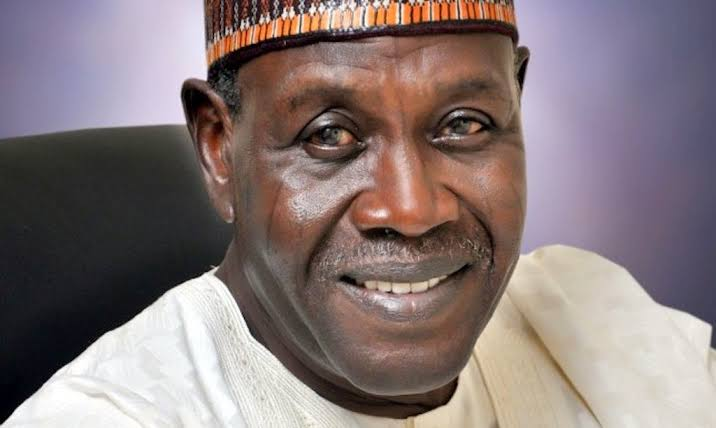

Secretary to the Government of the Federation
- In office June 2007 – Sept 2008
- President: Umaru Yar'Adua
- Preceded by: Ufot Ekaette
- Succeeded by: Mahmud Yayale Ahmed

Minister of Power and Steel
- In office 1997–1998
- Head of State: Sani Abacha
- Preceded by: Bashir Dalhatu
- Succeeded by: Bello Suleiman

Minister of Internal Affairs
- In office 1995–1997
- Head of State: Sani Abacha
- Preceded by: Alex Ibru
- Succeeded by: Bashir Dalhatu

Minister of Foreign Affairs
- In office 1993–1995
- Head of State: Sani Abacha
- Preceded by: Matthew Mbu
- Succeeded by: Tom Ikimi

Chairman of the Social Democratic Party
- In office 1990–1992
- Preceded by: Position established
- Succeeded by: Tony Anenih

Secretary of the Constituent Assembly
- In office 1988–1989
- Appointed by: Ibrahim Babangida
- Chairman: Anthony Aniagolu
- Deputy Chairman: Muhammadu Buba Ardo

Permanent Secretary of the Special Services Office
- In office 1986–1988
- Appointed by: Ibrahim Babangida
- Preceded by: Sa'idu Gwarzo
- Succeeded by: Bukar Usman

Nigerian Ambassador to Pakistan
- In office 1984–1987
- Appointed by: Muhammadu Buhari

Nigerian Ambassador to Greece and Cyprus
- In office 1981–1984
- Appointed by: Shehu Shagari

Principal Secretary to the President of Nigeria
- In office 1976–1981
- President: Olusegun Obasanjo; Shehu Shagari

Principal Political Secretary, Supreme Military Headquarters
- In office 1976–1981
- Chief of Staff: Shehu Yar'Adua

Personal details
- Born: 25 June 1945 (age 81) Borno, Northern Region, British Nigeria (now Borno State, Nigeria)
- Party: All Progressives Congress (2015–present)
- Other political affiliations: Peoples Front of Nigeria (1988–89); Social Democratic Party (1989–1993); Peoples Democratic Party (2006–2015)
- Spouse: Ireti Kingibe
- Education: Bishop's Stortford College
- Alma mater: University of Sussex; Graduate Institute of International and Development Studies
- Occupation: Politician
- Profession: Diplomat

Babagana Kingibe OV GCON (born 25 June 1945) is a Nigerian diplomat, politician and civil servant who has held several high ranking government offices, culminating in his appointment as the Secretary to the Government of the Federation from 2007 to 2008. He spent over a decade in the Foreign Service cadre and has been in politics since the 1970s, serving six heads of state; most recently as a member of the inner circle of President Muhammadu Buhari.

In 1993, he was the vice-presidential running mate to Chief Moshood Abiola in the annulled 1993 presidential election, before later joining the government in service of military dictator General Sani Abacha. He was a member of his politico-military caucus as Minister of Foreign Affairs from 1993 to 1995, Minister of Internal Affairs from 1995 to 1997; and later Minister of Power and Steel from 1997 to 1998.

== Early years ==
Kingibe was born on 25 June 1945 in Borno to a Kanuri family. His mother, Ya Kingi Mallam died when he was four years old. His father, Mustafa Shuwa was a shoemaker who later became the clerk of the Borno Native Authority.

Kingibe grew up in Maiduguri and attended primary schools there. In 1958, he was admitted into the Borno Provincial Secondary School. In 1960, he left for the United Kingdom on a government scholarship to complete his O'Level and A-level at Bishop's Stortford College. In 1968, he received a bachelor's degree in international relations from the University of Sussex (alongside Thabo Mbeki), before proceeding to the BBC Television Training School. Kingibe later pursued postgraduate studies at the Graduate Institute of International and Development Studies in Switzerland but left before receiving his degree.

In 1969, he returned to Nigeria where he taught political science at the Ahmadu Bello University in Zaria. At the university, he became acquainted with the Kaduna Mafia, a group of young western-educated intellectuals, civil servants and military officers from Northern Nigeria. Kingibe left the university towards the end of the Nigerian Civil War, being employed by the Broadcasting Corporation of Northern Nigeria (now Federal Radio Corporation of Nigeria) as head of current affairs and features department.

== Early diplomatic career ==
In 1972, he joined the Nigerian Foreign Service as an external affairs officer. His first posting was the Nigerian High Commission in London as a senior political counsellor and later became the head of the political desk. Following the 1976 Nigerian coup d'état attempt, Kingibe was seconded to the Supreme Military Headquarters (SMHQ) as the Principal Political Secretary serving under military triumvir General Shehu Yar'Adua from 1976 to 1979, where he was involved in the planning of the military's transfer of power programme: states creation and national delimitation, local government reforms and the constitutional drafting committee of the Second Nigerian Republic.

He simultaneously served as the Principal Political Secretary in the Office of the President between 1976 and 1981, serving both General Olusegun Obasanjo and President Shehu Shagari. In 1981, at the age of 36, he was appointed the Nigerian Ambassador to Greece and Cyprus serving from 1981 to 1984; and later served as Nigerian Ambassador to Pakistan. In 1986, military president General Ibrahim Babangida appointed Kingibe as Permanent Secretary of Special Services, overseeing the activities of security and intelligence services; and liaising with the military presidency. He later served as the Secretary of the Constituent Assembly from 1988 to 1989.

== Political career ==
=== Party politics ===
Kingibe entered party politics in the build-up to the transition of the Third Nigerian Republic. In 1988, he was made director of organization of the People's Front of Nigeria (PFN) which consisted of politicians such as Atiku Abubakar, Bola Tinubu, Abdullahi Aliyu Sumaila and Rabiu Kwankwaso, which was then led by Shehu Musa Yar'Adua. The front later joined with the Social Democratic Party (SDP) in 1989.

During the conduct of elections for national executive positions in the party, Kingibe was sponsored by the People's Front faction of SDP as the party's chairman, a position he went on to clinch. As party chairman, Kingibe was involved in the organization of party's gubernatorial and presidential primaries in 1991 and 1992 respectively. After the cancellations of the 1992 presidential primaries in which Shehu Yar'Adua emerged as a candidate, Kingibe put himself forward as presidential candidate.

=== 1993 presidential election ===
Utilizing his chairmanship over the party, Kingibe made a split from the Shehu Yar'Adua led People's Front group, using his relationship with SDP governors and state party chairmen to build his presidential campaign. The results after the first ballot of the presidential primaries held in Jos was: Moshood Abiola with 3,617 votes, Kingibe with 3,255 votes and Atiku Abubakar with 2,066 votes. Coming in second, Kingibe considered joining forces with Atiku Abubakar combining 5,231 votes to challenge Abiola. However, after much prodding Shehu Yar'Adua asked Atiku Abubakar to withdraw from the campaign, with Abiola promising to make him his running mate. Unable to join with Atiku Abubakar, Abiola was later pressured by SDP governors to select Kinigbe as his Vice-presidential running mate, creating a Muslim-Muslim ticket which was initially thought to be a deal breaker in the elections.

The results though not officially declared by the National Electoral Commission – showed the duo of Moshood Abiola and Babagana Kingibe of the Social Democratic Party (SDP) defeated Bashir Tofa and Slyvester Ugoh of the National Republican Convention (NRC) by over 2.3 million votes in the 1993 presidential election. The elections were later annulled by military head of state General Ibrahim Babangida, citing electoral irregularities. The annulment led to widespread protests and political unrest in Abiola's stronghold of the South West, which led to the resignation of General Babangida and the emergence of the weak Interim National Government led by Ernest Shonekan. As interim president, Shonekan initially appointed Abiola as his Vice President, who refused to recognize the interim government, the crisis lingered on culminating in the seizure of power of General Sani Abacha.

=== Political assignments since 1993 ===
Since 1993, Kingibe has served in successive military and civilian governments. In 1993, Kingibe joined the military regime of General Sani Abacha serving as: Minister of Foreign Affairs from 1993 to 1995, Minister of Internal Affairs from 1995 to 1997, and Minister of Power and Steel from 1997 to 1998. Following the death of Abacha, his successor General Abdulsalami Abubakar dissolved the cabinet and Kingibe was out of government to undergo postgraduate studies at the Graduate Institute of International and Development Studies in Geneva, before later leaving his studies to return to diplomatic service.

Kingibe served from October 2002 to September 2006 as the Special Envoy of the African Union to Sudan and subsequently Special Representative of the Chairperson of the African Union Commission and head of the African Union Mission in Sudan (AMIS). In September 2006, Kingibe returned to Nigeria and joined the Peoples Democratic Party ahead of the 2007 presidential election won by Umaru Yar'Adua, it was widely believed that Kingibe considered running for the presidency, before later joining the Yar'Adua administration.

In June 2007, he was appointed Secretary to the Government of the Federation. In September 2008, with the onset of Yar'Adua's subsequent illness and first hospitalization in Saudi Arabia, Kingibe was unceremoniously removed from office for allegedly plotting with General Abdullahi Mohammed to remove Yar'Adua from power due to his poor health. Following his removal from office, Kingibe maintained a low profile and later became critical of President Goodluck Jonathan's for his inability to suppress the insurgency in the North-East.

After the 2015 presidential election won by Muhammadu Buhari, Kingibe was appointed a member of Buhari's inauguration committee. Since then, he has gone on to feature prominently alongside Abba Kyari as a powerful behind the scenes decision-maker – shaping the administrations intelligence and foreign policy. In February 2018, Kingibe denied campaigning for the 2019 presidential election. In June 2018, President Muhammadu Buhari recognized June 12 as Democracy Day and awarded Kingibe the second highest national honour of the Grand Commander of the Order of the Niger. On 31 May 2021, Kingibe was appointed by President Muhammadu Buhari to his cabinet as Special Envoy on Chad and the Lake Chad Region.

== Honours ==
=== National honours ===
Country	Decoration	Presenter	Notes
Nigeria	Grand Commander of the Order of the Niger (GCON);	President Muhammadu Buhari	Second highest national honour in Nigeria.

=== Foreign honours ===
Country	Decoration	Presenter	Notes
Cameroon	Officer of the Order of Valour (OV);	President Paul Biya	National honour in Cameroon. Awarded for high services to the State.

== See also ==
- Minister of Foreign Affairs (Nigeria)
