= The Supreme Price =

2014 documentary film by Joanna Lipper

- Directed by: Joanna Lipper
- Written by: Joanna Lipper
- Produced by: Joanna Lipper
- Starring: Hafsat Abiola
- Cinematography: Richard Sands; Lisa Rinzler; Joanna Lipper
- Edited by: Geoffrey Richman; Tina Grapenthin; Ali Muney
- Music by: Nathan Larson
- Production companies: Vertumnus Productions; Mainframe Productions
- Distributed by: Women Make Movies (North America)
- Release date: 2014
- Running time: 75 minutes
- Countries: United States; Nigeria
- Language: English

The Supreme Price is a 2014 documentary film produced and directed by Joanna Lipper. It traces the development of Nigeria's pro-democracy movement through the story of women's-rights activist Hafsat Abiola, the daughter of M. K. O. Abiola and Kudirat Abiola.

The film examines the aftermath of the annulled 1993 Nigerian presidential election, which M. K. O. Abiola was widely regarded as having won. After he was arrested, Kudirat Abiola became a leader in the pro-democracy movement, organising strikes and demonstrations against military rule. She was assassinated in Lagos in 1996. Through the history of the Abiola family, the film addresses military dictatorship, political repression, gender inequality and women's participation in Nigerian public life.

The Supreme Price won the Gucci Tribeca Spotlighting Women Documentary Award and Best Documentary at the Africa International Film Festival. It was nominated for the Grierson Award for Best Historical Documentary and the Africa Movie Academy Award for Best Documentary.

== Synopsis ==
The documentary places the Abiola family's story in the context of Nigeria's political history from independence through military rule and the return to civilian government. In 1993, M. K. O. Abiola was widely regarded as the winner of the presidential election, but the result was annulled before he could take office. After his arrest and imprisonment, his wife Kudirat became a prominent figure in the pro-democracy movement, organising rallies and advocating for democratic rule and human rights. She was assassinated in Lagos in 1996. M. K. O. Abiola died in detention in 1998, shortly before his expected release.

The story is told from the perspective of Hafsat Abiola, who was studying at Harvard University when her mother was killed. After the deaths of both parents, she continued her activism concerning democracy, accountable government and women's participation in public life. The film follows her return to Nigeria and her efforts to challenge patriarchal political structures while carrying forward her parents' legacy.

The documentary includes interviews with figures including Nobel laureate Wole Soyinka, former United States ambassadors to Nigeria Walter C. Carrington and John Campbell, and Nigerian human-rights activist Josephine Okei-Odumakin.

== Production ==
The Supreme Price was produced and directed by Joanna Lipper. Nigerian filmmaker Tunde Kelani served as co-producer. The film was produced by Vertumnus Productions and co-produced by Mainframe Productions. Principal photography took place in Nigeria, including Lagos and Ogun State.

The production received support from the MacArthur Foundation, Ford Foundation, Independent Television Service (ITVS), Chicken & Egg Pictures and the Gucci Tribeca Documentary Fund. Women Make Movies handled North American distribution.

== Release ==
The film screened at festivals and events including the Human Rights Watch Film Festival, AFI Docs, Raindance Film Festival, Film Africa and the Aspen Ideas Festival. It was also presented as part of the United Nations' Ciné-ONU film series in Europe.

An extended trailer for the film was commissioned for the launch of Gucci's Chime for Change campaign at TED 2013.

== Reception ==
Anita Gates of The New York Times described the documentary as an accessible family drama about Nigeria's recent history. Kenneth Turan of the Los Angeles Times called it a "strong, forthright documentary" and discussed the political cost borne by the Abiola family. In Variety, Ella Taylor highlighted the film's treatment of women's role in Nigerian political and social reform.

The Guardian included The Supreme Price in a list of five notable political films in African cinema, describing it as an account of Nigeria's pro-democracy movement and efforts to increase women's participation in leadership.

== Awards and nominations ==
Awards and nominations received by The Supreme Price
Award or festival	Category	Result	Ref.
Gucci Tribeca Documentary Fund	Spotlighting Women Documentary Award	Won	
Africa International Film Festival	Best Documentary	Won	
Grierson Awards	Best Historical Documentary	Nominated	
Africa Movie Academy Awards	Best Documentary	Nominated	

== Themes ==
The film explores the relationship between democracy, gender and political power in Nigeria. It examines the legacy of military dictatorship, the personal cost of political activism and the role of women in movements for democratic reform. Reviewers noted its focus on women's political leadership, particularly through Hafsat and Kudirat Abiola.
