= MKO Abiola Park =

Public park in Lagos, Nigeria

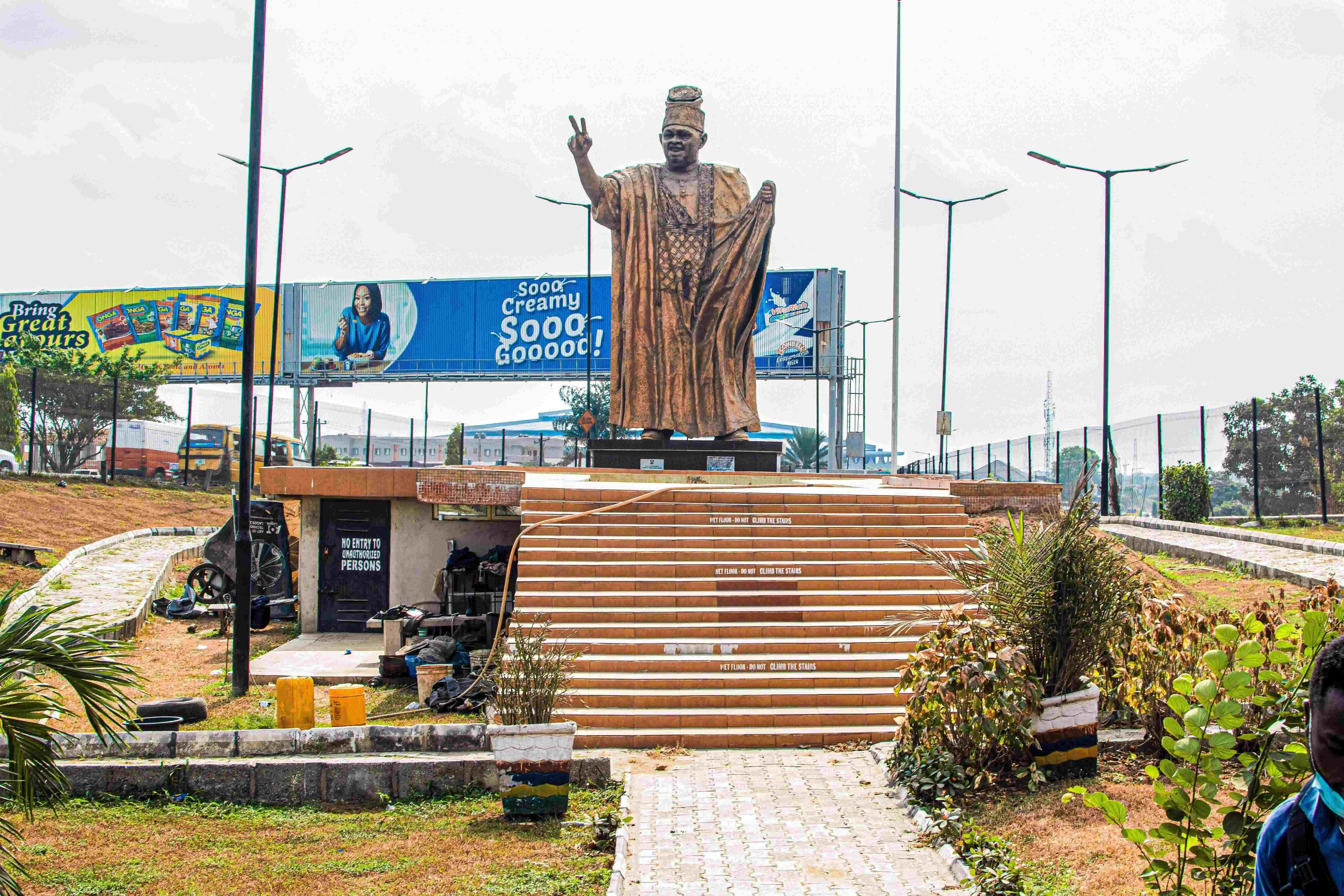
- A statue of Nigerian Politician and Philanthropist MKO Abiola.
- Interactive map of MKO Abiola Park
- Coordinates: 6°35′30″N 3°23′02″E

The MKO Abiola Park is a public park located at the Ikododu Road - Lagos/Ibadan Expressway Interchange in Ojota, Lagos. The green space was named after the Late Nigerian Politician and Philanthropist MKO Abiola.

== Description ==
The park has a wide green landscape, some monuments and seats for relaxation. In June 2018, a 14 metre/46 feet statue of MKO Abiola was situated in the park to honor his cause.

== Gallery ==
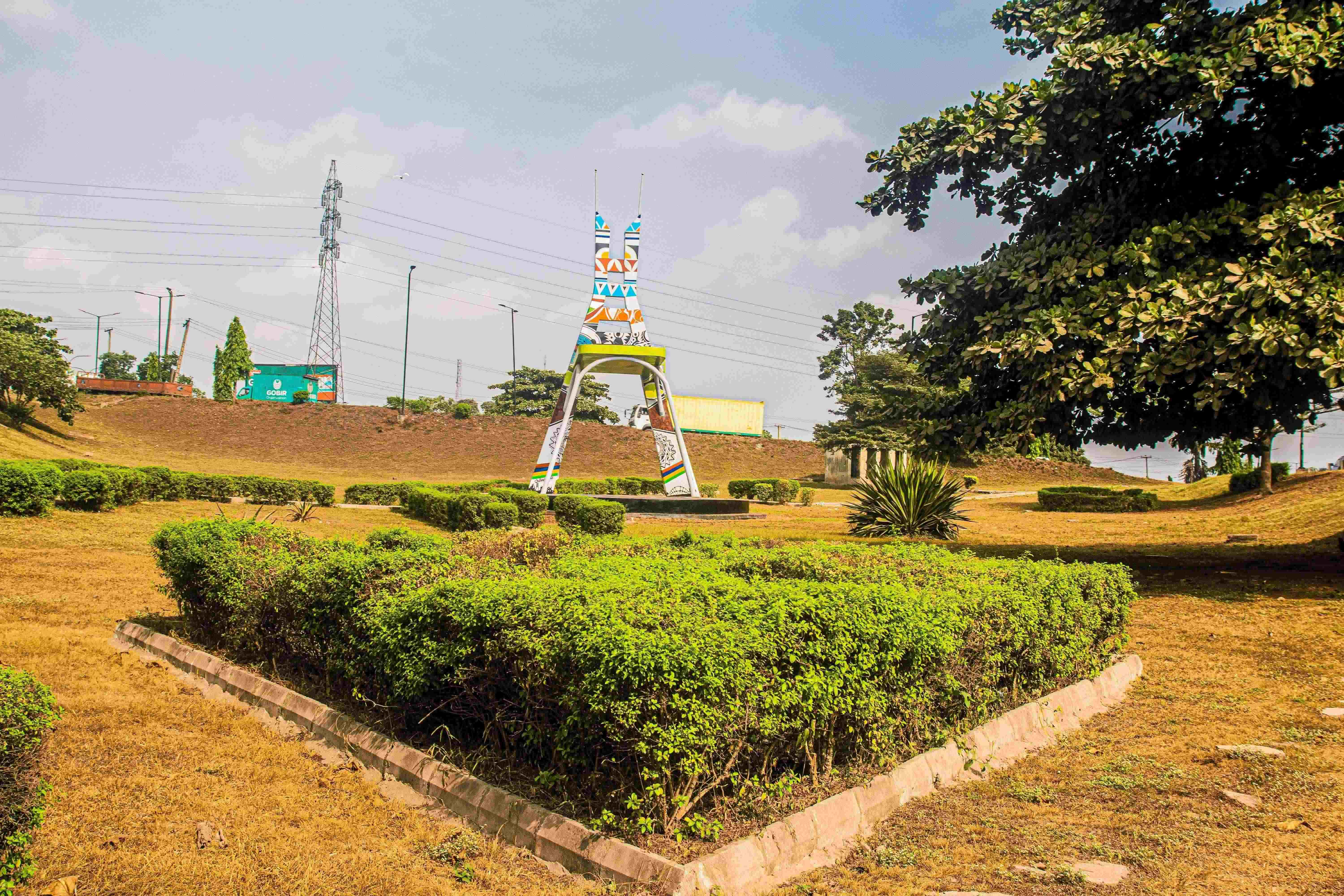

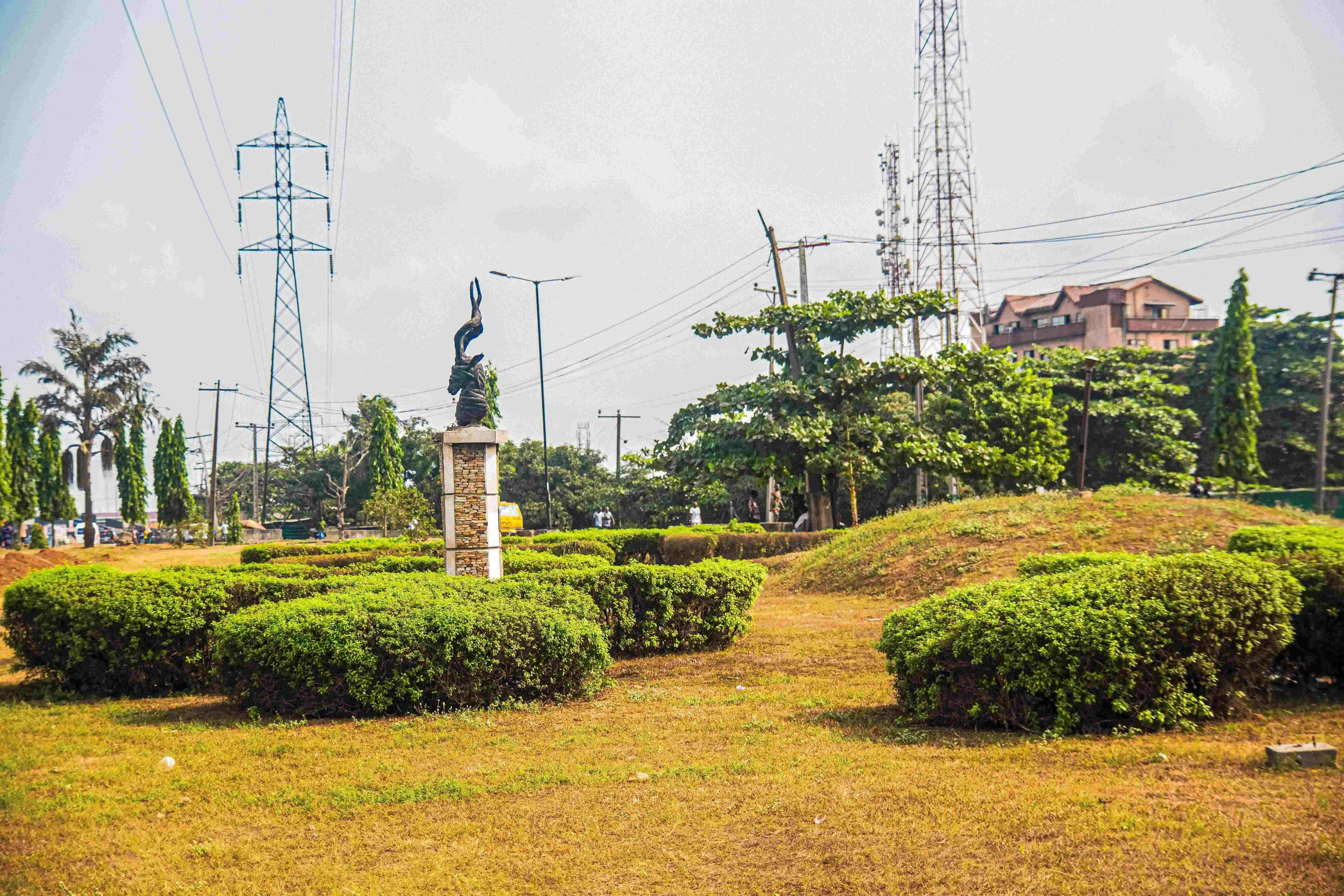
