= Ugoh =

Ugoh is a surname. Notable people with the surname include:

- Sylvester Ugoh (born 1931), Nigerian politician
- Tony Ugoh (born 1983), American football player
