= Biafran pound =

Currency of the former Nigerian secessionist state

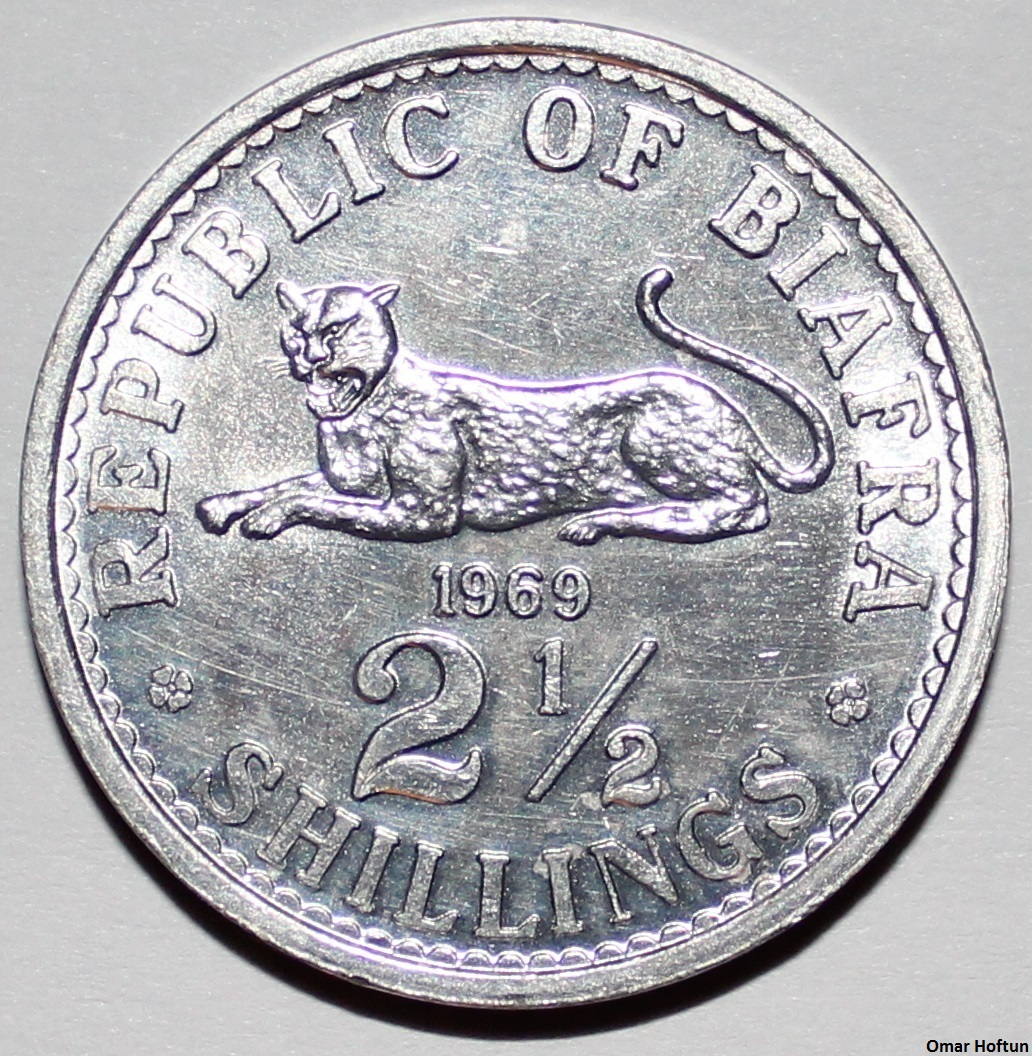
Biafran 2 1/2 shilling coin from 1969; aluminium, reverse.
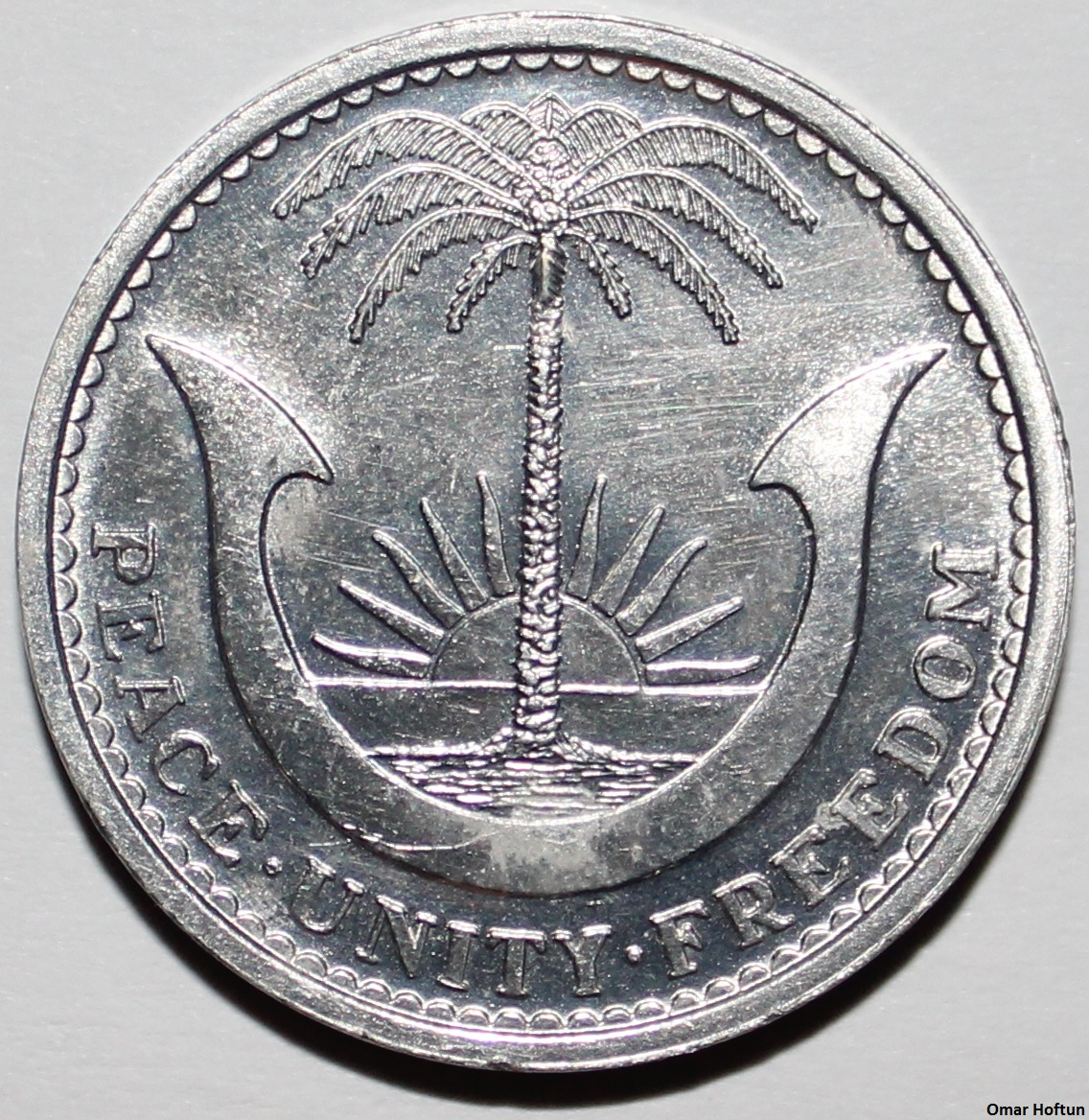
Biafran 2 1/2 shilling coin from 1969; aluminium, obverse.

Unit
- Symbol: £

Denominations
- Subunit
- ^{1}/_{20}: shilling
- ^{1}/_{240}: penny
- Plural
- penny: pence
- Symbol
- shilling: s or /–
- penny: d
- Banknotes: 5/–, 10/–, £1, £5, £10
- Coins: 3d, 6d, 1/–, 2/6

Demographics
- Date of introduction: 29 January 1968
- Replaced: Nigerian pound
- Date of withdrawal: 1970
- Replaced by: Nigerian pound
- User(s): Biafra; Republic of Benin (1967)

Issuance
- Central bank: Bank of Biafra
- This infobox shows the latest status before this currency was rendered obsolete.

The pound (symbol £) was the currency of the breakaway Republic of Biafra between 1968 and 1970.

== Context ==
The Republic of Biafra existed from 1967 to 1970 as an independent state between Nigeria and Cameroon. The central bank of Biafra was one of the first institutions created. It was then decided to maintain the Nigerian pound. The young Republic relied heavily on foreign exchange for cash, which turned into a risky venture.

On 27 January 1968, Biafran President General C. Odumegwu Ojukwu declared:

"Fellow countrymen, I am happy to announce to you that I have today signed a decree introducing Biafran currency notes which will be the legal tender throughout the Republic of Biafra. By that same decree, Nigeria currency notes will cease to be legal tender in Biafra. Our new currency notes, along with our new postage stamps, will be issued to the public on January 29, 1968."

The first notes, in denominations of 5/– and £1, were introduced on January 29, 1968. A series of coins was issued in 1969; 3d, 6d, 1/–, and 2s 6d coins were minted, all struck in aluminium. In February 1969, a second family of notes was issued in denominations of 5/– and 10/–, £1, £5 and £10. Despite not being recognised currency by the rest of the world when issued, the banknotes were afterwards sold as curios (typically at an eighth of their face value, or 2/6 sterling for Biafran £1) in British notaphily shops. The notes are now traded among banknote collectors at well above their original nominal value.

The most commonly found notes are the 1968 and 1969 £1 notes, with the £10 note and all coins being rare.

All banknotes issued by the Bank of Biafra are undated, though the dates of issuance are known. All notes bear the signature of bank Governor Sylvester Ugoh and Director William Uzoaga.

Banknotes of the Biafran pound (1968 "First" issue)
Value	Obverse	Reverse	Issue date	Size	Prefixes
5/–	Palm tree over a rising sun	Four Biafran girls	29 Jan 1968	110 x 55 mm	A/O - A/P
£1	Palm tree over a rising sun	Coat of arms of Biafra	29 Jan 1968	140 x 70 mm	A/A - A/D

Banknotes of the Biafran pound (1969 "Second" issue)
Value	Obverse	Reverse	Issue date	Size	Prefixes
5/–	Palm tree over a rising sun	Four Biafran girls	Feb 1969	110 x 55 mm	MA - NR
10/–	Palm tree over a rising sun	Oil refinery	Feb 1969	125 x 60 mm	GA - GW
£1	Palm tree over a rising sun	Coat of arms of Biafra	Feb 1969	140 x 70 mm	BA - DX
£5	Palm tree over a rising sun	A female weaver; coat of arms	Feb 1969	145 x 75 mm	WA - WF
£10	Palm tree over a rising sun	A male carver; coat of arms	Feb 1969	155 x 80 mm	ZA - ZC

== See also ==
- Nigerian pound
- Nigerian naira
- Postage stamps and postal history of Biafra
