= Kudirat Abiola =

Nigerian politician's assassinated wife and activist

Alhaja Kudirat Abiola CFR
- Abiola in 1994 (colorized)
- Born: Kudirat Olayinka Adeyemi; 1951; Zaria, Nigeria
- Died: 4 June 1996 (aged 44–45); Lagos, Nigeria
- Cause of death: Assassination by firearm
- Spouse: Moshood Abiola
- Children: 7 (including Hafsat Abiola)

Alhaja Kudirat Abiola (born Kudirat Olayinka Adeyemi) CFR, popularly known simply as Kudirat Abiola (1951 – 4 June 1996), was a Nigerian pro-democracy campaigner. She was assassinated whilst her husband, Moshood Abiola, was being detained by the Nigerian Government. He was the winning candidate in elections that had taken place in Nigeria in 1993 and was arrested shortly after they were summarily annulled by the ruling junta.

== Life ==
Kudirat Olayinka Adeyemi was born in 1951 in Zaria in Nigeria. Alhaja Kudirat Abiola was the second woman to have married her husband. At the time of her death, she was his senior wife.

== Assassination ==
Abiola was assassinated while her husband was being detained by the Nigerian Government. Her husband was believed to have been the winning candidate in the Nigerian elections that had taken place in 1993, and he was arrested shortly after they were annulled by the government of the dictator Ibrahim Babangida. The killing was the subject of an investigation and trial many years later. According to accounts, the murder was ordered and then carried out by six men. Kudirat Abiola died in her car from machine gun fire. Her driver also died. Her personal assistant, who was later accused of being involved with her assassins, was in the car but was not hurt.

== Aftermath ==
Her husband continued to be detained without charge after her death. He died in suspicious circumstances just before it was said that he was to be released on 7 July 1998.

== Legacy ==
At the time of her death an anti-military rule "Radio Democracy" had just been created and it was based in Norway. It was backed by the American, British, Swedish, Danish and Norwegian governments to help end military dictatorship in Nigeria. The Radio station's name was changed to Radio Kudirat.

In 1998 a street corner in New York was renamed Kudirat Abiola Corner, despite protests by the Nigerian Government.

In October 1998 Major Hamza Al-Mustapha appeared in court with the previous President Abacha's son Mohammed, charged with the murder of Kudirat Abiola. Numerous others would be charged with having roles in Abiola's death as well, including Rabo Lawal, the head of Aso Rock's Mobile Police Force Unit. At the trial the self-confessed killer, Sergeant Barnabas Jabila, said he was obeying orders from his superior, Hamza Al-Mustapha. Fellow Abiola assassin Muhammad Abdul, who drove the car which trailed Aboila, also testified that her assassination was carried out on orders of al-Mustapha, and also that Mohammad Abacha directed him to join the assassination squad, with Alhaji Lateef Sofolahan providing information to five gunmen on her whereabouts. Alhaji Lateef Sofolahan, who was previously a campaign protocol officer with Moshood Abiola’s 1993 presidential campaign organisation, also admitted in 2011 to being an informant for the Abacha regime.

In July 2011, Rabo, who was acquitted of having a role in Abiola's death, was released from prison after being jailed for 13 years. On 30 June 2012 Hamza Al-Mustapha and Alhaji Lateef Shofolahan were sentenced to be hanged for the murder of Alhaja Kudirat Abiola. Al Mustapha had been a Presidential Chief security officer whilst Shofolahan had been his victim's personal assistant. The two were later released on appeal by a court in Lagos. Others who were jailed on suspicion of roles in Abiola's assassination would be eventually released without receiving convictions as well.

Abiola remains a symbol of Nigeria's struggle for democracy. Nineteen years after her death there were demonstrations at her graveside. A documentary, "The Supreme Price" details the story of how both Abiola and her husband paid a terrible cost in their quest for a better, freer Nigeria. It was directed by Joanna Lipper, a lecturer at Harvard University, who tells the story from her daughter, Hafsat's perspective. The documentary also includes interviews with Walter Carrington, former U.S. ambassador to Nigeria, and Nobel Prize-winning writer Wole Soyinka.
