= Bank of Biafra =

Defunct central bank

The Bank of Biafra was the central bank of The Republic of Biafra. It was established on 30 May 1967, under Decree No. 30 of 1967 by Biafran president Odumegwu Ojukwu. It was headed by a governor and a board of four directors; the first governor and only was Sylvester Ugoh. The Bank issued its first notes of the Biafran pound being £1 and 5/- on 27 January 1967 in a speech announced by Biafran president Odumegwu Ojukwu in Umuahia, the Biafran capital. On 28 January 1969, Biafra issued its first coins of 3d, 6d, 1/-, and 2-1/2/-. Again in February 1969, the Bank of Biafra redesigned the £1 and 5/- notes and issued new notes being 10/-, £5, £10.
