= Akasoba Duke-Abiola =

Nigerian professor, human rights activist and peace and conflict-resolution advocate

- Citizenship: Nigeria
- Occupations: Lawyer, academic, human rights activist
- Organization(s): Akasoba Centre for Peace and Conflict Resolution (ACPCR)
- Known for: Peace and conflict resolution; Human Rights
- Spouse: Moshood Abiola

Akasoba Duke-Abiola is a Nigerian law professor, human rights activist and peace and conflict-resolution advocate. She is the chairperson of the Akasoba Centre for Peace and Conflict Resolution (ACPCR) and is also known by the traditional title Akasoba of Kalabari. In 2014, she sought the presidential nomination of the Peoples Democratic Party (PDP) for the 2015 Nigerian general election In August 2026, the African Policy and Research Consortium endorsed her for the position of Secretary-General of the United Nations

== Career ==
Duke-Abiola has worked on peacebuilding and conflict-resolution efforts through the Akasoba Centre for Peace and Conflict Resolution. In July 2013, the centre invited Nigerian political leaders, including President Goodluck Jonathan and Rivers State Governor Rotimi Amaechi, to a peace meeting concerning the political crisis in Rivers State. Former Nigerian Head of State Yakubu Gowon, former President of Zambia Kenneth Kaunda and former United Nations Secretary-General Boutros Boutros-Ghali were also invited.

In 2013, Duke-Abiola spoke at the Global Women Arise Forum in Melbourne, Australia, where she criticised advocacy for child marriage and called on the Sultan of Sokoto to caution Senator Sani Yerima.

In 2022, she participated in the World Youth Summit for Peace organised by the International Human Rights Commission in Pakistan, where she spoke about kidnapping, banditry, terrorism and other forms of violence.

== Political activities ==
Akasoba is a founding member of the Peoples Democratic Party (PDP).

She sought the presidential nomination of the Peoples Democratic Party ahead of the 2015 Nigerian general election. In October 2014, she said that she had paid the required amount for the presidential nomination and expression-of-interest forms but was not given the forms by the party. She filed a suit at the Federal High Court in Abuja seeking, among other reliefs, an order restraining the Independent National Electoral Commission (INEC) from accepting a presidential nomination from the PDP.

== Human rights and peace advocacy ==
Duke-Abiola has advocated for peace, conflict resolution and human rights. In 2013, as chairperson of the Akasoba Centre for Peace and Conflict Resolution (ACPCR), she supported initiatives aimed at addressing political tensions in Rivers State and promoting dialogue among political and traditional leaders. In 2022, she addressed the World Youth Summit for Peace and called for stronger international action against terrorism, kidnapping and other forms of violence.

== Academic work ==
In 2025, Akasoba co-authored a paper on cloud-seeding technology and its potential influence on food security in Nigeria. The paper was published in the International Journal of Social Science, Management, Peace and Conflict Research and lists her affiliation as the Department of Security and Strategic Studies, Nasarawa State University, Keffi.

== 2026 United Nations Secretary-General candidacy ==
In August 2026, the African Policy and Research Consortium endorsed Duke-Abiola as a candidate for the position of Secretary-General of the United Nations.

== Personal life ==
Akasoba is the widow of Nigerian businessman and politician Moshood Abiola.
