= Bello Suleiman =

Minister of Power and Steel
- In office 1998–1999
- President: Abdulsalami Abubakar
- Preceded by: Baba Gana Kingibe
- Succeeded by: Bola Ige

Personal details
- Born: 16 June 1952 (age 74) Gusau, Northern Region, British Nigeria (now Gusau, Nigeria)
- Education: Ahmadu Bello University
- Profession: Engineer

Bello Suleiman (born 16 June 1952) is a Nigerian engineer who was the Minister of Power and Steel from 1997 to 1998.

== Biography ==
Suleiman was born and educated in Gusau. He attended Nagarta College in Sokoto from 1966 to 1970, before studying engineering from 1971 to 1975 at the Ahmadu Bello University in Zaria and University of Birmingham from 1977 to 1978. He worked as an engineer in the Sokoto State civil service rising through the ranks in the Ministry of Works: work workshop engineer from 1978 to 1979; chief mechanical/electrical engineer from 1979 to 1980. From 1980 to 1981 he was deputy director, physical planning, at the Usman Danfodiyo University and later director of physical planning from 1981 to 1986. He was the deputy general manager at the Cement Company of Northern Nigeria Plc. from 1986 to 1987; and managing director from 1987 to 1992. He was a director of Industrial Management and Engineering Services Limited in Kaduna from 1992 to 1998. He was appointed Federal Minister of Power and Steel serving in the government of General Abdulsalami Abubakar from 1998 to 1999. After leaving office he became a board director of Savannah Bank Plc, and later became vice chairman and managing director of Power Holding Company of Nigeria Plc, he was removed in 2009 by President Umaru Yar'Adua.
