= MKO Abiola Statue =

Monumental structure erected in memory of Moshood Abiola

Coordinates: 6°35′30″N 3°23′02″E

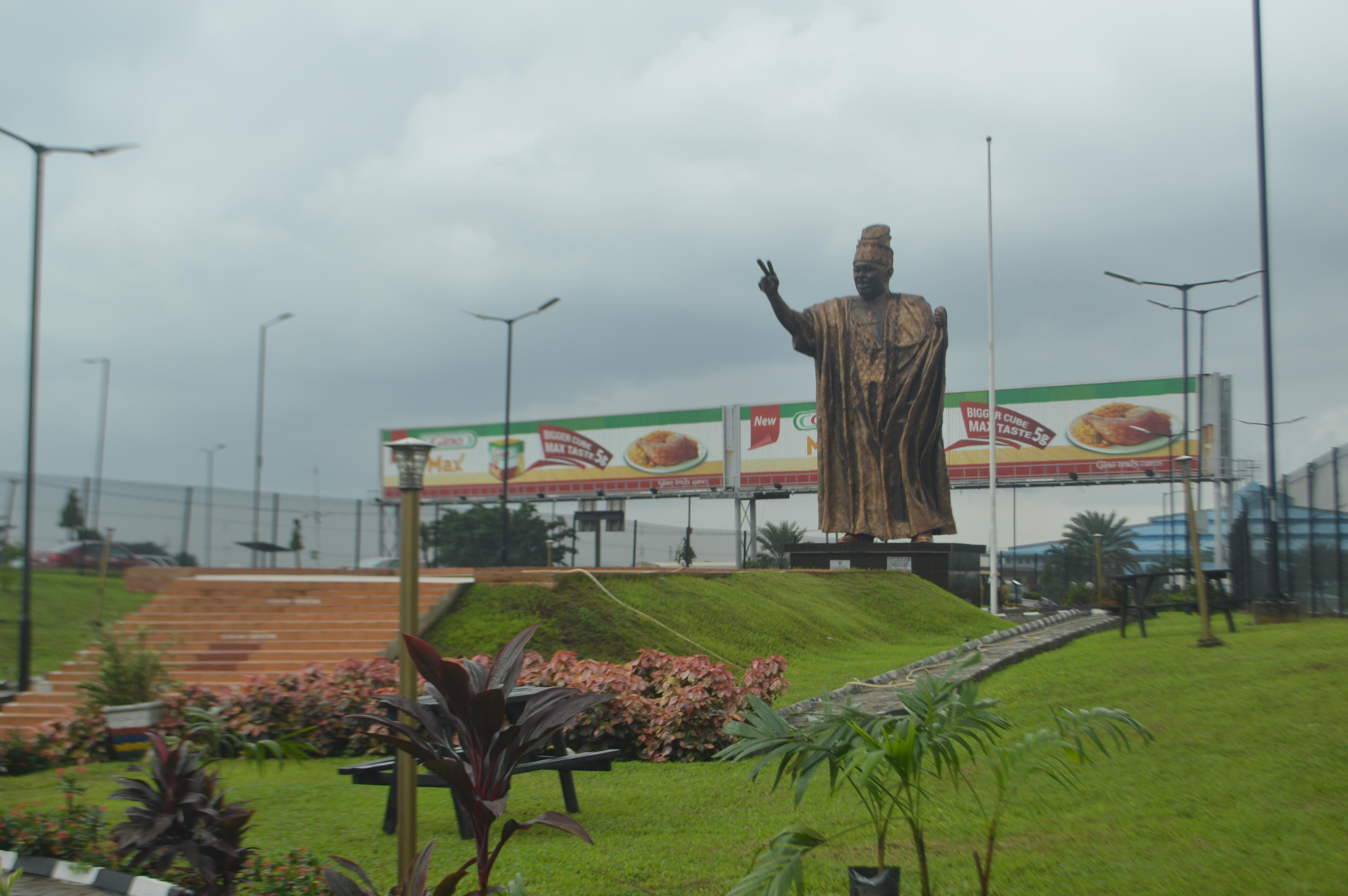
- Artist: Olurotimi Ajayi
- Year: 12 June 2018
- Type: Statue
- Medium: Fiberglass; marble; bronze
- Location: Ojota, Ikeja, Lagos State, Nigeria
- Owner: Lagos State Government

The MKO Abiola Statue was designed and erected by Olurotimi Ajayi in memory of Chief Moshood Abiola, a politician who was widely regarded as the winner of the inconclusive 1993 Nigerian elections. Standing at about 14 m (46 ft) tall, the statue was unveiled on 12 June 2018 during the administration of Governor Akinwunmi Ambode.

== Background ==
Moshood Kashimawo Olawale Abiola, popularly referred to as MKO Abiola (24 August 1937 – 7 July 1998) was a businessman, publisher and politician. He contested for the presidency at the 1993 Nigeria elections and was widely regarded as the winner although the final results weren't released. In 1994, he was arrested and detained in prison on charges of treason after declaring himself as the President of Nigeria. MKO Abiola died on 7 July 1998, the day he was due to be released from prison. His death was trailed by suspicious circumstances, while an official autopsy stated that Abiola died of heart attack, General Sani Abacha's Chief Security Officer said Abiola was beaten to death.

== Purpose ==
In remembrance of the life, exploits and legacy set by Abiola, the Lagos state government through governor Akinwunmi Ambode unveiled the MKO Abiola Statue on 12 June 2018 – exactly twenty-five years after he won 12 June 1993 presidential election – in Ojota, a suburb of Lagos. The governor said the statue would remain a memorial of Abiola's legacy and the greatness that he represented to Nigeria's political landscape.

== Structural description ==
Located at the heart of the "MKO Gardens" and standing 11 m (37 ft) tall, the MKO Abiola Statue is mounted on a 2.7 m (9 ft) pedestal making it a 14 m (46 ft) high monument. The sculpture – made of fiberglass – shows a smiling Abiola wearing a flowing agbada with his right hand raised showing the sign of peace. The MKO Abiola Statue was first designed in 2003 before it was re-designed to its current state.

== Image gallery ==
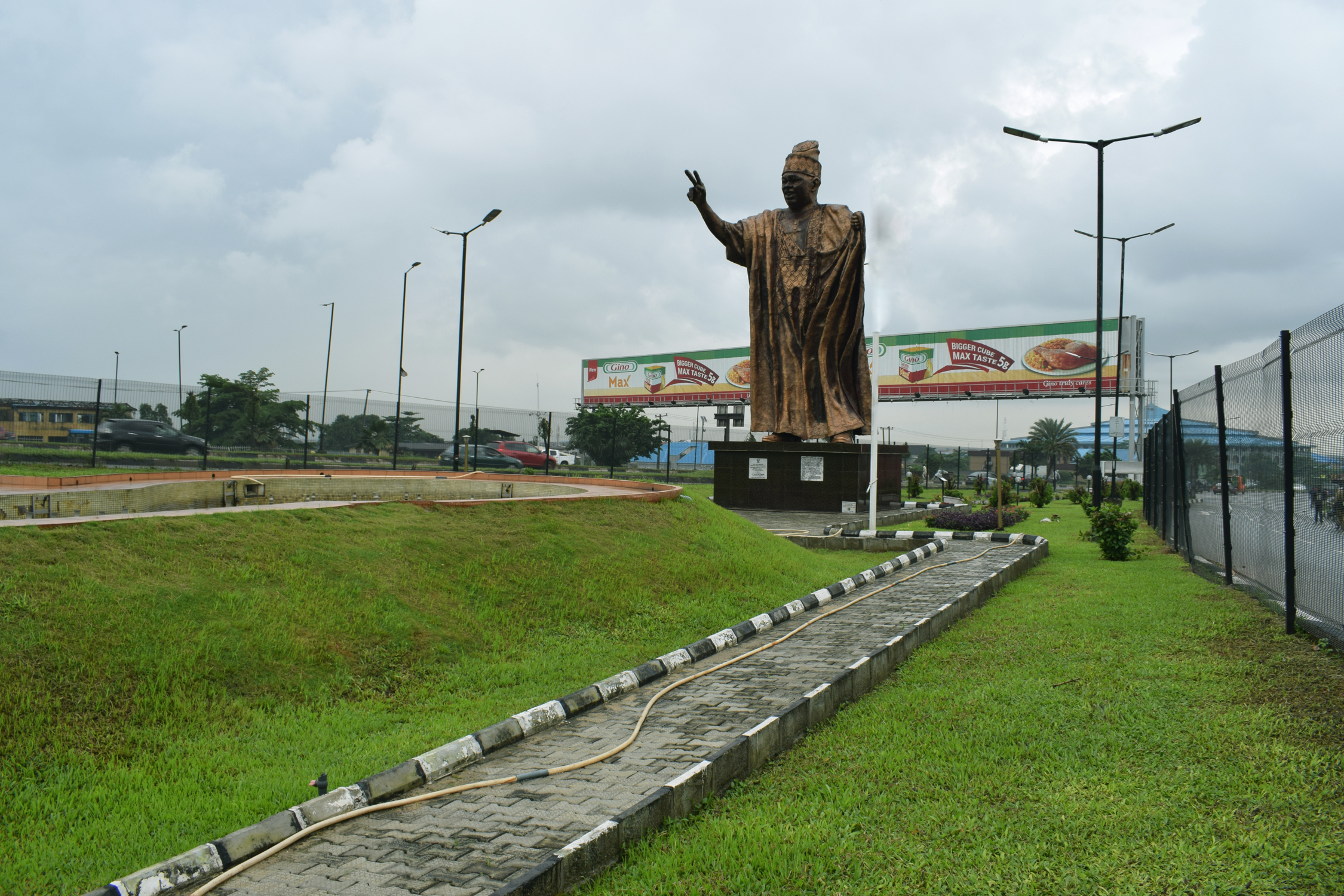
A wide view of the Statue of Chief M.K.O Abiola in Abiola Gardens, Ojota, Lagos-Nigeria

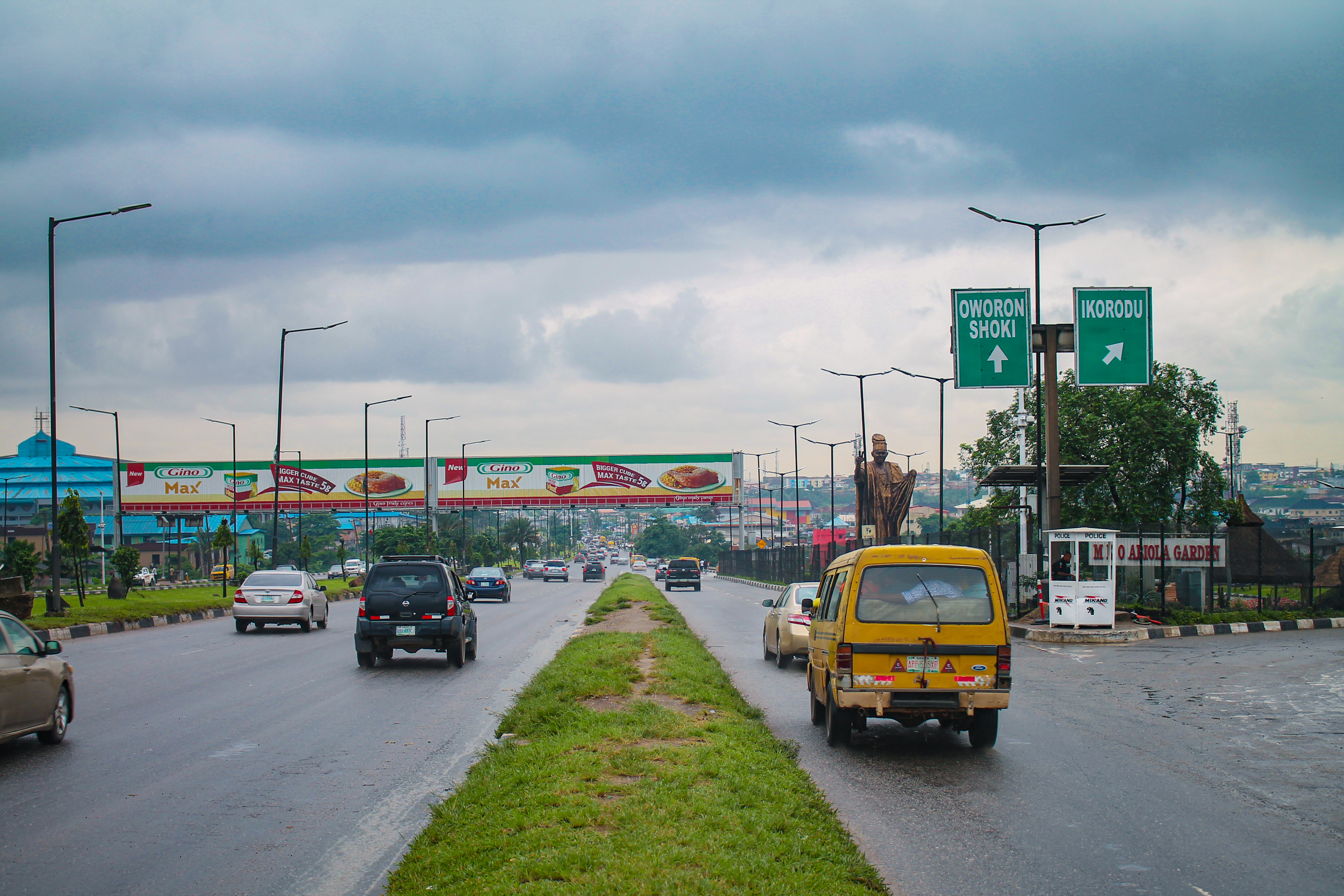
MKO Abiola Gaden

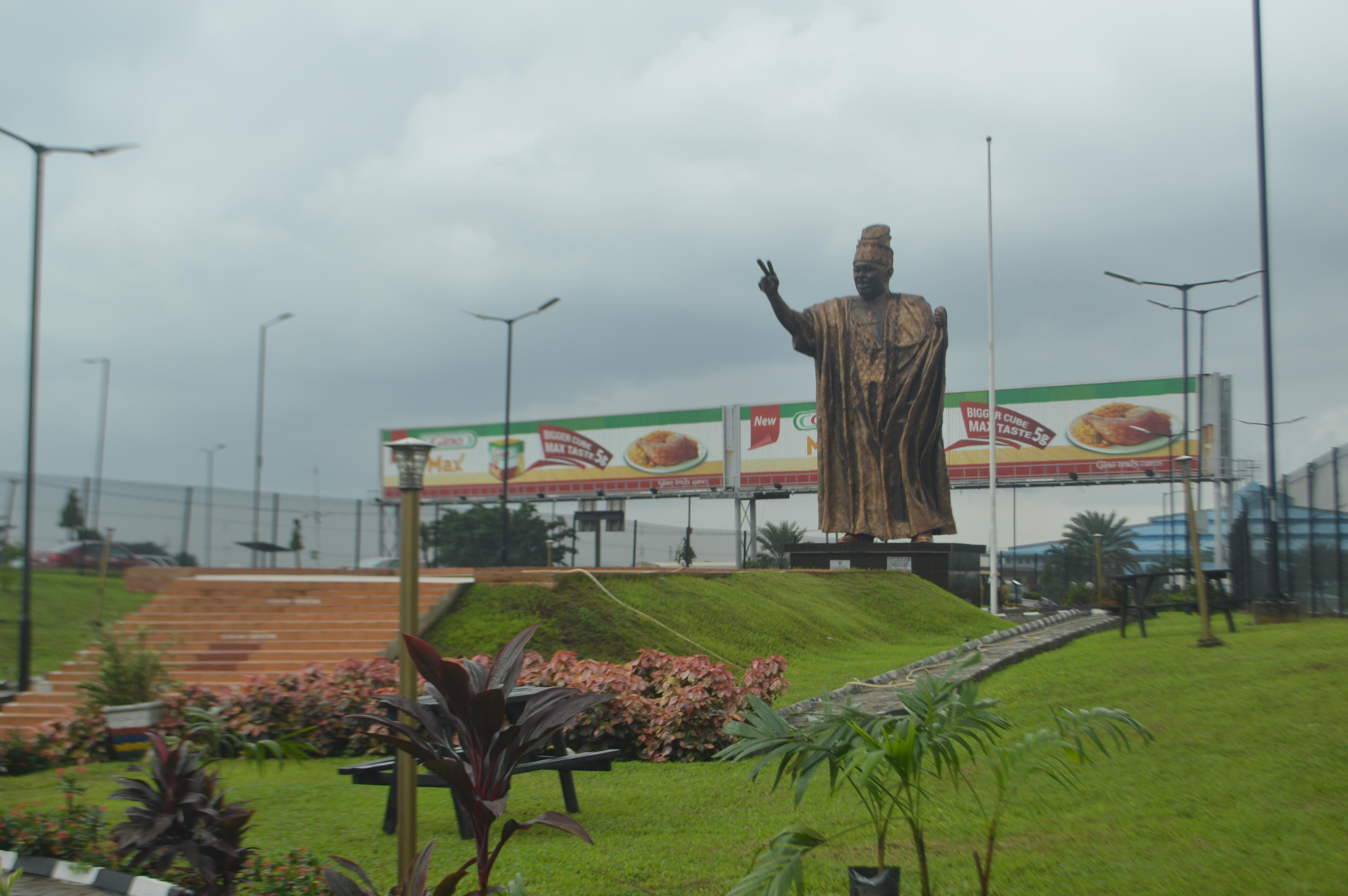
MKO Garden, Ojota, Lagos

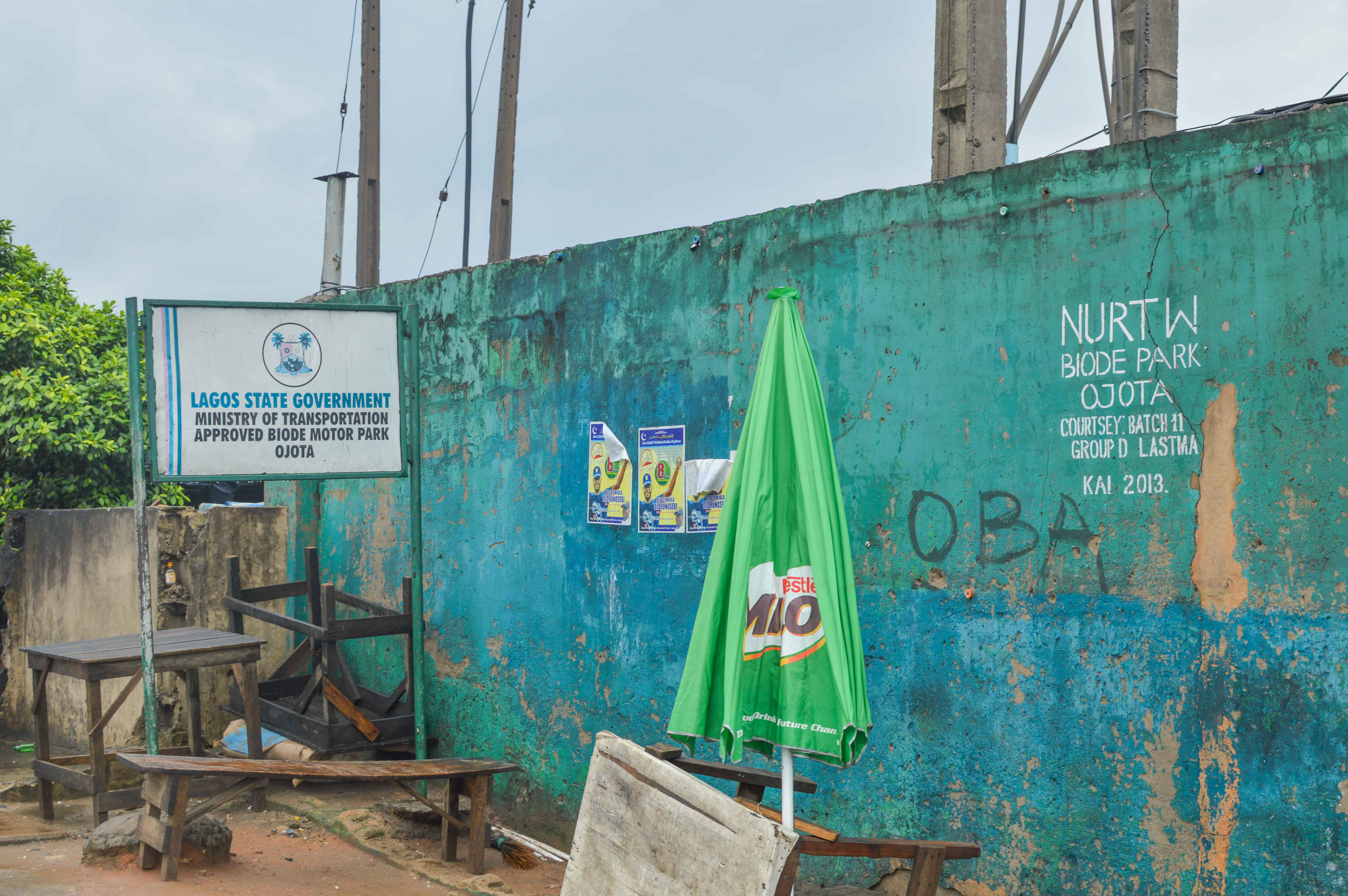
A garage in Ojota

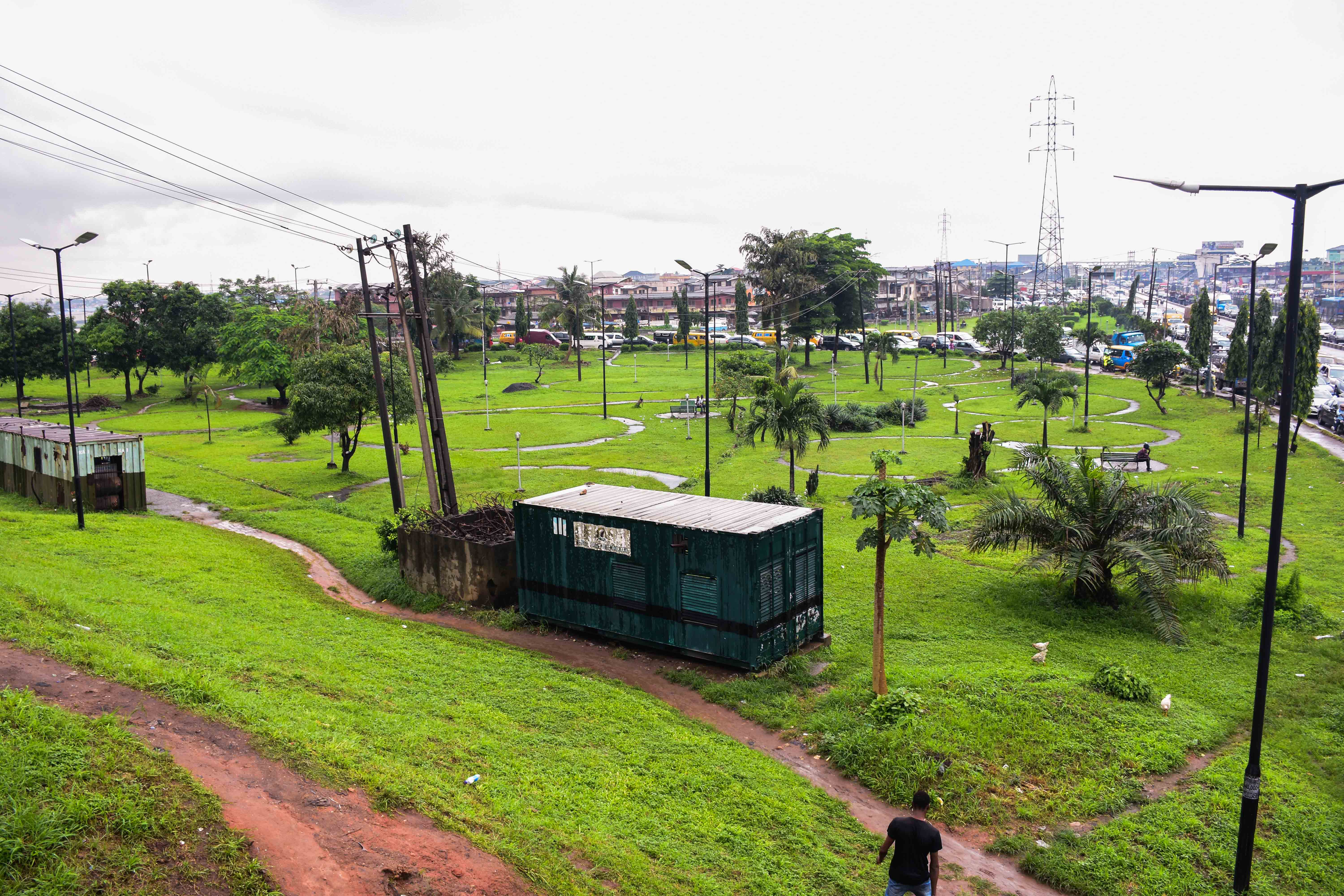
A garden at Ojota

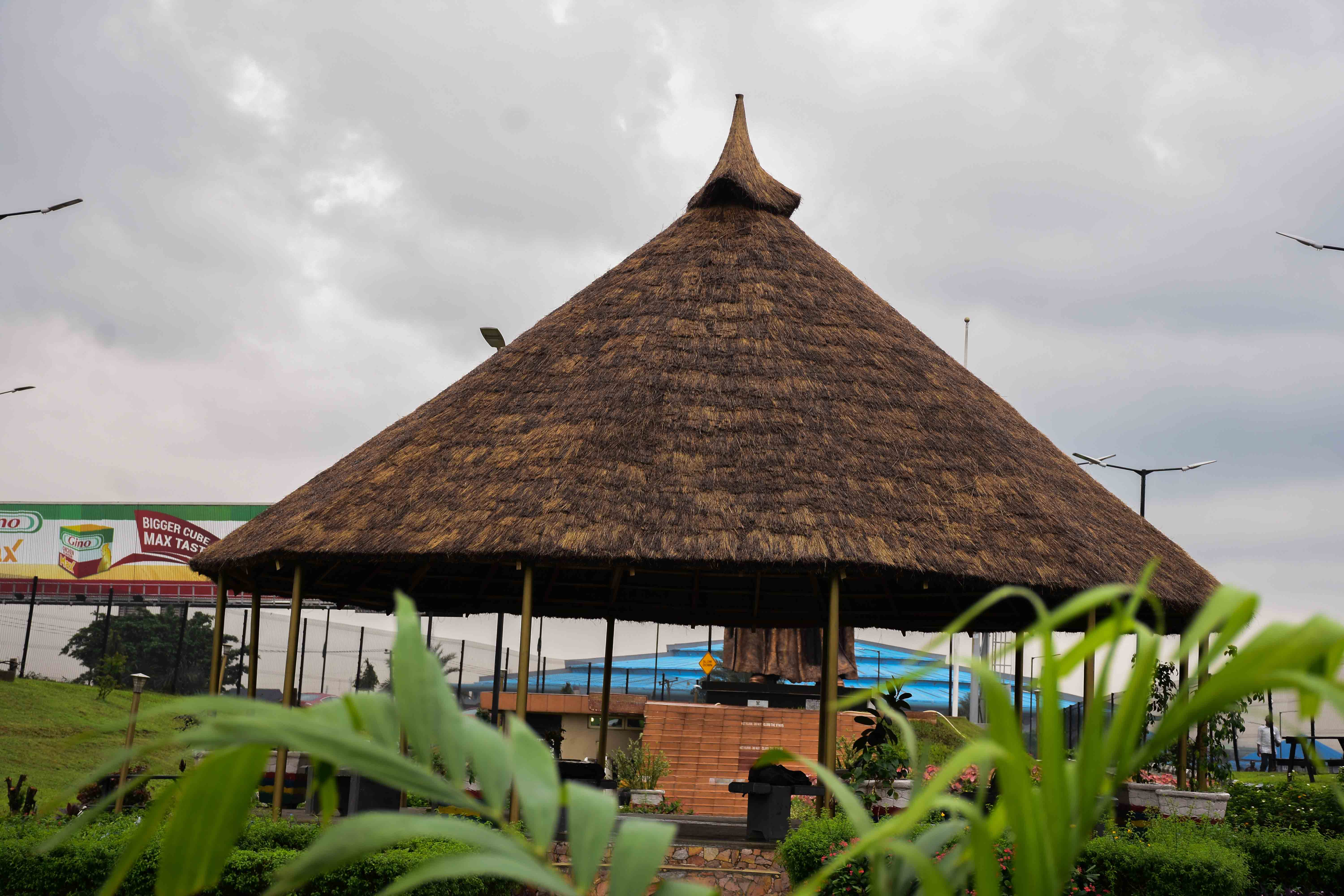

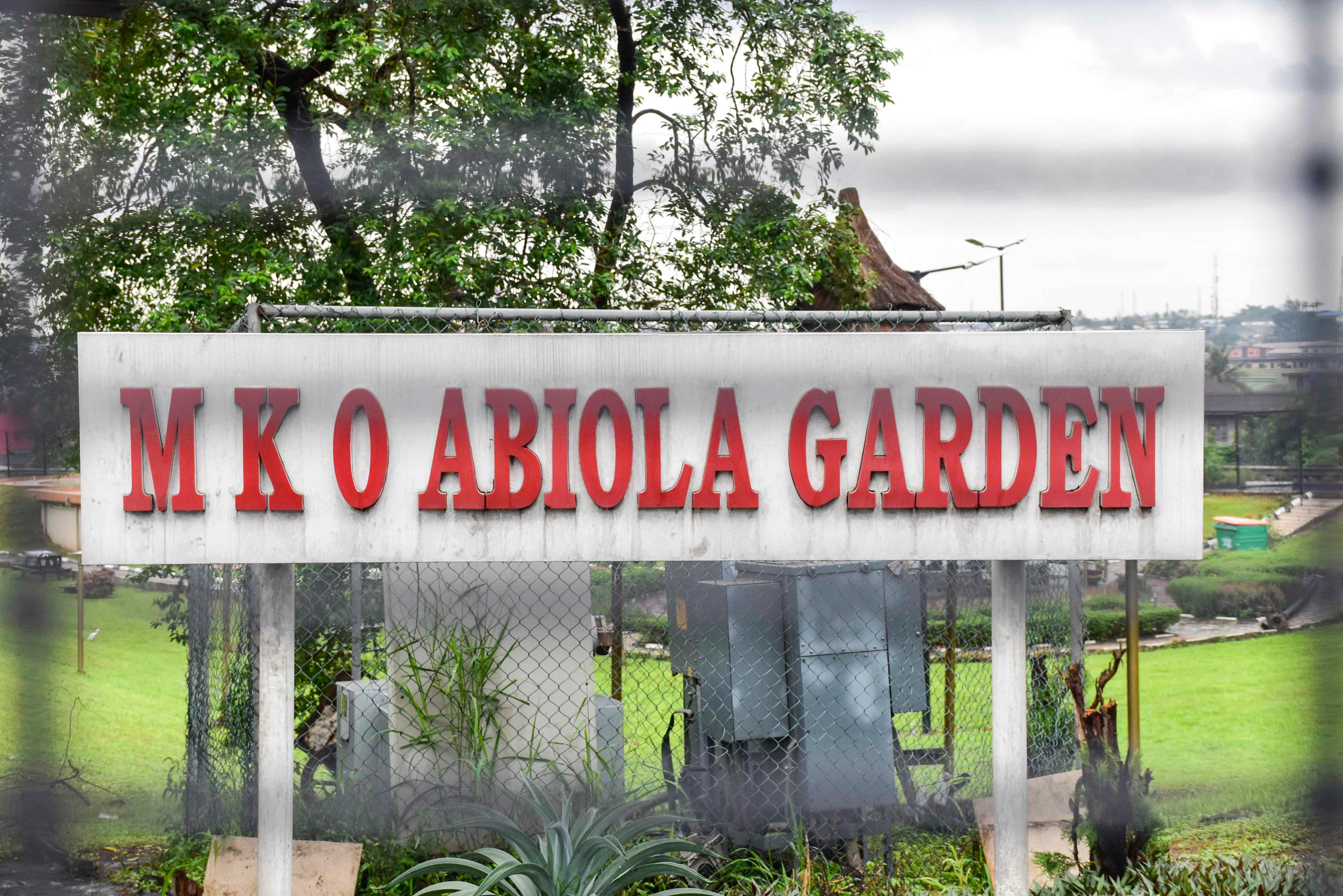

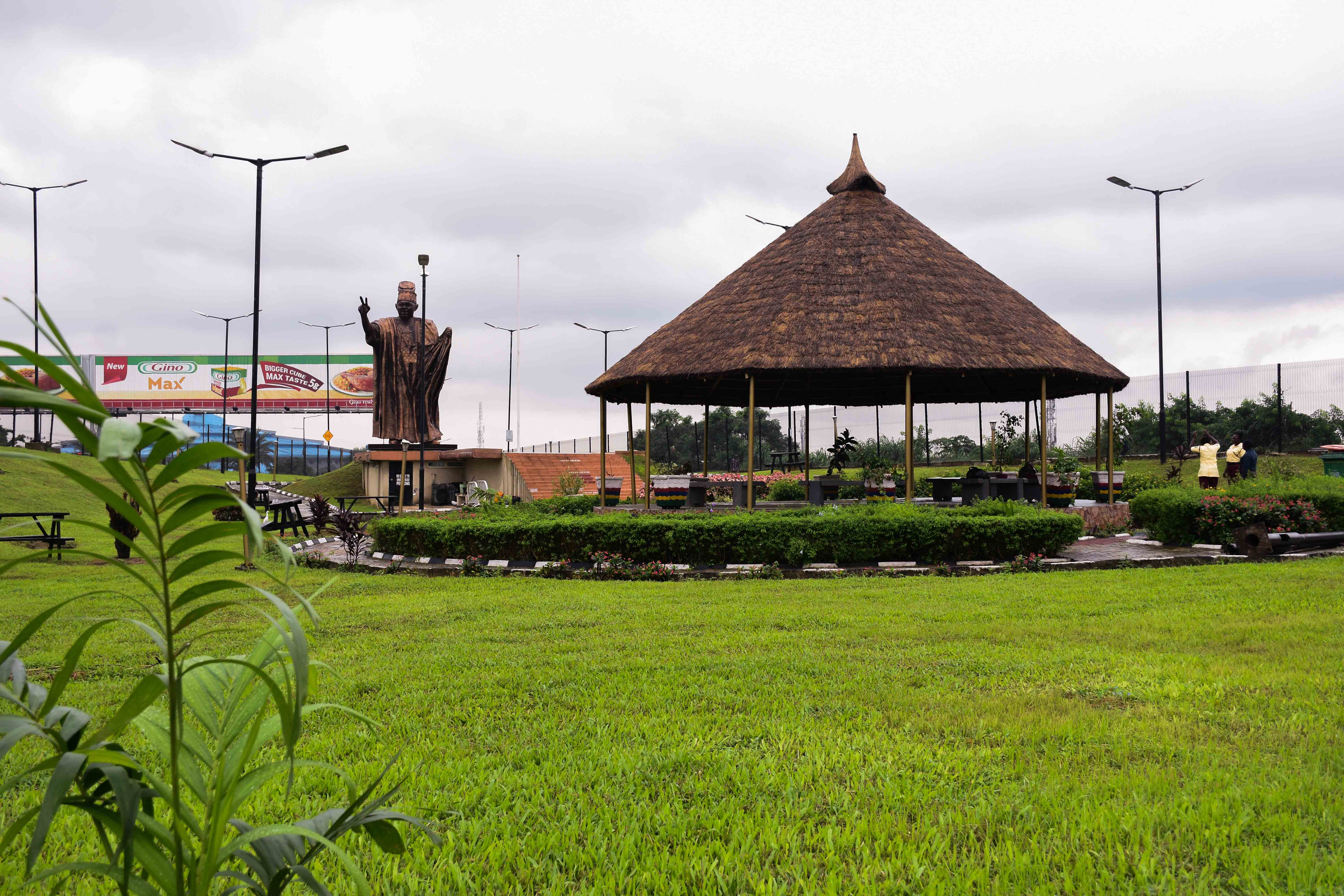

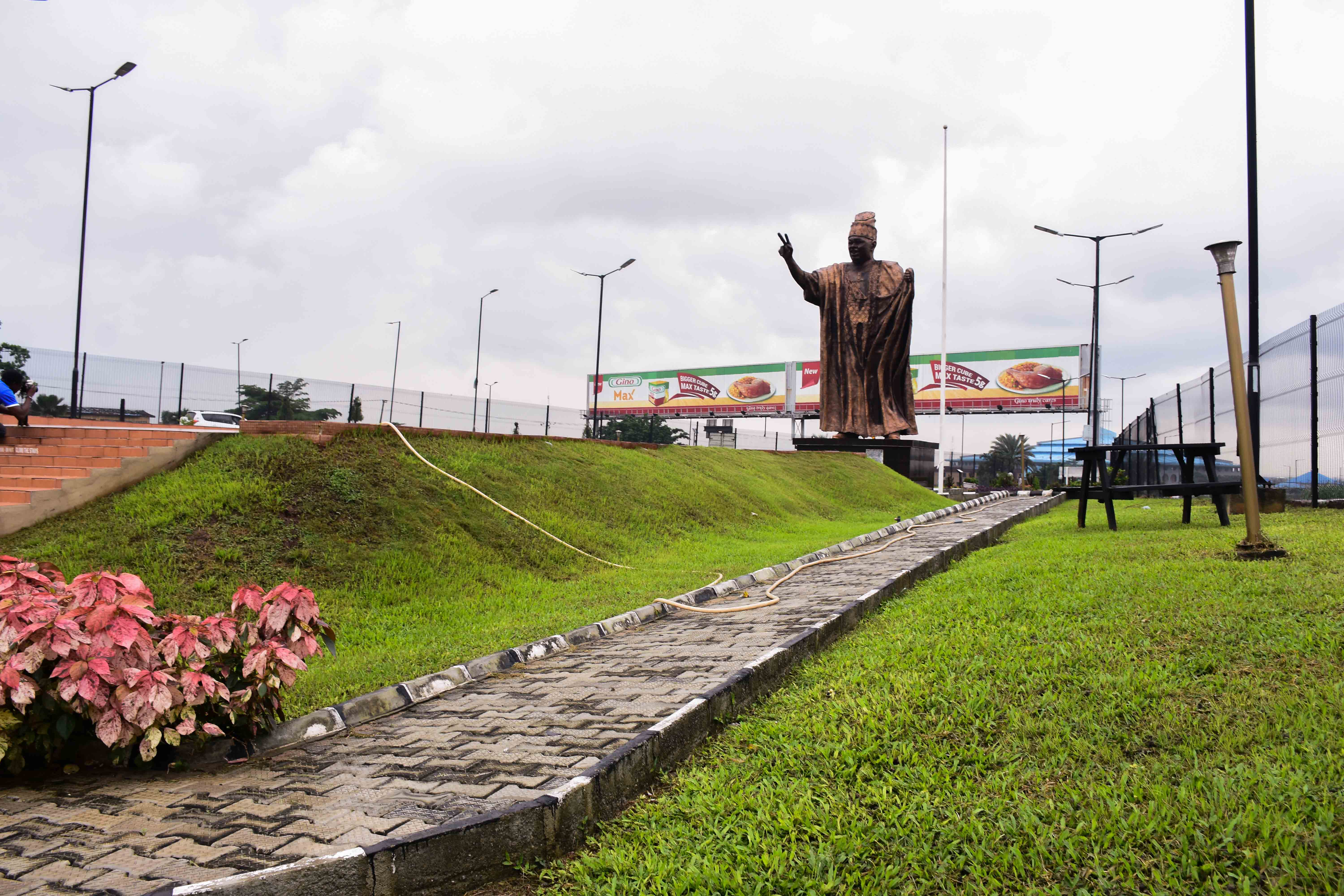
