= Nigeria–Pakistan relations =

- Pakistan: Nigeria

Diplomatic mission
- Pakistani High-commission, Abuja: Nigerian High-commission, Islamabad

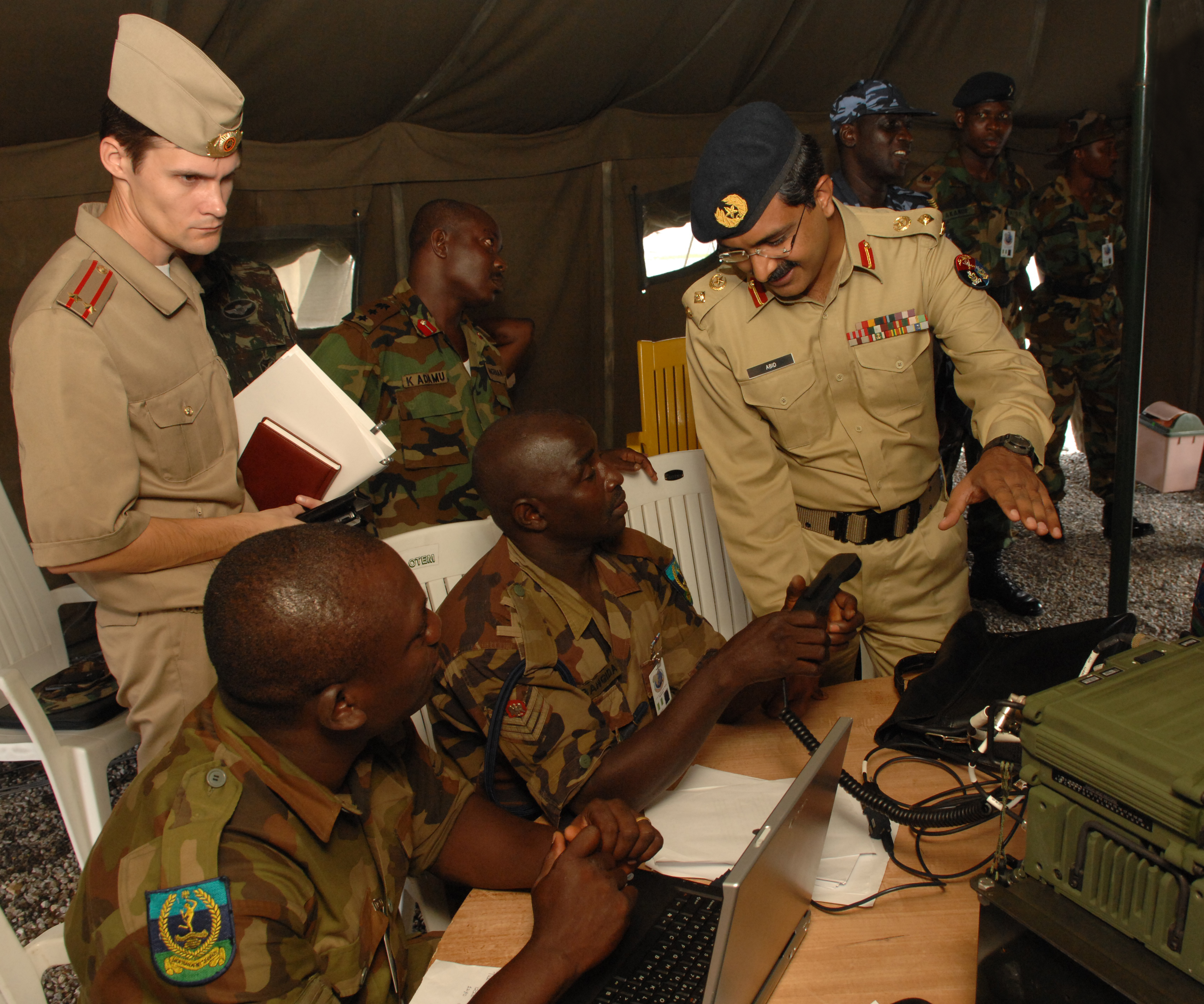
Defence attachés from Pakistan and Russia visit the communications tent at the Nigerian Air Force Base, Abuja, Nigeria, on July 21, 2008, during Africa Endeavor 2008.

Nigeria–Pakistan relations are the bilateral relations between Pakistan and Nigeria. Pakistan maintains a High Commission in Abuja, while Nigeria operates a High Commission in Islamabad and a consulate-general in Karachi. The Government of Pakistan plans to open a trade mission agency in Lagos and the Government of Nigeria is also expected to open its trade mission agency in Karachi. The two states have maintained a close relationship, which was described by the Defence Minister of Nigeria as "friendly" and like a "family tie".

Both countries are republics in the Commonwealth of Nations and members of the Organisation of Islamic Cooperation.

== History ==
Relations between Pakistan and Nigeria are friendly, affable and strong. In January 2009, Nigeria's then Minister of Defence, Shittima Musa, stated that "Nigeria and Pakistan would continue to maintain closer relations" and that the two countries had also declared to forge closer military ties, especially in military training and transfer of technology.

Nigeria and Pakistan are both members of the Organisation of Islamic Cooperation and the Commonwealth of Nations.

== Diplomatic relations ==
Pakistan has a High Commission in Abuja and Nigeria has a High Commission in Islamabad, as well as a consulate-general in Karachi. The two states have maintained a close relationship, which has been described by the Nigerian Defence Minister as "friendly" and like a "family tie"

== Cooperation ==
Nigeria and Pakistan have a number of bilateral agreements. Among the most significant, they agreed to cooperation on law enforcement, particularly with regards to narcotics shipping The presidents met in New York at the United Nations headquarters prior to a session of the General Assembly in September 2004.

However, defence is the area in which both countries are most keen to develop their relations. Indeed, in January 2009, the Nigerian Defence Minister vowed to further develop their relationship after a visit by the Pakistani High Commissioner.

== Economic relations ==
Bilateral trade between Nigeria and Pakistan reached US$56 million in 2010. Pakistan exported $37million worth of goods to Nigeria while it imported $19 million worth of goods from the Nigeria. Pakistan main export items included textile garments, home appliances, surgical equipment and rice.

The two nations maintain good trade relations, with visits by trade delegations, including a significant visit from Nigeria to the Islamabad Chamber of Commerce in order to hold talks with the Chamber's President. In the talks, the two parties discussed an increase in bilateral trade and the possibility of entering into joint ventures, such as in textiles, pharmaceuticals and other areas in order to increase the volume of trade between the two.

A similar meeting took place in December 2005, where the leader of the delegation stated that "active co-operation in trade was imperative to increase the trade volume of the two sides". Other meetings were conducted in January 2006 and, more recently and more significantly, March 2008, in which diplomats emphasised the importance of increasing bilateral trade- at the time of the meeting, Pakistan's exports to Nigeria stood at US$23.2 million, whereas, in the same period, imports from Nigeria were around US$10 million

Pakistan suffers energy shortages and there is demand for an export of oil to Karachi. There is demand for Chemists and Technical energy workers from Pakistan to Nigeria.

=== Trade and investment ===
	2007	2008		2009		2010		2011		2012		2013		2014		2015		2016	
Nigeria Exports	Nil	$42.9 M	▲	$24.9 M	▼	$38.2 M	▲	$18.6 M	▼	$24.4 M	▲	$39.9 M	▲	$40.9 M	▲	$47.7 M	▲	$79.4 M	▲
Pakistan Exports	Nil	$96.2 M	▲	$151 M	▲	$232 M	▲	$172 M	▼	$88.6 M	▼	$117 M	▲	$116 M	▼	$87 M	▼	$36.9 M	▼
Total Trade	Nil	$139.1 M	▲	$175.9 M	▲	$270.2 M	▲	$190.6 M	▼	$113 M	▼	$156.9 M	▲	$156.9 M	Steady	$154.7 M	▼	$116.3 M	▼
Note: All values are in U.S. dollars.

== Security relations ==
Throughout the relationship, meetings have taken place between the defence ministries of Pakistan and Nigeria, including those between Defence Ministers themselves and high-ranking military officials. For example, in June 2008, Nigeria's Admiral G.T.A. Adekeye, the chief of Nigeria's naval staff held talks with the Pakistani Defence Secretary. Perhaps of greater significance, the then head of the Nigerian Army met with then Pakistani president Pervez Musharraf in September 2004, with the objective of "[enhancing] existing excellent relations enjoyed between the two armies"

With the close ties of the two nations and Pakistan's nuclear capability, there has been consideration given to the possibility of Nigeria purchasing nuclear arms. In the Pakistani chairman of joint chiefs of staff said "[Pakistan] is working out the dynamics of how they can assist Nigeria's armed forces to strengthen its military capability and to acquire nuclear power", a statement which proved somewhat controversial, particularly in Washington, D.C., where members of the Bush administration were reportedly "baffled".
The statement regarding nuclear cooperation was later retracted, with a spokesman for the Pakistani Interior Ministry claiming it was "incorrect" and that nuclear weapons were not intended to be a part of the offer and Nigeria has since denied it is seeking a nuclear capability.

More recently, a Pakistani Government advisor has said that the involvement of the Pakistani military in Nigeria was important for the latter's stability, with Nigerian officers being sent to Pakistan for training.

Defense ministers of both Pakistan and Nigeria have also signed a Memorandum of Undersigned (MoU) to enhance defence collaboration

Pakistan has supported Nigeria in its fight against Boko Haram, it supplied the Nigerian military with armored tanks and other advanced military hardware.
