= Bashir Tofa =

Nigerian politician (1947–2022)

Bashir Usman Tofa
- Born: 20 June 1947; Kano, Nigeria
- Died: 3 January 2022 (age 74); Kano
- Education: Shahuci Special Primary School; City Senior Primary School
- Alma mater: City of London College
- Occupation: Politician
- Known for: Bashir Tofa
- Notable work: Tunaninka Kamannin ka, Rayuwa Bayan Mutuwa, Arewa Daga ina zuwa Ina, Kimiyyar Sararin Samaniya, Kimiyya da Al'ajaban Qur'ani, Gajerun Labarai.
- Political party: National Republican Convention (NRC)
- Children: Ruƙayya, Uthman, Rabi'ah, Amina, Khausar and Muhammad
- Parents: Alhaji Usman (father); Hajiya Rakiya (mother)

Bashir Othman Tofa (20 June 1947 – 3 January 2022) was a Nigerian politician. A Kanuri Muslim from the northern state of Kano, Tofa was the National Republican Convention (NRC), candidate in the annulled Nigeria's 12 June 1993 presidential election, which was organised by the military government of General Ibrahim Babangida.

== Life ==
Tofa was born in Kano, Nigeria, from a Kanuri family on 20 June 1947. He had his primary education at Shahuci Special Primary School, Kano and then continued studies at City Senior Primary School in Kano. From 1962 to 1966, he attended Provincial College, Kano. After completing his studies at the Provincial school, he worked for Royal Exchange Insurance company from 1967 to 1968. From 1970 to 1973, he attended City of London College. Tofa's stay into politics started in 1976 when he was a councilor of Dawakin Tofa Local Government Council, in 1977, he was elected a member into the Constituent Assembly. During the Nigerian Second Republic, Tofa was at various times the secretary of the Kano branch of NPN, he later became the party's national financial secretary and was a national member of the Green Revolution National Committee.

During the Third Republic, he was part of the Liberal Movement which metamorphosed to Liberal Convention when it was not registered as a political party, Tofa joined NRC in 1990. In 1993, when the Babangida administration introduced the Option A4 system, Tofa was elected the presidential candidate representing Kano. During the party primaries, he defeated Pere Ajunwa, Joe Nwodo and Dalhatu Tafida to clinch the NRC ticket. He was an ally of Halilu Akilu, the security chief at the time. His running mate in the election was Sylvester Ugoh, an Igbo and a former governor of the now defunct central bank of Biafra. Both were members of the defunct National Party of Nigeria.

Tofa was apparently defeated in the presidential election by his rival Moshood Abiola, a personal friend of Babangida and a Yoruba from southwest Nigeria, but the official results were never released by Babangida's government. Babangida was forced to step down in August 1993 after protests calling for the results of the election.

Tofa was a businessman, an oil trader and an industrialist. He was chairman of International Petro-Energy Company (IPEC) and Abba Othman and Sons Ltd. He was also involved as a board member in Impex Ventures, Century Merchant Bank and General Metal Products Ltd.

He authored several books in Hausa language, some of which are:

- Tunaninka Kamanninka (The way you think reflects in your character)
- Kimiyyar Sararin Samaniya (Space science) •Kimiyya da Al’ajaban Al-Kur’ani (The science and wonders of the Qur’an)
- Gajerun Labarai (Short stories)
- Amazadan a Birnin Aljanu (Amazadan in the land of the spirits)
- Amazadan da Zoben Farsiyas (Amazadan and Farsiyas ring),
- Rayuwa Bayan Mutuwa (Life after death), and Mu Sha Dariya (Let us laugh)
- AREWA daga ina, zuwa ina?

Tofa died at the Aminu Kano Teaching Hospital on 3 January 2022, at the age of 74.
