= 1993 Nigerian presidential election =

- 12 June 1993
Nominee	Moshood Abiola	Bashir Tofa
Party	SDP	NRC
Running mate	Baba Gana Kingibe	Sylvester Ugoh
Popular vote	8,341,309	5,952,087
Percentage	58.36%	41.64%
- States won by Abiola (green) and Tofa (red)
President before election
Ibrahim Badamasi Babangida
Elected President
Election results annulled
(Sani Abacha becomes head of state)

Presidential elections were held in Nigeria on 12 June 1993. The elections were the first held since the 1983 military coup d'état which ended the Second Nigerian Republic. They were the culmination of a transition from military to civilian rule spearheaded by incumbent president Ibrahim Babangida. However, the results were annulled by the military government, citing electoral irregularities, when unofficial returns indicated a substantial victory for Moshood Abiola of the Social Democratic Party over his opponent, Bashir Tofa of the National Republican Convention.

The annulment led to protests and Babangida's resignation as president, the installation of a weak interim civilian government, and the continuation of military rule under Sani Abacha following a bloodless palace coup in November 1993. Abiola, the apparent winner of the election, died in prison in 1998 after he was charged and convicted of treason for declaring himself president and commander-in-chief.

== Background ==
In 1983, the Nigerian army ousted elected president Shehu Shagari following a dispute over Shagari's orders in the Chadian–Nigerian War. Led by Ibrahim Babangida and financed by Egba aristocrat Moshood Abiola, the military installed major general Muhammadu Buhari, the leading commander in Chad, as president of the new military government.

On 27 August 1985, Babangida deposed Buhari through a palace coup. Babangida established the Armed Forces Ruling Council as the formal military government and initiated a transition process to establish the return of civilian rule, targeting October 1990. In 1987, the government established the National Electoral Commission (NEC) to oversee the electoral process. The Babangida government also established the Nigerian Political Bureau of 1986 to advise on this transition. The Bureau's 1987 report recommended the facilitation of political competition to bridge ethnic and religious divides in the country. As a result, Babangida delayed the target for civilian rule to 1992. It was later delayed again to January 1993 before finally being set for 27 August 1993.

To further facilitate political culture, the government created new state and local governments, with the number of states rising from 21 to 30 from 1987 to 1991. Local governments also increased, doubling to almost 600 by 1993. Local government elections were held in 1987 and 1991, and state government elections for the legislature and executive offices were held in 1991 and 1992.

The Babangida government also restricted participation in the new government. Through Decree 25 of 1987, Babangida banned politicians and public officials of the Second Republic from participating in political activities of the Third Republic. During this period, the government also foiled coup attempts by major general Mamman Vatsa in 1985 and major Gideon Orkar in 1990. In late 1992, during the nomination process for the upcoming presidential election, Babangida replaced the Armed Forces Ruling Council with a new National Defense and Security Council and a civilian Transitional Council, led by Ernest Shonekan, a prominent Egba businessman, as head of government.

== Primaries and nominations ==
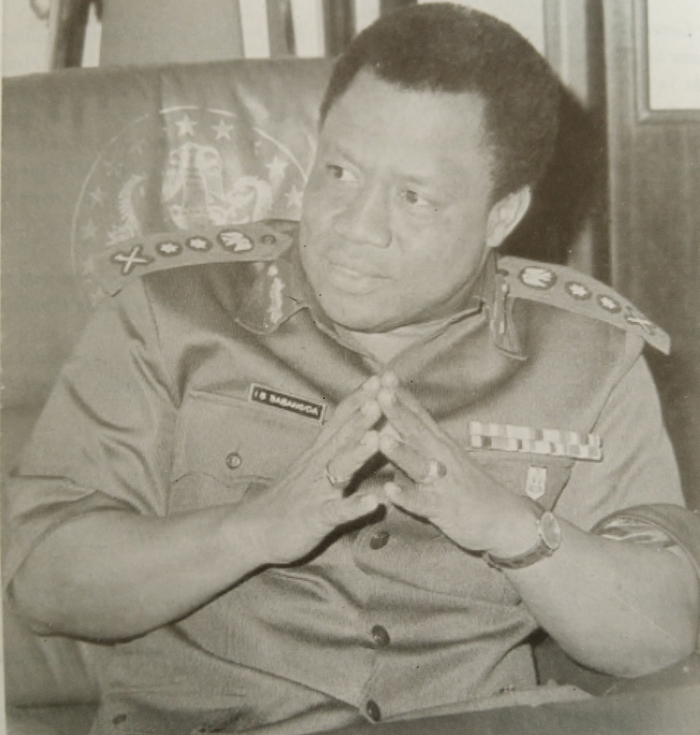
The military government of incumbent Ibrahim Babangida oversaw and later annulled the conduct of the election.

In May 1989, President Babangida lifted the ban on political parties. Several parties submitted applications for recognition, but only six were approved by the National Electoral Commission, which was handicapped by poor organizational structures and finances and claimed to be unable to verify most of the applicants' claims. In October 1989, however, Babangida rejected these six parties as well, accusing them of being ethnically and regionally polarized and riddled with factions. Instead, Babangida organized two new big tent parties: the right-leaning National Republican Convention (NRC) and the left-leaning Social Democratic Party (SDP), with the government providing initial funding and office space for each. The government was also heavily involved in the formulation of party manifestos and constitutions and trained the parties on electoral techniques through the Centre for Democratic Studies. Overall, the military government spent billions of naira on the transition through the NEC and the parties.

Party primaries for were held in August and September 1992 to nominate presidential candidates, but these were cancelled by Babangida, citing electoral fraud. The candidates who participated in these primaries, including lieutenant general Shehu Musa Yar'Adua and Adamu Ciroma, were barred from contesting again. Instead, a nomination process was established consisting of a "knockout" contest from the local to the national level, using an open ballot system referred to as "Option A4." This nomination process resulted in the nomination of Moshood Abiola, a multimillionaire southern businessman, by the SDP and Bashir Tofa, a northern businessman, by the NRC. Both nominees were Muslim, considered to have close ties to the military, and had been members of the ruling National Party of Nigeria (NPN) during the Second Republic. Although Abiola was widely known throughout the country, having been a candidate for the NPN nomination in the 1983 presidential election against incumbent president Shagari, Tofa was relatively unknown outside of his home state of Kano. Abiola had only been a member of the SDP for a month when he won the nomination.

As a running mate, Tofa selected Sylvester Ugoh, a Christian economist from the south-east, thereby creating a regional and religious balance. Abiola selected former diplomat and former party chairman Baba Gana Kingibe.

== Campaign ==
Abiola's campaign focused on economic issues. He was a vocal critic of the Babangida government's structural adjustment program, which imposed austerity measures to ensure state fiscal discipline following the prescriptions of the International Monetary Fund and World Bank. Tofa was less vocally critical of the program, given his party platform's support for it, and Babangida, having once suggested that he should remain president until the year 2000. He instead focused on presenting himself as the more effective candidate. Ahead of election day, there were suggestions that the military leadership were uneasy about a possible Abiola presidency and would not accept the result if he won.

On 10 June, just two days before the scheduled election, Arthur Nzeribe and the Association for a Better Nigeria, an organization with ties to the military, obtained a high court injunction against the election on the basis of alleged corruption. Humphrey Nwosu, chair of the NEC, disregarded the injunction and challenged the court's jurisdiction on electoral matters, proceeding with the election as scheduled.

== Disinformation ==
Disinformation during 1993 election such as fake news deliberately spread to mislead citizens about election information. Disinformation brings electoral fraud which is purposeful action that is taken to tamper with the electoral process in order to affect the result of the elections, which all happened during the 1993 election.

== Results ==
On 13 June, the election was staged in the presence of independent observers, including foreign and local journalists, Commonwealth and other international delegates, and observers trained by the Centre for Democratic Studies. These observers deemed the election free and fair; although there were administrative and political issues, no episodes of serious violence were recorded.

The NEC began announcing the first batch of election results on 14 June: Turnout was low at around 35 percent. Of the 6.6 million votes initially announced, Abiola received 4.3 million. In the initial results, Abiola won 19 out of 30 states, including all states in the southeast and Tofa's home state of Kano, and the Federal Capital Territory, breaking through ethno-religious divides having received support from all regions of the country. Had Abiola been declared the winner, he would have been at that time the first southerner elected as president.

On 15 June, the Association for a Better Nigeria obtained another court injunction to halt the counting and verification of votes. On 16 June, the NEC announced via Radio Nigeria that it would accepted the court injunction and stop the count. However, democracy activists leaked the final unofficial vote on 18 June, defying the law to reveal that Abiola won a 58 percent majority. On 24 June, Babangida announced the annulment of the election, citing claims of vote buying and the need to protect the judiciary.

=== Unofficial results ===
Candidate	Party	Votes	%
Moshood Abiola	Social Democratic Party	8,341,309	58.36
Bashir Tofa	National Republican Convention	5,952,087	41.64
Total		14,293,396	100.00
Source: African Elections Database

Unofficial results by state

The unofficial results leaked by activists included state-level results.

State or district	Abiola SDP		Tofa NRC		Margin		Total votes
State or district	Votes	%	Votes	%	Votes	%	Total votes
Abia	105,273	41.04%	151,227	58.96%	-45,954	-17.92	256,500
Adamawa	140,875	45.72%	167,239	54.28%	-26,364	-8.56	308,114
Akwa Ibom	214,787	51.86%	199,342	48.14%	15,445	3.72	414,129
Anambra	212,024	57.11%	159,258	42.89%	52,766	14.22	371,282
Bauchi	339,339	39.27%	524,836	60.73%	-185,497	-21.46	864,175
Benue	246,830	56.99%	186,302	43.01%	60,528	13.98	433,132
Borno	153,496	54.40%	128,684	45.60%	24,812	8.80	282,180
Cross River	189,303	55.23%	153,452	44.77%	35,851	10.46	342,755
Delta	327,277	69.30%	145,001	30.70%	182,276	38.60	472,278
Edo	205,407	66.48%	103,572	33.52%	101,835	32.96	308,979
Enugu	263,101	48.09%	284,050	51.91%	-20,949	-3.82	547,151
Imo	159,350	44.86%	195,836	55.14%	-36,486	-10.28	355,186
Jigawa	138,552	60.67%	89,836	39.33%	48,716	21.34	228,388
Kaduna	389,713	52.20%	356,860	47.80%	32,853	4.40	746,573
Kano	169,619	52.28%	154,809	47.72%	14,810	4.56	324,428
Katsina	171,162	38.70%	271,077	61.30%	-99,915	-22.60	442,239
Kebbi	70,219	32.66%	144,808	67.34%	-74,589	-34.68	215,027
Kogi	222,760	45.60%	265,732	54.40%	-42,972	-8.80	488,492
Kwara	272,270	77.24%	80,209	22.76%	192,061	54.48	352,479
Lagos	883,965	85.54%	149,432	14.46%	734,533	71.08	1,033,397
Niger	136,350	38.11%	221,437	61.89%	-85,087	-23.78	357,787
Ogun	425,725	87.78%	59,246	12.22%	366,479	75.56	484,971
Ondo	883,024	84.42%	162,994	15.58%	720,030	68.84	1,046,018
Osun	365,266	83.52%	72,068	16.48%	293,198	67.04	437,334
Oyo	536,011	83.52%	105,788	16.48%	430,223	67.04	641,799
Plateau	417,565	61.68%	259,394	38.32%	158,171	23.36	676,959
Rivers	370,578	36.63%	640,973	63.37%	-270,395	-26.74	1,011,551
Sokoto	97,726	20.79%	372,250	79.21%	-274,524	-58.42	469,976
Taraba	101,887	61.42%	64,001	38.58%	37,886	22.84	165,888
Yobe	111,887	63.59%	64,061	36.41%	47,826	27.18	175,948
F.C.T.	19,968	52.16%	18,313	47.84%	1,655	4.32	38,281
Total	8,341,309	58.36%	5,952,087	41.64%	2,389,222	16.72	14,293,396

== Aftermath and legacy ==
In the aftermath of the election, the government proscribed or shut down media and arrested journalists, issued decrees preventing court cases on the annulled election, and terminated the NEC.

Beginning in July, there were a series of violent protests in the southwest region. It is estimated that government security forces killed over 100 people quelling the initial riots. Subsequent unrest caused the closures of banks and businesses throughout the region. The Igbo population in Lagos were also reported to have fled to the eastern region in the face of palpable tension.

=== Interim government and November 1993 coup ===
Following the election, twelve former generals, including military rulers Olusegun Obasanjo and Muhammadu Buhari, issued a joint statement demanding the removal of Babangida from power. In early August 1993, Abiola flew to London and Washington to unsuccessfully seek international support for his presidency. Babangida was pressured by the Defense Council to stick to the handover date, and he resigned on 26 August. Following his resignation, the civilian Transitional Council, led by Ernest Shonekan, served as an interim transitional government, with Sani Abacha, a Babangida confidant, serving as Defense Minister. Abiola returned to Nigeria on 24 September.

Shonekan scheduled new elections in February 1994. However, his position as head of government was tenuous, particularly his control over the armed forces. In early November 1993, a Lagos high court ruled that the decree establishing the interim government was signed by Babangida after his resignation from the presidency, thus rendering the Shonekan government illegal. The interim government also had to contend with rising debt and inflation and a weak naira. At the time, the World Bank Group ranked the Nigerian economy as among the twenty poorest in the world. To revive the economy, Shonekan resumed talks with the World Bank and the International Monetary Fund, and took the unpopular decision to remove subsidies on petroleum products. The cessation of subsidies led to a 700 percent increase in the price of petroleum products, and the Nigerian Labour Congress went on strike over the price increase.

On 17 November 1993, Sani Abacha toppled the interim government in a palace coup. Abacha dissolved the legislature and the state and local governments, replacing elected civilian state governors with military and police officers, and banned all political activity. To replace the civilian governments, Abacha established a Provisional Ruling Council and Federal Executive Council. His new cabinet was composed of civilian politicians, including Abiola's running mate, Baba Gana Kingibe, as foreign minister. Abacha also established a Constitutional Conference for a transition to civilian rule. The conference began on 18 January 1994. One-third of the delegates were nominated by the government, and the Ruling Council could veto decisions of the conference.

In June 1994, Abiola was arrested and charged with treason after declaring himself president and commander-in-chief. Abiola's arrest led to protests and a nine-week strike by petroleum workers, bankers, and academics. The strike by the petroleum sector, in particular, paralyzed the Nigerian economy. The Abacha government subsequently arrested union leaders and dismissed the civilian members of his cabinet. In March 1995, the Abacha government announced an alleged coup attempt and sentenced Olusegun Obasanjo, Shehu Musa Yar'Adua, and Beko Ransome-Kuti to death or lengthy prison sentences. International backlash resulted in lesser penalties for each.

In October 1995, Abacha set a timeframe of three years to hand over power to a civilian government. Sani Abacha died on 8 June 1998. Abiola died a month later in prison, on 7 July 1998.

=== International reaction ===
The annulment of the 1993 election was condemned by the United Kingdom, the Commonwealth of Nations, the United States and European Union, which suspended aid. The military government responded by accusing foreign governments of meddling in Nigerian affairs and seeking to destabilize the country.

=== Legacy ===
In 2018, Muhammadu Buhari, serving as civilian president under the Fourth Nigerian Republic, declared 12 June as Democracy Day. This declaration moved Democracy Day from 29 May, the date of the return to civilian rule in May 1999, to the date of the annulled 1993 election.

In February 2025, Babangida expressed regret for annulling the 1993 elections, declaring that the elections had been free and fair and that Abiola had won.

The results and aftermath of the election served as the setting for the award-winning 2025 film My Father's Shadow, written and directed by Yoruba filmmaker Akinola Davies Jr.
