= Sylvester Ugoh =

Nigerian politician

Governor Of Bank of Biafra
- In office May 30, 1967 – January 15, 1970
- Preceded by: Position Established
- Succeeded by: Position Abolished

Governor of the Bank of Biafra

Personal details
- Born: April 22, 1931 (age 95) Eastern Region
- Occupation: Banker

Sylvester Ugoh (born 22 April 1931) is a Nigerian economist and politician. He was the vice-presidential candidate of the National Republican Convention in the 1993 Nigerian presidential election, running alongside Bashir Tofa.

Ugoh previously served as Nigeria's Minister of Science and Technology and was governor of Bank of Biafra during the Nigerian Civil War.
