= Croatian New Zealanders =

Croatian-New Zealanders
Total population
- 2,550 – 100,000 (est.)

Languages
- New Zealand English, Croatian

Religion
- predominantly Roman Catholic

Related ethnic groups
- Croatian Australians

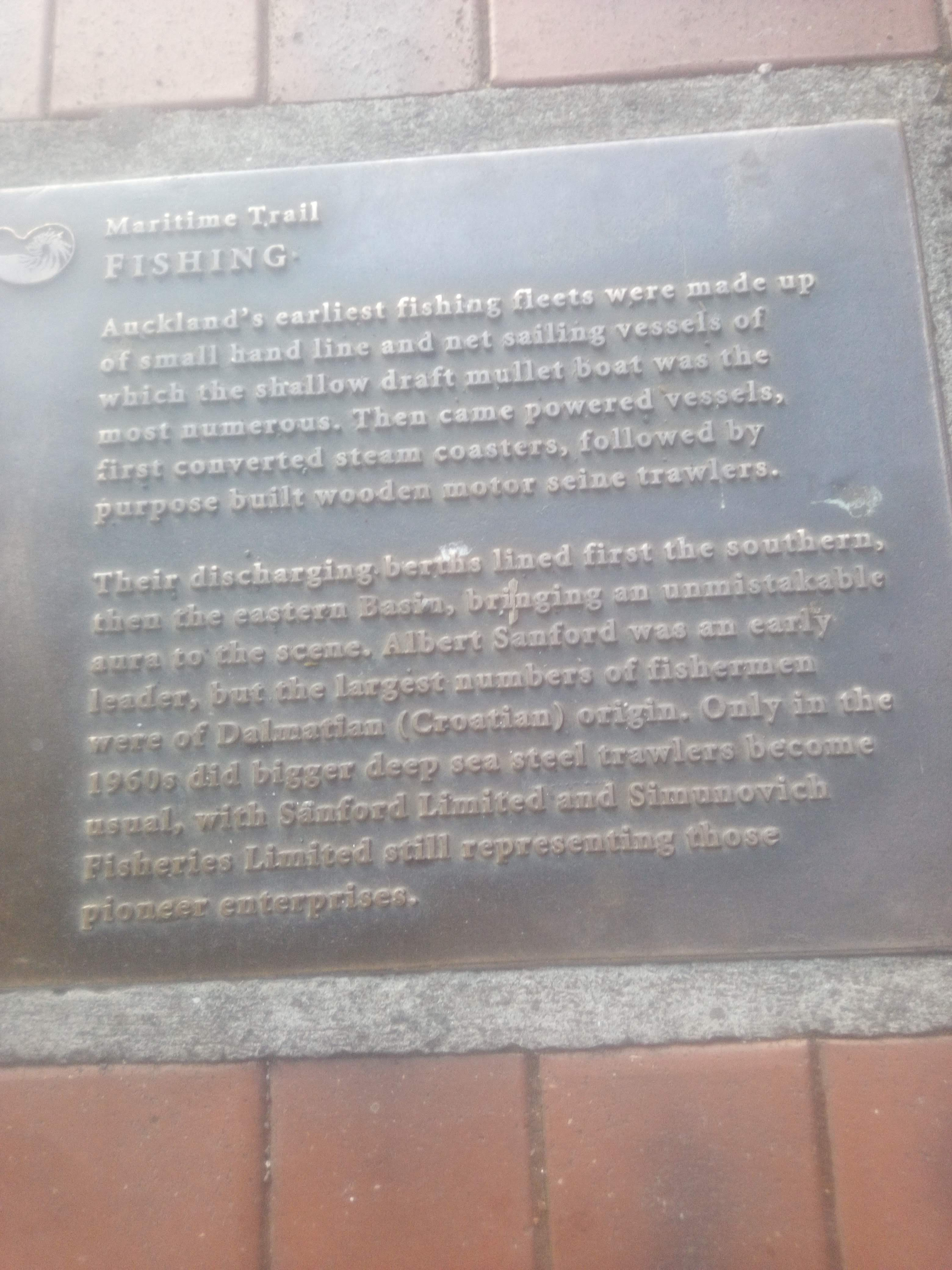
Plaque commemorating Croatian fishermen in Auckland

Croatian New Zealanders (Croatian: Novozelandski Hrvati) refers to New Zealand citizens of Croatian descent. It is estimated that over 100,000 New Zealanders have Croatian ancestry. There are 2,550 people who declared their nationality as Croats in the 2006 New Zealand census. The majority of these are located primarily in and around Auckland and Northland with small numbers in and around Canterbury and Southland.

The (generally neutral but sometimes mildly derogatory) term Dally or Dallie (short for Dalmatian) was often used in New Zealand to refer to people of Croatian descent before Croatia gained independence in 1991. Most people of Croatian descent are now referred to as Croatians, reflecting Croatia’s independence. The Dalmatian Cultural Society, founded in 1930 and based in Auckland, adopted Dalmatian in its name upon Croatia’s independence. Other Croatian cultural societies in New Zealand, including those in Auckland, the Waikato, and Wellington, have recognized "Croatian" as the appropriate name to reflect the country's independence.

== History ==
The earliest Croatian settlers in New Zealand date from the 1860s, largely arriving as sailors and pioneers, and as gold miners and prospectors during the Otago gold rush. The first person born in New Zealand of Croatian descent was Leander Thomas Pavletich in 1864. After the gold rush many moved to Northland attracted by kauri gum-digging, then a major source of income for Northland Māori and settlers. These early Dalmatian settlers were also responsible in large part for establishing the New Zealand wine industry. Forced off the kauri gumfields many moved into viticulture and winemaking instead, mainly in West Auckland around Kumeu, and in the Hawke's Bay region. Croatian family names such as Selak, Nobilo, Šoljan, Babich and Delegat still feature amongst the names of New Zealand's notable wineries, and two of the largest in New Zealand, Montana Wines (now Brancott Estate) and Villa Maria Estates, were established in the mid-20th century respectively by Croatian New Zealanders Ivan Yukich and Sir George Fistonich.

Croatian settlers have arrived in five main waves:

- 5,000 between 1890 and 1914, prior to World War I.
- 1,600 during the 1920s before the onset of the Great Depression.
- 600 in the 1930s, prior to World War II.
- 3,200 between 1945 and 1970.
- Arrivals during the 1990s, fleeing the Croatian War of Independence.

Croatian Catholic Mission in Auckland was established in 1904.

In July 2008, 800 people attended a celebration of 150 years of Croatian settlement in New Zealand hosted by Prime Minister Helen Clark and Ethnic Affairs Minister Chris Carter.

== Demographics ==
Together with the Irish, Croats are the most numerous ethnic group in Auckland. It is estimated that there are 100,000 people of Croatian descent in the country.

== Religion ==
Croatian Catholic Mission (Hrvatska katolička misija) in Auckland was established in 1904. In 1990, Mission was dedicated to the St. Leopold Mandić. Current Mission leader (since 2024) is Rev. Danko Bizjak, priest of the Diocese of Sisak. The Croatian Catholic Centre and Croatian Catholic Mission in Auckland operate in the area of the Holy Family parish in the western part of the city, established in 1960.

The first Mission leader was the Tyrolean missionary Josip Zanna, who spoke Croatian. After him, they were Milan Pavlinović from Podgora (1928–1937), Sebastijan Palić from Janjevo (1953–1989) and Ante Klarić from Split (since 1988); an important figure in the work of the Mission was the priest of Croatian origin Jure Marinović.

In 1908, Croatian immigrants donated to the St Patrick's Cathedral in Auckland the Calvary sculptures, which were restored in 1998.

Several Croatian bishops have made pastoral visits to New Zealand: Josip Bozanić (1998), Marin Barišić (2004), Petar Palić (2019) and Marko Medo (2025.)

== Culture ==
The Dalmatian Cultural Society in Auckland was established in 1930. Croats of Auckland gather in the King Tomislav Folklore Ensemble (Folklorni ansambl Kralj Tomislav), Croatian Club Incl. 1972. and Croatian cultural association (Hrvatsko kulturno društvo). There are also Croatian cultural associations in the Waikato and Wellington.

The University of Auckland has a Department of Croatian language. There is a Croatian Catholic supplementary school in Auckland.

== Sports ==
In October 2024, 24 New Zealand's rugby players of Croatian descent, led by Dave Jurlina, visited Croatia, following the example of similar visits organized in the 1970s and 1908s. The team played in Zagreb, Split (two games) and Makarska, with one game against the Croatian national team.

== Diplomacy ==
There is Consulate General of the Republic of Croatia in Auckland.

== Notable Croatian New Zealanders ==
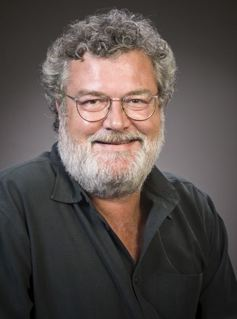
James Belich

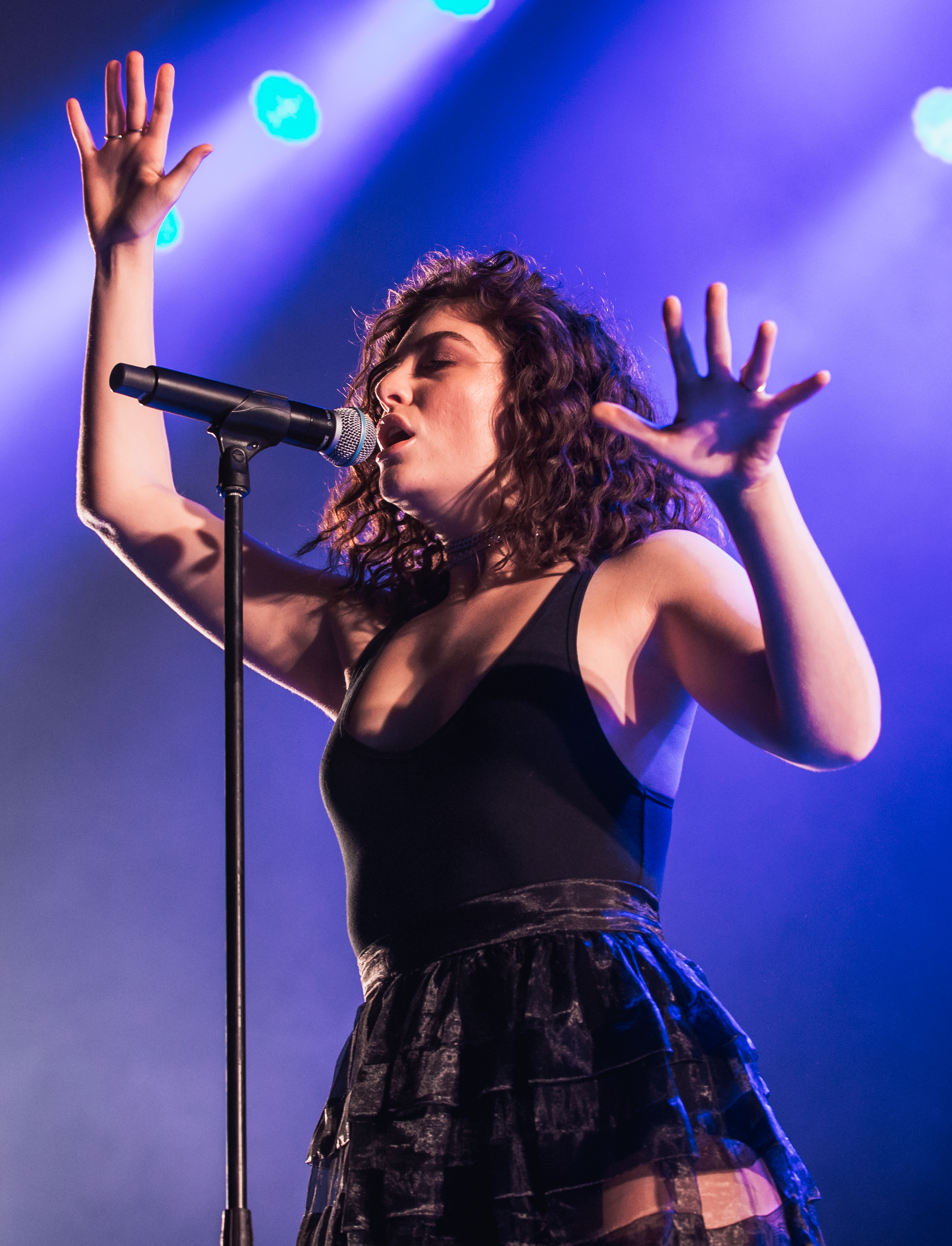
Lorde

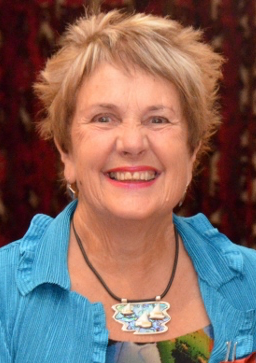
Frana Cardno

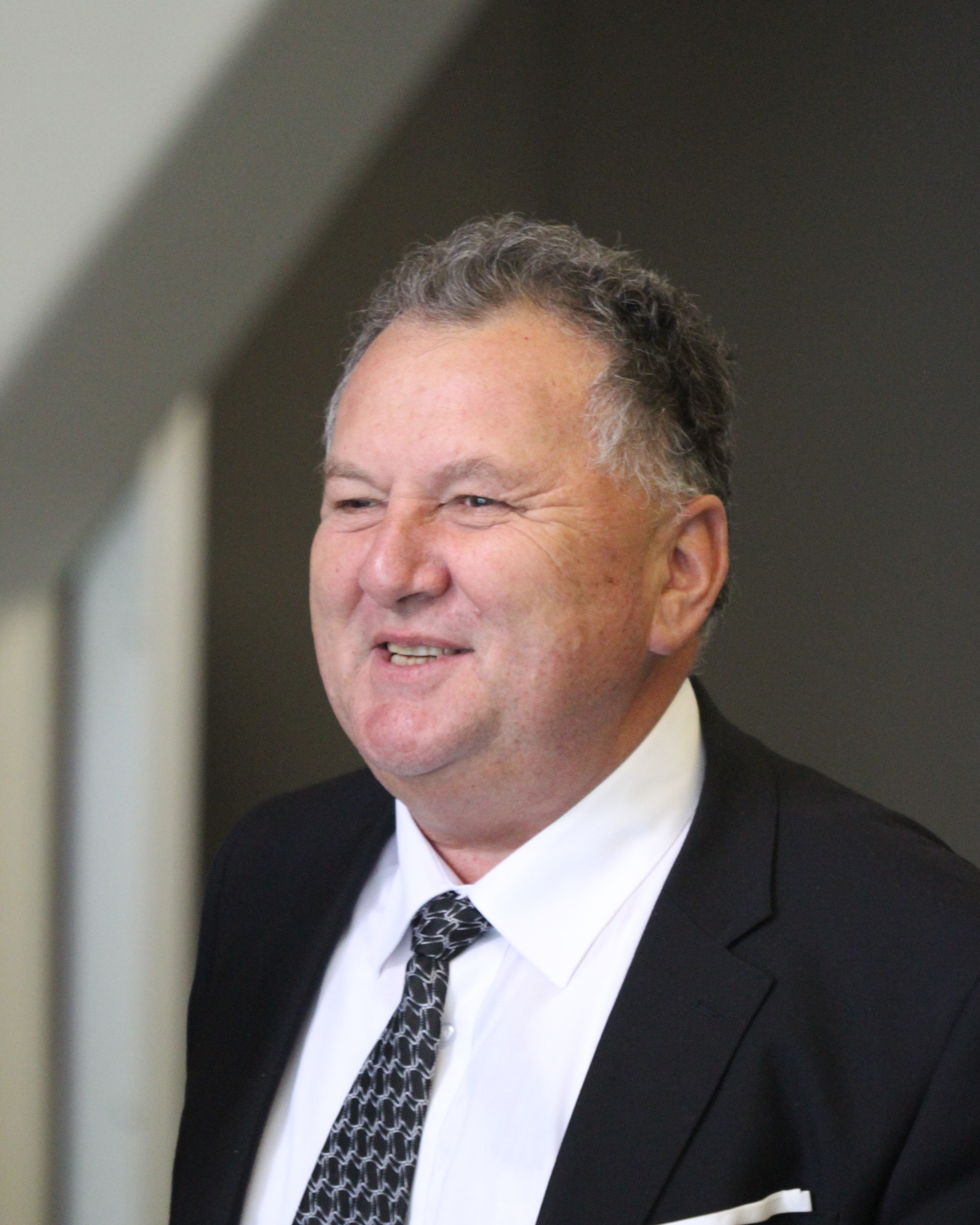
Shane Jones

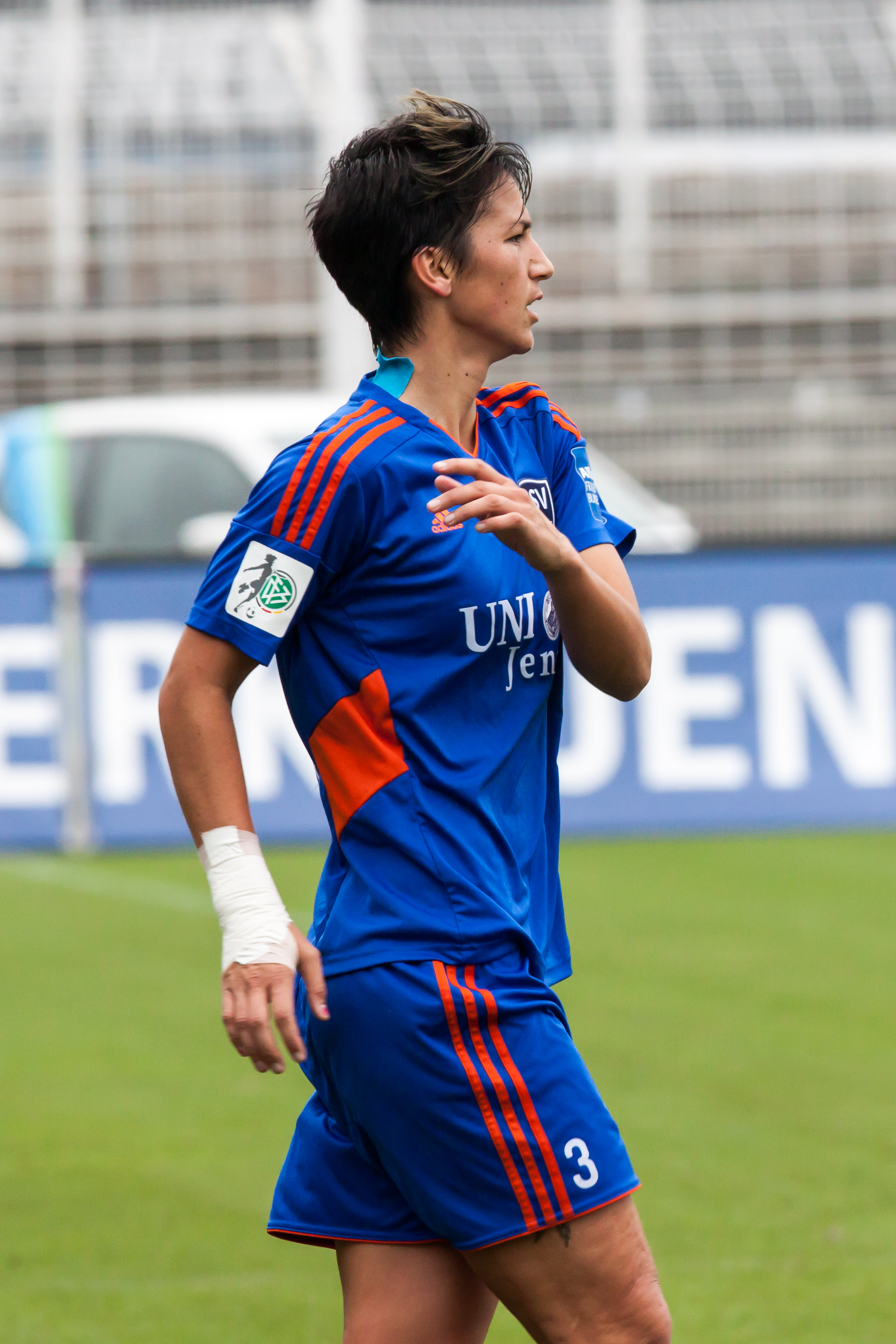
Abby Erceg

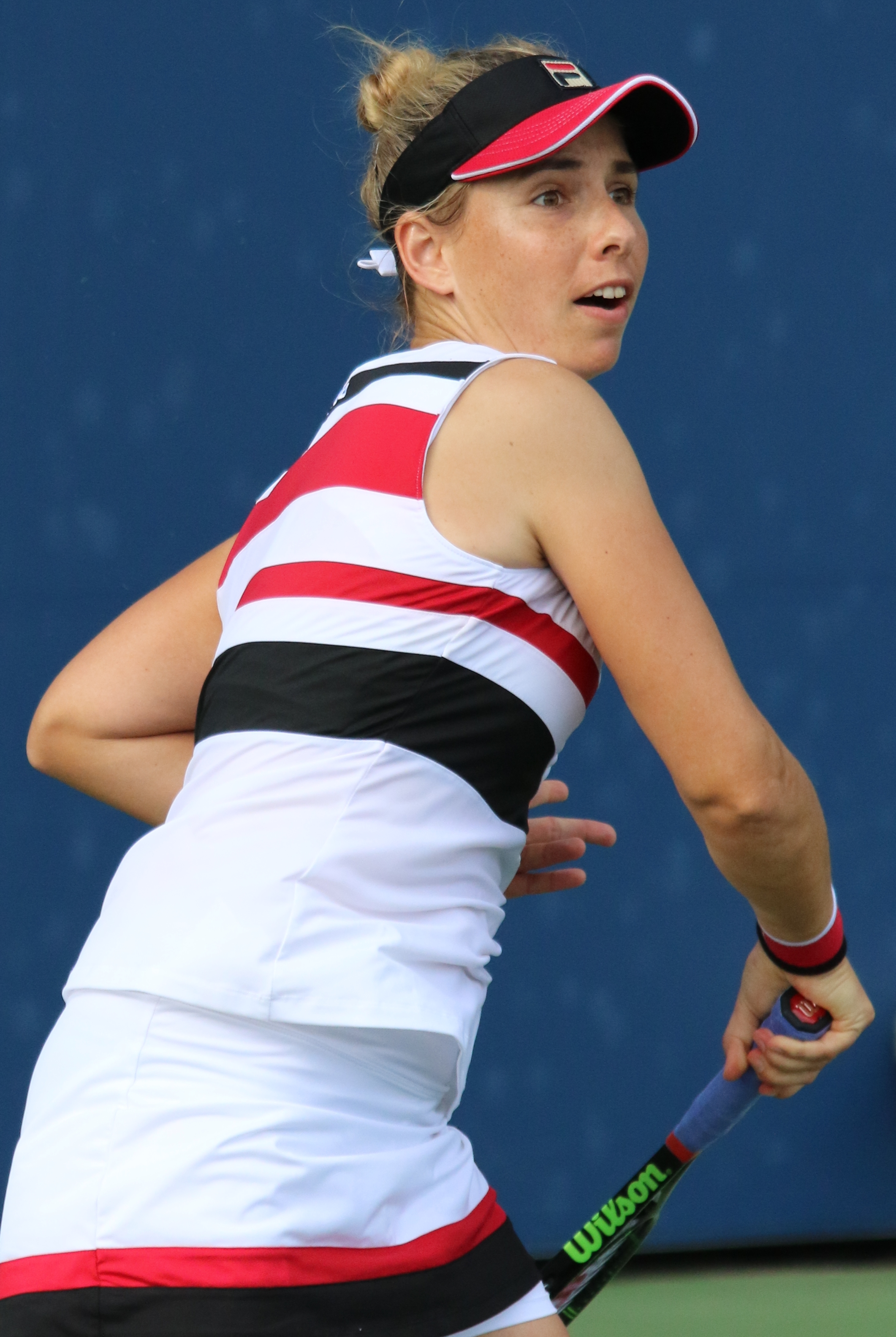
Marina Erakovic

=== Academics ===
- Jadranka Travaš-Sejdić
- James Belich - Historian

=== Arts ===
==== Actors ====
- Jessie Lawrence

==== Architecture ====
- Stephen Jelicich - Founder of Jasmax/ JASMaD
- Ivan Mercep - Founder of Jasmax/ JASMaD

==== Artists ====
- Billy Apple
- Milan Mrkusich
- Shannon Novak

==== Comedians ====
- Rose Matafeo
- Nick Rado

==== Film & Television ====
- Samantha Scott - Director

==== Literature ====
- Amelia Batistich - Author
- Peter Dragicevich - Author
- Sonja Yelich - Poet

==== Musicians ====
- Nick Afoa
- Kevin Borich
- Milan Borich (of the band Pluto)
- Tina Cross
- Maria Dallas
- Brad Devcich (Fast Crew)
- Lorde (Ella Yelich-O’Connor)
- Peter Posa
- Mike Perjanik
- Desna Sisarich
- Peter Urlich
- Margaret Urlich

=== Business ===
- Richard Chandler and Christopher Chandler - Investment companies
- Ana Tzarev - Businesswoman and artist
- Jim and Rosemari Delegat - Delegat Group Ltd - Delegat and Oyster Bay wine labels
- Michael Erceg - Founder of Independent Liquor, now known as Asahi Beverages (NZ) Ltd.
- Sir George Fistonich - Founder of Villa Maria Estates and Čuvar Winery.
- Huljich family - Food manufacturing, property, new business startups, finance and movie-making
- Steve Jurkovich - Kiwibank CEO
- Dame Rosanne Meo - Businesswoman
- Nobilo family and Nikola Nobilo - The founder of Nobilo wines
- Peter and Tyler Rakich - Founders of Dynasty Sports (sports clothing brand), and sponsors of the NZ Rugby league team, NZ Warriors, Auckland City FC and Croatian rugby team
- Talley family - Owners of Talley's Group
- Peter Vela and the Vela family - Owners of Vela fishing and Pencarrow stud (thoroughbred racehorse breeding)

=== Fashion ===
- Vinka Lucas - Bridalwear designer
- Tony And Margie Milich - Sabatini clothing label.
- Peter Nola - Founder of clothing label "Peppertree Fashions" which was prominent in the 1960s to 1980s.
- Valentin Ozich - Founder of clothing label "I Love Ugly".

=== Journalism ===
- Tony Ciprian - radio and television presenter
- Simon Mercep - radio and television presenter

=== Law ===
- Brian Dickey - Crown Solicitor Auckland
- Dame Helen Winkelmann - Chief Justice of New Zealand

=== Politics ===
- Sir James Belich - Former Mayor of Wellington
- Camilla Belich - Member of Parliament
- Frana Cardno - Former Mayor of Southland District
- Fred Gerbic - Former Member of Parliament
- Shane Jones - Member of Parliament and cabinet minister
- Connie Purdue - Trade unionist
- Jules Radich - Former Mayor of Dunedin
- Clem Simich – Former Member of Parliament
- Millie Srhoj - First Mayor of the Far North District
- Dame Mira Szaszy - Maori Leader
- Tanya Unkovich – New Zealand First politician
- Dame Rangimarie Naida Glavish - Maori Leader

=== Religion ===
- Denis Devcich - Director of the Mother of God Brothers
- Antony Sumich (born 1964) – Catholic priest of Priestly Fraternity of Saint Peter and the Diocese of Auckland; rugby union and cricket international (for Croatia)

=== Sports ===
==== Cricket ====
- Anton Devcich - BLACKCAPS representative
- Joseph Yovich
- Ben Lister
- Dusan Hakaraia - also Croatia rugby representative

==== Football ====
- Abby Erceg – NZ Football Ferns football player
- Tony Laus - All Whites football player
- Stefan Marinovic - All Whites football player
- Paul Urlovic - All Whites football player
- Ivan Vicelich - All Whites football player
- Chris Zoricich – All Whites football player
- Ivan Vuksich - Football Administrator

==== Motor sport ====
- Robbie Francevic - motor racing driver
- Paul Radisich – world touring car champion

==== Rugby ====
- Anthony Boric – All Blacks player
- Kevin Boroevich – All Blacks player
- Frano Botica – All Blacks / NZ rugby league/ Croatia Rugby
- Mark Carter – All Blacks player
- Matt Cooper – All Blacks / Croatia Rugby
- Percy Erceg – All Blacks player
- Sean Fitzpatrick - All Blacks player
- Wayne Pivac - Rugby Union coach
- Ron Urlich – All Blacks player
- Ivan Vodanovich – All Blacks player / coach

==== Rugby League ====
- Frano Botica – All Black/ NZ rugby league/ Croatian Rugby
- Tony Kriletich - NZ rugby league

==== Tennis ====
- Marina Erakovic
- Onny Parun
- Lulu Sun

==== Other ====
- John Garea - Professional wrestler
- Frank Nobilo - golf player
- John Radovonich – NZ hockey player
- Anna Simcic - swimmer
- Nick Unkovich - lawn bowls player
- Michaela Sokolich-Beatson - netball player for the Northern Mystics and Silver Ferns
- Tom Vodanovich - NZ basketball player
- Greg Yelavich - shooter

=== Winemakers ===
- Brajkovich - Kumeu River Wines
- Delegat
- Fistonich - Founder of Villa Maria Wines, Čuvar Winery and Obliix label
- Mazuran
- Nobilo
- Vuletic - Providence Wines
- Yukich - founder of Montana Wines now known as Brancott Estate

=== Fictional Croatian New Zealanders ===
- Fisher Brankovic — Filthy Rich (television)
- Darijo Doslic — Westside (television)
- Draska Doslic — Outrageous Fortune (television)
- Mila Jizovich - bro'Town (television)
- Johnny Marinovich — Shortland Street (television)
- Nina — Broken English (film)

== See also ==
- Croatian Australians
- Croats
- Dargaville
- European New Zealanders
- Europeans in Oceania
- Immigration to New Zealand
- List of Croats
- Pākehā

== Literature ==
Books

- Božić-Vrbančić, Senka (2008). Tarara: Croats and Maori in New Zealand : memory, belonging, identity. Otago University Press. ISBN 978-1-877372-09-4..
- Trupinić, Damir (2009). New Zealand Croatian Immigrant Press 1899-1916. LAP Lambert Academic Publishing. ISBN 978-3-8383-0743-5.

Works

- Stoffel, Hans-Peter (2009). "From the Adriatic Sea to the Pacific Ocean. The Croats in New Zealand" (PDF). Asian and African Studies. 18 (2): 232–264.
- Krtalić, Maja; Hebrang Grgić, Ivana. Cultural societies and information needs : Croats in New Zealand
