= La Fleur du Cap =

House on the French Riviera

La Fleur du Cap, originally known as Villa Socoglio, is a house on the waterfront in Cap Ferrat, on the French Riviera.

The house was built in 1880 as Villa Socoglio by the son of an arms dealer.

It was later home to the Duchess of Marlborough, King Leopold III, Charlie Chaplin and David Niven.

The villa was used in the filming of the 1982 movie, Trail of the Pink Panther.

Since at least 1999, it has been home to Ana Tzarev and Robert Chandler, the parents of New Zealand-born, billionaires Christopher Chandler and Richard Chandler who bought the house.
