= Mercep =

Mercep, also Merćep and Merčep, is a surname. Notable people with the surname include:

- Ivan Mercep (1930–2014), New Zealand architect
- Mihailo Merćep (1864–1937), Serbian flight pioneer
- Simon Mercep (born 1960), New Zealand television and radio journalist
- Tomislav Merčep (1952–2020), Croatian politician and paramilitary leader
