= 151 Cambridge Terrace, Christchurch =

Commercial building in Christchurch, New Zealand

151 Cambridge Terrace
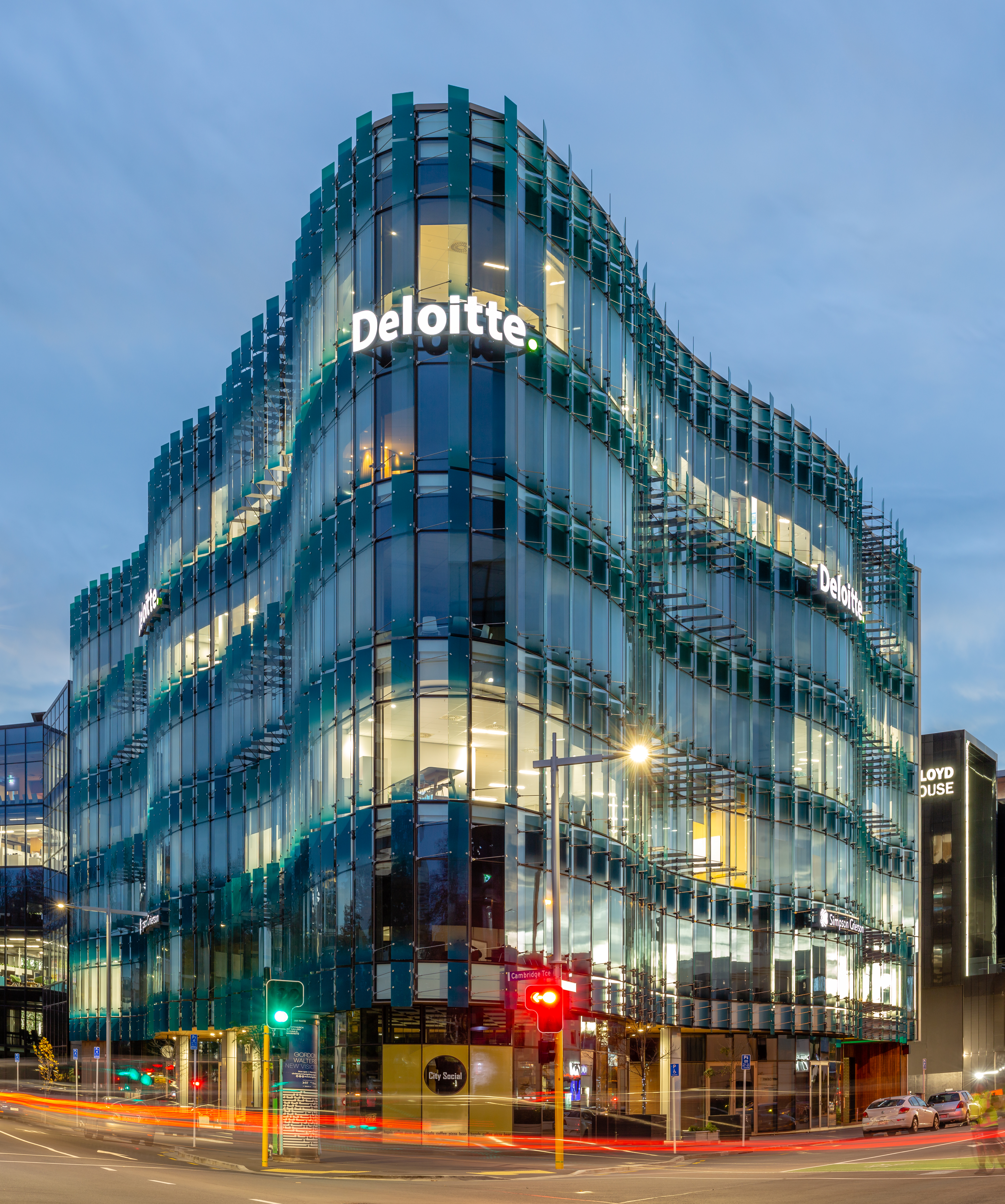
- The building in 2019
- Interactive map of the 151 Cambridge Terrace area

General information
- Type: Commercial
- Architectural style: Contemporary
- Location: Christchurch Central, New Zealand
- Coordinates: 43°31′48″S 172°37′59″E
- Year built: 2014
- Client: Westwood Limited

Technical details
- Floor count: 7
- Floor area: 7350 square meters

Design and construction
- Architecture firm: Jasmax
- Developer: Stephen Collins

151 Cambridge Terrace (also known as the Deloitte Building) is a contemporary office building in central Christchurch, New Zealand, located along the Avon River at the intersection of Cambridge Terrace and Gloucester Street. The building was completed in 2014 as one of the earliest commercial projects in the city following the 2011 Christchurch earthquake, and is the first building in New Zealand to use Triple Pendulum base isolation.

151 Cambridge Terrace is notable for its strong seismic engineering features and distinctive design, with a curved, undulating series of blue-tinted glass fins surrounding the exterior. It was developed in 2013 by the late Stephen Collins for Westwood Limited, and architecturally designed by Jasmax. Construction was completed in 2014.

As of 2026, the building is branded by Deloitte, which operates on the upper two levels of the property. Three other levels are also fitted for commercial office use, and the ground floor used is used for retail space.

== Construction and design ==
151 Cambridge Terrace was developed for Westwood Limited in 2013 as a project by property developer Stephen Collins. It was architecturally designed by Jasmax. Work on the site began at the end of August 2013, and construction was completed the following year. It has 7 floors (including ground level and basement) with a total size of 7350 square metres.

Prior to the 2011 earthquake, the land had been the site of a 7-storey building with a Greek restaurant, which was demolished. Collins had owned several buildings which were lost to the earthquake, and scouted the land while looking for a site for a new building. He considered the location "special" due to its surrounding views and riverside location. 151 Cambridge Terrace was one of Collins' last projects before his death five years later.

Earthquake resilience and safety was a primary consideration of the design. The building has the equivalent of an IL4 rating for seismic resilience, built upon Triple Pendulum base isolation which allows for 500 millimetres of movement in any direction. It is the first building in New Zealand constructed to use this system.

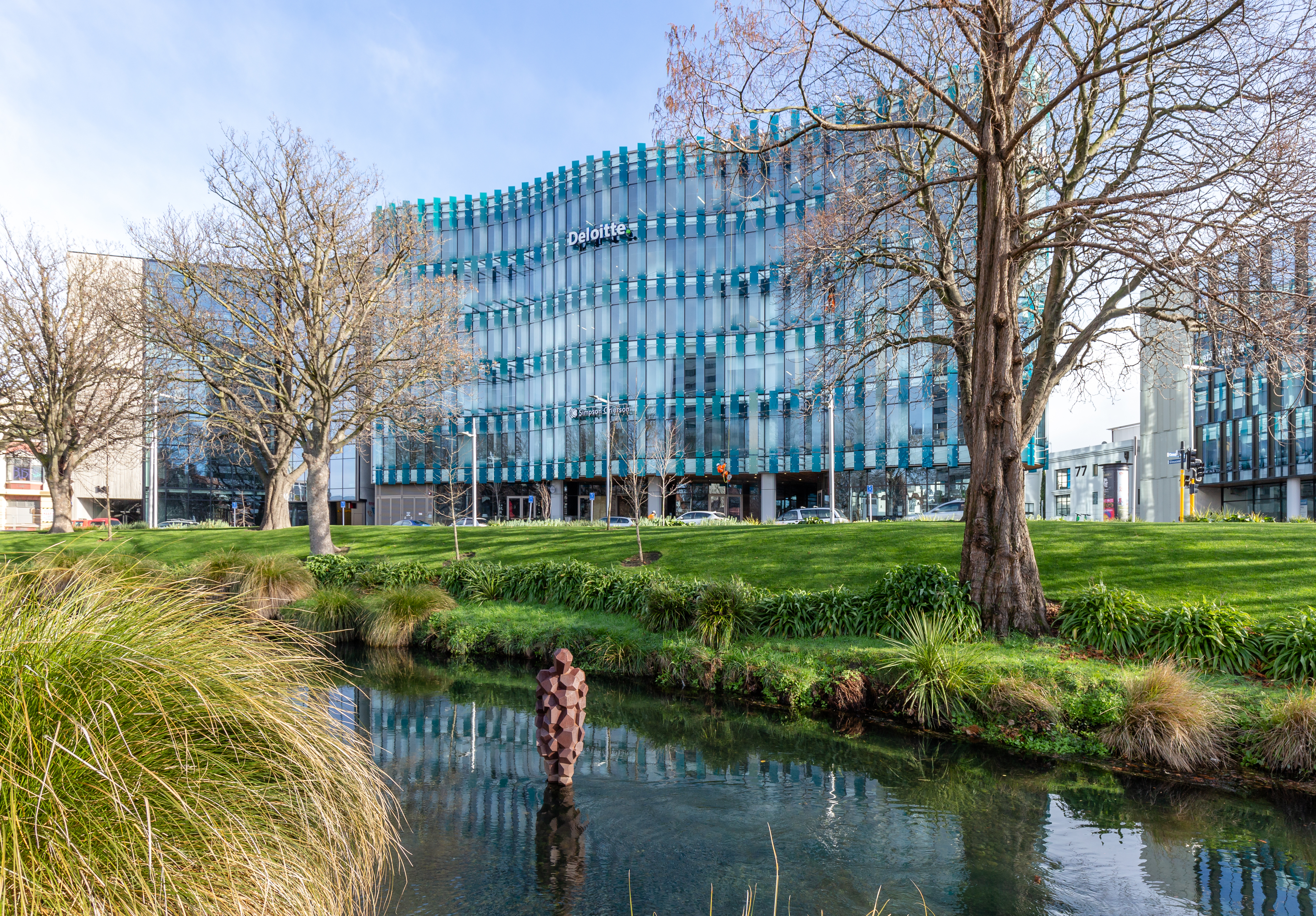
The building seen from the river

The facade of the building has a curved, undulating shape made from fins of tinted blue glass. The design is inspired by the adjacent Avon River, and was intended to reduce the bulky size of the building and feel "vibrant". Energy efficiency was also a strong focus; the design used extensive modelling to engineer its thermal performance, and the glass panels using a special glazing to help regulate temperature. The building also has a heat exchange system.

Despite the unique shape, the structural grid of the building is rectangular. This allowed for extensive prefabrication, and reduced construction time compare to other building methods.

=== Awards ===
151 Cambridge Terrace won three awards for Alutech at the 2015 WANZ Glass Awards including Supreme Winner. In the 2015 PCNZ Awards, the building was awarded Merit in the Hays Commercial Office category.

== Tenants ==
Deloitte was announced as the first tenant in 2015, and has remained in the building since then, occupying the upper two floors. A cafe, bar, and restaurant operate from the ground level, accessible via a laneway. In 2020, office space in the building was also rented by Fusion 5, Horncastle Investments, and QBE Insurance.
