= Bratska Sloga =

- Cover of the first edition of the Bratska Sloga.
- Type: Fortnightly Newspaper
- Format: Broadsheet
- Publisher: Antun Bulat
- Founded: 15 May 1899
- Language: Croatian; English
- Ceased publication: 28 June 1899

Bratska Sloga (lit. 'Brotherly Unity') was the first newspaper serving Croatian immigrants in Auckland. Established in May 1899 by Antun Bulat, the newspaper published four editions, mainly in the Croatian language. The newspaper ceased publication in June 1899.

== History ==
=== Inception ===
In the 1890s, Croatian migrants relocated to Auckland from other parts of New Zealand, driven by prejudice that forced them to leave the Kauri gumfields. In 1899, Antun Bulat, a Croatian immigrant to New Zealand, established the newspaper Bratska Sloga to serve the growing Croatian community in Auckland. Bulat explained his motivation, writing—

In starting the present journal, several considerations have influenced us in the action we have taken. There are a large number of so-called “Austrians” now in the Auckland Province — quite three thousand in number—and all are industrious workers, each producing something towards our total exports required for the payment of Government expenses and the interest upon our National Debt.

Among all this large number of healthy working people there are very few who can make themselves understood in English; and even the few who have some knowledge of that language can express themselves very indifferently in it, and have no means of knowing the current news of the day, or to become acquainted with the views and actions of our public men. It seemed to us necessary that some means should be provided to these people expressed in a language understood by them, especially when they are willing to support such a medium of conveying knowledge to them.

On 23 May 1899, a social gathering was held amongst Auckland's Croatian community to celebrate the inauguration of Bratska Sloga. The Austrian Consul to New Zealand was present, and stated—

As the 'Bratska Sloga', will be printed in the Croatian and English languages; I hope it will bring you in closer contact with the English, and promote peace and good the so widely different nationalities.

=== Decline ===
Bulat financially struggled with the newspaper from the beginning, relying on a small subscriber base. The National Library of New Zealand refers to the newspaper's 'fatal blow' as a libel suit brought by Ivan Šegetin, an editor of the rival newspaper Danica. The libel suit concerned statements published in Bratska Sloga referring to Šegetin as a donkey and to his "wild life and his loafing about the streets of Auckland." The case was dismissed without costs. The newspaper published its last issue on 28 June 1899.

== Publications ==
In the newspaper's four editions, the Bratska Sloga published predominantly on the kauri gum market, promotion of the newspaper and short texts in English aimed to explain Croatian nationality as Croatians were often incorrectly identified as 'Austrian' in Colonial New Zealand.

Bratska Sloga was an important source of information for Croatian immigrants, many of whom did not speak English. The newspaper would regularly publish the current prices for kauri gum in the Croatian language to help other Croatians be fairly paid for their work.
