= Selak =

Selak is a surname. Notable people with the surname include:

- Frane Selak (born 1929), Croatian music teacher alleged to have escaped death several times
- Fred N. Selak (1865–1926), The Hermit of Grand Lake, Colorado, murdered by hanging
- Marija Selak (born 1982), Croatian politician
- Mate Selak (born 1987), Croatian footballer
- Mirko Selak (born 1978), Croatian footballer
