= Polish New Zealanders =

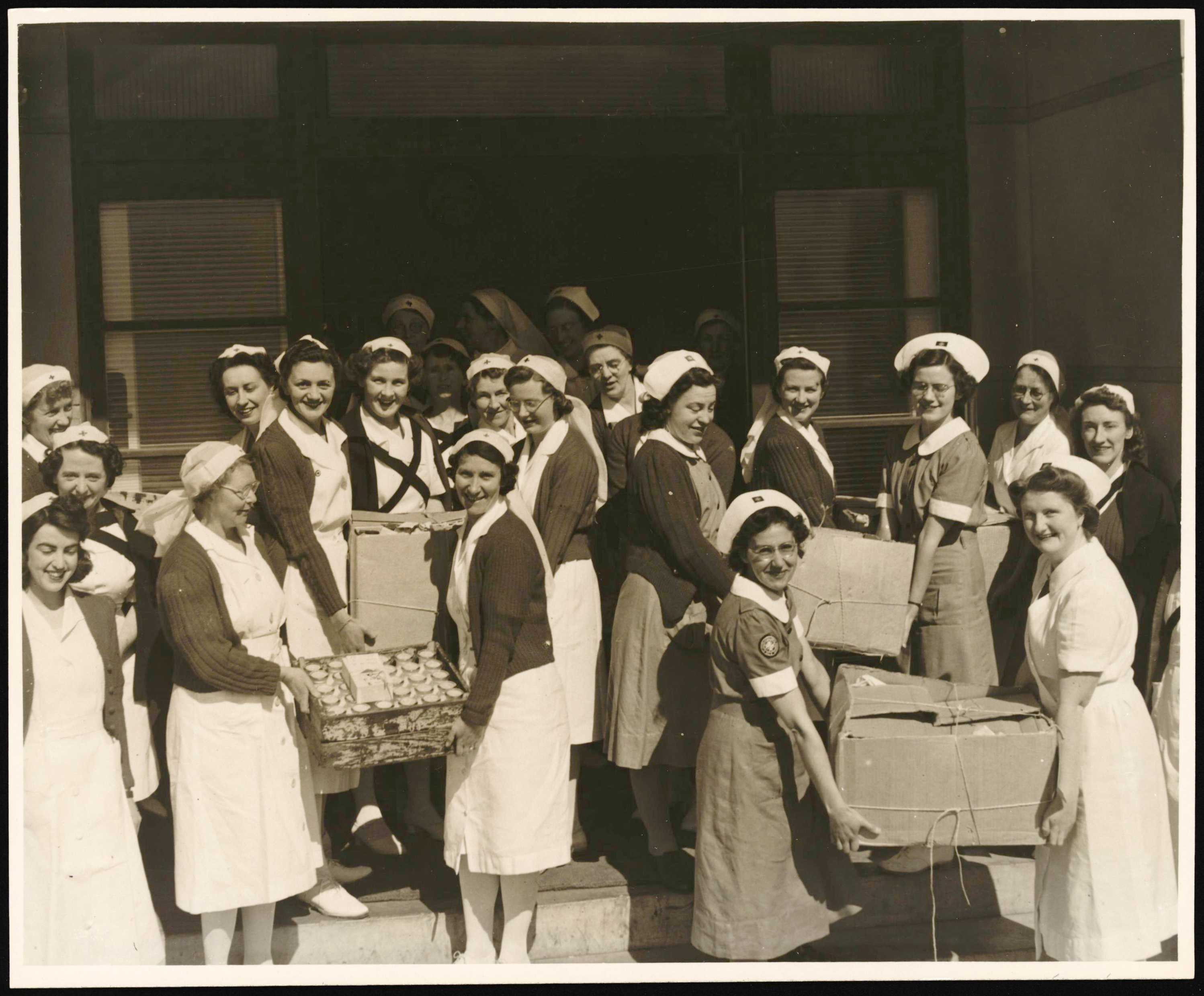
- Polish refugees in Wellington, 1944

Total population
- 2,871 (2018)

Regions with significant populations
- Auckland Region, Wellington Region, Canterbury region

Languages
- New Zealand English · Polish

Religion
- Catholic, Jewish

Related ethnic groups
- Poles, Polish diaspora

Polish New Zealanders refers to New Zealand citizens or residents of full or partial Polish ancestry, or Polish citizens living in New Zealand. The 2018 census counted 2,871 New Zealanders who claim Polish ancestry.

== History ==
Small numbers of Polish people began to arrive to New Zealand throughout the 19th century. Among these, many were among the "Brogdenites" employed to build stretches of New Zealand's main railway lines. Many of these settled in small towns close to the rail line such as Greytown (now Allanton) in Otago.

During World War I and World War II, many Polish people became refugees and were relocated to other countries such as New Zealand.

In 1948, The Polish Association was founded by Polish immigrants, to support and to provide a sense of community and togetherness.

== Notable Polish New Zealanders ==
- John Blumsky, broadcaster
- Mark Blumsky, politician
- Helen Schamroth, craft artist and author.
- Mirosław Złotkowski, wrestler
- Simon Mercep, journalist
- Count Geoffrey Potocki de Montalk
- Dallin Watene-Zelezniak
- Łukasz Buda
- Zoi Sadowski-Synnott, snowboarder
- Lisa Warrington
- Kazimierz Wodzicki
- Alfred Ngaro, politician
- Krystyna Tomaszyk, writer and social activist

== Gallery ==
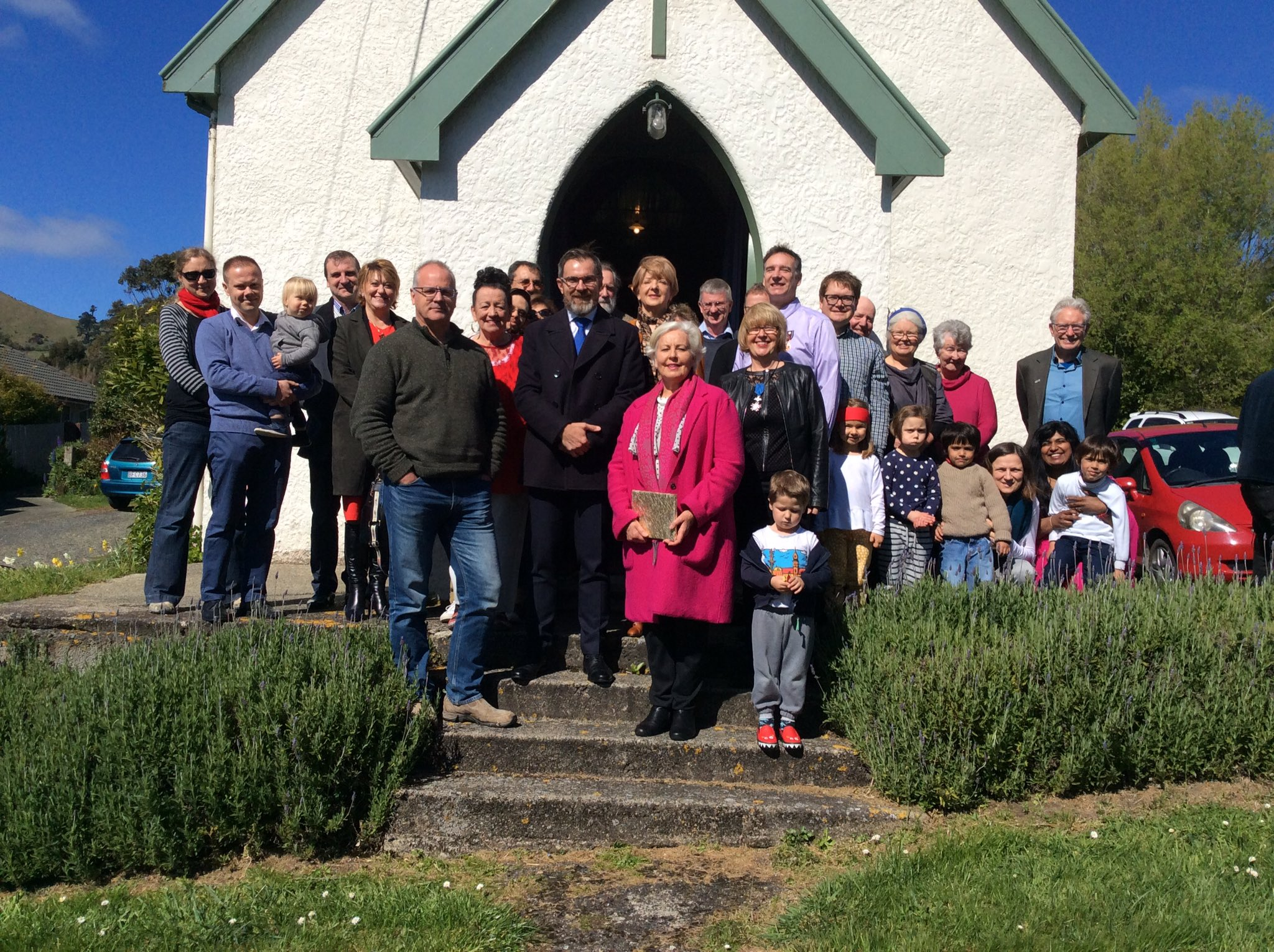
Poles in Dunedin, 2020

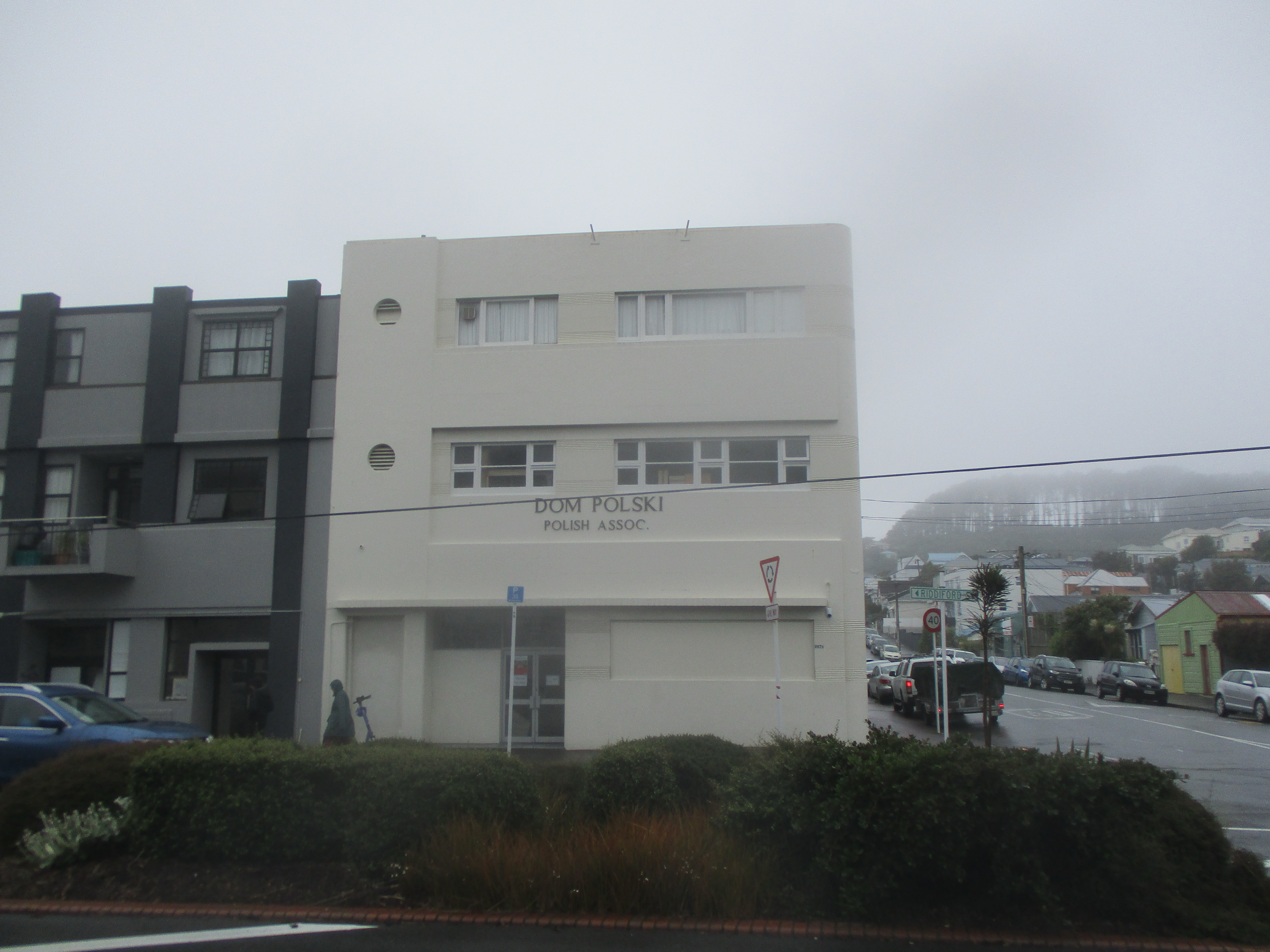
Polish club in Wellington

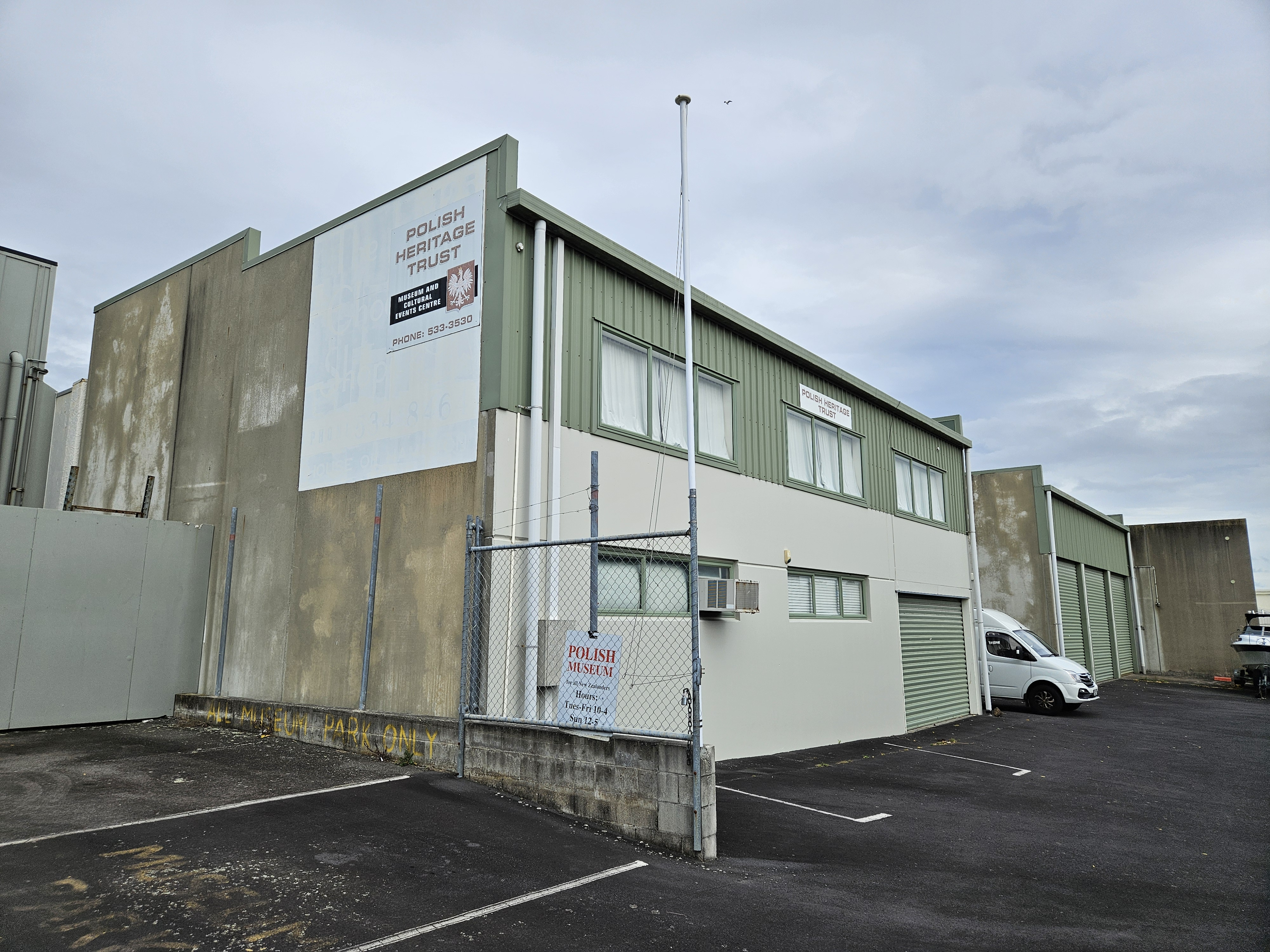
The Polish Heritage Museum in Howick, Auckland

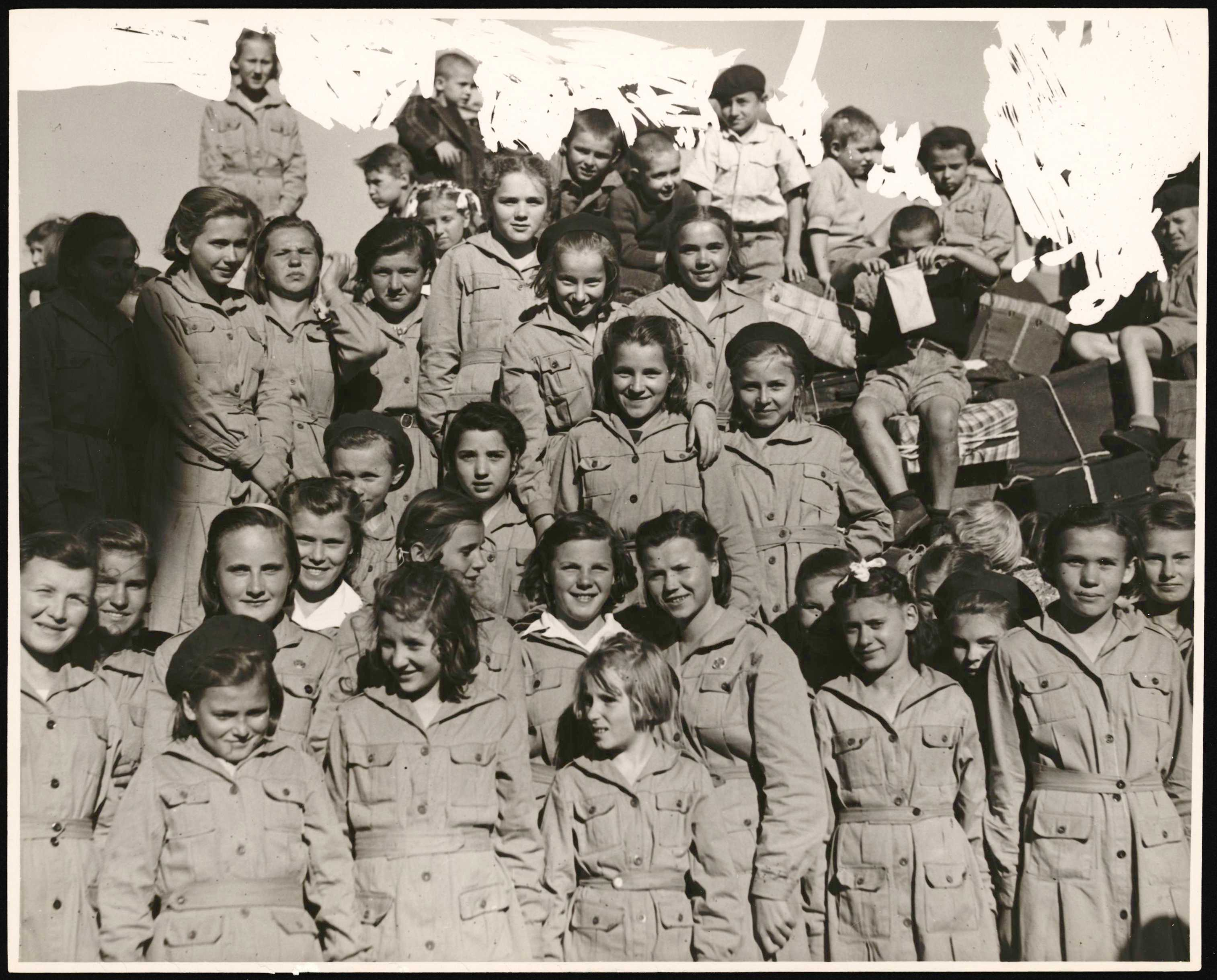
Polish refugees arriving at Wellington and at the Polish Children's Camp at Pahiatua, 1944

== See also ==
- New Zealand–Poland relations
- Polish diaspora
- Immigration to New Zealand
- European New Zealanders
- Europeans in Oceania
- Polish Australians
