= Jasmax =

New Zealand architectural firm

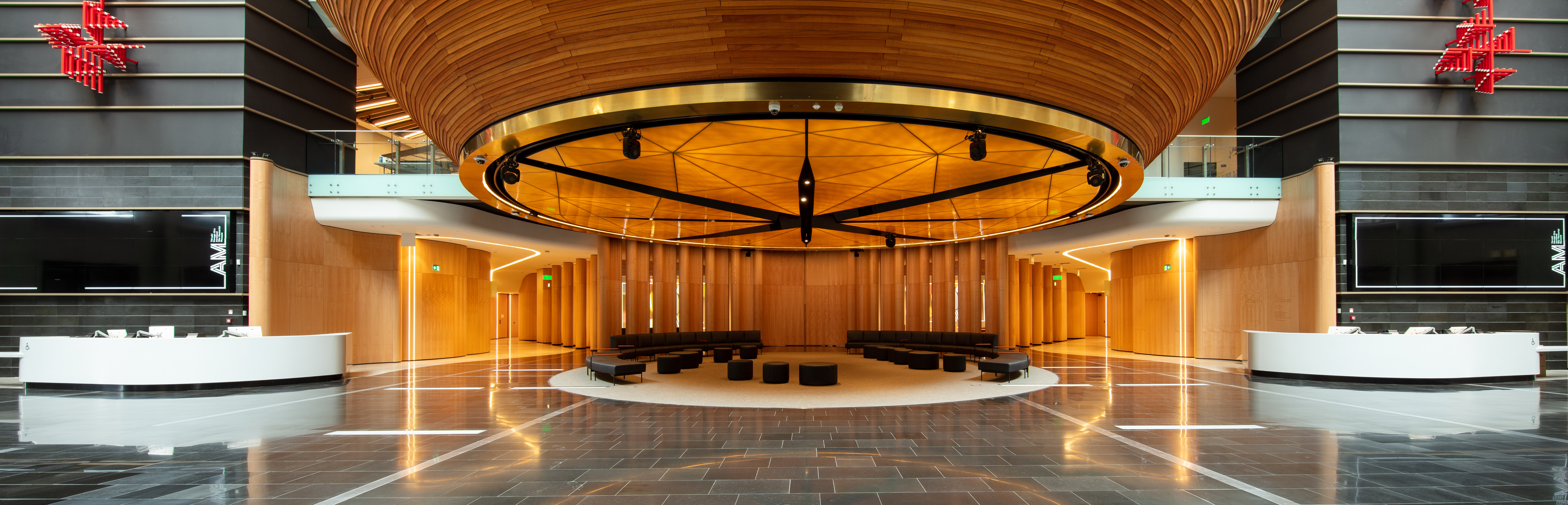
- Te Ao Mārama South Atrium, Auckland Museum

Practice information
- Location: Auckland, Wellington, Christchurch, Sydney and Melbourne

Website
- https://jasmax.com/

Jasmax (formerly known as JASMaD) is a multidisciplinary architecture and design firm with offices across New Zealand and Australia. Their projects range from architecture, interior design and landscape architecture to building conservation, urban design and sustainable architecture.

== Formation ==
Jasmax has been in operation since 1963, providing services in architecture, interior design, landscape architecture and urban design. Originally 'JASMaD', it was founded by five directors, Stephen A. Jelicich, John Austin, Graham Smith, Ivan Mercep and Rodney Davies. In 1989, JASMaD merged with two smaller architectural practices, Bossley Cheshire Architects (Pete Bossley and Pip Cheshire) and Gibbs Harris (Richard Harris and David Gibbs), and became Jasmax. From 1989 to 1996, Bossley took on the role of director of Jasmax, and Cheshire from 1989 to 2003.

== Practice ==
Their head office is in Auckland, New Zealand and they have about 260 staff, and they are internationally recognised for their work in cultural design. Jasmax has opened two studios in Australia, in Sydney in 2022, and then in Melbourne in 2025. In 2019, Sjoerd Post was the CEO and Matthew Glubb was a principal of the firm. In 2023, Matthew Glubb was appointed as CEO.

=== Indigenous design ===
In 2015, Jasmax established the Waka Māia team, made up of Māori and Pasifika designers. The name Waka Māia, refers to a courageous and hopeful journey forward and was gifted by Haare Williams. Elisapeta Heta is noted as a core member of the teams establishment and development.

A new manifesto in 2019 redirected Jasmax's design philosophy, 'to elevate the cultural design conversation in New Zealand'. The practice's approach to Indigenous design works alongside Māori, Pasifika and First Nations communities from project conception to completion.

=== Sustainability ===
In 2020, Jasmax launched their Pathway to Net Zero Carbon Design which aims to achieve carbon neutral buildings by 2030. Their sustainability goals are part of a broader design philosophy, to strengthen connections between culture, nature and design. In 2023, the University of Auckland's B201, designed by Jasmax received a 6 Green Star rating from the New Zealand Green Building Council, making it the highest- rated Green Star certified building in New Zealand.

== Selected projects ==
Completed	Project name	Image	Location	Awards	Notes
1979	Samoa House		Auckland	New Zealand Institute of Architects National Award	Head architect Ivan Mercep visited the district of Falealili in Poutasi, Samoa where he learnt about fale construction.
1993-1997	Auckland Town Hall refurbishment		Auckland	Regional Award	Project managed by Ian Bowman and won a BOMA Building Award and a NZIA Architectural Award.
1998	Museum of New Zealand Te Papa Tongarewa		Wellington	Awarded NZ Building of the Decade, Architecture NZ readers poll, May/ June 2000, Te Kāhui Whaihanga NZ Institute of Architects Regional Award 1999 Te Kāhui Whaihanga NZ Institute of Architects Branch Award 1999	Pete Bossley was the Jasmax director at the time.
2000	Auckland Civic Theatre conservation		Auckland		Designed with Salmond Reed Architects and received the 2000 NZIA-Resene Colour Award and Local Branch Award.
2003	Auckland City Hospital		Auckland		Designed with Australian firm, McConnel, Smith and Johnson (now Conrad Gargett).
2004	Southland Hospital		Invercargill		Designed with McConnel, Smith and Johnson and McDowell Architects.
2011	Eden Park, South Stand		Auckland		Designed with international architecture firm, Populous.
2011	Forsyth Barr Stadium		Dunedin		Designed with Populous.
2013	ASB North Wharf		Auckland		Designed with BVN.
2014	Waikato Hospital Acute Services Building, Older Persons and Rehabilitation Building, and Meade Clinical Centre		Hamilton		Designed with CJM Architects (Chow Hill and MSJ).
2014	Te Kura Whare		Tūhoe, Tāneatua		Designed by Ivan Mercep and was awarded a Living Building Challenge Certification.
2016	Burwood Hospital Redevelopment		Christchurch		Designed with Klein and Sheppard & Rout.
2017	Auckland University of Technology Mana Hauora Building		Auckland	Designers Institute of New Zealand Best Design Awards (in Built Environment)	
2018	AUT Ngā Wai Hono (School of Engineering, Computer and Mathematical Sciences Building)		Auckland	Designers Institute of New Zealand Best Design Awards (in Built Environment / Private, Public and Institutional Spaces / Public Development - over $10 million)	
2019	Western Springs College Ngā Puna o Waiōrea Redevelopment		Auckland	Designers Institute of New Zealand Best Design Awards (in Environmental Graphics) Ted McCoy Award for Education at the 2020 New Zealand Architecture Awards.	
2019	B:Hive, Smales Farm		Auckland	Designers Institute of New Zealand Best Design Awards (in Workplace Environments / Over 1000 square metres)	
2019	The Ernest Rutherford Building (RRSIC - Rutherford Regional Science and Innovation Centre)		Christchurch	Designers Institute of New Zealand Best Design Awards (in Built Environment / Private, Public and Institutional Spaces / Public Development - over $10 million)	
2020	The University of Auckland B405 Faculty of Engineering Te Herenga Mātai Pūkaha)		Auckland	Designers Institute of New Zealand Best Design Awards (in Private, Public and Institutional Spaces / Public Development - over $10 million)	
2020	Te Ao Mārama South Atrium refurbishment at Auckland War Memorial Museum Tāmaki Paenga Hira		Auckland	Designers Institute of New Zealand Best Design Awards (in Private, Public and Institutional Spaces / Public Development - over $10 million) NZIA Public Architecture Award 2021 NZIA Heritage Award 2021	Designed with FJMT and designTRIBE.
2021	Refurbishment of the heritage-listed University of Otago dental school's Walsh Building,		Dunedin		
2003, 2022	Britomart Transport Centre and Chief Post Office refurbishment		Auckland		Designed with Mario Madayag and in collaboration with Auckland Council.
2023	University of Auckland B201 Building		Auckland	Designers Institute of New Zealand Best Design Awards (in Repurposed Spaces / Adaptive Reuse / Over 150 square metres, and Private, Public and Institutional Spaces / Public Development - over $10 million)	Highest- rated Green Star certified building in New Zealand.
2023	University of Waikato The Pā		Hamilton	Designers Institute of New Zealand Best Design Awards (in Private, Public and Institutional Space / Public Development - over $10 million, and Toitanga)	Designed with Architectus and designTRIBE.
2024	BNZ Place		Wellington	Commercial Architecture Award	
2024	Tōtara Haumaru at North Shore Hospital		Auckland		
2024	AUT Tukutuku		Auckland	Education Award	
2024	George Street Retail Quarter		Dunedin	Planning & Urban Design Award	
2026	Te Puna Mahara - Cromwell Memorial Events Centre		Cromwell		
Ongoing	Waikato Regional Theatre		Hamilton		Designed with Charcoalblue.
Ongoing	City Rail Link		Auckland	Cultural Identity, World Architecture Festival WAFX (2019) Infrastructure Award, World Architecture Festival WAFX (shortlisted, 2019)	The first New Zealand project to be recognised by the World Architecture Festival WAFX for Cultural Identity. A collaboration between Jasmax and Grimshaw Architects. Rau Hoskins, of designTRIBE and people Alt Group were also involved, as well as from the start eight Māori groups specific to the region (mana whenua).
Ongoing	Scott Base redevelopment		Antarctica		Designed with Hugh Broughton Architects.
