= Polish Australians =

Ethnic group

- People with Polish ancestry as a percentage of the population in Australia divided geographically, 2011

Total population
- 209,284 (by ancestry, 2021) (0.8% of the Australian population); 45,884 (by birth, 2021)

Regions with significant populations
- Melbourne, Sydney, Adelaide, Perth, Brisbane, Geelong, Canberra

Languages
- Polish · Australian English

Religion
- Predominantly Roman Catholicism, minority Judaism or none

Related ethnic groups
- Polish Americans, Polish Canadians, Polish New Zealanders

Polish Australians refers to Australian citizens or residents of full or partial Polish ancestry.

In 2021, 45,884 Australian residents declared that they were born in Poland. The Australian states with the largest Polish populations were Victoria (14,202), New South Wales (13,830), and Queensland (5,740). The Polish-born Australian resident population predominantly were Australian citizens (86.9%), Roman Catholic (66.8%) and used Polish at home (70.4%). Around 77% arrived in Australia before 2000.

== History ==
The first Pole known to have arrived in Australia was Joseph Potaski, who was sent there as a convict from the United Kingdom of Great Britain and Ireland in 1803.

A prominent Pole, Paul Edmund Strzelecki arrived at Sydney on 25 April 1839. At the request of the governor of New South Wales, Sir George Gipps, Strzelecki made a geological and mineralogical survey of the Gippsland region in present-day eastern Victoria, where he made many discoveries including gold in 1839. That year, Strzelecki and a crew set out from Sydney on an expedition into the Australian Alps. In 1840, he climbed the highest peak on mainland Australia and named it Mount Kosciuszko. He reached Melbourne on 28 May 1840. From 1840 to 1842 Strzelecki explored Tasmania (then known as Van Diemen's Land). Having travelled 11,000 kilometres (7,000 miles) through New South Wales, Victoria and Tasmania, examining the geology along the way Strzelecki returned to England, where he was awarded in May 1846 the Founder's Medal of the Royal Geographical Society.

The first settlers from Poland arrived in South Australia in 1856 and settled in the Clare Valley region in a place later called Polish Hill River. The first mass migration happened in the late 1940s when large groups of displaced persons who could not return to communist Poland (the Polish People's Republic) migrated to Australia after World War II, including soldiers from the Polish Independent Carpathian Brigade. Between 1947 and 1954, the Poland-born population increased from 6,573 to 56,594 people.

In the early 1980s there was further Polish migration to Australia. The emergence of the Solidarity trade union movement and the declaration of martial law in Poland at the end of 1981 coincided with a further relaxation of Polish emigration laws. During the period 1980–1991 Australia granted permanent entry to a large number of Polish migrants, many arriving as refugees who soon got a reputation for being hard working. In 1991, an independent, voluntary organisation was established to inform the Australian public about issues related to Polish history, politics, society and culture. The immediate trigger for establishing the Australian Institute of Polish Affairs was strong public interest in the historic changes that swept Central Europe in 1989 and led to the collapse of communism. Some Australians have Polish-Jewish roots. They organised the Association of Polish Jews and Their Descendants. Both organisations are based in Melbourne.

Mount Kosciuszko, the highest mountain in Australia (not including its external territories), was named by the Polish explorer Count Paul Edmund Strzelecki in 1840, in honour of the Polish and American national hero and hero of the Kościuszko Uprising and the American Revolutionary War General Tadeusz Kościuszko, because Strzelecki perceived resemblance to the Kościuszko Mound in Kraków.

== Demographics ==
Capital city	Population with Polish ancestry (2021 census)	Proportion of total population
Sydney	42,014	0.8%
Melbourne	52,559	1.1%
Brisbane	18,499	0.7%
Perth	19,925	0.9%
Adelaide	18,155	1.3%
Canberra	5,035	1.1%

Year	Polish Born Population
1947	6,573
1954	▲56,594
1961	▲60,049
1966	▲61,641
1971	▼59,700
1976	▼56,051
1981	▲59,442
1986	▲67,676
1991	▲68,964
1996	▼56,389
2001	▼54,724
2006	▼52,254
2011	▼48,677
2016	▼45,370
2021	▲45,884

=== Language ===
In Australia, 45,379 people reported speaking Polish at home in 2021. Victoria had the highest number of Polish speakers at 13,670, followed by New South Wales at 13,502. The median age for Polish speakers was between 50 and 54 in 2021. 67.5% of people that spoke Polish were born in Poland, 25.6% in Australia. In 2021, approximately 50% of Polish-born Australians had arrived in Australia between 1981 and 2000, inclusive.

=== Religion ===
71.8% of Polish speakers in Australia identify as Catholic, with 18.4% identifying with no religion in 2021.

=== Education ===
38.1% of Polish-born Australians have a bachelor's degree or above as of 2021, compared to 22.7% for those born in Australia.

=== Income ===
The median household income for Polish-born Australians in 2021 was $1656, compared with $1936 for the total overseas-born Australian population and $1635 for those born in Australia.

== Melbourne ==
Melbourne, Victoria, has the largest Polish population in Australia which comprises a large part of the city's eclectic multicultural community. In 1986, the state of Victoria accounted for 36.4 percent of Australia's Polish-born population compared with 25.8 percent of the national population. A vast majority of these immigrants reside in Melbourne's south-east or north-west, in suburbs such as Rowville, St. Albans, Sunshine, Dandenong and Yarraville, as well as the City of Greater Geelong.

The largest portion of Melbourne's Polish population immigrated to the city after the Second World War, with the second largest influx occurring in the 1980s. However, Melbourne's Polish history goes back much further than the 1940s, with a Polish Relief Fund and a Polish Society both established in the city as early as 1863. A "Polish Festival @ Federation Square" has been yearly event there since 2004.

== See also ==
- Australia–Poland relations
- Polish diaspora
- Immigration to Australia
- European Australians
- Europeans in Oceania
- Polish New Zealanders
