= Christopher Chandler (businessman) =

New Zealand-born businessman

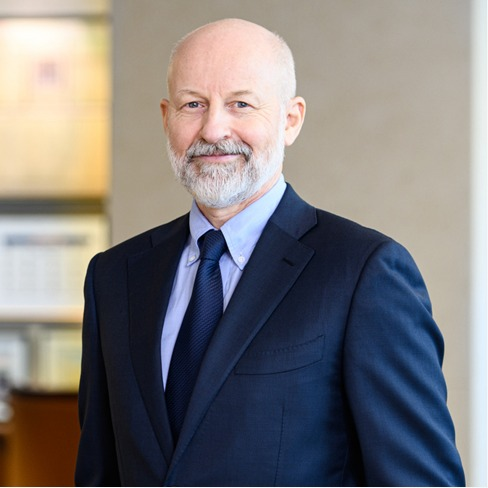
- Born: 1960 (age 65–66); Matangi, New Zealand
- Education: University of Auckland
- Known for: Founder of Dubai-based investment company Legatum
- Parent(s): Robert Chandler; Ana Tzarev
- Relatives: Richard Chandler (brother)

Christopher Lincoln Chandler (born January 1960) is a New Zealand businessman and founder of Dubai-based investment company Legatum.

As of 2013, Forbes estimated his net worth to be $1 billion. Chandler has been called "one of the world's greatest contrarian investors" by Fortune magazine. Chandler is a funder of the Legatum Institute.

== Early life ==
Born in Matangi, Chandler is one of the three sons of beekeeper Robert Chandler and his wife, businesswoman Marija Chandler, known as Ana Tzarev, who launched and operated Chandler House, a department store in Hamilton, New Zealand. He attended the University of Auckland, earning a degree in law in 1982.

In 1982, Christopher and his older brother, Richard, took over the business and expanded it to ten stores, adding fashion design, manufacturing and real estate, before starting to look for international investment opportunities.

== Career ==
=== Sovereign Global ===
In 1986, the brothers formed investment firm Sovereign Global in Monaco to focus on transitioning industries in Russia, Latin America and Eastern Europe. The business operated by investing in assets which it felt were mispriced in times of uncertainty. The Chandler brothers were among the first and biggest investors in the emerging markets of Brazil, the Czech Republic, and Russia. According to Fortune Magazine, Sovereign “bet big on commercial real estate at the time of the transition in Hong Kong from British to Chinese control, when most of the world was profoundly pessimistic about the city's prospects.”

Together, the brothers deployed a “narrow and deep” investment strategy, steering large portions of a portfolio into few high conviction trades. This strategy runs counter to the diversification strategies typically deployed in the modern investment industry. Christopher’s role in Sovereign’s investment strategy was to project the firm’s investment targets forward five or ten years, with Richard Chandler saying, "No one I know is better at that than Christopher."

One of the company's first major investments was in Hong Kong real estate, a market which investors had fled after the signing of the Sino-British Accord. The company also invested in the Brazilian telecommunications industry, just after the country came out of hyperinflation, and in Russia, just after the fall of communism.

During the Asian banking crisis, the brothers made significant investments in both Japan, including taking stakes in UHJ Holdings, Mizuho Financial Group, Sumitomo Mitsui Banking Corp., and Mitsubishi Tokyo Financial Group. The brothers also took a stake in South Korean refiner SK Corp., where they unsuccessfully tried to "oust" its CEO and Chairman, Chey Tae-won, after Tae-won was convicted and imprisoned on charges of accounting fraud.

In 2002, the brothers were the fourth largest investor in Gazprom, the Russian state-controlled gas company. Their representative on the Board, Boris Fyodorov, was poisoned by cyanide, which allegedly may have been the result of their campaign to clean up the company's governance by appointing the first independent director to the state-controlled gas company.

=== Legatum ===
In 2006, Christopher founded Dubai-based Legatum Capital as an independent venture separate from his brother. The company was co-founded with Mark Stoleson, Philip Vassiliou and Alan McCormick.

Legatum is a private, multibillion-dollar investment firm that puts money into companies in developing countries as well as the world's capital markets. In April 2012, Legatum acquired its own building in the Dubai International Finance Centre. Legatum also co-owns the UK media channel GB News under the umbrella of a holding company, All Perspectives Ltd.

Legatum committed US$50 million to build the Legatum Center for Development and Entrepreneurship at MIT, which was later renamed MIT Kuo Sharper Center for Prosperity and Entrepreneurship, in 2008. The Center has partnered with the MasterCard Foundation and other organizations to cultivate leadership, entrepreneurship, and innovation to benefit vulnerable populations.

Legatum created the END Fund in 2012, a private philanthropic foundation with a mission to control and eliminate neglected tropical diseases. Legatum also became co-founders of the Freedom Fund, which it started in 2013, with Minderoo Foundation’s Walk Free initiative and Humanity United, to end global slavery labour.

Chandler and his partners then launched the Luminos Fund, a charitable organization founded in 2016 to bring educational initiatives to third world countries. The company committed US$10 million over 5 years to the Luminos Fund to support these efforts.

In 2025, Legatum launched the Resilio Fund, a $500 million fund to help tackle humanitarian crises. In partnership with the Oxford Character Project at the University of Oxford and the Human Flourishing Program at Harvard University, they also launched the leadership development programme ‘Leading with Character’ in the same year.

Connected to his role as the Chairman of Legatum, Chandler is closely associated with the formation of the international conservative grouping, the Alliance for Responsible Citizenship, and the Prosperity Institute (formerly known as the Legatum Institute).

== Libel lawsuits ==
In 2018, British MPs, including Bob Seely, accused Chandler of links to Russian intelligence, repeating allegations previously published in media reports derived from a dossier. During a parliamentary debate, Steve Baker defended Christopher Chandler against allegations made by other MPs.

Chandler has consistently rejected these claims and the accusations have since been proven false. Following these accusations, Chandler sued Donald Berlin and his company Investigative Consultants, Inc., the original source of the allegations, for US$15 million in a libel suit. The case was initially dismissed on administrative grounds due to the statute of limitations, but in 2021, Chandler successfully revived the libel suit against Berlin in appeals court.

In September 2023, the court granted summary judgment for Chandler, finding the underlying allegations to be false and defamatory as a matter of law. Chandler was awarded $8,000,001 million in damages by the court after the jury found in his favour in 2024.

In May 2022, Chris Bryant, who joined Seely in making the allegations in 2018, apologised to Chandler in Parliament for the distress his false claims caused and in July that year, confirmed in the UK High Court that the allegations were untrue. Chandler commented that he was "delighted to be able to put these bizarre and outrageous lies behind us."

== Personal life ==
Chandler has maintained a low public profile and few photographs exist of his likeness, nor much information about his personal life. He enjoys windsurfing, water-skiing and riding motorcycles. Chandler has built computers and written software programs in his spare time.

The Chandler brothers bought La Fleur du Cap in Cap Ferrat for their parents. It was previously owned by David Niven and Charlie Chaplin.

Chandler became a citizen of Malta, a member-state of the European Union, in 2016. He did so through the Maltese government's IIP scheme. When the news of Chandler's Maltese citizenship became public in 2018, one MEP expressed disapproval of his dual citizenship. It subsequently became clear that Chandler was not a Brexiteer, and his application for Maltese citizenship was made before the UK referendum in June 2016. Charles Moore, writing for the Telegraph in May 2018, wrote that Chandler "has never advanced political views or, according to Legatum employees, expressed opinions about Brexit".
