= Simon Mercep =

New Zealand journalist

- Born: 1960 (age 65–66)
- Occupations: Television and radio journalist
- Parents: Ivan Mercep (father); Halina Mercep (mother)

Simon Mercep (born 1960) is a New Zealand television and radio journalist. After a long career at Radio New Zealand and other news outlets, he was reporting for 1News in 2024.

== Biography ==
Mercep is the son of noted architect Ivan Mercep, and is of mixed Croatian and Polish descent.

Starting his career in 1983 as a trainee journalist with Radio New Zealand, his early career included reporting in Australia, Canada and the United Kingdom. He also worked as a print journalist in Cyprus.

In 1989 Mercep returned to New Zealand to take on producing and reporting roles with TVNZ. In the 1990's he reported for One Network News and Holmes. Among his assignments were the 1994 Los Angeles earthquake and the 1995 Ruapehu eruptions. After another spell in London with the BBC in the late 1990s he returned to TVNZ, to spend a decade as a reporter for consumer affairs programme Fair Go, and for Sunday. In 2011 Mercep joined Radio New Zealand's Morning Report as a co-host with Geoff Robinson, and in 2014 moved to the presenter job on Afternoons. In his last year on Morning Report while reporting with Geoff Robinson, the programme won a 2014 New Zealand Radio Award for best weekly or daily feature.

He left RNZ in July 2015, and took a break from daily news journalism.

In 2016 Mercep produced and co-hosted Crave!, a film and music review podcast and website, with Steve McCabe.

In 2022 he returned to a reporter role with 1News in Auckland. He was reporting for 1News in April 2024.

== Personal life ==
He is married to Maree Mercep, who is also known as Maree Davies, an academic at the University of Auckland.

== See also ==
- List of New Zealand television personalities
- Croatian New Zealanders
- Polish New Zealanders
