= Asian and African Studies =

- Discipline: Area studies
- Language: English
- Edited by: Karol Sorby

Publication details
- History: 1965-present
- Publisher: Slovak Academic Press (Slovakia)
- Frequency: Biannually

Standard abbreviations
- ISO 4: Asian Afr. Stud.

Indexing
- ISSN: 2585-8793 (print); 1335-1257 (web)

Links
- Journal homepage

Asian and African Studies is a biannually published peer-reviewed academic journal that was established in 1965 by the Institute of Oriental Studies of the Slovak Academy of Sciences in Bratislava. covering research on Africa and Asia. It covers aspects of oriental culture, linguistics, and history, with stress being laid on methodology.

The editor-in-chief is Karol R. Sorby (Comenius University).

== Abstracting and indexing ==
The journal is abstracted and indexed in:

- GEOBASE
- Scopus
- MLA - Modern Language Association Database
- Worldwide Political Science Abstracts
- Historical Abstracts
