= Mate Selak =

Croatian footballer

Personal information
- Date of birth: 9 April 1987 (age 39)
- Place of birth: Croatia
- Height: 1.78 m (5 ft 10 in)
- Position: Midfielder

Youth career
- 2005: Omladinac Vranjic
- 2006: Hajduk Split

Senior career*
Years	Team	Apps	(Gls)
2006-2007	Hajduk Split	4	(0)
2006	→ Šibenik (loan)	2	(0)
2007	→ Solin (loan)	8	(1)
2007	→ Imotski (loan)	6	(0)
2008	RNK Split		
2008-2009	Konavljanin		
2010	Kamen Ivanbegovina		
2010-2011	Uskok	12	(0)
2011-2012	Domžale	2	(0)
2012	→ Radomlje (loan)	2	(0)
2012	Adriatic	7	(3)
2013	Val Kaštel Stari	4	(0)
2013	Hrvace	10	(1)
2014	FC Dietikon		
	Orkan Dugi Rat	11	(0)
- * Club domestic league appearances and goals

Mate Selak (born 9 April 1987 in Croatia) is a Croatian retired footballer.

== Career ==
At the age of 15, Selak left Croatia and trained with A.S. Roma in Italy, Barcelona in Spain, Karlsruher SC and Hertha BSC in Germany and Girondins de Bordeaux in France.

On the 17th of April 2006, he made his first start for HNK Hajduk Split in the Croatian Eternal derby against GNK Dinamo Zagreb, which the former won 1–0. However, after head coach Luka Bonačić was beaten with a baseball bat, Selak was suspected of perpetrating the crime, which affected his career. After being released from HNK Hajduk Split, he played in the Croatian third division, in Slovenia, and the Swiss lower leagues. By 2014, he was in the Croatian fourth division.
