= Stephen Jelicich =

New Zealand architect and historian (1923–2015)

Stephen Jelicich ONZM
- Born: Stjepan Albert Jeličić; 1 March 1923; Sućuraj, Kingdom of Serbs, Croats and Slovenes (present-day Republic of Croatia)
- Died: 19 December 2015 (aged 92); Auckland, New Zealand
- Education: University of Auckland
- Occupation: Architect
- Spouse: Barbara Jean McLennan (m. 1958)
- Practice: Brenner Associates (1949–1958); JASMaD (1963–1989)

Stephen Albert Jelicich ONZM (1 March 1923 – 19 December 2015) was a New Zealand architect and historian. He was one of the founders of JASMaD, which grew to become one of New Zealand's largest architectural firms.

== Early life and family ==
Born Stjepan Albert Jeličić on 1 March 1923 in Sućuraj, Kingdom of Serbs, Croats and Slovenes (present-day Republic of Croatia), the son of Victor and Srećka Jeličić, the family emigrated to New Zealand in 1927. Stephen Jelicich became a naturalised New Zealander in 1928.

He was educated at Sacred Heart College, and later studied at Auckland University College, where he graduated with a Bachelor of Architecture degree in 1949. Jelicich married Barbara Jean McLennan in 1958.

== Architectural practice ==
In 1949, Jelicich formed Brenner Associates in Auckland with fellow architects Desmond Mullen and Ron Grant and designer Milan Mrkusich. As well as architectural work, the firm engaged in integrated interior, exhibition, lighting and furniture design. In 1950 they established Auckland's first modern design store, specialising in imported and local furniture, ceramics, woodwork and glass.

Brenner Associates was dissolved in about 1958, and Jelicich went into sole practice.

Around 1960, Jelicich formed the Architects Planning Group, with the aim of influencing planning issues in Auckland. He entered into partnership in 1963 with Rodney Davies, Ivan Mercep, John Austin and Graham Smith to form what would become JASMaD (later Jasmax, one of the largest architectural practices in New Zealand).

== Historian ==
Jelicich researched the history of Croatian immigrants to New Zealand and their descendants. His book, From distant villages: the lives and times of Croatian settlers in New Zealand, 1858–1959, was published in 2008. He was also a contributor to the Dictionary of New Zealand Biography.

== Death ==
Jelicich died in Auckland on 19 December 2015 at the age of 92. His wife, Barbara, died in 2025.

== Honours ==
In the 2003 New Year Honours, Jelicich was appointed an Officer of the New Zealand Order of Merit for services to architecture and the community. He was also a Fellow of the New Zealand Institute of Architects.
