= Ana Tzarev =

Croatian New Zealand artist and businesswoman

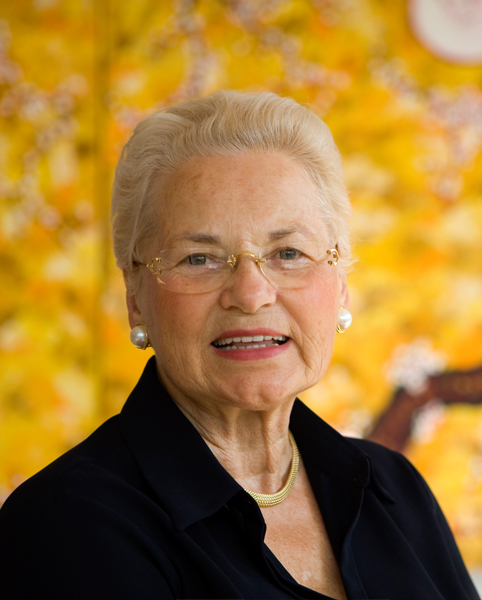
- Born: Marija Guina; 1937 (age 88–89); Trogir, Yugoslavia (now Croatia)
- Occupation: Artist
- Spouse: Robert Chandler
- Children: 3, including Richard Chandler and Christopher Chandler
- Website: Official website

Ana Tzarev (born 1937) is a Croatian New Zealand artist and businesswoman.

== Early life ==
Ana Tzarev was born Marija Guina in Trogir and her mother was Anka Carev. She "started out as a dressmaker". In 1956, she met Robert Chandler, whom she married in Split. They then moved to New Zealand, where she studied fashion design, and the two started the Chandler House department store, with Tzarev designing clothing sold there. Chandler House achieved national success, becoming a chain of ten stores, and was sold in 1986 for $10 million.

== Artistic career ==
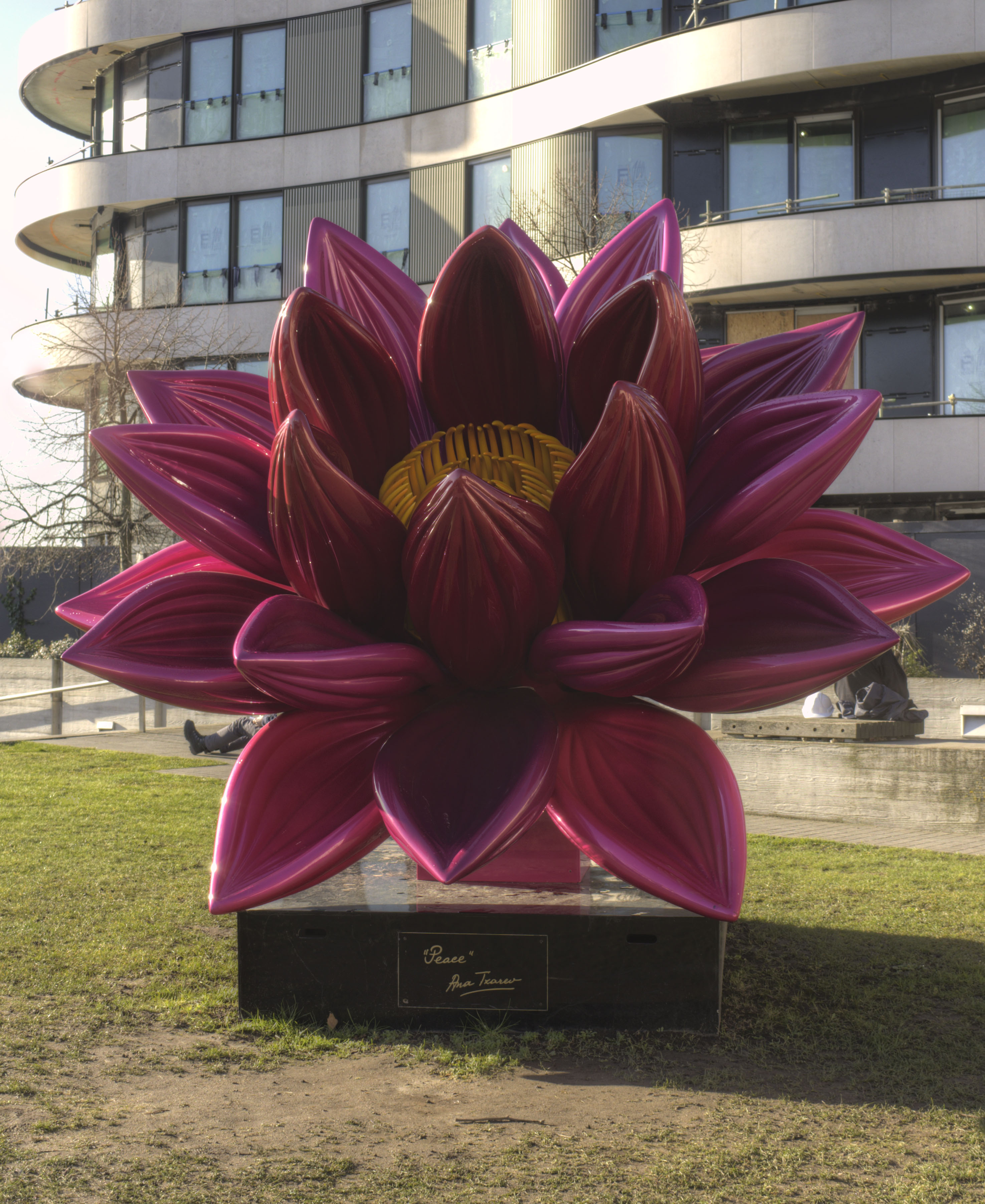
Peace by Ana Tzarev, displayed on Millbank, London

In December 2008, she opened the Ana Tzarev Gallery at 24 West 57th Street close to Fifth Avenue, New York. The 14,000 square feet, two-floor gallery was designed by James Harb Architects, and only shows her work, with the first exhibition being entitled Voyage of Discovery, even though she had "never sold a painting or held a public viewing of her work". The rent on the gallery space was $2 million a year, and her billionaire son Richard Chandler loaned her $4 million to launch the gallery.

Ana Tzarev Gallery, described in Art News and The New York Observer as a "vanity gallery", later closed. Others laud her work such as Alexander Borovsky, curator of Contemporary Art at the Russian Museum who wrote of her work ..."She [Ana Tzarev] has developed a powerful gestural style with an energy not unlike that of the post-impressionist era: an open colour, a three-dimensional brush stroke – or rather, a fiery haze of strokes drifting optically in space; a triumph of the de-reflective approach, driven towards capturing and mastering nature’s signals".

== Personal life ==
In 1956, she met Robert Chandler, beekeeper from New Zealand, and they married in Split. They had three sons, George, Richard and Christopher. The latter two ran a hedge fund business together, but now operate separately. Both are billionaires. After they sold their department store business, Tzarev and her husband gave the proceeds to their sons and retired to divide their time between Monaco and Thailand.
