= Ivan Mercep =

New Zealand architect (1930–2014)

Ivan Mercep ONZM
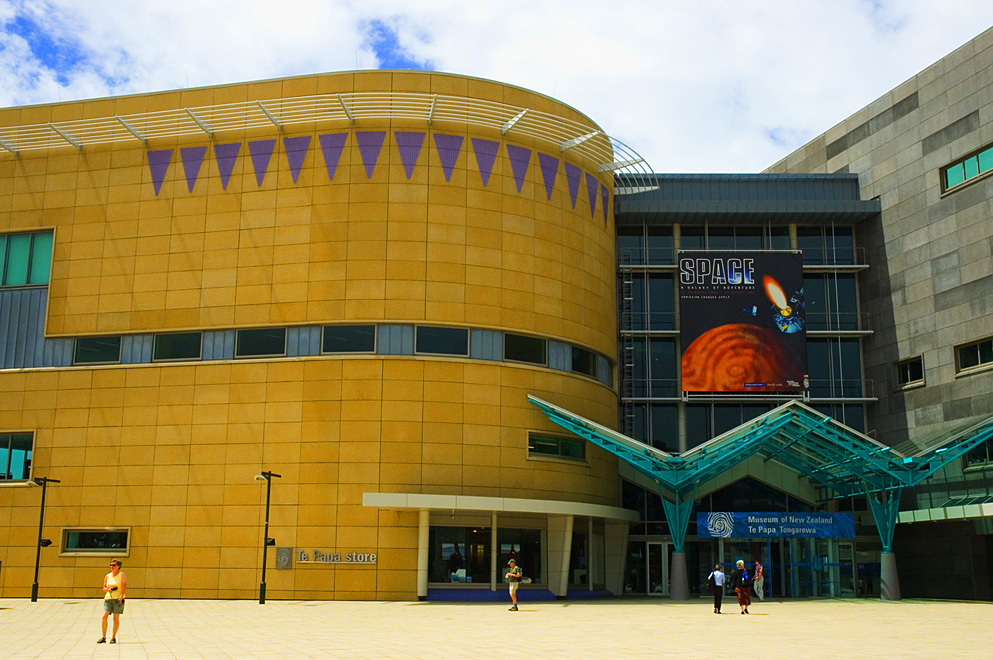
- Museum of New Zealand; Te Papa Tongarewa
- Born: 22 February 1930; Taumarunui, New Zealand
- Died: 8 April 2014 (aged 84); Auckland, New Zealand
- Education: University of Auckland
- Occupation: Architect
- Spouse: Halina Eva Trusz
- Relatives: Simon Mercep (son)
- Awards: NZIA Gold Medal (2008)
- Practice: KRTA (1960–1963); JASMaD (1963–1989); Jasmax (1989–2014)
- Buildings: Te Papa; Waikato Museum; Samoa House

Ivan Mercep ONZM (22 February 1930 – 8 April 2014) was a New Zealand architect. He received the NZIA Gold Medal in 2008.

== Early life and family ==
Born in Taumarunui in 1930 to a Croatian family, Mercep was educated at Sacred Heart College, Auckland and Auckland University College, from where he graduated with a Bachelor of Architecture in 1954. He married Halina Eva Trusz, and one of their sons is broadcaster Simon Mercep.

== Architectural practice ==
Following university, Mercep spent six years working and travelling overseas, before returning to New Zealand in 1960. After working with KRTA, he entered into partnership in 1963 with Rodney Davies, Stephen Jelicich and Graham Smith to form what would become JASMaD (later Jasmax, one of the largest architectural firms in New Zealand). In 1964, he became a registered architect in New Zealand. He helped design Hoani Waititi Marae in West Auckland and Waipapa Marae at the University of Auckland. Mercep was project architect for Samoa House / Maota Samoa on Auckland's Karangahape Road, designed to house the Samoan consulate-general, and completed in 1978. The building won a New Zealand Institute of Architects national award in 1980.

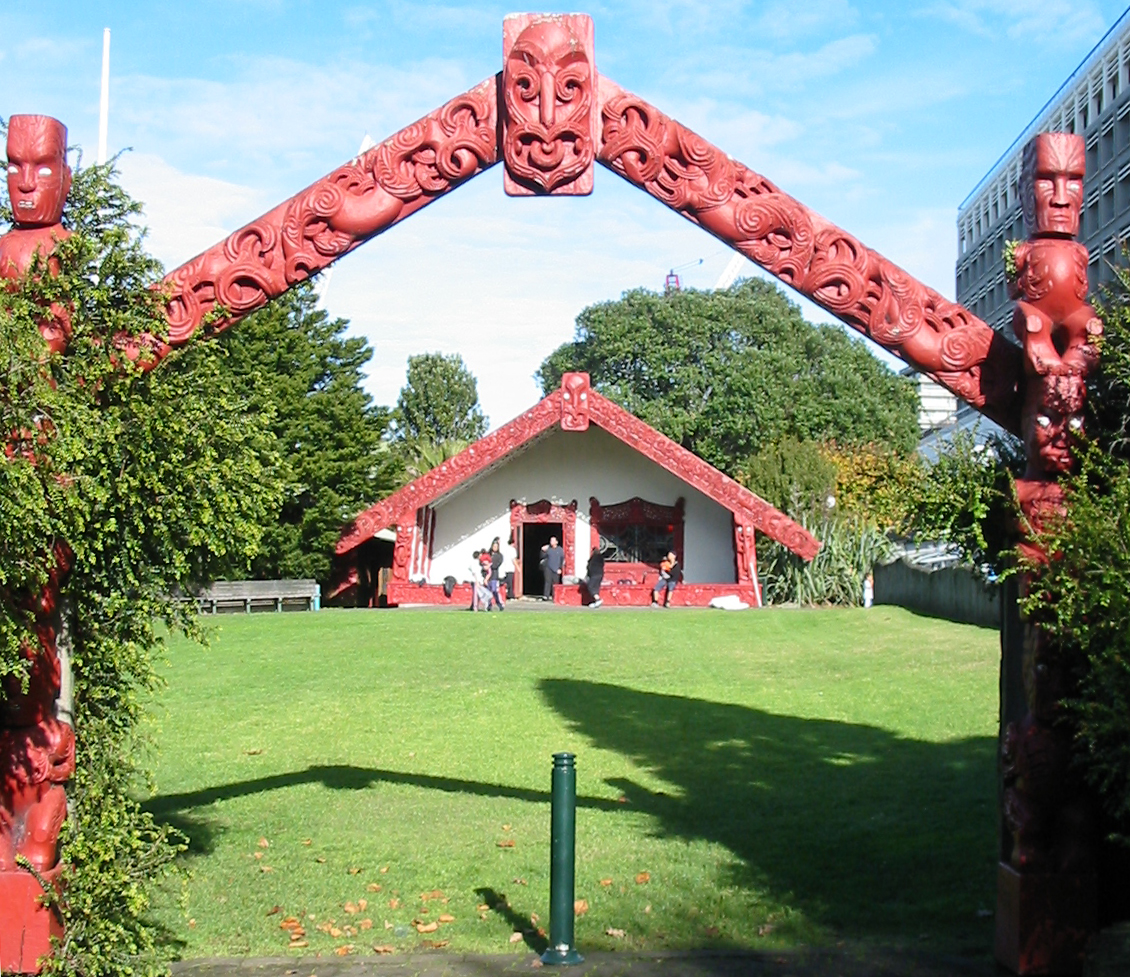
Waipapa Marae, University of Auckland

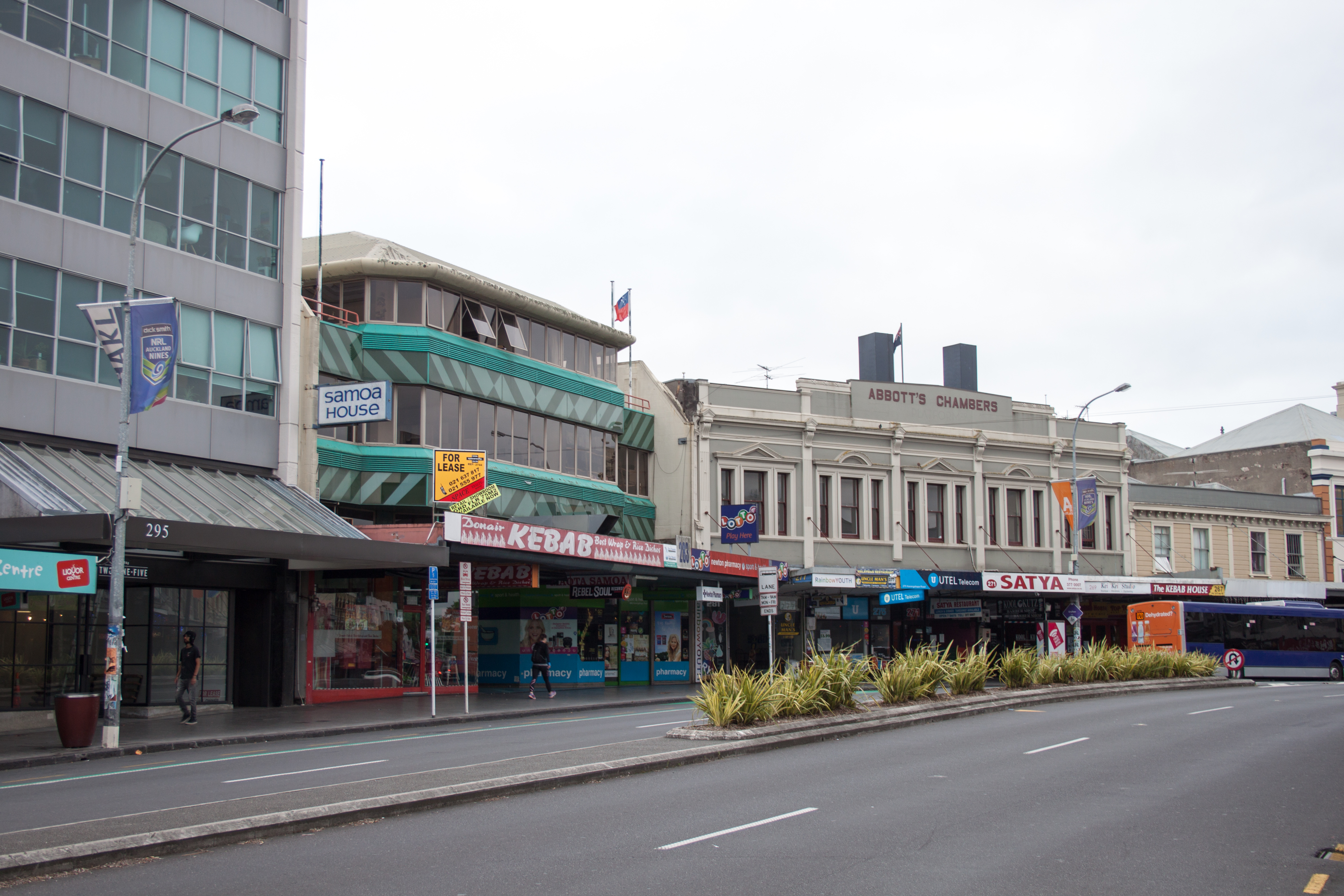
Karangahape Road elevation of Samoa House (centre left)

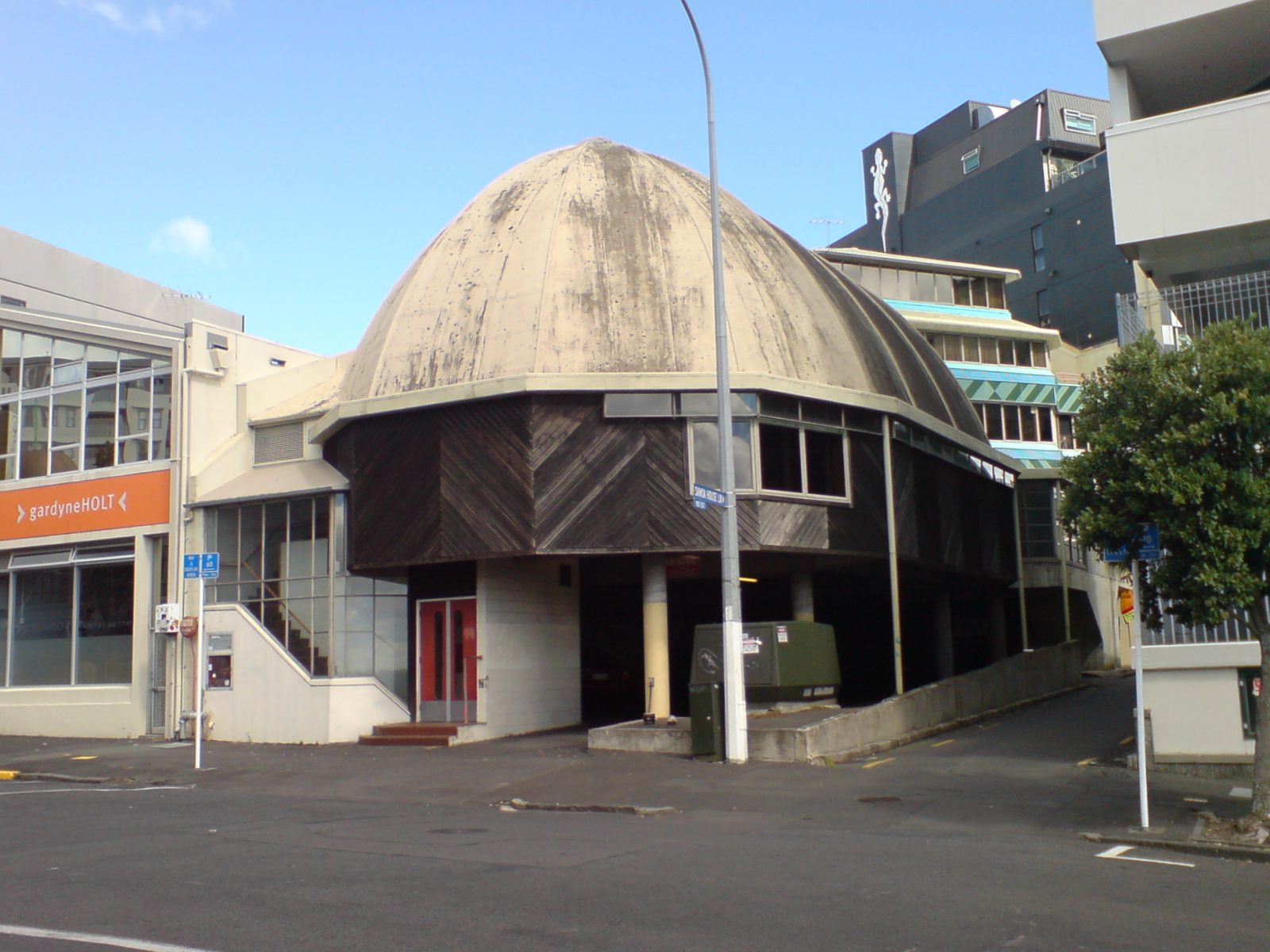
Beresford Square frontage of Samoa House

== Honours and awards ==
In the 1997 Queen's Birthday Honours, Mercep was appointed an Officer of the New Zealand Order of Merit, for services to architecture. He was awarded the gold medal of the New Zealand Institute of Architects in 2008.
