= Richard Chandler (businessman) =

New Zealand businessman

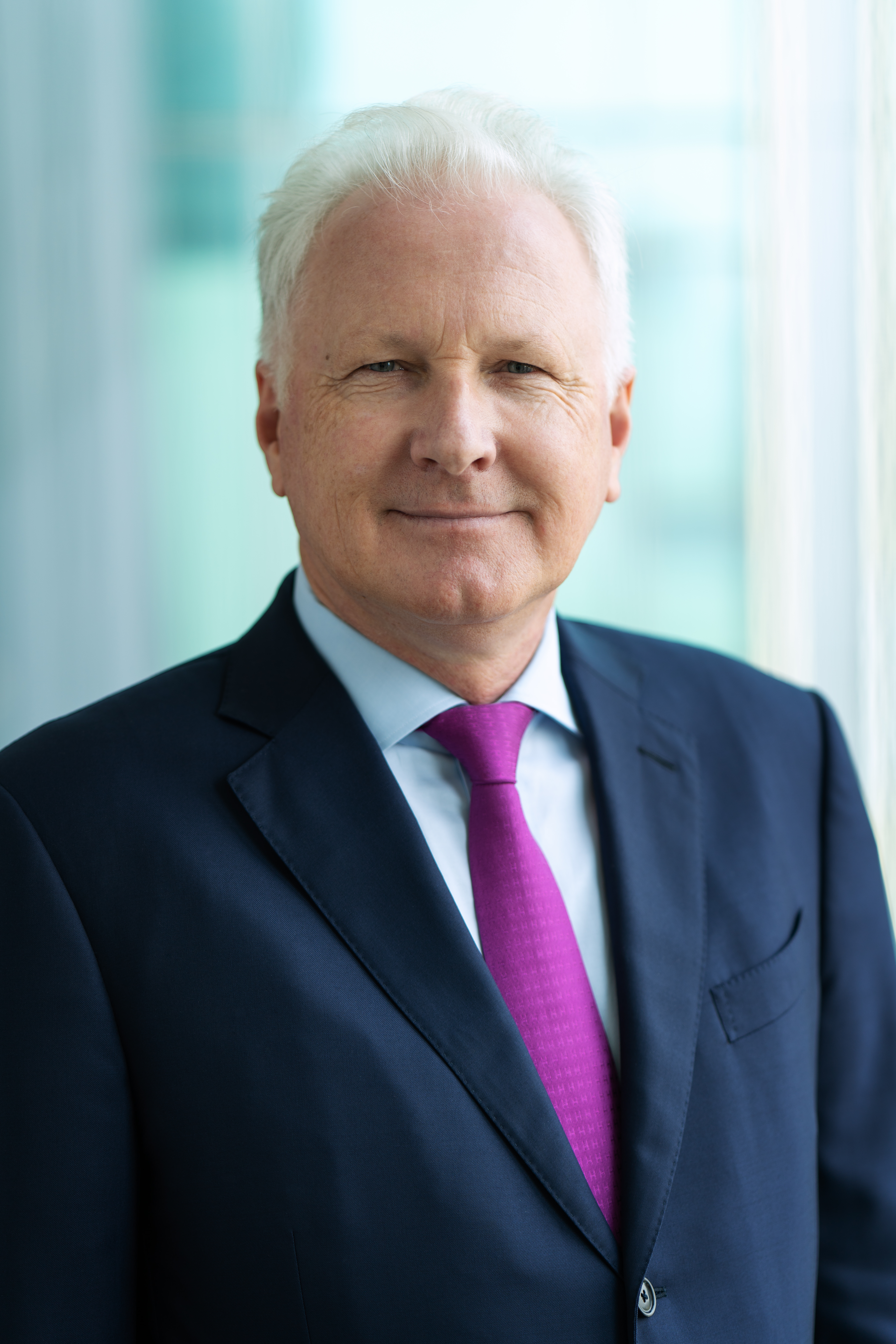
- Chandler in 2018
- Born: Richard Chandler; 1958 or 1959 (age 67–68); Matangi, New Zealand
- Education: University of Auckland
- Occupation: Investor
- Title: Chairman, Clermont Group
- Spouse: Kady Leyau

Richard Fred Chandler (born 1958 or 1959) is a New Zealand-born billionaire businessman. Starting his career as an investor in 1982, in 2006 he founded the Clermont Group, an international conglomerate based in Singapore. Chandler "has a reputation for buying struggling companies and successfully rebuilding them," according to ABC News. He remains chairman of the Clermont Group.

== Early life ==
Born in Matangi, New Zealand, Richard Fred Chandler is one of three sons of businesswoman Marija Chandler and her husband Robert Chandler, a beekeeper. Marija and Robert co-founded the luxury department store Chandler House in 1972 in Hamilton, New Zealand. Raised in Waikato, Richard Chandler attended Auckland Grammar School in Auckland with his brother Christopher.

Chandler obtained a bachelor of commerce from the University of Auckland in 1979. He wrote his master's thesis at the same institution in 1982, researching board structure and accountability in New Zealand.

== Career ==
=== Early years (1980s-2006) ===
Chandler began his career at Arthur Andersen in Auckland, New Zealand. He started working at KPMG in London in 1982. Later that year he returned to New Zealand to become the CEO of Chandler House, the family business. After selling the company he moved to Monaco, where in 1986, Richard and his brother Christopher founded Sovereign Asset Management, their own investment firm. With US$10 million in starting capital and Richard as CEO, by in the late 1980s the company focused on Hong Kong real estate.

With Sovereign Asset Management renamed Sovereign Global, in the 1990s the Chandler brothers began investing in companies in Latin America. Between 1986 and 2006, Sovereign also invested in companies and governments in Asia, Africa, and Eastern Europe, and in industries including telecommunications, electric utilities, steel, oil and gas, banking and oil refining. In 2003, Sovereign invested $168 million in purchasing a 15% stake in SK Group, a large South Korean conglomerate. In the several years afterwards, the Chandler brothers were involved in a highly publicized conflict with the SK Corp. board. They ultimately sold their stake in 2005 after the board rebuffed their efforts to replace SK chairman and CEO Chey Tae-won, who had been convicted of accounting fraud for illegal stock trades. The Chandler brothers profited US$728 million from the investment before selling.

The Chandler brothers were the wealthiest business people in New Zealand by late 2006. That year, Richard's investment style at Sovereign was described as deep value investing, primarily in global emerging markets and especially in distress situations. In 2006 he told Institutional Investor that "we do have altruistic motives that some investors who are looking for a path of least resistance find hard to understand, but we don’t want to be defined by our corporate governance battles. We are value investors with a sense of responsibility, not activists."

=== Orient Global and Chandler Corp (2006-2015) ===
Richard and Christopher Chandler split their assets at Sovereign in December 2006, with Richard creating Orient Global and Christopher starting Legatum Capital. Richard relocated to Singapore in 2006. Originally based in Singapore, Dubai, and London, Orient Global changed its name to Richard Chandler Corporation in April 2010. The company founded Newtown International, an educational service, in Bangladesh in 2011. According to the Santangels Review, Chandler's business ventures by 2011 had been tinged with themes of contrarian investment, corporate governance and social responsibility, especially by investing in and managing companies with national socio-economic implications. It was reported in 2012 that Chandler had considered investing in the Tasmanian logging company Gunns, but decided not to.

The Richard Chandler Corporation was renamed the Chandler Corporation in 2013. The Chandler Corporation by 2013, among other companies, owned and operated healthcare companies in Indonesia and the Philippines. In June 2013 the Chandler Corporation acquired an 80% stake in Hoan My Medical Corporation, the largest private hospital group in Vietnam, for US$99 million. In 2015, it became Hoan My's sole owner. In the Forbes Rich List of 2014, Chandler was only one of two billionaires with New Zealand nationality, with a net worth of US$3.8 billion. In 2015, he also owned a 19% stake in InterOil.

=== Clermont Group (2016-present) ===
The Chandler Corporation was renamed the Clermont Group in 2016. In 2017, Chandler fully acquired the company magniX, a startup developing an electric propulsion system for aircraft. Chandler had been investing in high-powered electric motor development for some time, specifically work by his uncle Tony Guina, the founder of Guina Energy, which was later renamed magniX. magniX began operating as a subsidiary of the Clermont Group. By 2018, the Clermont Group fund Corinthia had invested in the London-based bank OakNorth.

Chandler's company created its aerospace unit, Clermont Aerospace, in 2019. Through the Clermont Group, Chandler agreed to pay $US76 million for a 70% stake in Eviation, an Israeli startup developing electric aircraft, in 2019. magniX secured a US$74 million, five-year contract from NASA in 2021 to research the propulsion of electrified aircraft. In 2023 Chandler was ranked as the 14th richest person in Singapore by Forbes, with an estimated wealth of $2.9 billion.

== Philanthropy ==
Chandler co-founded Geneva Global, which described itself as a "philanthropic investment bank,” in 1999. In 2007, he formed a US$100 million education initiative focused on building low-cost private education projects in India. He was invited to be a core partner in Co-Impact, a philanthropic organization, in 2017. Other core partners at the time included Bill and Melinda Gates, Jeffrey Skoll, Kathy Wadhwani, and the Rockefeller Foundation. Chandler is also the founder of the Chandler Foundation and the Chandler Institute of Government.

== Personal life ==
He is married to Kady Leyau, a businesswoman, former model, actress, and Taiwan MTV VJ.
