= Samoa House =

Building in Auckland, New Zealand

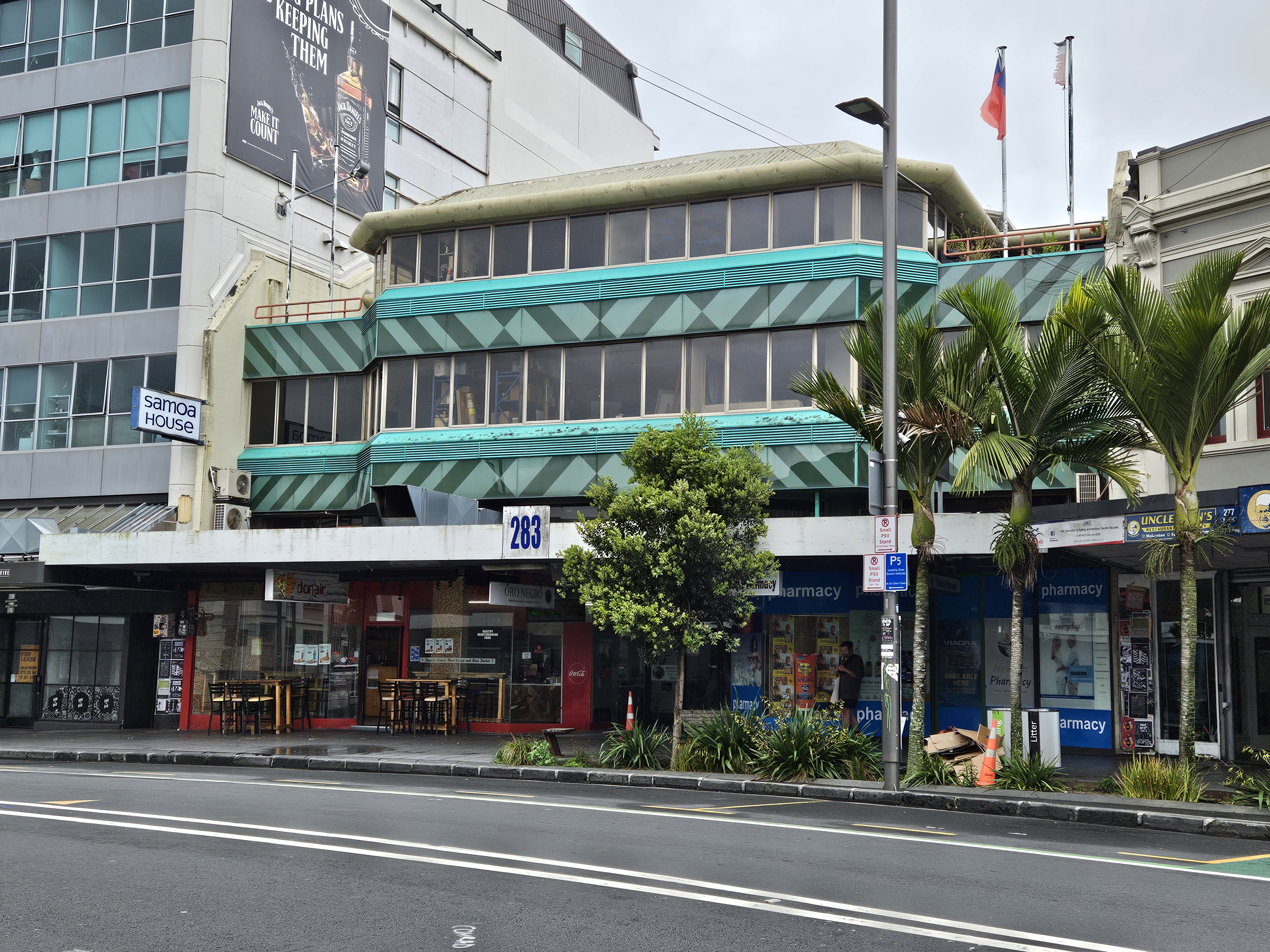
- Main entrance of Samoa House on Karangahape Road
- Interactive map of the Samoa House area
- Alternative names: Maota Samoa

General information
- Location: 283 Karangahape Road, Newton, Auckland, New Zealand
- Coordinates: 36°51′25″S 174°45′29″E
- Completed: 1978

Design and construction
- Architecture firm: JASMaD (now JASMaX)

Other information
- Facilities: Independent art library, community space

Website
- www.samoahouselibrary.org

Samoa House, also known as Maota Samoa, is a building at 283 Karangahape Road in Auckland, New Zealand. The first fale (Samoan house) outside of Samoa, it was built using funds raised by the Samoa House Appeal Fund, and opened on 15 December 1978. The Samoa House Appeal Fund was primarily made up of local Pacific community members. Previously the home of the Samoan Consulate in Auckland, the building currently houses Samoa House Library, an independent art library and community space established following the closure of Elam's Fine Arts Library in 2018. Samoa House Library is organised by the Save Fine Arts Library Charitable Trust, and is funded by both Creative New Zealand grants and other fundraisers.

== Background and opening ==
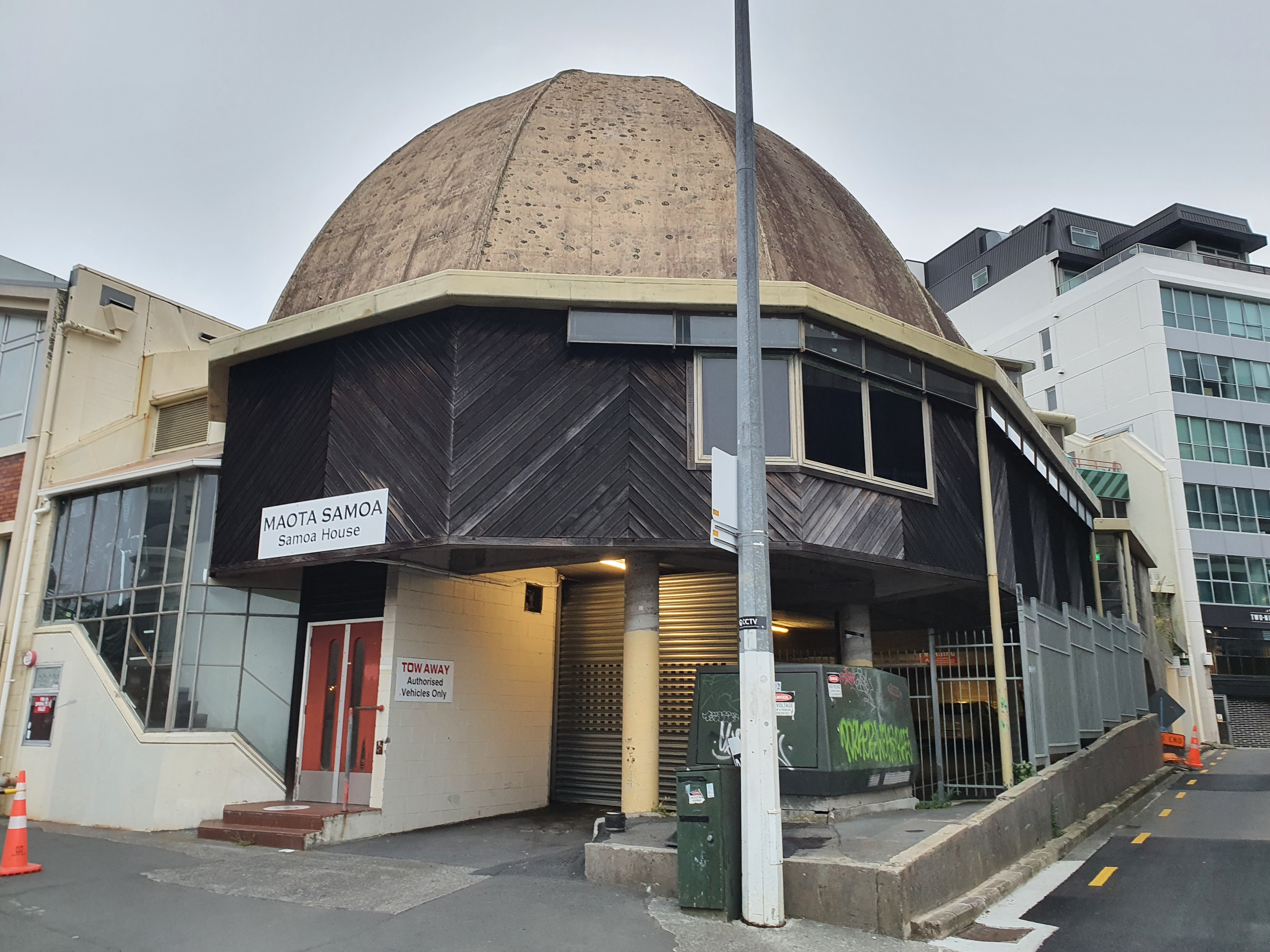
Fale of Samoa House

Samoa House was opened in 1978, amidst racial discord and strain in Auckland and across New Zealand, sparked by the Dawn Raids. The ceremony's ribbon was cut by the Prime Minister of the time, Robert Muldoon, from the National Party. Muldoon's attendance stirred controversy, given his and his party's responsibility for the Dawn Raids. However, some from the community saw irony and humour in his presence at the opening of Samoa House, which served as a refuge for Auckland's Pacific populace.

Prior to the beginning of fundraising, community member Manitete Fonoti outlined the motivations for building Samoa House in a speech, saying; "The advantages of modern building of this nature is where our people could come to qualified counsellors for legal problems, language classes, employment, difficulties, and emotional matters which we would with trained help, remedy much better than outsiders".

== Early years ==
From the 1950s, Karangahape Road had a large Pacific community, and Samoa House has functioned as a versatile commercial and community space for this population. It housed the Samoan Consulate from 1978 until 2016, when the consulate moved to Māngere, and also had a café, health services and a variety of shops. As a community space, numerous events were held there, including musical and cultural performances, private functions, fundraisers, company events, and classes. Artists such as Fatu Feu’u, Iosua Toafa, and Momoe Malietoa Von Reiche have held exhibitions in the building.

== Recent history ==
Following the Samoan government's choice to move the Samoan Consulate to Māngere, Samoa House, which is owned by the Samoan government, has been leased out to a variety of non-Pacific organisations, and as a result, has seen a large decline in use by Pacific people. As of 2023, the fale is leased to a performing arts programme. The move of the consulate was a reflection of the mass movement of Pacific communities into the South Auckland area, due to the ongoing gentrification of the inner-city suburbs.

=== Samoa House Library ===
In March 2018, a proposal document was published, outlining the proposed closure of three of the University of Auckland's specialist libraries; Fine Arts, Music and Dance, and Architecture and Urban Planning. These closures were confirmed in August 2018, and in response, Samoa House Library opened on 22 September 2018, on the second floor of Samoa House. Samoa House Library is an alternative arts library and community space, and their collection is largely made up of donations, from both individuals and institutions. In 2019, Samoa House Library launched a Boosted crowdfunding campaign which raised $NZ 10,000 to secure their physical lease. Samoa House Library is supported by Friends of Maota Samoa, a community group aimed to promote and preserve the Samoa House building.

=== 45th Anniversary ===
Celebrations on 16 December 2023 marked the 45th anniversary of the opening of Samoa House. More than 200 people attended the celebration, which featured speeches, song and dance, and markets. Many prominent Pacific community members attended, including politician Jenny Salesa, former Deputy Prime Minister Carmel Sepuloni, and Reverend Mua Strickson-Pua.
