= Hafsat Abiola =

Nigerian human rights, civil rights and democracy activist

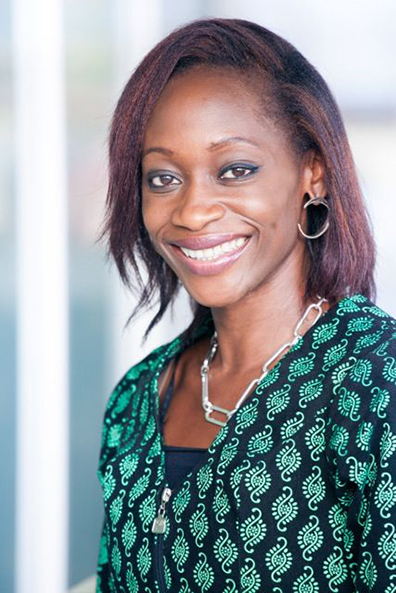
- Born: Hafsat Olaronke Abiola; 21 August 1974 (age 52); Lagos, Nigeria
- Education: Harvard University; Tsinghua University
- Occupation: Human Rights Activist
- Notable work: The President of Women in Africa Initiative (WIA)
- Spouse: Nicholas Costello (m. 2005)
- Children: 2
- Parents: Moshood Abiola (father); Kudirat Abiola (mother)
- Website: kind.org/whoweare/board

Hafsat Olaronke Abiola-Costello, (born on 21 August 1974) is a Nigerian human rights, civil rights and democracy activist. She is the founder of the Kudirat Initiative for Democracy (KIND), which seeks to strengthen civil society and promote democracy in Nigeria. She is the President of Women in Africa Initiative (WIA), an international platform for the economic development and support of African women entrepreneurs. She is also one of the founders of Connected Women Leaders (CWL).

== Early life and education ==
Born in Lagos, Abiola-Costello is the eighth child of Nigeria's uninaugurated president-elect, the late Chief Moshood Abiola and late Kudirat Abiola. Her father, Moshood Abiola, was put in prison by the dictator Gen. Sani Abacha for treason after declaring himself president. The elder Abiola later died while in detention in 1998. Her mother was murdered during a demonstration for the release of her husband in 1996. In June 2018, President Muhammadu Buhari bestowed the title of Grand Commander of the Federal Republic (GCFR) on her father, late Chief Moshood Abiola, the winner of the presidential election on 12 June 1993.

Abiola-Costello studied at Queens College, Yaba, Lagos and then Phillips Academy, Andover, Massachusetts where she graduated in 1992. She then studied Development Economics receiving a degree from Harvard College in 1996, and later earned her M.Sc. in International Development from Tsinghua University, Beijing.

== Career ==
=== Kudirat Initiative for Democracy (KIND) ===
In honor of her late mother, she founded KIND in 1997, with the aim of promoting the development of women as initiators of change through leadership and awareness programs. She is currently the board president.

KIND is among the major organizations that demanded for the reconsideration of the gender bill rejected by National Assembly of Nigeria (NASS). A bill seeking the amendment of the section 26 (2a) of the Nigerian 1999 constitution; if passed, foreigners married to Nigerian women will be able to apply for Nigerian citizenship. The bill is also pushing for at least 35% of political party and appointive positions at the federal and state levels be filled by women, as well as many other issues related to women's rights.

=== Later works ===
In 2009, Abiola-Costello founded China-Africa Bridge and China Africa Forum, which promotes mutually beneficial cross-cultural collaboration between China and Africa, with a specific eye on women's contributions to the economy.

In 2006, she raised funds by organising performances of The Vagina Monologues in Nigeria.

Since May 2008, she is also a Councillor at the World Future Council among 49 other well known personalities.

Abiola-Costello is an advisory council member at the Fetzer Institute, as well as the Nuclear Age Peace Foundation.

In July 2011, she was appointed the Special Adviser to the Governor of Ogun State with responsibility for achieving the Millennium Development Goals.

In 2016, she was re-appointed Special Adviser to Governor Ibikunle Amosun in Ogun State.

In 2022, she announced her support for the Kogi state government's intention to run for the position of president of the republic of Nigeria. In her words, she affirm that, she is leading the campaign efforts for Governor Yahaya Bello because she sees the qualities needed to take Nigeria to its right destination in him.

== Personal life ==
In 2001, she married British economist and diplomat Nicholas Costello. They have 2 children.

== Awards and recognition ==
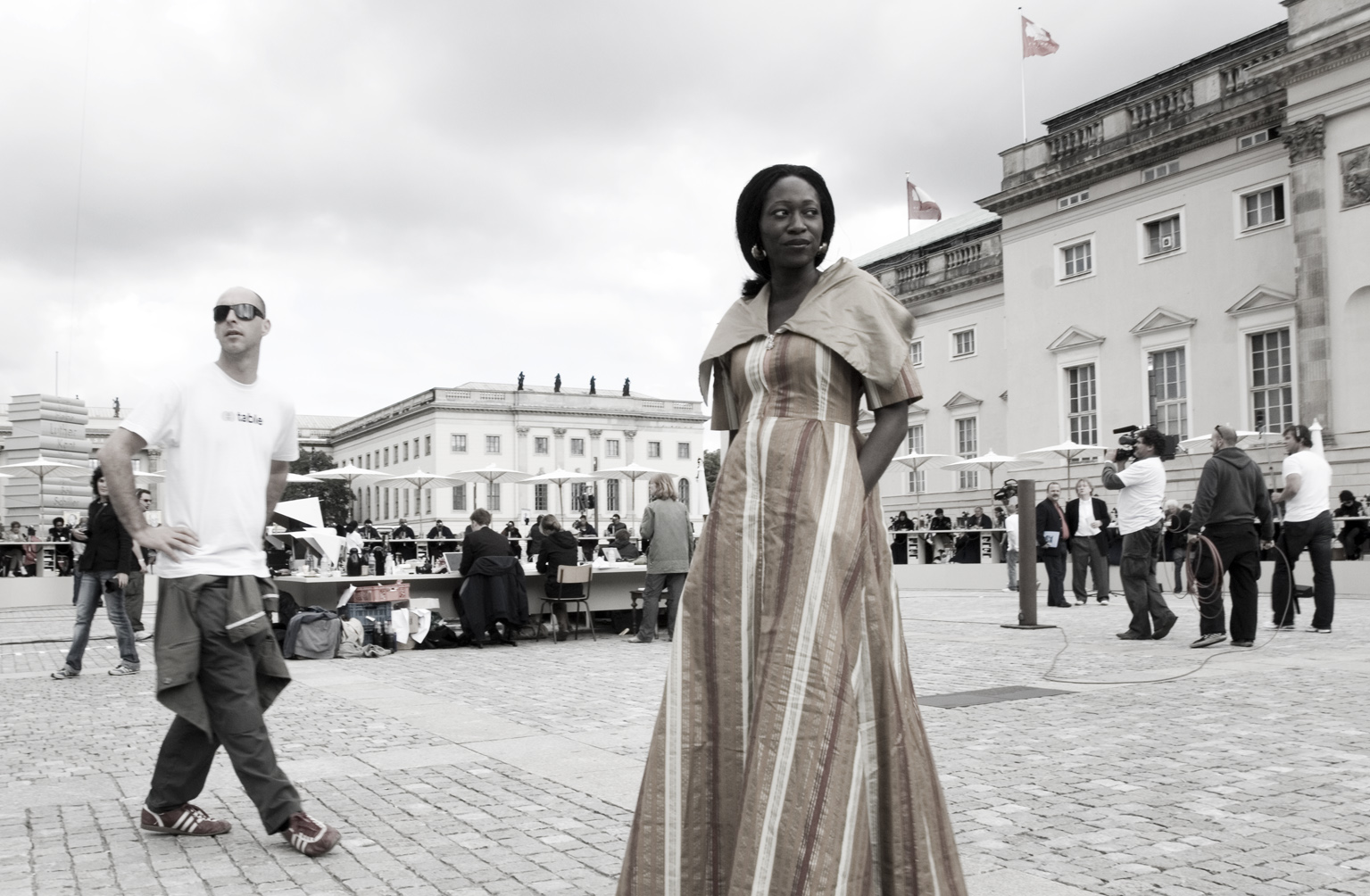
Hafsat Abiola and Ralf Schmerberg, Co-founder Dropping Knowledge project, Bebelplatz square, Berlin, September 2006)

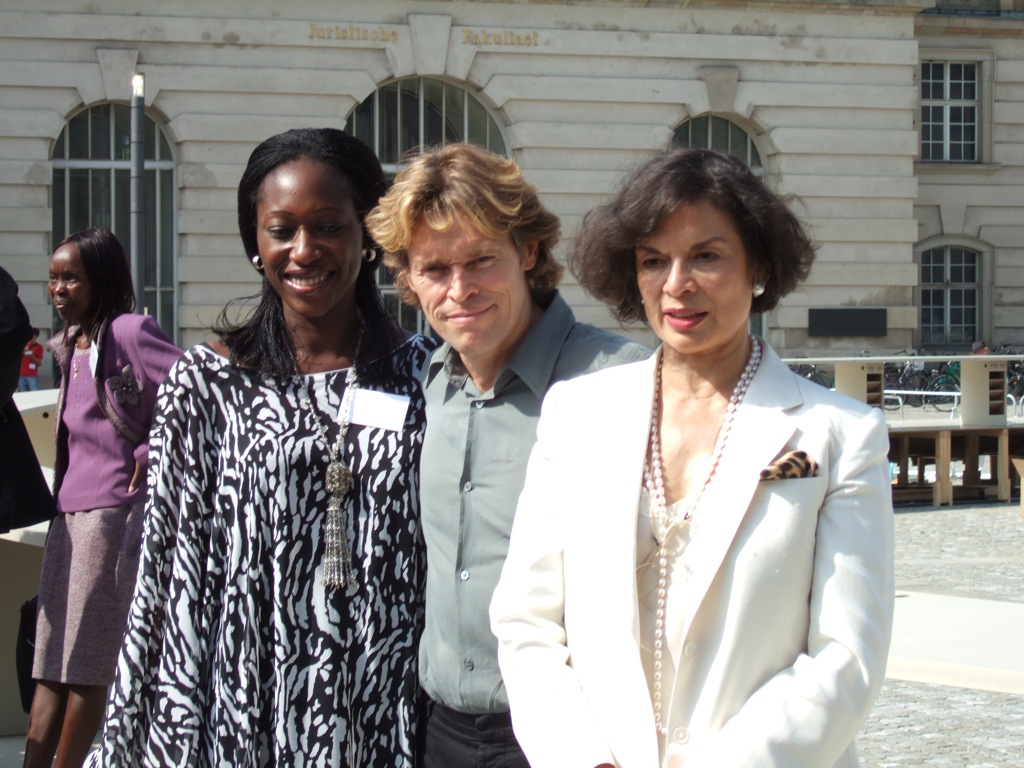
Hafsat Abiola, Willem Dafoe and Bianca Jagger at the Dropping Knowledge project's Table of Free Voices, September 2006

In 2000, Abiola was honored as a Global Leader of Tomorrow at the World Economic Forum in Davos, Switzerland. She was elected in 2003 as a Fellow of the Ashoka: Innovators for the Public in recognition of her international status as a social entrepreneur. In 2006, she was nominated to be a founding councillor at the World Future Council

A 2014 documentary, "The Supreme Price" details the story of Hafsat Abiola and how both her parents paid a terrible cost in their quest for a better, freer Nigeria. It was directed by Joanna Lipper, a lecturer at Harvard University, who tells the story from Hafsat's perspective. The documentary also includes interviews with Walter Carrington, former U.S. ambassador to Nigeria, and Nobel Prize-winning writer Wole Soyinka.

In 2015, she was chosen to be one of 21 women who met for a conference at Harvard University Kennedy School of Government funded by Hunt Alternatives. The group included Judy Thongori from Kenya, Fauzia Nasreen from Pakistan and Olufunke Baruwa, Esther Ibanga and Ayisha Osori also from Nigeria. Some of her other awards and recognitions include:

- Youth Peace and Justice Award of the Cambridge Peace Commission, 1997
- State of the World Forum Changemaker Award, 1998
- Woman to Watch for Award, 1999
- Global Leader of Tomorrow Award, World Economic Forum, 2000
- Nuclear Age Peace Foundation Global Award, 2001
- Seeking Common Ground Award, 2007
- Andover Alumni Award of Distinction, 2013
- Goi Peace Award, 2016
- Foreign Policy Diplomat of the Year Award, 2016
- National Civil Rights Museum’s Freedom Award, 2019

Hasfat Abiola was named one of the 19 Influential African Women in International Development in 2025, by the Leading Ladies Africa, alongside Caroline Kouassiaman, Jessica Horn, and Tsitsi Masiyiwa.

== See also ==
- Hasfat Abiola (oral history and transcript), Georgetown Institute for Women, Peace and Security
- Equipping entrepreneurs for survival and success in post-pandemic Africa (interview with Dr. Ngozi Okonjo-Iweala)
- Africa, China, and Women (essay) by Hafsat Abiola
- Nigeria's Orphan (profile), Time magazine (1998)
- The opportunity gap for women in Africa is #Solvable (courtesy of the Rockefeller Foundation)
