= Judy Thongori =

Kenyan lawyer and activist (died 2025)

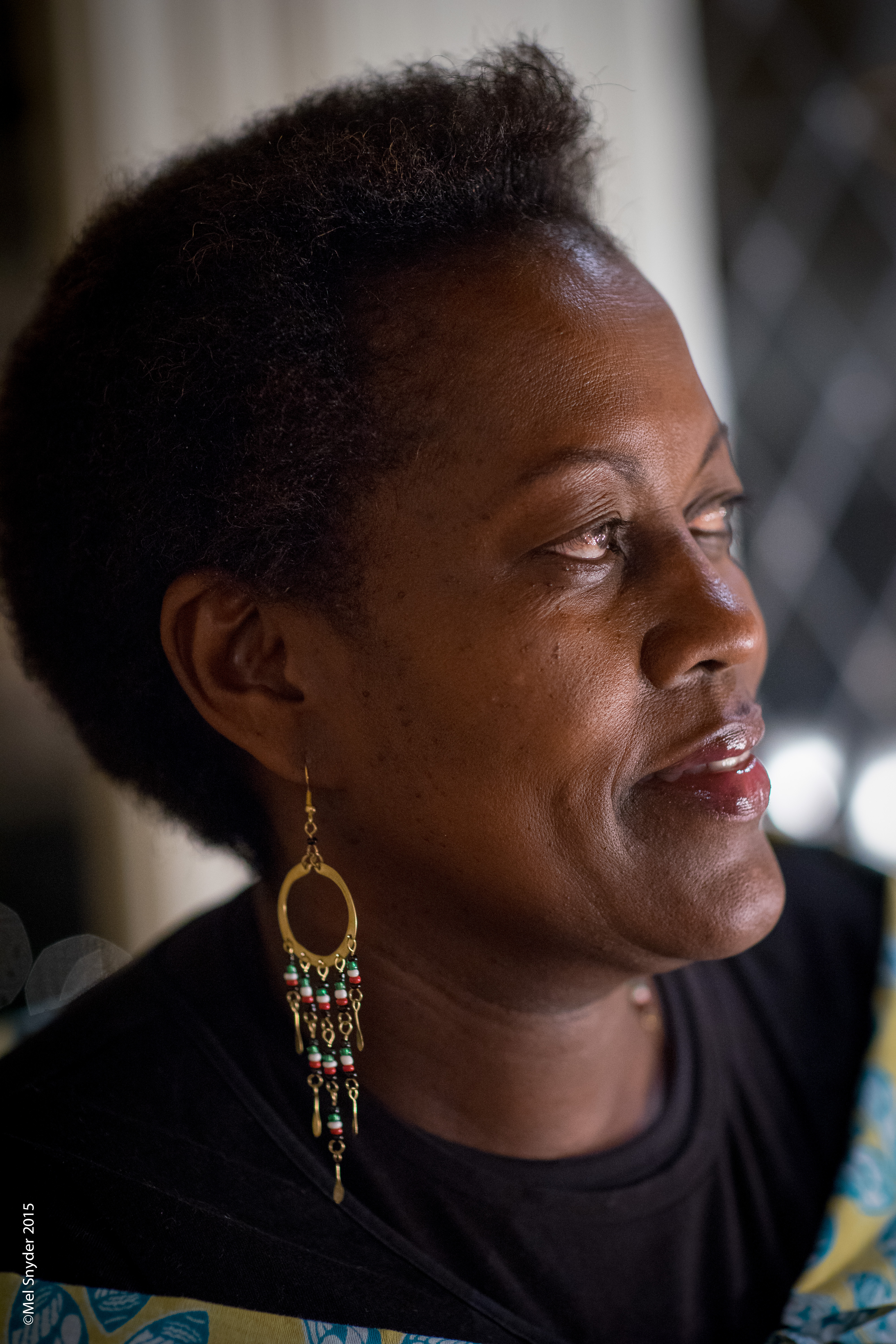
- Thongori in 2015
- Born: 1964/1965
- Died: 14 January 2025; India
- Education: University of Nairobi
- Spouse: John Thongori
- Children: 2

Judy Thongori (1964/1965 – 14 January 2025) was a Kenyan lawyer and rights activist. She was a women's rights activist, and she successfully sued the Kenyan government for not delivering 30% representation for women.

== Life and career ==
Thongori was born in 1964 or 1965. She was educated at Kahuhia Girls' High School for Ordinary Level (O-Level) and Advanced Level (A-Level). She graduated from the law school at the University of Nairobi and began an unchallenging job at the Attorney general's office. She left there to join Lee Muthoga and Associates where she felt purposed. She started to build up a private practice and a reputation as an advocate in company law.

Thongori was married to another lawyer, John Thongori, with whom she had two children.

She started her own law company, and she became an advocate for women's rights. She saw that the Kenyan police ignored abuse cases where the woman and family relied on the man's income. She realised that the culture was at fault. She organised training sessions for the police to inform their actions. Thongori spent five years leading an association of women lawyers. She was recognised by the Institute for Inclusive Security and Thongori's highest profile case was when she won a case against the Kenyan government when they failed to deliver 30% representation for women.

In 2015 she was chosen to be one of 21 women who met for a conference at Harvard University Kennedy School of Government funded by Hunt Alternatives. The group included Fauzia Nasreen from Pakistan and Olufunke Baruwa, Esther Ibanga, Hafsat Abiola and Ayisha Osori from Nigeria.

In 2023 she joined a committee to look at the activities of radical religious groups formed by President William Ruto. The committee of seventeen was formed following the discovery of over 170 bodies in the Shakahola Forest. It was said that followers of a church in the Dagoretti Constituency were encouraged to starve themselves to "meet Jesus". Critics said that Ruto had chosen "insiders" to investigate.

Thongori died following a short illness in India where she had gone for treatment, on 14 January 2025, aged 60.
