= Ayisha Osori =

Nigerian author and lawyer

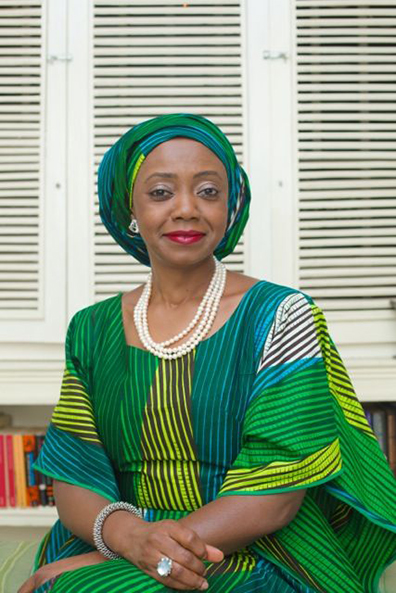
- Education: University of Lagos; Harvard Law School; Harvard Kennedy School of Government
- Occupations: Lawyer; Journalist
- Website: ayishaosori.com

Ayisha Osori is a Nigerian lawyer, author, international development consultant, journalist and politician known for her work on good governance, gender equality, women economic and political participation and ending violence against women in Nigeria. Her book Love Does Not Win Elections gives her insight into Nigerian politics. She is the former CEO of the Nigerian Women's Trust Fund. Olufunke Baruwa succeeded her.

== Education ==
Ayisha Osori studied law at the University of Lagos and Harvard Law School. She holds a Masters in Public Administration from the Harvard Kennedy School of Government. She was called to the Nigerian and New York State Bars in 1998 and 2000 respectively.

In 2013, as an Eisenhower Fellow, she was invited to America to spend seven weeks meeting important organisations and the chair of the Eisenhower Fellowship, Colin Powell.

== Career ==
Osori has worked on several projects in the public and private sector including corporate and regulatory practice, business management and administration, communications, civil society management, project management and issues-based advocacy. In addition to holding senior management roles in the private sectors and managing the Nigerian Women Trust Fund –a non-profit organization focused on increasing the quality and quantity of women in decision-making, for three years, Osori has consulted for the World Bank, United Nations Development Programme, Department for International Development, UNICEF and the National Democratic Institute.

In 2015, she was chosen as part of a delegation of 21 women who met for a conference at Harvard University Kennedy School of Government funded by Hunt Alternatives. The group included Fauzia Nasreen from Pakistan, Judy Thongori from Kenya and Olufunke Baruwa, Esther Ibanga and Hafsat Abiola also from Nigeria. A keen commentator on public issues ranging from governance to values and human rights and public policy, Osori maintained a weekly column for the most part of seven years in ThisDay and Leadership newspapers and is a regular media commentator on radio and television. She sits on the board of various organisations in the public and private sector.

In 2018, the Open Society Foundations announced the appointment of Osori as the executive director of the Open Society Initiative for West Africa (OSIWA) overseeing the operations of OSIWA in 10 African countries; Benin, Ivory Coast, Ghana, Guinea, Liberia, Mali, Niger, Nigeria, Sierra Leone, and Senegal.

== Love Does Not Win Elections ==
In 2014, Ayisha Osori contested the primaries for a seat in the National Assembly on the platform of Nigeria's ruling party, the People's Democratic Party, but lost. :Love Does Not Win Elections" is a book about her experiences in the electoral process and Nigerian politics as a whole. In the book, she expressed her dissatisfaction with the quality of representation from the men and women in office, and after years of advising on and working to get more women into leadership positions, she is curious about what it would take to contest and win. The book also provides insight into the role that money plays in Nigerian elections.

== Too Good to Die ==
In 2018, Ayisha Osori co-authored a book titled "Too Good to Die": Third Term And The Myth Of The Indispensable Man In Africa, with the former chairman of the National Human Rights president Chidi Odinkalu. The book puts to scrutiny claims by ex-Nigerian president Olusegun Obasanjo, that he did not seek a third term in office.
