= Ifeoma =

Nigerian given name

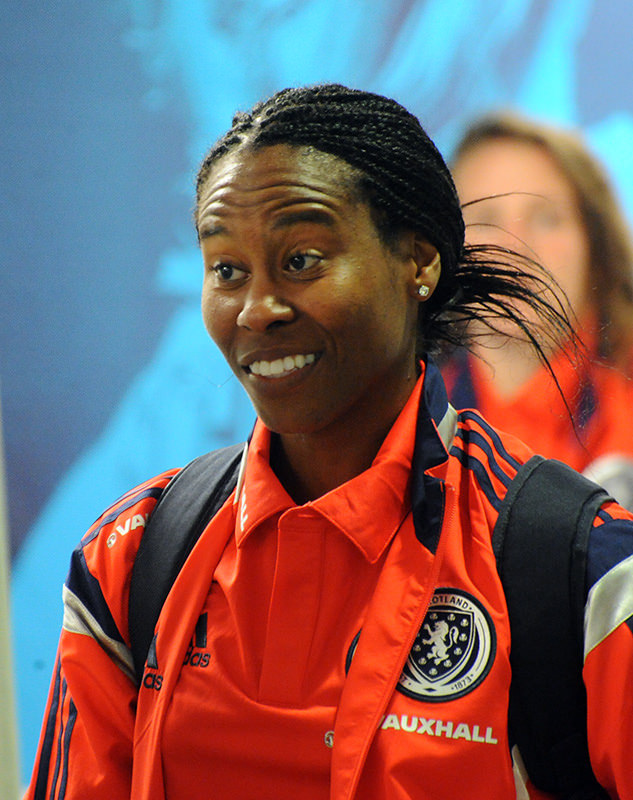
- Ifeoma Dieke in 2014
- Gender: Female
- Language: Igbo

Origin
- Origin: Igbo
- Meaning: Good thing
- Region of origin: Igboland

Other names
- Related names: Iheoma

Ifeoma // is a popular female name of Igbo origin. It means “good thing” (i.e., the child) and is a dialectal variant of Iheoma.

== Notable people with this name ==
- Ifeoma Aggrey-Fynn (1980–2015), Ghanaian-Nigerian media personality, writer and public speaker
- Ifeoma Ajunwa (born 1980), Nigerian-American writer and professor of labor relations, law, and history
- Ifeoma Dieke (born 1981), American-born Scottish football defender
- Ifeoma Iheanacho (born 1988), Nigerian wrestler
- Ifeoma Kulmala (born 1988), Finnish football referee
- Ifeoma Malo, Nigerian lawyer
- Ifeoma Mbanugo (born 1952), Nigerian long-distance runner
- Ifeoma Nwoye (born 1993), Nigerian wrestler
- Ifeoma Okoye, Nigerian author
- Ifeoma Onumonu, Nigerian professional footballer
- Ifeoma Onyefulu (born 1959), Nigerian children's author
- Ifeoma Ozoeze (born 1971), Italian heptathlete
- Ifeoma Ozoma, American policy expert and equity advocate
- Ifeoma Uddoh, Nigerian social entrepreneur

== Others ==
- "Ifeoma", a 1989 song by Felix Lebarty
