= Iheoma =

- Gender: Female
- Language: Igbo

Origin
- Origin: Nigeria
- Meaning: Something wonderful/good thing
- Region of origin: Igboland

Other names
- See also: Ifeoma

Iheoma // (Ihe-ọma) is a feminine name from the Igbo people of Nigeria. The name means "something wonderful" or "good thing. It is also commonly spelled as Ifeoma.

== Notable people with the name ==
- Iheoma Nnadi, Nigerian beauty queen
- Iheoma Obibi, Nigerian entrepreneur
