= Nigerian Women's Trust Fund =

The Nigerian Women's Trust Fund is a women's political action committee dedicated to increasing women's representation and addressing gender equality in line with the National Gender Policy (NGP) of 2006. The Nigerian Women's Trust Fund conducts mentorship programs, provides access to funding, and publishes policy data. Founded in 2011, the Nigerian Women's Trust Fund is a non-governmental organization that was established in response to a vacancy of gender-focused political action committees supporting women in politics. The organization's strategy is oriented around promoting advocacy, developing research, fundraising, and grant creation, and developing competitive candidates that sustain the organization's values. The Nigerian Women's Trust Fund has partnered with various organizations to promote social equality across the region and have access to grant worth of One Hundred and fifty Thousand Dallas ($150,00) in 2023.

== Mission ==
The Nigerian Women's Trust Fund is a non-governmental organization seeking to bolster women's political participation in the Nigerian parliament. The mission of the Nigerian Women's Trust Fund is to increase women's descriptive representation and substantive representation within Nigerian governance. The Nigerian Women's Trust Fund aims to increase descriptive representation through preparing women to ascend up the political recruitment model from aspirant to legislator. Moreover, the organization seeks to increase substantive representation by publishing research, implementing projects, and promoting advocacy to influence change within the policy-making process.

The Nigerian Women's Trust Fund seeks to increase women's representation through providing women candidates with resources for leadership and governance to prepare them for succeeding as an elected official in office. The organization encourages activism and leadership through the implementation of mentorship programs to connect women with other women in politics, fostering network opportunities women in politics. The Nigerian Women's Trust Fund also engages in research, utilizing data to guide advocacy. As a result, the organization represents a local driving force of data publication and research on women's political participation and representation within the Nigerian government. Through their work, the Nigerian Women's Trust Fund seeks to implement institutional change towards creating a sustainable and inclusive system of governance.

== History ==
The Nigerian Women's Trust Fund was founded in 2011 in response to the 2011 Nigerian elections. The organization was created to address the lack of political action committees established to combat gender inequality within Nigerian parliament. The organization serves to provide further financial and technical resources to women candidates, framing the organization's mission as a gender-focused political action committee. The organization originated from a startup grant provided by the Office of the Senior Special Advisor to the President. The organization was led by Ayisha Osori and she was succeeded by Olufunke Baruwa. The organization is currently led by Mufuliat Fijabi as chief executive officer and Ere Amachree as the program director.

== Context ==
=== Political landscape ===
The Nigerian Women's Trust Fund operates within a political landscape that is exclusive towards women due to systemic disadvantages exacerbated by confining gender roles. Currently the representation of women in Nigerian elective and appointive positions is less than 5%, though the Nigerian Women's Trust Fund aims to increase that number to 35% by the 2027 elections. Women are discriminated against as political candidates as a result of traditional gender roles that portray women as mothers, subjecting them to domestic labor and caring for the family. These roles portray women as unfit for political office, excluding them from the political landscape. Many of these stereotypes are held by political party members and voters alike, contributing to intensive voter bias and discrimination within political parties. These rudimentary conceptions manifest violence against women in politics, creating an unsafe environment for women to safely participate in electoral elections. The electoral process harbors electoral malpractice, vote buying, and violence during the elections, often targeted at women. Women are systemically disadvantaged given the general lack of access to education and inadequate representation of women in political positions, hindering women from acquiring sufficient resources to pursue candidacy or foster nascent political ambition. Such political exclusion limits the role model effect, a natural process of recruiting women into politics. Moreover, women often lack sufficient funds to run an efficient campaign, presenting a major barrier to entry.

=== Political participation ===
The Nigerian Women's Trust Fund aims to provide support and resources aimed to address the gender inequality surrounding access to crucial resources that enable women's political engagement. The lack of funding accessible to Nigerian women candidates has an adverse effect on women's participation, disadvantaging women from running efficient and successful campaigns for office; the organization seeks to amend this by providing financial support for their endorsed candidates. The Nigerian Women's Trust Fund recognizes the structural barriers women are subject to and seeks to combat structural inequalities through program preparation. The organization acknowledges that women are fundamentally disadvantaged to participate in politics given the shortage of excess time to spend on a campaign, as women are expected to fulfill career obligations while attending to domestic duties, presenting an inegalitarian time share. Women in Nigerian politics are predisposed to violence against women in politics, making women candidates and legislators vulnerable to economic, semiotic, psychological, and physical violence. Women in Nigerian politics are subject to harassment as a result of communal patriarchal values that disrespect women, promoting an exclusive culture of misogyny. Many women candidates fail to receive support from their family, discouraging many women from participating in politics; the Nigerian Women's Trust Fund seeks to combat this through promoting support networks and career advancement mentorship programs.

== Strategy ==
The Nigerian Women's Trust Fund operates through various focus areas to best implement their mission. The organization seeks to create a gender inclusive political agenda by promoting knowledge and gender consciousness. The organization aims to address structural inequalities through influencing state poverty, violence, and patriarchy. Through the implementation of strategy, resources, and communication, the organization seeks to shed light on women's experience and create a policy window.

The Nigerian Women's Trust Fund's strategy is posed to best operationalize their mission. The strategy consists of an emphasis on advocacy to lobby the political class and electorate through careful selection of competitive women candidates to best push for policy change for greater social equality, focusing on areas such as education, healthcare, voting rights, and economic and gender equality. The organization produces research on democracy, leadership, and governance and creates databases of profiled female aspirants, aiming to increase demand for female candidates. The Nigerian Women's Trust Fund acts as a fundraising and grant making association, supporting the campaigns of women across party lines. The organization also holds programs to create resilient candidates prepared to campaign in a competitive political environment and bolster women's interest in elective positions.

== Impact ==
The Nigerian Women's Trust fund has made significant strides within the Nigerian political landscape. In 2022, The Nigerian Women's Trust Fund graduated 100 women from their training institute, the National Institute for Leadership and Ending Violence against Women and Girls. The training consisted of a 6 month mentorship program and was held in 8 states, including Adamawa, Cross River, FCT, Nasarawa, Ebonyi, Rivers, Nasarawa, Kebbi, and Ekiti. The organization has collaborated with the Independent National Electoral Commission to establish stakeholders to promote equality in the electoral space. The Nigerian Women's Trust fund has collaborated with the Child is Gold foundation to denounce human rights violations in Bauchi state. Overall, the Nigerian Women's Trust Fund serves as a beacon for women's representation in Nigerian governance globally.
