= Higherlife Foundation =

Non-profit

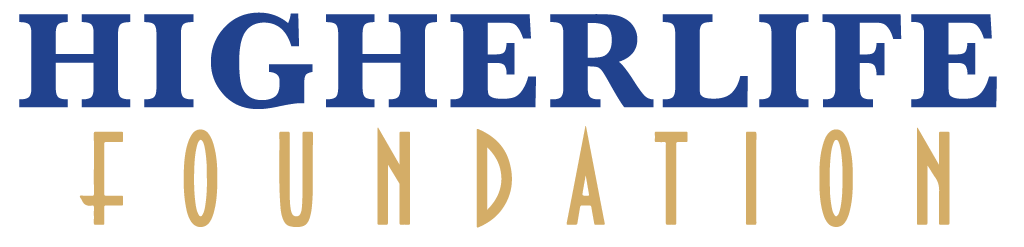
- Higherlife Foundation Logo
- Formation: 1996; 30 years ago.
- Founders: Strive Masiyiwa; Tsitsi Masiyiwa
- Type: Nonprofit organization
- Purpose: Education
- Headquarters: Harare, Zimbabwe
- Region served: Worldwide
- Method: Donations and Grants
- Website: http://www.higherlifefoundation.com
- Formerly called: Capernaum Trust (1996–2015)

Higherlife Foundation is an African philanthropic organization founded in 1996 by Strive and Tsitsi Masiyiwa. It was originally established in Zimbabwe during the HIV/AIDS crisis to support vulnerable children and has since expanded its work across several African countries.

== What Higherlife Foundation does ==
Its current work focuses on four major areas:

- Education – scholarships, mentorship, leadership development and digital learning. The foundation says it has supported more than 400,000 learners and offers scholarships ranging from early childhood education through PhD level.
- Health – maternal healthcare, disease prevention, healthcare-system strengthening and training of healthcare professionals.
- Sustainable livelihoods – supporting communities and smallholder farmers through livelihood programmes and climate-smart agriculture.
- Disaster relief and preparedness – emergency response, preparedness training and community resilience programmes.

== Scholarships ==
Some of its notable scholarship programmes include:

- Capernaum Scholarship – designed primarily for orphaned and vulnerable children.
- Joshua Nkomo Scholarship – supports academically gifted young Zimbabweans with leadership potential.
- Moshoeshoe Scholarship – supports high-performing students in Lesotho, particularly in areas such as science, engineering and technology.

== Countries ==
The foundation currently lists operations or programmes across Zimbabwe, Lesotho, Burundi, Kenya and South Africa, and its website also lists Nigeria among its African locations.
