= Caroline Kouassiaman =

Ivorian-American queer feminist and funder

- Other name: B. Caroline Kouassiaman
- Education: Occidental College (BA); Syracuse University (MPA, MAIR)
- Occupations: Feminist activist; Grantmaker; Executive director

Caroline Kouassiaman (also known as B. Caroline Kouassiaman) is a feminist activist and grantmaker of Ivorian and African-American heritage. She directs the Initiative Sankofa d'Afrique de l'Ouest (ISDAO), an organisation that funds feminist, LGBTQI, and social justice movements in francophone and anglophone West Africa.

== Education ==
Kouassiaman holds a B.A. in Economics and Diplomacy and World Affairs from Occidental College, and master's degrees in Public Administration and International Relations from Syracuse University.

== Career ==
Kouassiaman served as Programme Officer for Sub-Saharan Africa at the Global Fund for Women, coordinating grantmaking to women's rights organisations across the region. She worked at the American Jewish World Service (AJWS) as Senior Programme Officer for Sexual Health and Rights Kouassiaman currently serves as Initiative Sankofa d'Afrique de l'Ouest's (ISDAO) executive director. In 2025, Leading Ladies Africa listed Kouassiaman as one of "19 Influential African Women in International Development", alongside Jessica Horn, Hafsat Abiola, and Tsitsi Masiyiwa.

== Publications ==
- Kouassiaman, B. Caroline (2022). "Aujourd'hui, c'est aujourd'hui: Navigating power and speaking up as a West African activist-led fund". In Speaking Back, Speaking Black.
- Okanlawon, Kehinde; Oguaghamba, Akudo; Kouassiaman, Caroline; and Armisen, Mariam (2012). Struggling Alone: The Lived Realities of Women who have Sex with Women in Burkina Faso, Ghana and Nigeria. Queer African Youth Networking Center (QAYN).

== See also ==
- Jessica Horn
- Hafsat Abiola
- Tsitsi Masiyiwa
- Olumide Makanjuola
