= Jessica Horn =

Ugandan writer and activist

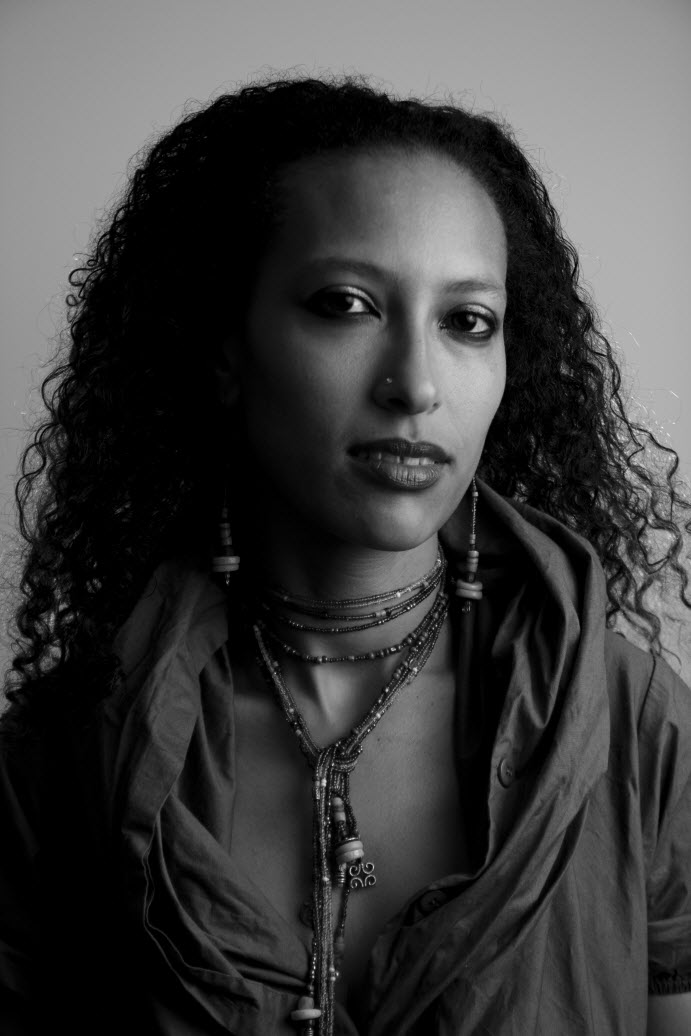
- Born: Jessica Horn; 1979 (age 46–47); England
- Education: Armand Hammer United World College of the American West, Smith College, London School of Economics
- Occupations: Poet, feminist writer, women's rights activist
- Writing career
- Genres: Poetry, social and political commentary
- Website: www.stillsherises.com

Jessica Horn (born 1979) is a feminist activist, writer, poet, and an advisor on women's rights with Ugandan and Malian background. Her work focuses on women's rights, bodily autonomy and freedom from violence, and African feminist movement building. She is also a leader in philanthropy. Jessica Horn was named as an African woman changemaker by ARISE Magazine and as one of Applause Africa's "40 African Changemakers under 40". She joined the African Women's Development Fund as director of programmes in October 2015. In 2021 she was appointed Regional Director of the Ford Foundation's East Africa office based in Nairobi, the first African woman to hold this position since the office opened in 1963.

== Early life and education ==
Horn was born in England to a Ugandan mother and father from the United States, and grew up in Lesotho and Fiji. She completed her international baccalaureate at the Armand Hammer United World College of the American West. She earned a Bachelor of Arts degree (magna cum laude) in anthropology from Smith College in 2001 and a Master of Science (Distinction) degree in gender and development from the London School of Economics in 2002.

== Career ==
Horn began her formal career in women's rights at the organisation RAINBO where she worked as coordinator of Amanitare - the African Network on Sexual and Reproductive Rights. She went on to manage funding for women's rights and minority rights at the Sigrid Rausing Trust, one of the largest private human rights funders in Europe. She then went on to found Akiiki Consulting, where she worked with human rights funders, policy institutions, and activist organisations, including the Stephen Lewis Foundation, the International Rescue Committee, Action Aid, the Association for Women's Rights in Development, Ford Foundation East Africa, and the United Nations. This included extensive travel and work in conflict-affected countries in Africa. She served as the director of programmes at the African Women's Development Fund from 2015 - 2020, and was appointed Regional Director for the Ford Foundation's East Africa office in 2021, serving until 2025.

As an action researcher, Horn was awarded a Soros Reproductive Health and Rights Fellowship in 2003 and conducted research on feminist responses to female genital mutilation in Egypt. She wrote two monographs on the impact of Christian fundamentalism on women's rights in Africa for the Association for Women's Rights in Development (AWID) Challenging Religious Fundamentalisms initiative. She is the lead author of the Cutting Edge Pack on Gender and Social Movements produced by BRIDGE at the Institute for Development Studies, University of Sussex in 2013. Her analysis of the practice of African feminist movements from independence to the present is explored in her book African Feminist Praxis: Cartographies of Liberatory Worldmaking published by Sage Publishing in 2025.

Horn has served as an advisor to philanthropic and women's rights initiatives, including Mama Cash, Urgent Action Fund-Africa, Comic Relief, the Kings College Conflict, Security & Development Group Knowledge Building and Mentoring Programme, and the journal Development. She worked as commissioning editor of "Our Africa" on openDemocracy 5050 from 2011 to 2015. She is a founder member of the African Feminist Forum Working Group. She was appointed to the Lancet Commission on Gender and Global Health.

== Poetry ==
Horn won the IRN FannyAnn Eddy Poetry Award in 2009 for her poem "They have killed Sizakele" and the Sojourner Poetry Prize judged by June Jordan in 2001 for her poem "Dis U.N: For Rwanda". Her prose-poem "Dreamings" was profiled in the International Museum of Women's online exhibition Imagining Ourselves. She is also the author of a collection, Speaking in Tongues (Mouthmark, 2006), which is included in the collected Mouthmark Book of Poetry alongside work by Warsan Shire, Malika Booker, and Inua Ellams. Her work has been featured on the Pan-African poetry platform Badilisha Poetry Radio.

As an activist poet, Horn has used poetry as a medium to discuss human rights abuses and explore the concept of revolutionary love, including through poetry platform The Love Mic.

== Selected publications ==
=== Research and analysis ===
- Horn, Jessica. 2025. African feminist praxis: Cartographies of liberatory worldmaking. London: Sage
- Michau, Lori, Jessica Horn, Amy Bank, Mallika Dutt, and Cathy Zimmerman. 2014. "Prevention of violence against women and girls: lessons from practice", The Lancet.
- Horn, Jessica. 2013. Gender and Social Movements: Cutting Edge Pack, BRIDGE/ Institute for Development Studies, University of Sussex.
- Horn, Jessica. 2012. Not as simple as ABC: Christian fundamentalisms and HIV/AIDS responses in Africa. Toronto: Association for Women's Rights in Development.
- Horn, Jessica and Bisi Adeleye-Fayemi (eds). 2009. Voice, Power and Soul: Portraits of African Feminists. Ghana: AWDF. ISBN 9789988125127
- Horn, Jessica. 2009. "Through the looking glass: Process and power within feminist movements", in Development, Vol 52.2, Power, Movements, Change. London: Sage Publishers, Society for International Development.
- Horn, Jessica. 2006. "Re-righting the sexual body", in Feminist Africa. Cape Town: African Gender Institute.
- Horn, Jessica. 2005. "Not 'culture' but gender: reconceptualising female genital mutilation/cutting", in Where Human Rights Begin: Health, Sexuality and Women Ten Years After Vienna, Cairo, and Beijing. Chavkin, Wendy and Chesler, Ellen (eds). New Jersey: Rutgers University Press. ISBN 9780813536576

=== Poetry collections ===
- Speaking in Tongues. Flipped Eye Publishing Limited. 2006. ISBN 9781905233113.
- "Speaking in Tongues" in The Mouthmark Book of Poetry, Flipped Eye Publishing Limited, 2013. ISBN 9781905233151.

=== Poems ===
- "A night in Zanzibar", in Sylvia Tamale, ed. (2011). African sexualities: A reader. Fahamu/Pambazuka. ISBN 9780857490162.
- "Uganda haikus (sunrise to 9pm)"
- "Sista, why do you run?"
- "Ye ye o (between a dancer and a drummer)"
- "epidermal offerings" and "salt"

== Awards and recognitions ==
- Winner IRN FannyAnn Eddy Poetry Award 2009
- Winner Sojourner Poetry Prize 2001
- In 2025, she was named one of the 19 Influential African Women in International Development by Leading Ladies Africa, alongside Caroline Kouassiaman, Hafsat Abiola, and Tsitsi Masiyiwa.
