= Strive Masiyiwa =

Zimbabwean businessman (born 1961)

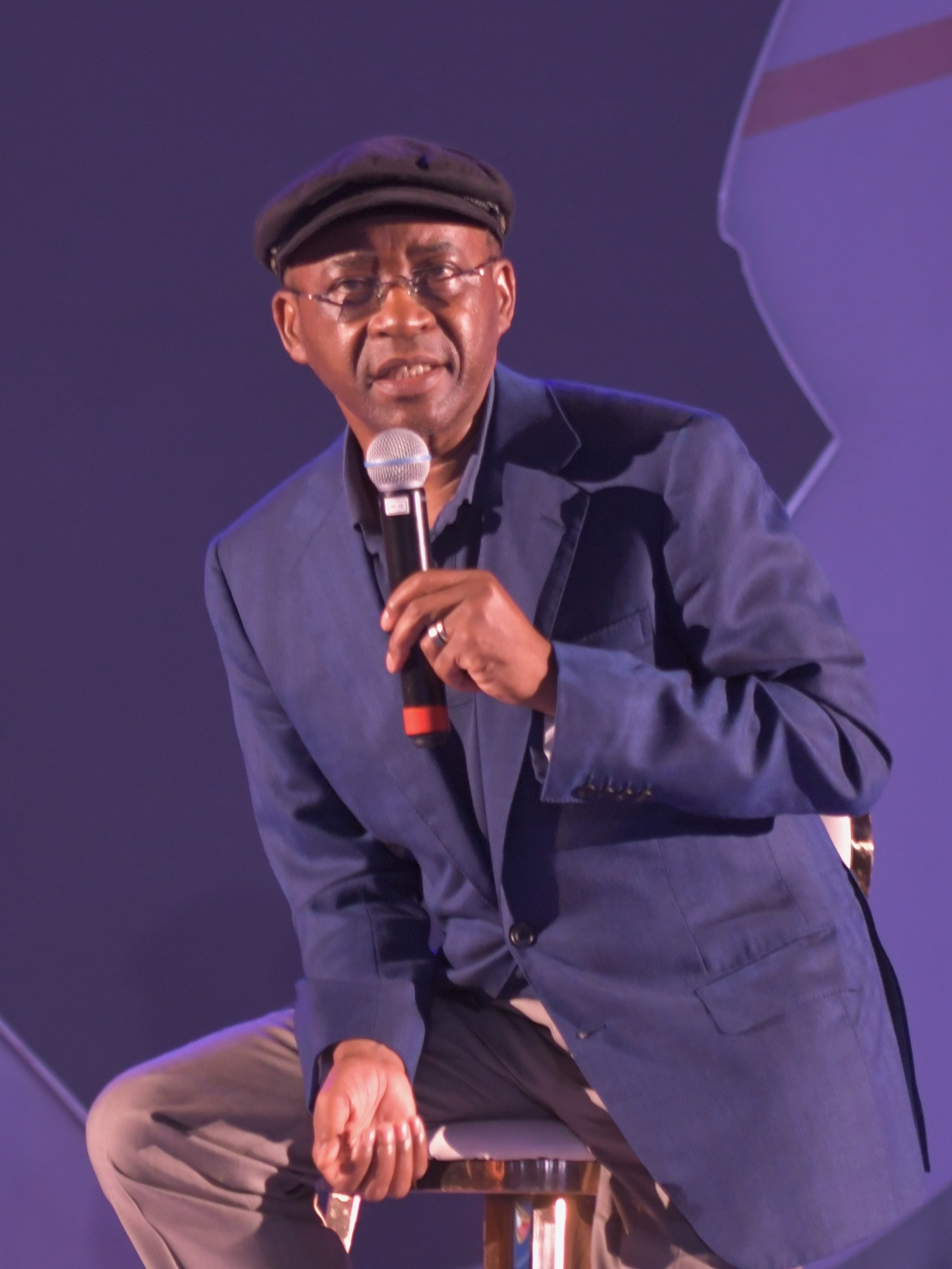
- Masiyiwa in 2019
- Born: 29 January 1961 (age 65); Zimbabwe
- Education: University of Wales
- Occupation: Businessman
- Title: Founder and executive chairman, Econet Global and Cassava Technologies
- Board member of: National Geographic Society; Gates Foundation; Ashinaga (organization) Netflix
- Spouse: Tsitsi Masiyiwa
- Children: 6

Strive T. Masiyiwa (born 29 January 1961) is a London-based Zimbabwean billionaire businessman and philanthropist. He is the founder and executive chairman of international technology groups Econet Global and Cassava Technologies. As of 2026, Forbes estimates his net worth at US$2.2 billion.

== Early life and education ==
Strive Masiyiwa was born in Southern Rhodesia, on 29 January 1961. When he was seven, his family left the country after Prime Minister Ian Smith's government declared a Unilateral Declaration of Independence from the United Kingdom. The family settled in Kitwe, a city in north central Zambia known for its copper mines. It was here that he attended primary school, before completing his secondary education in Scotland. Masiyiwa's mother was an entrepreneur. By the time Masiyiwa was 12 years old, his parents could afford to provide him with a European education.

They sent him to private school in Edinburgh, Scotland. When he graduated in 1978, he travelled back to Rhodesia, intending to join Robert Mugabe and Joshua Nkomo's anti-government guerrilla forces. However, he returned to education in Britain, and earned a degree in electrical engineering from the University of Wales in 1984. He worked briefly in the computer industry in Cambridge, England, but returned to Zimbabwe in 1984, hoping to aid the country's recovery following the end of the Rhodesian Bush War and universal franchise elections in 1980.

== Business career and interests ==
Masiyiwa returned to his native Zimbabwe in 1984 after a 17-year absence. After working briefly as a telecoms engineer for the state-owned telephone company, he quit his job and set up his own company after saving $75 from his salary. He built a large electrical engineering business. The emergence of mobile cellular telephony led him to diversify into telecoms, but he soon ran into major problems when the Zimbabwean government of Robert Mugabe refused to give him a license to operate his business, known as Econet Wireless.

Masiyiwa appealed to the Constitutional Court of Zimbabwe, on the basis that the refusal constituted a violation of "freedom of expression". The Zimbabwean court ruled in his favour after a five-year legal battle, which took him to the brink of bankruptcy. The ruling, which led to the removal of the state monopoly in telecommunications, is regarded as one of the key milestones in opening the African telecommunications sector to private capital. The company's first cellphone subscriber was connected to the new network in 1998.

Masiyiwa started Econet Wireless in 1993 and listed the company in Zimbabwe in July 1998 on the local stock exchange. Today, Econet Wireless Zimbabwe has gone on to become a major business that dominates the Zimbabwe economy. It is currently the second-largest company in Zimbabwe by market capitalisation.

In March 2000, fleeing persecution from the local authorities, Masiyiwa left Zimbabwe, never to return to the country, and moved first to South Africa, where he founded The Econet Wireless Group, a new and completely separate organisation to the listed Zimbabwean entity.

Some of the key businesses that he established with partners included Econet Wireless International, Econet Global, Mascom Wireless Botswana, Econet Wireless Nigeria (now Airtel Nigeria), Econet Satellite Services, Lesotho Telecom, Econet Wireless Burundi, Econet Wireless South Africa, Solarway, and Transaction Processing Systems (TPS). The company he created is known to have operations and investments across Africa plus the United Kingdom, Europe, US, Latin America, and New Zealand, and United Arab Emirates.

=== Econet Global ===
Econet Global (Econet) is a privately held international technology group with business operations and investments in Africa, Latin America, The United Kingdom, the USA, Europe, the Middle East, India, and United Arab Emirates (UAE).

Masiyiwa also has had interests in the United States of America (USA). He has partnered with one of America's leading telecoms entrepreneurs, John Stanton, in a venture called Trilogy International Partners, which built New Zealand's third mobile network operator known as "2 Degrees".

One of Masiyiwa's most successful ventures is the London-based privately held Liquid Telecom Group (now Liquid Intelligent Technologies) Africa's largest satellite and fibre optic business spanning the continent with more than 110,000 kilometres of cable from Cape Town to Cairo and also connecting through many countries from east to west Africa.

Other activities of Econet include digital enterprise networks, cybersecurity and cloud services, data centers, AI, fintech, digital platforms, and renewable energy.

=== Cassava Technologies ===
Masiyiwa is the founder of Cassava Technologies. Cassava operates over 100,000 km of fibre optic cables, which carry internet, through various countries in Africa.

In September 2025, it was announced that Masiyiwa is working on establishing AI factories in five countries with his company, Cassava Technologies. These countries would include, South Africa, Kenya, Egypt, Nigeria and Morocco. In November 2025, Cassava and Google announced a partnership to launch Gemini across Africa using Cassava's AI factories. In the same month, the company launched a new platform, Cassava AI Multi-Model Exchange (CAIMEx), across Africa. The platform will give access to AI systems such as OpenAI, Anthropic, and Google.

== Philanthropy and humanitarian initiatives ==
He has used his own family fortune to build one of the largest support programs for educating young people in Africa. At any given time his family foundations have supported and educated more than 400,000 children. Masiyiwa and his wife are also signatories of the Bill Gates and Warren Buffett initiative known as the Giving Pledge.

Masiyiwa has also been involved in supporting a diverse range of health issues including campaigns against HIV/AIDS, Cervical Cancer, malnutrition, EBOLA, and COVID-19. He is an avid environmentalist and together with Sir Richard Branson and others founded the environmental group, the Carbon War Room.

He took over from former UN Secretary General Kofi Annan, the chairmanship of AGRA, an organisation that supports Africa's smallholder farmers. In 2019 he stepped down from AGRA and now serves as Chairman Emeritus. In 2013, he was appointed co-chair of Grow Africa, the investment forum for Africa's agriculture, which helped mobilise over US$15 billion in investments for African agriculture.

Upon the cholera outbreak that happened in Zimbabwe in 2019, Strive Masiyiwa together with his wife donated a total of US$10m to fight against the disease. Moreover, he pledged US$60m to be used to build resilience against the disease.

In May 2020, he was appointed by South African President and African Union Chair Cyril Ramaphosa to serve as a Special Envoy to the African Union for COVID response where he served until early 2022. Later in 2022, Masiyiwa led an AU task force working on Food Security in Africa and addressed this crisis at the US Africa Summit in Washington DC in December 2022.

Together with his wife, they pledged $100m to establish a fund to invest in rural entrepreneurs in his home country. The two also started a non-profit organisation, Higherlife Foundation, which empowers disadvantaged children through education and creating opportunities for highly talented young people. Through one of the largest scholarship programmes in Africa, the Foundation pays the school fees for children in Zimbabwe, Lesotho and Burundi who they call their "history makers"

In January 2020 he paid for Zimbabwe's doctors to return to work after they struck to get paid. Masiyiwa agreed to pay each doctor a subsistence allowance of about $300 (£230) and provide them with transport to work, through a fund he set up. Most of the doctors on strike were earning less than $100 a month.

== Personal life ==
Masiyiwa is a Christian. He is married to Tsitsi Masiyiwa and they have six children, and live in London, England. Masiyiwa owns two adjacent apartments atop the 29-storey Eldorado Tower at 300 Central Park in New York City, bought for US$24.5 million in 2016.

In October 2024, Masiyiwa became the first black billionaire to enter the Sunday Times Rich List with a net worth of US$3.1 billion.

In 2025, Masiyiwa was named by Time Magazine on its list of the World's 100 Most Influential People in AI.
