= Chidi Odinkalu =

Nigerian human rights activist and lawyer

Chidi Anselm Odinkalu
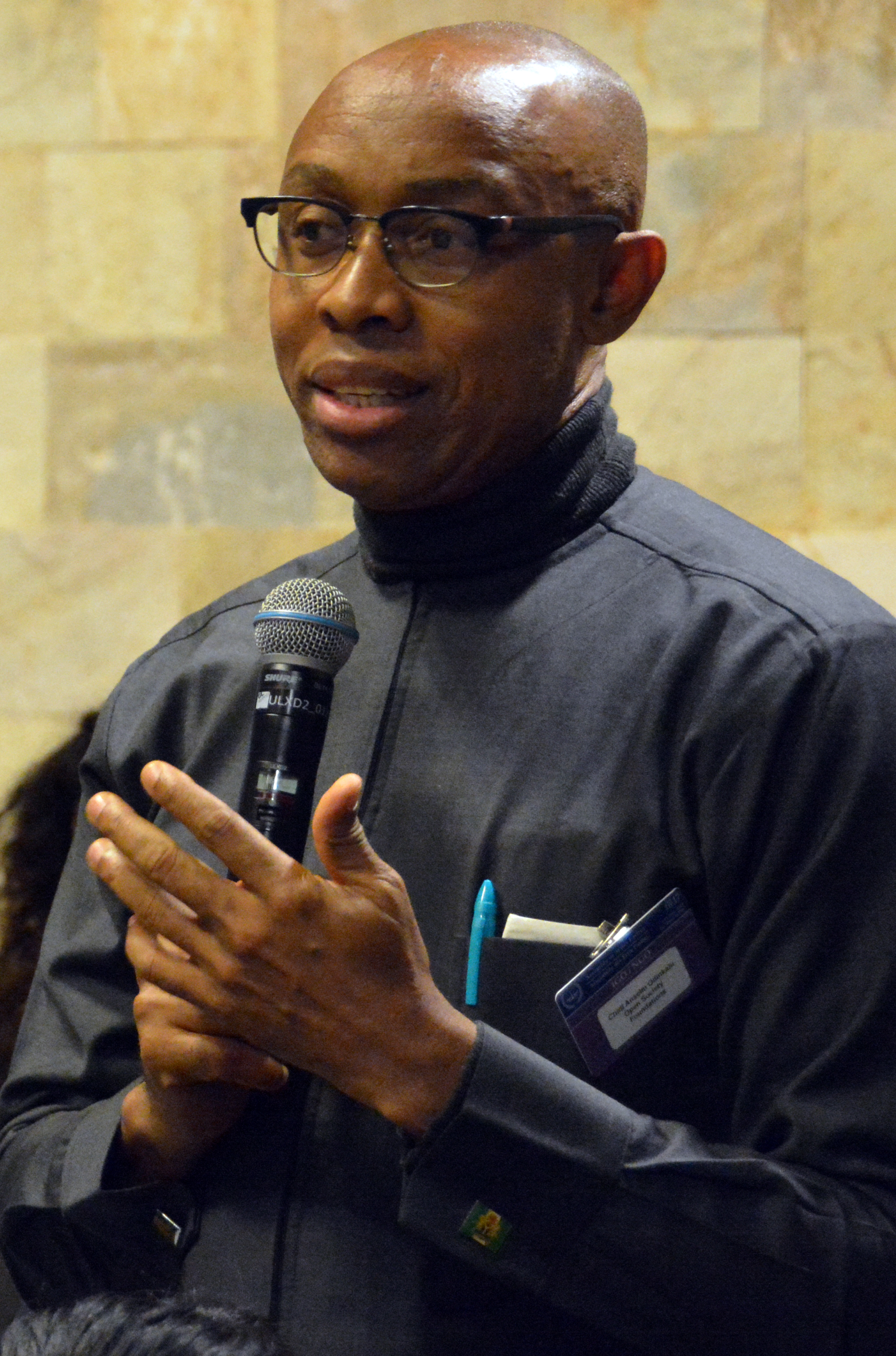
- Chidi Odinkalu in 2018
- Born: Ihiala, Anambra State
- Education: Imo State University, University of Lagos, London School of Economics and Political Science
- Known for: Activism; Human activism; Writing; Public Interest Law
- Title: Professor
- Partner: Iheoma Obibi
- Awards: USIA Fellowship

Chidi Anselm Odinkalu is a Nigerian human rights activist, lawyer, professor and writer. He was the former chairman of Nigeria's National Human Rights Commission (Nigeria) and was recently the senior team manager for the Africa Program of Open Society Justice Initiative.

He has worked as an advisor for the Ford Foundation New York, World Bank, African Union, International Council for Human Rights Policy, Geneva; and many others. August 2021, the Fletcher School of Law and Diplomacy at Tufts University appointed Odinkalu a Professor in Human Rights Law.

In 2018, he co-authored a book titled Too Good to Die with Ayisha Osori.

== Early life ==
Odinkalu was born in Ihiala, Anambra State to two teachers: Augustine Chukwuma Odinkalu and Anthonia Ihunna Odinkalu. He hails from Orlu, Imo State.

== Education ==
Odinkalu obtained his law degree (LLB) at Imo State University in 1987 and was called to the bar in 1988. He emerged as the best graduating student of the School of Legal Studies, Imo State University in 1987 and won the Chief FRA Williams prize for best student in Legal Drafting and Conveyancing in 1988. He obtained a master's degree in law at the University of Lagos in 1990 and holds a Ph.D in law from the London School of Economics and Political Science. Odinkalu is a visiting professor at The Fletcher School of Law and Diplomacy and Harvard Law School.

== Activism and career ==
He was the former chairman of National Human Rights Commission (Nigeria) and currently the senior legal officer for Africa, Open Society Justice Initiative. He became the assistant lecturer at the Faculty of Law, University of Ibadan between 1988 and 1989 and worked with the Civil Liberties Organization as director of projects and planning. During the 12 June 1993 Presidential election in Nigeria, there was intense pressure on human right activists including him based on the role he played at this moment. He left Nigeria to United Kingdom, where he became the legal officer for Africa, INTERIGHTS between July 1998 and February 2003. In 1998, United Nations Observer Mission in Sierra Leone appointed him as a Human Rights Advisor. In February 2003, Odinkalu was appointed as the senior legal officer for Africa for Open Society Justice Initiative (OSJI).
