= Ifeoma Uddoh =

Nigerian social entrepreneur, founder of Shecluded

- Citizenship: Nigeria
- Occupation: Social entrepreneur
- Known for: Fintech Credit

Ifeoma Hope Uddoh, or Ifeoma Nwakwesi Uddoh is a Nigerian social entrepreneur. She is founder of Shecluded, a fintech credit company aimed at women in Africa.

In December 2019 Uddoh was one of five female entrepreneurs to emerge as winners of a UK-Nigeria Tech Hub competition sponsored by the British High Commission in Lagos. The winners received sponsorship to travel to the United Kingdom for the January 2020 UK-Africa Investment Summit.
