= Tsitsi Masiyiwa =

Zimbabwean philanthropist, businesswoman, and social impact leader

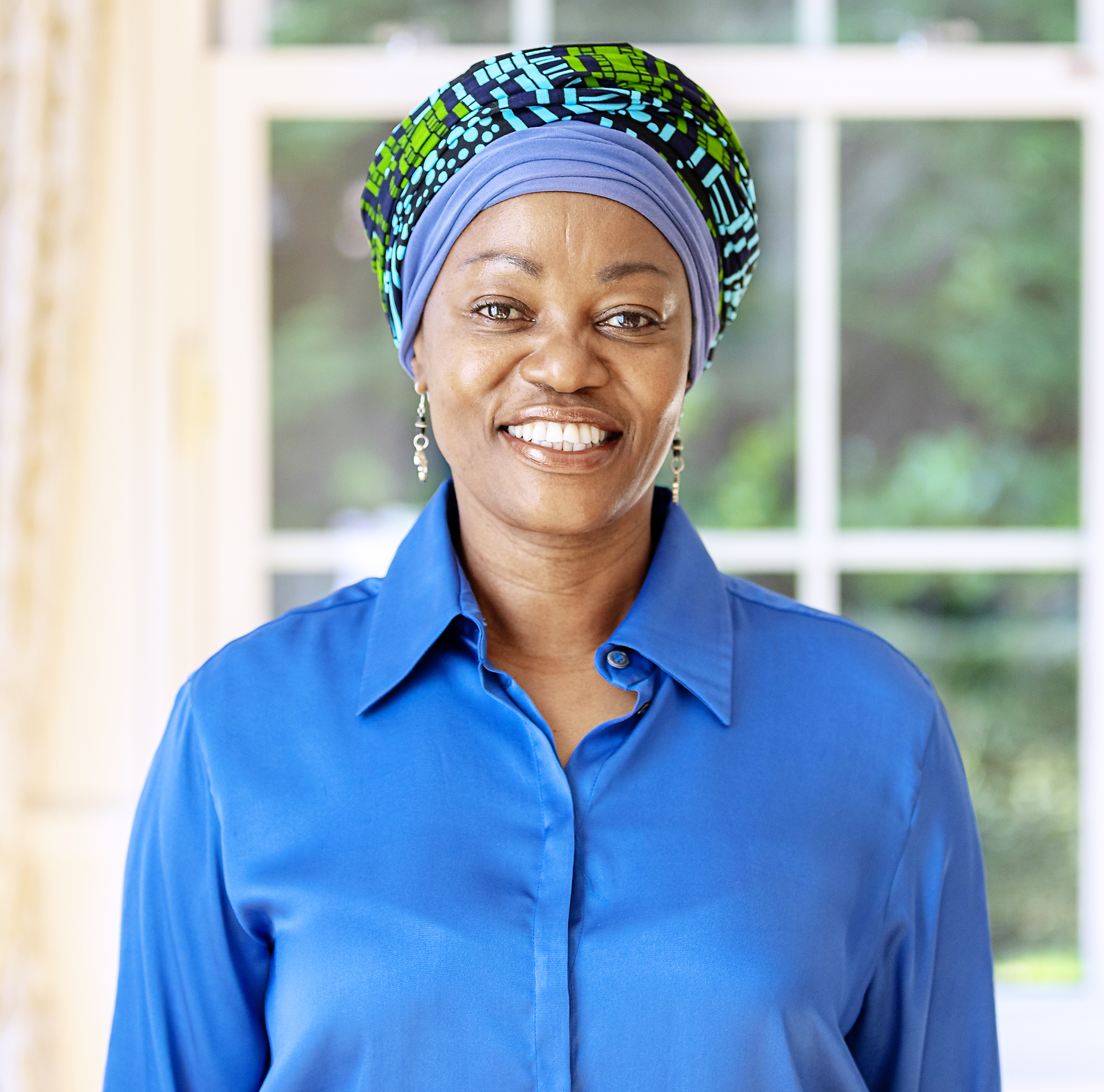
- Born: January 4, 1965 (age 61); Zimbabwe
- Citizenship: Zimbabwean
- Education: University of Zimbabwe
- Occupations: Philanthropist; Social Entrepreneur; Gender Advocate
- Partner: Strive Masiyiwa

Tsitsi Masiyiwa is a Zimbabwean philanthropist focused on human capital development in Africa. She advises universities, national leaders and social entrepreneurs on education, health, leadership development, gender equality and youth empowerment. She has received honorary doctorates from Bryant University, Africa University and Morehouse College.

Masiyiwa was named among Top 100 Influential Africans of 2023 by New African.

== Early life and education ==
Born in Harare, Zimbabwe, on January 4, 1965, Masiyiwa attended Chishawasha Primary School and the Dominican Convent High School in Harare. She earned a Bachelor's Degree in Business Studies in 1988 at the University of Zimbabwe and later completed an MBA (Masters of Business Administration) at the same university.

== Philanthropy and social impact ==
In 1996, Masiyiwa and her husband, Strive Masiyiwa, co-founded Higherlife Foundation. The foundation invests in education, health and sustainable livelihoods in Africa. Its programs include scholarships for orphaned and vulnerable children, support for academically gifted students, maternal and neonatal health initiatives efforts to eliminate neglected tropical diseases and cholera and training in climate-smart agriculture. Higherlife Foundation has also established emergency operations centres in Zimbabwe.

In 2017, Masiyiwa established Delta Philanthropies for impact investing and grant-making. Delta Philanthropies aims to address poverty through strategic partnerships and innovative development models.

== Leadership and influence ==
Masiyiwa serves as Board Chair of Higherlife Foundation and Delta Philanthropies. She is also a board member of the END Fund, Masana wa Afrika and Co-Impact. She is a member of the Sesame Workshop Global Advisory Group, the International Advisory Board for Texas A&M University, the Yale Institute of Global Health Advisory Board, the King's Trust International Africa Advisory Board and the Kenjin-Tatsujin International Advisory Council.

In 2014, Masiyiwa helped establish the African Philanthropy Forum, serving as a founding board member and Board Chair from 2016 to 2022. She advocates for the elimination of neglected tropical diseases and was appointed Board Chair of the END Fund in 2023.

In 2025, she was named one of the 19 Influential African Women in International Development by Leading Ladies Africa, alongside Caroline Kouassiaman, Jessica Horn, and Hafsat Abiola.

== Honors and awards ==
- Honorary Doctorate of Humane Letters, Morehouse College
- Chairman's Honorary Award, Zimbabwe Achievers' Awards
- Champions for Change Award for Leadership, International Center for Research on Women
- African Woman of the Year in Health and Education Award, New African Women Magazine
- Honorary Doctorate of Social Welfare, Africa University
- Points of Light Award (with her husband), awarded by Theresa May
- Inaugural List of 100 Most Influential African Women, Avance Media
- Forbes Africa Philanthropy Award
- Philanthropist of the Year, All-Africa Business Leaders Awards (AABLA) in partnership with CNBC Africa
- Dream Up, Stand Up, Speak Up (DUSUSU) Award
- Honorary Doctor of Humane Letters, Bryant University
- She has also served as a judge for the Rolex Awards for Enterprise, the Trinity Challenge and the Templeton Prize.

== Personal life ==
Masiyiwa is married to Strive Masiyiwaand they have six children, and live in London, England.
