= Iheoma Obibi =

Nigerian entrepreneur (born 1965)

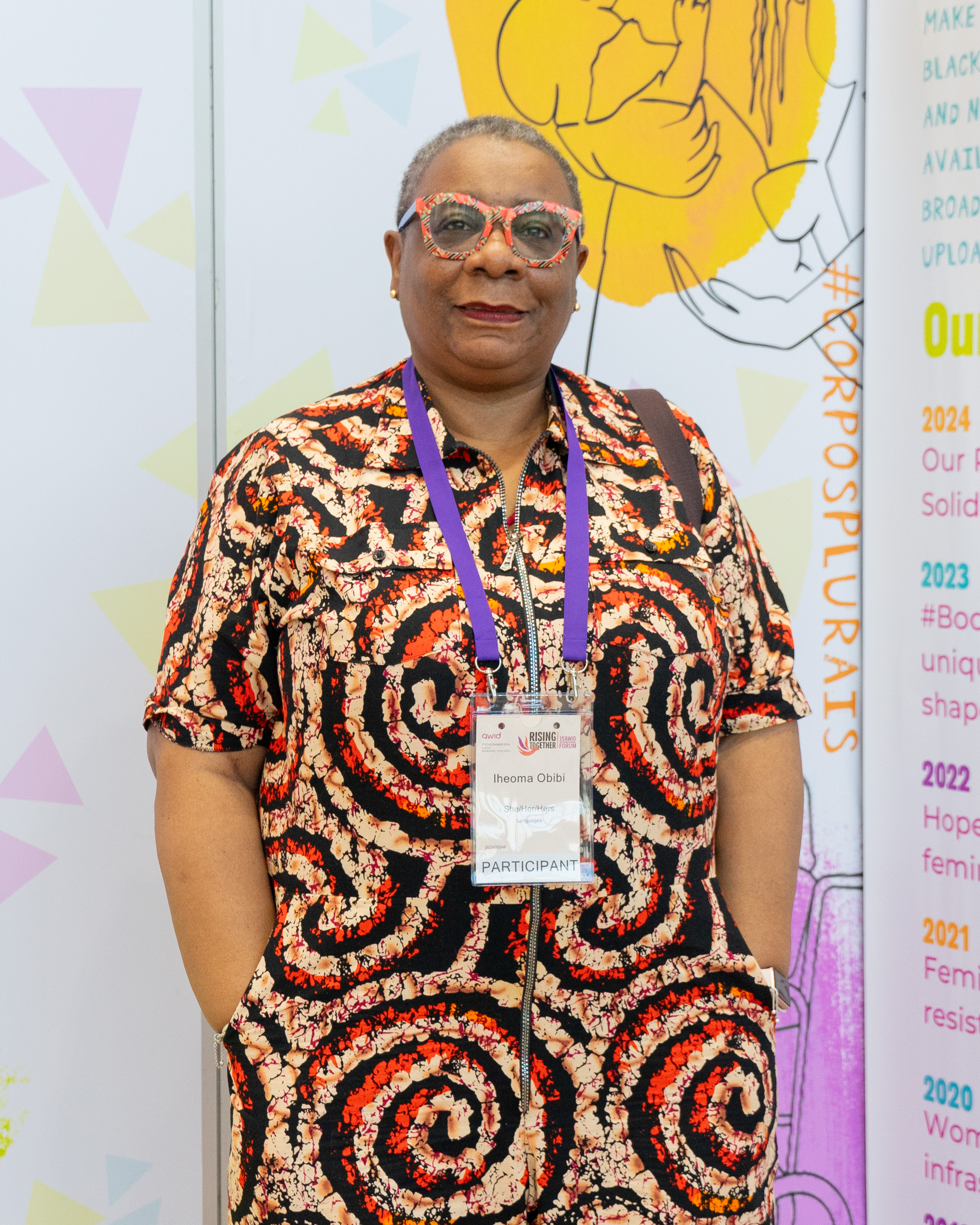
- Obibi at the 15th AWID Forum in Bangkok, Thailand, December 2024
- Born: Iheoma Kennaya Obibi; 7 August 1965 (age 61); Paddington, London, England
- Education: University of East London, City University, London
- Occupations: Writer, women's rights activist, entrepreneur
- Years active: 1960s - till date
- Organization: Alliances for Africa.
- Known for: Human rights activism
- Notable work: She has served as a consultant for local and international organizations, including UN Women, British Council, OECD, DfID
- Partner: Chidi Odinkalu
- Awards: Ashoka Fellow (2005); Listed by YNaija among the 100 Most Inspiring Women in Nigeria, 2015

Iheoma Kennaya Obibi is a British-Nigerian feminist writer, women and human rights activist, and entrepreneur. Obibi established Nigeria's first online intimacy shop, Intimate Pleasure.

== Biography ==
Iheoma Kennaya Obibi was born at St Mary's Hospital, Paddington, London, on 7 August 1965, to Nigerian parents, George Chikezie Obibi and Love Celine Obibi. George was a management consultant from Umuoba, Uratta, Imo State, while his wife was from Okwu, Uratta, Imo State. In 2010, Obibi established Nigeria's first online intimacy shop. She also appears on radio shows such as Madam Butterfly.

Obibi attended Clissold Park Secondary School in London, N16. She later studied at the University of East London and obtained her MA degree in Communications Policy Studies from City University, London. She lectured at North East London Polytechnic between 1992 and 1993.

Obibi is the author of Pastor Saul Bottomsup and a contributor to African Women Writing Resistance: An Anthology of Contemporary Voices."

== Activism ==
Obibi has been active in gender and human rights activism since 1996, serving as the director of Alliances for Africa (AFA), an African-led feminist Non-governmental organization based in Nigeria. She works in Sierra Leone, Kenya, Liberia, and Nigeria to emancipate African women, developing feminist leadership and building the feminist movement. She has served as a consultant for local and international organizations, including UN Women, British Council, OECD, DfID and the Commonwealth Secretariat.

Obibi was elected as an Ashoka Fellow in 2005 for her work "challenging the patriarchal nature of Nigerian politics by encouraging and preparing women to seek positions of authority at all levels of governance and bringing women to the forefront of decision-making bodies".

During the Obasanjo tenure, Obibi and her son, Dilim Odinkalu, were twice detained by the Nigerian SSS in relation to their Alliance for Africa activities, as well as the work of Obibi's partner Chidi Anselm Odinkalu with Open Society Justice Initiative. They were released following intervention from the UK.

== Recognition ==
In 2015, Obibi was listed by YNaija among the 100 Most Inspiring Women in Nigeria.
