= Ifeoma Onyefulu =

Nigerian children's author, novelist and photographer

Ifeoma Onyefulu (born 1959) is a Nigerian children's author, novelist, and photographer. She is best known for her picture books which feature her photographs of village life in Africa.

== Biography ==
Onyefulu was born in Onitsha, a city in Anambra State, located in the southeastern region of Nigeria. She is a member of the Igbo ethnic group of Nigeria, and lives in the UK. She also grew up in Nigeria. She married and moved over to Britain in 1982. She enrolled in a photographic training center in Earls Court, Britain. She subsequently gave up the business management course she was pursuing, because she got connected with photography in Britain. She began by taking photos for newspapers. She worked as a staff photographer on the Caribbean Times from 1986 to 1987. In 1991, she began to write as well. She has two children, who affected what she writes about. Her connection with her children and their schooling period made her to be more child-oriented in her writing and generally more interested in children.

== Awards ==
Her first book, A is for Africa, was chosen as one of Child Education's Best Information Books and Junior Education's Best Books. She has twice won The Children's Africana Book Award, for Here Comes Our Bride! in 2004 and for Ikenna Goes to Nigeria in 2007. She equally won The Best Book for Young Children in the US for Here Comes Our Bride! in 2005 and for Ikenna Goes to Nigeria in 2008.

== Bibliography ==
- A Is for Africa: An Alphabet in Words and Pictures, Cobblehill Books (New York, NY), 1993.
- Emeka's Gift: An African Counting Story, Cobblehill Books (New York, NY), 1995.
- Ogbo: Sharing Life in an African Village, Cobblehill Books (New York, NY), 1996, published as One Big Family: Sharing Life in an African Village, Frances Lincoln (London, England), 1996.
- Chidi Only Likes Blue: An African Book of Colors, Cobblehill Books (New York, NY), 1997.
- Grandfather's Work: A Traditional Healer in Nigeria, Millbrook (Brookfield, CT), 1998, published as My Grandfather Is a Magician: Work and Wisdom in an African Village, Frances Lincoln (London, England), 1998.
- Ebele's Favourite: A Book of African Games, Frances Lincoln (London, England), 1999.
- A Triangle for Adaora: An African Book of Shapes, Dutton Children's Books (New York, NY), 2000.
- Saying Goodbye: A Special Farewell to Mama Nkwelle, Millbrook (Brookfield, CT), 2001. ISBN 978-0761319658, 0761319654
- Welcome Dede!: An African Naming Ceremony, Frances Lincoln (London, England), 2003.
- Here Comes Our Bride!: An African Wedding Story, Frances Lincoln (London, England), 2004.
- An African Christmas, Frances Lincoln (London, England), 2005. ISBN 978-1845073879, 1845073878
- Ikenna Goes to Nigeria, Frances Lincoln (London, England), 2007. ISBN 978-1845075859, 1845075854
- Grandma Comes to Stay, Frances Lincoln (London, England), 2010. ISBN 978-1845078652, 1845078659
- New Shoes for Helen, Frances Lincoln (London, England), 2011. ISBN 978-1847801289, 1847801285
- Omer's Favorite Place, Frances Lincoln (London, England), 2011. ISBN 978-1847802415, 1847802419
- The Girl Who Married a Ghost: and Other Tales from Nigeria, Frances Lincoln (London, England), 2012. ISBN 978-1847801760, 1847801765
- Look at This!: Clothes, Frances Lincoln (London, England), 2013. ISBN 978-1847802644, 1847802648
- Look at This!: Food, Frances Lincoln (London, England), 2013. ISBN 978-1847802651, 1847802656
- Look at This!: Home, Frances Lincoln (London, England), 2013. ISBN 978-1847802668, 1847802664
- Look at This!: Play, Frances Lincoln (London, England), 2013. ISBN 978-1847802675, 1847802672
- Vicky Goes to the Doctor, Frances Lincoln (London, England), 2014. ISBN 978-1847803634, 1847803636
