= Akudo Oguaghamba =

Nigerian human rights activist

- Born: Nigeria
- Education: University of Nigeria Nsukka
- Occupations: Activist, Educator

Akudo Oguaghamba// is a Nigerian human rights activist, educator and founder of Women's Health and Equal Rights (WHER).

== Education ==
Oguaghamba is an alumnus of the University of Nigeria, Nsuuka and EQUITAS – International Centre for Human Rights and has over eleven years of leadership and project management experience.

== Work ==
She has published articles on LGBTQ+ and gender rights and was also a co-chair (Female) of PAN-AFRICAN ILGA (International Lesbian, Gay, Bisexual, Trans and Intersex Association). Oguaghamba actively engages in advocacy and awareness-raising activities to promote women's rights. Her research serves as a valuable resource for policymakers and activists working towards the eradication of gender-based violence in Nigeria. In her article titled "Gender-Based Violence in Nigeria: A Call for Action," she highlights the prevalence of violence against women in the country and the urgent need for effective interventions.

The Church's Auxiliary for Social Action. One of Oguaghamba's notable contributions to the field of women's rights is her research on gender-based violence in Nigeria.

== Women's Health and Equal Rights Initiative ==
Women's Health and Equal Rights (WHER) Initiative
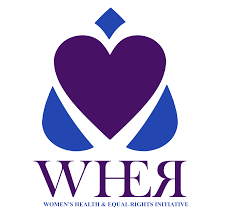
- Founded: 2011
- Type: NGO, Nonprofit
- Location: Abuja, Nigeria
- Products: Advocacy; empowerment; health and well-being; research and documentation; e-library (books)
- Key people: Akudo Oguaghamba
- Website: https://whernigeria.org/

Women's Health and Equal Rights Initiative (WHER) is a Nigerian feminist non-profit organization founded in 2011 in Abuja by Oguaghamba, and which is led by lesbian and bisexual women. It supports lesbians, bisexuals, and other sexual minority women (LBSMW). WHER promotes knowledge of sexuality and sexual orientation, provides a platform for the promotion of the wellbeing and protection of the rights of LBSMW, and provides access to health and other support services for LBSMW.

=== Programs ===
As a partner in the Solidarity Alliance for Human Rights and other alliances of individuals and organizations working on protecting and promoting the human rights of sexual and gender minorities, WHER advocates for the advancement and realization of human rights and equal access to opportunities for marginalized women in Nigeria. They also support transgender and gender-non-conforming people. Issues of marginalization that WHER works with include low literacy, education, and employment, along with stigma and discrimination. A volunteer with WHER spoke publicly against Same Sex Marriage (Prohibition) Act 2013 while legislators were discussing the bill, and the organizations's work has included advocacy and education for the public after the law was enacted.

WHER provides human rights training, counselling, and legal aid, and they have received funding from Mama Cash for this work. For example, Oguaghamba said that during the COVID-19 pandemic, WHER advocated for women facing extortion and persecution due to their orientations. They have implemented mental health and human rights training, financial empowerment workshops, consciousness-raising, and community education activities. WHER's Sister 2 Sister initiative trains leaders across the country to provide counseling, peer support and coordinate local community networks in their respective cities. WHER has received grant funding from FRIDA, The Young Feminist Fund, for activism and organising work. WHER has also advocated for changes to laws to support equal rights for LGBTQ people, in collaboration with other organisations.

The Women's Health and Equal Rights Initiative organises the annual African Pride Accelerated summit, which began in 2022. Participation in the summit is through a call for applications, during which activists, leaders, stakeholders, and individuals apply to take part. The goal of the summit is to advance LGBTQ equality in the country.

== See also ==
- LGBTQ rights in Nigeria
