= Olufunke Baruwa =

Nigeria gender activist

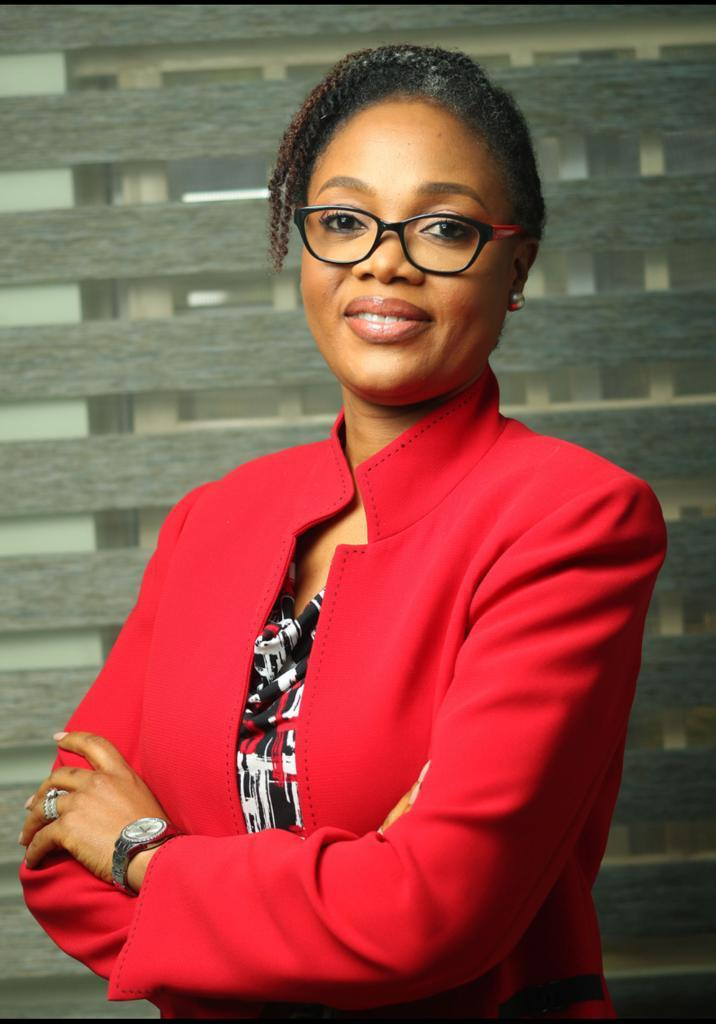
- Born: 9 November 1976 (age 49)
- Education: University of Abuja (BSc); University of Nigeria, Nsukka (MBA); University of East Anglia; University of York; University of Sussex (MA)
- Occupation: Activist
- Organization: Ford Foundation
- Known for: Gender, public policy and governance
- Website: https://funkebaruwa.com/

Olufunke Baruwa is a Nigerian gender and development practitioner, feminist and public speaker with a focus on gender, public policy and governance. For more than two decades, she has been at the forefront of social policies and reforms in Nigeria working with government, civil society, and international development partners.

== Education ==
Baruwa was educated at the University of Abuja (BSc) and the University of Nigeria, Nsukka (MBA), and completed further courses in gender, public policy, and management at the University of East Anglia and the University of York. In 2022, she received an MA in Corruption and Governance from the University of Sussex.

== Career ==
Baruwa is renowned for her advocacy on the inclusion of women in strategic political, social and economic positions in Nigeria. She served as the program officer at the defunct National Poverty Eradication Programme, gender advisor at the Office of the Senior Special Assistant to the President on MDGs from 2000 to 2015, and as a technical assistant on research, policy and planning in the Ministry of Communication Technology. In 2015, she was appointed as the chief executive officer (CEO) of the Nigerian Women's Trust Fund Nigerian Women Trust Fund – a technical and financial resource for women in politics and decision-making in Nigeria, where she set the strategic vision and mobilized resources succeeding Ayisha Osori. Prior to assuming the role as CEO of the Nigerian Women's Trust Fund, she served on the board of directors of the fund from 2011 to 2015. and in 2018, she was appointed co-chair of the board of directors, succeeding Amina Salihu. That same year, she joined the US Agency for International Development (USAID) / Nigeria as the Civil Society and Media Specialist in their Peace & Democratic Governance Office.

In 2020, Olufunke Baruwa started working in Ford Foundation’s West Africa Office as a program officer for gender, racial and ethnic justice, where she leads work on ending violence against women and girls.

== Recognition ==
Named as one of the 17 women changing the world by the Institute for Inclusive Development at its 2015 Colloquium held at the Harvard Kennedy School of Government in Cambridge, Massachusetts, Baruwa is a member of the Women Waging Peace Network.

She has been recognized for her work with Nigerian Women's Trust Fund by The Guardian, She Leads Africa, and other publications.

In 2021, Baruwa was one of Nigerian's transformational leaders participating in Harvard University's "Nigeria in The World" seminar series where she spoke about Nigerian's individuals and groups working to address gender-based violence in Nigeria and West Africa.

== Publications ==
Year	Publication	Publication Type
2018	Baruwa, Olufunke (1 August 2018). "Closing The Gender Gap". Common Knowledge Issue #6 by Commonwealth Scholarship Commission in the UK. pp. 16–17.	Magazine Article
2020	Baruwa, Olufunke (1 November 2020). Young Women in Politics in Nigeria: Issues and Prospects: A Case Study of the 2019 General Elections (Report).	Policy Brief
2022	Baruwa, Olufunke (20 October 2022), "2023: The stakes are higher and Nigerian women are at the top", Premium Times	Article
2023	Baruwa, Olufunke (11 April 2023), "From global conversations to local impact; lessons from IWD2023 and CSW-67", Premium Times	Article
2023	Baruwa, Olufunke (12 October 2023), "Twenty years of the Maputo Protocol: Progress, challenges and prospects", Premium Times Nigeria	Article
2023	Baruwa, Olufunke (17 October 2023), "The Pursuit of Justice and the Burden of Silence", Premium Times Nigeria	Article
2023	Nunn, Catriona (19 October 2023), "Olúfúnké Baruwa: The Ford Foundation", York for Life: Alumni Voices	Article
