= Political recruitment model =

Stages to become an elected official

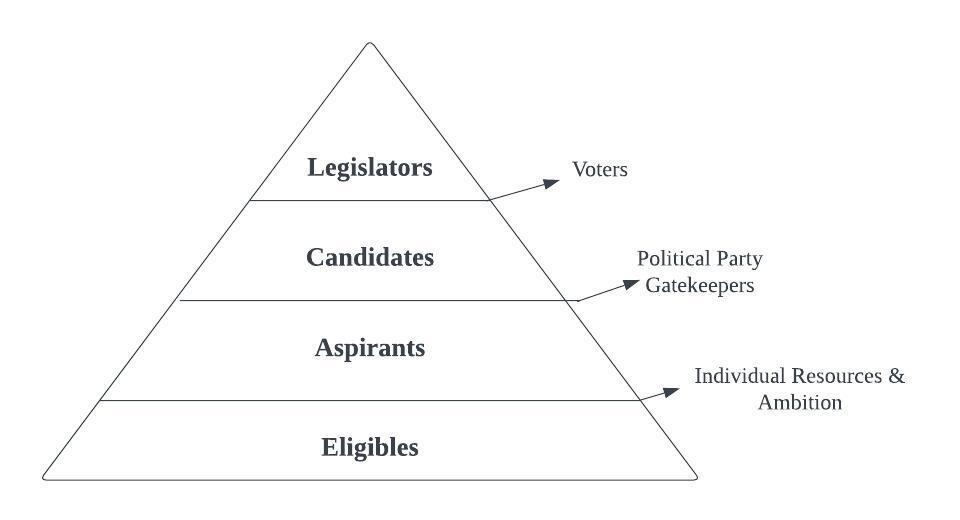
Political Recruitment Model Diagram. A citizen moves up from Eligibles to Legislator.

The political recruitment model is a framework, used by political scientists, to explain the stages a citizen goes through to become an elected official. The model has four stages: eligibles, aspirants, candidates, and legislators. There are barriers between each stage that has the potential to keep an eligible citizen from becoming a legislator. These barriers are individual resources and ambition, political party gatekeepers, and voters. The Political recruitment model is mainly utilized to study why women hold political office at lesser rates than men. Scholars use a supply vs demand model within the political recruitment framework to investigate where and why women "drop out" of the pipeline.

== Description and origins ==
The political recruitment model shows both the roles one takes to become an elected official as well as the barriers that keeps one from moving up the ladder to the next step. The first step, eligibles, are anyone who is legally able to run for political office. Eligibles then turn into aspirants when an eligible has the ambition and desire to hold office. The aspirant group is smaller than the eligible group. An aspirant turns into a candidate when they declare a candidacy and run. The candidate group is smaller than the aspirant pool. The final step in the recruitment model is an elected official.

Each step also has barriers that keep individuals from moving closer to becoming an elected official. Individual ambition and resources would stop someone from moving from eligibles to aspirants. Political party gatekeepers stop aspirants from moving to candidates. Finally, voters stop candidates from becoming elected officials.

The very broad idea of the political recruitment model was discussed by David C Schwartz in 1969, however, the stages and barriers weren't clearly defined until Pippa Norris' work in 1993. Schwartz examined how men entered political office in the United States whereas Norris examined how women entered the British political arena. Political scientists have expanded on Norris' model to examine gendered barriers to political office.

== Political recruitment model and gender gaps ==
The political recruitment model is used to analyze why women hold political office at lesser rates than men. When reviewing the model, feminist scholars look to see where and why women "fall off" the pipeline to becoming elected officials. Supply and demand concepts are utilized by scholars to divide the gendered barriers into two subcategories. The framing affects for the cause of women's underrepresentation can vary by race or ethnicity.

=== Supply barriers ===
When women fall off the political recruitment model between eligibles stage and the aspirants stage it is the result of a supply issue. A supply issue is when there aren't enough women who have the desire or motivation to run for office. Supply barriers seen in the political recruitment model are individual resources, and ambition. There are two main factors that affect the supply of women aspirants (women who have the desire to run for office) resources such as time, money, etc., and ambition.

==== Political ambition ====
Nascent political ambition is the desire to hold political office and eligibles must have nascent ambition to become aspirants. A study done by Richard L. Fox and Jennifer L. Lawless investigated where women were leaving the political recruitment model; they determined that women drop off at the aspirant stage. Women are less likely to consider running for office than men. When women do express interest in running, it is for lower-level positions.

===== Political ambition barriers =====
There are many different reasons why women have less ambition to run for political office than men. Scholars theorize that political socialization plays an important role. According to research of American children, girls are socialized to see politics as a "male sphere", this affects their career aspirations later in life. Additionally, women receive less support from parental figures to join the public sphere. Role models are another important aspect of political socialization. There is statistical evidence that shows the gender gap in girls career aspirations and educational attainment closes when women lead/hold political office. A study done by Coffé et al. (2023) displays another reason for political ambition barriers due to gaps within policy making due to gender. The study from the 2022 Flemish Political Ambition Survey mirrored a 0.71 gender gap on European ambition level implying that there are gender ambition gaps causing barriers for participation and when participation does take place it is more likely to happen on a local scale. Another important factor to this ambition gap is that there are gender differences in perceptions of qualifications and the importance of qualifications in determining who gets to run for political office. Women underestimate their qualifications and they put more emphasis on qualifications when it comes to moving from the eligible to aspirant stage. Campaign training programs can be seen as a supply focused solution; these program aim to increase women's political ambition by providing knowledge about the electoral process and by offering networking opportunities.

=== Demand barriers ===
When women fall off between the aspirant stage and the candidate stage, or between the candidate and legislator stage, it is the result of a demand issue. A demand framework describes a general desire expressed by voters, elites within political parties, and institutions for women to hold political office. Demand barriers can manifest in many different ways. Voter bias can be heavily gendered creating a barrier that keeps women from becoming legislators. The institutional structure of a state's government can have an effect on demand barriers. Political party gatekeepers can keep women from becoming candidates in both PR (proportional representation) government systems and majoritarian systems. In PR government systems, gender quotas, are a common tool used to mandate women's candidates thereby erasing the demand barrier of party gatekeepers.
