= Fauzia Nasreen =

Pakistani diplomat and teacher

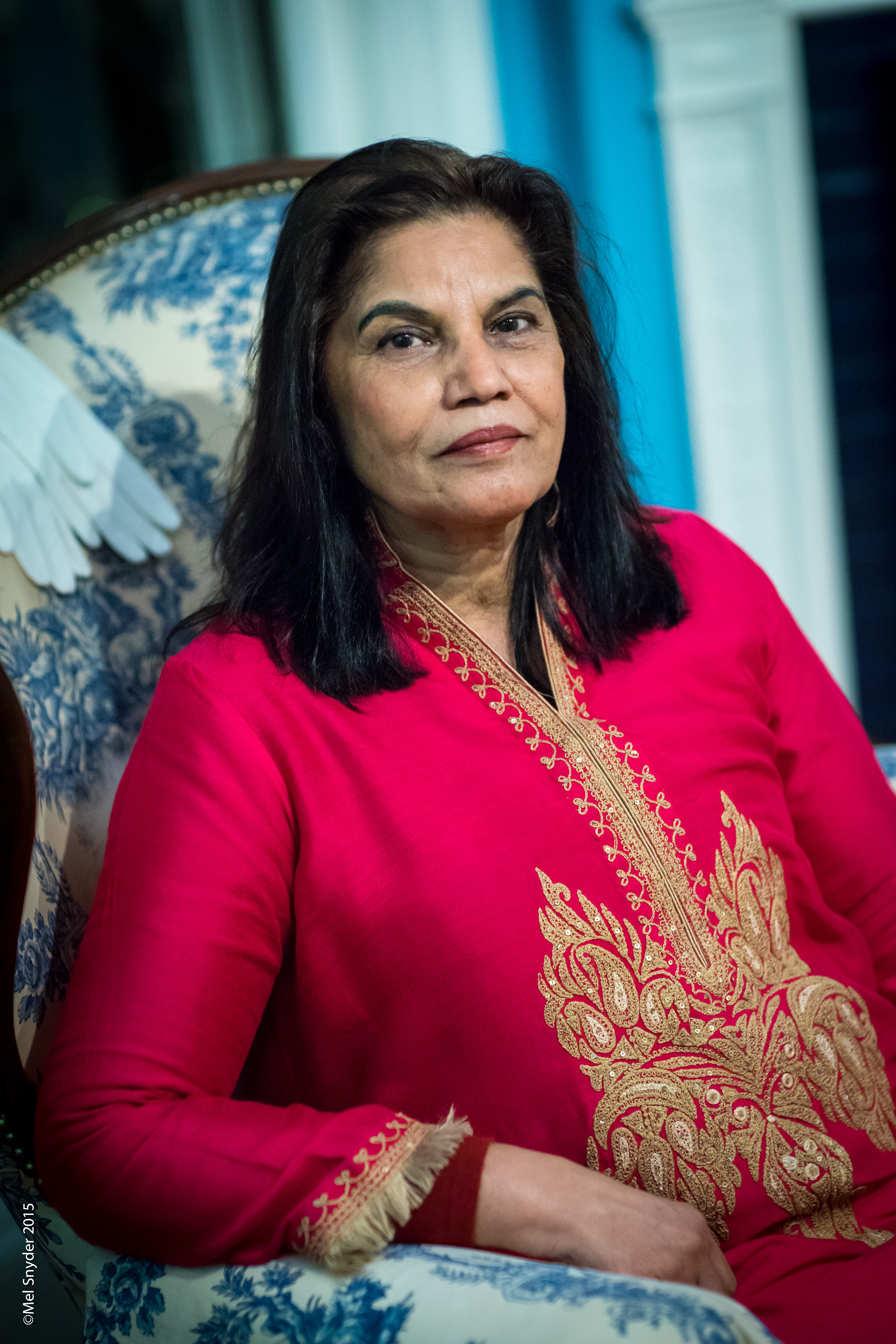
- Born: Fauzia Nasreen; 6 December 1950 (age 75)
- Occupations: Diplomat and academic
- Known for: Pakistan's ambassador

Fauzia Nasreen (Urdu: فوزیہ نسرین; born 6 December 1950) is a Pakistani diplomat and teacher. She was the first Pakistani woman to be a diplomat, and she was her country's ambassador to several countries.

== Career ==
Nasreen was born in 1950, and she entered the Foreign Service of Pakistan in 1973. She was posted to the Pakistani embassies in Iran, Malaysia, the Philippines, and Italy and rose to be her country's ambassador to Nepal, Poland, and the Czech Republic. She was also her country's High Commissioner in Australia from November 2009, with concurrent accreditation to Fiji. Since she ceased being a diplomat, she has been teaching in Pakistan and serves as an advisor at COMSATS University.

In 2023, she was still at COMSATS and offering advice to Ambassador Markian Chuchuk regarding relations between her country and Ukraine.
