= Esther Ibanga =

Nigerian pastor

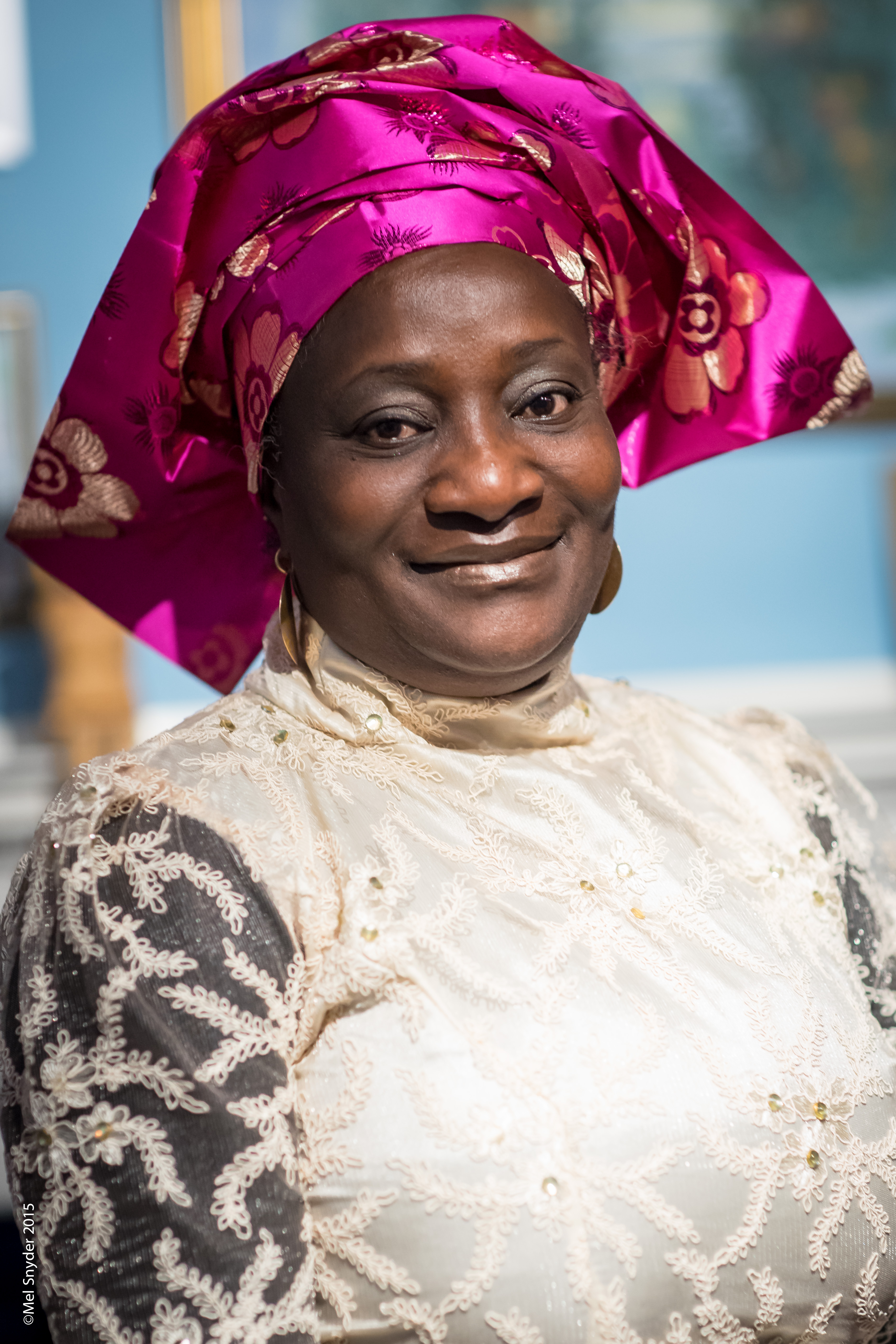
- Born: 31 March 1961 (age 65)
- Education: St. Paul Primary School, Kasuwan Kaji in Jos (1968-1973) St.Louis College, Jos Bachelor's Degree: Ahmadu Bello University, Zaria, Kaduna State (1979-1983) MBA: University of Jos
- Occupation: Pastor
- Spouse: Ikoedem Ibanga
- Children: 2
- Parents: Abumadga Auta (father); Mariamu Abimiku (mother)
- Awards: 32nd Niwano Peace Prize

Esther Ibanga (born 31 March 1961) is a Nigerian pastor and founder of the "Women Without Walls Initiative". She won the 32nd Niwano Peace Prize for promoting peace among people of different ethnic groups and religions in Jos, Nigeria.

== Life ==
Esther Ibanga was born on 31 March 1961 to Abumadga Auta and Mariamu Abimiku. She was the seventh of ten children and one of eight daughters. She is from Kagbu; Nasarawa Eggon Local Government Area of Nasarawa State in Nigeria. Her father was a policeman who won awards for his bravery and honesty. She says of him, “My father was a praying man and a prophet. We were born and raised into an atmosphere of prayer. He named me Baban Meche which means great woman.” Her strict mother, Mariamu Abimiku; was a housewife who was known as “mama mission” due to her involvement with the fellowship of the church (Zumantan mata) and the mission trips she embarked on. She is married to her husband of 25 years, Ikoedem Ibanga and has two daughters, Uyai and Ifiok.

== Education ==
Ibanga started her education at St. Paul’s Primary School, Kasuwan Kaji in Jos North Local Government Area of Plateau State from 1968 to 1973. She had her secondary school education at St. Louis College in Jos from 1973. In 1978 she enrolled for an advanced level program at the School of Basic Studies, Zaria, Kaduna State where she obtained an Interim Joint Matriculation Board (IJMB) Certificate. Her passion for business led her to obtain a bachelor's degree in Business Administration at Ahmadu Bello University in Zaria, Kaduna State from 1979 to 1983. In 2001, she obtained an MBA from the University of Jos.

== Work ==
Ibanga started her work experience in Nation Plan Consortium, where she served in the compulsory one year National Youth Service Corps program as a young graduate. After her NYSC, she worked at the Jos Steel Rolling Mills as a marketing officer, and then at the Central Bank of Nigeria, where she rose to be a manager. After working there for sixteen years, she left that job in 1995 to become the first woman to lead a church in Jos.

== Women Without Walls Initiative ==
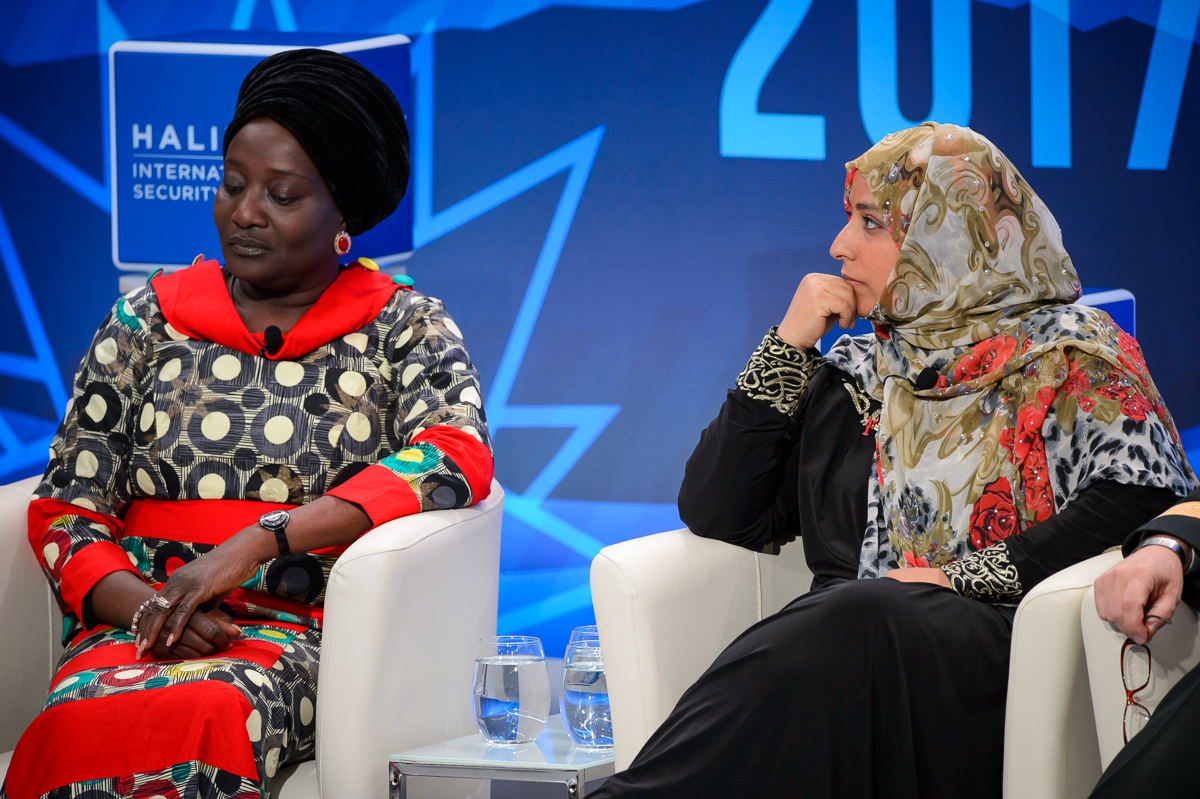
Ibanga with Nobel Peace Laureate Tawakkol Karman at the Halifax International Security Forum 2017

Esther is the founder and President of the "Women Without Walls Initiative" (WOWWI), an NGO meant to empower Nigerian women to actively take part in fighting for women's and children's causes. WOWWI was established in April 2010 during a decade of prolonged crisis in Plateau State. The organization focuses on six areas: advocacy, provision of aid to the poor and internally displaced persons, training women in peace building initiatives, promoting dialogue and mediation between warring parties, supporting developmental projects in underprivileged communities, and empowering women and youth. Reducing violence between the Christian and Muslim communities in Plateau State--especially in Jos North, a particularly tense area of interreligious conflict--is in particular a goal of the organization.

WOWWI's vision is to develop a “non-violent and all inclusive approach to conflict resolution and peace building in Nigeria, through women who are natural agents of change”. These activities include conferences (both locally and internationally), economic empowerment program for women, police-community dialogue, campaigns against electoral violence, rallies, etc. In February 2010 Ibanga led a march to protest against the Dogon Nahawa ethno-religious crisis in Plateau State. There was said to be 100,000 Christian women dressed in black taking part in the march. The march ended at the Government house in Jos where the participants, protested about the loss lives and particularly those of women and children.

Muslim women led by Hajiya Khadijat Hawaja protested about the killings in Jos as they too had lost children and husbands. Pastor Esther Ibanga agreed with the Muslim women and joined them to fight for an end to ethno-religious violence. Hawaja became WOWWI’s Financial Secretary.

In 2014 the Chibok schoolgirls kidnapping took place and WOWWI joined the "Bring Back our Girls campaign". In partnership with other women leaders on the Plateau, women from both faiths were mobilized and a protest rally was held, calling on the Nigerian government to expedite the search and secure release of the abducted Chibok girls. She also participated in a rally in Istanbul during an international conference.

She has not stopped on campaigning for the release of the Chibok girls. She speaks at conferences, seminars and workshops around the world to advocate for the release of those girls.
