= 1963 in Nigeria =

- Decades: 1940s; 1950s; 1960s; 1970s; 1980s
- See also: Other events of 1963; Timeline of Nigerian history

Events in the year 1963 in Nigeria.

== Incumbents ==
- Monarch:
  - Until 1 October: Queen Elizabeth II
- Governor-General:
  - until 1 October: Nnamdi Azikiwe
- President:
  - starting 1 October: Nnamdi Azikiwe
- Prime Minister: Sir Abubakar Tafawa Balewa
- Senate President: Dennis Osadebay (until 1 October); Nwafor Orizu (starting 1 October)
- House Speaker: Ibrahim Jalo Waziri
- Chief Justice: Sir Adetokunbo Ademola

== Politics ==
- 1 October 1963 - Nigeria became a republic within the Commonwealth of Nations.
- 1 October 1963 - the former Governor-General Nnamdi Azikiwe became the first President of Nigeria.
- 1 October 1963 - appeals from the Supreme Court of Nigeria to the Judicial Committee of the Privy Council in London were abolished, but cases then pending retained their right of appeal to the J.C.P.C. from the Nigerian court system.

== Births ==
- January 21 - Hakeem Olajuwon, basketball player
