= 1960 in Nigeria =

- Decades: 1940s; 1950s; 1960s; 1970s; 1980s
- See also: Other events of 1960; Timeline of Nigerian history

Events in the year 1960 in Nigeria.

== Incumbents ==
- Monarch:
  - until 1 October: position not in existence
  - starting 1 October: Queen Elizabeth II
- Governor-General: Sir James Wilson Robertson (until 16 November), Nnamdi Azikiwe (starting 16 November)
- Prime Minister: Abubakar Tafawa Balewa
- Senate President:
  - 1 January: position established
  - 1 January – 1 October: Nnamdi Azikiwe
  - starting 1 October: Dennis Osadebay
- House Speaker: Jaja Wachukwu (until 1 October); Ibrahim Jalo Waziri (starting 1 October)
- Chief Justice: Adetokunbo Ademola

== Politics ==
- July 1960 - Adesoji Aderemi became 1st African to be appointed governor in the Commonwealth
- October 1, 1960 - Nigerian Independence Day
- October 1, 1960 - Tafawa Balewa became prime minister
- October 1, 1960 - Sir James Robertson (1899 - 1983) became governor-general.
- November 16, 1960 - Nnamdi Azikiwe (1904–1996) became governor general
