= 1961 in Nigeria =

- Decades: 1940s; 1950s; 1960s; 1970s; 1980s
- See also: Other events of 1961; Timeline of Nigerian history

Events in the year 1961 in Nigeria.

== Incumbents ==
- Monarch: Queen Elizabeth II
- Governor-General: Nnamdi Azikiwe
- Prime Minister: Abubakar Tafawa Balewa
- Senate President: Dennis Osadebay
- House Speaker: Ibrahim Jalo Waziri
- Chief Justice: Adetokunbo Ademola

== Politics ==
- February 1961 - British Cameroons referendum
- 1 June 1961 - southern Cameroon became a Province within Northern Nigeria.
- October 1961 - Northern Cameroon dissociated from Nigeria.
