= 1962 in Nigeria =

- Decades: 1940s; 1950s; 1960s; 1970s; 1980s
- See also: Other events of 1962; Timeline of Nigerian history

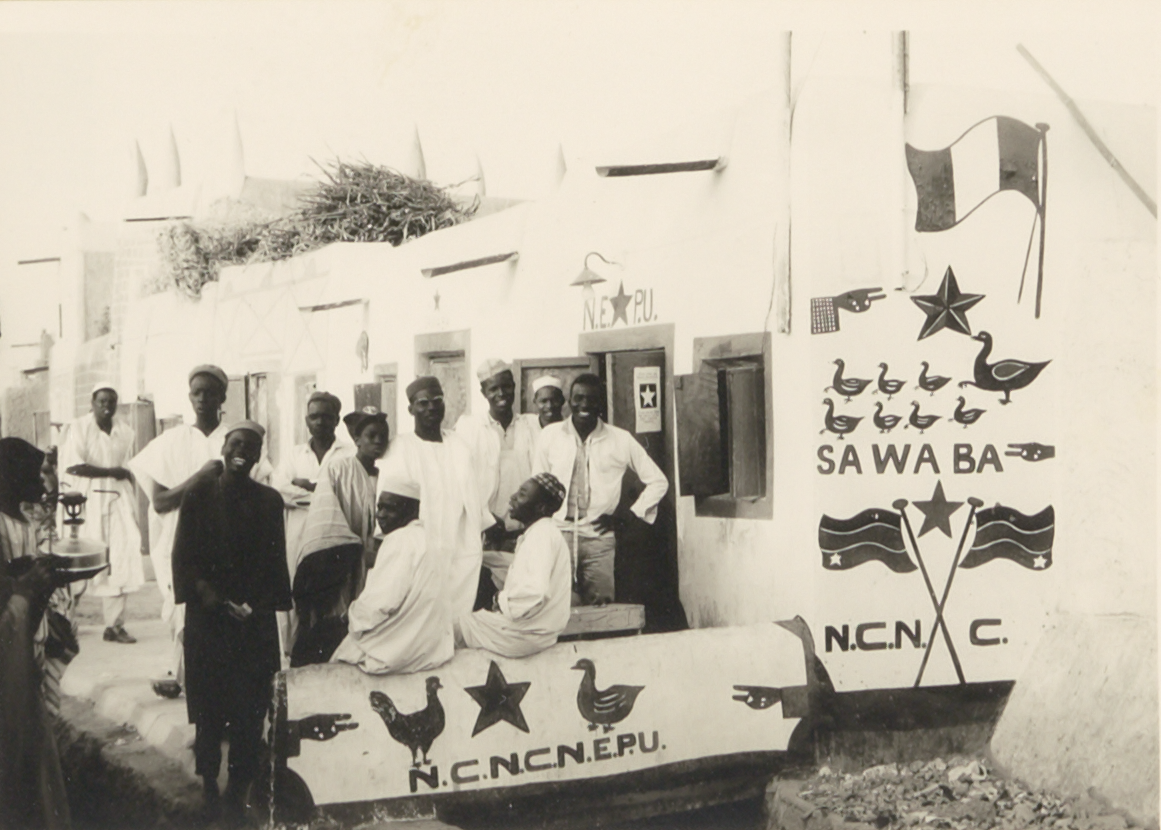

1962 in Nigeria

== Incumbents ==
- Monarch: Queen Elizabeth II
- Governor-General: Nnamdi Azikiwe
- Prime Minister: Abubakar Tafawa Balewa
- Senate President: Dennis Osadebay
- House Speaker: Ibrahim Jalo Waziri
- Chief Justice: Adetokunbo Ademola

== Politics ==
- May 1962 – Action Group, a Western Region party led by Chief Obafemi Awolowo, split into two, resulting in a crisis in western Nigeria.
