= 1964 in Nigeria =

- Decades: 1940s; 1950s; 1960s; 1970s; 1980s
- See also: Other events of 1964; Timeline of Nigerian history

This article is about the particular significance of the year 1964 to Nigeria and its people.

== Incumbents ==
- President: Nnamdi Azikiwe
- Prime Minister: Abubakar Tafawa Balewa
- Senate President: Nwafor Orizu
- House Speaker: Ibrahim Jalo Waziri
- Chief Justice: Adetokunbo Ademola

== Events ==
- February - Mid-West Region legislative election takes place with National Council of Nigerian Citizens winning the majority of seats
- October - Nigeria participates in the 1964 Summer Olympics and wins its first medal
- December - the Nigerian parliamentary election starts and continues into 1965
- The National Library of Nigeria whose construction started in 1962 opens
- Construction of the Kanji Dam begins
- The Nigerian Defence Academy is established

== Births ==
- 2 February - Goodluck Nanah Opiah, politician and former speaker of the Imo State House of Assembly, Nigeria.
- Tubal Rabbi Cain, writer

== Deaths ==
- 20 January - Cyprian Michael Iwene Tansi, Roman Catholic priest who worked in Nnewi, Dunukofia, Akpu/Ajalli and Aguleri. and was later beatified by Pope John Paul II (born 1903)
