= 1966 in Nigeria =

Events in the year 1966 in Nigeria.

== Military coup ==
On January 15, 1966, Nigeria was jolted awake by its first military coup d'état. Across the country, high-ranking politicians, including Prime Minister Sir Abubakar Tafawa Balewa, Sir Ahmadu Bello, Festus Okotie-Eboh, and Ladoke Akintola, were assassinated by young, ambitious officers. The coup was orchestrated by a group of young majors and was subsequently referred to as the "Coup of the Five Majors", after a comment made by its most visible member, Major Chukwuma Kaduna Nzeogwu. The mutineers overthrew several cities but were overpowered and imprisoned after two days.

A new government was formed, and Johnson Aguiyi-Ironsi became Head of State. However, six months later, a counter-coup occurred during which he and his host, Francis Adekunle Fajuyi, were assassinated. Yakubu Gowon succeeded him.

Individuals of Igbo descent, particularly those from the Eastern Region, were targeted in several violent attacks. Chinua Achebe's book There Was a Country provides a powerful personal account of these events. He recounts how soldiers searched for him at his former address and then his office, apparently suspecting that his novel A Man of the People was connected to the coup.

According to historical accounts, in October 1966, the Federal Public Service Commission relieved 40 non-Eastern Nigerian workers of their duties, giving them an ultimatum to return to their home regions or permanently forfeit their jobs. Fearing for their safety amidst the ongoing unrest, these individuals fled the areas where they had previously been employed across the country.

== Agriculture ==
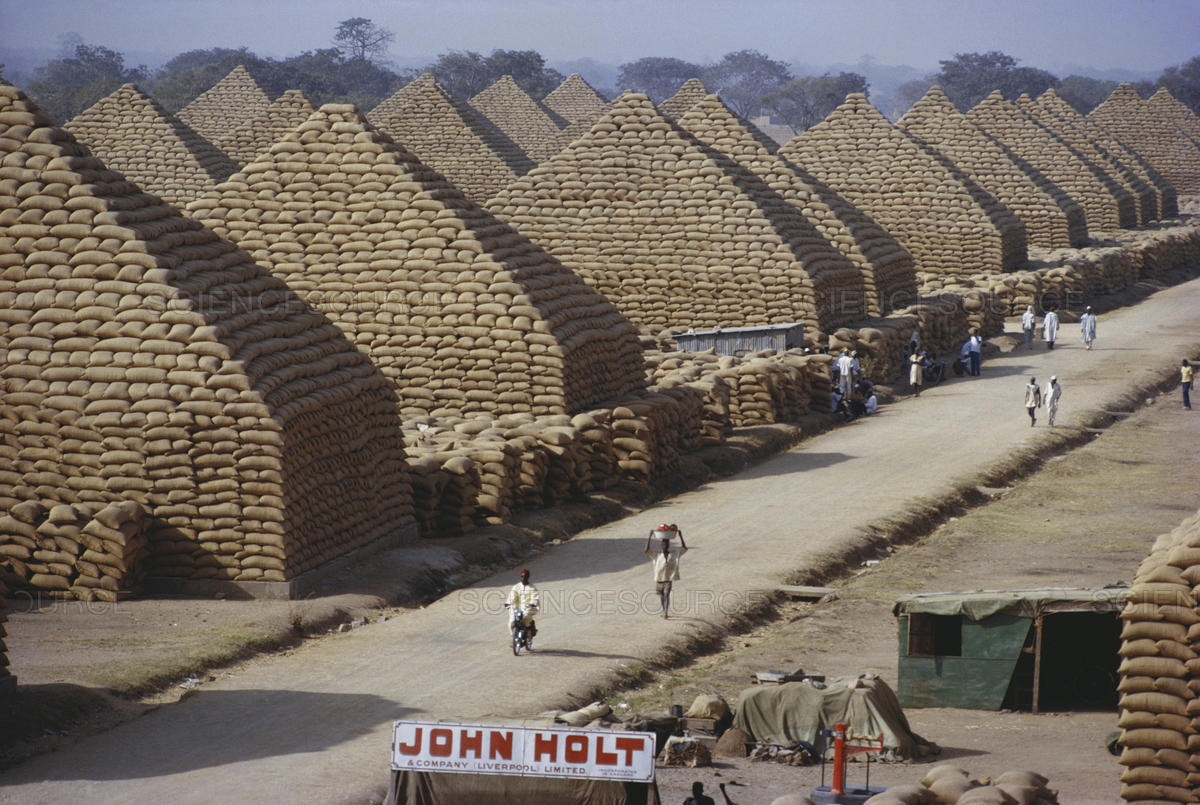
Agriculture in the Sixties.

Prior to the oil boom, Nigeria's economy was largely agrarian, with the Kano Groundnut Pyramids serving as a prominent feature in the northern region. These pyramids, consisting of thousands of bagged groundnuts, thrived as a hub of business activity, providing significant financial windfall for local farmers as the crop was exported globally.

== Sports ==
In November 1966, at the Commonwealth Games in Kingston, Jamaica, Nigerian athlete Samuel Igun won the gold medal in the hop, step, and jump event, setting a new games record.

== Entertainment ==
That same year, Nigerian musician Sir Victor Uwaifo received the first-ever gold record in Africa for his hit song "Joromi", which was presented to him by Mr. Jan Lewen, the Managing Director of Philips Records West Africa.

== Incumbents ==
- President:
  - Until 16 January: Nnamdi Azikiwe
  - 16 January – 29 July: Johnson Aguiyi-Ironsi
  - 29 July – 1 August: vacant
  - Starting 1 August: Yakubu Gowon
- Prime Minister:
  - Until 15 January: Abubakar Tafawa Balewa
  - Starting 16 January: position abolished
- Vice President:
  - Until 16 January: position not in existence
  - 16 January – 29 July: Babafemi Ogundipe
  - Starting 29 July: Joseph Edet Akinwale Wey
- Senate President:
  - Until 15 January: Nwafor Orizu
  - Starting 15 January: position abolished
- House Speaker:
  - Until 15 January: Ibrahim Jalo Waziri
  - Starting 15 January: position abolished
- Commissioner of Defence:
  - Until 15 January: Inuwa Wada
  - 15 January – 29 July: vacant
  - Starting 1 August: Yakubu Gowon
- Chief of Army Staff:
  - Until 15 January: Johnson Aguiyi-Ironsi
  - 15 January – 29 July: Yakubu Gowon
  - Starting 29 July: Joseph Akahan
- Chief Justice: Sir Adetokunbo Ademola

== Events ==
=== January ===
- January 10, 1966 — Diplomats of the British Commonwealth meet in Lagos to discuss the Rhodesian secession crisis.
- January 15, 1966 — The first of many military coups in Nigeria deposes the Nigerian First Republic; Prime Minister Tafawa Balewa, was assassinated along with the premier of Northern Nigeria, Ahmadu Bello, and the Finance Minister, Festus Okotie-Eboh.
- January 16, 1966 — The Federal Military Government is formed, with General Johnson Aguiyi-Ironsi as the Head of State and Supreme Commander of the Federal Republic.

=== July ===
- July 16, 1966 —The "Lagos Convention" calls for Nigeria's entry to the Common Market of the European Economic Community. Babafemi Ogundipe signs on behalf of the government. The convention will remain unratified and no agreement will go into effect until the signing of the Lomé Convention in 1976.
- July 29, 1966 — A counter-coup by military officers of northern extraction, deposes the Federal Military Government; General Johnson Aguiyi-Ironsi is assassinated along with Adekunle Fajuyi, Military Governor of Western Region. General Yakubu Gowon becomes Head of State.
