= Federation of Nigeria =

African country from 1960 to 1963

- 1954–1963
- Flag (1960–1963) Coat of arms (1960–1963)
- Motto: "Unity and Faith"
- Anthem: God Save the Queen (until 1960); Nigeria, We Hail Thee (from 1960)
- Territory of the Federation of Nigeria after integrating Northern Cameroons in 1961
- Status: British protectorate (1954–1960); Sovereign state (1960–1963)
- Capital: Lagos
- Government: Federation as British protectorate (1954–1960); Federal parliamentary constitutional monarchy (1960–1963)
- Monarch
  - 1954–1960: Elizabeth II (as Queen of the United Kingdom)
  - 1960–1963: Elizabeth II (as Queen of Nigeria)
- Governor-General
  - 1954–1955: Sir John Stuart Macpherson
  - 1955–1960: Sir James Wilson Robertson
  - 1960–1963: Nnamdi Azikiwe
- Prime Minister
  - 1960–1963: Sir Abubakar Tafawa Balewa
- Legislature: Parliament
  - Upper house: Senate
  - Lower house: House of Representatives
- Historical era: Cold War
  - Established: 1954
  - Independence: 1 October 1960
  - Northern Cameroons integration: 1 June 1961
  - Republican constitution: 1 October 1963
- Currency: Nigerian pound
| Preceded by | Succeeded by |
| Colony and Protectorate of Nigeria | First Nigerian Republic |

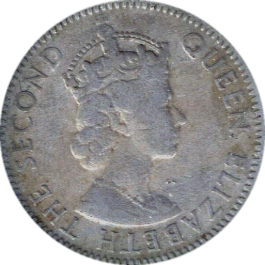
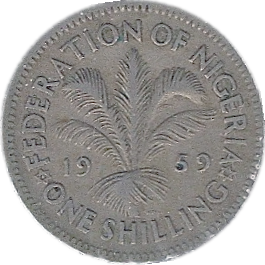
Nigerian 1-shilling coin, 1959

The Federation of Nigeria was a predecessor to modern-day Nigeria from 1954 to 1963. It was a British protectorate until its independence on 1 October 1960. The Federation consisted of three regions:

- Northern Region of Nigeria
- Western Region of Nigeria
- Eastern Region of Nigeria

British rule of Colonial Nigeria ended in 1960, when the Nigeria Independence Act 1960 made the federation an independent sovereign state. Elizabeth II remained head of state as the Queen of Nigeria, as well as other dominions and commonwealth realms. Her constitutional roles in Nigeria were exercisable by the Governor-General of Nigeria. Three people held the office of governor-general during the whole existence of the Federation of Nigeria:

1. Sir John Stuart Macpherson 1954 – 15 June 1955
2. Sir James Wilson Robertson 15 June 1955 – 16 November 1960
3. Nnamdi Azikiwe 16 November 1960 – 1 October 1963

Sir Abubakar Tafawa Balewa held office as prime minister (and head of government).

The Federal Republic of Nigeria came into existence on 1 October 1963. The monarchy was abolished and Nigeria became a republic within the Commonwealth. Following the abolition of the monarchy, former Governor-General Nnamdi Azikiwe became President of Nigeria, as a ceremonial post under the 1963 constitution.

Elizabeth II visited Nigeria in 1956 (28 January – 16 February).

== Stamps of the Federation ==
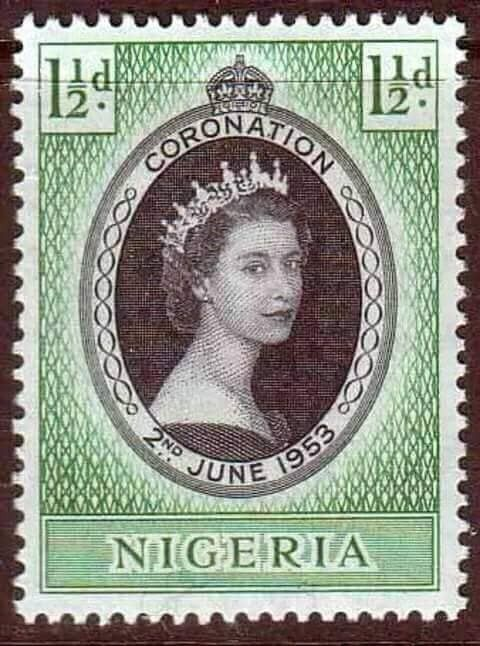
Coronation stamp, 1953

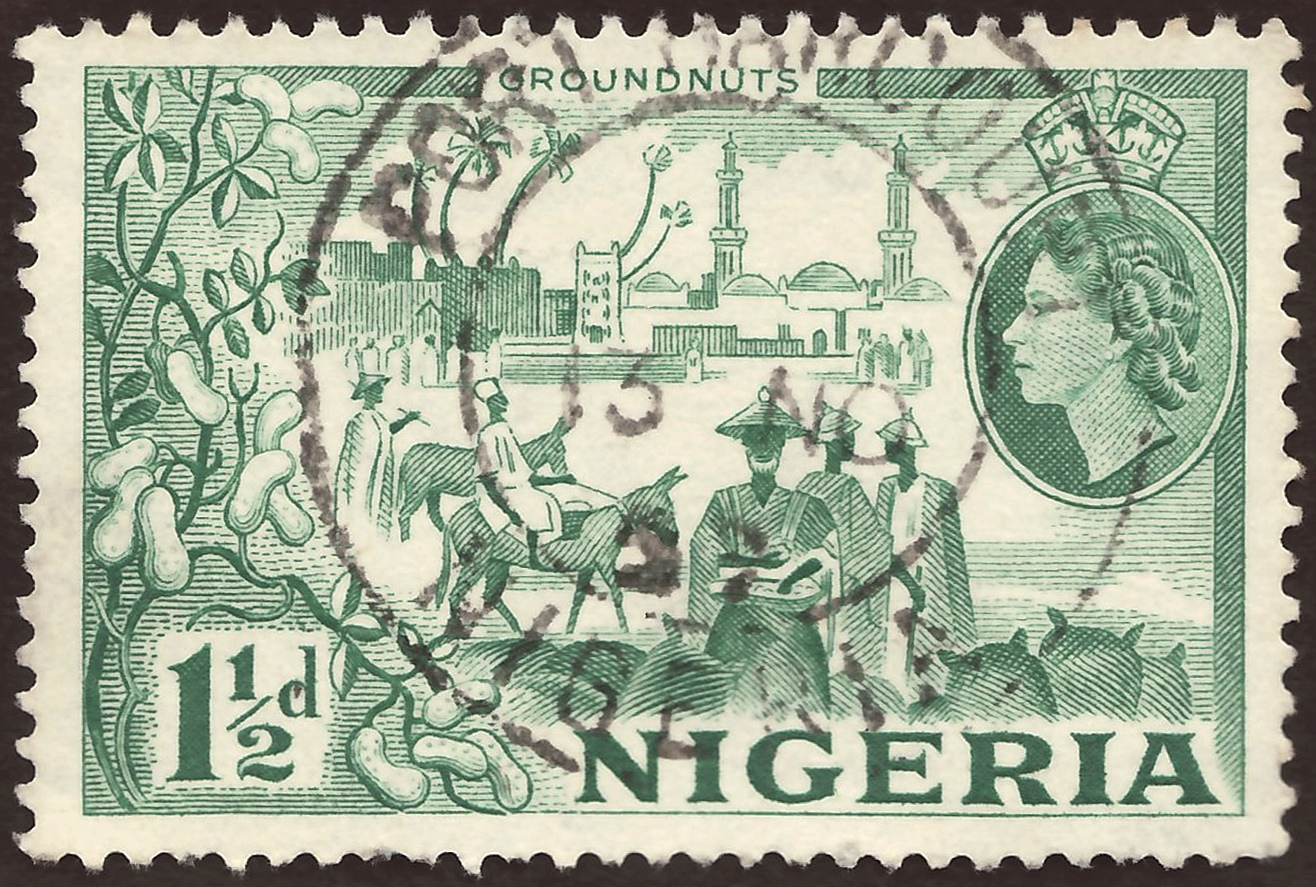
Depicting the groundnuts harvest, 1953

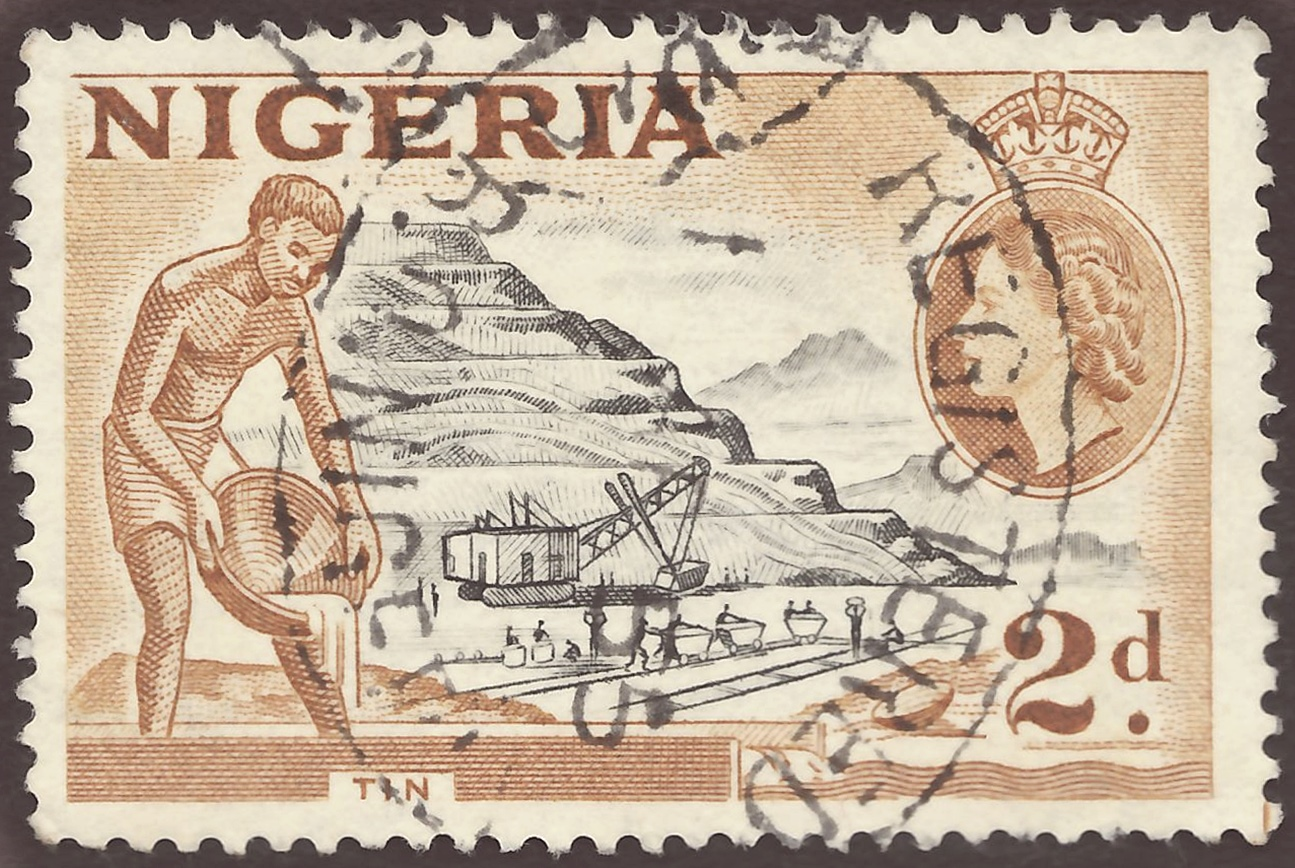
Depicting tin mining in Nigeria, 1953

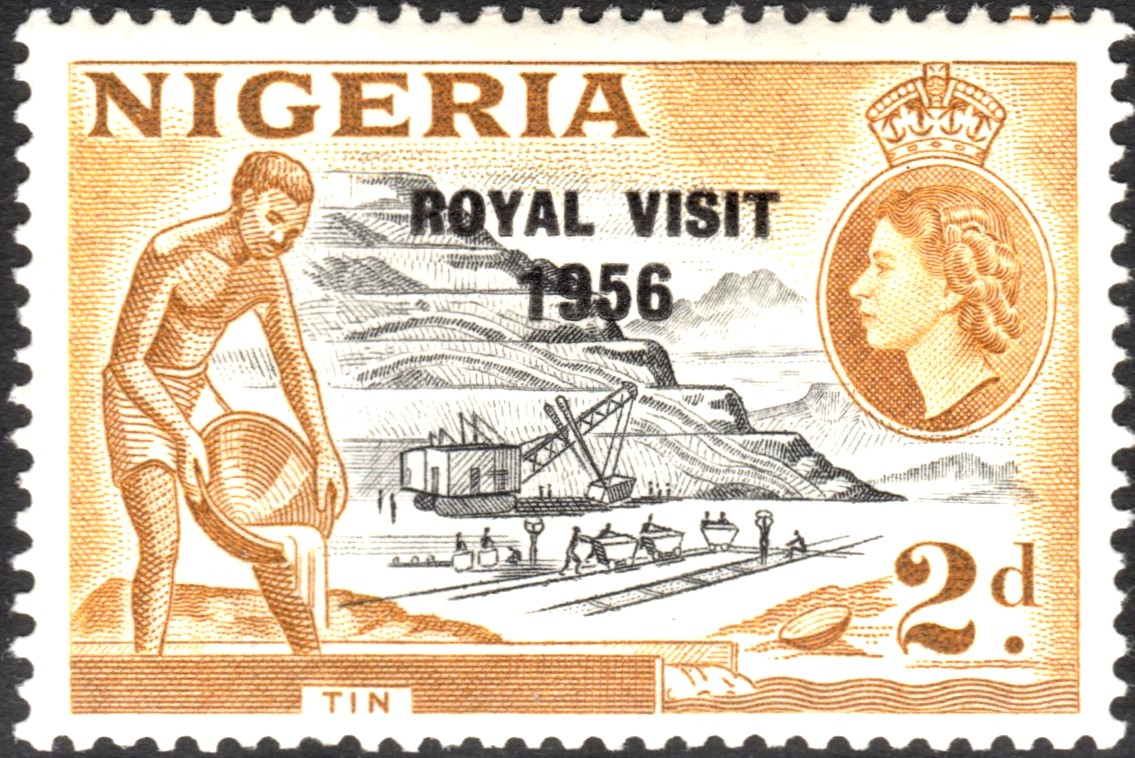
Overprinted to mark the Queen's visit in 1956

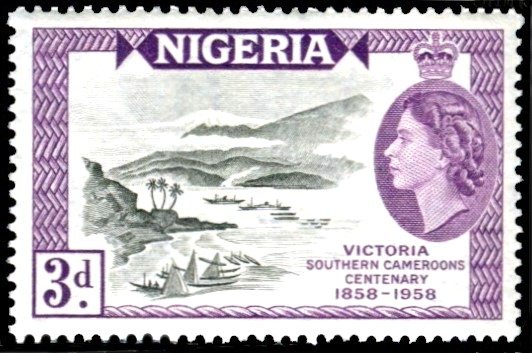
Commemorating the centenary of the city of Victoria, 1958

== See also ==
- Federalism in Nigeria
