= 1996 in Nigeria =

- Decades: 1970s; 1980s; 1990s; 2000s; 2010s
- See also: Other events of 1996; Timeline of Nigerian history

Events in the year 1996 in Nigeria.

== Incumbents ==
- Head of State – Sani Abacha
- Chief of General Staff – Oladipo Diya

== Births ==
- 20 January – Ese Brume, athlete
- 29 January – Junior Ajayi, footballer
- 28 February – Stanley Amuzie, footballer
- 3 May – Alex Iwobi, footballer
- 17 May – Abbas Abubakar Abbas, Bahraini athlete
- 22 August – Saviour Godwin, footballer
- 3 October – Kelechi Iheanacho, footballer
- 7 October – Divine Oduduru, athlete
- 17 October – Ayomide Folorunso, Italian athlete
- 12 November – Rafiatu Lawal, weightlifter
- 16 December – Wilfred Ndidi, footballer
