= 2003 Kebbi State gubernatorial election =

2003 gubernatorial election in Kebbi State, Nigeria

- April 19, 2003
Nominee	Adamu Aliero	Saidu Samaila Sambawa
Party	ANPP	PDP
Running mate	Sulaiman Muhammad Argungu	Sidi Bawa
Popular vote	502,903	299,120
Governor before election
Adamu Aliero
ANPP
Elected Governor
Adamu Aliero
ANPP

The 2003 Kebbi State gubernatorial election occurred on April 19, 2003. ANPP candidate Adamu Aliero won the election, defeating PDP Saidu Samaila Sambawa and 2 other candidates.

== Results ==
Adamu Aliero from the ANPP won the election. Four candidates contested the election.

The total number of registered voters in the state was 1,343,549; total votes cast were 886,324; valid votes were 802,509; and rejected votes were 83,815.

- Adamu Aliero, (ANPP)- 502,903
- Saidu Samaila Sambawa, PDP- 299,120
- Wali Ahmed, NDP- 252
- Kabiru Tanimu Turaki, UNPP- 234
