= Tafawa Balewa's tomb =

Former Nigeria leader tomb

Coordinates: 10°19′07″N 9°50′46″E

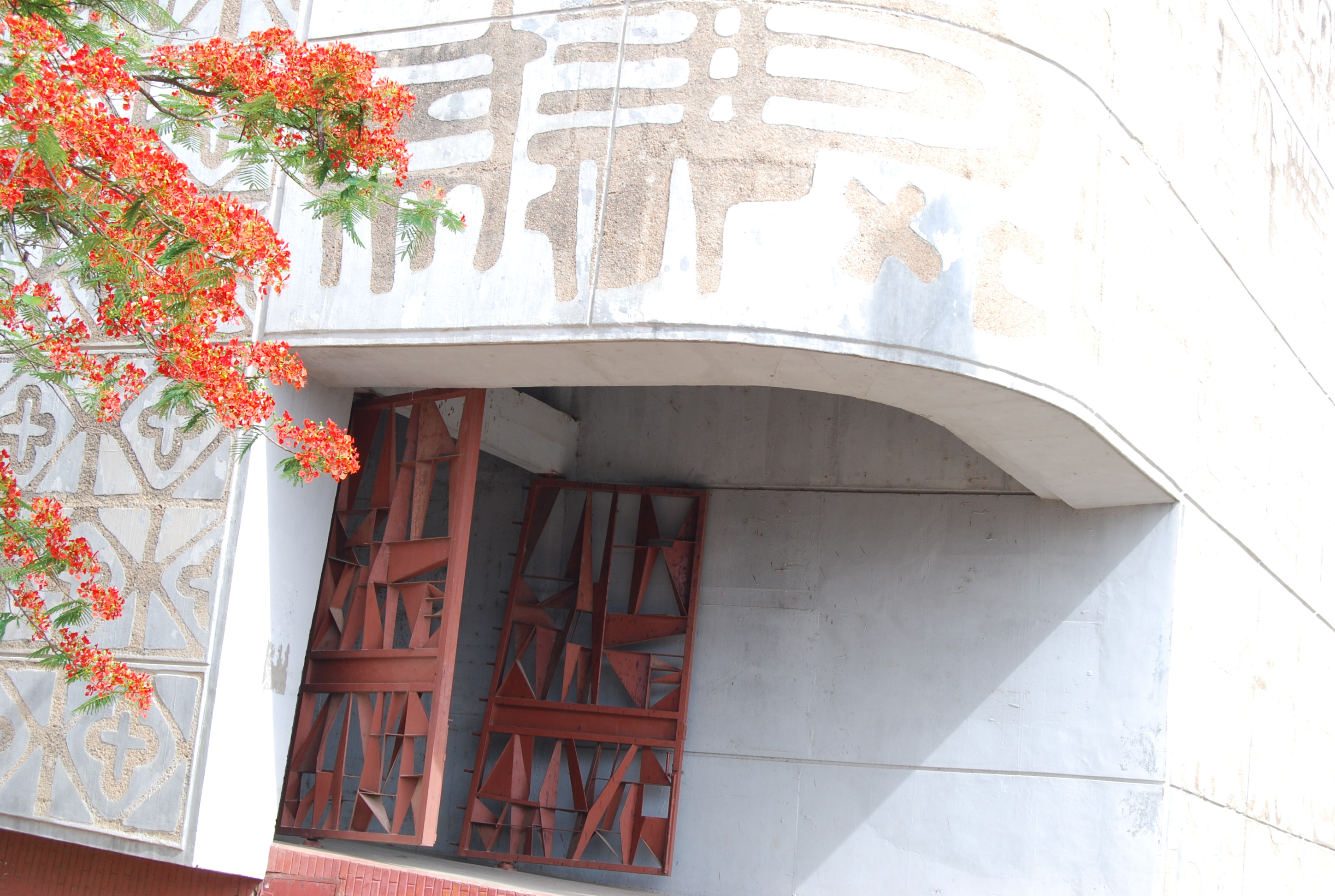
Main door into Sir Abubakar Tafawa Balewa's Tomb

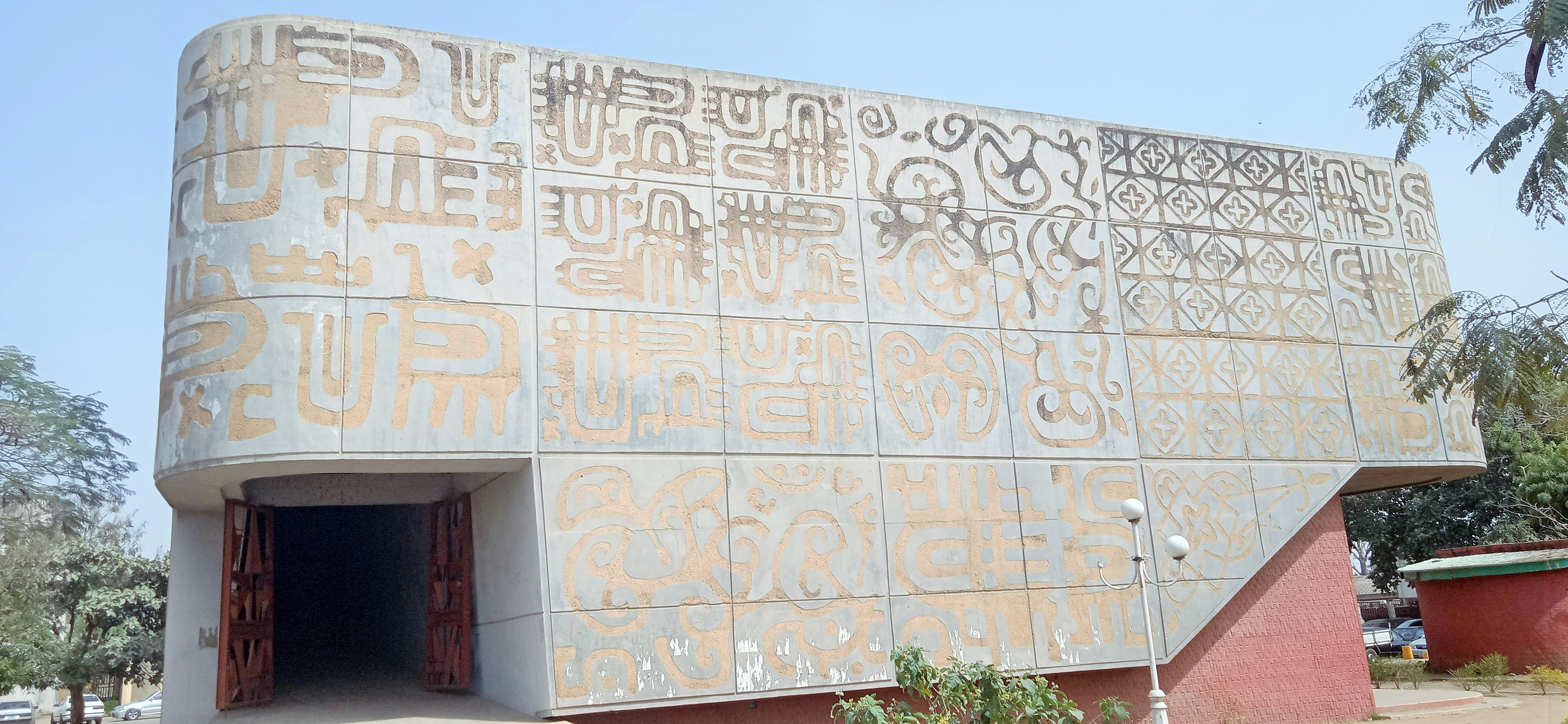
Sir Tafawa Balewa's Tomb

Tafawa Balewa's tomb is the burial place of The Rt. Hon. Sir Abubakar Tafawa Balewa, the only Prime Minister of Nigeria, in Bauchi, Bauchi State, Nigeria.

== History ==
During the 1966 Nigerian coup d'état, Sir Abubakar Tafawa Balewa, the Prime Minister of Nigeria, was kidnapped and his body was found by the roadside six days after the kidnapping. He was then buried in Bauchi where he was born. His tomb was declared as a nationwide monument on August 29, 1979, by the military administrator of the state, Brigadier Garba Duba.

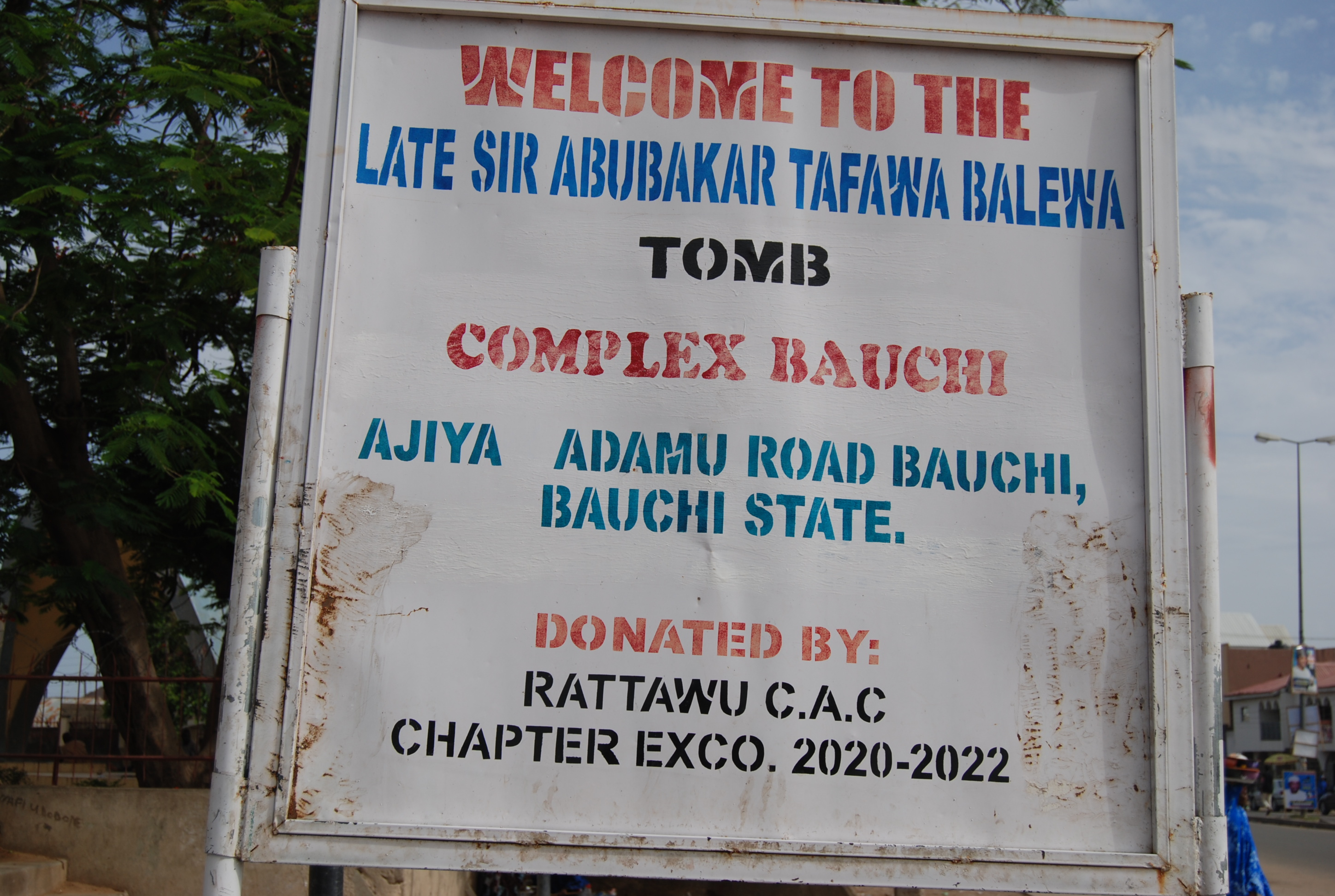
Abubakar Tafawa Balewa's Tomb Signboard

The construction of the monument and the buildings surrounding the tomb began in 1977 and it was authorized in July 1979.

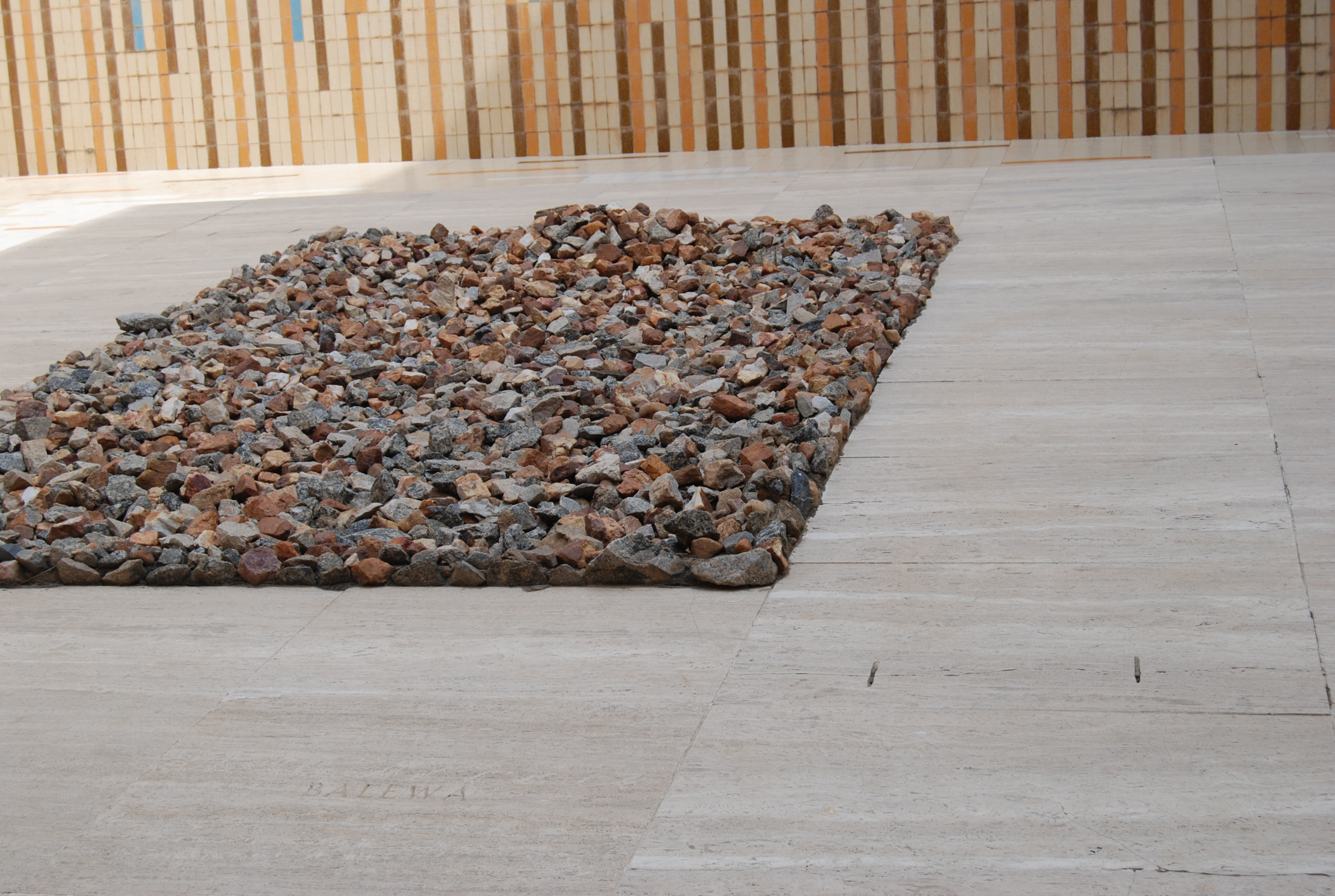
The grave of Sir Abubakar Tafawa Balewa
