= Shaihu Umar =

Shaihu Umar is a 1976 Nigerian film directed by Adamu Halilu. It is based on the eponymous 1955 novella by Abubakar Tafawa Balewa and it is one the first feature film in Hausa. Shaihu Umar was long tagged a lost film until its camera negative was discovered in 2016, thereby making it possible for the film to be digitally reconstructed in 2018.

== Plot ==
The plot is set in northern Nigeria and follows the life of Islamic teacher Shaihu Umar, who narrates his life journey to his students. He narrates how due to the loss of his father, his mother and to remarry and how he was separated from his mother following the banishment of his step-father. Also, he narrates his suffering as a slave and how he got to meet his Koran teacher, Abdulkarim. He also talks about how he got to become an Imam and his search to locate his mother.

== Cast ==
- Umaru Ladan as Shaihu Umar
- Mairiga Aliyu as Fatima
- Husaini Mohammed as Umar, aged 3 years
- Umaru Dembo as Makau
- Assad Yasin as Abdulkarim
- Harira Kachia as Kaka
