= Monarchy of Nigeria =

Monarchy of Nigeria may refer to:

- Nigerian traditional rulers
- Monarchy of Nigeria (1960–1963)
