= Federalism in Nigeria =

Federalism in Nigeria refers to the devolution of self-governance by the West African nation of Nigeria to its federated states, who share sovereignty with the Federal Government.

Federalism in Nigeria can be traced to Sir Frederick Lord Lugard, when the Northern and Southern protectorates were amalgamated in 1914.

== Before and right after independence ==
Federalism is a system of government in which governmental powers that exists in a country are shared between central government and component region. It is also defined as the system of government in which governmental powers are shared between the component units and the central government, i.e. the federal government and its components (state and local government).

Bernard Bourdillon, the Governor-general at that time, initiated and laid the foundation of federalism in Nigeria in 1939 by creating three provinces. He later handed over the constitution to his successor Arthur Richards and it became the Richards Constitution of 1946. At the beginning of formal British indirect rule in 1901, Nigeria was divided into two regions: Northern and Southern, both of which were divided into provinces. From 1901 to 1958, the number of regions was increased to three through both acquisition of territories and partition from existing provinces. However, while native-born chiefs and clerks were appointed to govern the provinces, the regions were governed by the British-appointed colonial authorities. Such regions were made dependent upon the colonial authorities for martial law, manpower and management of resources.

With the approach of independence, power over the regions was given to Nigerian-born citizens, and regional legislatures were established. By the time that Nigeria had declared itself a republic and replaced the post of Governor-General with the post of President, a national bicameral parliament was established and the country was considered a federation of the three regions. The Mid-Western Region was formed from the Western Region in 1966, and Lagos, the capital, was effectively governed as an unofficial fourth region outside the bounds of the Western Region.

== First coup, counter-coup and the new states ==
After the first coup and under the short-lived military government of Aguiyi-Ironsi, Nigeria was reorganized under a central government. Following the counter-coup which resulted in Aguiyi-Ironsi's deposition and assassination, Nigeria was reorganized as a federal country, with three of the regions being divided into newer entities and all first-level subdivisions being renamed as states:

- Eastern Region was divided into East-Central (Enugu), Rivers (Port Harcourt), and South-Eastern (Calabar) states;
- Northern Region was divided into Benue-Plateau (Jos), Kano (Kano), Kwara (Ilorin), North-Central (Kaduna), North-Eastern (Maiduguri), and North-Western (Sokoto) states
- Western Region was divided into Lagos (Lagos) and Western (Ibadan) states.

the states of former Eastern Region made a bid to secede from Nigeria as the states of Biafra and Republic of Benin, resulting in the Nigerian Civil War.

== 1976 ==
In 1976, six years after the end of the civil war, the states were further reorganized:

- Benue-Plateau state divided into Benue (Makurdi) and Plateau states;
- East-Central state divided into Anambra and Imo (Owerri) states;
- Federal Capital Territory (Abuja) formed from parts of Niger and Plateau states;
- North-Eastern state divided into Bauchi (Bauchi), Borno, and Gongola (Yola) states;
- Niger (Minna) state split from Sokoto;
- Western state divided into Ogun (Abeokuta), Ondo (Akure), and Oyo states

State boundaries and names were also reorganized.

== 1987/1989 ==
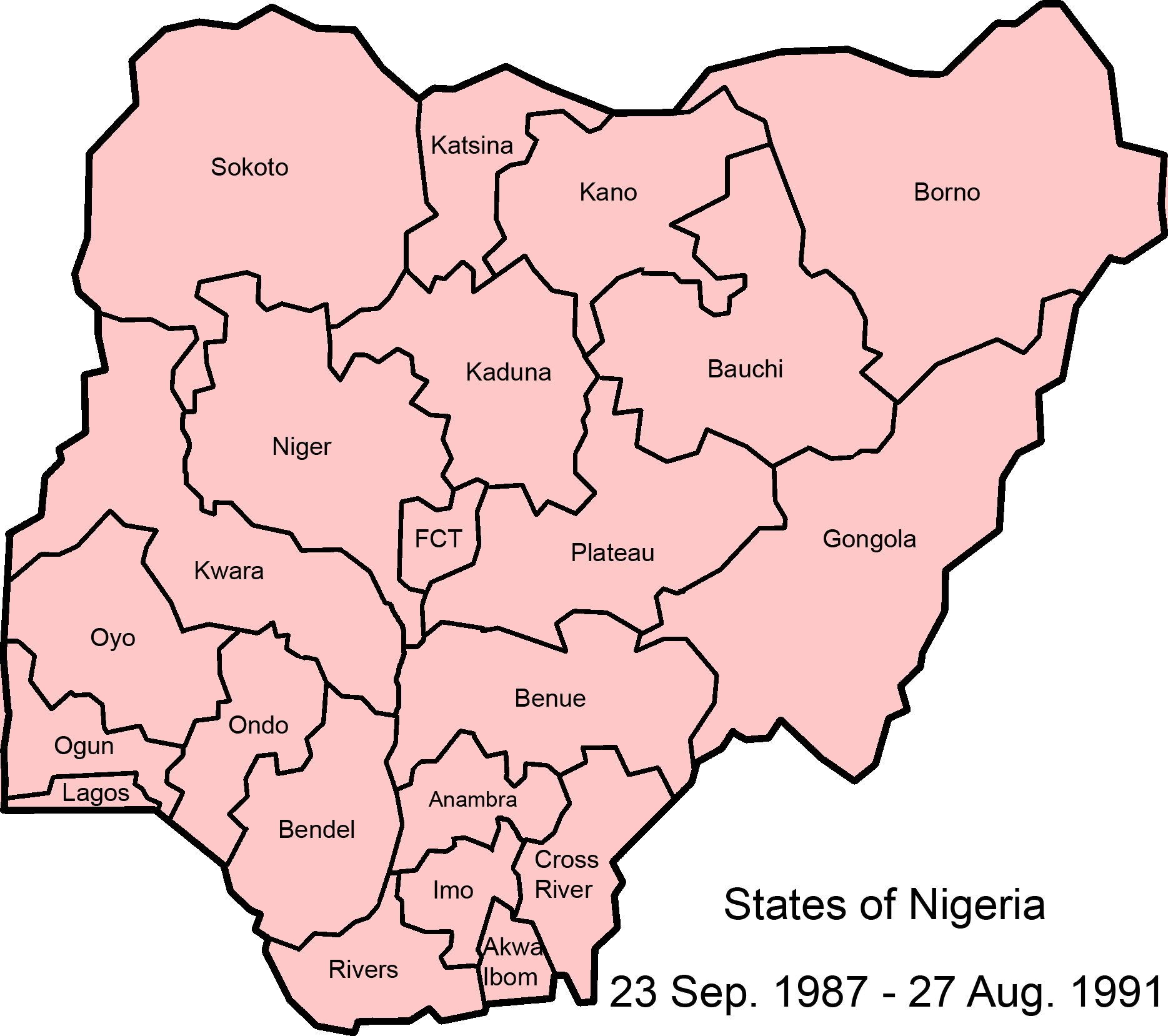
States of Nigeria from 1987-1991

- Akwa Ibom state split from Cross River;
- Katsina state split from Kaduna

== 1991-1996 ==
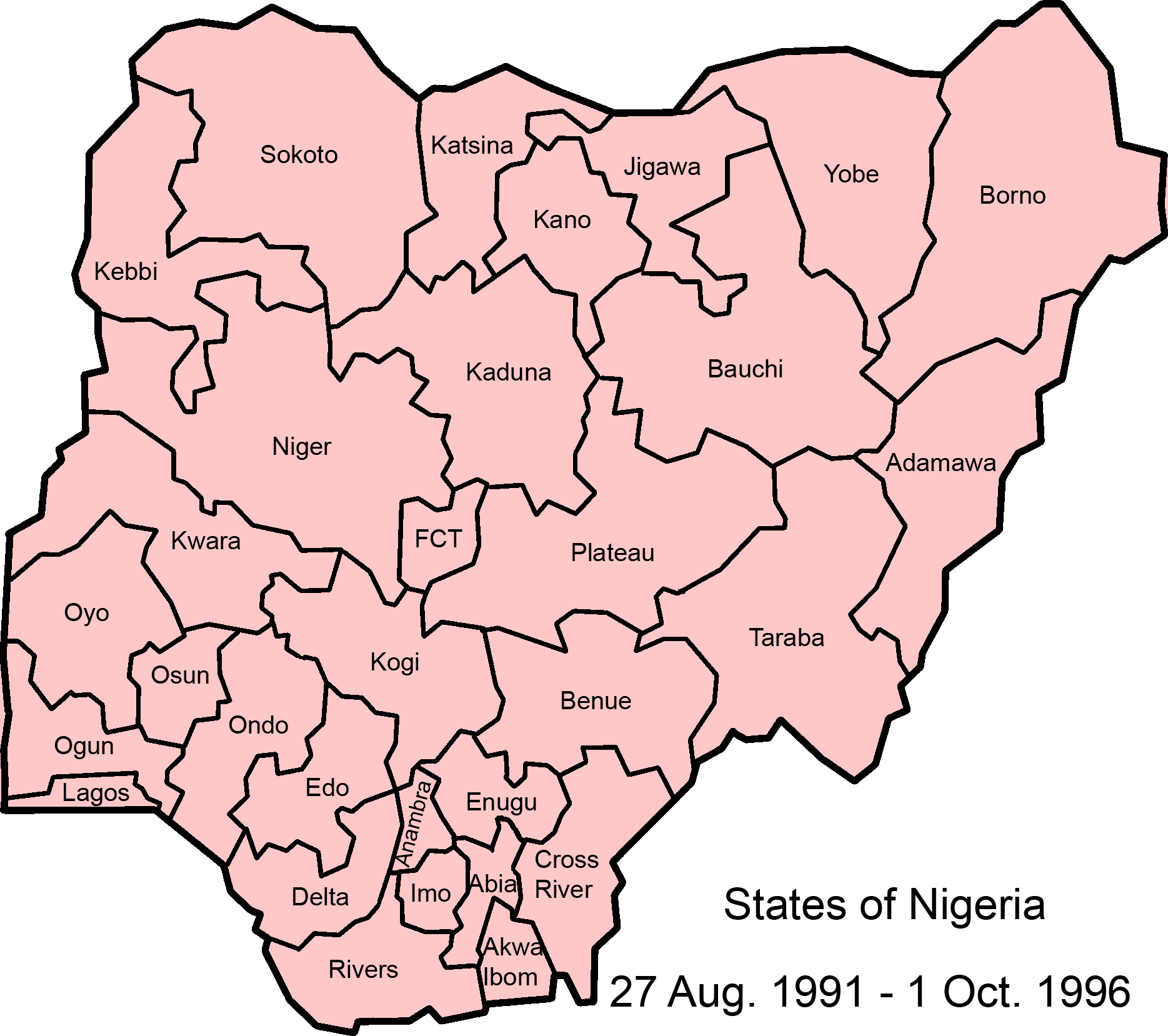
States of Nigeria from 1991-1996

- Abia State split from Imo;
- Bendel State divided into Delta and Edo;
- Enugu State split from Anambra;
- Gongola State divided into Adamawa and Taraba;
- Jigawa State split from Kano;
- Kebbi State split from Sokoto;
- Kogi State formed from parts of Benue and Kwara;
- Osun State split from Oyo;
- Yobe State split from Borno.

== 1996-present ==
- Bayelsa State was split from Rivers;
- Ebonyi State was formed from parts of Abia and Enugu;
- Ekiti State was split from Ondo;
- Gombe State was split from Bauchi;
- Nasarawa State was split from Plateau;
- Zamfara State was split from Sokoto.

== Causes for, and effects of federalism ==
=== Causes for federalism ===
The demand for creating new states in Nigeria often originates from sub-state groups, typically ethnic or tribal-interest groups, which accuse larger state governments of undermining or neglecting the needs and interests of local regions. Additionally, these groups argue that political and economic power in Nigeria remains disproportionately centralised, a structure they claim necessitates further restructuring to address regional disparities.
