= 1967 in Nigeria =

== The Nigerian Civil War ==
In 1967, a Civil war broke out in Nigeria, the war was between the Nigerian troops and Biafran troops. The head of state as at that time was General Yakubu Gowon and the Biafran troop were led by Colonel Chukuemeka Ojukwu. The war lasted for three years, from 6 Jul 1967 to 15 Jan 1970. Gowon had just been chosen as the Head of State after a coup d'état on 29 July 1966, which left the first Military Head of State Major General Johnson Aguiyi-Ironsi assassinated.

There was widespread chaos and tumult, lots of people from Eastern Region of Nigeria predominantly of Igbo descent were targeted and attacked in Northern Nigeria so they fled. Ojukwu reassures the people and encouraged them to go back to their business in other parts of the country.

To mitigate all these occurrences and keep the peace, the federal military government chose delegates to meet with those of the eastern region met at Aburi, a Ghanaian town, where the popular Aburi Accord was signed.

The Decree No. 8, which was passed which was mainly an embodiment of the accord but shortly after that to what seemed like a contradiction, General Gowon announced the creation of 12 states on 27 May 1967, breaking the Eastern State.

This was the major reason for the secession by Ojukwu subsequently a declaration of independence.

A new legal tender was introduced and the old one withdrawn, new Nigerian pound.

== The Creation of States ==
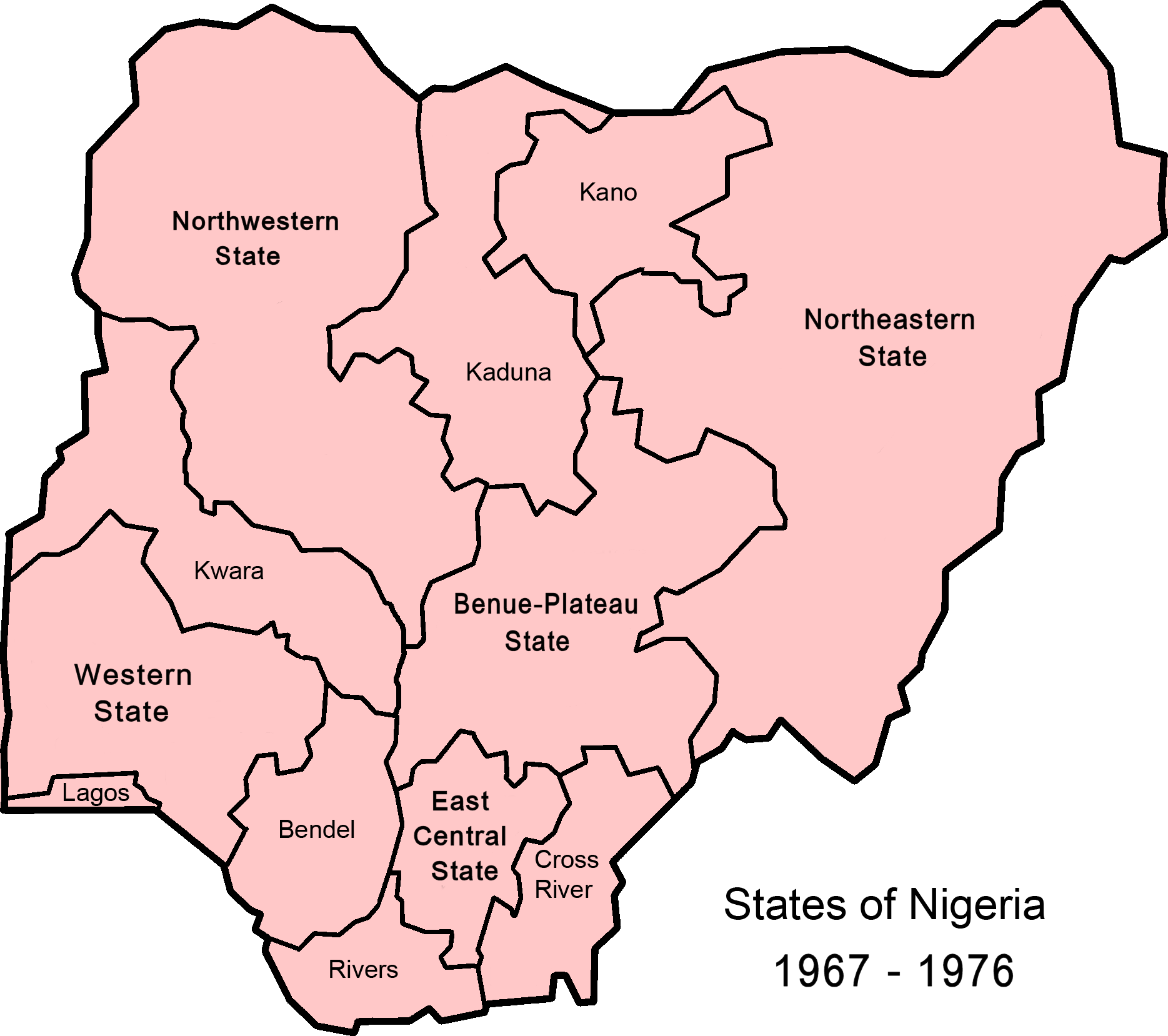
Newly created States in Nigeria

General Yakubu Gowon created twelve states out of the four regions that existed at that time appointing a governor to head them. This move was seen by Col Chukwuemeka Ojukwu as a ploy to weaken the Eastern Region and a breach of the Aburi Accord.

The following were the governors:

- Bendel State: Colonel Samuel Ogbemudia
- Benue-Plateau State: Police Commissioner Joseph Gomwalk
- Cross River State: Colonel Udoakaha Jacob Esuene
- East Central State: Colonel Chukwuemeka Ojukwu
- North Central State: Brigadier Abba Kyari
- Kano State: Colonel Sanni Bello
- Kwara State: Colonel Ibrahim Taiwo
- Lagos State: Colonel Mobolaji Olufunso Johnson
- Northeastern State: Colonel Musa Usman
- Northwestern State: Police Commissioner Usman Faruk
- Rivers State: Lieutenant Commander Papayere Diette-Spiff
- Western State: Colonel Robert Adeyinka Adebayo

== The Nigerian Defence Academy ==
The Nigerian Defence Academy graduated their first set which included graduating cadets of the NDA Regular 1 Course in March 1967.

== Members of the Supreme Military Council ==
NAF (Kurubo) Ejoor (COS Army), Wey (COS SHQ), GOWON, Kam Saleem (IG), Soroh (Navy), Rotimi (West), GbamiboyeCW/Kwara), Asika (EC).

== Incumbents ==
=== Federal government ===
- Head of State: Yakubu Gowon
- Deputy Head of State: Joseph Edet Akinwale Wey
- Commissioner of Defence: Yakubu Gowon
- Chief of Army Staff: Joseph Akahan
- Chief Justice: Sir Adetokunbo Ademola

== Events ==
- 6 July - 14 July - Battle of Nsukka, the first military conflict during the Nigerian Civil War.
- 19 September - Republic of Benin established
- 20 September - Republic of Benin disestablished
- 7 October - Asaba massacre took place when federal troops of Nigeria entered Asaba, rounded up as many as 500 Igbo men of Asaba and shot them.
- 17 October - Start of Operation Tiger Claw

== Births ==
- 15 January - Aliyu Sani Madaki, politician
- 27 April - Iyabo Obasanjo-Bello, politician
- 8 September - Yvonne Losos de Muñiz, dressage rider
- 16 October - Ike Shorunmu, footballer
- date unknown - Helon Habila, novelist and poet

== Deaths ==
- September - Christopher Okigbo, poet, 37, killed during Nigerian Civil War
