= Stafford Foster-Sutton =

British jurist

Sir Stafford William Powell Foster-Sutton (24 December 1897 – 6 November 1991) was a British judge, who served as Chief Justice of Nigeria from 1955 to 1958. Before that, he served as the Attorney General of the Federation of Malaya from 1948 to 1950.
