= 1977 in Nigeria =

- Decades: 1950s; 1960s; 1970s; 1980s; 1990s
- See also: Other events of 1977; Timeline of Nigerian history

The following is a list of events in 1977 in Nigeria.

== Incumbents ==
- Head of State: Olusegun Obasanjo
- Deputy Head of State: Shehu Musa Yar'Adua
- Commissioner of Defence: Olusegun Obasanjo
- Chief of Army Staff: Theophilus Yakubu Danjuma
- Chief Justice: Darnley Arthur Alexander

== Events ==
- 15 January–12 February – FESTAC 77 held in Lagos.
- 18 February – Kalakuta Republic, a communal compound founded by political activist Fela Kuti is destroyed by armed soldiers.
- August – West African Games held in Lagos.
- Nigerian Academy of Science is established.

== Births ==
- 16 October – Lucy Ejike, Paralympic powerlifter
- 15 September – Chimamanda Ngozi Adichie, author
