= There Was a Country =

2012 non-fiction book by Chinua Achebe

- Author: Chinua Achebe
- Language: English
- Genre: Non-fiction
- Publisher: Allen Lane
- Publication date: October 2012
- Publication place: United Kingdom

There Was a Country: A Personal History of Biafra is a personal account by Nigerian writer Chinua Achebe of the Nigerian Civil War, also known as the Biafran War. It is considered one of the defining works of modern African non-fiction. Released in October 2012, six months prior to Achebe's death, it is the author's last published book.
