= 1993 in Nigeria =

This article is about the particular significance of the year 1993 to Nigeria and its people.

== Incumbents ==
=== Federal government ===
- Head of State:
  - Until 26 August: Ibrahim Babangida
  - 26 August–17 November: Ernest Shonekan
  - Starting 17 November: Sani Abacha
- Chief of General Staff:
  - Until 26 August: Augustus Aikhomu
  - 26 August–17 November: vacant
  - Starting 17 November: Oladipo Diya
- Chief of Defence Staff: Sani Abacha (Until 17 November); Oladipo Diya (Starting 17 November)
- Chief Justice: Mohammed Bello

=== Governors ===
- Adamawa State: Abubakar Saleh Michika (until 17 November)
- Akwa Ibom State: Akpan Isemin (until 18 November)
- Anambra State: Chukwuemeka Ezeife (until 17 November)
- Bendel State: Dahiru Mohammed (until November)
- Benue State: Moses Adasu (until November)
- Borno State: Maina Maaji Lawan (until November)
- Cross River State: Clement Ebri (until November)
- Delta State: Felix Ibru (until 17 November)
- Edo State: John Odigie Oyegun (until November)
- Gongola State: Okwesilieze Nwodo (until November)
- Imo State: Evan Enwerem (until November)
- Jigawa State: Ali Sa'ad Birnin-Kudu (until November)
- Kaduna State: Mohammed Dabo Lere (until 17 November)
- Kano State: Kabiru Ibrahim Gaya (until November)
- Katsina State: Saidu Barda (until November)
- Kebbi State: Abubakar Musa (until November)
- Kogi State: Abubakar Audu (until November)
- Kwara State: Shaaba Lafiaji (until November)
- Lagos State: Michael Otedola (until 17 November)
- Niger State: Musa Inuwa (until November)
- Ogun State: Olusegun Osoba (until November)
- Osun State: Isiaka Adeleke (until 17 November)
- Oyo State: Kolapo Olawuyi Ishola (until 17 November)
- Taraba State: Jolly Nyame (until 17 November)
- Yobe State: Bukar Ibrahim (until 17 November)

== Events ==
- June 12, 1993 — MKO Abiola wins the presidential election; President Ibrahim Babangida annuls the election.
- August 26, 1993 — President Ibrahim Babangida steps down due to pressure from the Armed Forces Ruling Council. Ernest Shonekan assumes the reins of power as the Interim Head of State.
- November 17, 1993 — Ernest Shonekan is forced to resign from office. Defence Minister, Sani Abacha becomes Head of State, and establishes the Provisional Ruling Council of Nigeria.

== Births ==
- January 1 – Michael Olaitan, footballer
- May 1 – Ifeoma Nwoye, wrestler
- December 10 - Odunayo Adekuoroye, wrestler
