= Saidu Samaila Sambawa =

Nigerian politician

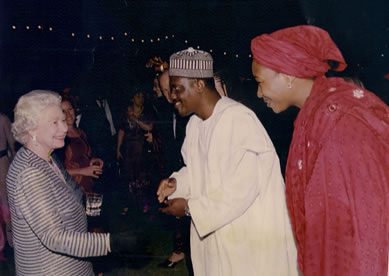
Sambawa (centre) with his wife (right) and Elizabeth II (left), 2003

Saidu Samaila Sambawa is a Nigerian politician. As a member of the Peoples Democratic Party, he headed the Federal Ministry of Sports and Social Development until the June 2006 cabinet reshuffle, when he was replaced by Bala Bawa Ka'oje.
