= 1994 in Nigeria =

This article is about the particular significance of the year 1994 to Nigeria and its people.

== Incumbents ==
=== Federal government ===
- Head of State: Sani Abacha
- Chief of General Staff: Oladipo Diya
- Chief of Defence Staff: Oladipo Diya
- Chief Justice: Mohammed Bello

== Events ==
- 3 / 4 June – The Democratic Alternative, a Nigerian opposition political party, is established in Benin City by about 200 Nigerians critical of the military politicians
- 19 December – Nigeria Airways Flight 9805 crashes in marshland near Kiri Kasama
- Crown F.C. football club established
- Spotlight F.C. football club established

== Births ==
- 14 February – Hannah Rueben, wrestler
- 4 June – Aaron Samuel Olanare, footballer
- 18 August – Bukola Abogunloko, sprinter who competed in the 2012 Summer Olympics

== Deaths ==
- 27 June – Tai Solarin, educator and author who established the Mayflower School in Ikenne (born 1922)
