= Western Region of Nigeria =

Region of Nigeria

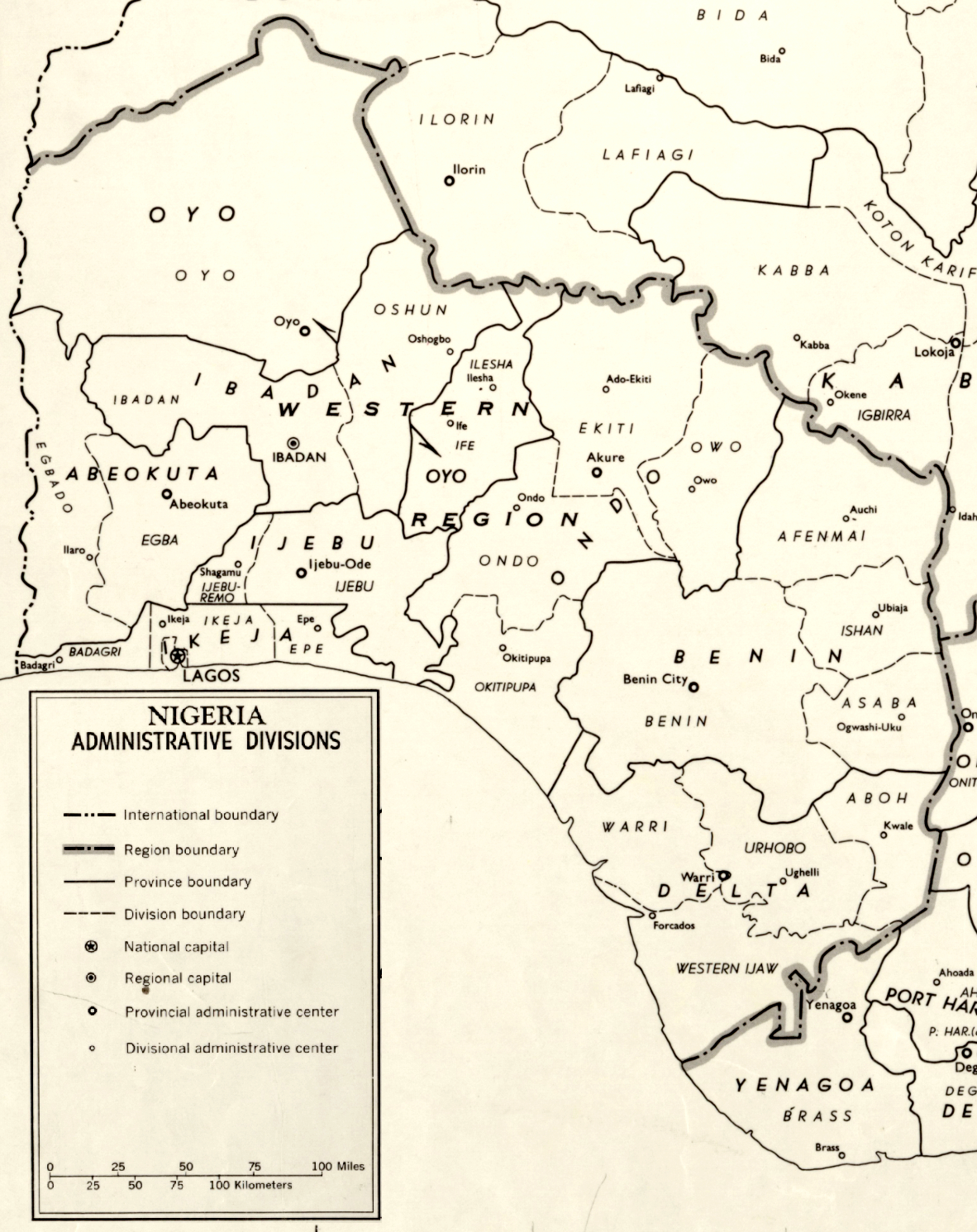
Map of the Western Region of Nigeria and its internal Provincial and Divisional boundaries

The Western Region of Nigeria was established as one of three regions united in the Federation of Nigeria as laid out in the Lyttleton constitution adopted in 1954. On creation, it was the second largest and least ethnically diverse (most homogeneous) of Nigeria's three regions, with an overwhelming Yoruba ethnic majority of around 75%. It had eight provinces, two of which were mostly occupied by ethnic minorities. Its capital was in the city of Ibadan.

On August 9, 1963, the ethnic minorities of the Western region comprising around some 20% of the regional population resident in the Benin and Warri Provinces were all-together carved out to create the new Mid-Western Region with its capital at Benin City, leaving the successor "New Western" region nearly ethnically homogeneous at over 95% Yoruba even with the immigrant non native groups in its various urban clusters taken into account. According to the national census of 1963, the 'New West' had a population of 10,265,846 people, while the Mid-West had a population of 2,535,839 people.

Four years later, on 27 May 1967, the "New Western region" was subdivided into Western State and Lagos State.

== Subdivisions ==
The Western Region of Nigeria was divided into provinces which were further subdivided into divisions. Before 1963, the eight provinces of the region and their divisions were as follows:

- Abeokuta Province
  - Egba Division
  - Egbado Division

- Benin Province
  - Asaba Division
  - Benin Division
  - Ishan Division
  - Kukuruku (Afenmai) Division

- Ikeja (Colony) Province
  - Badagry Division
  - Epe Division
  - Ikeja Division
  - Ikorodu Division

- Ibadan Province
  - Ibadan Division
  - Ibarapa Division

- Ijebu Province
  - Ijebu-Ode Division
  - Ijebu-Remo Division

- Ondo Province
  - Ekiti Division
  - Okitipupa Division
  - Ondo Division
  - Owo Division

- Oyo Province
  - Oyo Division
  - Ife–Ilesha Division

- Warri (Delta) Province
  - Aboh Division
  - Warri Division
  - Urhobo Division
  - Western Ijaw Division

Among the provinces, the Ibadan province was the most populous and densely populated, followed by the Ondo and Benin provinces respectively. In terms of land area, the Oyo province was the largest, followed by the Ondo and Benin provinces. However, among the divisions, Ibadan was the most populated, followed by the Ekiti division and the Ife–Ilesha division.

The original (older) Western region now consists in full or in part, of ten states of Nigeria, across two geopolitical zones, namely: Bayelsa; (Ekeremor and Sagbama LGAs), Delta, Edo, Ekiti, Lagos, Ogun, Ondo, Osun, Oyo, as well as the Ndoni district of Rivers state, which was a part of the Aboh division.

Chief Obafemi Awolowo was leader of the Action Group and served as Premier of the Western Region from 1954 to 1959.
