= Monarchy of Nigeria (1960–1963) =

Head of state of Nigeria from 1960 to 1963

Queen of Nigeria
- Federal
- Coat of arms of Nigeria

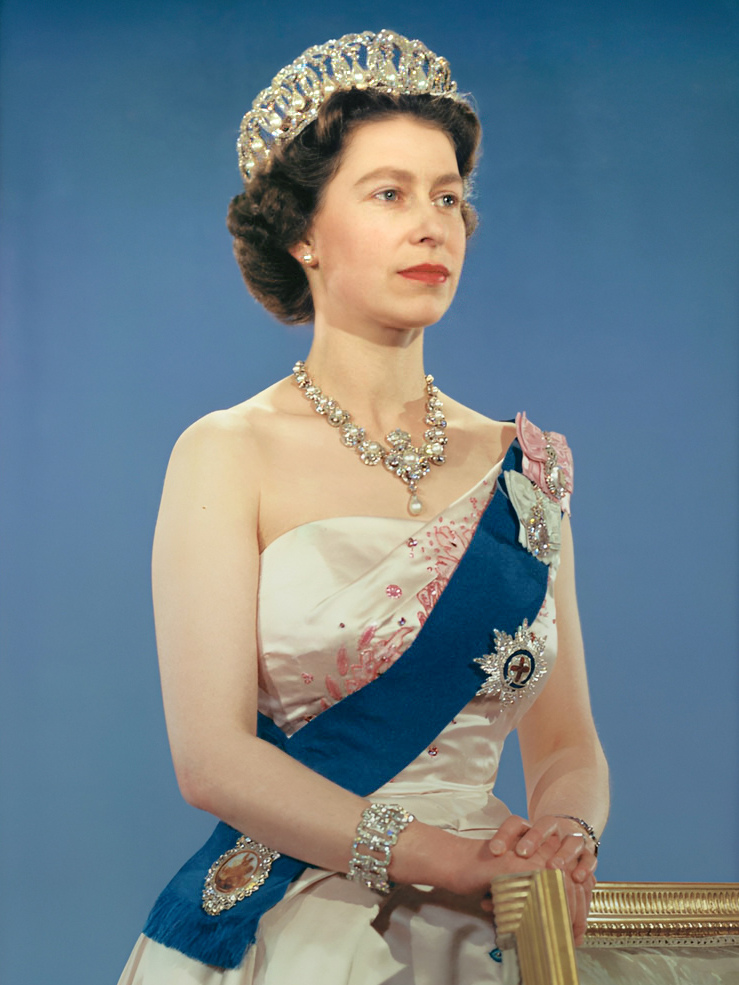
- Queen Elizabeth II

Details
- Style: Her Majesty
- Formed: 1 October 1960
- Abolished: 1 October 1963

From 1960 to 1963, Nigeria was a sovereign state and an independent constitutional monarchy. Nigeria shared the monarch with Australia, Canada, United Kingdom, and certain other sovereign states. The monarch's constitutional roles were mostly delegated to the governor-general of Nigeria.

Elizabeth II was the only monarch to reign during this period. As such, she was officially titled Queen of Nigeria.

The monarchy was abolished on 1 October 1963, when Nigeria adopted a president as its head of state.

== History ==
External videos
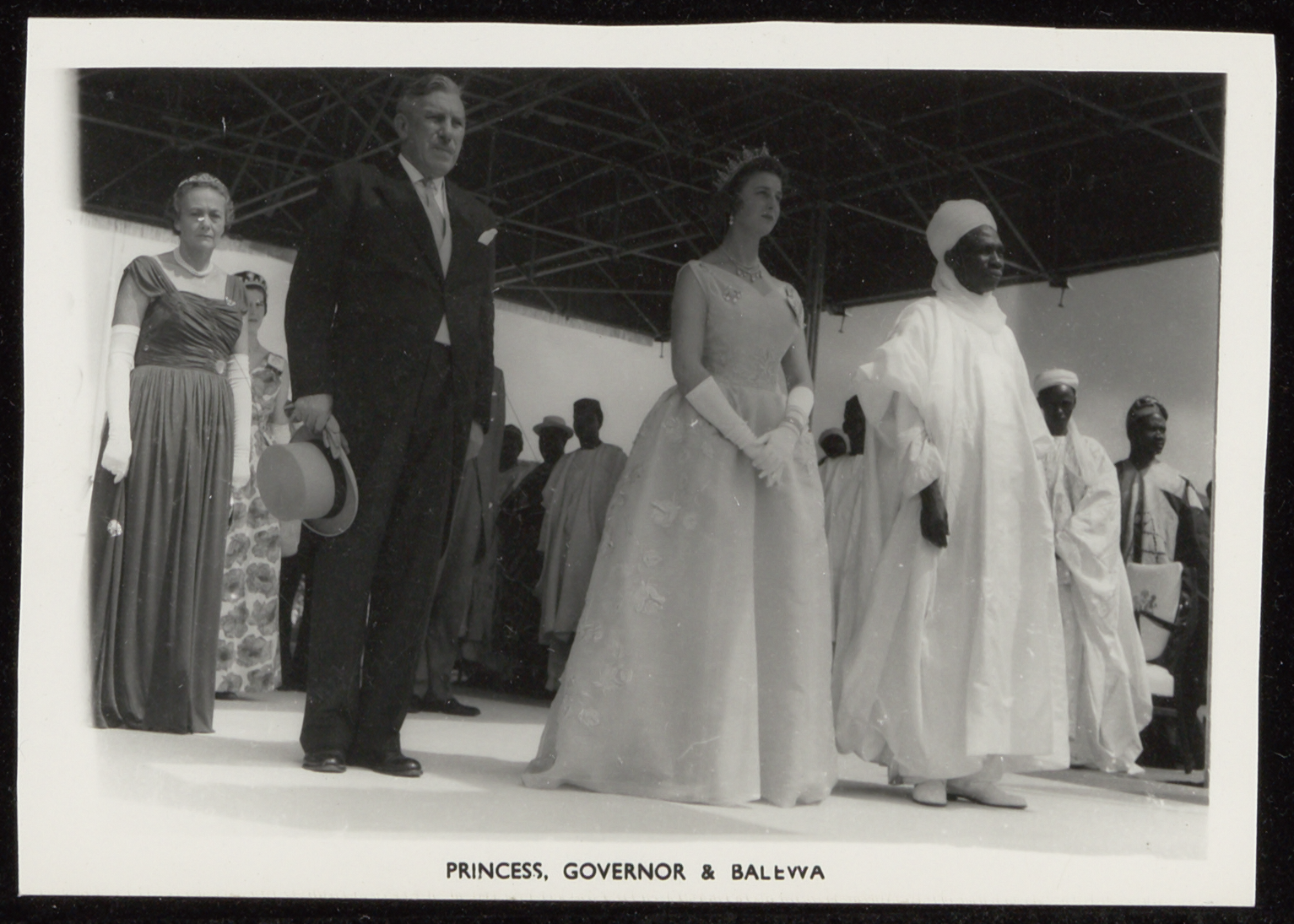
- Princess Alexandra representing the Queen at the independence celebrations at Lagos, 1 October 1960
- Princess Alexandra Declares Nigeria Independent (1960) Source: British Pathé.

The Federation of Nigeria had superseded the Colony and Protectorate of Nigeria within the British Empire on 1 October 1954. The Federation was initially a quasi-federal British colony. It became independent as a dominion within the Commonwealth of Nations on 1 October 1960 under the Parliament of the United Kingdom's Nigeria Independence Act 1960.

I have indeed every confidence that, based on the happy experience of a successful partnership, our future relations with the United Kingdom will be more cordial than ever, bound together as we shall be in the Commonwealth by a common allegiance to Her Majesty Queen Elizabeth whom today we proudly acclaim as Queen of Nigeria and Head of the Commonwealth.

— Prime Minister Sir Abubakar Tafawa Balewa on Independence Day 1960

Princess Alexandra of Kent represented the Queen at the independence celebrations. She flew to Lagos on 26 September 1960, and was welcomed in Nigeria by a crowd of tens of thousands of people. On 1 October, the Princess presented Nigeria's instrument of independence, also known as the Freedom Charter, to Sir Abubakar Tafawa Balewa who became the Prime Minister. On 3 October, the Princess formally opened the first federal parliament of independent Nigeria, on behalf of the Queen, before an assembly of people and diplomats. Dr Nnamdi Azikiwe, President of the Nigerian senate and Governor-General-designate, addressed the Princess, asking her to open Parliament by reading the Speech from the Throne. The Princess later took a state drive through Lagos, saying an official farewell to Nigerians.

The Queen sent a message to Nigerians, which said:

My husband and I return the happiest of memories of our visit to Nigeria, and our thoughts are with you on this memorable day. As you assume the heavy responsibility of independence, I send my good wish for a great and noble future. It is with special pleasure that I welcome you to our Commonwealth family of Nations. ... May God bless and guide your country through the years to come.

== Constitutional role ==
Nigerian state leaders (1960–1963)
Monarch	Elizabeth II
Governor-General	Sir James Wilson Robertson (1960)
Governor-General	Nnamdi Azikiwe (1960–1963)
Prime Minister	Sir Abubakar Tafawa Balewa
See List of heads of state of Nigeria for details of heads of state after 1963

Nigeria was one of the realms of the Commonwealth of Nations that shared the same person as Sovereign and head of state.

Effective with the Nigeria Independence Act 1960, no British government minister could advise the Sovereign on any matters pertaining to Nigeria, meaning that on all matters of Nigeria, the monarch was advised solely by Nigerian ministers. All Nigerian bills required Royal Assent. The monarch was represented in the Federation by the Governor-General of Nigeria, who was appointed by the monarch on the advice of the Nigerian Prime Minister. After independence, the monarch held her sovereignty in virtue of her "Nigerian Crown", and acted on the advice of the Nigerian Government.

=== Executive and legislature ===
The Government of Nigeria was officially known as Her Majesty's Government.

The monarch, the Senate, and the House of Representatives constituted the Parliament of Nigeria. All executive powers of Nigeria rested with the sovereign. All laws in Nigeria were enacted only with the granting of Royal Assent, done by the Governor-General on behalf of the Sovereign. The Governor-General could reserve a bill "for the Queen's pleasure"; that is withhold his consent to the bill and present it to the sovereign for her personal decision; or he could veto it completely by withholding his assent therefrom. The Governor-General was also responsible for summoning, proroguing, and dissolving Parliament. The Governor-General had the power to choose and appoint the Council of Ministers and could dismiss them under his discretion. All Nigerian ministers held office at the pleasure of the Governor-General.

=== Foreign affairs ===
The Royal Prerogative also extended to foreign affairs: the sovereign or the governor-general conducted treaties, alliances and international agreements on the advice of the Nigerian Cabinet. Nigerian representatives abroad were accredited to foreign countries by the monarch in her capacity as Queen of Nigeria. The governor-general, on behalf of the Queen, also appointed Nigerian high commissioners, ambassadors, and similar principal representatives, and received similar diplomats from foreign states. The letters of credence were formally issued by the monarch.

=== Courts ===
Within the Commonwealth realms, the sovereign is responsible for rendering justice for all her subjects, and is thus traditionally deemed the fount of justice. In Nigeria, criminal offences were legally deemed to be offences against the sovereign and proceedings for indictable offences were brought in the sovereign's name in the form of The Queen versus [Name]. Hence, the common law held that the sovereign "can do no wrong"; the monarch cannot be prosecuted in her own courts for criminal offences. The highest court of appeal for Nigeria was the Judicial Committee of the Privy Council, and criminal prosecution was instituted in the monarch's name. The monarch, and by extension the governor-general, could also grant immunity from prosecution, exercise the royal prerogative of mercy, and pardon offences against the Crown, either before, during, or after a trial.

== Federal and provincial aspects ==
Nigeria's monarchy was federal, with four legal jurisdictions—one federal and three provincial—with the monarch taking on a distinct legal persona in each.

The Queen of Nigeria was represented by the Governor-General at the federal level, and by governors in the three regions: Northern, Western, and Eastern. The governors and the Governor-General were appointed by the monarch on the recommendation of the Nigerian Premiers and the Nigerian Prime Minister respectively.

== Royal style and titles ==
The Royal Style and Titles Act, 1961 of the Nigerian Parliament granted the monarch separate style and titles in her role as Queen of Nigeria.

Elizabeth II had the following style and titles in her role as the monarch of Nigeria:

- 1 October 1960 – 1 June 1961: Elizabeth the Second, by the Grace of God, of the United Kingdom of Great Britain and Northern Ireland and of Her other Realms and Territories Queen, Head of the Commonwealth, Defender of the Faith
- 1 June 1961 – 1 October 1963: Elizabeth the Second, Queen of Nigeria and of Her other Realms and Territories, Head of the Commonwealth
  - Colloquially, the Queen was referred to as Oba Obirin (Yoruba: King Lady) by the people of Yorubaland during her reign.

== Oath of allegiance ==
In Nigeria, the oath of allegiance required a person to swear or affirm that he would be "faithful and bear true allegiance to Her Majesty Queen Elizabeth the Second, Her Heirs and Successors, according to law", while for the oath of office he had to swear that he would "well and truly serve Her Majesty Queen Elizabeth the Second in the Office of _______".

== Cultural role ==
The flag of the Governor-General of Nigeria, featuring St Edward's Crown

=== The Crown and Honours ===
Within the Commonwealth realms, the monarch is deemed the fount of honour. Similarly, the monarch, as Sovereign of Nigeria, conferred awards and honours in Nigeria in her name. Most of them were awarded on the advice of "Her Majesty's Nigerian Ministers".

=== The Crown and the Defence Force ===
The monarch was the commander-in-chief of the Nigerian Armed Forces.

The Crown sat at the pinnacle of the Nigerian Defence Force. It was reflected in Nigeria's naval vessels, which bore the prefix HMNS, i.e., Her Majesty's Nigerian Ship. The Nigerian Army and the Nigerian Navy were known as the "Royal Nigerian Army", and the "Royal Nigerian Navy" respectively. The prefix "Royal" was dropped when the monarchy was abolished.

== Abolition ==
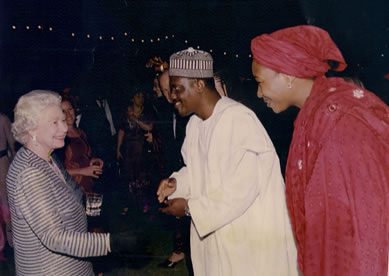
Queen Elizabeth II (left) with Saidu Samaila Sambawa in Nigeria, 2003

The monarchy was unpopular with Nigerians and all political parties in Nigeria agreed that the country should be a republic; as the British High Commissioner to the Federation, Lord Head, noted:

It is almost old-fashioned to have a Governor-General. The trend in Asia and Africa has been towards Republican constitutions and many Nigerians feel that they must inevitably follow the trend. The Crown is not thought of as part of Nigeria's life but almost as a last remaining relic of colonial rule.

Nigeria adopted the president of Nigeria as head of state, on 1 October 1963, when the Federation of Nigeria became the Federal Republic of Nigeria, a republic within the Commonwealth of Nations.

The Queen sent a message to the new President Azikiwe, which said:

As Nigeria becomes a republic, I send you, Mr. President, and to all the people of Nigeria my sincere good wishes for success and prosperity. During the past years I have shared in the hopes and aspirations of your great nation. I have the happy memories of the warmth and splendour of your hospitality and the many friends I made when I visited Nigeria. I am sure that in the future the common memories of our long association will strengthen and increase the friendship of our countries as fellow members of the Commonwealth. I wish you all good fortune in the years to come, and pray for your country's successful achievement of the great tasks you have undertaken.

Queen Elizabeth II visited Nigeria twice: 28 January–16 February 1956 and 3–6 December 2003, the latter time to attend the Commonwealth Heads of Government Meeting 2003.

== See also ==
- Statue of Queen Elizabeth II, Lagos
