= Adetokunbo Ademola =

Chief Justice of Nigeria from 1958 to 1972

The Right Honourable Omoba Sir Adetokunbo Ademola GCON KBE PC SAN
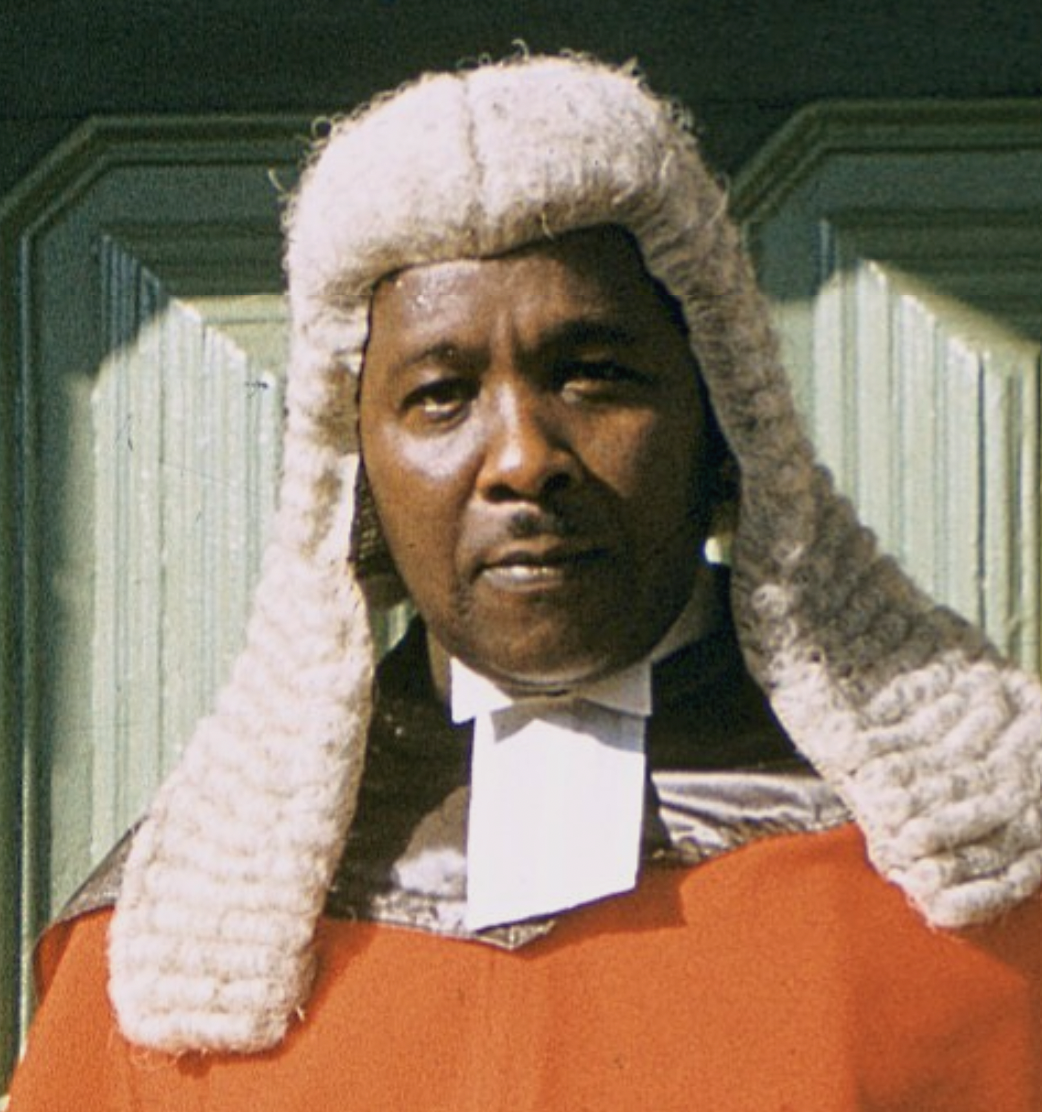
- Taken in 1959

Chief Justice of Nigeria
- In office 1958–1972
- Preceded by: Sir Stafford Foster-Sutton
- Succeeded by: Taslim Olawale Elias

Personal details
- Born: Adetokunbo Adegboyega Ademola; 1 February 1906
- Died: 29 January 1993 (aged 86)
- Spouse: Kofo Moore
- Relations: Allwell Ademola (granddaughter)
- Children: 5
- Parent: Ladapo Ademola (father)

Omoba Sir Adetokunbo Adegboyega Ademola GCON KBE PC SAN (1 February 1906 – 29 January 1993) was a Nigerian jurist who was the Chief Justice of Nigeria from 1958 to 1972. He was appointed as Chief Justice on 1 April 1958, succeeding Sir Stafford Foster-Sutton, who was retiring. Ademola was a son of Oba Sir Ladapo Ademola II, the Alake of the Egba clan of Nigeria. He was the first chancellor of the University of Benin.

== Early life and education ==
Adetokunbo was born on 1 February 1906, into royalty as the son of Prince Ladapo and Princess Tejumade Ademola. His father was a regent of the Egba United Government in Lagos who later became Ademola II, the Alake of Egbaland, Abeokuta, a historic walled city of the Egbas in south-western Nigeria. His mother was a senior sister to Sir Adeyemo Alakija. At the age of four, he lived briefly with his maternal grandfather, Pa Alakija, in Abeokuta, and a year later he started his primary education at the Roman Catholic School in Itesi, Abeokuta. He moved back to Lagos when he was eight to live with his mother in the family compound on Broad St, and subsequently continued his education at Holy Cross School, Lagos. He attended St Gregory's Grammar School, Obalende and King's College Lagos for his secondary school education.

He finished his secondary education in 1925 and passed the Senior Clerical Examination for admission into the colonial Civil Service. He gained appointment as a clerk in the Chief Secretary's office of the National Secretariat, Lagos. From 1928 to 1931, Ademola studied law at Selwyn College, University of Cambridge. From 1958 to 1972, he served as Chief Justice.

== Career ==
Adetokunbo was called to the bar at the Middle Temple in London in 1934. After returning to Nigeria and at the insistence of his father, he joined the Civil Service and from 1934–35, he worked as crown counsel in the Office of the Attorney-General. He then joined the unified Nigerian administrative service and for a year, he was posted to Enugu as assistant secretary at the southern secretariat, Eastern Nigeria. He left the service and started a private practice from 1936 until 1939, when he was appointed Magistrate of the Protectorate Court. In 1938, he joined the Nigerian Youth Movement. As a magistrate, he was posted to various Nigerian towns; Ademola worked in Warri from 1939-1946, and then returned to Lagos in 1946 to preside at St Anna Court. In 1947, he was posted to Opobo. In 1949, he became the third Nigerian to be appointed a puisne judge. In 1948, he served as a member of the commission for the revision of court legislation.

In 1955, a year before Western Nigeria became internally self-governing, Sir Adetokunbo was appointed Chief Justice for Western Nigeria, thus becoming the first Nigerian head of the judiciary anywhere in the country. His string of 'firsts' continued when, three years later, he became the first Nigerian Chief Justice of the entire Federation of Nigeria.

As Chief Justice, he played the role of peacemaker in two political events in the country. In 1964, after the stalemate of national elections, Nnamdi Azikiwe, the president, refused to call any party to form a government until the intervention of Sir Louis Mbanefo, the Chief Justice of the Eastern region and Ademola. He later went on to play a calming role in the aftermath of the 1966 coup when some northern officers wanted to secede from the country.

As Chief Justice, Ademola was involved in some notable judgements during his tenure, in both Regina vs Ilorin Native Authority and Ayinke vs Ibidunni, he delved into the issue of customary law. He was also involved in various constitutional cases during the period. Some of the cases are Doherty v Abubakar Balewa, Adesoji Aderemi v Samuel Akintola and Olawoyin vs the Commissioner of Police. Sir Adetokunbo, along with Dr. Teslim Olawale Elias (who succeeded him as Chief Justice of Nigeria), was instrumental in the establishment of the Nigerian Law School. Prior to its establishment, legal practitioners had had to qualify at the English Bar.

During Ademola's tenure, the federal government changed from colonial rule to a parliamentary system, then to military rule. Ademola as head of the judiciary was not found wanting as a man respected by his peers and who was able to compromise and accord respect for the judicial branch of government. However, some critics perceived he was lenient towards the executive branch. Ademola preferred a unified judiciary. Even though he was once a regional Chief Justice, it did not deter his preference for a unified structure.

=== Census board ===
After his retirement from the judiciary, Ademola was appointed chairman of the newly created Nigerian Census Board, a predecessor to the current National Population Commission. The board conducted a national census in 1973 and at the end of the exercise a total provisional figure of 79 million was reported. The figure was rejected by most Southern states who were not happy that the proportion of people resident in the North had a much higher increase from the previous census that those living in the south.

=== Knighthood, honours and memberships ===
Ademola was a prince of the Yoruba people, and thus often made use of the pre-nominal honorific Omoba.

He was first knighted in January 1957, and then in 1963 was appointed a member of the Privy Council of the United Kingdom (PC) as well as a Knight Commander of the Order of the British Empire (KBE), all by Queen Elizabeth II during the time Nigeria was a British protectorate and later a Commonwealth realm. By serving as Chief Justice of Nigeria, Adetokunbo was awarded the rank of a Grand Commander of the Order of the Niger (GCON) by the federal government of the Republic of Nigeria.

Adetokunbo was also a member of the United Nations International Public Service Advisory Board, member of the International commission of Jurists, executive member of World peace through Law, vice president of the World Association of Jurists, president of the Nigerian Red Cross Association, chairman of Nigeria Cheshire homes, member of the International Olympic committee, member of the Nigerian Institute of International Affairs and Olori-Oluwo (or Grandmaster) of the Reformed Ogboni Fraternity.

== Personal life ==
He married Kofo Moore, who obtained a BA at Oxford and who was a daughter of the late Eric Moore, first Lagos member of the United Nations committee of experts advising on labor conventions and regulations. They had four children.
