= List of governors and governors-general of Nigeria =

The governor-general of Nigeria was the representative of the monarch of the United Kingdom in Colonial Nigeria from 1954 to 1960, and after Nigerian independence in 1960, the representative of the Nigerian head of state.

The office was created on 1 October 1954, when the Colony and Protectorate of Nigeria was created as an autonomous federation within the British Empire. After independence in 1960, the governor-general became the representative of the Nigerian monarch, and the office continued to exist till 1963, when Nigeria abolished its monarchy, and became a republic.

Flag of the governor-general of Nigeria

This article contains a list of governors and governors-general of the Colony and Protectorate of Nigeria, and later of the Federation of Nigeria; both as a British overseas possession and an independent monarchy.

Flag of Nigeria (1914–1952)

== Governor-general of Nigeria, 1914–1919 ==
Portrait	Name	Took office	Left office	Sovereign
	Sir Frederick Lugard (1858–1945)	1 January 1914	8 August 1919	George V

== Governors of Nigeria, 1919–1954 ==
Portrait	Name	Took office	Left office	Sovereign
	Sir Hugh Clifford (1866–1941)	8 August 1919	13 November 1925	George V
	Sir Graeme Thomson (1877–1933)	13 November 1925	17 June 1931	George V
	Sir Donald Cameron (1872–1948)	17 June 1931	1 November 1935	George V
	Sir Bernard Bourdillon (1883–1948)	1 November 1935	1 July 1940	George V Edward VIII; George VI
	Sir John Evelyn Shuckburgh (1877–1953)	1 July 1940	1942	George VI
	Sir Alan Burns (1887–1980)	1942	18 Dec 1943	George VI
	Arthur Richards, 1st Baron Milverton (1885–1978)	18 Dec 1943	5 February 1948	George VI
	Sir John Macpherson (1898–1971)	5 February 1948	1 October 1954	George VI; Elizabeth II

== Governors-general of Nigeria, 1954–1963 ==
Following is a list of people who have served as governor-general of Nigeria.

No.	Portrait	Name (Birth–Death)	Term of office			Monarch (Reign)
No.	Portrait	Name (Birth–Death)	Took office	Left office	Time in office	Monarch (Reign)
Governors-general representing the monarch of the United Kingdom
1		Sir John Stuart Macpherson (1898–1971)	1 October 1954	15 June 1955	257 days	Elizabeth II (1954–1960)
2		Sir James Wilson Robertson (1899–1983)	15 June 1955	1 October 1960	5 years, 108 days	Elizabeth II (1954–1960)
Governors-General representing the monarch of Nigeria
(2)		Sir James Wilson Robertson (1899–1983)	1 October 1960	16 November 1960	46 days	Elizabeth II (1960–1963)
3		Dr. Nnamdi Azikiwe (1904–1996)	16 November 1960	1 October 1963	2 years, 319 days	Elizabeth II (1960–1963)

== Flag of the governor-general ==
Flag used in Colonial Nigeria (1954 to 1960)

Flag used in independent Nigeria (1960 to 1963)

== See also ==
- List of heads of state of Nigeria
- Lists of office-holders
