= Ibrahim Jalo =

Nigerian politician

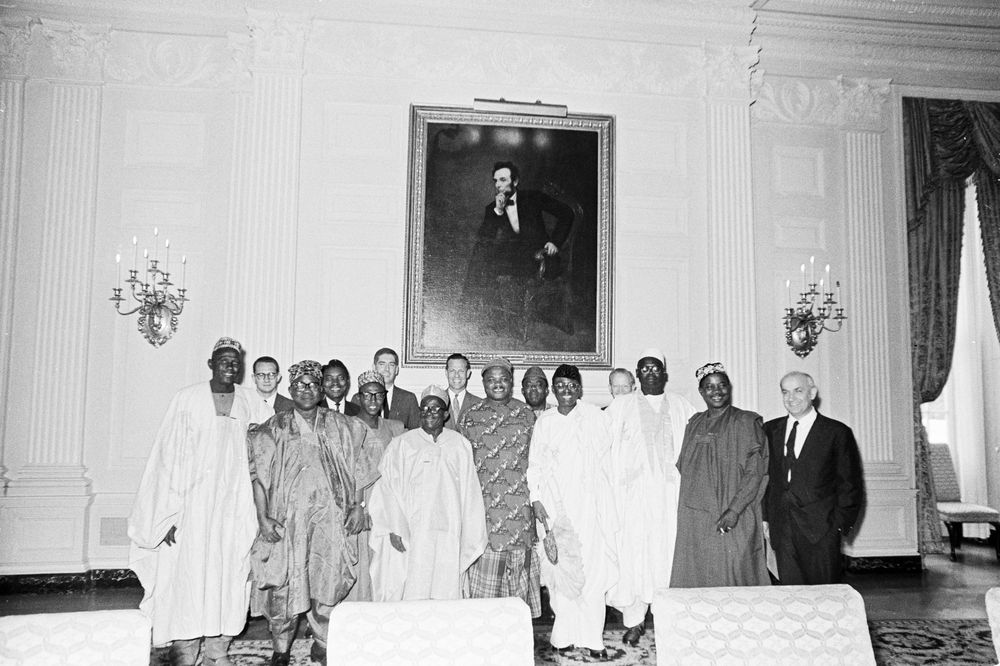
- Jalo as part of a Nigerian delegation to the White House in 1962.

Speaker of the House of Representatives of Nigeria
- In office 14 November 1960 – 15 January 1966
- Preceded by: Jaja Wachuku
- Succeeded by: Edwin Ume-Ezeoke (1979)

Senator for Bauchi State South East
- In office 1979–1983

Personal details
- Born: 17 December 1926 Gombe, Gombe State
- Died: 12 November 1984 (aged 57) Gombe
- Nickname: Masero

Ibrahim Jalo Waziri COS CFR (17 December 1926 – 12 November 1984) was a teacher, administrator, traditional leader and politician from North Nigeria who was twice elected as the Speaker of the House of Representatives of Nigeria from 14 November 1960 to 1963 and 1963 until the 1966 Military coup in January.

During the time of independence, he was representing Gombe Central. Prior to that he served as the Deputy from 1959 to 1960. During the 1979 election, he was the Bauchi State South East Senatorial District senator serving from 1979 to 1983 and was the Majority Leader during his second term as a senator. He was the chieftains title of 'Wazrin' Gombe till his death.

== Background ==
Jalo was born in Gombe, Gombe State into a royal advisor family of Gombe Emirates, his father, a Fulani from the dynasty of Nafada Muhammadu Jingudo was the 'Ubandoma' of the Emirate. He began his education in a Qur'anic school before in 1936 was enrolled in Gombe Elementary School until 1940 then he attended the Bauchi Middle School from 1940 to 1943 and there he went to attends the now known as Barewa College before as Katsina College then to Kaduna College and finally renamed to Barewa from 1943 to 1946. He enters the Teachers Training College, Zaria in 1946 and graduated in 1948 with a Grade II Certificate and he went for a West African Local Government Course from the London School of Economics from 1954 to 1955.

== Career ==
After he had obtained his Grade II Certificate, he started working as a teacher in 1948 at the Bauchi Middle School to 1952 where he became Headmaster at the Gombe Senior Primary School, the same year his father the chieftains holder of 'Ubandoma' of Gombe Emirate died as that result his succeed his title as the Ubandoma of Gombe Emirate, with that traditional position and as headmaster he usually performs two functions.

He was later titled the Waziri of Gombe Emirate during that time he was in London for Local government course in 1956 there after he came back to the country.

=== 1958 to 1966 politics ===
He joined the Northern People Congress political party in 1958 and contest for Regional legislature of Kaduna, after he had won the election he moved to Lagos and there after in 1959 to 1960, he was made Deputy Speaker of the Representative the last position held before becoming the Speaker of the Representative in 1960 to 1966.

When serving as the Speaker he extend electricity supply to some part of Gombe including providing the communication services unlike the one of 'telephone' and was once the Chief Architea of extending the North-Eastern Railway-line through the north Nigeria having situate the head place in Bauchi.

=== 1966 coup ===
As of the 1966 coup, he returned to Gombe Native Authority as Councilor for Works, he help to build the drainage system in Tudun Wada to Jekadafari in Gombe after the defuna North-Eastem State creation happened in 1968, he served twice as a permanent member in the Public Service Commission to 1973 and became the chairman in the Local Government Service Board. Serving as chairman he ensured the relationship between traditional leaders was very corral and he was later appointed as the Chairman of the Nigeria Industrial Development Bank, holding that position from 1973 to 1976 made him upon to introduced branch offices in Kaduna, Aba and Bauchi and approved granting loans to groups or individuals at the locations without referring them to Lagos which is the head office during, after Bauchi State was created, he was made the Chairman of Public Service Commission taking response of appointment and promotions of civil servants in the State. In 1978 to 1979, he was the Bauchi State Commissioner for Education.

Jalo was before serving as commissioner, a National Chief Scout by the 1977 head of state and participate in wiping out the widely view of that the Scout is a Christian body, and made his children Scouts and Girls Guides to as an example and later in that year he was made the Chairman of the New India Assurance Company.

== Return to politics ==
He returns to politics in 1979 under the National party of Nigeria and won the Bauchi State South East Senatoral seat in the house he was the Chairman Committee on Foreign Relations, as of the 1983 he contested again and won and became the Senate Majority Leader. His time in the Senate house was among those who initiates the plan for federal own houses in all state in the country as of his first tenure in 1981. He had well represents his country in various international conferences amongst is the United Nations' Apartheid Committee Seminar in 1980 and in the Commonwealth Parliamentary Conference in 1981. Before his demise he was an active member in the Gombe State Movement later was demolished by the Major General Buhari regime in 1984.

In 1983, he was honoured with a 'Commander of the Order of Senegal', Key of San-Francisco in California and 'Commander of the Order of Niger' by the President of Nigeria 1983.

== Bibliography ==
- Chukwudum, Dr Okoro, Onyeije (2009-03-31). Nigeria: Her Woes and Their True Remedies. iUniverse. ISBN 978-0-595-61380-9.
- The African Guardian. Guardian Magazines. July 1987.
- The Guardian. Starrite Publishers. 1971.
