= Prime Minister of Nigeria =

Former political position

- Flag of Nigeria

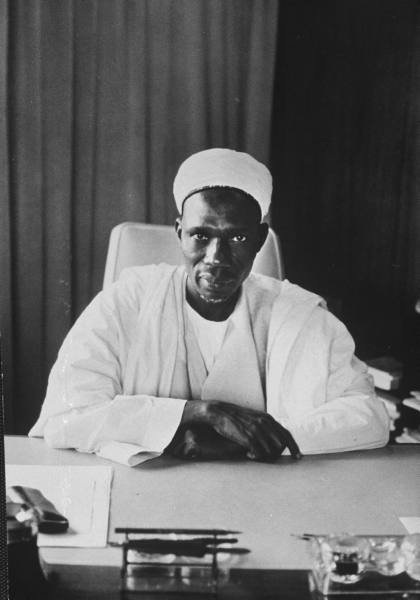
- Only officeholder The Rt. Hon. Sir Abubakar Tafawa Balewa (1 October 1960 – 15 January 1966)
- Federal government
- Style: Prime Minister (informal); The Right Honourable (formal); His Excellency (diplomatic)
- Type: Head of government
- Member of: Council of Ministers
- Reports to: Parliament
- Seat: Lagos
- Appointer: Governor-General of Nigeria (1960–1963) President of Nigeria (1963–1966)
- Term length: At the Governor-General's pleasure
- Constituting instrument: 1960 Constitution of Nigeria
- Formation: 1 October 1960
- First holder: Sir Abubakar Tafawa Balewa
- Final holder: Sir Abubakar Tafawa Balewa
- Abolished: 15 January 1966

The prime minister of Nigeria was a political office in Nigeria. The Prime minister was the head of government in the country from 1960 to 1966, when the office was replaced by the president of Nigeria holding this role.

== History of the office ==
When Nigeria gained independence from the United Kingdom on 1 October 1960, it originally had a parliamentary constitutional monarchy with Queen Elizabeth II as the head of state.

But in 1963, Nigeria ended its status as a Commonwealth Realm and became a republic. The head of state was the president, while the prime minister served as the head of government. In 1966, the office of prime minister was abolished (as the inaugural holder of the office, Sir Abubakar Tafawa Balewa, had been assassinated) and since then, Nigeria has been a presidential republic with the president as the head of state and head of government.

== Prime Minister of Nigeria (1960–1966) ==
No.	Picture	Name (Birth–Death)	Term of office			Political Party	Cabinet	Ref.
No.	Picture	Name (Birth–Death)	Took office	Left office	Time in office	Political Party	Cabinet	Ref.
Prime Minister of the Federation of Nigeria
1		Sir Abubakar Tafawa Balewa (1912–1966)	1 October 1960	1 October 1963	3 years	Northern People's Congress	Balewa II	
Prime Minister of the Federal Republic of Nigeria
(1)		Sir Abubakar Tafawa Balewa (1912–1966)	1 October 1963	15 January 1966 (Assassinated)	2 years, 106 days	Northern People's Congress	Balewa II–III	
Post abolished (15 January 1966 – Present)

== See also ==
- List of governors-general of Nigeria
- List of heads of state of Nigeria
