= Abubakar Tafawa Balewa =

Prime Minister of Nigeria from 1960 to 1966

The Right Honourable Alhaji Sir Abubakar Tafawa Balewa KBE
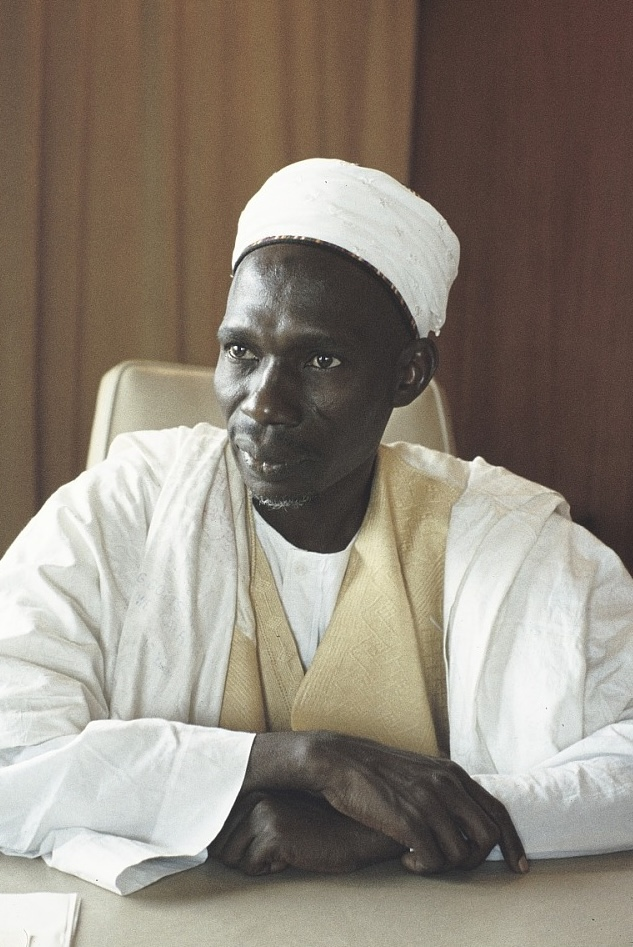

1st Prime Minister of Nigeria
- In office 1 October 1960 – 15 January 1966
- Monarch: Elizabeth II (until 1963)
- President: Nnamdi Azikiwe (from 1963)
- Governors-General: Sir James Wilson Robertson (until 1960); Nnamdi Azikiwe (1960–1963)
- Preceded by: Himself (as Chief Minister)
- Succeeded by: Position abolished (Johnson Aguiyi-Ironsi as Military head of state)

Chief Minister of Nigeria
- In office 30 August 1957 – 1 October 1960
- Monarch: Elizabeth II
- Governor-General: Sir James Wilson Robertson
- Preceded by: Position established
- Succeeded by: Himself (as Prime Minister)

Deputy Leader of the Northern People's Congress
- In office 30 August 1957 – 15 January 1966
- Leader: Sir Ahmadu Bello
- Preceded by: Position established
- Succeeded by: Position abolished

Member of Parliament; for Bauchi South West
- In office 1954 – 15 January 1966

Personal details
- Born: Mallam Abubakar; December 1912 Bauchi, Northern Nigeria Protectorate
- Died: 15 January 1966 (aged 53) near Lagos, Nigeria
- Resting place: Tafawa Balewa's tomb
- Party: Northern People's Congress
- Education: Barewa College; University of London Institute of Education
- Occupation: Politician

Pronunciation of Abubakar Tafawa Balewa

Sir Abubakar Tafawa Balewa KBE PC (December 1912 – 15 January 1966) was the first and only Prime Minister of Nigeria. A dominant figure of Nigerian Independence, he was a conservative Anglophile. His political career spanned almost a quarter of a century.

== Early years, 1912–1947 ==
Abubakar Tafawa Balewa was born in the village of Tafawa Balewa in Lere district of Bauchi province, Northern Nigeria Protectorate, in December 1912. He is the eldest child. His father was Yakubu Dan Zalla, a Gerawa man who married a Fulani woman, Fatima Inna. Balewa studied in a Madrasa at Bauchi before proceeding to an elementary school in Tafawa Balewa village and completed at Bauchi Government Provincial School. He studied at Katsina Higher College (presently called Barewa College) from 1928 to 1932 and became a secondary school teacher thereafter. In 1944 he became the headmaster of Bauchi middle school. After two years, he moved to the University of London Institute of Education, where he obtained an overseas teacher's certificate. Returning to Nigeria, he worked as Bauchi native authority educational assistant and a member of the advisory council of Emir Yakubu III. Balewa was later made the inspector of schools in Bauchi Province.

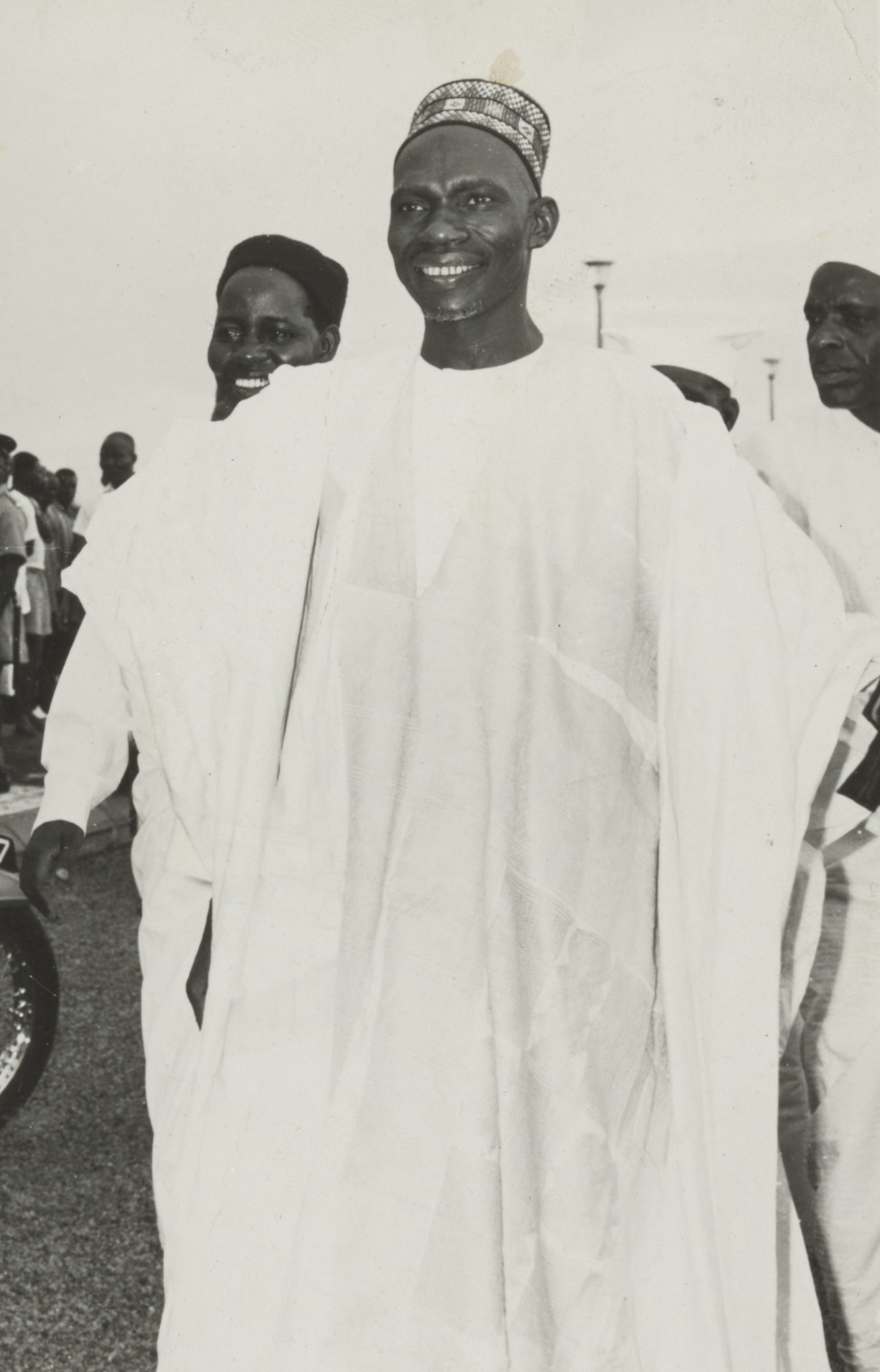
Balewa following independence.

== Political rise, 1947–1957 ==
Balewa was elected to the Central Legislative Council in 1947 after local authorities accepted the public's declaration that he should be the representative of Bauchi at the Northern House of Assembly. In 1949, he was promoted to the rank of an education officer along four other native authority educational assistants, citing the lack of senior service northerners with university degrees.

In the early 1950s, the British governor-general, John Macpherson, introduced an electoral college system, hence, in 1951, the Northern People's Congress (NPC) was established of which Balewa was a member. In 1952 he moved to Lagos as a member of the central house of representatives, and became minister of works. When the 1954 federal constitution was established, Balewa was selected as one of the three northern members of the council of ministers. He also served as the minister of transportation. In the same year, during the election of the president general of NPC party, he lost to Ahmadu Bello but became the vice-president.

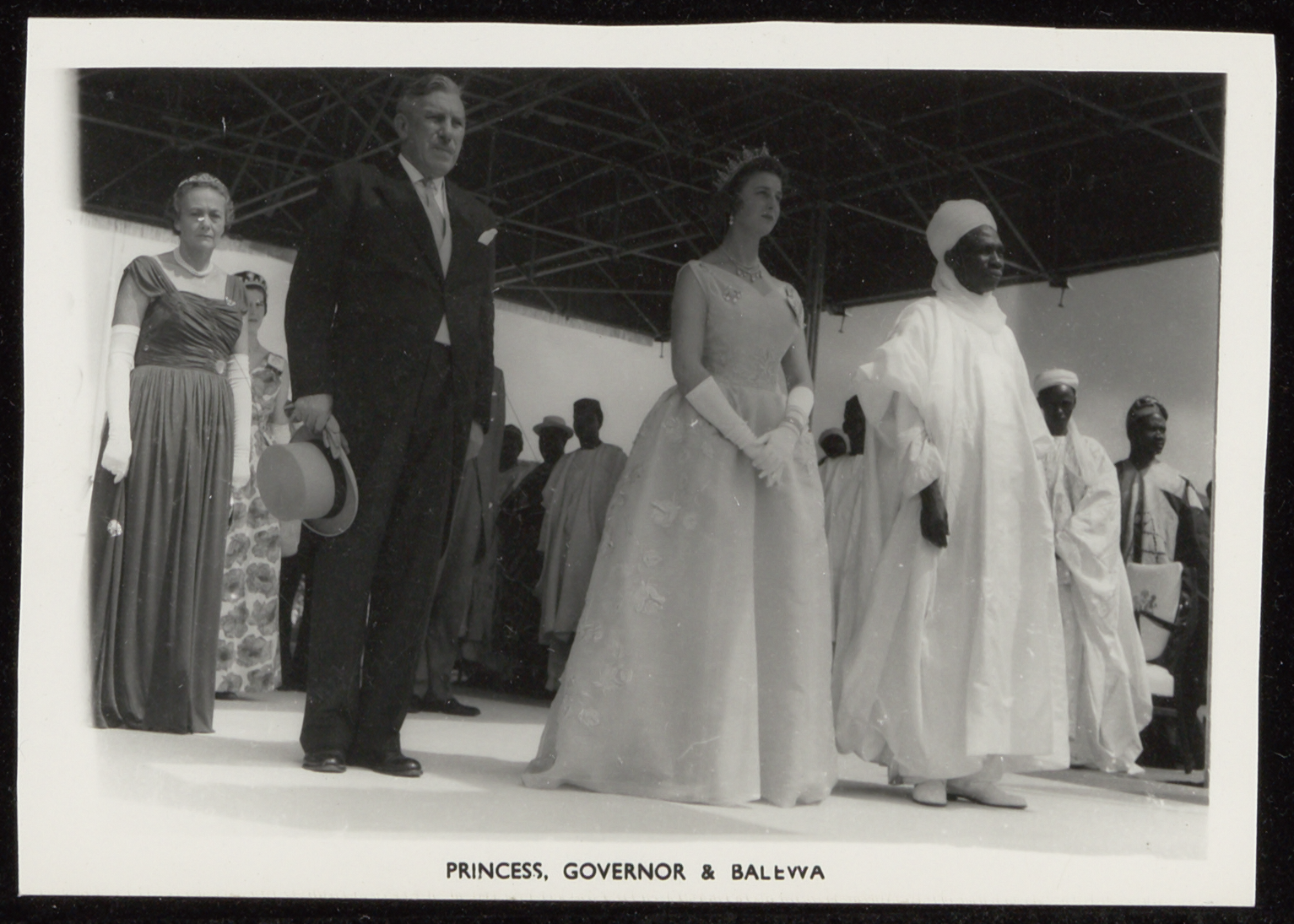
Balewa (far right), with Princess Alexandra, The Honourable Lady Ogilvy, for the proclamation of independence celebrations in Lagos

In 1957, NPC won the plurality of votes in the Federal House of Representatives and Balewa became the Chief Minister and designated Prime Minister. As part of his plans to unify the country towards the move for independence in 1960, he formed a coalition government between the NPC and the National Council of Nigeria and the Cameroons (NCNC), led by Nnamdi Azikiwe and also invited the Action Group (A.G.), the 1957 cabinet was constituted as an all party cabinet. Though, Awolowo, the leader of A.G. and premier of the Western region was skeptical of the plan, the national executive committee of Action Group party endorsed the National Government and Ayo Rosiji and Samuel Akintola were nominated by the party. During this period, Balewa developed a close relationship with K.O. Mbadiwe from NCNC and Akintola from AG.

== Prime Minister of Nigeria ==
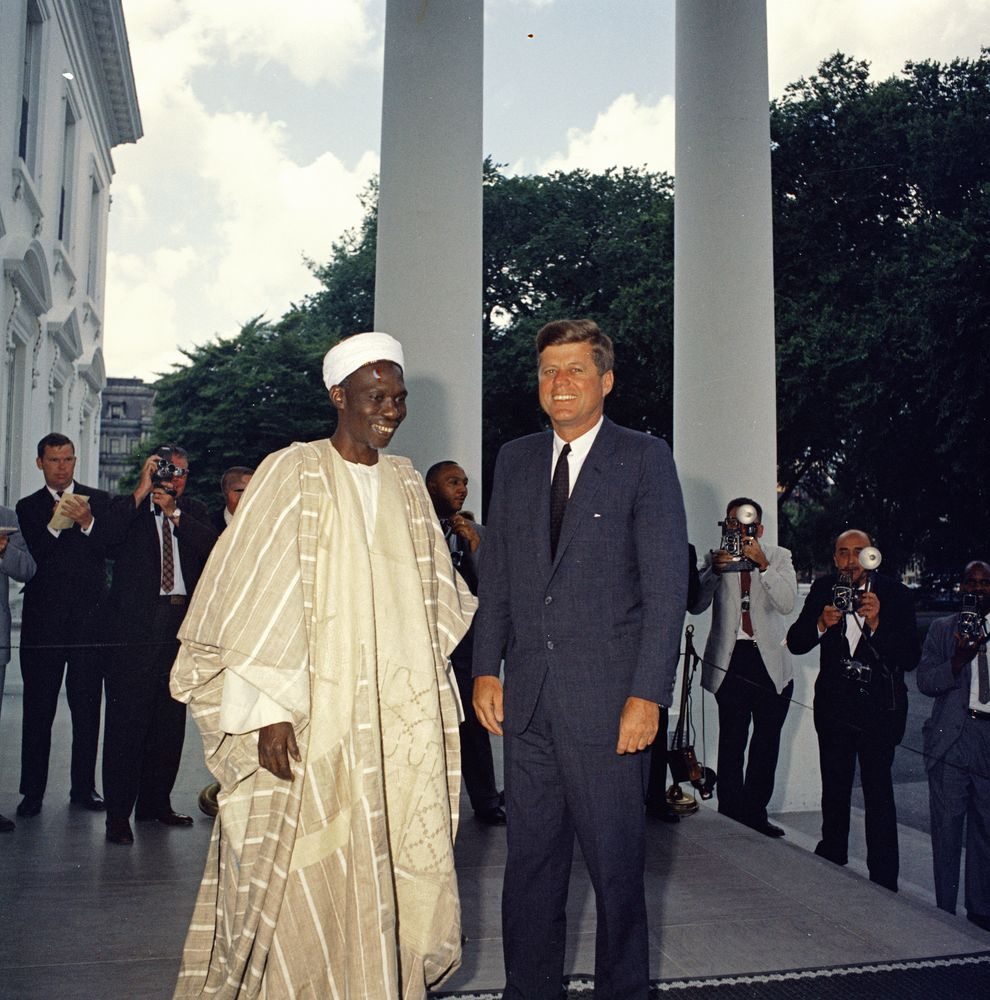
Balewa at the White House with President Kennedy, 1961

Balewa retained the post of Prime Minister of Nigeria when Nigeria gained independence in 1960 and was reelected in 1964.

He announced independence in a motion to Parliament on 18 January 1959:

That this House authorizes the Government of the Federation of Nigeria to request Her Majesty's Government in the United Kingdom as soon as practicable to introduce a legislation in the Parliament of the United Kingdom providing for the establishment of the Federation of Nigeria on October 1, 1960 as an Independent Sovereign State, and to request Her Majesty's Government in the United Kingdom at the appropriate time to support with the other Member Governments of the Commonwealth, Nigeria's desire to become a member of the Commonwealth. This is a great day for Nigeria. It marks the beginning of the last stage of our march toward independence and all of us who are here today should be thankful to Almighty God who has given us the opportunity to witness the events of this most memorable time.

— Abubakar Tafawa Balewa, Mr. Prime Minister: A Selection of Speeches Made by Alhaii the Right Honourable Sir Abubakar Tafawa Balewa,

=== Domestic policy ===
==== The Republic ====
Nigeria adopted a new constitution in 1963 which abolished the monarchy and the office of governor-general, with Nigeria becoming a parliamentary republic within the Commonwealth and Nnamdi Azikiwe as President of Nigeria and head of state.

==== Regional policy ====
Prior to Nigeria's independence, a constitutional conference in 1954 had adopted a regional political framework for the country, with all regions given a considerable amount of political freedom. The three regions then were composed of diverse cultural groups. The premiers and some prominent leaders of the regions later took on a policy of guiding their regions against political encroachment from other regional leaders. Later on, this political environment influenced the Balewa administration. His term in office was turbulent, with regional factionalism constantly threatening his government.

However, a treason charge and conviction against one of the western region's leaders, Obafemi Awolowo, led to protest and condemnation from many of his supporters. The 1965 election in the region later produced violent protests. Rioting and violence were soon synchronous with what was perceived as inordinate political encroachment and an over-exuberant election outcome for Awolowo's western opponents.

=== Foreign policy ===
As Prime Minister of Nigeria, Balewa, from 1960 to 1961, doubled as Foreign Affairs advocate of Nigeria. In 1961, the Balewa government created an official Foreign Affairs and Commonwealth Relations ministerial position in favour of Jaja Wachuku who became, from 1961 to 1965, the first substantive Nigerian Minister of Foreign Affairs and Commonwealth Relations, later called External Affairs. A week after taking office, he arrived in the United States on his first foreign visit to address the United Nations.

==== Africa ====
However, as Prime Minister of Nigeria, Balewa played important roles in the continent's formative indigenous rule. He was an important leader in the formation of the Organisation of African Unity and creating a cooperative relationship with French speaking African countries. He was also instrumental in negotiations between Moise Tshombe and the Congolese authorities during the Congo Crisis of 1960–1964. He led a vocal protest against the Sharpeville Massacre of 1960 and also entered into an alliance with Commonwealth ministers who wanted South Africa to leave the Commonwealth in 1961.

==== United States ====
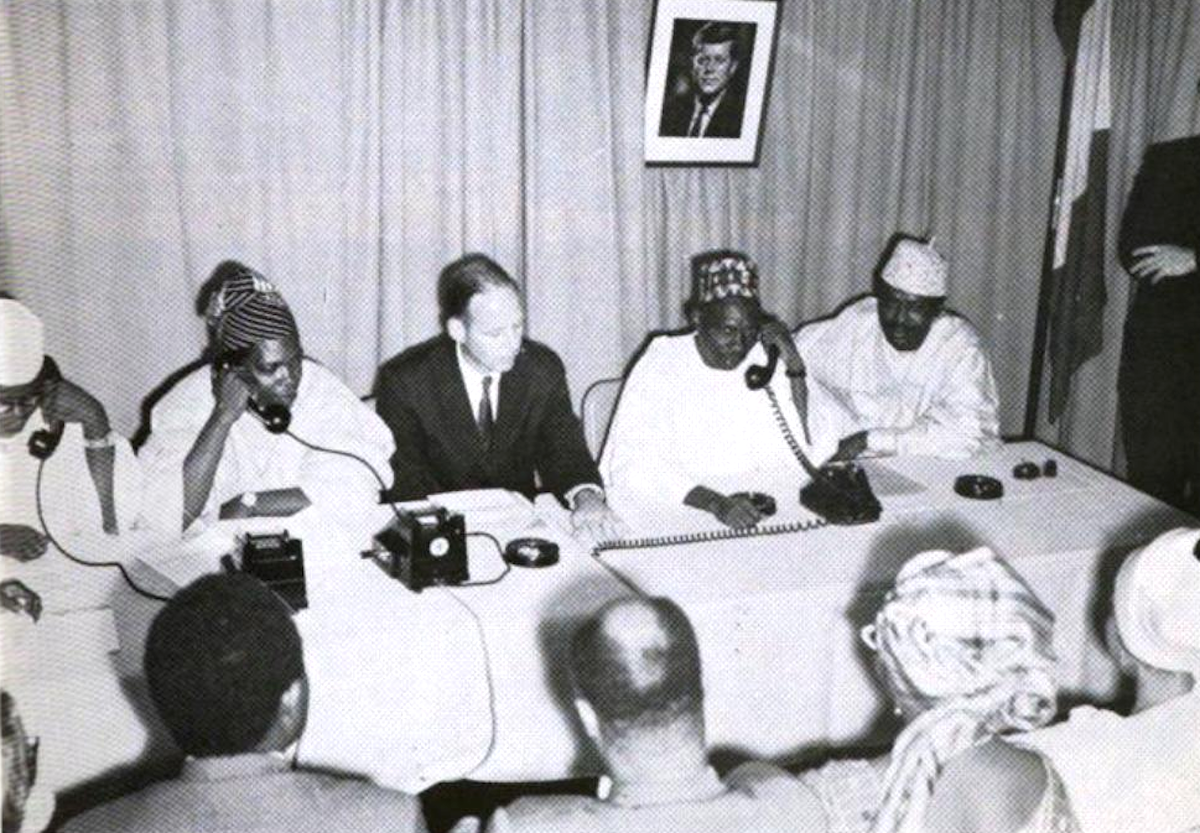
Prime Minister Balewa (2nd from right) talks to President Kennedy on the first live broadcast via the SYNCOM satellite from Lagos.

Balewa visited the US in 1961 for eight days, four of which he spent in Washington at Blair House. During his visit, he became the first Nigerian leader to address a Joint session of the United States Congress and visited the Islamic Center of Washington. He had an enormous amount of respect for President John F. Kennedy, describing him, and his age in particular as "matured as that of any older statesman." He took part in the launch of the Syncom 2 NASA program, allowing him to phone for President Kennedy from the USNS Kingsport docked at Lagos Harbor via the SYNCOM satellite on 23 August 1963. It marked the first live two-way call between heads of government by satellite.

==== Commonwealth ====
Balewa, during his premiership, attached great importance to Nigeria's Commonwealth membership, declaring in a UN speech, "We shall not forget our old friends."

==== Eastern Bloc ====
Balewa had a pro-West orientation in his foreign policy, which represented for abhorrence to USSR and other Eastern Bloc states. As a result, the circulation of communist literature in Nigeria was banned and students were discouraged from taking Soviet educational scholarship. Balewa had personally assured the British government "we shall use every means in our power to prevent the infiltration of communism and communist ideas into Nigeria." At one point, the Soviets were implicated in a plot to overthrow Balewa's government.

=== Overthrow and murder ===
Balewa was overthrown and murdered in a military coup on 15 January 1966, as were many other leaders, including his old companion Ahmadu Bello. The circumstances of his death still remain unresolved. His body was discovered at a roadside near Lagos six days after he was ousted from office. Balewa was buried in Bauchi. News of his assassination spurred violent riots throughout Northern Nigeria and ultimately led to the bloody counter-coup of July 1966.

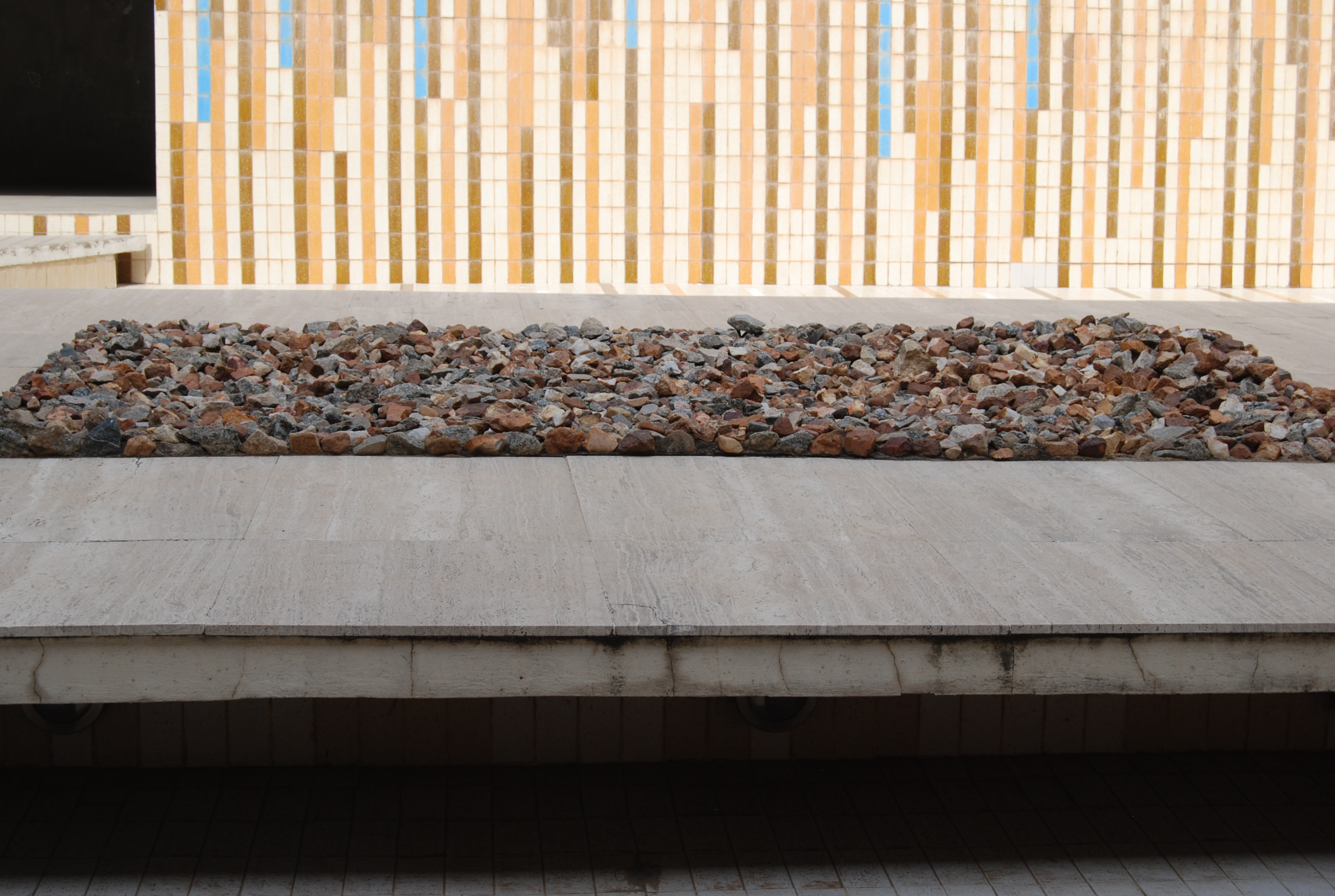
Grave of Sir Abubakar Tafawa Balewa

== Legacy and tributes ==
=== Literary work ===
In 1933, Balewa wrote Shaihu Umar, a novella about a pious Muslim in response to a request by Rupert East, the head of the colonial Translation Bureau, to promote Hausa literature. Shaihu Umar was first published in 1934. An English translation by Mervyn Hiskett was published in 1967. Written in a prose homily structure, the protagonist, Shaihu Umar, recounts his events in his life's history. Events and themes in the novel deal with the trans-Saharan slave trade, familial relationships and Islamic themes of submission to the will of God. Shaihu Umar was staged as a play in the 1970s and filmed by Adamu Halilu in 1976.

=== Political views ===
Balewa advocated for the creation of a Nigerian Privy Council to domestically replace the Privy Council of the United Kingdom in a speech to the Legislative Council in April 1952. This was due to its judicial committee's seemingly in-sensitivities to regional differences in court cases.

=== Honours ===
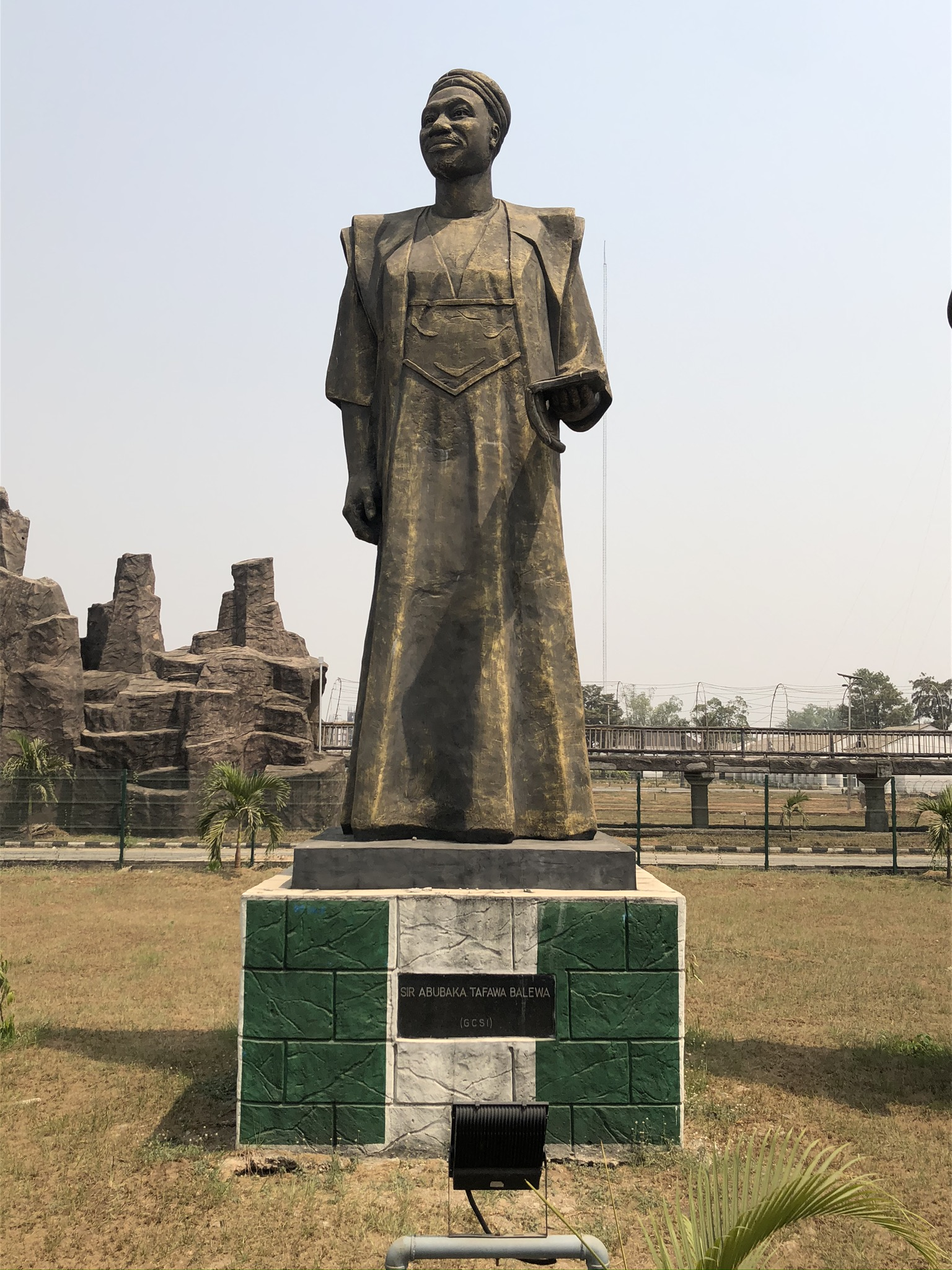
Statue of Tafawa Balewa in Owerri Imo State

In January 1960, Balewa was knighted by Her Majesty Queen Elizabeth II as a Knight Commander of the Order of the British Empire. He was awarded an honorary doctorate from the University of Sheffield in May 1960. He was also awarded an honorary doctorate of laws from the New York University in July 1961.

Balewa's portrait was placed on the 5 Naira Note. The Abubakar Tafawa Balewa University and the Sir Abubakar Tafawa Balewa Bauchi State International Airport in Bauchi was named in his honour.

== Personal life ==
Balewa was described as modest and self-effacing. At his death, his major assets included his house in Bauchi and a 50-acre farm where he vacationed when he wanted to relax. The farm was located on the way to Tafawa Balewa village about nine miles outside Bauchi. While in office, many official decisions were reportedly taken at the farm. Balewa was married to four women, who bore him nineteen children.

Balewa was buried in Tafawa Balewa's tomb at Bauchi.
