= Nnamdi Azikiwe (disambiguation) =

Nnamdi Azikiwe was the first President of Nigeria.

Nnamdi Azikiwe may also refer to many things named in his honor:

- Nnamdi Azikiwe International Airport, located in Abuja
- Nnamdi Azikiwe Stadium, Enugu, Enugu State
- Nnamdi Azikiwe University, Awka, Anambra State
- Nnamdi Azikiwe Library, a library located on the campus of University of Nigeria, Nsukka est. 1960
- Nnamdi Azikiwe University Teaching Hospital, government owned hospital in Nigeria
- The Nnamdi Azikiwe Prize, a literally leadership award
- Nnamdi Azikiwe Mausoleum, Zik’s Mausoleum
- Nnamdi Azikiwe flats, Zik’s flats
- Nnamdi Azikiwe Centre, centre in Enugu, Enugu State
