= African Morning Post =

Newspaper published in Ghana

- Type: Daily newspaper
- Founder: Nnamdi Azikiwe

The African Morning Post ^{(OCLC 33206007)} was a daily newspaper in Accra, Gold Coast, published by City Press Ltd. Editorial and Pub. Its editor-in-chief in 1934 was Nnamdi Azikiwe, who later also founded several newspapers in Nigeria, including the West African Pilot in 1937.

== See also ==
- Media of Ghana
- List of newspapers in Ghana
