= Zik's Flats =

Residential hostel estate at the University of Nigeria, Nsukka

- Interactive map of the Zik's Flats area

General information
- Status: Abandoned / Derelict
- Type: Residential complex
- Location: University of Nigeria campus, Nsukka, Enugu State, Nigeria
- Coordinates: 6.8567°N 7.3958°E
- Owner: University of Nigeria, Nsukka

Zik's Flats is a dilapidated residential hostel estate located on the main campus of the University of Nigeria, Nsukka (UNN) in Nsukka, Enugu State, Nigeria. Built and originally owned by Nnamdi Azikiwe, Nigeria's first president and the founder of the university, the estate was donated to the university in 1989 and subsequently used as student accommodation. The complex consists of 20 two-storey buildings, 12 bungalows, and ancillary facilities providing approximately 700 rooms and over 3,000 bed spaces.

== History ==
The University of Nigeria, Nsukka was founded in 1955 by Nnamdi Azikiwe and formally opened on 7 October 1960, making it one of Nigeria's first generation universities. Azikiwe, who later became Governor-General of Nigeria (1960–1963) and first President of Nigeria (1963–1966), built the flats comprising 20 two-storey residential blocks and 12 bungalows, providing approximately 700 hostel-size rooms and over 3,000 bed spaces. At the height of its use, the estate also contained expansive playgrounds, a row of commercial stores, a car park, a cafeteria, and several restaurants. The estate became the designated residential hall for first-year students and its proximity to Azikiwe's private compound, Onuiyi Haven, made it distinctive.

In 1989, on the occasion of his 85th birthday, Azikiwe transferred ownership of the estate to the University of Nigeria, Nsukka to help address the university's growing student accommodation needs.

== Abandonment and deterioration ==
Following Azikiwe's death in 1996, the estate began a process of gradual decline. By 2018, the estate had been abandoned, with cracked walls and buildings overgrown with weeds, while students still residing there were reported to be doing so at their own risk. By the early 2020s, it had been entirely vacated, with no students accommodated there for a period of at least seven years as of 2021. Investigative reporting by The Nation described the buildings as overtaken by vegetation, with fallen roofs, broken fixtures, and the presence of snakes posing a hazard to the adjoining Onuiyi Haven compound.

== See also ==
- Nnamdi Azikiwe
- University of Nigeria, Nsukka
- Education in Nigeria
