= My Odyssey =

1970 book by Nnamdi Azikiwe

- Author: Nnamdi Azikiwe
- Genre: Autobiography
- Publisher: C. Hurst & Co., The University of Michigan
- Publication date: 1970
- ISBN: 978-0-900-96626-2

My Odyssey is a 1970 autobiographical book by Nnamdi Azikiwe.

== Reception ==
Donald Rothchild of the International Journal of African Historical Studies wrote that the book "falls most satisfactorily into the historical background category, presenting in a highly personal manner the great effort he made in the cause of African freedom, dignity, and opportunity." William Tordoff of the American Political Science Review considered the book to be a helpful addition to the various biographies of Azikiwe that existed at the time. He described it as mostly "well written, though some sentences are ponderous". Naomi Mitchison of the Journal of Modern African Studies wrote that "the ebulient personality of Nnamdi Azikiwe, as well as the multiplicity of his friends, somewhat obscures a reviewer's clear view of this book."

== Works cited ==
- Nwagbara, Uzoechi (2011). "Sustaining Development through Servant-Leadership: A Commentary on Nnamdi Azikiwe's My Odyssey: An Autobiography". Journal of Sustainable Development in Africa. 13 (5). Clarion, Pennsylvania: Clarion University of Pennsylvania. ISSN 1520-5509.
