= Uche Azikiwe =

Nigerian academic, educator and author

- Born: Uche Ewah
- Education: University of Nigeria
- Spouse: Nnamdi Azikiwe (m. 1973; died 1996)
- Children: 2

Uche Ewah Azikiwe // MFR is a Nigerian academic, educator and author. She is the widow of former President of Nigeria Nnamdi Azikiwe. She is a professor in the Department of Educational Foundation, Faculty of Education at University of Nigeria, Nsukka. In 1999, she was appointed to the board of directors of the Central Bank of Nigeria(CBN).

== Early life and education ==
She was born to Sergeant Major Lawrence A. and Florence Ewah.

Azikiwe graduated with a Bachelor of Arts degree in English from the University of Nigeria, Nsukka (UNN). She then proceeded to obtain a master's degree in Curriculum Studies and Sociology of Education. In 1992, she obtained a Ph.D. in Sociology of Education/Gender Studies from the same university.

== Academic career ==
From 1981 to 1987, Azikiwe worked as a teacher at Nsukka High School. She moved to the Department of Educational Foundation, Faculty of Education, University of Nigeria, Nsukka in 1987.

== Affiliations ==
Azikiwe is a member of a number of professional societies and associations including, World Council for Curriculum and Instruction (WCCI), Network for Women Studies in Nigeria (NWSN), Curriculum Organization of Nigeria (CON), National Women Studies Association (NWSA), USA and Nigeria Association of University Women (NAUW).

== Personal life ==
Professor Uche Azikiwe is the widow of the first President of Nigeria, Dr Nnamdi Azikiwe.

She married Nnamdi Azikiwe at age 26, and had two children, Uwakwe Ukuta and Molokwu Azubuike.

== See also ==
List of people from Ebonyi State
