= M. C. K. Ajuluchukwu =

Nigerian journalist, politician and editor

Melie Chikelu Kafundu Ajuluchukwu known predominantly as M. C. K. Ajuluchukwu (1921 — 2003) was a Nigerian journalist, politician and editor. He was the first Secretary General for the Zikist Movement.
