= Nnamdi Azikiwe Centre =

Centre in Enugu State

The Nnamdi Azikiwe Centre, popularly known as the Zik Centre and often called the Zik historic centre is a cultural museum, educational monument and historical archive located in Enugu, Enugu State. Founded by the government of Enugu State under Ifeanyi Ugwuanyi in December 2022, the centre is dedicated to the first president of Nigeria, Dr. Nnamdi Azikiwe and occupies the Premier's Lodge where he operated and lived at the time of his tenure as the Premier of the Eastern Region of Nigeria from 1954 to 1960.

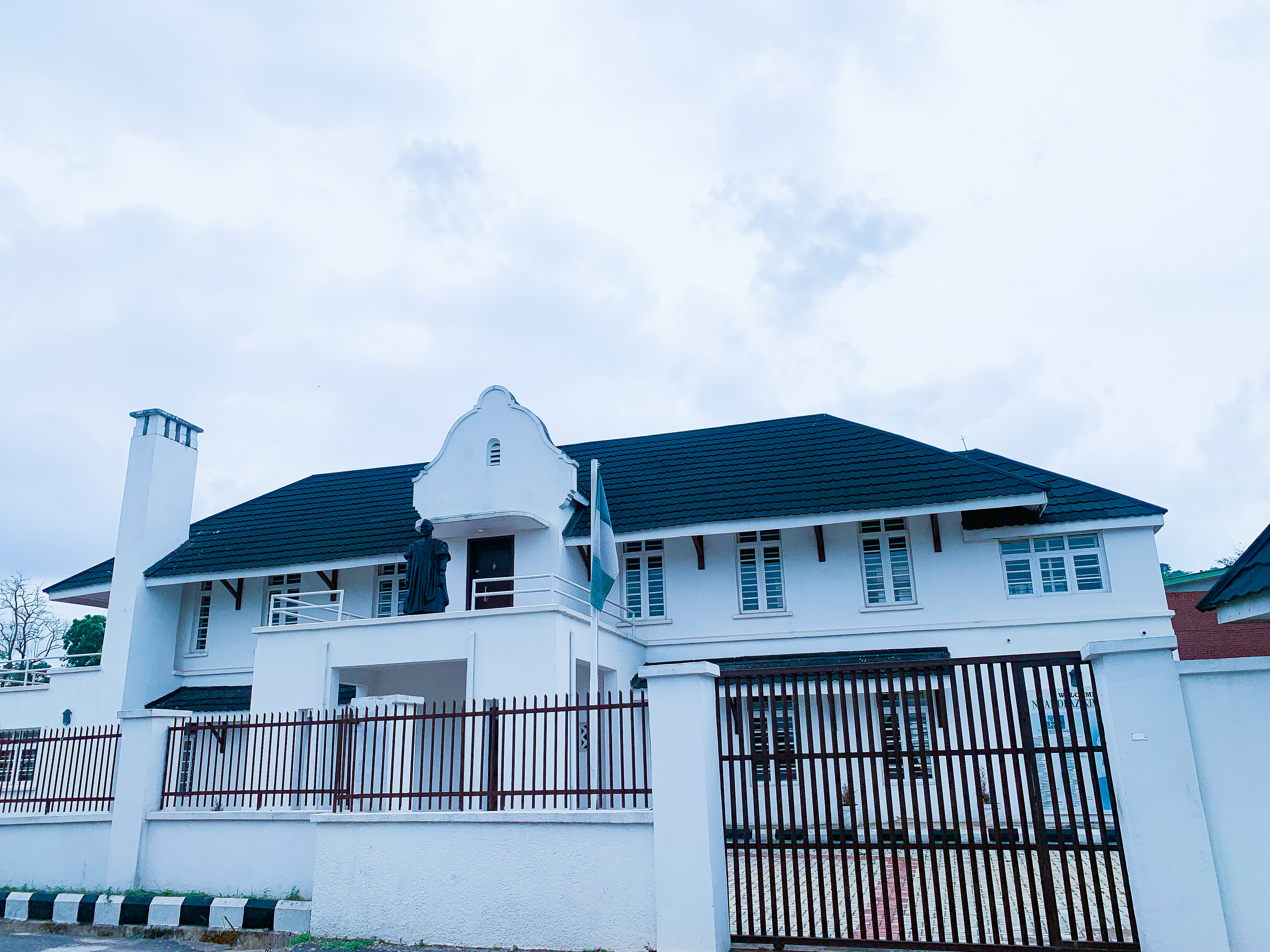
View of the Zik Centre Inside
