= Nnamdi Azikiwe =

President of Nigeria from 1963 to 1966 (1904–1996)

His Excellency The Right Honourable Nnamdi Azikiwe GCFR PC
- Azikiwe c. 1953

1st President of Nigeria
- In office 1 October 1963 – 16 January 1966
- Prime Minister: Abubakar Tafawa Balewa
- Senate President: Nwafor Orizu
- Preceded by: Position established (Elizabeth II as Queen of Nigeria)
- Succeeded by: Johnson Aguiyi-Ironsi (as Military head of state)

3rd Governor-General of Nigeria
- In office 16 November 1960 – 1 October 1963
- Monarch: Elizabeth II
- Preceded by: James Robertson
- Succeeded by: Position abolished

1st President of the Senate of Nigeria
- In office 1 January 1960 – 1 October 1960
- Preceded by: Position established
- Succeeded by: Dennis Osadebay

Premier of Eastern Nigeria
- In office 1 October 1954 – 1 October 1959
- Preceded by: Eyo Ita
- Succeeded by: Michael Okpara

2nd President of National Council of Nigeria and the Cameroons
- In office May 1946 – November 1960
- Preceded by: Herbert Macaulay
- Succeeded by: Michael Okpara

Chancellor of University of Nigeria
- In office 1961–1966

Chancellor of University of Lagos
- In office 1972–1976

Personal details
- Born: Nnamdi Benjamin Azikiwe; 16 November 1904 Zungeru, Northern Nigeria Protectorate
- Died: 11 May 1996 (aged 91) Enugu, Nigeria
- Party: National Council of Nigeria and the Cameroons (NCNC); Nigerian People's Party (NPP)
- Spouses: Flora Ogoegbunam (m. 1936; died 1983); Uche Ewah (m. 1973)
- Children: 7, including Chukwuma
- Parents: Rachel Chinwe Ogbenyeanu (mother); Obed-Edom Chukwuemeka Azikiwe (father)
- Education: Storer College; Howard University; Lincoln University, Pennsylvania; University of Pennsylvania; Hope Waddell Training Institution
- Occupation: Politician; lawyer; journalist; athlete; statesman

Nnamdi Benjamin Azikiwe GCFR PC (16 November 1904 – 11 May 1996), commonly referred to as Zik of Africa, was a Nigerian politician, statesman, and revolutionary leader who served as the first native governor-general of Nigeria from 1960 to 1963 and the first president of Nigeria during the First Nigerian Republic (1963–1966). He is widely regarded as the father of Nigerian nationalism, the founding father of Nigeria, as well as one of the major driving forces behind the country's independence in 1960.

Born in Zungeru in present-day Niger State to Igbo parents from Onitsha, Anambra State, Azikiwe learned to speak Hausa which was the main indigenous language of the Northern Region. He was later sent to live with his aunt and grandmother in his hometown Onitsha, where he learnt the Igbo language. Living in Lagos State exposed him to learning the Yoruba language, and by the time he was in college, he had been exposed to different Nigerian cultures and spoke the three major Nigerian languages.

Azikiwe was well travelled. He moved to the United States where he was called Ben Azikiwe, and attended Storer College, Columbia University, the University of Pennsylvania and Howard University. He contacted colonial authorities with a request to represent Nigeria at the 1932 Los Angeles Olympics since he was also an athlete. He returned to Africa in 1934, where he started working as a journalist in the Gold Coast (present day Ghana). In British West Africa, Azikiwe advocated as a political activist and journalist, for Nigerian and African nationalism.

== Early life and education ==
=== Youth: education and background ===
Map of Nigeria's linguistic groups: Azikiwe was born in the Northern region to domestic migrants. His ancestral homeland, Onitsha, lies in the Southeastern part of the nation.)

Azikiwe was born on 16 November 1904 in Zungeru, Northern Nigeria. His first name, "Nnamdi", given to him by his parents is an Igbo name which literally means "my father is alive". His father, Obed-Edom Chukwuemeka Azikiwe, a native of Onitsha, was a clerk in the British Administration of Nigeria. His mother Rachel Chinwe Ogbenyeanu Azikiwe (née Aghadiuno), who was sometimes called "Nwanonaku" was the third daughter of Aghadiuno Ajie and a descendant of a royal family in Onitsha; her paternal great-grandfather Ugogwu Anazenwu, was the Obi of Onitsha. Azikiwe had one sibling, a sister, named Cecilia Eziamaka Arinze.

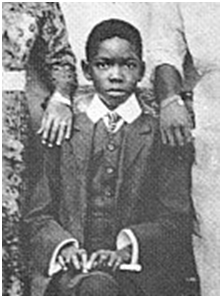
Azikiwe with his parents, c. 1910s

As a young boy, Azikiwe spoke Hausa, the regional language. His father, concerned about his son's fluency in Hausa and not Igbo, sent him to Onitsha in 1912 to live with his paternal grandmother and aunt to learn the Igbo language and culture. In Onitsha, Azikiwe attended Holy Trinity School (a Roman Catholic mission school) and Christ Church School (an Anglican primary school). In 1914, while his father was working in Lagos, Azikiwe was bitten by a dog; this prompted his worried father to send him to Lagos, that he may heal and continue school in the city. He then attended Wesleyan Boys' High School, now known as Methodist Boys' High School, Lagos. His father was sent to Kaduna two years later, and Azikiwe briefly lived with a relative who was married to a Muslim from Sierra Leone. In 1918, he was back to Onitsha and finished his secondary education at CMS Central School. Azikiwe then worked at the school as a student-teacher, supporting his mother with his earnings. In 1920, his father was posted back to Southern Nigeria Protectorate, in the city of Calabar. Azikiwe joined his father in Calabar, beginning tertiary education at the Hope Waddell Training College. He was introduced to the teachings of Marcus Garvey, Garveyism, which became an important part of his nationalistic rhetoric.

After attending Hope Waddell, Azikiwe was transferred to Methodist Boys' High School, Lagos, and he made friends with classmates from old Lagos families such as George Shyngle, Francis Cole and Ade Williams (a son of the Akarigbo of Remo). These connections were later beneficial to his political career in Lagos. While at Wesley Boys High school he excelled in his studies and gifted a book titled "from Log Cabin to the White House", a biography of James A. Garfield, former president of the United States, who rose from grass to grace. The book inspired him to be determined to succeed in life. Azikiwe heard a lecture by James Aggrey, an educator who believed that Africans should receive a college education abroad and return to effect change. After the lecture, Aggrey gave the young Azikiwe a list of schools accepting black students in America.

After completing his secondary education, Azikiwe applied to the colonial service and was accepted as a clerk in the treasury department. His time in the colonial service exposed him to racial bias in the colonial government. Azikiwe's choice to study in the United States instead of Great Britain was due to influences of Dr. James Kwegyir Aggrey, the biographies of President A. Garfield and Abraham Lincoln, the Marcus Garvey Pan Africanism and the existence of assistances for indigent students, which was not available in Britain. Determined to travel abroad for further education, Azikiwe applied to universities in the U.S. He was admitted by Storer College, contingent on his finding a way to America.

To reach America, he contacted a seaman and made a deal with him to become a stowaway. However, one of his friends on the ship became ill and they were advised to disembark in Sekondi. In Ghana, Azikiwe worked as a police officer; his mother visited, and asked him to return to Nigeria. He returned, and his father was willing to sponsor his trip to America.

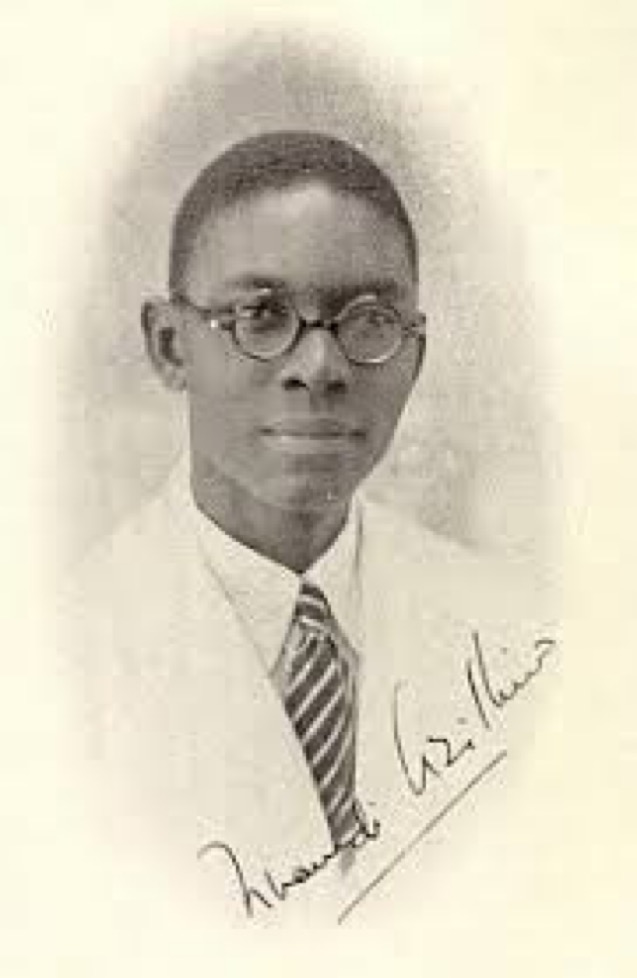
Azikiwe in Storer College (1926)

Azikiwe attended Storer College's two-year preparatory school in Harpers Ferry, West Virginia. To fund his living expenses and tuition, he worked a number of menial jobs before enrolling in Howard University in Washington, D.C. in 1927 to obtain a bachelor's degree in political science. In 1929, he transferred from Howard University to Lincoln University to complete his undergraduate studies and graduated in 1930 with a BA in political science. Azikwe took courses with Alain Locke. Azikiwe was a member of Phi Beta Sigma. He then enrolled at Lincoln University in Pennsylvania and in the University of Pennsylvania simultaneously in 1930, receiving a master's degree in religion and philosophy from Lincoln University in 1932 and a master's degree in anthropology from the University of Pennsylvania in 1933. Azikiwe became a graduate-student instructor in the history and political-science departments at Lincoln University, where he created a course in African history. He was a candidate for a doctoral degree at Columbia University before returning to Nigeria in 1934. Azikiwe's doctoral research focused on Liberia in world politics, and his research paper was published by A. H. Stockwell in 1934. During his time in America, he was a columnist for the Baltimore Afro-American, Philadelphia Tribune and the Associated Negro Press. Azikiwe was influenced by the ideals of the African-American press, Garveyism and pan-Africanism.

=== Associations and societies ===
- Young Men's Christian Association, Storer College (1925–27)
- International Cub of Howard University (1928)
- Stylus Literary Society of Howard University (1923)
- International Club of Columbia University (1930–32)
- Life Fellow, Royal Anthropological Institute (1933)
- Life Fellow, Royal Economic Society (1934)
- Life Member, British Association for the Advancernent of Science (1947)
- American Society of International Law (1933–34)
- American Anthropological Association (1932–1934)
- American Political Science Society (1933–34)
- American Ethnological Society (1933–34)
- Sodalitae Scientiae Civilis of Lincoln University (1934)

== Athletics career ==
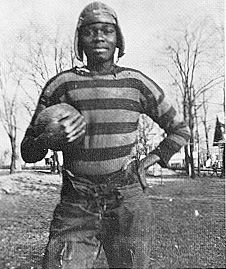
Azikiwe playing American football, Storer College (1926)

At the start of his career, Azikiwe competed in boxing, athletics, swimming, football and tennis. Football was brought to Nigeria by the British as they colonized Africa. However, any leagues that were formed were segregated. Nnamdi saw this as an injustice and he emerged as a leader in terms of connection sports and politics at the end of the colonial period. In 1934, Zik was denied the right to compete in a track and field event because Nigeria was not allowed to participate. This happened another time because of his Igbo background, and Zik had decided that enough was enough, and wanted to create his own club. Nnamdi founded Zik's Athletic Club (ZAC) which would open its doors to sportsmen and women of all races, nationalities, tribes, and classes of Nigeria. In 1942, the club went on to win both the Lagos League and the War Memorial Cup. After these victories, Nnamdi opened up more ZAC branches throughout Nigeria. During the war years ZAC would go on tours. ZAC matches would happen all over the country, and it made the people of Nigeria feel a sense of unity and nationalism that would help them fight for freedom.

In 1949, some ZAC players participated in a tour of England. On the return from the tour they stopped in Freetown, Sierra Leone, and Nigeria defeated the locals by 2 goals. This victory was more than a decade before Nigerian independence, but it marked the birth of Nigeria's National Team. Finally, after years of struggle, in 1959 the last British official left the NFA, and on 22 August 1960, a few weeks prior to its formal independence, Nigeria joined the world football body of FIFA. None of this would have been possible if it was not for Nnamdi Azikiwe. He united Nigeria through sport and brought about a sense of nationalism that was referred to as 'Nigerian-ness'.

=== Sports achievements ===
- Founder, ZiKs Athletic Club (with MRB. Oltun) for the promotion of athletics, boxing, cricket, swimming and tennis in Nigeria.
- Reserve Goalkeeper and Forward, Methodist Boys High School, Lagos (1921)
- Champion, High Jump, M.B.H.S, and Champion, Empire Day (1921)
- Champion, Welterweight, Storer College (1925–27)
- Champion & Gold Medalist, High Jump, HU Inter-Scholastic Games (1926);
- Gold Medalist, Cross Country, One Mile Run, Quarket Mile Run, and High Jump, Storer College Silver championships(1926)
- Medalist, Pentathlon, Storer College Championships (1925)
- Captain, Storer College Cross Country Team (1927)
- Gold Medalist, Cross Country, Storer College (1921)
- Bronze Medalist, Laurel-Baltimore Marathon (1927)
- Champion, Backstroke, Howard University (1928)
- Co- Captain, Lincoln University Soccer Team (1930)
- Winner, Two MIle Run, Dual Championship between Lincoln University & Cheyney State College (1930)
- Silver Medalist, Two Mile Run, Central InterCollegiate Athletic Association Championships at Hampton Institute Virginia (1931)
- Point Winner, Baltimore Cross Country Marathon (1929, 1930)
- Bronze Medalist, Richmond Cross Country Marathon (1931)
- Point Winner, Mid-Atlantic A.A.U. Cross Country Championships (1932)
- Gold Medalist, 1,000 yards run, Caledonian Games in Brooklyn, New York (1932)
- Gold Medalist, One Mile Run, and Three Mile Run, Y MC.A. Games, New York (1932)
- Silver Trophy, Half Mile Race, and Silver Cup Winner in the One Mile Race, Democratie Field Day Championships, New Haven, Connecticut (1933)
- Runners-up (with G.K Dorgu), Lagos Tennis Men's Double Championships Division B (1938)
- Winners (Anchor man), ZAC Freestyle Relay Team at the Lagos Swimming Championships (1939)
- Entered to represent Nigeria in the Half-Mile Race and One Mile Run at the 1934 British Empire Games, but was rejected on 'technical grounds' by the A.A.A of Great Britain. (This rejection made him write a famous letter, dropping his English name, Benjamin).

=== Membership ===
- Diamond Football Club (1922–24)
- Mercury Athletic Club of New York (1932–34)
- Gold Coast Lawn Tennis Club of Accra (1935–1937)
- Patron, Zik's Athletic Club (since 1956)
- President, Nigerian Cricket Association (1940–44)
- President, Nigerian Swimming Association (1938–41)
- Vice-chairman, Nigerian Boxing Board of Control (since 1949)
- President, Lagos District Amateur Football Association (1951–1954)
- President, Amateur Athletic Association of Nigeria (since 1952)
- President, Nigerian Table Tennis Association (since 1953)
- Vice Patron and Committee Member, Nigerian Olympic Committee, and British Empire and Commonwealth Games Association (since 1951)

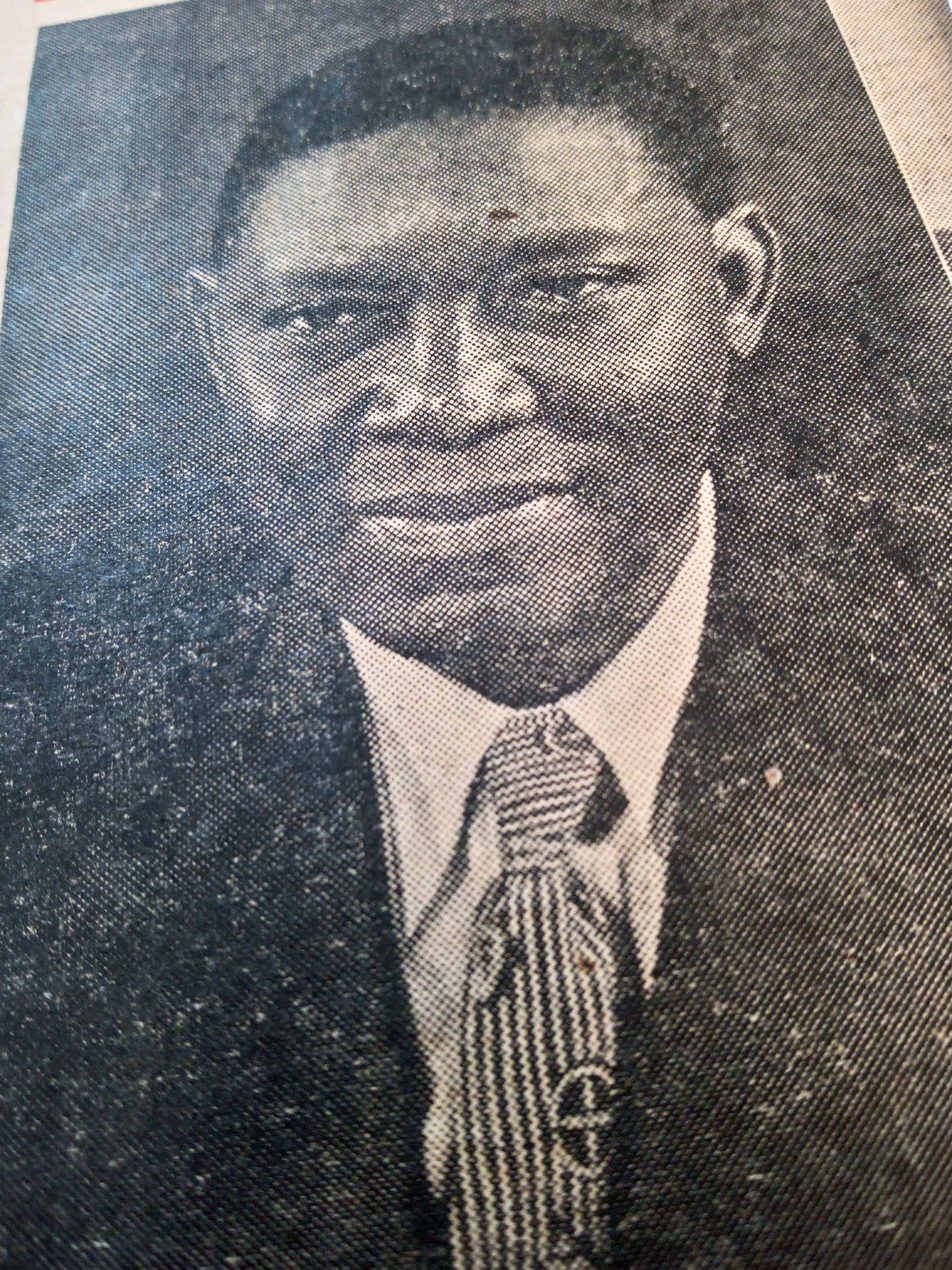
Old photo of Rt. Hn. Azikiwe Nnamdi

== Writing career ==
=== Journalism newspaper and editing ===
Personally, I believe the European has a god in whom he believes and whom he is representing in his churches all over Africa. He believes in the god whose name is spelt Deceit. He believes in the god whose law is "Ye strong, you must weaken the weak". Ye "civilised" Europeans, you must "civilise" the "barbarous" Africans with machine guns. Ye "Christian" Europeans, you must "Christianise" the "pagan" Africans with bombs, poison gases, etc.

— Excerpt from May 1936 African Morning Post article which led to sedition trial

The women's resistance against British taxation in 1929 witnessed an extraordinary massacre of women in Opobo by British commanded soldiers and other areas in eastern region. Azikiwe, hearing of the unruly event, wrote an article of condemnation titled 'Murdering women in Nigeria' while still studying in the United States in 1930 and a letter which he addressed to the then Pan-Africanist civil rights activist, W. E. B. Du Bois. While at Lincoln University, Azikiwe wrote his first book titled 'Liberia in world politics' in 1931.

Azikiwe applied as a foreign-service official for Liberia, but was rejected because he was not a native of the country. By 1934, when Azikiwe returned to Lagos, he was well-known and viewed as a notable figure by some Lagosians and Igbo community. He was welcomed by a handful of people, proving his writings in America evidently reached Nigeria. In Nigeria, Azikiwe's initial goal was to obtain a position commensurate with his education; after several unsuccessful applications (including for a teaching post at King's College, Lagos), he accepted an offer from Ghanaian businessman Alfred Ocansey to become the founding editor of the African Morning Post, a new daily newspaper in Accra, Ghana. He was given a free hand to run the newspaper, and recruited many of its original staff. Azikiwe wrote "The Inside Stuff by Zik", a column in which he wrote radical nationalism and black pride which raised some alarm in colonial circles.

As the editor, he promoted pro-African nationalist agendas. Yuri Smertin described his writing as, "passionately denunciatory articles and public statements which censured the existing colonial order: the restrictions on the African's right to express their opinions, and racial discrimination". Yuri also criticized those Africans who belonged to the 'elite' of colonial society and favoured retaining the existing order, as they regarded it as the "basis of their well-being. During Azikiwe's stay in Accra, he advanced his New Africa philosophy later explored in his book, Renascent Africa.

In the philosophic ideal, Azikiwe argued that "it is a state where Africans would be divorced from ethnic affiliations and traditional authorities and transformed by five philosophical pillars: spiritual balance, social regeneration, economic determinism, mental emancipation and risorgimento nationalism". Azikiwe did not shy away from Gold Coast politics, and the paper supported the local Mambii party. The Post, a local newspaper published a 15 May 1936 article, "Has the African a God?" by I. T. A. Wallace-Johnson, and Azikiwe (as editor) was tried for sedition. He was originally found guilty and sentenced to six months imprisonment. On his conviction, Zik declared, "if because I am an instrument of destiny through which imperialism in West Africa is to be challenged and liquidated, and if in this mission I am compelled to pay the supreme penalty, then there is no need for me to quake or to quiver. I am becoming convinced day by day that the New Africa is destined to become a reality. No force under the heavens can stem it. Even my death cannot postpone its crystallization." He was later acquitted by the supreme West African Court of Appeal.

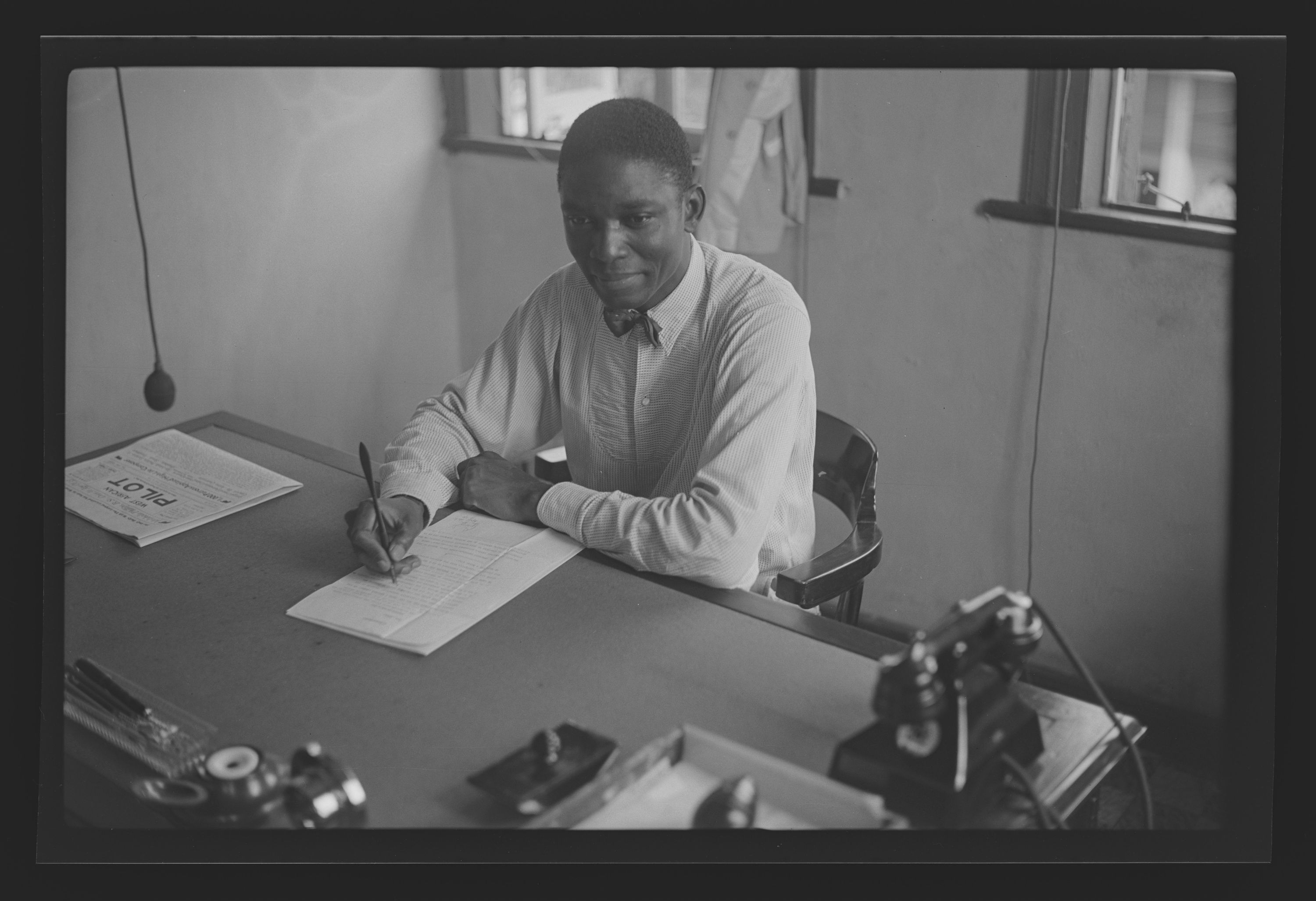
Azikiwe in his Office, 1937

Azikiwe returned to Lagos in 1937 and founded the West African Pilot, a newspaper which he used to promote nationalism in Nigeria, while the Zik Group established newspapers treating topics in politics and economy in important cities throughout the country. The group's flagship newspaper was the West African Pilot, which used Dante Alighieri's "Show the light and the people will find the way" as its motto. Other publications were the Southern Nigeria Defender from Warri (later Ibadan), the Eastern Guardian (founded in 1940 and published in Port Harcourt), and the Nigerian Spokesman in Onitsha. In 1944, the group acquired Dusé Mohamed Ali's The Comet. Azikiwe's newspaper venture was a business, as well as a tool for politics and advocacy. The Pilot focused less on advertising than on circulation, largely because expatriate firms dominated the Nigerian economy. Many of Azikiwe's newspapers emphasized sensationalism and human-interest stories; the Pilot introduced sports coverage and a women's section, increasing coverage of Nigerian events compared with the competing news source Daily Times (which emphasized expatriate and foreign-news-service stories). The Pilot's initial run was 6,000 copies daily; at its peak in 1950, it was printing over 20,000 copies. Azikiwe founded other business ventures (such as the African Continental Bank and the Penny Restaurant) at this time, and used his newspapers to advertise them.

Before World War II, the West African Pilot was seen as a paper trying to build a circulation base rather than overtly radical. The paper's editorials and political coverage focused on injustice to Africans, criticism of the colonial administration and support for the ideas of the educated elites in Lagos. However, by 1940, a gradual change occurred. As he did in the African Morning Post, Azikiwe began writing a column entitled "Inside Stuff", which he sometimes tried to raise political consciousness. The paper's editorials called for African independence, particularly after the rise of the Indian independence movement. Although the paper supported Great Britain during the war, it criticized austerity measures such as price controls and wage ceilings. In 1943 the British Council sponsored eight West African editors (including Azikiwe), and he and six other editors used the opportunity to raise awareness of possible political independence. The journalists signed a memorandum calling for gradual socio-political reforms, including abrogation of the crown colony system, regional representation and independence for British West African colonies by 1958 or 1960. The memorandum was ignored by the colonial office, increasing Azikiwe's militancy.

He had a controlling interest in over 12 daily, African-run newspapers. Azikiwe's articles on African nationalism, black pride and empowerment dismayed many colonialist politicians and benefited many marginalized Africans. East African newspapers generally published in Swahili, with the exception of newsletters such as the East African Standard. Azikiwe revolutionized the West African newspaper industry, demonstrating that English-language journalism could be successful. By 1950, the five leading African-run newspapers in the Eastern Region (including the Nigerian Daily Times) were outsold by the Pilot. On 8 July 1945, the Nigerian government banned Azikiwe's West African Pilot and Daily Comet for misrepresenting information about a general strike. Although Azikiwe acknowledged this, he continued publishing articles about the strike in the Guardian (his Port Harcourt newsletter). He led a 1945 general strike, and was the premier of East Nigeria from 1954 to 1959. By the 1960s, after Nigerian independence, the national West African Pilot was particularly influential in the east. Azikiwe took particular aim at political groups which advocated exclusion. He was criticized by a Yoruba faction for using his newspaper to suppress opposition to his views. At Azikiwe's death, The New York Times said that he "towered over the affairs of Africa's most populous nation, attaining the rare status of a truly national hero who came to be admired across the regional and ethnic lines dividing his country."

== Political career ==
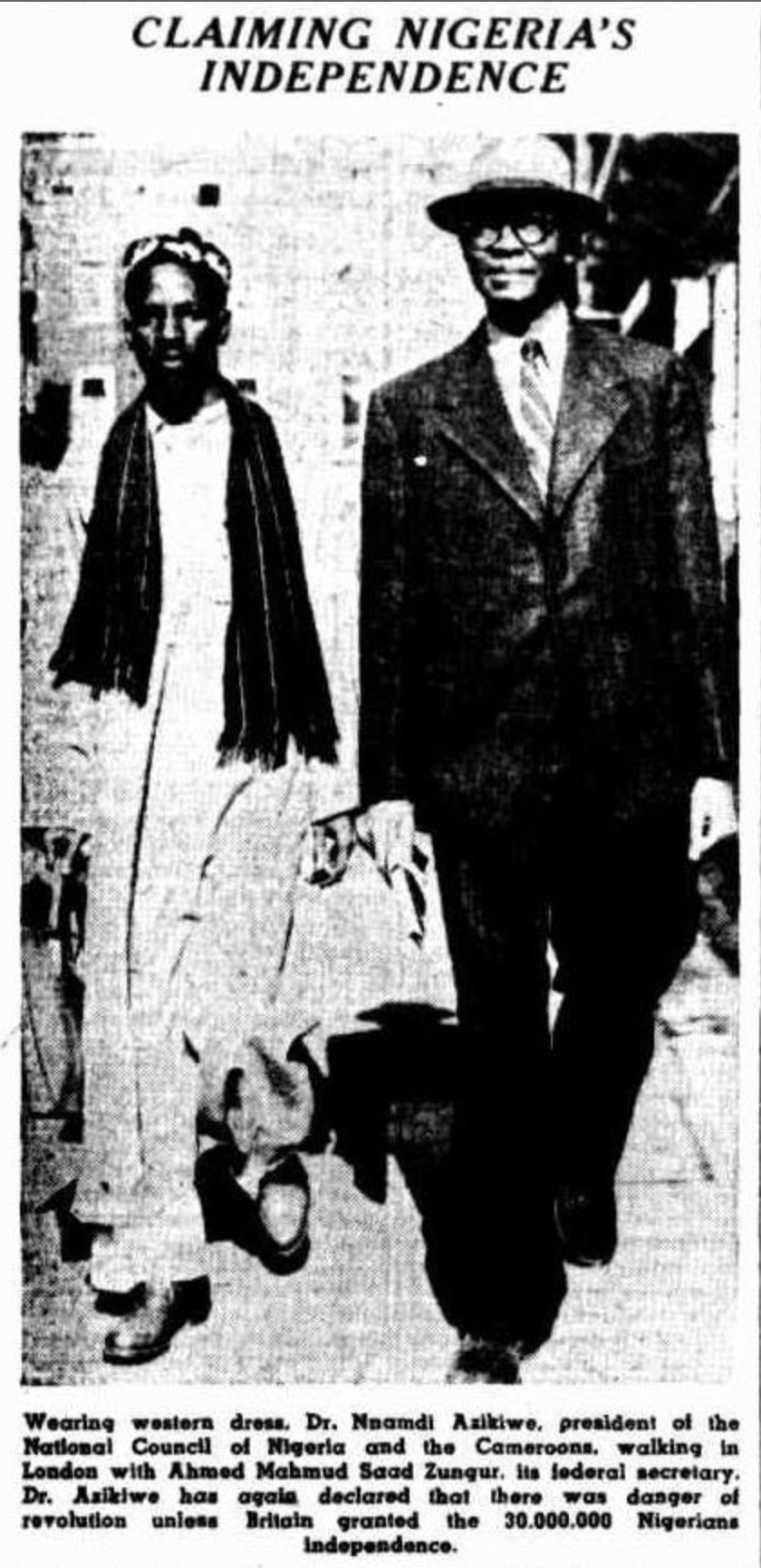
Azikiwe and Sa'adu Zungur in London (1949)

Azikiwe became active in the Nigerian Youth Movement (NYM), the country's first nationalist organization. Although he supported Samuel Akisanya as the NYM candidate for a vacant seat in the Legislative Council in 1941, while the executive council selected Ernest Ikoli.

Azikiwe resigned from the NYM, accusing the majority Yoruba leadership of discriminating against the Ijebu-Yoruba members and Igbos. Some Ijebu members followed him, splitting the movement along ethnic lines. He entered politics, co-founding the National Council of Nigeria and the Cameroons (NCNC) with Herbert Macaulay in 1944. Azikiwe became the council's secretary-general in 1946. NCNC was made up of nationalist parties, cultural associations, and labour movements including National Democratic Party, Nigerian Union of Students, Market Women Unions, etc. The party was the third political party formed in Nigeria after the Nigerian National Democratic Party (also founded by Herbert Macaulay), and the Nigerian Youth Movement. Notable members of the party included; Fumilayo Ransome-Kuti, M.I.Okpara, J.O. Fadahunsi, Eyo Ita, Margaret Ekpo, Raymond Njoku, F.S. McEwen, Festus Okotie-Eboh,Timothy Paul Birabi, A.K. Blankson, Dennis Osadebay, and T. O. S. Benson.

=== Conspiracy allegations ===
As a result of Azikiwe's support for a general strike in June 1945 and his attacks on the colonial government, publication of the West African Pilot was suspended on 8 July of that year. He praised the striking workers and their leader, Michael Imoudu, accusing the colonial government of exploiting the working class. In August, the newspaper was allowed to resume publication. During the strike, Azikiwe raised the alarm about an assassination plot by unknown individuals working on behalf of the colonial government. His basis for the allegation was a wireless message intercepted by a Pilot reporter. After receiving the intercepted message, Azikiwe went into hiding in Onitsha. The Pilot published sympathetic editorials during his absence, and many Nigerians believed the assassination story. Azikiwe's popularity, and his newspaper circulation, increased during this period. The allegations were doubted by some Nigerians, who believed that he made them up to raise his profile. The skeptics were primarily Yoruba politicians from the Nigerian Youth Movement, creating a rift between the factions and a press war between Azikiwe's Pilot and the NYM's Daily Service.

=== Zikist Movement ===
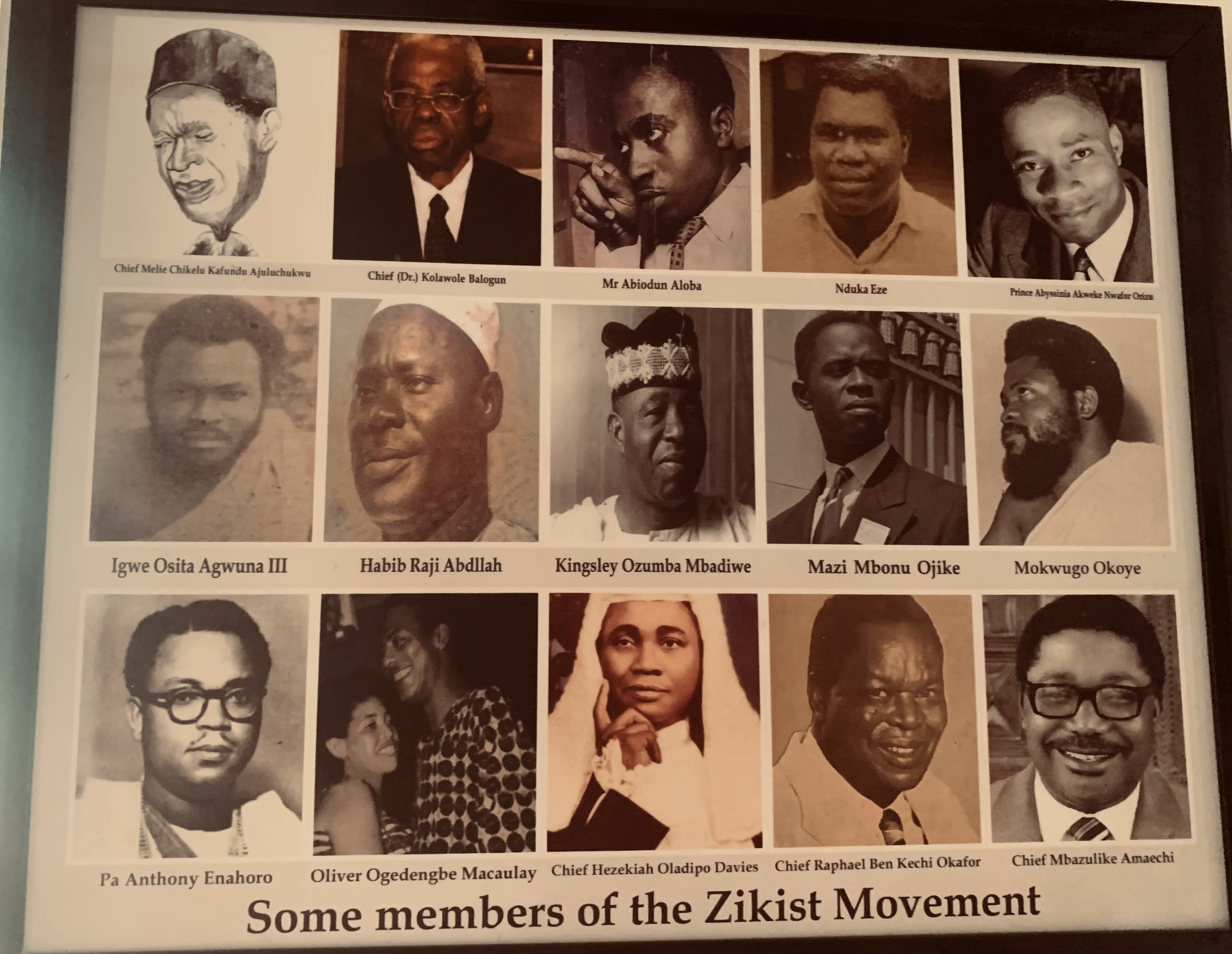
Members of the Zikist Movement

The youth rallied to fight against the colonial autocracy of Great Britain. One such group of young people were the Zikists. A non violent youth movement – led by Kolawole Balogun, Raji Abdallah, Osita Agwuna, M. C. K. Ajuluchukwu and Abiodun Aloba – was established in 1946 to defend Azikiwe's life and his ideals of self-government. Kola Balogun was the first president of the Zikist Movement. In February 1946, Balogun sent invitations to about 20 young men in Lagos, inquiring of their opinion on the national issues. Out of the twenty, twelve of them responded, leading to the creation of the Zikist Movement, as those men became its founding members. Nwafor Orizu coined the term 'Zikism' from Azikiwe which became the movement's name. He was a non member of the movement but a close associate and admirer of Azikiwe, and one of the several youths Azikiwe inspired to study in the US, alongside Eyo Ita and KO Mbadiwe. Raji Abdallah became the second president of the Zikist Movement, following Balogun's departure to London, serving from 1948 to 1949. He was instrumental in getting northern support and membership for the movement. Abdallah and Osita Agwuna (his deputy) had just formed the Anti-Colour Bar Movement (ACBM) in Kano, which was opposed to racial discrimination segregating whites and blacks in Nigeria. The ACBM later dissolved into the larger Zikist Movement. Similar to Balogun, in 1948, Abdallah was dismissed from his job with the Kano Rediffusion Service, a radio broadcasting service. The dismissal led him to get more involved with the Zikist Movement. He was fired because his involvement in the Zikist Movement was considered too overtly political for a civil servant.

Abdallah was later arraigned on 7 November 1948 at the Lagos High Court, where he gave a speech, thus saying, "This is an important day indeed. The most important, perhaps in the history of our country. I call it the most-important because it is today that we have to decide, whether we are to be free or remain hereditary bondsmen, who knows not that they must be free?" "I hate the Union Jack with all my heart. Because save in Britain, wherever it goes; far from uniting, it divides the people. I have nothing against King George VI of England. But hate the Crown of Britain with all my heart. Because to me and my countrymen, it is a symbol of oppression, a symbol of persecution and in short, a material manifestation of iniquity. We have passed the age of petition. We have passed the age of resolution. We have passed the age of diplomacy. This is the age of action. Plain, blunt and positive action. Therefore, I am here this evening, to call a spade a spade, an axe an axe, and a machete, a machete." "Today, I, Habibu Raji Abdallah, by the grace of God, President General of the Zikist Movement and Field Secretary of the NCNC, do hereby, declare myself a free and independent citizen of Nigeria. I owe no allegiance to any foreign Government, and in the absence of any' government of the people by the people and for the people of Nigeria'; I am henceforth, not bound to obey any law, other than the Nigerian Native Laws, Customs and International Laws. Therefore, I shall pay no more tax to this Government.Because if you pay, they will use that money to perpetuate their domination over you." Upon his sentence, he reacted in mitigation to the presiding judge, Justice Gregg, saying,

"if you sincerely believe that it is a crime to fight for freedom, then by all means, condemn me to death. Were I to be set free today, I cannot give assurance to muzzle my tongue. As for me, my conscience being clear, I shall be satisfied to leave the final verdict to God and His unfathomable river of time. So, proceed to fulfill the pleasure of those who put you here. I shall leave the final verdict to God."

His famous phrases travelled beyond the borders of Nigeria and was adopted by Kwame Nkrumah's Convention Peoples Party (CPP) of the Gold Coast (now Ghana). The Colonial Government did not take kindly to the revolutionary undertones of Abdallah's message. As a result, Abdallah along with nine other leaders of the Zikist Movement were arrested and charged with sedition. This crackdown on Zikist leadership led to another round of reorganization within the Zikist Movement, allowing Nduka Eze to emerge as president, after Abdallah's imprisonment, and Mokwugo Okoye as secretary-general. Zikists, in time, outgrew the NCNC, becoming more nationalist than their parent organization. Colonial officers deemed the Zikist movement an unlawful society and promulgated an Order-in-Council, outrightly banning the Zikist Movement on April 12, 1950. The group later dismantled and its members transitioned to politics, business, and traditional rulership.

=== Opposition to Richards constitution ===
In 1945, British governor Arthur Richards presented proposals for a revision of the Clifford constitution of 1922. Included in the proposal was an increase in the number of nominated African members to the Legislative Council. However, the changes were opposed by nationalists such as Azikiwe. NCNC politicians opposed unilateral decisions made by Arthur Richards and a constitutional provision allowing only four elected African members; the rest would be nominated candidates. The nominated African candidates were loyal to the colonial government, and would not aggressively seek self-government. Another basis of opposition was little input for the advancement of Africans to senior civil-service positions. The NCNC prepared to argue its case to the new Labour government of Clement Attlee in Britain. A tour of the country was begun to raise awareness of the party's concerns and to raise money for the UK protest. NCNC president Herbert Macaulay died during the tour, and Azikiwe assumed leadership of the party. He led the delegation to London and, in preparation for the trip, traveled to the US to seek sympathy for the party's case. Azikiwe met Eleanor Roosevelt at Hyde Park, and spoke about the "emancipation of Nigeria from political thralldom, economic insecurity and social disabilities".

The UK delegation included Azikiwe, Funmilayo Ransome-Kuti, Zanna Dipcharima, Abubakar Olorunimbe, P. M. Kale, Adeleke Adedoyin and Nyong Essien. They visited the Fabian Society's Colonial Bureau, the Labor Imperial Committee and the West African Students' Union to raise awareness of its proposals for amendments to the 1922 constitution. Included in the NCNC proposals was consultation with Africans about changes to the Nigerian constitution, more power to the regional House of Assemblies and limiting the powers of the central Legislative Council to defense, currency and foreign affairs. The delegation submitted its proposals to the colonial secretary, but little was done to change to Richards' proposals. The Richards constitution took effect in 1947, and Azikiwe contested one of the Lagos seats to delay its implementation.

=== 1950–1953 ===
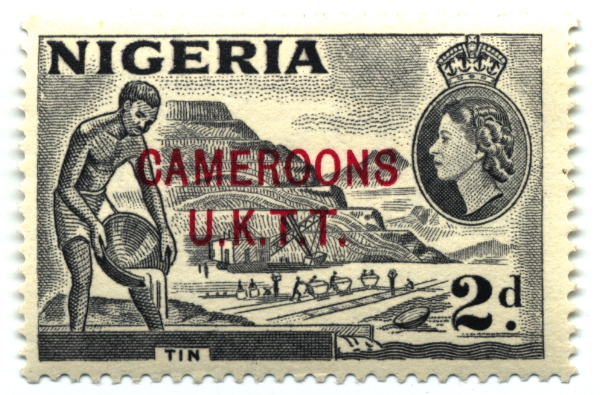
Nigerian stamp of 1953

Under the Richards constitution, Azikiwe was elected to the Legislative Council in a Lagos municipal election from the National Democratic Party (an NCNC subsidiary). He and the party representative did not attend the first session of the council, and agitation for changes to the Richards constitution led to the Macpherson constitution. The Macpherson constitution took effect in 1951 and, like the Richards constitution, called for elections to the regional House of Assembly. Azikiwe opposed the changes, and contested for the chance to change the new constitution.

Staggered elections were held from August to December 1951. In the Western Region (where Azikiwe stood), two parties were dominant: Azikiwe's NCNC and the Action Group. Elections for the Western Regional Assembly were held in September and December 1951 because the constitution allowed an electoral college to choose members of the national legislature; an Action Group majority in the house might prevent Azikiwe from going to the House of Representatives. He won a regional assembly seat from Lagos, but the opposition party claimed a majority in the House of Assembly and Azikiwe did not represent Lagos in the federal House of Representatives. In 1951, he became leader of the Opposition to the government of Obafemi Awolowo in the Western Region's House of Assembly. Azikiwe's non-selection to the national assembly caused chaos in the west. An agreement by elected NCNC members from Lagos to step down for Azikiwe if he was not nominated broke down. Azikiwe blamed the constitution, and wanted changes made. The NCNC (which dominated the Eastern Region) agreed, and committed to amending the constitution.

Azikiwe moved to the Eastern Region in 1952, and the NCNC-dominated regional assembly made proposals to accommodate him. Although the party's regional and central ministers were asked to resign in a cabinet reshuffle, most ignored the request. The regional assembly then passed a vote of no confidence on the ministers, and appropriation bills sent to the ministry were rejected. This created an impasse in the region, and the lieutenant governor dissolved the regional house. A new election returned Azikiwe as a member of the Eastern Assembly. He was selected as Chief Minister, and became premier of Nigeria's Eastern Region in 1954 when it became a federating unit.

== Premier of Eastern region ==
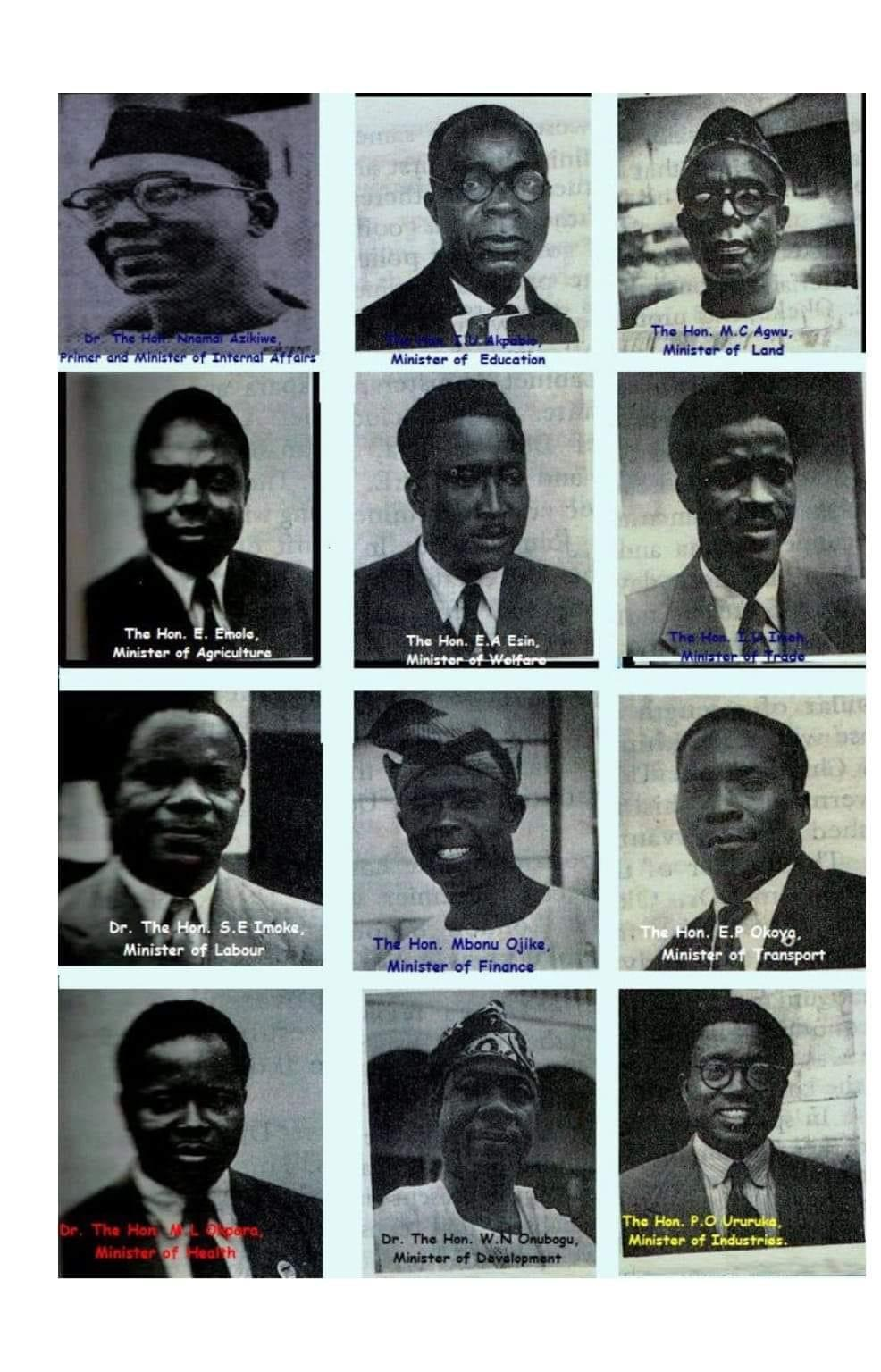
Eastern Region Ministers, 1956

Azikiwe became the premier of the Eastern Region in 1954 after a new constitution was put into effect. Azikiwe's Eastern region economic commission collaborated with Europe and North America in order promote investment for developments in textile, vegetable oil refineries, steel and chemicals in the region. He built the famous Nigeria Cement Company at Nkalagu in today's Ebonyi State, and it was commissioned on 1 January 1955. He built Niger gas. He also established Nigeria's first steel company, Niger Steel. He established Nigeria's first indigenous bank, African Continental Bank (ACB). The ACB's emergence caused the Western Nigerian government to set up the National Bank of Nigeria and the northern government to establish the Bank of the North. The ACB was instrumental to the emergence of a big entrepreneurial class in the East from the 1950s. The bank also played a critical part in the rise of the former Biafrans at the cessation of hostilities in 1970. He instituted education program that enabled Nigeria becoming the leading exporter of study abroad in Africa.

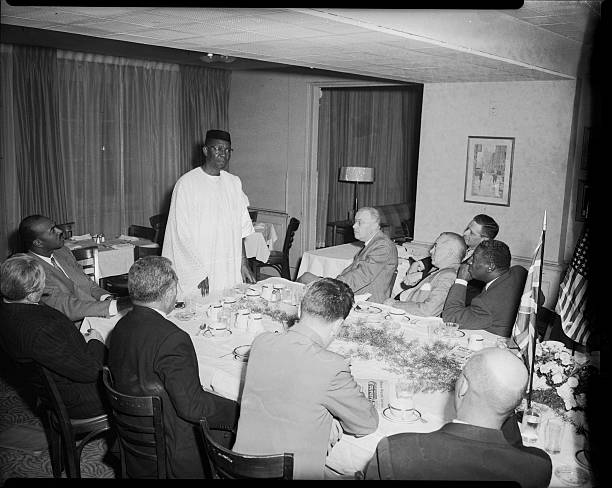
Azikiwe with P. L. Prattis, Earl Hord, Beverly Carter, and Bill Nunn Sr. in Pennsylvania (1955)

Azikiwe set up the Eastern Nigerian Development Corporation, which played a critical role in the building of the University of Nigeria at Nsukka, the country's first indigenous, full-fledged university, in 1960. The University of Nigeria was founded on 18 May 1955, after a law to establish the university was passed under the joint auspices of the Inter-University Council for Higher Education and Overseas and the International Co-operation Administration (now USAID), J.W. Cook (VC of University of Exeter), Dr John A. Hannah (President of Michigan State University), and Dr Glen L. Taggart, Dean of International Programmes (MSU), came to Nigeria in 1958. The team surveyed the site at Nsukka, and extensively investigated a great variety of factors pertinent to the establishment of a new university.

The foundation stone was laid during the celebration of Nigeria's independence by Princess Alexandra of Kent, who represented Queen Elizabeth II. Classes began on 17 October 1960 with an enrollment of 220 students and 13 members of the academic staff. It became the first University in Nigeria, the first university established by a Nigerian Regional Government, and in 1963, the first University to award Nigerian degrees.

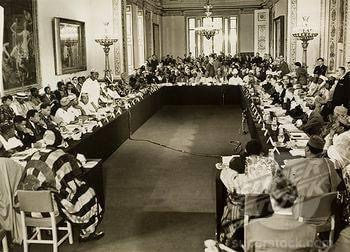
Azikiwe addresses a room full of British and Nigerian delegates in London, 1957.

In 1957, Azikiwe addressed British and Nigerian delegates at the 1957 Lancaster House Conference, where the federal constitution for an independent Nigeria was prepared. The meeting which was chaired by the British Colonial Secretary had some Nigerian delegates represented. The delegation was led by Abubakar Tafawa Balewa of Northern People's Congress, Obafemi Awolowo of the Action group, Eyo Ita of National Independent Party and Ahmadu Bello of Northern People's Congress.

On 3 February 1959, Azikiwe received Kwame Nkrumah (newly elected prime minister of Ghana) who toured eastern Nigeria. He visited eastern region house of assembly with his entourage, Hon. Minister of External Affairs, Mr. Kodjo Botsio and Adviser on African Affairs, Mr. George Padmore. Nnamdi Azikiwe used the occasion, at the eastern house of assembly, to give a speech honoring Prime Minister Nkrumah and recalled how Kwame has been dedicated to the African course.

On 1 October 1959, Azikiwe was succeeded by Michael Okpara as the premier of eastern region. On 28 October 1959, Governor general Robertson announced the dissolution of 184-member Federal House of Representatives with effect from 1 November 1959, so that independence election would be held.

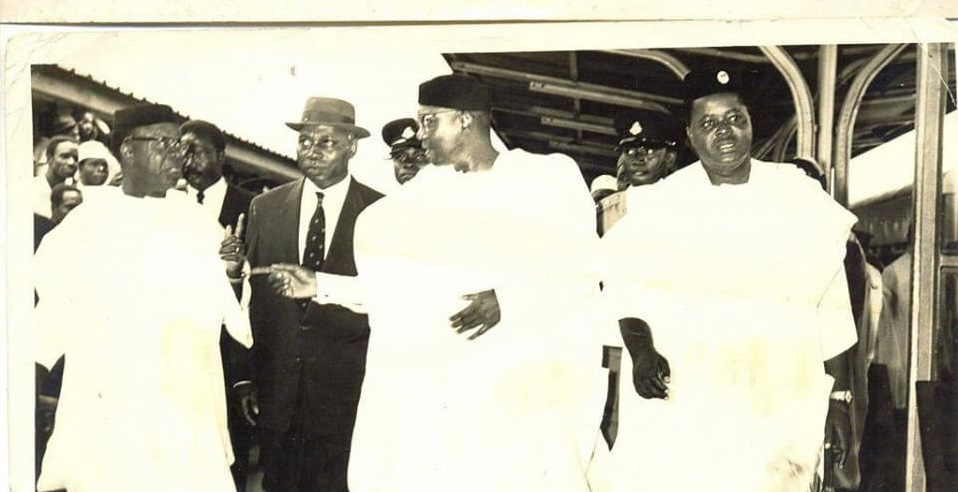
Azikiwe, Akpabio and the new premier, Okpara in Enugu, c.1959

On 12 December 1959, parliamentary elections were held in Nigeria to contest for 312 seats in the House of Representatives. Azikiwe's National Council of Nigeria and Cameroon (NCNC) came first with 2,594,577 votes and 89 seats.

Awolowo's Action Group (AG), came 2nd with 1,992, 364 votes and 75 seats. Tafawa Balewa's Northern People's Congress (NPC) came 3rd with 1,922,179 and 148 of the 312 seats in the House of Representatives.

The three major political parties in the election could not get enough seats to form a government. Governor General Robertson called on Tafawa Balewa to form a government. On 16 December, Ahmadu Bello and Tafawa Balewa tried to reach a compromise on a possible coalition government between NPC and NCNC. Governor General was informed about the partnership, hence he approved a sixteen-member cabinet proposed by Balewa.

== Nigeria Independence ==
Flag of the Colony and Protectorate of Nigeria (1914–1960)

New flag of Nigeria, designed by Michael Akinwunmi (1960)

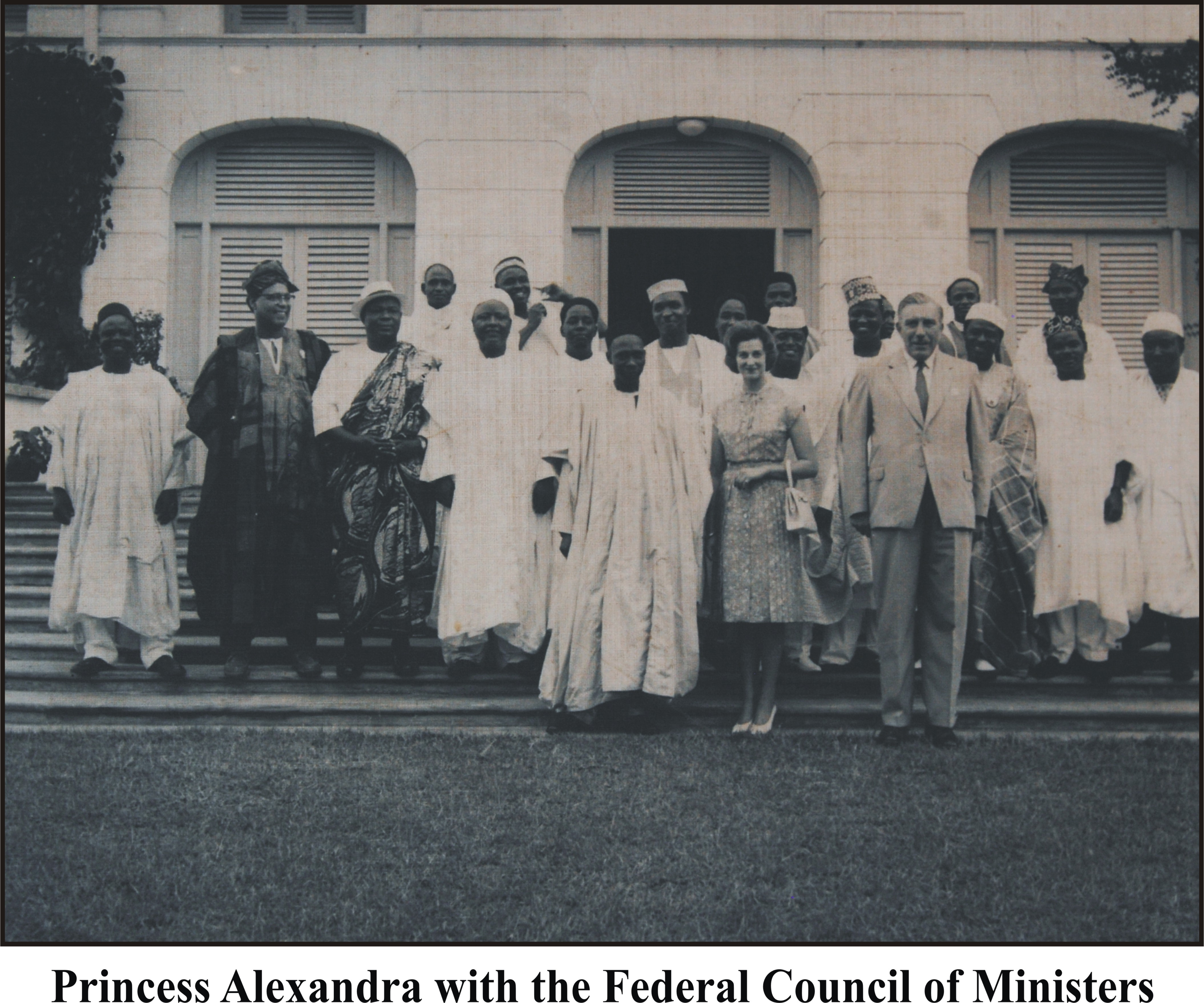
Princess Alexandra with the Federal Council of Ministers, 1960

On 29 July 1960, the United Kingdom parliament passed the Nigerian Independence Act, 1960, which provided for independent Nigeria. At the night of 30 September 1960 the British Union Jack was lowered in a celebration ceremony attended by dignitaries. On 3 October 1960, Princess Alexandra who represented the Queen, opened the country's first Parliament. A new constitution, establishing a federal system with an elected prime minister and a ceremonial head of state was created. The coalition government of NCNC and NPC was in power when Nigeria attained independence in 1960 with Sir Tafawa Balewa as Prime Minister and Dr. Nnamdi Azikiwe as Senate President.

Soon after, Azikiwe succeeded Sir James Robertson as the first indigenous Governor-General. However, under the Independent Constitution of Nigeria, the governor-general was only a ceremonial head of state. The positions of Governor-General and membership of the Queen's Privy Council placed Azikiwe above party politics. Nigeria's first indigenous Executive Cabinet of Tafawa Balewa included; M Johnson, Bukar Dipcharima, Ayo Rosiji, Aja Wachukwu, Kolawole Balogun, and Victor Mukete (Cameroon), Samuel Akintola, Raymond Njoku, Alhaji Ribadu, Kingsley O. Mbadiwe, Festus Okotie-Eboh, and Allaji Inua Wada.

Sir Tafawa Balewa delivered a speech at Race Course (now Tafawa Balewa Square) in Lagos at the Independence Ceremony. In his speech he said, "Today's ceremony marks the culmination of a process which began fifteen years ago and has now reached a happy and successful conclusion. It is with justifiable pride that we claim the achievement of our Independence to be unparalleled in the annals of history. Each step of our constitutional advance has been purposefully and peacefully planned with full and open consultation, not only between representatives of all the various interests in Nigeria but in harmonious cooperation with the administering power which has today relinquished its authority."

== Governor General of Nigeria ==
As a young man I saw visions: visions of Nigeria becoming a great country in the emerging continent of Africa; visions of Nigeria offering freedom to those in bondage, and securing the democratic way of life to those who had been lulled into an illusion of security under colonial rule..I trust that I shall dream my dreams amid the peace and ever-increasing prosperity of the people of my native Nigeria. The motto of the independent federation of Nigeria is Unity and Faith. I pray that we may guard our unity and keep our faith.

— Nnamdi Azikiwe (summer 1960, London)

Azikiwe was recommended as the successor to Sir James Robertson, by the British Prime Minister Harold Macmillan, during his visit to Lagos in early 1960. The post of Governor-General of the federation in titular terms made him the representative of the British Queen in Nigeria. Azikiwe's inauguration in November 1960, witnessed some of his colleagues in the Black Atlantic, some of them which includes Martin Luther King Jr, Langston Hughes, Nina Simone, Dr. Horace Mann Bond, Ralph Bunche, W.E.B. Du Bois, Shirley Graham Du Bois, Amy Jacques Garvey, and George S. Schuyler. Martin Luther King Jr. remarked that the liberation struggles in Nigeria and in other African nations were having a profound impact on the American civil rights movement, noting that Azikiwe and other African leaders were "popular heroes on most Negro college campuses. In Azikiwe's inaugural speech, he commented on "the need to revive the stature of man in Africa and restore the dignity of man in the world."

Towards the end of his address, Zik said, "those of us, who may be rightly described as the makers of contemporary Nigeria, have ushered freedom into our country and preserved our unity as a nation", which "history has assigned to me an important part to play in order that this unity may have lasting effects and to bring home to our people the need to maintain it religiously." He also said "I shall not have consideration for personal comforts or even safety or even life itself, if these are the price I must pay for leadership in order to preserve the freedom and unity of my country."

Azikiwe attended the First International Labour Organization (ILO) African Regional Conference, that was held in Lagos, Nigeria in December 1960. In attendance were: Mr. Johnson, Labour Minister of Nigeria and Chairperson of the Conference, Mr. Demby, Labour Minister of Sierra Leone, and David A Morse, ILO Director-General. In December 1961 the American Society of African Culture (AMSAC) organised a large music festival in Lagos, Nigeria. American celebrities such as Nina Simone, Langston Hughes, and Lionel Hampton went on AMSAC's fully sponsored trip to strengthen African-American/African connections. They were welcomed by Azikiwe in Lagos.

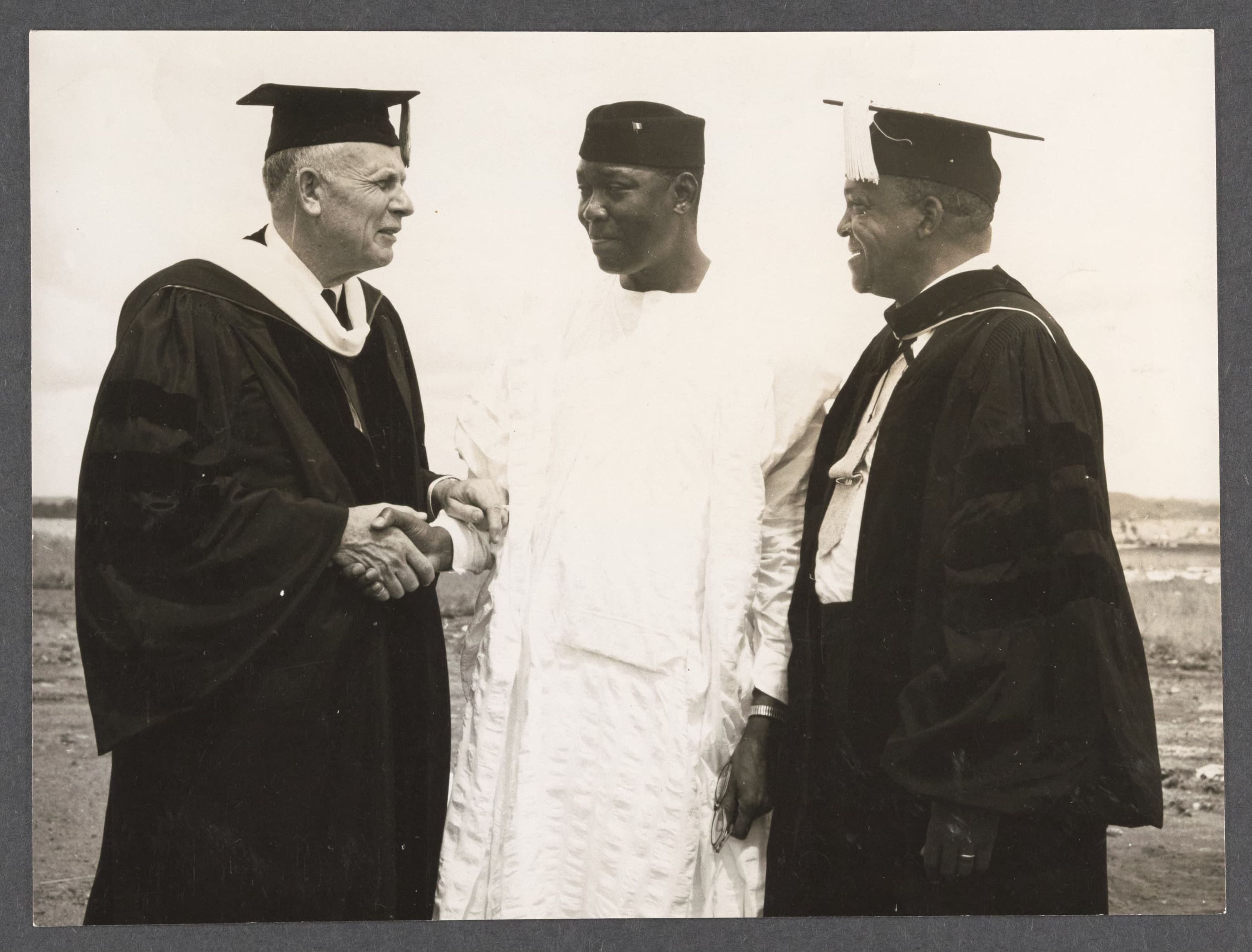
Azikiwe with Dr. John A. Hannah (left) and Dr. George Johnson (right) on the campus of University of Nigeria, 1961

On 17 November 1961, in a speech at the University of Nigeria in Nsukka, Zik made public his proposal for Nigeria to adopt a republican constitution while remaining a member of the Commonwealth. In 1962, Azikiwe urged African leaders in a Lagos conference, to create an organization of African states. The Lagos Conference drafted a proposed charter for an "Inter-African and Malagasy Organization" under Azikiwe's chairmanship. It was later adopted in May 1963 by the Organisation of African Unity.

In 1963, Azikiwe commissioned the first brewery plant built by Guinness outside of Ireland and Great Britain in Lagos.

== Presidency (1963–1966) ==
Seal of the President of the Federal Republic of Nigeria

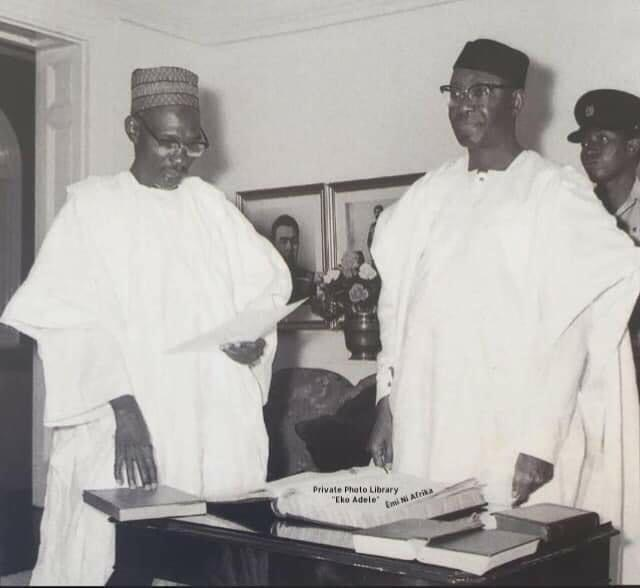
President Azikiwe administering the oath of office to the prime minister and cabinet ministers, 1964

The Federal Republic of Nigeria was established on 1 October 1963, with Abubakar Tafawa Balewa as prime minister (head of government) and Benjamin Nnamdi Azikiwe as president (head of state) and commander in chief of Armed forces. Prime Minister Tafawa Balewa proposed an amendment of the 1960 independence constitution to transform Azikiwe from Governor-General and redesignate his title as a ceremonial President. Balewa suggested that Azikiwe be named president in the 1963 constitution because Nigeria can never adequately reward Dr. Azikiwe for his nationalist activities and service to the nation. Therefore, section 157 of Nigeria's 1963 constitution was titled Nnamdi Azikiwe to be president, and read "Nnamdi Azikiwe shall be deemed to be elected President of the Republic on the date of the commencement of this Constitution."

On 30 December 1964, Nigeria's first federal election since independence was held. The election was postponed for several weeks because of discrepancies between the number of names on voting rolls and on census returns. Six months after the election, an estimated 2,000 people died in violence that erupted in the Western Region.

=== 1964 crisis and coup ===
Nigerian Daily Express reported on 3 March 1964, "On attainment of Independence in 1960, our first attempt to ascertain the population of Nigeria was the census exercise in 1962. The then Chairman of the Census Commission was J. J. Warren. The result of the census showed that Northern Nigeria was half a million less in population than the South. The Prime Minister, Abubakar Tafawa Balewa rejected the result sacked Mr. Warren and had him deported. The Prime Minister proceeded to order a recount in 1963. After due manipulation, the result of the census showed that the North was under counted by 8.5 million during the 1962 exercise which put the national population at 60.5million. The federal government under the Prime Minister scaled above the figure to 65.66 million. They scaled down the population of the North from 31 million to 29.8 million and allotted 28.8 million. The then Premiers, Ladoke Akintola, Michael Okpara and Dennis Osadebay of the West, East and Mid Western Region protested." The controversial federal election of December 1964 caused a massive crisis and ruptured the coalition government of the NPC and the NCNC. The elections were marred by widespread boycotts, rigging, intimidation, arson and violence which left Azikiwe so aghast that he refused to call Prime Minister Balewa to form a new government. For a few days, apocalyptic tension hung over the country until Azikiwe's sense of constitutional propriety prevailed.

== Personal life ==
Azikiwe married his first wife Flora Azikiwe on 4 April 1936 in Accra, Gold Coast when editor of the African Morning Post. They had four children together, a daughter and three sons.

In 1973 Azikiwe married his second wife Uche Azikiwe when she was 26. They had two children.

== Post presidency and final years ==
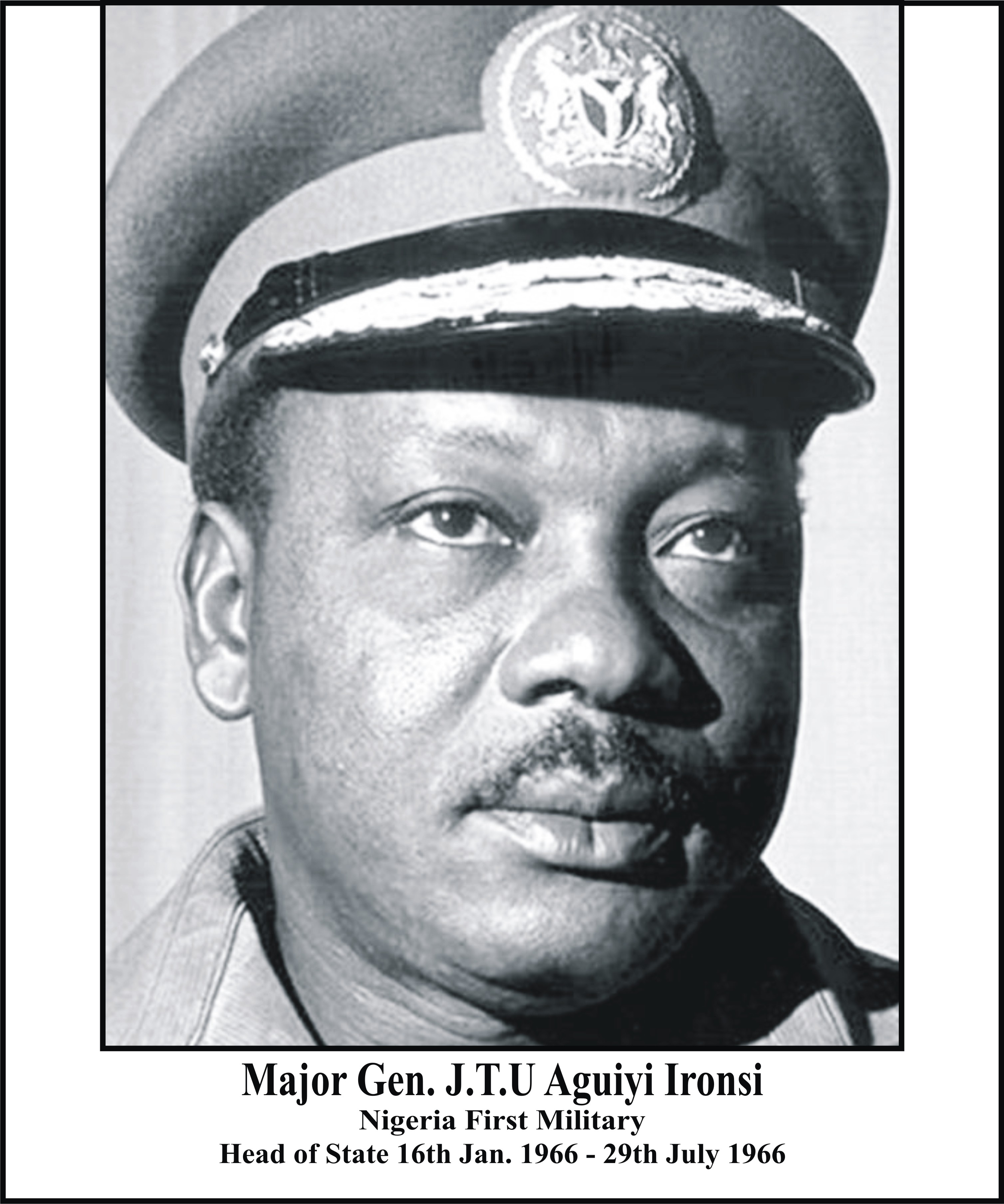
Ironsi, as the most senior officer, succeeded Azikiwe as first military head of state

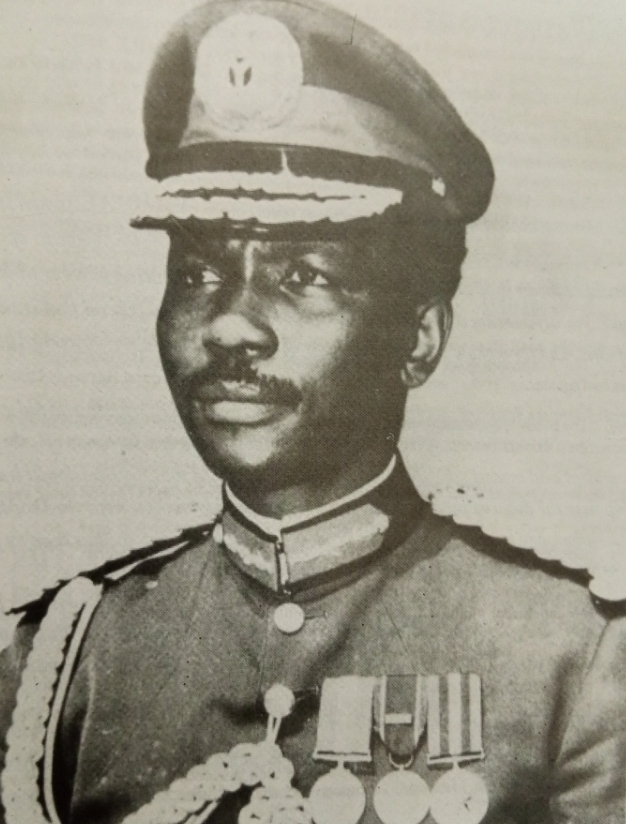
Yakubu Gowon was chosen to succeed Ironsi after the military counter coup.

The Nigerian government abolished the four federal regions on 24 May 1966. Some eastern ethnic groups about 115 individuals were killed in political violence on 28 May-2 June 1966. Major General Johnson Aguiyi-Ironsi was deposed and killed by Theophilus Danjuma, in a military coup led by Lt. Colonel Murtala Muhammed on 29 July 1966. Some 30 individuals were killed in political violence in Lagos on 29 July-1 August 1966, and some 250,000 eastern ethnic groups fled from the Northern Region to the Eastern Region following the military coup. Lt. Colonel Yakubu Gowon was sworn in as the head of the federal military government following the military coup, and he restored the four federal regions on 31 August 1966. Some 2,000 ethnic Igbos were killed in political violence in the Northern Region from 29 September to 4 October 1966. Lt. Colonel Chukwuemeka Odumegwu Ojukwu, military governor of the Eastern Region of Nigeria, declared that the region would no longer recognize Gowon as head of the federal military government on 2 March 1967. Lt. Colonel Gowon assumed full powers as commander-in-chief of the armed forces and head of the military government on 27 May 1967. Gowon proclaimed a state-of-emergency on 28 May 1967. Ojukwu declared the independence of the Republic of Biafra in southern Nigeria on 30 May 1967 after the federal government did not honor the Aburi Accord.

Independent State of Biafra, 1967

Violence has never been an instrument used by us, as founding fathers of the Nigerian Republic, to solve political problems. In the British tradition, we talked the Colonial Office into accepting our challenges for the demerits and merits of our case for self-government. After six constitutional conferences in 1953, 1954, 1957, 1958, 1959, and 1960, Great Britain conceded to us the right to assert our political independence as from October 1, 1960. None of the Nigerian political parties ever adopted violent means to gain our political freedom and we are happy to claim that not a drop of British or Nigerian blood was shed in the course of our national struggle for our place in the sun. This historical fact enabled me to state publicly in Nigeria that Her Majesty's Government has presented self-government to us on a platter of gold. Of course, my contemporaries scorned at me, but the facts of history are irrefutable. I consider it most unfortunate that our 'Young Turks' decided to introduce the element of violent revolution into Nigerian politics. No matter how they and our general public might have been provoked by obstinate and perhaps grasping politicians, it is an unwise policy. I have contacted General Aguiyi-Ironsi, General Officer Commanding the Nigerian armed forces, who I understand, has now assumed the reins of the Federal Government. I offered my services for any peace overtures to stop further bloodshed, to placate the mutinous officers, and to restore law and order. As soon as I hear from him, I shall make arrangements to return home. As far as I am concerned, I regard the killings of our political and military leaders as a national calamity.

— President Nnamdi Azikiwe's reaction to the first Military Coup, 1966.

Azikiwe initially supported Biafra and its international recognition. He used his political influence to lead Biafra delegation abroad for recognition of the independent state. By 1968, having seen the consequences the war had, he appealed unsuccessfully to Ojukwu to finally negotiate with Gowon. Azikiwe stayed away from politics after the war. He was chancellor of the University of Lagos from 1972 to 1976. Cessation of the military rule and ceding of power to democratic rule in 1979 gave Azikiwe a chance for a political comeback. He joined the Nigerian People's Party in 1978, making unsuccessful bids for the presidency in 1979 and 1983. He left politics permanently after the 1983 military coup led by Muhammadu Buhari.

=== Final years ===
On 8 November 1989, news media falsely announced Azikiwe's death as a result of enquiries from a BBC correspondent about his condition. He eventually resurfaced saying "I am not in a hurry to leave this world, because it is the only planet I know." In 1991, Azikiwe went to the launching of Nnamdi Azikiwe Centre in Zungeru, his place of birth, by President Ibrahim Babangida. In the summer of 1995, he granted an interview at Lincoln university, Pennsylvania with the Director of Public Relations of the university.

Azikiwe eventually died on 11 May 1996, at the University of Nigeria Teaching Hospital in Enugu after a prolonged illness. He was 91. Azikiwe was given a state funeral by the government of Sani Abacha, following nearly two weeks of national ceremonies. His body taken to various important cities in the country for mourning and tributes. He was finally buried in his native Onitsha on 16 November 1996, on what would have become his 92nd birthday. At Azikiwe's death, The New York Times remarked,

"He towered over the affairs of Africa's most populous nation, attaining the rare status of a truly national hero who came to be admired across the regional and ethnic lines dividing his country."

In 2019, the administration of President Muhammadu Buhari undertook the completion of Dr Nnamdi Azikiwe Mausoluem and was declared a National monument.

== Historical reputation and legacy ==
During the 19th century, the scramble for Africa witnessed European powers having Africa divided, human and natural resources exploited. The development of African political ideology emerged with the intent to search for an ideological project of self- affirmation and assertive cultural nationalism. Among the proponents of Pan Africanism were Nnamdi Azikiwe, the Pilot of Nigerian Independence. Azikiwe's place in Nigeria's cosmology goes far beyond the positions he held. He gave nationalism and the independence struggle a new meaning. Zik, then in Hope Waddel Institute, was conversant with the ideas of Marcus Garvey on Pan Africanism, emphasizing the empowerment of Africans, and the redemption of Africa by Africans. This made Zik question the legitimacy of Colonialism in Africa, and was inspired by Garvey's call for the liberation of Africa from the colonial governments. At a time when Nigeria was still a collection of disparate regions, identities and local units, Zik started canvassing for Nigerian independence and for the creation of a de-ethnicised, de-tribalised sense of Nigerian nationalism and patriotism.

Azikiwe went to the US where he studied and taught at various segregated universities in the South, experiencing the atmosphere of discrimination and the upsurge of radical 'Negro' resistance. He was also inspired by the 19th century US president, James A Garfield on grass to grace political ascendancy. On returning to West Africa, his primary concern was, therefore, not a territorial, nationalist struggle, but a universal, world-wide struggle for the black race. As editor of the African Morning Post in Accra, from 1935 to 1937, Azikiwe immediately established a reputation because of his direct 'American style' journalism and bold criticism of the colonial system, of colonial officials as well as of local African leaders. His influence extended throughout British colonial territories and he was the motivating force of some African leaders like Kwame Nkrumah, Julius Nyerere, Dauda Jawara, Kenneth Kaunda and Milton Obote among others.

Azikiwe's combative and provocative journalism was the principal source of his fame and power, and the most crucial single precipitant of Nigerian awakening. Azikiwe founded a media outfit called Zik Group, under which he established and edited West African Pilot, which was referred to as "a fire-eating and aggressive nationalist paper of the highest order." Under Zik Group he revolutionised the West African newspaper industry, demonstrating that English-language journalism could be successful, and expanded his controlling interest to over 12 daily, African-run newspapers. West African Pilot grew exponentially from an initial run of 6,000 copies daily, to printing over 20,000 copies at its peak in 1950s.

The personal documents of Nnamdi Azikiwe, the first president of Nigeria, are currently held in his family home's personal library in Nsukka, Nigeria. Among these personal papers are a draft of his memoirs, state papers from his presidency, political papers related the Republic of Biafra, materials from Azikiwe's 1979 and 1983 presidential campaigns, as well as a few rare books and newspapers. Funded by the Modern Endangered Archives Program at the UCLA library, Vanderbilt University digitized these materials to create a collection of primary materials related to the study of both Nigeria and Biafra. This collection is available digitally through the UCLA library.

=== Honors ===
- : Member of the Privy Council of the United Kingdom, 16 November 1960.
- Grand Commander of the Order of the Federal Republic (GCFR).

=== Honorary degrees ===
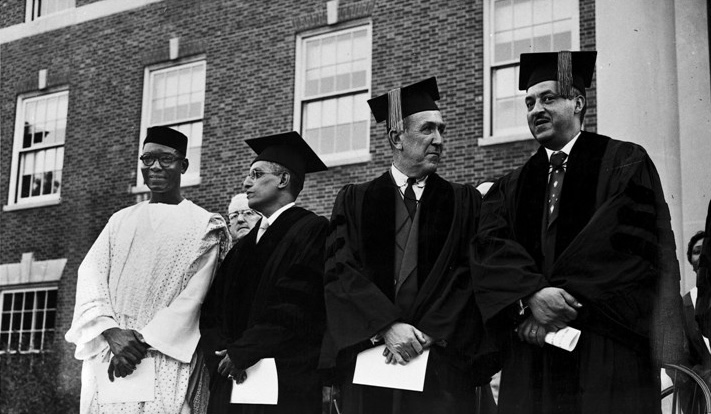
Azikiwe with Thurgood Marshall, Chester Bowles and Roy Williston Bornn receiving their honorary degree at 1954 Howard University commencement

Azikiwe was awarded 14 honorary degrees from Nigerian, American and Liberian universities, notably:

- (Pennsylvania) 1946: Doctor of Law by Lincoln University
- (West Virginia) 1947: Doctor of Letters by Storer College
- (Washington, D.C.) 1950: Doctor of Law by Howard University
- 1959: Honorary Doctor of Law by the Michigan State University
- 1961: Honorary Doctor of Letters (D.Litt.) by the University of Nigeria
- 1969: Doctor of Law by the University of Liberia
- 1980: Honorary doctor of Humane Letters by the University of Pennsylvania

Others include degrees from University of Ibadan, University of Lagos, Ahmadu Bello University, UNIZIK, and FUTO.

=== Memorials and monuments ===
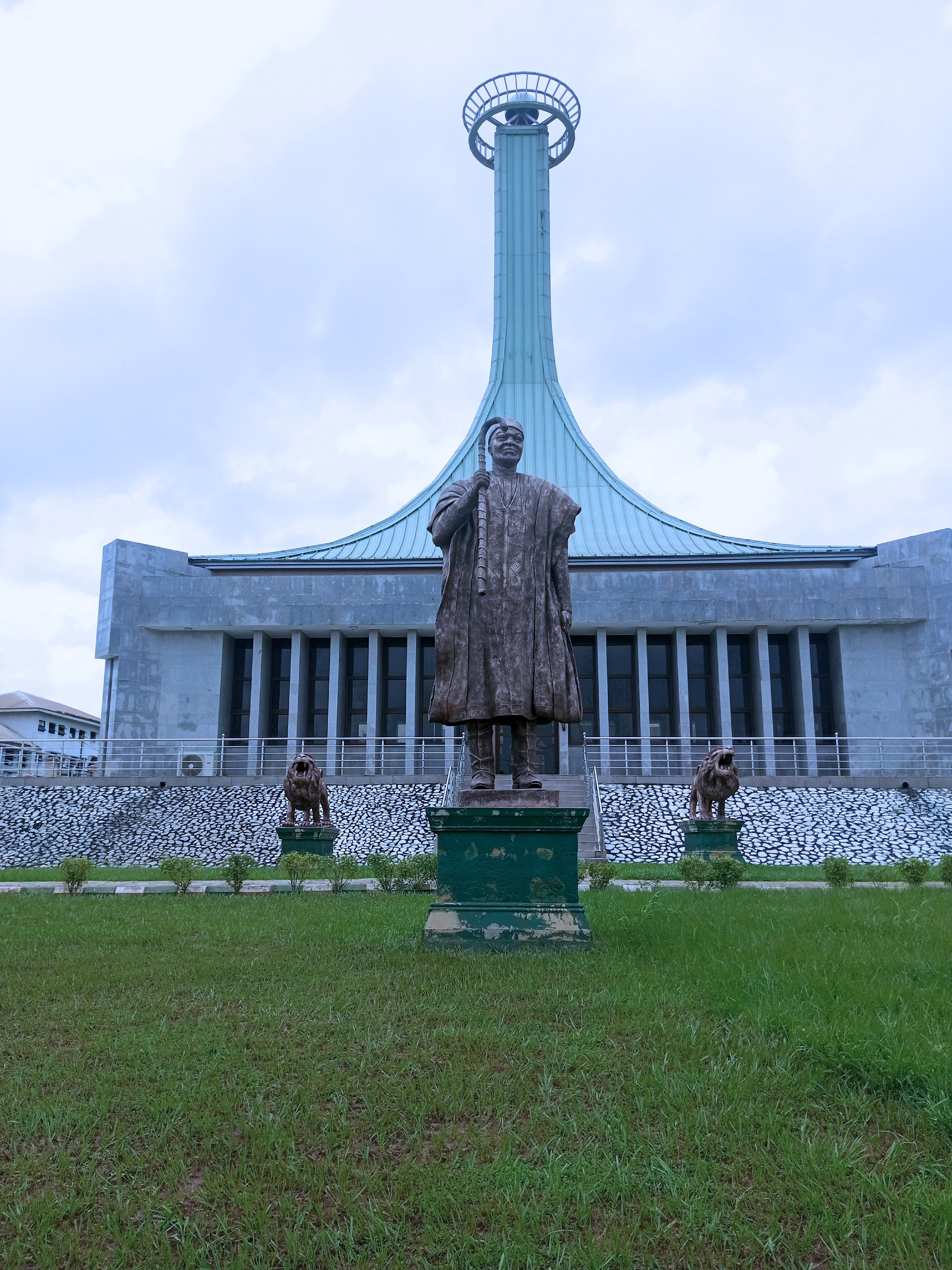
Nnamdi Azikiwe Mausoleum, Onitsha

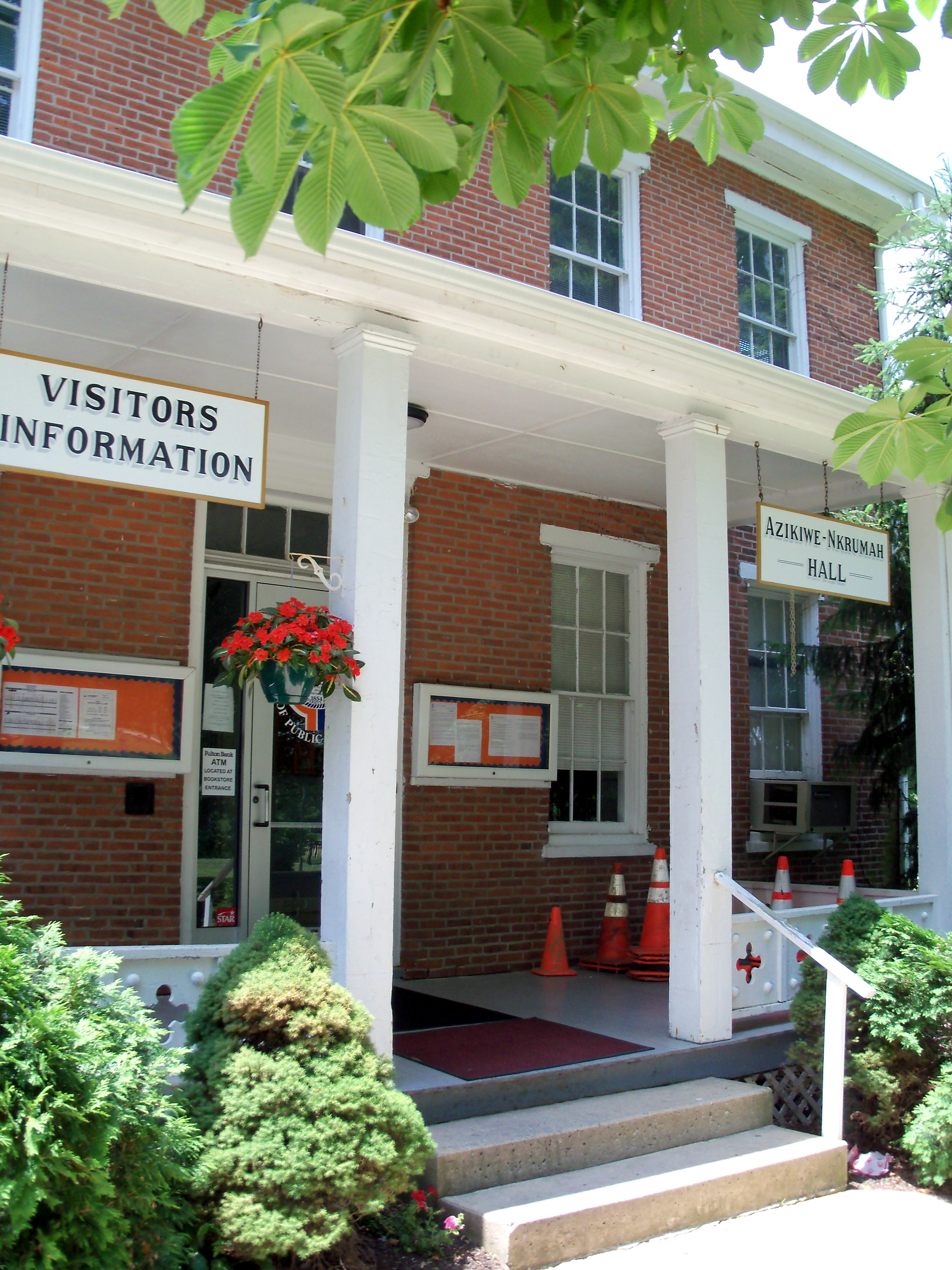
Azikiwe-Nkrumah Hall, Lincoln University

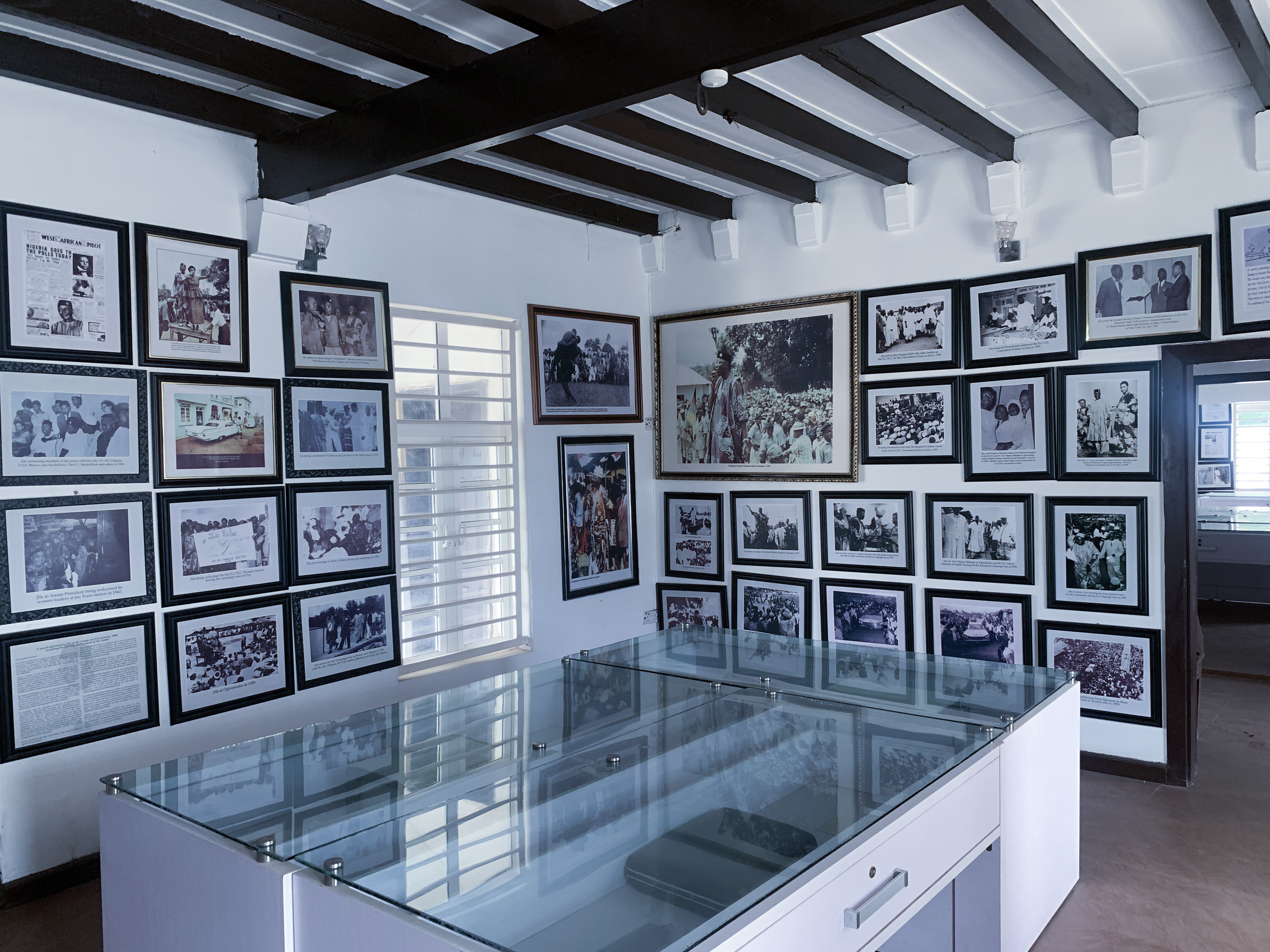
Inside View, Zik Centre, Enugu

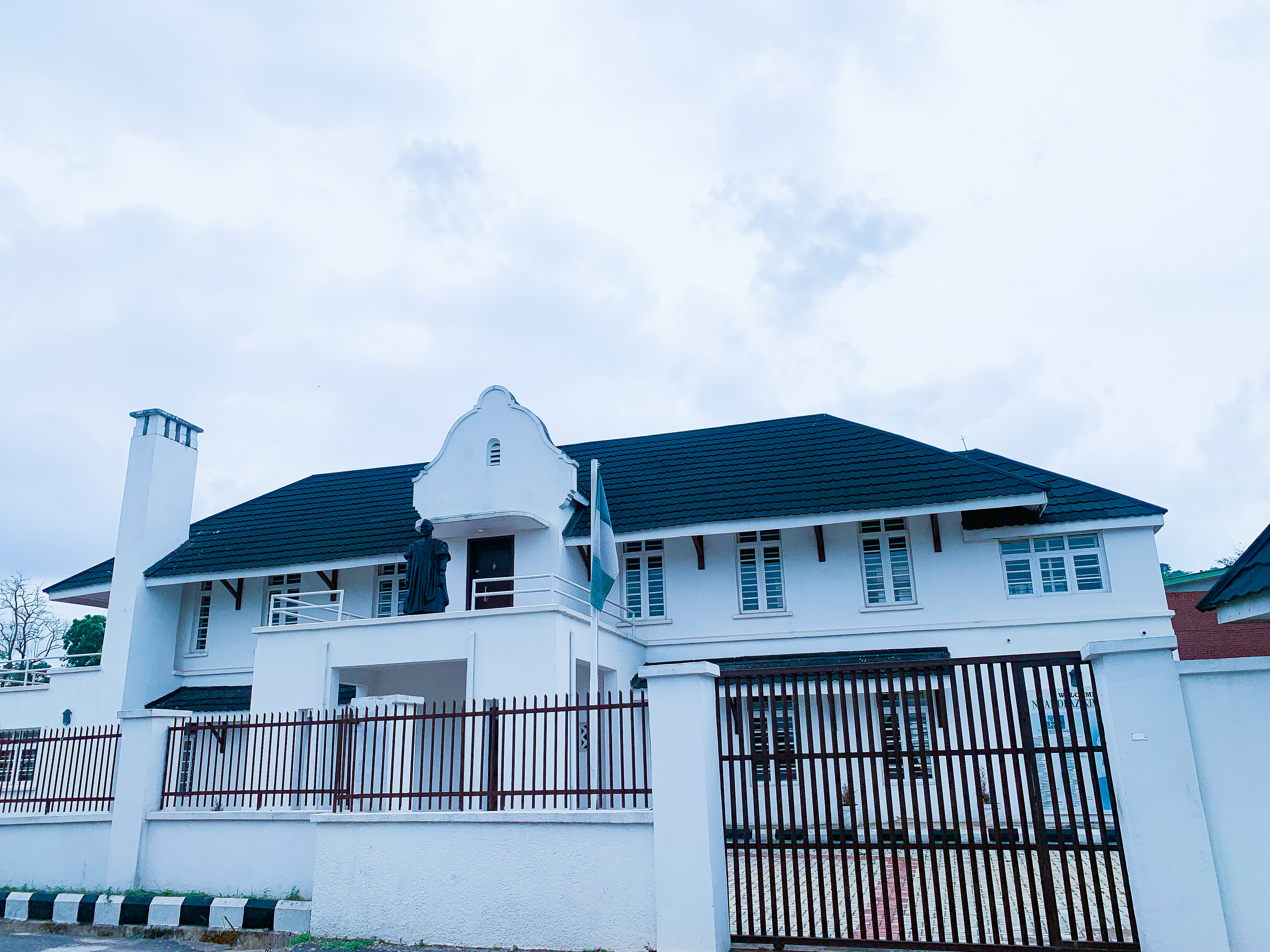
Outside View, Zik Center, Enugu

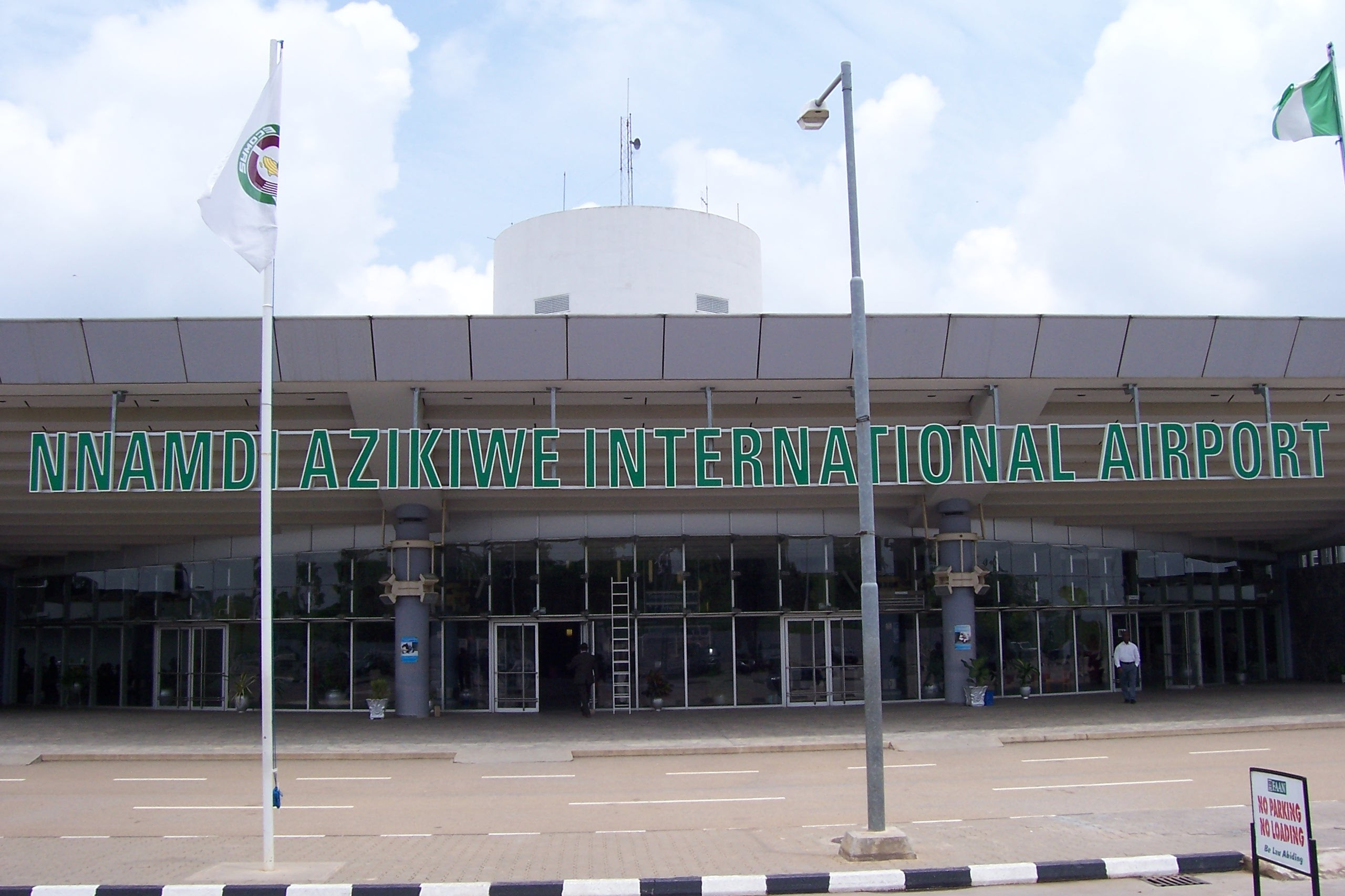
Nnamdi Azikiwe International Airport, Abuja

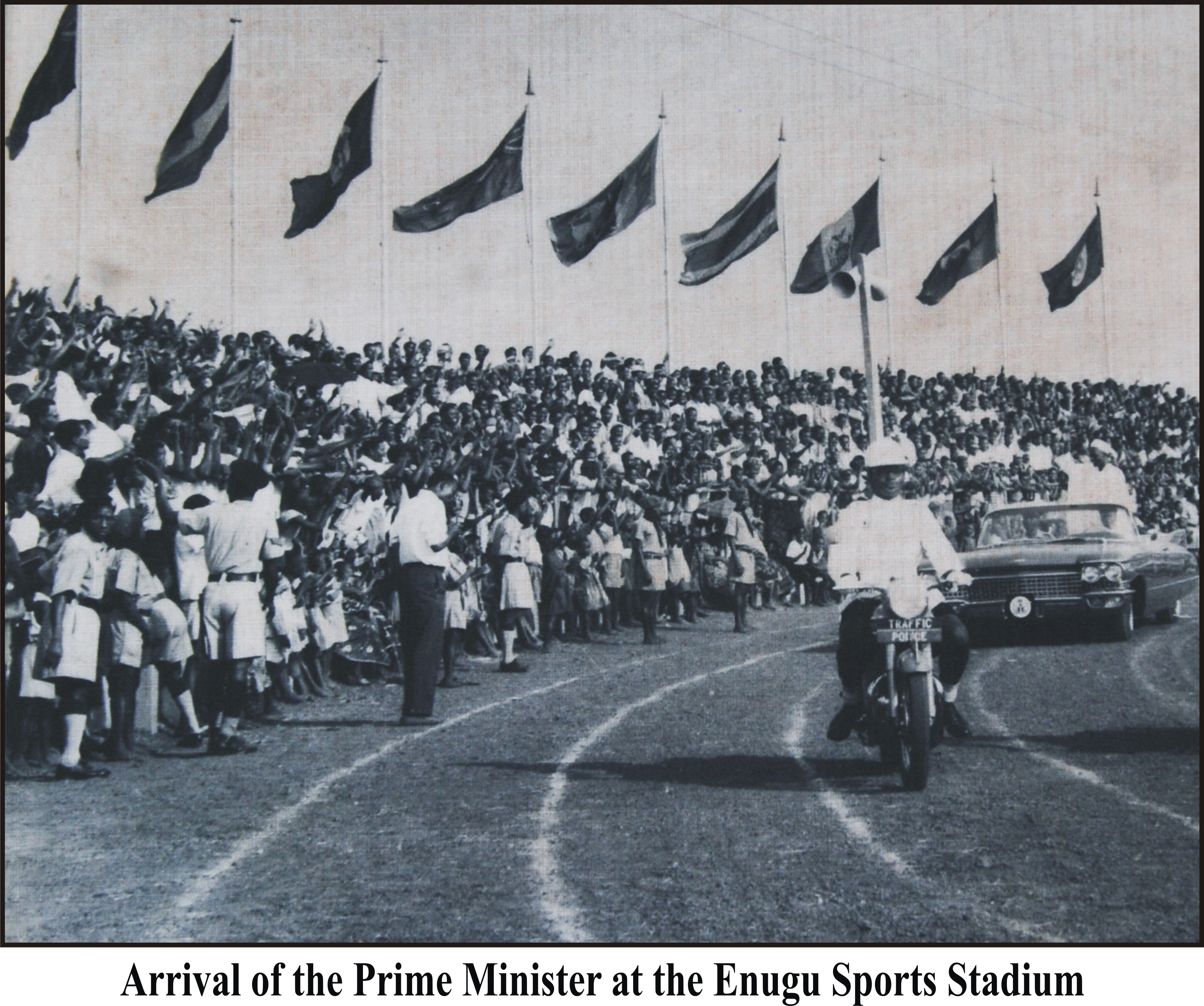
Nnamdi Azikiwe Stadium, Enugu

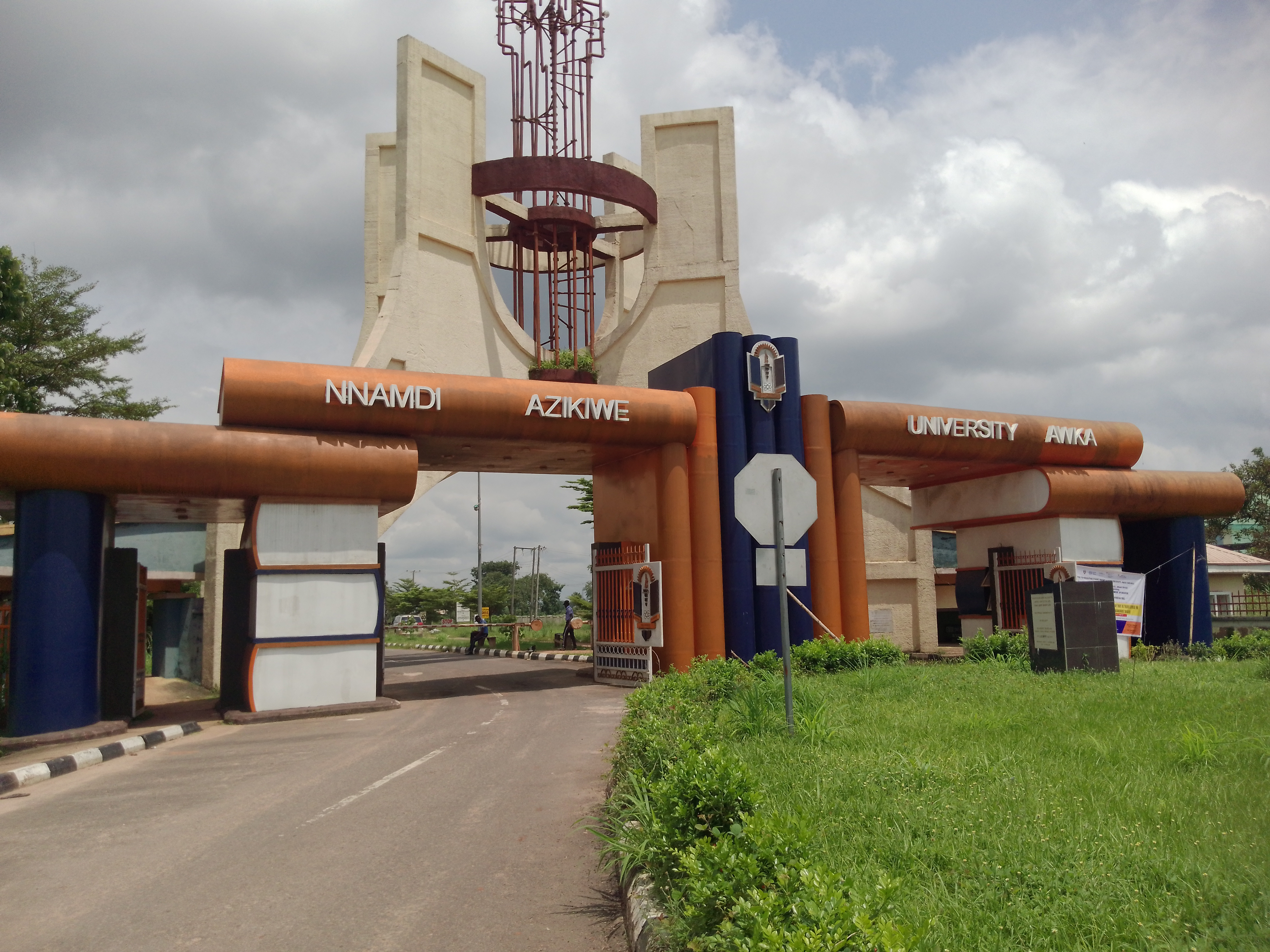
Nnamdi Azikiwe University, Awka

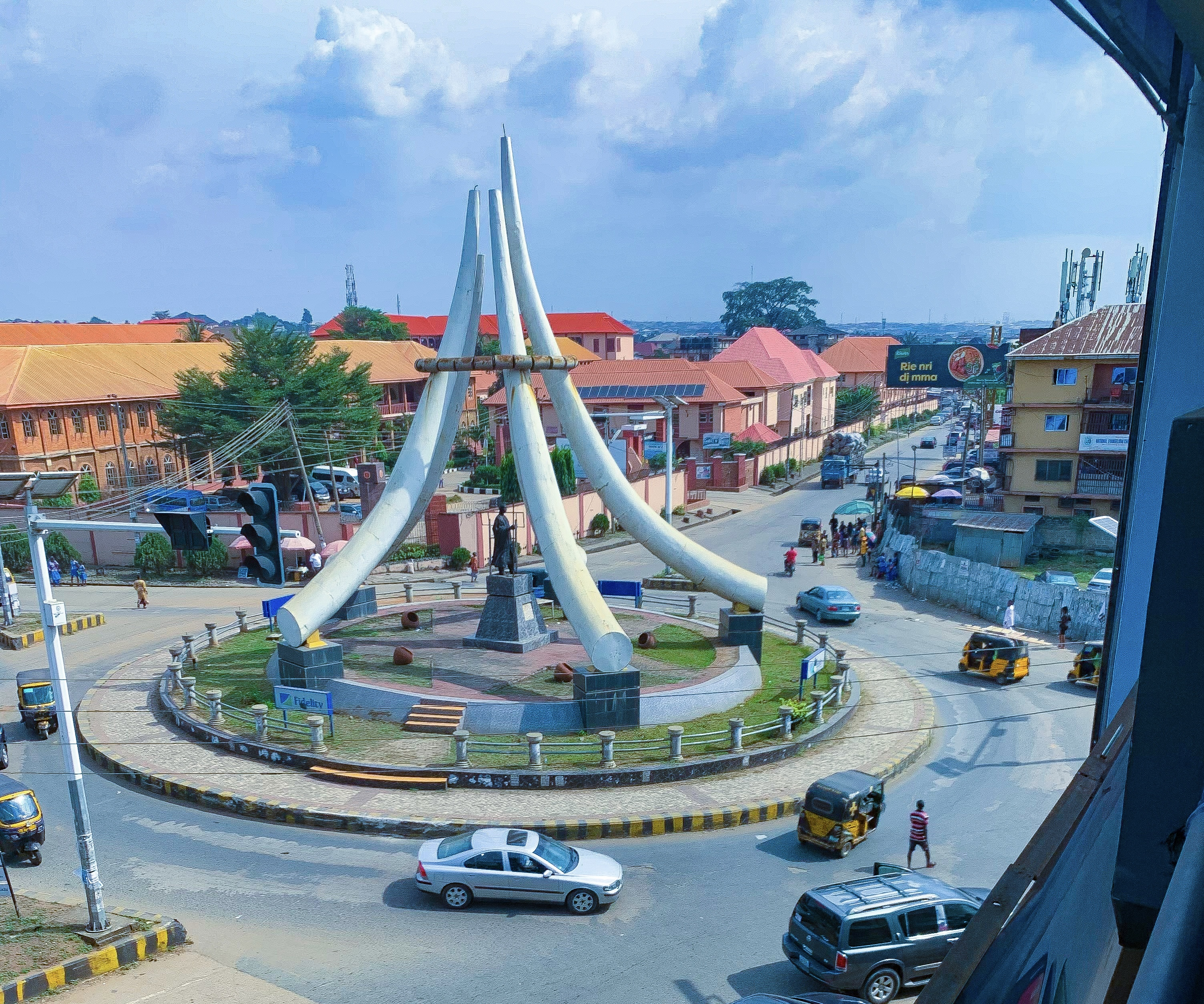
Azikiwe/DMGS Roundabout, Onitsha

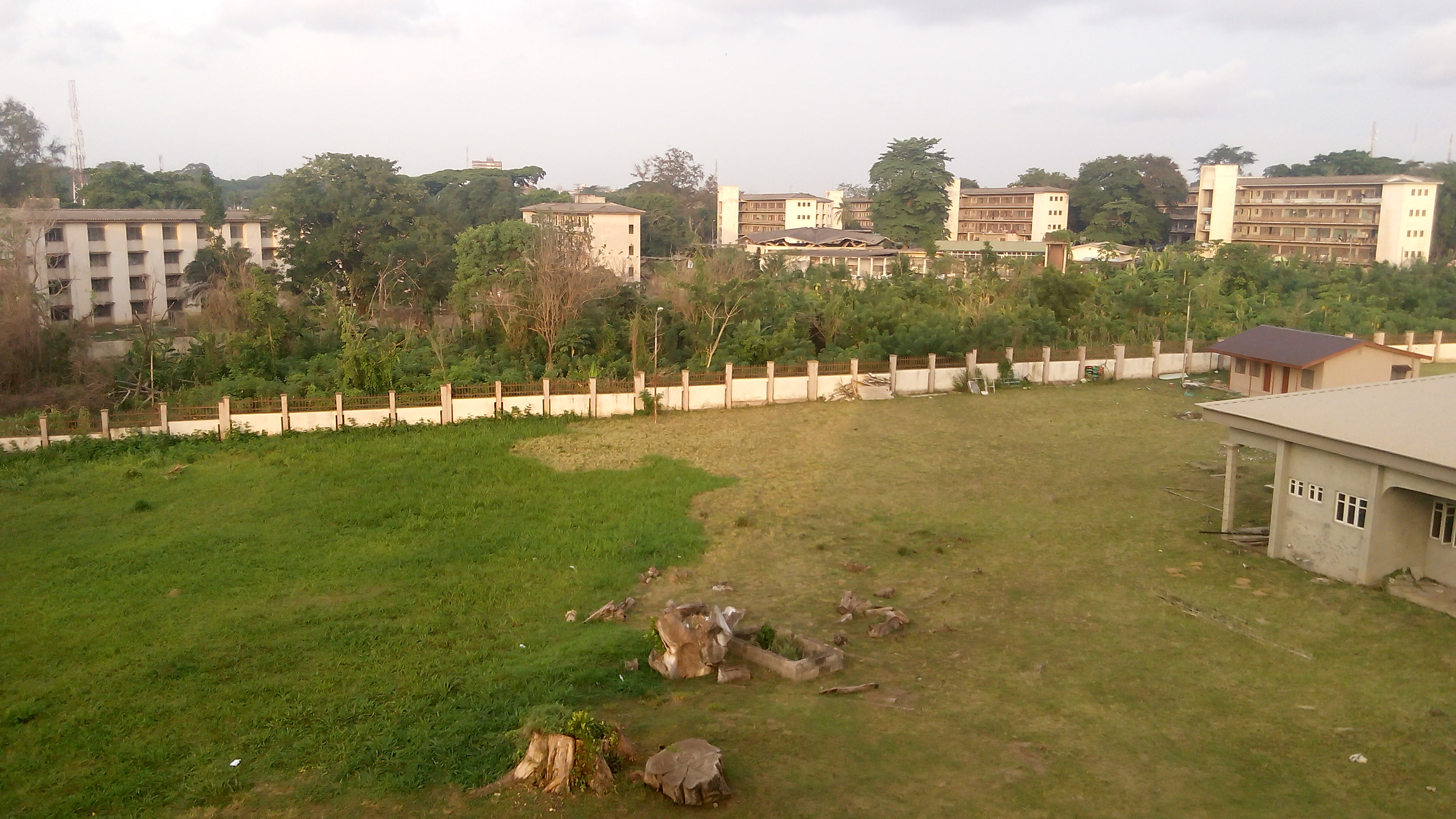
Nnamdi Azikiwe Hall, University of Ibadan

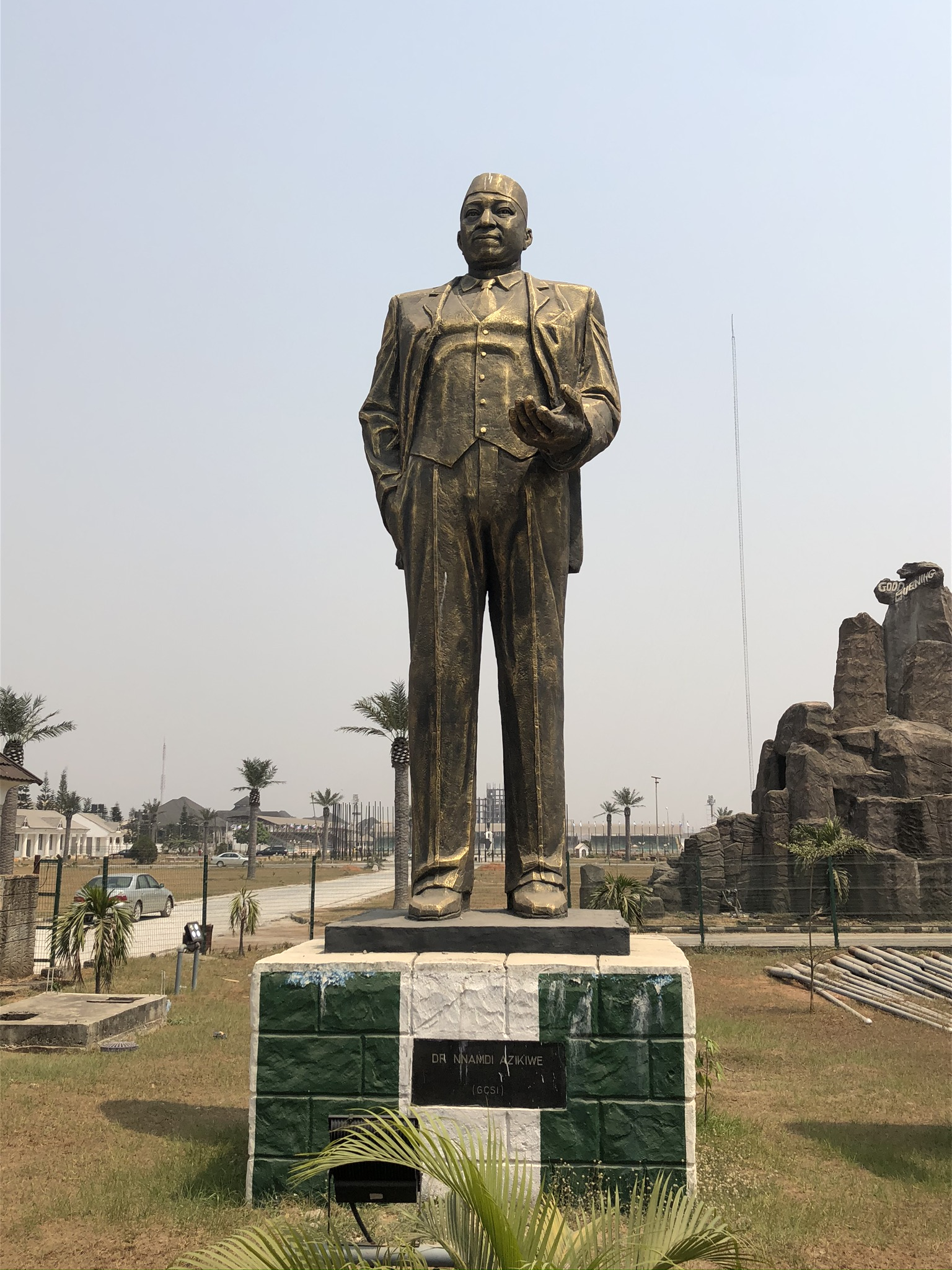
Nnamdi Azikiwe statue at the Heroes Square, Nigeria, in Imo State

=== Currency and postage stamps ===
Azikiwe's portrait has appeared on Nigeria's ₦500 banknote since 2001. His image was included in the postage stamps unveiled during the first anniversary of Federal Republic of Nigeria in 1964 and has since appeared in other stamps.

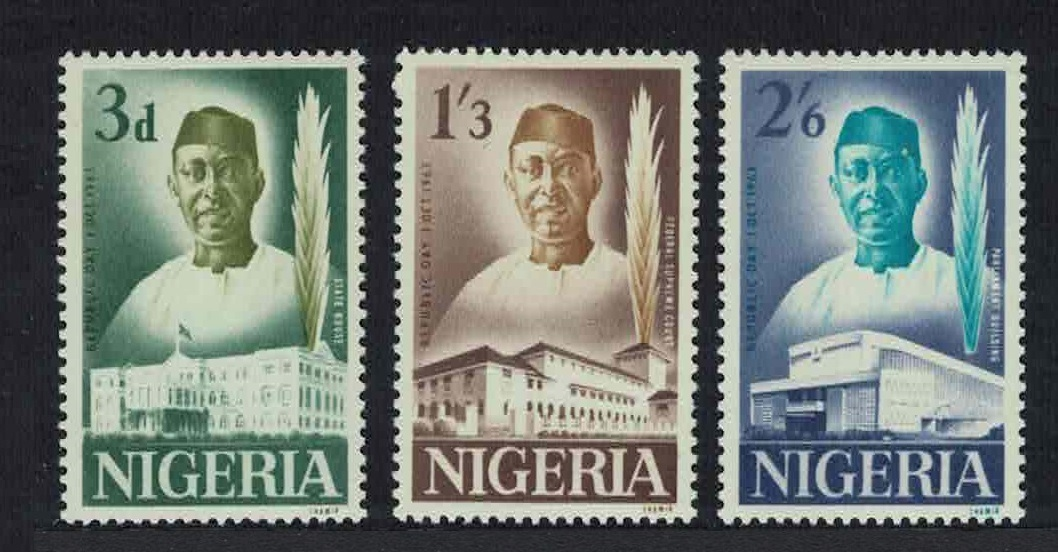
Azikiwe issue of 1964

=== In popular culture ===
The first biography of Azikiwe was authored by himself, published in 1970, titled My Odyssey: An Autobiography.

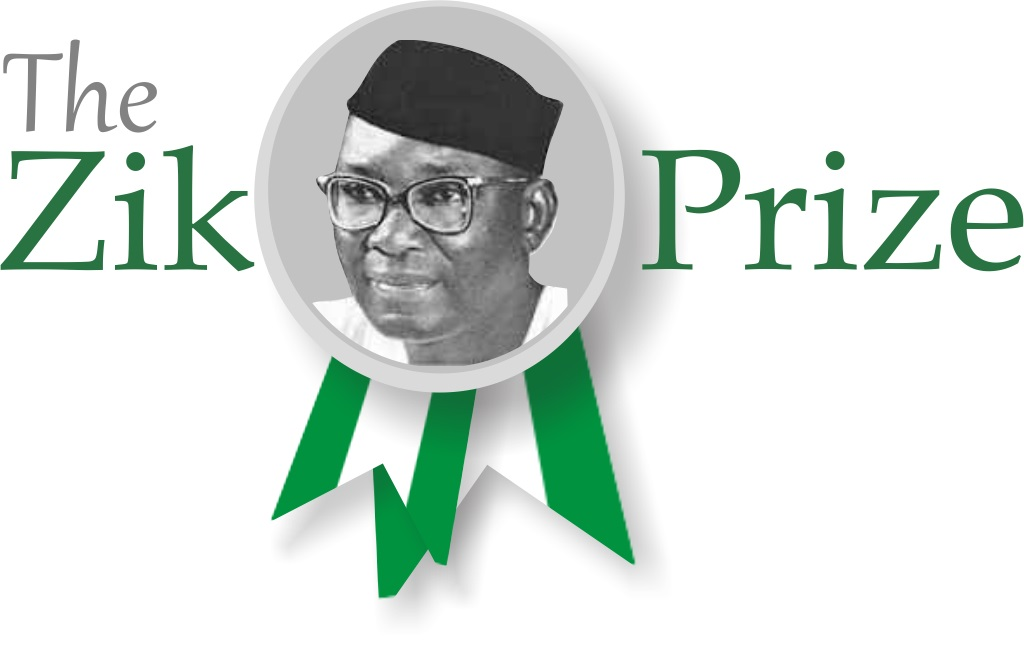
Zik Prize logo Nnamdi Azikiwe University Teaching Hospital, in Nnewi, Anambra State Nnamdi Azikiwe Library in Enugu State

The Federal Government of Nigeria established the Zik Prize, an annual leadership award, in 1995, in honor of Azikiwe.

In 2006, Ben Obi initiated the Zik Annual Lecture Series to immortalize the good works and legacies of Azikiwe.

Azikiwe's educational philosophy was portrayed in the University of Nigeria documentary film.

In 2023, Duke of Shomolu Foundation produced a play based on the life and times of Azikiwe.

Michigan State University created the 'Nnamdi Azikiwe International African Student Fellowship' in 2023, to support MSU international African students to Africa for research. The award was in honor of Azikiwe who partnered with MSU faculty to build a land-grant model university (University of Nigeria) in Eastern Nigeria.

=== Traditional honors ===
Azikiwe was inducted into the Agbalanze society of Onitsha as Nnanyelugo in 1946, a recognition for Onitsha men with significant accomplishments. In 1962, he became a second-rank red cap chieftain (Ndichie Okwa) as the Oziziani Obi. Chief Azikiwe was installed as the Owelle-Osowa-Anya of Onitsha in 1972, making him a first-rank hereditary red cap nobleman (Ndichie Ume) in the Igbo branch of the Nigerian chieftaincy system.

== Political ideologies ==
- Zikism; it is the most popular political ideology of Nnamdi Azikiwe, aimed at decolonizing the minds of young Africans. At a time, when African states were under the British hegemony, Zik developed his political philosophy as a reformist ideology. The five canons of Zikism are " Spiritual Balance", "Social Regeneration", "Economic Determinism", " Mental Emancipation", and "Political Resurgence." Throwing more light to the canons, Azikiwe highlighted, "First I coined the expression spiritual balance to connote the fundamental freedom of conscience, thought and opinion... Second, I constructed social regeneration to imply freedom of association and freedom from discrimination .. Thirdly, I ventured into the realm of economics, which I believed was the taproot of human society... I christened such a condition of life economic determinism, because I believed in Karl Marx's idea of the economic interpretation of history in the light of experience all over Africa... Fourthly, I decided to make a voyage into the realms of the intellect. ... Hence I proposed the thesis that mental emancipation was necessary for the mis-educated African to be re-educated and be politically renascent. Fifthly ... there could be no doubt about the inevitability of the political Risorgimento of the African, since the satisfaction of these conditions implies freedom to life, liberty, and the pursuit of happiness."
- Neo Welfarism; Azikiwe used indigenous African culture and indigenous pre colonial African economies to fashion out his Neo-Welfarist economic ideology, and he recommended eclecticism and pragmatism as the philosophical basis for neo-welfarism.
- Eclectic Pragmatism; Eclectic-pragmatism for Azikiwe is the most suitable method for dealing especially with the multi-faceted reality of economic and political matters. It is a method which attempts to harmonize apparently opposing views, not by resolving the contradictions, but by selecting and blending what is useful and practicable in each for the purpose of attaining the desired goals. Thus, eclectic pragmatism seems to be the most suitable method for dealing with African problems in view of the variegated and traumatic experience which precipitated them.

== Works ==
- Zik (1961)
- My Odyssey (1971)
- Renascent Africa (1973)
- Liberia in World Politics (1931)
- ——— (1966). One Hundred Quotable Quotes and Poems of the Rt. Hon. Dr. Nnamdi Azikiwe. Institute of Management and Technology. ISBN 978-2736-09-0.
- Political Blueprint for Nigeria (1943)
- Economic Reconstruction of Nigeria (1943)
- Zik: A Selection of the Speeches of Dr. Nnamdi Azikiwe (1961)
- Assassination Story: True or False? (1946)
- Before Us Lies the Open Grave (1947)
- The Future of Pan-Africanism (1961)
- The Realities of African Unity (1965)
- Origins of the Nigerian Civil War (1969)
- I Believe in One Nigeria (1969)
- Peace Proposals for Ending the Nigerian Civil War (1969)
- Dialogue on a New Capital for Nigeria (1974)
- Creation of More States in Nigeria, A Political Analysis (1974)
- Democracy with Military Vigilance (1974)
- Reorientation of Nigerian Ideologies: lecture on 9 December 1976, on the eve of the launching of the UNN Endowment Fund (1976)
- Our Struggle for Freedom; Onitsha Market Crisis (1976)
- Let Us Forgive Our Children. An appeal to the leaders and people of Onitsha during the market crisis (1976)
- A Collection of Poems (1977)
- Civil War Soliloquies: More Collection of Poems (1977)
- Themes in African Social and Political Thought (1978)
- Restoration of Nigerian Democracy (1978)
- Matchless Past Performance: My Reply to Chief Awolowo's Challenge (1979)
- A Matter of Conscience (1979)
- ——— (1980). Ideology for Nigeria: Capitalism, Socialism or Welfarism?. Macmillan Nigeria. p. 196. ISBN 9789781325212.
- ——— (1983). Breach of Trust by the NPN.
- ——— (1983). History Will Vindicate The Just.

== See also ==
- African nationalism
- Zikist philosophy
- Zik Prize

== Notes ==
- Orji, John (2013). "Chapter 2: The Triumph of Knowledge". In Chuku, Gloria (ed.). The Igbo Intellectual Tradition: Creative Conflict in African and African diasporic thought. Palgrave Macmillan. pp. 67–89.
- Tonkin, Elizabeth (1990). "Chapter 2: Zik's Story". In Chuku, P. F. de Moraes (ed.). SelfAssertion and Brokerage: Early Cultural Nationalism in West Africa. Birmingham University African Studies Series. pp. 35–45.
- Idemili, Samuel Okafor (1980). The West African Pilot and the Movement for Nigerian Nationalism, 1937–1960 (Thesis). University of Wisconsin-Madison.
- Olusanya, Gabriel (1964). The impact of the Second World War on Nigeria's political evolution (PhD Thesis). University of Toronto.

Political offices
Preceded by Position created	Senate President of Nigeria; 1960–1960	Succeeded by Dennis Osadebay
Preceded by James Wilson Robertson	Governor-General of Nigeria; 1960–1963	Succeeded by Position abolished
Preceded by Elizabeth II as Queen of Nigeria	President of Nigeria; 1963–1966	Succeeded by Johnson Aguiyi-Ironsi
