= Nnamdi Azikiwe Mausoleum =

Zik Mausoleum

Coordinates: 6°08′43″N 6°48′51″E

The Nnamdi Azikiwe Mausoleum, also known as The Zik Mausoleum and Zik’s Place, is a national monument located in Onitsha, Anambra State, Nigeria. The mausoleum serves as the burial site and the final resting place of Nigeria's first native governor-general and first president, Dr. Nnamdi Azikiwe.

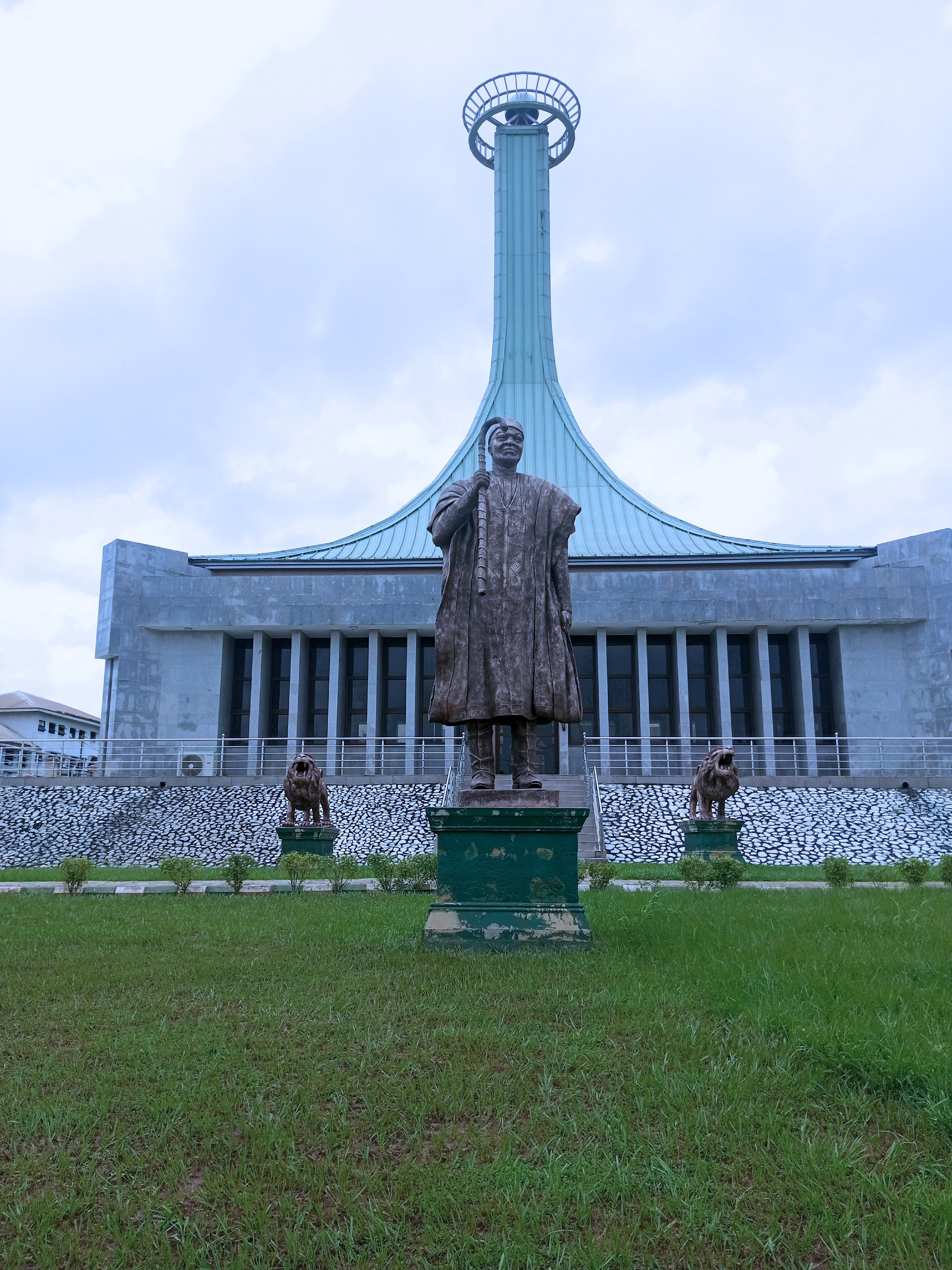
