= Chinua Achebe bibliography =

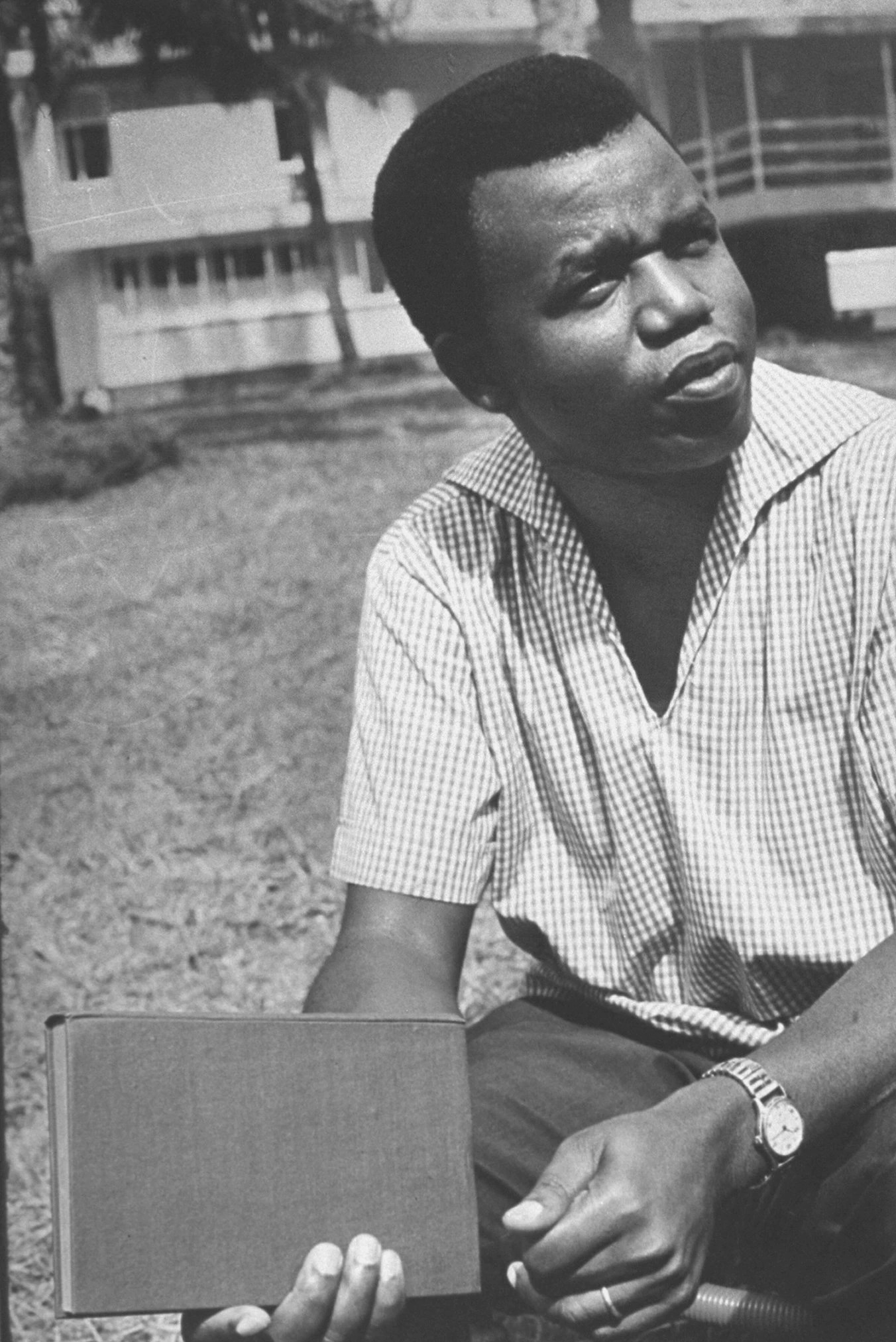
Achebe in Lagos, 1966

Nigerian author Chinua Achebe (1930–2013) was a major writer of post-colonial literature in the 20th century. He is best known for his debut novel, Things Fall Apart, which has been used in school curricula. Achebe has been regarded as the "father of modern African literature", especially and firstly by South African writer Nadine Gordimer.

Achebe wrote five novels, four children's books, two short story collections and two poetry books, four essay collections, a political treatise, and a memoir.

== Novels ==
- Things Fall Apart (1958). London: Heinemann African Writers Series, No. 1; New York: Astor-Honor, 1959. OCLC 10730671
- No Longer at Ease (1960). London: Heinemann African Writers Series, No. 3; New York: Obolensky, 1961. OCLC 15593827
- Arrow of God (1964). London: Heinemann African Writers Series, No. 16; New York: John Day, 1967. OCLC 13904845
- A Man of the People (1966). London: Heinemann African Writers Series, No. 31; New York: John Day. OCLC 367876
- Anthills of the Savannah (1987). London: Heinemann African Writers Series [unnumbered]. OCLC 16225418

== Children's literature ==
- Chike and the River (1966). Cambridge: Cambridge University Press. OCLC 728183723
- How the Leopard Got His Claws (1972). Enugu: Nwamife Publications; New York: The Third Press, 1973. OCLC 2304372
- The Drum (1977). London: Heinemann. ISBN 978-0434006045
- The Flute (1977). Enugu: Fourth Dimension Publishers. OCLC 8796371

== Short story collections ==
- The Sacrificial Egg (1962). Onitsha, Nigeria: Etudo Ltd; London: Heinemann African Writers Series. OCLC 825164938
- Girls at War (1972). London: Heinemann African Writers Series. OCLC 1999073

== Poetry collections ==
- Beware, Soul Brother (1971). Enugu: Nwankwo-Ifejika; London: Heinemann African Writers Series, No. 120 (republished as Christmas in Biafra and Other Poems (1973). New York: Doubleday. OCLC 659990
- Collected Poems (2004). London: Penguin Books. OCLC 61529318

== Essay collections ==
- Morning Yet on Creation Day (1975). London: Heinemann. OCLC 1532099
- Hopes and Impediments (1988). London: Heinemann. OCLC 22610665
- Home and Exile (2000). London: Oxford University Press. OCLC 43296876
- The Education of a British-Protected Child (2009). London: Penguin Classics

== Political treatise ==
- The Trouble with Nigeria (1983). Enugu: Fourth Dimension Publishers; London: Heinemann, 1984

== Memoir ==
- There Was A Country (2012). London: Penguin Classics

== Other works ==
=== Articles ===
Sources:

- "Are We Men of Two Worlds?" (1963). Spear.
- "The Role of the Writer in a New Nation" (1964). Nigerian Libraries, pages 113–119.
- "Philosophy" (21 February 1951). The Bug.
- "An Argument Against the Existence of Faculties" (1951). University Herald.
- "Mr. Okafor Versus Arts Students" (29 November 1952). The Bug.
- "Hiawatha" (29 November 1952). The Bug.
- "Eminent Nigerians of the 19th Century" (1958). Radio Times.
- "Listening in the East" (1959). Radio Times.
- "Two West African Library Journals" (6 May 1961). The Service.
- "Amos Tutuola" (29 July 1961). Radio Times.
- "Writers' Conference: A Milestone in Africa's Progress" (7 July 1962). Daily Times.
- "Conference of African Writers" (15 July 1962). Radio Times.

=== Essays ===
Sources:

- "A Look at West African Writing" (1963). Spear
- "How it Began" (1963). Voice of Nigeria magazine.
- "On Janheinz Jahn and Ezekiel Mphahlele" (1963). Transition Magazine. doi:10.2307/2934524 JSTOR 2934524.
- "English and the African Writer" (1965). Transition Magazine.
- "The Black Writer's Burden" (1966). Présence Africaine.

=== Poems ===
- "There was a Young Man in Our Hall" (1951–1952). University Herald, page 19
- "Flying" (1973). Okike, pages 47–48
- "The Old Man and the Census" (1974). Okike, pages 41–42

=== Short stories ===
Sources:

- "In a Village Church" (1951)
- "The Old Order in Conflict with the New" (1952). University Herald
- "Dead Men's Path" (1953)
- "Chike's School Days" (1969). Rotarian
- "The Voter" (1965)
- "Civil Peace" (1971). Okike
- "Sugar Baby" (1972). Okike
- "Marriage Is a Private Affair" (1972)
- "Vengeful Creditor" (1972)

== Works cited ==
- Boehmer, Elleke (2014). "Chinua Achebe, a Father of Modern African Literature". PMLA. 129 (2). Modern Language Association: 237–240. ISSN 0030-8129. JSTOR 24769450.
- Booker, M. Keith (2003). The Chinua Achebe Encyclopedia. Foreword by Simon Gikandi. Westport, US: Greenwood Press. ISBN 978-3-8255-0021-4. Archived from the original on 11 May 2021.
- Currey, James; Hallett, George (2008). Africa writes back : the African writers series & the launch of African literature. Oxford, Johannesburg, Athens, Ohio, Ibadan, Nairobi, Harare, Dar es Salaam: James Currey; Wits University Press; Ohio University Press; Weaver Press; Mkuki na Nyota. ISBN 978-0-8214-1843-7. OCLC 230198710.
- Evalds, Victoria K. (September 1977). "Book Review Section: Chinua Achebe: Bio-Bibliography and Recent Criticism, 1970–75". A Current Bibliography on African Affairs. 10 (1). Sage Publishing: 67–87. doi:10.1177/001132557801000105. S2CID 161675210.
- Frederick, Ben (22 March 2013). "Chinua Achebe is remembered as the 'father of modern African literature'". The Christian Science Monitor.
- Lindfors, Bernth (Spring 1978). "A Checklist of Works by and About Chinua Achebe". Obsidian. 4 (1). Illinois State University: 103–117. JSTOR 44491317.
- Ochiagha, Terri (20 April 2022). "Chinua Achebe". Oxford Research Encyclopedia of African History. Oxford University Press. doi:10.1093/acrefore/9780190277734.013.814. ISBN 978-0-19-027773-4.
- Parkes, Nii Ayikwei (2 December 2009). "No individual 'fathered' modern African literature". The Guardian.
- Purcell, William F. (2013). "Converting Culture: Reading Chinua Achebe's 'Marriage Is a Private Affair' in Light of Bernard Lonergan's Theology of Conversion". Religion & Literature. 45 (1). University of Notre Dame: 81–101. JSTOR 24397810.
- Purcell, William F. (12 June 2020). "'A Crucial Part of the Social and Cultural Fabric': Christianity and Chinua Achebe's 'In a Village Church'". The Explicator. 78 (2): 108–112. doi:10.1080/00144940.2020.1777077. S2CID 221061644.
- Showalter, Elaine (21 January 2009). "1000 Novels Everyone Must Read | The Best of Chinua Achebe". The Guardian.
- White, Jeremy B. (16 November 2017). "Why Chinua Achebe Is One of the World's Most Important Modern Writers". The Independent. Archived from the original on 18 March 2025.
