= Chinua Achebe Poetry and Essay Anthology =

The Chinua Achebe Poetry/Essay Anthology is an annual international anthology of poems and essays established in memory of Prof. Chinua Achebe, a renowned Nigerian author.

Organized by the Society of Young Nigerian Writers (Anambra State) in association with the Chinua Achebe Literary Festival and Memorial Lecture, the anthology was initiated in 2016 by Izunna Okafor, a Nigerian writer and journalist who also serves as the Editor-in-Chief.

Featuring works from various writers worldwide, including contributions from figures such as Mbizzo Chirasha, Akachi Adimora-Ezeigbo, Oseloka Obaze, the anthology serves as a platform for diverse literary expressions.

The latest/2023 edition of this anthology is Anthills of Words (In Memory of Achebe)
