= Sylvie Ntsame =

Gabonese writer

Sylvie Ntsame is a Gabonese novelist and president of the Gabonese Writers' Association.

== Biography ==
Sylvie Ntsame works as a civil servant and has also been president of the Gabonese Writers' Association since 2006, an association that was formed on April 29, 1987. She is the founder of the association "Smile to the needy child" which started in 2001 and focuses on child education and distribution of gifts to needy children during Christmas.

She was a member of the delegation of The Pan African Writers' Association (PAWA) that instituted programs to honour Chinua Achebe (author of Things Fall Apart) towards the 2014 International Writers' Day event.

She developed an interest for writing at an early age and mentioned in an interview that before 6th grade she had read Harlequin and Agatha Christie's books. She wrote "La correspondance administrative et diplomatique" her first novel after that but it was never published because she could not afford to pay for the cost of a typewriter.

As of February 2017, she has been the president of the Alliance of Central African Publishers.
