= Chinua Achebe Literary Festival =

Annual literary event honouring Nigerian writer Chinua Achebe

Chinua Achebe Literary festival
- Language: English

Origin
- Region of origin: Nigeria

Chinua Achebe Literary Festival is an annual literary event held in honour of Nigerian writer and literary critic Chinua Achebe, the author of Things Fall Apart (1958), in commemoration and celebration of his works and immense contributions in the literary field.

Chinua Achebe lived between 16 November 1930 to 21 March 2013, when he died in Massachusetts, United States.

The literary festival was initiated in 2016, three years after Achebe's death, by award-winning Nigerian writer, journalist, and Igbo-language activist Izunna Okafor, who is also Anambra State's Coordinator of Society of Young Nigerian Writers, the literary body that organizes the event.

Since its inception, the event has been held annually on Chinua Achebe's date of birth (16 November) at the Prof. Kenneth Dike Central E-Library in Awka, the capital city of Anambra State, Achebe's home state. Prior to the event each year, the organizers open and publicize a "Call For Submissions" on various online literary platforms and magazines, for writers to write and submit poems and essays in honour of Achebe, which they thereafter publish as an anthology, known as the "Chinua Achebe Poetry/Essay Anthology".

The annual anthology is usually published and unveiled on day of the literary festival, and has attracted and featured works of writers from different countries of the world, including Zimbabwe's Mbizo Chirasha

For the first three years of the literary event in 2016, 2017, and 2018, the organizers consecutively called for submissions and consequently published three anthologies. However, for the 2019 edition of the event, there was no call for submissions; rather, the three previously published anthologies were collated and published together as a single anthology, entitled Arrows of Words

In 2020, during the fifth edition and fifth year anniversary of the event, the organizers added Achebe Memorial Lecture to the Festival, hence it is now known as the Chinua Achebe Literary Festival and Memorial Lecture. The maiden Chinua Achebe Memorial Lecture, which was the first of its kind, was delivered by Oseloka Obaze, a prolific Nigerian literary figure and diplomat.

The 2020 edition of the event also featured the unveiling and official presentation of the Fifth Chinua Achebe Poetry/Essay Anthology, entitled Achebe: A Man of the People, edited by Izunna Okafor.

Over the years, Chinua Achebe Literary Festival has attracted the participation of many literary enthusiasts and dignitaries, including the Labour Party presidential candidate in the 2023 Nigeria's general election, Mr. Peter Obi; Executive Governor of Anambra State Willie Obiano; former SSG, Anambra State, Oseloka Obaze; Nigerian legendary actor, Bob-Manuel Udokwu; former Chief Judge, Anambra State, Prof. Peter Umeadi; MD/CEO of National Light newspaper, Chuka Nnabuife; Odili Ujubuońu (author of Pregnancy of the Gods); Maxim Uzor Uzoatu (author of God of Poetry); Ositadimma Amakeze (author of The Last Carver); Okeke Chika Jerry (author of The Gods Are Hungry); Mr. Isidore Emeka Uzoatu (author of Vision Impossible).
