= Chidi Chike Achebe =

Nigerian-American physician executive

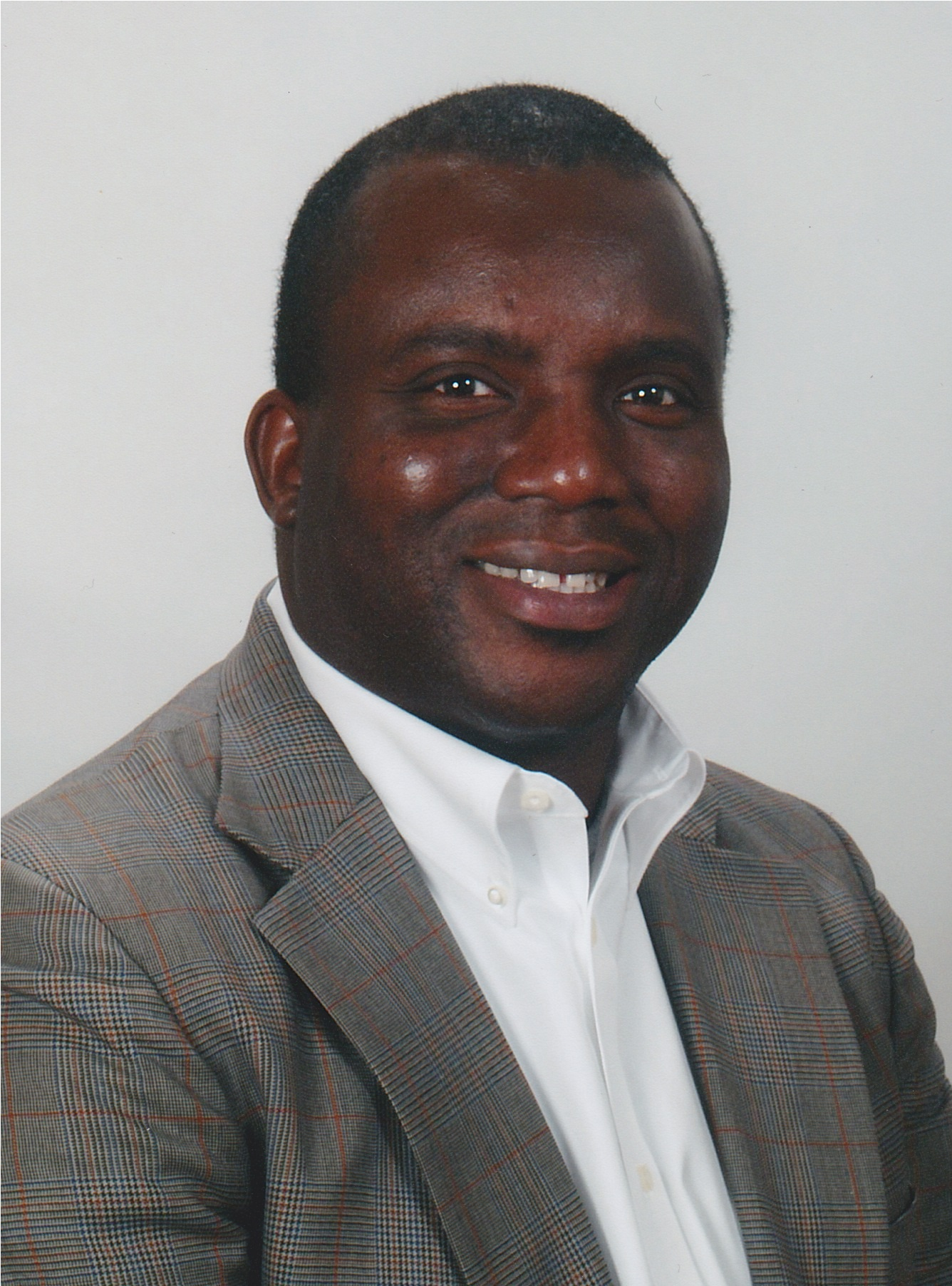
- Born: Chidi Chike Achebe; 1967 (age 58–59); Enugu, Nigeria
- Education: Harvard School of Public Health
- Occupation: Physician

Chidi Chike Achebe (born 1967) is a Nigerian-American physician executive who currently serves as the chairman and chief executive officer (CEO) of African Integrated Development Enterprise (AIDE). He has also served as the president and CEO of Harvard Street Neighborhood Health Center, medical director of Whittier Street Health Center and as assistant professor at Tufts University School of Medicine.

Achebe also serves as medical consultant for Clean Water for Kids, an NGO that brings fresh water to underserved communities in Liberia, and advisor for Tesfa Health in Bahirdar, Ethiopia.

== Biography ==
Born in Enugu in southeastern Nigeria, Achebe is the third child of Chinua Achebe and Professor Christie Chinwe Okoli-Achebe. His father is regarded as the "father of modern African literature" and best known for the trilogy of classic African novels Things Fall Apart (1958); "No Longer at Ease" (1960); and "Arrow of God" (1964). In 1972, shortly after the end of the Nigerian civil war, the family moved to the U.S. for about five years while his father held professorships at American universities. They resided again in Nigeria during the 1980s, before returning to the U.S. His younger sister Nwando Achebe is a historian and professor at Michigan State University.

Achebe completed undergraduate studies in natural sciences, history and philosophy at Bard College; received an MPH from the Harvard School of Public Health, his MD at Dartmouth Medical School and an MBA degree at Yale University's School of Management. He also completed his residency in both Internal Medicine and Pediatrics at the University of Texas, Texas Medical Center in Houston, Texas. After several years of work at various Boston health centers, Achebe says he now sees "the struggle against inequalities in health and health care for all vulnerable, under served Americans, as the next stage of the Civil Rights movement".

Chidi Achebe is married to Maureen Okam-Achebe who is a hematology/oncology specialist at Harvard University's Brigham and Women's Hospital. They have three sons.

== Awards and recognitions ==
- 2012: Dartmouth College Martin Luther King Award
- 2022: John and Samuel Bard Award in Medicine and Science by Bard College

== Selected publications ==
- Achebe, Chidi; Epstein, Paul R. (2003). "Oil: Prize or Curse?". Energy Bulletin.
- Achebe, Chidi (2004). "AIDS: 'A Disease of Mass Destruction'". Dialectical Anthropology. 28 (3–4): 261–287. doi:10.1007/s10624-004-3590-8. S2CID 145075406. Archived from the original on 1 June 2014.
- "AIDS: 'A Disease of Mass Destruction' An Assault to our Shared Humanity". Mary Slessor Journal of Medicine. 4 (1): 1–17. 2004. doi:10.4314/msjm.v4i1.11019.
- Ojukwu, Adeze (March 2004). "Contributions of the African American". Archived from the original on 14 April 2010.
- Achebe, Chidi; Howard-Robinson, Victoria (January 2004). "Prostate Cancer and Black Men: A call to action". Archived from the original on 23 March 2005.
- Achebe, Chidi; Lisa McGuire - Public Health Liaison (2004). "The Polio Epidemic in Nigeria: a Public Health Emergency (2)". UMN: Bio-Med Library – Public Health. Archived from the original on 2014-07-19.
