= Port Harcourt Book Festival =

Literary festival

Coordinates: 4°49′45″N 6°59′51″E

- Status: Active
- Genre: Book festival
- Frequency: Annually
- Venue: Hotel Presidential
- Locations: Port Harcourt, Rivers State
- Country: Nigeria
- Inaugurated: 2008
- Attendance: 9,000
- Organizer: Rainbow Book Club
- Website: www.portharcourtbookfestival.com

The Port Harcourt Book Festival is an annual literary event in Port Harcourt, Rivers State, Nigeria, organised by the Rainbow Book Club and endorsed by the Rivers State Government since 2008. The Garden City Literary Festival, which is currently known as the Port Harcourt Book Festival was founded by Governor Amaechi of Rivers State, Hundreds of literary fans flock to the Garden City every year for this six-day event, which includes a book fair, writers' workshops, and a variety of other activities. In the past the Festival has been attended by recognized authors and has hosted a number of celebrities.

== Early history ==
The festival began as the brainchild of Koko Kalango, who thought it up as a means to propel tourism numbers and heighten literacy awareness in the city of Port Harcourt and its neighboring areas. Originally scheduled for 8 September each year, to coincide with United Nations' International Literacy Day, the festival has continued to expand and has been highly rated since its debut.

== Highlights ==
=== 2008–2010 ===
The inaugural edition was held as a three-day event on 24 – 27 September 2008. It was dubbed Garden City Literary Festival, with its theme as "Writers Without Borders". Special guests included Wole Soyinka, Kofi Awoonor and Elechi Amadi, along with writers Okey Ndibe, Kaine Agary and Petrina Crockford.

The second festival ("Nigeria: 50 Years of Post-Colonial Literature"), on 23 – 26 September 2009, hosted authors Ngũgĩ wa Thiong'o, J. P. Clark, Buchi Emecheta, A. Igoni Barrett, Sefi Atta, Lindsay Barrett, Toni Kan, Fela Durotoye, Tade Ipadeola, Jumoke Verissimo, Abimbola Adunni, and Joy Isi Bewaji. It was coordinated by UK's Nana Ayebia Clarke, along with representatives from Book Builders and the British Council. Author Ngugi wa Thiong'o presented a keynote speech at the event which was titled Languages as Bridges: Building Network against Linguistic Feudalism and Darwinism. The 2010 festival saw a change in its month of occurrence for the first time, as it was held between 8 and 11 December 2010. More than 1,000 people attended the event that year.

=== 2011–2013 ===
In 2011, the event shifted back to its initial period, taking place 12 to 17 September 2011. Its theme was "Literature and Politics". The festival was formally opened by Governor Chibuike Amaechi and former Commonwealth Secretary-General, Emeka Anyaoku. For the first time in its history, it lasted for five days. Other prominent attendees were Chinua Achebe's son Dr. Chidi Achebe—who presented the main speech—and activist Jesse Jackson.

The fifth Garden City Literary Festival, "Women in Literature", was moved to October 2012, and held from the 15th - 20th. The Rainbow Book Club chose Hotel Presidential as the festival venue. GCLF guest authors such as Véronique Tadjo, Doreen Baingana, Elechi Amadi, Gabriel Okara and Prof. E J Alagoa were there to participate. There was also the launch of A Coat of Many Colours, a book put together by Mrs Koko Kalango, alongside president Goodluck Jonathan and Governor Amaechi, both of whom contributed to its Foreword and Introduction respectively. Also joining the group were former Cross Rivers State Governor H.E. Donald Duke, Wole Soyinka, and Mrs Ibim Semenitari. Towards the end of the occasion, the city of Port Harcourt was reaffirmed as UNESCO's World Book Capital for the year 2014. In August 2013, Mrs Kalango announced that the Garden City Literary Festival has been renamed Port Harcourt Book Festival, citing reasons that the new name would assist in elevating Port Harcourt's profile as a legitimate destination for all things literary.

=== 2014 ===
In 2014, the festival took place in Port Harcourt and was opened with a keynote address from Nobel Laureate, Professor Wole Soyinka. The theme of the festival was "Books: Windows to our World of Possibilities”. Some of the highlights of the events in 2014 included the presentation of a dance-drama titled "Along Came the Book" which was directed by award-winning playwright Bikiya Graham-Douglas. In addition to it, there was a presentation of a book titled "The Walking Book" which is a communal story covering the sights and sounds of Rivers State written by different children who were selected from the 23 local government areas in River State. Twelve books were carefully selected to be featured in the festival in 2014. Some of the books includes Arrow of God by Chinua Achebe (April), The Great Ponds by Elechi Amadi (May), This Child Shall be Great by Ellen Shirleaf Johnson (June), Ake by Wole Soyinka (July) and Tomorrow Died Yesterday by Chimeka Garricks (August). The world book capital position always brings benefits to children in terms of improving their reading and literary culture and submissions to host it are always considered based on the impact of a book club in the aspect of reading culture and literary programs in the society.

In 2014, the festival brought honour to sub-Sahara Africa, when the city won the right to host UNESCO World Book Capital. Alexandra, Egypt, was the other African city to be so honoured.The conversation on the abduction of the 250 Chibok schoolgirls also started with Nobel laureate, Prof. Wole Soyinka along with Dr. Oby Ezekwesili gave voice to the abduction of over 250 Chibok schoolgirls in Northern Nigeria. Port Harcourt handed over the position as the UNESCO World Book Capital to Incheon in South Korea in April 2015. Port Harcourt became the second African City and the first sub-Saharan city to hold this position all thanks to the Rainbow Book Club whose submission to host the annual book day to the UNESCO was approved. Port Harcourt became the 4th city to be named the UNESCO World Book Capital following other countries like Madrid, Amsterdam, Beirut and others. The world book capital always holds that position for one year and it starts on 23 April of the chosen year.

2015

The festival was stalled in 2015 due to lack of funding, this was due to the change in leadership of the state, the Rivers State Government being the prominent partners.Critics and academics have attributed this to a lack of strategic planning asides from funding sources or issues.
