= Beware, Soul Brother =

1971 poetry collection by Chinua Achebe

Beware, Soul Brother is a 1971 poetry collection by Chinua Achebe. A 150-page poetry book, Achebe added poems about his experience before, during and after the Nigerian Civil War.

== Background ==
Achebe wrote more short fictions, prose and novels more than he wrote poems and poetry collections. His early poems were collected under the title "Beware, Soul Brother". Written within a space of four years, the first edition was published in 1971 by Nwankwo Ifejika publisher in Enugu State, Nigeria and it contained 23 poems, while the revised second edition was published in 1972 by Heinemann in London and Doubleday in the US. It contained 30 poems and won the Commonwealth Poetry Prize that year.

== Reception ==
In 1973, Ernest Nneji Emenyonu called the book the "best and most organized collection" among the "substantial body of poetry produced on the theme of war" in the wake of the Nigerian civil war.

The collection's opening poem, "The First Shot," was described by Donatus Nwoga as "explosive." According to Nwoga, in the title poem, Achebe "extends [the civil war's] political meaning beyond the particular Nigerian past to the black man, glorifying his rhythmic soulfulness, unwatchful of others 'lying in wait leaden-footed, tone-deaf passionate only for the deep entrails of our soil.'" Other poems such as "Refugee Mother and Child" and "Christmas in Biafra," the latter dated 1969, demonstrate "intense pity successfully conveyed."

== See also ==
- Chinua Achebe bibliography

== Sources ==
- Innes, Catherine Lynette (1992-03-26). Chinua Achebe. Cambridge University Press. ISBN 978-0-521-42897-2.
