= Port Harcourt Poetry Festival =

Annual poetry festival in Nigeria

- Status: Active
- Genre: Poetry festival, spoken word
- Frequency: Annually
- Locations: Port Harcourt, Rivers State, Nigeria
- Inaugurated: 2023
- Website: https://phpoetryfestival.com/

Port Harcourt Poetry Festival is an annual poetry and spoken word festival held in Port Harcourt, Rivers State, Nigeria. The festival features performances, workshops, panel discussions, competitions, and other literary activities, aiming to promote poetry, nurture emerging poets, and engage the community.

== History ==
The festival was established in 2023 by Nigerian poets and literary enthusiasts to provide a platform for poets and literary creators to showcase their work and foster creative collaboration.

== Editions ==
=== 2023 ===
The inaugural edition took place from 3–5 November 2023, featuring workshops, panel discussions, and performances by local and national poets.

=== 2024 ===
The second edition was held at The Azny Place with the theme “Bridging The Gap,” including poetry slams, workshops, and panel discussions. Winners of poetry competitions received cash prizes and recognition.

=== 2025 ===
The third edition was held on the 7th of November 2025 at the Knowledge Development Centre, Waterlines, Port Harcourt, with the theme “Beyond Boundaries.”

Activities included workshops, panel sessions, poetry slams for high school students, film screenings, and the launch of the My Garden City poetry anthology, compiled from submissions by secondary school students across Rivers State. Notable literary figures such as Dr Kudo Eresia‑Eke, Prof Obari Gomba, Umar Abubakar Sidi, Amu Nnadi, and Uzo Nwamara were involved in reviewing the anthology.

== Activities ==
The festival typically includes:

- Poetry performances and spoken word showcases
- Workshops and masterclasses for aspiring poets
- Panel discussions on literary topics
- Competitive poetry slams
- Community engagement programs and school participation

== See also ==
- Port Harcourt Book Festival
- List of festivals in Nigeria
