= Civil Peace =

Short story by Chinua Achebe

- Short story by Chinua Achebe
- Genre: Short story

Publication
- Publisher: Bedford/St. Martin's

Civil Peace is a 1971 short story by Chinua Achebe. It is about the effects of the Nigerian Civil War (1967–1970) on the people and the "civil peace" that followed.

== Plot summary ==
The story starts off in eastern Nigeria after the civil war has ended. The protagonist, Jonathan Iwegbu, was able to keep his bicycle, which he turns into a taxi to make money. In two weeks he makes 115 pounds. Jonathan then travels to Enugu to search for his home, and to his surprise it is still standing when other structures around it are demolished. The house needs some repairs, so Jonathan finds some supplies around and makes it look like a home again. He then moves his family back in. The entire family works hard to earn money and rebuild their lives. The children pick mangoes and sell them to soldier's wives, while Maria makes akara balls to sell to their neighbours. After finding that his job as a miner isn't a possibility, he decides to run a bar for soldiers out of his house.

Jonathan gets an "egg rasher" (a butchered pronunciation of the Latin ex gratia, which translates into "as a favor") for turning in rebel currency to the Treasury, and in exchange they gave him 20 pounds legitimate currency. The next night, a large group of robbers show up at his house demanding 100 pounds. When Jonathan replies that he only has 20 pounds, the leader of the robbers demands he hand the money through the open window. After they take the money, life goes on as usual for Jonathan because "Nothing Puzzles God," meaning that the robbery has a greater meaning in God's eyes than how it seemed to Jonathan.

== Character overview ==
Jonathan Iwegbu

Jonathan Iwegbu, the protagonist of Civil Peace, is the optimistic nucleus of the entire narrative. Despite the recent devastation of the Biafran War, Jonathan exhibits a happy tone in the face of death. Jonathan's optimism is first demonstrated in the first paragraph when he exclaims how happy he is for his life. The quote repeated towards the end of the book reflects the theme is "Nothing puzzles God" and then continues to explain "He had come out of the war with five inestimable blessings --- his head, his wife Maria’s head, and the heads of three out of their four children." The protagonist is happy because he can now enjoy the company of those alive, instead of being sad for the one who died. Jonathan's optimism continues to prevail when he sees his house for the first time which, was slightly damaged "But what was that?" and then continues to explain that he had enough time left in the day to forage for materials "... before thousands more came out of their forest holes looking for the same things," further emphasizing his optimism and its benefits. Later in the story, Jonathan opens a bar, creating new employment as opposed to dwelling in the fact that his former job, mining coal, is no longer an option. Jonathan's optimism remains unshakable through to the end of the story even when all of his money is stolen by thieves.

== Historical context ==
Much of Chinua Achebe's literature was inspired by the events of the Biafran War and by the responses to a war that, for many Igbo writers, was a struggle for survival, a search for a new beginning for Africa, and a redefinition of Black identity in the context of a complex world behavior. A leading novelist at the time, Chinua Achebe was a pioneer in post-war Igbo literary activities. Achebe maintained

It is clear to me that an African creative writer who tries to avoid the big social and political issues of contemporary Africa will end up being completely irrelevant --- like the absurd man in the proverb who leaves his burning house to pursue a rat fleeing from the flames.

Achebe does not hide the fact that the Biafran situation has affected his creativity in no small way.
