= Home and Exile =

Collection by Chinua Achebe

Home and Exile is a collection of talks delivered by Chinua Achebe in Harvard University 1998.
