= The Sacrificial Egg =

1962 short story collection by Chinua Achebe

"The Sacrificial Egg" is a 1962 short story collection by Chinua Achebe. It was published on January 1, 1962, by Etudo Limited publishers in Nigeria.

== Analysis ==
The story deals with smallpox, a pandemic. Like "The Elephant Vanishes" by Haruki Murakami, the story deals with the progression of societal orders, where the previous order gives certain thing the new order didn't give. Julius Obi, an Igbo man who was educated in the Western world come to terms with the influence of Kitikpa, a disease traditionally believed to be smallpox, thereby making him recognise his reluctance to local tradition as he was raised in a modern and post-colonialist lifestyle.

== Themes ==
The major theme of the short story collection is culture clash between the Igbo tradition and the western beliefs.
