= Morning Yet on Creation Day =

1975 essay collection by Chinua Achebe

- Author: Chinua Achebe
- Language: English
- Publication date: 1975

Morning Yet on Creation Day is a 1975 essay collection by Nigerian author and literary critic Chinua Achebe.

== Sources ==
- Achebe, Chinua (1976). "Review: Morning Yet on Creation Day: Essays". Research in African Literatures. 7 (2). Indiana University Press: 242–245. ISSN 0034-5210. JSTOR 3818720.
- Dorsey, David (1978). "Chinua Achebe. Morning yet on creation day: Essays . Garden city, New York: Doubleday, 1975; and Wole Soyinka. Myth, literature and the African world . Cambridge: Cambridge university press, 1976". World Literature Written in English. 17 (2): 453–460. doi:10.1080/17449857808588548. ISSN 0093-1705.
