= The Trouble with Nigeria =

- Author: Chinua Achebe
- Language: English
- Publisher: Fourth Dimension Publishers
- Publication date: 1983
- LC Class: DT515.8 .A67

The Trouble with Nigeria is a 1983 book by Chinua Achebe.

== Reviews ==
Afrocritik

== Secondary sources ==
- Achebe, Chinua (1983). The trouble with Nigeria. Enugu, Nigeria: Fourth Dimension Publishers. ISBN 978-978-156-147-4.
