= Vengeful Creditor =

Short story by Chinua Achebe

Vengeful Creditor is a short story by Chinua Achebe. It was first published in 1972 in Girls at War and Other Stories. The story describes a wealthy woman who has recently lost her servants due to free education. The book intends to illustrate the social gaps in Nigeria between the lower, middle, and upper classes.
