= The Education of a British-Protected Child =

2008 essay collection by Chinua Achebe

The Education of a British-Protected Child is a 2008 essay collection by Chinua Achebe.

== Reception ==
- The Christian Science Monitor
- The Guardian
