= Oseloka H. Obaze =

Nigerian politician

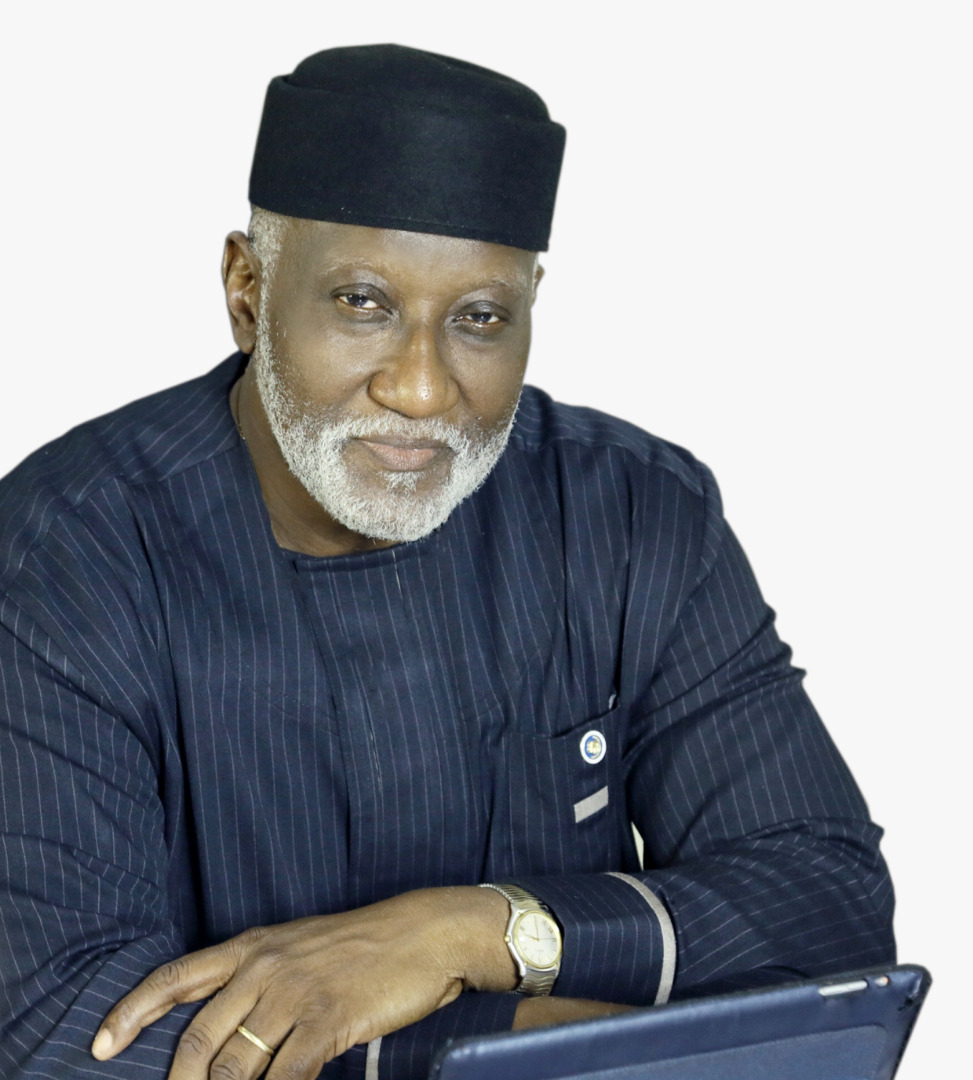
Oseloka Henry Obaze is a Diplomat, Politician and Author. A former international civil servant with the United Nations, and a former member of the Nigeria Diplomatic Service, he is a notable administrator, writer and politician. He was the flag bearer of the Peoples Democratic Party for the 2017 Anambra State Governorship Elections held in November 2017, in which he finished third.

Oseloka Henry Obaze (OHO) (born 9 April 1955 in Ogidi, Nigeria) is a native of Ochuche Umuodu in Anambra State, Nigeria. He is a Nigerian diplomat, politician, author and a retired United Nations official who served the organization as an international civil servant between 1991 and 2012. Prior to working at the United Nations, he worked as a career Foreign Service Officer (FSO) in the Nigerian Diplomatic Service from 1982–1991. Following his retirement from the United Nations, Oseloka H. Obaze served as Secretary to the State Government of Anambra State, Nigeria from June, 2012 till June, 2015 under former Governor Peter Obi and former Governor Willie Obiano.

In November 2016, Oseloka Obaze announced his bid to contest for Anambra State Governorship primaries elections under the Peoples Democratic Party and was announced the party flag bearer on August 28, 2017.

== Early life and education ==
Oseloka H. Obaze is the second of six children born to Anthony Chukwunweike Obaze and Rosemary Omuluzua Obaze. His father Anthony was a Senior Local Government Administrator while his mother Rosemary was an educationist both in the former Eastern Region of Nigeria. He spent his childhood in Onitsha, Ogidi, Aguata, Umuahia, and Uzuakoli, where his father served at the various County Councils. He attended the highly reputed Christ the King College Onitsha from 1967 to 1973 (His education was interrupted briefly due to the Nigerian Civil War) and Dennis Memorial Grammar School in Onitsha from 1973 to 1974. He attended Nebraska Wesleyan University and University of Nebraska, both in Lincoln, Nebraska, USA, from where he respectively received his bachelor's and master's degree in Political Science and International Relations.

== Professional career ==
=== Federal Government of Nigeria ===
As a diplomat with the Nigerian Diplomatic Service, Oseloka Obaze served first as External Affairs Officer, Grade VIII from 1982 to 1983 then as Third Secretary (Political) from 1983 to 1986 both at the former Ministry of External Affairs in Lagos. He served as Second Secretary and Special Assistant (Policy Adviser) to Major-General Joseph N. Garba, in his various capacities as the Permanent Representative of Nigeria to the United Nations, 1987 to 1989; President of the 44th United Nations General Assembly and Ambassador-at-Large of Nigeria from 1989–1990. Thereafter Obaze served as First Secretary, Bilateral Economic Cooperation at the Ministry of Foreign Affairs (Nigeria) in 1991.

He led the Nigerian delegation who worked closely with former South African President Thabo Mbeki, and Gora Ebrahim, the Pan Africanist Congress (PAC) Secretary for Foreign Affairs in negotiating the UN Declaration on Apartheid, and its Destructive Consequences in Southern Africa.

=== United Nations ===
Oseloka H. Obaze joined the United Nations Secretariat in 1991 as a Political Affairs Officer of the Department of Political and Security Council Affairs (PSCA) at the United Nations Headquarters in New York and was involved in preventive diplomacy and post-conflict peace building. As part of his duties at the U.N., he contributed to the conceptualization, drafting and finalizing of strategic policy papers and reports of then U.N. Secretary-General Javier Perez de Cuellar to the U.N. General Assembly and the U.N. Security Council. He served on Special Envoys and Good Offices missions of the Secretary General in Cyprus (UNFICYP), in Zimbabwe and Northern Uganda with UNOCA, the 1992 U.N. Electoral Observation Team in Angola UNAVEM II and Natal/Kwazulu South Africa with UNOMSA in 1994. As part of his roles in PSCA he was policy adviser to Professor Ibrahim Gambari, then U.N. Under Secretary-General for Political Affairs on policy matters pertaining to Africa, U.N.- African Union cooperation (where he was a member of the Interdepartmental and Inter-Agency Task Force that drafted and negotiated the UN-AU Declaration signed in November 2006), Security Council thematic and sanctions panels, Security, Documentation and Electoral Assistance matters pertaining to Africa including representing the Under Secretary-General at in-house, inter-departmental and inter-agency meetings and consultations. He also developed policy options and guidance on U.N. political offices, in Somalia, Guinea Bissau, Central Africa Republic and West Africa UNOWA] to the Under Secretary-General.

Between 2007 and 2012, Obaze worked as a senior member of the managerial team in the Security Council Secretariat branch, which services the U.N. Security Council and also as the Secretary of the Security Council Adhoc Working Group on Conflict Prevention in Africa as well as a Trip Coordinator for various Security Council Missions.

Before leaving the U.N., Obaze served on the U.N. National Competitive Examination Political Board, G to P Examination Board, Joint Appeals Board (JAB) and the Central Review Committee (CRC) and with the UN Office of Internal Oversight (OIOS) in its evaluation of various U.N. Special Political Missions. He contributed to and participated at the first Kofi Annan Legacy For Africa Conference co-hosted by the U.N. and Georgetown University in October 2006.

Oseloka H. Obaze left the U.N. in 2012 to work with the Anambra State Government and was appointed as Secretary to the State Government by Peter Obi.

=== Anambra State Government ===
Oseloka H. Obaze served as the Ninth Secretary to the Government of Anambra State from 29 June 2012 to 8 June 2015 after retiring from the United Nations. He was preceded by Chief Paul Odenigbo and succeeded by Prof. Solo Chukwulobelu. Obaze was first appointed by Governor Peter Obi and subsequently reappointed by Peter Obi's successor, Governor Willie Obiano on 17 March 2014 where he served until 8 June 2015.

In addition to his roles as the Secretary to the State Government, Obaze served as Board of Trustees Chair of both the Anambra State Flood Disaster Emergency Fund and the Anambra State Flood Disaster Relief Coordination Committee. He was a Delegate to the South East Zonal Review of the 1999 Nigerian Constitution held in 2012 and Chairman of the Anambra State Government Handover Committee in 2014. Obaze played leading roles in returning his Alma mater Christ the King College Onitsha other mission schools in Anambra State from the government back to missionaries who were their initial owners and raising over N25 million towards revitalization projects at C.K.C. Onitsha.

== Consultancy ==
On leaving government in 2015, Obaze founded Selonnes Consult Ltd., a policy, governance and management consulting firm, where he served as Managing Director and Chief Executive Officer. From that position he ran for the governorship of Anambra State in 2017. He resumed his functions in the firm after his unsuccessful bid for the governorship.

In his February 2018 public policy lecture at UNIZIK, titled, "The Political Economy of Cattle Colony In Nigeria" he delineated the very limited exploitation and gross under-utilization of the vast value chain of Nigeria's cattle economy. (https://selonnes.com/2018/02/20/policy-brief-the-political-economy-of-cattle-colony-in-nigeria/

A few of his other policy briefs include:

Receding, Emerging and Resurging Issues and Trends in the Security Sector https://selonnes.com/2019/06/20/policy-brief-6319-receding-emerging-and-resurging-issues-and-trends-in-the-security-sector/

Nigerian Elite Endorse Democracy's Uncertainties https://selonnes.com/2018/05/05/policy-brief-4718-nigerian-elite-indorse-democracys-uncertainties/

Reducing the Cost of Governance in Nigeria https://selonnes.com/2019/05/13/reducing-the-cost-of-governance-in-nigeria/

Nigeria's Oil Economy Is Hobbled by Dissonance https://selonnes.com/2019/07/31/policy-brief-6519-nigerias-oil-economy-is-hobbled-by-dissonance/

Teach The Children Well; Don't Teach Them Nonsense https://selonnes.com/2018/11/17/teach-the-children-well-dont-teach-them-nonsense/

== Membership ==
Member, Nigerian Institute of International Affairs, https://niia.gov.ng/

Member, Society for International Relations Awareness (SIRA)

In November 2020, Oseloka H. Obaze, a member the Society for International Relations Awareness (SIRA), a leading foreign relations Think Tank in Africa, was elected Chairperson, Public Affairs Committee of the Think Thank. https://www.vanguardngr.com/2020/12/sira-leading-foreign-relations-think-tank-gets-new-leadership/

== Politics ==
Oseloka H. Obaze first came into politics in 2013 at the state level when he contested for the governorship of Anambra State under All Progressive Grand Alliance (APGA) but was disqualified by the party on the basis of voters' card technicality. In 2016, he emerged in the race again under the main opposition Peoples Democratic Party and was declared the party's flag bearer on August 28, 2017 to contest in the November 18 Anambra State governorship elections to be conducted by the Independent National Electoral Commission. In the latter part of 2017 he published a public policy book titled, "Prime Witness" on President Buhari's First Year in Office.

== Writings ==
Mr. Obaze is the author and co-author of six books:

- Joe Garba's Legacy (2012);
- Regarscent Past - A Collection of Poems (2015);
- Here to Serve - Speeches Op-Eds, Essays and Advocacy for Good Governance (2016);
- Prime Witness - Change and Policy Challenges in Buhari's Nigeria (2017).
- Waning Strength of Government (2020) (https://www.origami.com.ng/books/waning-strength-of-government/
- Africa's Vision - A Second Anthology (2020) (https://www.origami.com.ng/books/africas-vision-a-second-anthology/)

He has also written numerous critical essays on policy, national and international issues. He is a member, Executive Advisory Board of The New Diplomat Newspaper (Nigeria).

On 16 November, 2020, Obaze delivered the First Chinua Achebe Memorial Lecture, titled "If the Dead Could Speak, What Would Achebe Say of Present Day Nigeria?" at the fifth edition of Chinua Achebe Literary Festival organized by Society of Young Nigerian Writers (Anambra State Chapter) which held in Awka, Anambra State. This makes him the first person to have delivered the maiden memorial lecture in honour of the foremost Nigerian Literary Icon, Late Prof. Chinua Achebe
