= A Man of the People =

1966 novel by Chinua Achebe

- First US edition
- Author: Chinua Achebe
- Language: English
- Publisher: Heinemann (UK); John Day (US)
- Publication date: 1966; 60 years ago
- Publication place: United States
- Media type: Print (hardback)
- Pages: 167
- Preceded by: Arrow of God
- Followed by: Anthills of the Savannah

A Man of the People is a novel by Nigerian writer Chinua Achebe. Written as a satirical piece, A Man of the People follows the story told by Odili, a young and educated narrator, about his conflict with Chief Nanga, his former teacher, who enters a career in politics in an unnamed fictional 20th-century African country. Odili represents the changing younger generation, while Nanga represents the traditional West African customs inspired by Achebe's native Nigeria. The book ends with a military coup, similar to the real-life coup organized by Major Chukwuma Kaduna Nzeogwu, Major Adewale Ademoyega, Major Emmanuel Ifeajuna, Captain Chris Anuforo, Major Donatus Okafor, and Major Humphrey Chukwuka.

== Plot introduction ==
A Man of the People is a satirical novel written by Chinua Achebe, published in 1966. It tells the story of Odili, a young teacher in a small West African country, who becomes involved in politics and is swept into a corrupt world of greed and power.

The novel is set in an unnamed fictional West African country, and it provides a scathing critique of post-colonial African politics and the challenges faced by newly independent nations. The story is narrated by Odili, who initially supports Chief Nanga, a charismatic politician and former teacher, in his bid for re-election. However, as Odili becomes more involved in politics, he quickly realizes that Chief Nanga and his associates are deeply corrupt, using their positions of power for personal gain at the expense of the people they are supposed to serve.

As the story unfolds, Odili becomes disillusioned with Chief Nanga's hypocrisy and the widespread corruption that permeates the political system. He becomes embroiled in a struggle against the corrupt elite, attempting to expose their wrongdoing and stand up for the common people. Along the way, Odili faces various challenges and betrayals, including from people he once considered friends.

Achebe portrays the complexities and contradictions of African politics, shedding light on the challenges of nation-building, the abuse of power, and the struggle for integrity and social justice. A Man of the People is a thought-provoking novel that explores the intricacies of African politics and the human condition, and it remains a relevant and powerful critique of political corruption in contemporary societies.

== Similarity to future events ==
Upon reading an advance copy of the novel, Achebe's friend, Nigerian poet and playwright John Pepper Clark, declared: "Chinua, I know you are a prophet. Everything in this book has happened except a military coup!"

== Literary significance ==
Some of the themes from the novel are found in a short story titled "The Voter" (1965), which was published in Black Orpheus magazine. Achebe's first three novels were all clearly set in Igbo villages in Nigeria. However, A Man of the People was set in a fictional African country, as Achebe sought to write African literature on the condition of the continent in more general terms. The novel does not include any specific ethnic or cultural groups. The problems portrayed in the book, such as bribery, incompetence, and governmental apathy, were experienced by many West African nations in the neocolonial era. As Nigeria had not experienced a coup when Achebe wrote A Man of the People, his model for the novel's events must have been military coups in other African nations. Despite Achebe's intentions, however, the subsequent coup in Nigeria meant that the book was again seen as being principally about Nigeria.

The novel was republished in the influential Heinemann African Writers Series.
