= Dead Men's Path =

1953 short story by Chinua Achebe

Dead Men's Path is a short story by the Nigerian writer Chinua Achebe, first published in 1953. The short-story has been noted as an example of cultural conflict.

== Setting ==
Michael Obi is a young reform-minded educator living in Nigeria, January 1949. He is tasked with reforming Ndume Central School, a place known for its unprogressive or backwards ways.

Michael and his wife, Nancy, arrive at the village with the intention of forcing it into the modern age. Their two goals are to enforce a high standard of education and to turn the school campus into a place of beauty.

One evening Michael observes an old woman walking along a faint footpath that crosses the compound. After consulting with some members of the faculty, Michael learns that the school had attempted to close the path in the past and met with strong opposition from the nearby village. Afraid of giving a poor impression to the Government Education Officer scheduled to visit, Michael places a fence across the path and tops it with barbed wire. Three days after the fence is put up, Michael meets with the village priest, who explains the importance of the path and its relationship with the villagers' animist beliefs. Michael insists that the path remains closed and explains that the purpose of the school is to abolish such ancestral beliefs.

Two days later a young woman in the village dies in childbirth. A diviner recommends heavy sacrifices to appease the spirits who are insulted at having the footpath blocked. In the night the flowers and hedges are torn up and trampled to death and one of the school buildings is torn down. When the Government Education Officer arrives, he gives Obi a bad review and writes "a nasty report" on the "tribal-war situation developing between the school and the village."
