= How the Leopard Got His Claws =

1972 book by Chinua Achebe

- Author: Chinua Achebe, John Iroaganachi
- Illustrator: Per Christensen, Kevin Echeruo
- Genre: Fable, children's
- Published: 1972
- Publisher: Nwamife Publications, Candlewick Press
- Publication place: Nigeria
- ISBN: 0907108555

How the Leopard Got His Claws is an illustrated children's fable by Chinua Achebe and John Iroaganachi, an education officer and children's author. It features poetry by Christopher Okigbo, and was illustrated by Per Christensen and Kevin Echeruo; the latter is a brother of academic Michael Echeruo.

A retelling of the Igbo folktale "How the Dog Became a Domestic Animal", the story was majorly altered after Iroganachi sent it to Achebe for publishing. It was first published by Nwamife Publications in Enugu, in 1972, then was redrawn by American illustrator Mary GrandPré and released by Candlewick Press in 2011.

Thematically, the book reflects the secession and return of Biafra as part of Nigeria in the late 1960s. An allegory, it tells the story of animals living in an egalitarian society who are ruled by a clawless leopard. A wild dog exploits the animals' work, such as by using their shelter without contributing to the creation of it. The leopard ends up growing claws and attacking the dog, after which he leaves. Writer M. Keith Booker described it as an allegory for the Nigerian Civil War. Ernest Emenyonu described it as a political satire about worker exploitation, saying "there is a tendency to match names of animals with names of actual people in the [Nigerian Civil War]".

The book received somewhat positive reviews from critics. A critic of The Conch Review of Books described the book as "a welcome and timely development", with "all the essentials of the best of folktales". Writing for The Guardian, John Rowe Townsend said the book was "not actually a brilliant story, but it is a book worth giving".
