= Girls at War =

1972 short story by Chinua Achebe

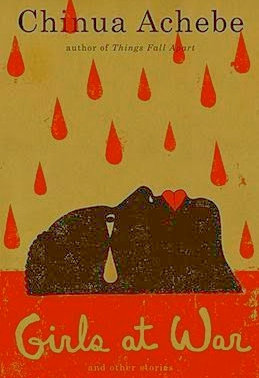
- Author: Chinua Achebe
- Original title: Girls at War and Other Stories
- Language: English
- Genre: Fiction
- Publisher: Penguin Publishing Group
- Publication date: February 1972
- Publication place: Nigeria
- ISBN: 0385418965

"Girls at War" is a short story by Chinua Achebe from the 1972 collection of the same name. The narrative focuses on the theme of survival amidst the uncertainties of war.

== Plot ==
During a war, Reginald Nwankwo meets Gladys, a militia girl, at a checkpoint.

Their paths cross again, Gladys. As Reginald prepares to take Gladys home, their departure is delayed, and their car breaks down and they are caught in an air raid..

== Reception ==
A review of the collection found it decent.
