= Anthills of the Savannah =

1987 novel by Chinua Achebe

- First edition cover
- Author: Chinua Achebe
- Language: English
- Genre: Literary Fiction
- Set in: Kangan (fictional country)
- Publisher: Heinemann
- Publication date: 1987
- Media type: Print
- ISBN: 978-0-385-26045-9
- OCLC: 19932181
- Preceded by: A Man of the People
- Followed by: There was a Country: A Personal History of Biafra

Anthills of the Savannah is a 1987 novel by Nigerian writer Chinua Achebe. It was his fifth novel, first published in the United Kingdom 21 years after Achebe's previous one (A Man of the People in 1966), and was credited with having "revived his reputation in Britain". A finalist for the 1987 Booker Prize for Fiction, Anthills of the Savannah has been described as the "most important novel to come out of Africa in the [1980s]". Critics praised the novel upon its release.

== Plot ==
The plot centres around the political intrigue, in an imaginary West African country of Kangan, where a Sandhurst-trained officer, identified only as Sam and known as "His Excellency", has taken power following a military coup. Achebe describes the political situation through the experiences of three friends: Chris Oriko, the government's Commissioner for Information; Beatrice Okoh, an official in the Ministry of Finance, and, girlfriend of Chris; and Ikem Osodi, a newspaper editor critical of the regime. Other characters include Elewa, Ikem's girlfriend, and Major "Samsonite" Ossai, a military official known for stapling hands with a Samsonite stapler. Tensions escalate throughout the novel, culminating in the assassination of Ikem by the regime, the toppling and death of Sam, and finally the murder of Chris. The book ends with a non-traditional naming ceremony for Elewa and Ikem's month-old daughter, organized by Beatrice.

== Reception ==
The novel was well-received by critics. Charles Johnson, writing for The Washington Post, praised the book but faulted Achebe for failing to fully flesh out his characters. Nadine Gordimer praised the book's "interesting" humour, particularly when contrasted against its depictions of horrors. Ben Okri described it in The Observer as Achebe's "most complex and his wisest book to date".
