= Mbizo Chirasha =

Zimbabwean poet

Mbizo Chirasha (born 1978) is a Zimbabwean poet. In Diogen magazine, he is described as an "acclaimed wordsmith, performances poet, widely published poet and writer", and according to the Stellenbosch Literary Project, he is "an internationally acclaimed Performance poet, Writer, Creative/Literary Projects Specialist, an Advocate of Girl Child Voices and Literacy Development."

== Career ==
The anthology Zimbolicious Poetry: Anthology of Zimbabwean Poets features Chirasha's poetry, revealing his poetic connection to Matabeleland. In the introduction to his volume of poetry Nest of Stones, Kenyan poet Wanjohi wa Makohha (born 1979) names him as one of the seven African poets that inspired him greatly.

== Projects ==
Chirasha has not only been a catalyst with regard to literary projects such as the Girl Child Creativity Project, the Girl Child Voices Fiesta, and the Young Writers Caravan, as well as creation of the Urban Colleges Writers Prize. He is also committed to a number of socially relevant projects in Zimbabwe. Susan Pietrzyk noted that Chirasha was actively involved as a poet in the campaign that seeks to make the population more aware of ways to protect themselves against AIDS.

According to the Stellenbosch Literary Project, Mbizo Chirasha has been published in more than 60 journals, various anthologies, newspapers, blogs and poetry collections. Thus he was among the poets selected by Diké Okoro when Okoro edited the notable anthology We Have Crossed Many Rivers: New Poetry From Africa. His poetry has also been featured in such renowned literary journals as Moto magazine.

== Outreach activities ==
Apart from many other activities as a committed Zimbabwean poet, such as his activity as Outreach Agent for the Zimbabwe Book Development Council, and as Delegate of the Zimbabwe International Book Fair dispatched to the Goteborg International Book Fair in Sweden in 2003, Chirasha was a writer in residence in Egypt in 2006; in 2009 he was invited to participate in the UNESCO Photo Novel Writing Project in Tanzania, and in the same year he took part in the International Conference of African Culture Development in Ghana as a poet in residence (in 2009). He was also Producer/Coordinator of the I am the Artist project, an Artist-in-Residence program of the Zimbabwe Germany Society in collaboration with the Goethe Zentrum.
