= No Longer at Ease =

1960 novel by Chinua Achebe

- First edition cover
- Author: Chinua Achebe
- Language: English
- Publisher: Heinemann
- Publication date: 1960
- Publication place: Nigeria
- Media type: Print
- Preceded by: Things Fall Apart
- Followed by: Arrow of God

No Longer at Ease is a 1960 novel by Chinua Achebe. It is the story of an Igbo man, Obi Okonkwo, who leaves his village for an education in Britain and then a job in the Colonial Nigeria civil service, but is conflicted between his African culture and Western lifestyle and ends up taking a bribe. The novel is the second novel by Achebe, and the second work in his "African trilogy", following Things Fall Apart and preceding Arrow of God.

== Title ==
The book's title was taken from the closing lines of T. S. Eliot's poem, "Journey of the Magi":

We returned to our places, these Kingdoms,
But no longer at ease here, in the old dispensation,
With an alien people clutching their gods.
I should be glad of another death.

== Plot summary ==
The novel begins with the trial of Obi Okonkwo, an Igbo man on the charge of accepting a bribe. It then jumps back in time to a point before his departure for England and works its way forward to describe how Obi ended up on trial.

The members of the Umuofia Progressive Union (UPU), a group of Umuofia natives who have left their villages to live in major Nigerian cities, have taken up a collection to send Obi to England to study law, in the hope that he will return to help his people by representing them in the colonial legal system, particularly with respect to land cases. However, Obi switches his major to English and meets Clara Okeke, a student nurse, for the first time during a dance.

Obi returns to Nigeria after four years of studies and lives in Lagos with his friend Joseph. He takes a job with the Scholarship Board and is almost immediately offered a bribe by a man who is trying to obtain a scholarship for his sister. When Obi indignantly rejects the offer, he is visited by the girl herself, who implies that she will bribe him with oral sex for the scholarship, another offer Obi rejects.

At the same time, Obi is developing a romantic relationship with Clara who reveals that she is an osu, an outcast by her descent, meaning that Obi cannot marry her under the traditional ways of the Igbos. He remains intent on marrying Clara, but even his Christian father opposes, albeit reluctantly due to his desire to progress and eschew the "heathen" customs of pre-colonial Nigeria. His mother begs him on her deathbed not to marry Clara until after her death, threatening to kill herself if her son disobeys. When Obi informs Clara of these events, Clara breaks the engagement and intimates that she is pregnant. Obi arranges an abortion which Clara reluctantly undergoes, but she suffers complications and refuses to see Obi. Obi descends further into financial trouble, partly due to poor planning on his end, his need to repay his loan to the UPU, to pay for his siblings' education, and in part due to the cost of the illegal abortion.

After hearing of his mother's death, Obi sinks into a deep depression and doesn't go home for the funeral, believing the travel funds would be better served in the funeral and to help out across the household. When he recovers, he begins to accept bribes in a reluctant acknowledgement that it is the way of his world.

The novel closes as Obi takes a bribe and tells himself that it is the last one he will take, only to discover that the bribe was part of a sting operation. He is arrested, bringing us up to the events that opened the story.

== Themes ==
Though set several decades after Things Fall Apart, No Longer at Ease continues many of the themes from Achebe's first novel. Here, the clash between European culture and traditional culture has become entrenched during the long period of colonial rule. Obi struggles to balance the demands of his family and village for monetary support while simultaneously keeping up with the materialism of Western culture.

Furthermore, Achebe depicts a family continuity between Ogbuefi Okonkwo in Things Fall Apart and his grandson Obi Okonkwo in No Longer at Ease. Both men are confrontational, speak their minds, and have some self-destructive tendencies. However, this aggressive streak manifests itself in different ways. Where his grandfather was a man of action and violence, Obi is a man of words and thoughts to the exclusion of action. The story portrays the theme of corruption.

== Reception ==
No Longer at Ease debuted to largely positive reviews. Mercedes Mackay of the Royal African Society noted that "This second novel of Chinua Achebe is better than his first, and puts this Nigerian at the forefront of West African writers." Arthur Lerner of Los Angeles City College wrote that "The second novel of this young Nigerian author continues the promise of its predecessor, Things Fall Apart." The novel was widely praised for its realistic and vivid depictions of life in Lagos in the early 1960s. However, some reviewers felt that Achebe's attention to detail in setting was executed at the expense of fully fleshing out his characters. Ben Mkapa of the W.E.B. DuBois Institute wrote, "Achebe has a broad vision of the world he is writing about, but unfortunately this broadness is manifest at the expense of depth of characterization. Clara, who is so central to Obi's final disillusionment, is but imperfectly drawn; most of the others are only nominal. His characters are representational rather than real."
