= Arrow of God =

1964 novel by Chinua Achebe

- First edition
- Author: Chinua Achebe
- Language: English
- Publisher: Heinemann, London
- Publication date: 1964
- Publication place: UK
- Media type: Print (hardback)
- Pages: 287 pp
- Preceded by: No Longer at Ease
- Followed by: A Man of the People

Arrow of God, published in 1964, is the third novel by Chinua Achebe. Along with Things Fall Apart and No Longer at Ease, it is considered part of The African Trilogy, sharing similar settings and themes. The novel centres on Ezeulu, the chief priest of several Igbo villages in colonial Nigeria, who confronts colonial powers and Christian missionaries in the 1920s. The novel was published as part of the influential Heinemann African Writers Series.

The phrase "Arrow of God" is drawn from an Igbo proverb in which a person, or sometimes an event, is said to represent the will of God. Arrow of God won the first ever Jock Campbell/New Statesman Prize for African writing.

In 2022, it was included on the "Big Jubilee Read" list of 70 books by Commonwealth authors, selected to celebrate the Platinum Jubilee of Elizabeth II.

== Plot summary ==
The novel is set amongst the villages of the Igbo people in colonial Nigeria during the 1920s. Ezeulu is the chief priest of the god Ulu, worshipped by the six villages of Umuaro. The book begins with Ezeulu and Umuaro fighting against a nearby village, Okperi. The conflict is abruptly resolved when T. K. Winterbottom, the British colonial overseer, intervenes.

After the conflict, an indigenous African Christian missionary, John Goodcountry, arrives in Umuaro. Goodcountry begins to tell the villages tales of Nigerians in the Lower Niger who abandoned (and battled) their traditional "bad customs" in favour of Christianity.

Ezeulu is called away from his village by Winterbottom and is invited to become a part of the colonial administration, a policy known as indirect rule. Ezeulu refuses to be a "white man's chief" and is thrown in prison. In Umuaro, the people cannot harvest the yams until Ezeulu has called the New Yam Feast to give thanks to Ulu. When Ezeulu returns from prison, he refuses to call the feast despite being implored by other important men in the village to compromise. Ezeulu reasons to the people and to himself that it is not his will but Ulu's; Ezeulu believes himself to be half spirit and half man. The yams begin to rot in the field, and a famine ensues for which the village blames Ezeulu. Seeing this as an opportunity, John Goodcountry proposes that the village offer thanks to the Christian God instead and they may harvest what remains of their crops with "immunity".

Many of the villagers have already lost their faith in Ezeulu. One of Ezeulu's sons, Obika, dies during a traditional ceremony from a seizure, and the villagers interpret this as a sign that Ulu has taken sides with them against his priest. For this apparent judgement against Ezeulu and the promised immunity by the Christian God, at the Christian harvest, taking place a few days after Obika's death, many men embrace Christianity by sending their son there with yams.

The title Arrow of God refers to Ezeulu's image of himself as an arrow in the bow of his god.

== Themes ==
Ulu, the villages of Umuaro and Okperi, and the colonial officials are all fictional. However, the depiction of colonial Nigeria is accurate in depicting the conflict between the traditional beliefs and religions of the Nigerians and the foreign values introduced by the Europeans, including Christianity. In addition, indirect rule was favoured by the colonial authorities in West Africa as a way to reduce the cost of colonial administration. The novel is considered a work of African literary realism.

Achebe's first novel, Things Fall Apart, tells the tale of Okonkwo, a leader in his community who comes into dispute with the colonial authorities. Arrow of God similarly describes the downfall of a traditional leader at the hands of the colonial authorities. The central conflicts of the novel revolve around the struggle between continuity and change, such as Ezeulu refusing to serve Winterbottom, or between the traditional villagers and Ezeulu's son who studies Christianity. Change is realized as inevitable among the Igbo people.

== Relevant literature ==
- Alimi, S. A. "A Study of the Use of Proverbs as a Literary Device in Achebe's Things Fall Apart and Arrow of God." International Journal of Academic Research in Business and Social Sciences 2, no. 3 (2012): 2222-6990.
- Fagrutheen, Syed. "Downfall of Traditionalism in Things Fall Apart and Arrow of God." The English Literature Journal 1, no. 1 (2014): 21-37.
- Innes, C. L. "A Source for "Arrow of God": A Response." Research in African Literatures 9, no. 1 (1978): 16-18.
- Kalu, Anthonia C. "The priest/artist tradition in Achebe's Arrow of God." Africa Today 41, no. 2 (1994): 51-62.
- Machila, Blaise N. "Ambiguity in Achebe's Arrow of God." Kunapipi 3, no. 1 (1981): 119-133.
- Nnolim, Charles. "A Source for "Arrow of God"." Research in African Literatures 8, no. 1 (1977): 1-26.
- Nwoga, D.I., 1981. The Igbo World of Achebe's "Arrow of God". Research in African Literatures, 12(1), pp.14-42.
