= Things Fall Apart =

1958 novel by Chinua Achebe

- First edition cover
- Author: Chinua Achebe
- Language: English
- Genre: Historical
- Set in: Colonial Nigeria
- Publisher: Heinemann
- Publication date: 17 June 1958
- Publication place: United Kingdom
- Media type: Print (hardback & paperback), e-book
- Pages: 224
- Followed by: No Longer At Ease

Things Fall Apart is the 1958 debut novel by Nigerian author Chinua Achebe. Set in Colonial Nigeria, it portrays the story of Okonkwo, a traditional and influential leader of the fictional Ibo clan (inspired by the real life Igbo clan) of Umuofia, who opposes colonialism and early Christianity. Written when Achebe was working at the Nigerian Broadcasting Corporation, it was first published in London by Heinemann on 17 June 1958.

It was later followed by No Longer at Ease in 1960 and Arrow of God in 1964, which together make up the "African trilogy". The novel's title was taken from a verse of "The Second Coming", a 1919 poem by Irish poet W. B. Yeats.

Things Fall Apart is regarded as a milestone in African literature. It gained critical acclaim and popularity upon publication and has been translated into over fifty languages, making it one of the most translated works of literature in the world. It was listed on Time's "100 Best English-language Novels from 1923 to 2005".

The novel has had several adaptations, including Okonkwo, a 1961 radio drama by the Nigerian Broadcasting Corporation, and Things Fall Apart, a 1971 film that starred Princess Elizabeth of Tooro.

== Plot ==
Okonkwo is a famous man in Umuofia. He is a wrestling champion, acclaimed warrior, and founder of a prosperous family. He strives to be the opposite of his father, Unoka, an indolent debtor unable to support his wife or children, preferring flute-playing and a chronic drinking habit. Okonkwo works hard from a young age to build fame and wealth all on his own. Obsessed with manly strength and discipline, he often beats his wives and children.

Okonkwo is selected by the elders to be the guardian of Ikemefuna, a boy who was taken as a peace settlement between Umuofia and another clan after Ikemefuna's father killed a woman from Umuofia. The boy looks up to Okonkwo as his second father. After three years, the oracle of Umuofia pronounces that the boy must be killed. Ezeudu, the village elder, warns Okonkwo to stay away from the killing, but he ignores the warning and carries out the grim task, not wanting to appear weak. After killing Ikemefuna, Okonkwo feels haunted by sadness and nightmares. During a gun salute at Ezeudu's funeral, Okonkwo's gun accidentally explodes and kills Ezeudu's son. He and his family are exiled for seven years to his mother's ancestral village, Mbanta, as required to appease the gods.

While Okonkwo is in Mbanta, he learns that the White men are living in Umuofia with the intent of introducing their religion, Christianity. As the number of converts increases, the foothold of the White people grows and a new government is introduced. Okonkwo's son Nwoye becomes curious about the missionaries, and after he is beaten by his father for the last time, he decides to leave his family to live independently. Nwoye is introduced to the new religion by Mr. Kiaga, an Igbo missionary. In the last year of his exile, Okonkwo instructs his best friend Obierika to sell all of his yams and hire two men to build him two huts so he can have a house to go back to with his family. He also holds a great feast for his mother's kinsmen.

Returning from Mbanta, Okonkwo finds his village changed by the presence of the White men. After a Christian convert commits the crime of unmasking an elder as he embodies an ancestral spirit of the clan, the village retaliates by destroying a local Christian church. In response, the District Commissioner representing the colonial government takes Okonkwo and several other native leaders prisoner pending payment of a fine of two hundred bags of cowries. Despite the District Commissioner's instructions to treat the leaders of Umuofia with respect, the native "court messengers" refuse them any food or drink and humiliate them, shaving their heads, hitting them with a stick, denying bathroom facilities, and whipping them while also extracting an additional fifty bags of cowries from the payment. Outraged, the people of Umuofia finally gather to decide on a course of action regarding the foreigners. Okonkwo, being a warrior by nature and adamant about following the custom and tradition of Umuofia, despises all cowardice and advocates war.

When messengers of the White government try to stop the meeting, Okonkwo beheads the head messenger who ordered the people to disperse. Because the crowd allows the other messengers to escape and does not fight alongside Okonkwo, he realises in despair that the people of Umuofia will not fight to protect themselves or their religion. Later, when the District Commissioner comes to Okonkwo's house to take him to court, he finds that Okonkwo has killed himself. Among his own people, Okonkwo's actions have tarnished his reputation and status, as it is strictly against the teachings of the Igbo to commit suicide. As the District Commissioner and his men prepare to bury Okonkwo, he muses that Okonkwo's death will make an interesting chapter for his book, The Pacification of the Primitive Tribes of the Lower Niger.

== Background ==
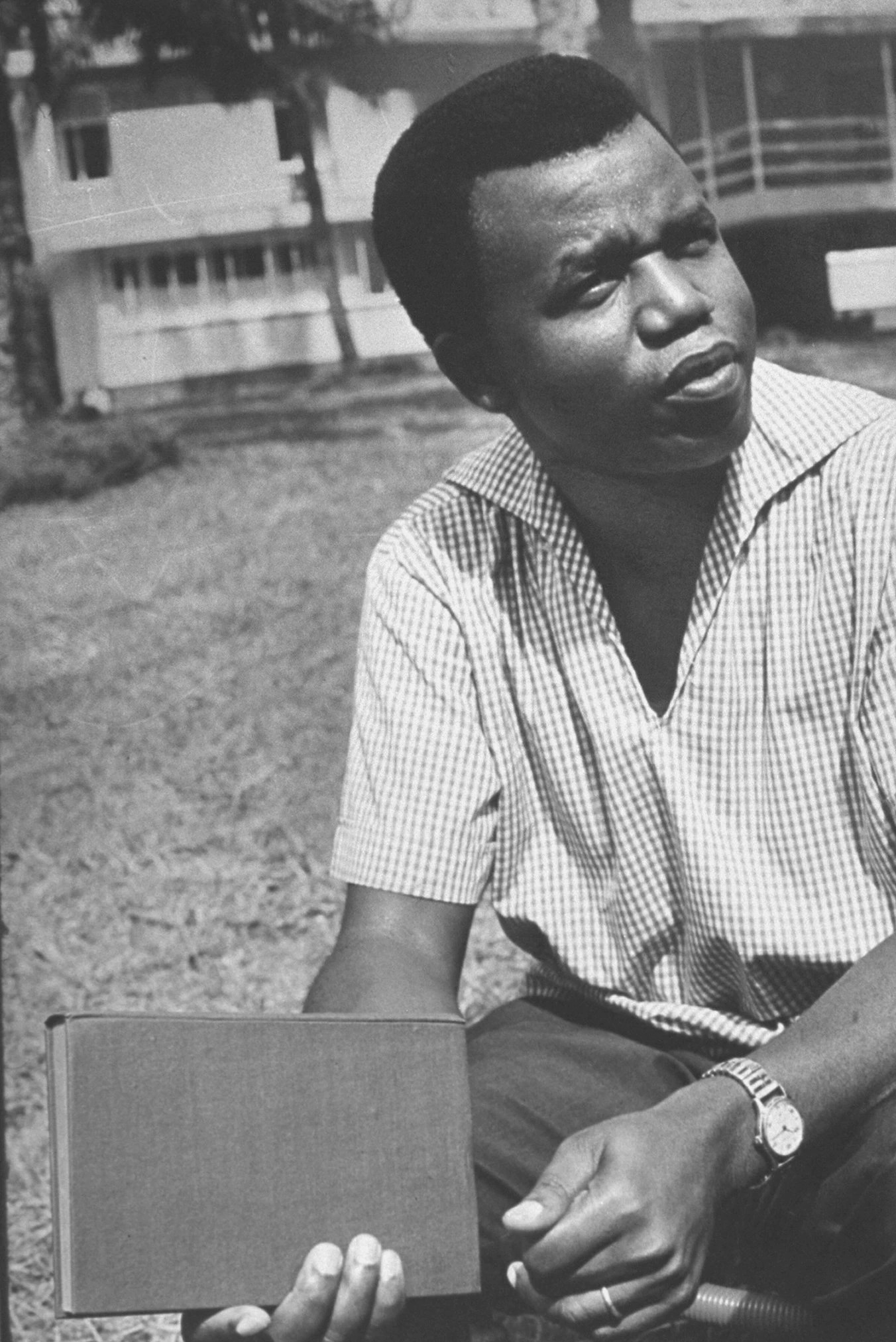
Achebe in Lagos, 1966; eight years after the publication of Things Fall Apart

After graduating from the University of Ibadan in 1953, Achebe became a teacher in Oba, Anambra State, before working in the Nigerian Broadcasting Corporation (NBC) the following year. During his stay at NBC, he started writing the manuscript for his novel. He wrote in English since he considered the existing standard for written Igbo language as stilted, having been created from combining various dialects, which he revealed in a 1994 interview. In 1957, he removed the second and third parts of the manuscript, leaving only the story of Okonkwo, ultimately the main character of the story. He restructured the book and added new paragraphs and chapters.

Achebe saw an advertisement in The Spectator and he sent copies of his handwritten manuscript to a typing agency in London by ordinary mail. After he sent the requested fee of £22 by the agency through the British postal order, he heard nothing from the agency for many months. Towards the end of the year, his colleague, Angela Beattie, who was about to relinquish her post as Head of Talks at NBC, was going to London for her annual leave. Achebe asked her to check the status of his manuscript when she reached London. Following Beattie's intervention, the agency retrieved the manuscripts already covered with dust from a corner of the office and sent only one typed copy to Achebe in Lagos.

Achebe was promoted as the Head of Talks at NBC. During that period, he sent his typescript to the literary agent of Gilbert Phelps in 1958. Several publishing houses rejected the typescript, giving the reason that fiction by African writers possessed no financial potential. The typescript was eventually taken to the office of William Heinemann, where it was presented to James Michie and, through him, came to the attention of Alan Hill, a publishing advisor. The manuscript was eventually published as Things Fall Apart' in hardback on 17 June 1958 with around 2000 print copies. It achieved instant acclaim in the British national press.

== Themes ==
Things Fall Apart depicts the Igbo culture as a way to revive the lost dignity of the Igbo people during colonisation. In talking about race, Achebe said:

Africans are people in the same way that Americans, Europeans, Asians, and others are people. Although the action of Things Fall Apart takes place in a setting with which most Americans are unfamiliar, the characters are normal people who undergo real life experiences. The necessity even to say this is part of a burden imposed on us by the customary denigration of Africa in the popular imagination of the West.

The novel portrayed the Igbo people as isolated within their established culture. There is a contradiction between different cultural practices, especially the African and Western culture; for example, the Europeans allow men to fight over religion, but the Igbo tradition forbids the killing of one another. He uses both cultures to represent two mixtures of human beings, as seen in Okonkwo and Mr. Smith, who both refuse to compromise when their cultures are threatened.

== Legacy ==
External videos
- Discussion on the 50th anniversary on Things Fall Apart featuring Achebe, 24 March 2008, C-SPAN

Things Fall Apart is regarded as a milestone in Anglophone African literature, and for the perception of African literature in the West. It has been translated into over 50 languages. While not the first major African novelist, Achebe self-consciously defined the political role of African writers and established a model for the continent's postcolonial literature.

Achebe's fiction and criticism continue to inspire and influence writers around the world. Hilary Mantel, the Booker Prize-winning novelist in a 7 May 2012 article in Newsweek lists Things Fall Apart as one of her five favourite novels in this genre. Caine Prize winners Binyavanga Wainaina and Helon Habila, Uzodinma Iweala, and Okey Ndibe have cited Achebe as an influence.

During the 60th anniversary of the novel, it was read at the South Bank Centre in London on 15 April 2018 by Femi Elufowoju Jr, Adesua Etomi, Lucian Msamati, Jennifer Nansubuga Makumbi, Chibundu Onuzo, Ellah Wakatama Allfrey, Ben Okri, and Margaret Busby. Things Fall Apart' was listed by Time in its TIME 100 Best English-language Novels from 1923 to 2005. On 5 November 2019, BBC listed the novel on its list of the 100 most influential novels. It was also listed by Britannica as one of the 12 "Greatest Books Ever Written". In 2024, the novel was recognised as one of the 50 Most Influential Books of All Time by the Open Education Data Base (OEDB).

Things Fall Apart has influenced subsequent African authors' style, language, and themes, as Chimamanda Ngozi Adichie observes in a CNN interview. Simon Gikandi describes Things Fall Apart as seminal, recognizing Achebe as "one of Africa's most important and influential writers."

== Adaptations ==
Things Fall Apart was adapted into a radio drama, Okonkwo, by the Nigerian Broadcasting Corporation in April 1961. It featured Nigerian playwright and poet Wole Soyinka in a supporting role.

In 1965, Nigerian co-producer Francis Oladele founded Calpenny Nigeria Limited, the first film production company in Nigeria after independence. He produced Things Fall Apart, a film considered his second after Kongi's Harvest.

In 1970, the novel was turned into a film of the same name. The film was also called Bullfrog In The Sun, and was directed by the German filmmaker and producer Hansjürgen Pohland and starred Princess Elizabeth of Toro, Johnny Sekka, and Orlando Martins.

In 1987, the novel was adapted by director David Orere into a television miniseries broadcast by the Nigerian Television Authority. It starred Pete Edochie as Okonkwo and Justus Esiri as Obierika. Others included Nkem Owoh and Sam Loco Efe in supporting roles.

In 1999, the American hip-hop band The Roots released a studio album of the same name as the novel. In the same year, a theatrical production of the novel as adapted by Biyi Bandele was performed at Kennedy Center. In September 2024, a television adaptation was announced to be in development at A24 with Idris Elba and David Oyelowo as the producers.

In 2011, Roger Craig Vogel composed Things Fall Apart, a song cycle with voice, flute, percussion and piano. Bass-baritone soloist Odekhiren Amaize commissioned and premiered the work.

== Works cited ==
- Fagan, Hannah (2 September 2025). "Spectres of the District Commissioner: The Negotiation of Achebe's Things Fall Apart in Contemporary African Historical Fiction". Textual Practice. 39 (9). Routledge: 1478–1493. doi:10.1080/0950236X.2025.2547546. ISSN 0950-236X.
- Rhoads, Diana Akers (1993). "Culture in Chinua Achebe's Things Fall Apart". African Studies Review. 36 (2): 61–72. doi:10.2307/524733. JSTOR 524733.
- Ezenwa-Ohaeto (1997). Chinua Achebe: A Biography. Bloomington: Indiana University Press. ISBN 978-0-253-33342-1. Archived from the original on 9 May 2021.
