= Chinua Achebe =

Nigerian author and literary critic (1930–2013)

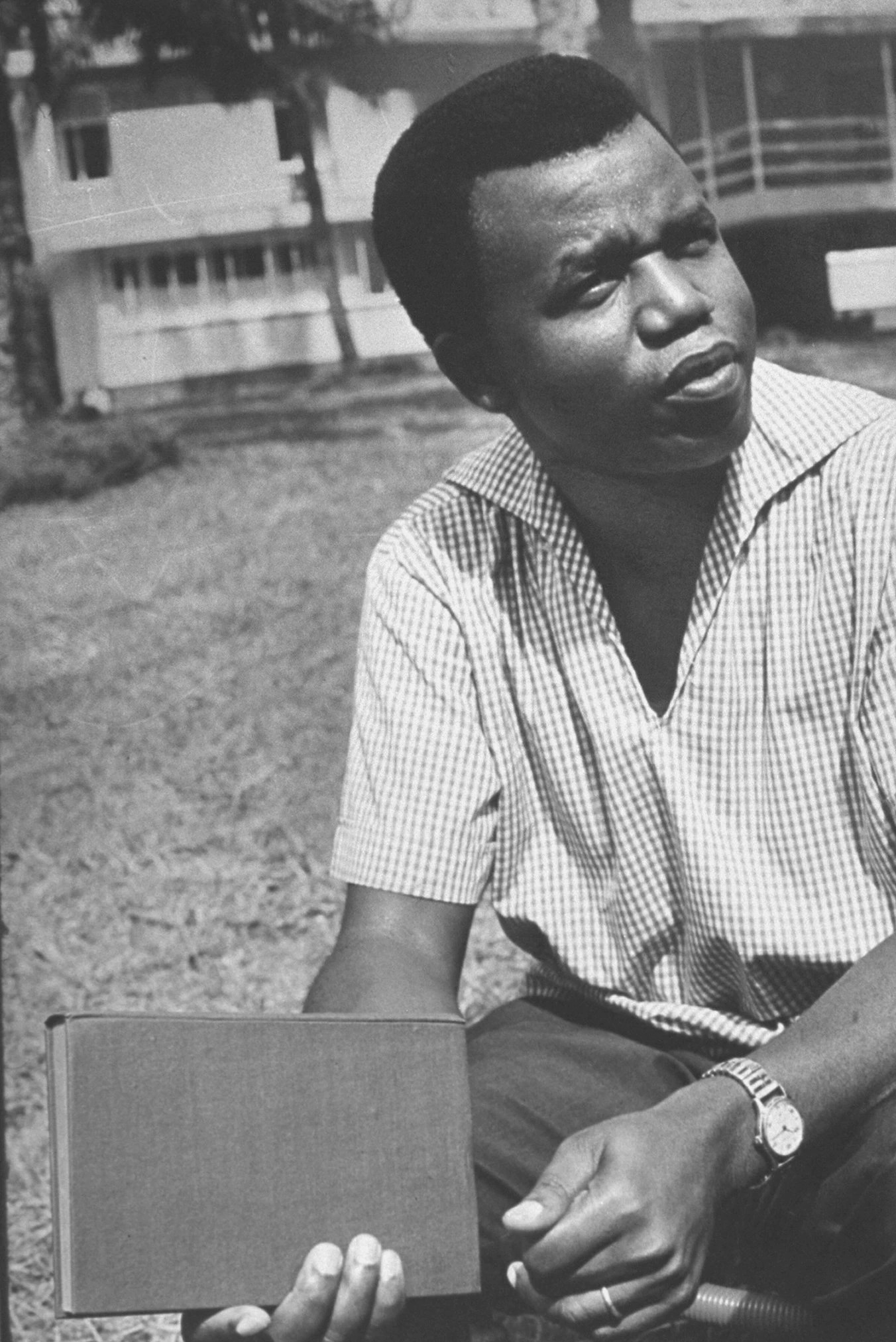
- Achebe in 1966
- Born: Albert Chinụalụmọgụ Achebe; 16 November 1930; Ogidi, Colonial Nigeria
- Died: 21 March 2013 (aged 82); Boston, Massachusetts, U.S.
- Education: University of Ibadan
- Children: 4, including Chidi Chike and Nwando
- Writing career
- Notable works: "The African Trilogy": Things Fall Apart (1958); No Longer at Ease (1960); Arrow of God (1964); A Man of the People (1966); Anthills of the Savannah (1987)

Chinua Achebe (/ˈtʃɪnwɑː əˈtʃɛbeɪ/; born Albert Chinụalụmọgụ Achebe; 16 November 1930 – 21 March 2013) was a Nigerian novelist, poet, and critic who is regarded as a central figure of modern African literature. His first novel and magnum opus, Things Fall Apart (1958), occupies a pivotal place in African literature and remains the most widely studied, translated, and read African novel. Along with Things Fall Apart, his No Longer at Ease (1960) and Arrow of God (1964) complete the "African Trilogy". Later novels include A Man of the People (1966) and Anthills of the Savannah (1987). Achebe is often referred to as the "father of modern African literature", although he vigorously rejected the characterization.

Born in Ogidi, Colonial Nigeria, Achebe was influenced in his childhood by both Igbo traditional culture and colonial Christianity. He excelled in school and attended what is now the University of Ibadan, where he became fiercely critical of how Western literature depicted Africa. Moving to Lagos after graduation, he worked for the Nigerian Broadcasting Service (NBS) and garnered international attention for his 1958 novel Things Fall Apart. In less than 10 years, he would publish four further novels through the publisher Heinemann, with whom he began the Heinemann African Writers Series and galvanized the careers of African writers, such as Ngũgĩ wa Thiong'o and Flora Nwapa.

Achebe sought to escape the colonial perspective that framed African literature at the time, and drew from the traditions of the Igbo people, Christian influences, and the clash of Western and African values to create a uniquely African voice. He wrote in and defended the use of English, describing it as a means to reach a broad audience, particularly readers of colonial nations. In 1975 he gave a controversial lecture, "An Image of Africa: Racism in Conrad's Heart of Darkness", which was a landmark in postcolonial discourse. Published in The Massachusetts Review, it featured criticism of Albert Schweitzer and Joseph Conrad, whom Achebe described as "a thoroughgoing racist". When the region of Biafra broke away from Nigeria in 1967, Achebe supported Biafran independence and acted as ambassador for the people of the movement. The subsequent Nigerian Civil War ravaged the populace, and he appealed to the people of Europe and the Americas for aid. When the Nigerian government retook the region in 1970, he involved himself in political parties but soon became disillusioned by his frustration over the continuous corruption and elitism he witnessed. He lived in the United States for several years in the 1970s, and returned to the US in 1990 after a car crash left him partially paralyzed. He stayed in the US in a nineteen-year tenure at Bard College as a professor of Languages and Literature.

After winning the 2007 Man Booker International Prize, from 2009 until his death, he was professor of African studies at Brown University. Achebe's work has been extensively analyzed and a vast body of scholarly work discussing it has arisen. In addition to his seminal novels, Achebe's oeuvre includes numerous short stories, poetry, essays and children's books. A titled Igbo chief himself, his style relies heavily on the Igbo oral tradition, and combines straightforward narration with representations of folk stories, proverbs, and oratory. Among the many themes his works cover are culture and colonialism, masculinity and femininity, politics, and history. His legacy is celebrated annually at the Chinua Achebe Literary Festival.

== Life and career ==
=== Youth and background (1939–1947) ===
Map of Nigeria's linguistic groups. Achebe's homeland, the Igbo region (archaically spelt Ibo), lies in the central south.

Chinua Achebe was born on 16 November 1930 and baptised Albert Chinụalụmọgụ Achebe. (Note: Chinua's unabbreviated name, Chinụalụmọgụ ("God is fighting on my behalf") was a prayer for divine protection and stability.) His father, Isaiah Okafo Achebe, was a teacher and evangelist, while his mother, Janet Anaenechi Iloegbunam, was the daughter of a blacksmith from Awka, a leader among church women, and a vegetable farmer. His birthplace was Saint Simon's Church, Nneobi, which was near the Igbo village of Ogidi; the area was part of the British colony of Nigeria at the time. Isaiah was the nephew of Udoh Osinyi, a titled leader in Ogidi with a "reputation for tolerance"; orphaned as a young man, Isaiah was an early Ogidi convert to Christianity. Both Isaiah and Janet stood at a crossroads of traditional culture and Christian influence, which made a significant impact on the children, especially Chinua. His parents were converts to the Protestant Church Mission Society (CMS) in Nigeria. As such, Isaiah stopped practising Odinani, the religious practices of his ancestors, but continued to respect its traditions due to the influence of his uncle Chief Udoh, who himself refused to convert to the new faith. The Achebe family had five other surviving children, named in a fusion of traditional words relating to their new religion: Frank Okwuofu, John Chukwuemeka Ifeanyichukwu, Zinobia Uzoma, Augustine Ndubisi, and Grace Nwanneka. After the youngest daughter was born, the family moved to Isaiah Achebe's ancestral town of Ogidi, in what is now the state of Anambra.

Storytelling was a mainstay of the Igbo tradition and an integral part of the community. Achebe's mother and his sister Zinobia told him many stories as a child, which he repeatedly requested. His education was furthered by the collages his father hung on the walls of their home, as well as almanacs and numerous books—including a prose adaptation of Shakespeare's A Midsummer Night's Dream (c. 1590) and an Igbo version of Bunyan's The Pilgrim's Progress (1678). Achebe eagerly anticipated traditional village events, like the constant masquerade ceremonies, which he would later recreate in his novels and stories.

In 1936, Achebe entered St Philips' Central School in the Akpakaogwe region of Ogidi for his primary education. Despite his protests, he spent a week in the religious class for young children, but was quickly moved to a higher class when the school's chaplain took note of his intelligence. One teacher described him as the student with the best handwriting and the best reading skills in his class. Achebe had his secondary education at the prestigious Government College Umuahia, in Nigeria's present-day Abia State. He attended Sunday school every week and the special services held monthly, often carrying his father's bag. A controversy erupted at one such session, when apostates from the new church challenged the catechist about the tenets of Christianity. (Note: Achebe later included a scene based on this incident in his debut novel Things Fall Apart. (Note: Achebe 1994, pp. 146–147)) Achebe enrolled in Nekede Central School, outside of Owerri, in 1942; he was particularly studious and passed the entrance examinations for two colleges.

=== University (1948–1953) ===
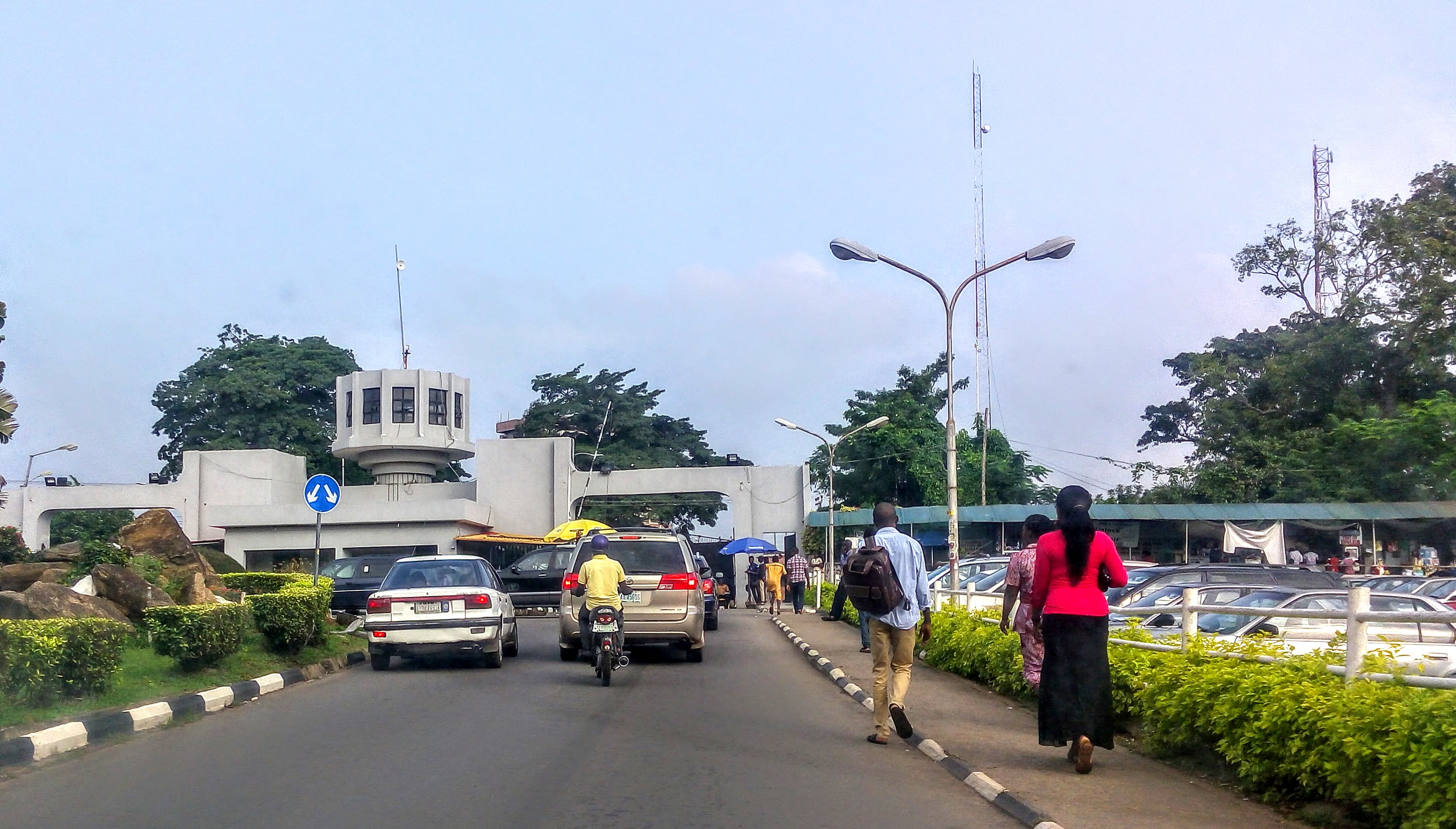
The Gate of the University of Ibadan, 2016

In 1948, Nigeria's first university opened in preparation for the country's independence. Known as University College (now the University of Ibadan), it was an associate college of the University of London. Achebe was admitted as the university's first intake and given a bursary to study medicine. During his studies, Achebe became critical of Western literature about Africa, particularly Joseph Conrad's Heart of Darkness. He decided to become a writer after reading Mister Johnson by Joyce Cary because of the book's portrayal of its Nigerian characters as either savages or buffoons. Achebe recognised his dislike for the African protagonist as a sign of the author's cultural ignorance. He abandoned medicine to study English, history, and theology, a switch which lost him his scholarship and required extra tuition fees. To compensate, the government provided a bursary, and his family donated money—his older brother Augustine gave up money for a trip home from his job as a civil servant so Achebe could continue his studies.

Achebe's debut as an author was in 1950 when he wrote a piece for the University Herald, the university's magazine, entitled "Polar Undergraduate". It used irony and humour to celebrate the intellectual vigour of his classmates. He followed with other essays and letters about philosophy and freedom in academia, some of which were published in another campus magazine called The Bug. He served as the Herald's editor during the 1951–52 school year. He wrote his first short story that year, "In a Village Church" (1951), an amusing look at the Igbo synthesis between life in rural Nigeria with Christian institutions and icons. Other short stories he wrote during his time at Ibadan—including "The Old Order in Conflict with the New" (1952) and "Dead Men's Path" (1953)—examine conflicts between tradition and modernity, with an eye toward dialogue and understanding on both sides. When the professor Geoffrey Parrinder arrived at the university to teach comparative religion, Achebe began to explore the fields of Christian history and African traditional religions.

After the final examinations at Ibadan in year 1953, Achebe was awarded a second-class degree. Rattled by not receiving the highest level, he was uncertain how to proceed after graduation and returned to his hometown of Ogidi. While pondering possible career paths, Achebe was visited by a friend from the university, who convinced him to apply for an English teaching position at the Merchants of Light school at Oba. It was a ramshackle institution with a crumbling infrastructure and a meagre library; the school was built on what the residents called "bad bush"—a section of land thought to be tainted by unfriendly spirits.

=== Teaching and producing (1953–1956) ===
Lagos, Nigeria, pictured in 1962

As a teacher he urged his students to read extensively and be original in their work. The students did not have access to the newspapers he had read as a student, so Achebe made his own available in the classroom. He taught in Oba for four months. He left the institution in 1954 and moved to Lagos to work for the Nigerian Broadcasting Service (NBS), a radio network started in 1933 by the colonial government. He was assigned to the Talks Department to prepare scripts for oral delivery. This helped him master the subtle nuances between written and spoken language, a skill that helped him later to write realistic dialogue.

Lagos made a significant impression on him. A huge conurbation, the city teemed with recent migrants from the rural villages. Achebe revelled in the social and political activity around him and began work on a novel. This was challenging since very little African fiction had been written in English, although Amos Tutuola's Palm-Wine Drinkard and Cyprian Ekwensi's People of the City were notable exceptions. A visit to Nigeria by Queen Elizabeth II in 1956 highlighted issues of colonialism and politics, and was a significant moment for Achebe.

Also in 1956, Achebe was selected to attend the staff training school for the BBC. His first trip outside Nigeria was an opportunity to advance his technical production skills, and to solicit feedback on his novel (which was later split into two books). In London, he met the novelist Gilbert Phelps, to whom he offered the manuscript. Phelps responded with great enthusiasm, asking Achebe if he could show it to his editor and publishers. Achebe declined, insisting that it needed more work.

=== Things Fall Apart (1957–1960) ===
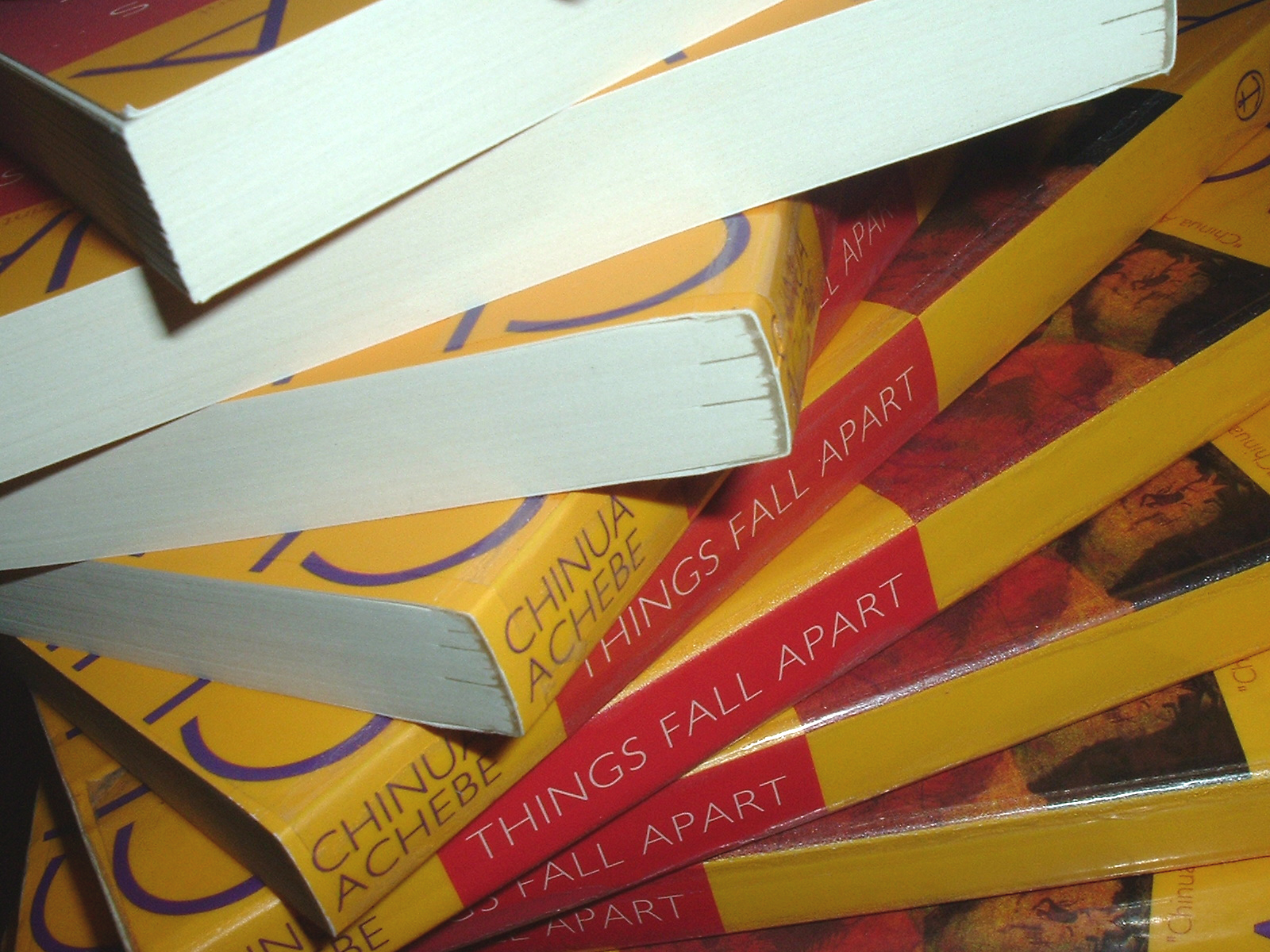
A spiral stack of the 1994 Anchor Books edition of Things Fall Apart

Back in Nigeria, Achebe set to work revising and editing his novel; he titled it Things Fall Apart, after a line in the poem "The Second Coming" by W. B. Yeats. He cut away the second and third sections of the book, leaving only the story of a yam farmer named Okonkwo who lives during the colonization of Nigeria and struggles with his father's debtor legacy. He added sections, improved various chapters, and restructured the prose.

In 1957 he sent his only copy of his handwritten manuscript (along with the £22 fee) to a London manuscript typing service he had seen an advertisement for in The Spectator. He did not receive a reply from the typing service, so he asked his boss at the NBS, Angela Beattie, to visit the company during her travels to London. She did, and angrily demanded to know why the manuscript was lying ignored in the corner of the office. The company quickly sent a typed copy to Achebe. Beattie's intervention was crucial for his ability to continue as a writer. Had the novel been lost, he later said, "I would have been so discouraged that I would probably have given up altogether." The next year Achebe sent his novel to the agent recommended by Gilbert Phelps in London. It was sent to several publishing houses; some rejected it immediately, claiming that fiction from African writers had no market potential. The executives at Heinemann read the manuscript and hesitated in their decision to publish the book. An educational adviser, Donald MacRae, read the book and reported to the company that: "This is the best novel I have read since the war." Heinemann published 2,000 hardcover copies of Things Fall Apart on 17 June 1958. According to Alan Hill, employed by the publisher at the time, the company did not "touch a word of it" in preparation for release.

The book was received well by the British press, and received positive reviews from critic Walter Allen and novelist Angus Wilson. Three days after publication, The Times Literary Supplement wrote that the book "genuinely succeeds in presenting tribal life from the inside". The Observer called it "an excellent novel", and the literary magazine Time and Tide said that "Mr. Achebe's style is a model for aspirants". Initial reception in Nigeria was mixed. When Hill tried to promote the book in West Africa, he was met with scepticism and ridicule. The faculty at the University of Ibadan was amused at the thought of a worthwhile novel being written by an alumnus. Others were more supportive; one review in the magazine Black Orpheus said: "The book as a whole creates for the reader such a vivid picture of Igbo life that the plot and characters are little more than symbols representing a way of life lost irrevocably within living memory." When Things Fall Apart was published in 1958, Achebe was promoted at the NBS and put in charge of the network's Eastern region coverage. That same year Achebe began dating Christiana Chinwe (Christie) Okoli, a woman who had grown up in the area and joined the NBS staff when he arrived. The couple moved to Enugu and began to work on his administrative duties.

=== No Longer at Ease and fellowship travels (1960–1961) ===
In 1960 Achebe published No Longer at Ease, a novel about a civil servant named Obi, grandson of Things Fall Apart's main character, who is embroiled in the corruption of Lagos. Obi undergoes the same turmoil as much of the Nigerian youth of his time; the clash between the traditional culture of his clan, family, and home village against his government job and modern society. Later that year, Achebe was awarded a Rockefeller Fellowship for six months of travel, which he called "the first important perk of my writing career".

Achebe used the fellowship to tour East Africa. He first travelled to Kenya, where he was required to complete an immigration form by checking a box indicating his ethnicity: European, Asiatic, Arab, or Other. Shocked and dismayed at being forced into an "Other" identity, he found the situation "almost funny" and took an extra form as a souvenir. Continuing to Tanganyika and Zanzibar (now united in Tanzania), he was frustrated by the paternalistic attitude he observed among non-African hotel clerks and social elites. Achebe found in his travels that Swahili was gaining prominence as a major African language. Radio programs were broadcast in Swahili, and its use was widespread in the countries he visited. Nevertheless, he found an "apathy" among the people toward literature written in Swahili. He met the poet Sheikh Shaaban Robert, who complained of the difficulty he had faced in trying to publish his Swahili-language work. In Northern Rhodesia (now called Zambia), Achebe found himself sitting in a whites-only section of a bus to Victoria Falls. Interrogated by the ticket taker as to why he was sitting in the front, he replied, "if you must know I come from Nigeria, and there we sit where we like in the bus." Upon reaching the waterfall, he was cheered by the black travellers from the bus, but he was saddened by their being unable to resist the policy of segregation at the time.

Two years later, Achebe travelled to the United States and Brazil as part of a Fellowship for Creative Artists awarded by UNESCO. He met with a number of writers from the US, including novelists Ralph Ellison and Arthur Miller. In Brazil, he discussed the complications of writing in Portuguese with other authors. Achebe worried that the vibrant literature of the nation would be lost if left untranslated into a more widely spoken language.

=== Voice of Nigeria and African Writers Series (1961–1964) ===
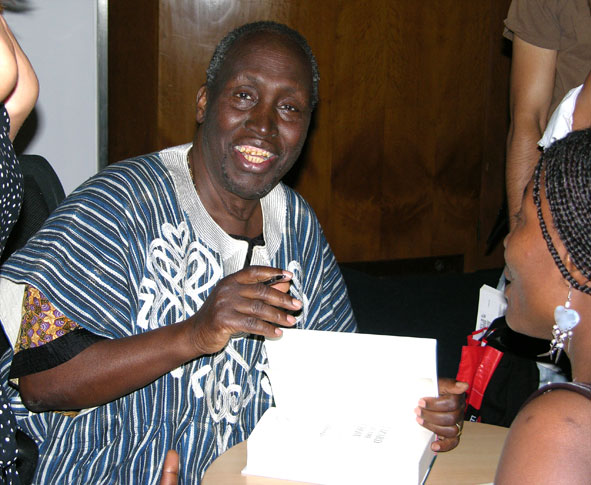
Achebe selected the novel Weep Not, Child by Ngũgĩ wa Thiong'o (pictured) as one of the first titles of Heinemann's African Writers Series.

On his return to Nigeria in 1961, Achebe was promoted at the NBS to the position of Director of External Broadcasting. One of his primary duties was to help create the Voice of Nigeria (VON) network, which broadcast its first transmission on New Year's Day 1962. VON struggled to maintain neutrality when Nigerian prime minister Abubakar Tafawa Balewa declared a state of emergency in the Western Region, responding to a series of conflicts between officials of varying parties. Achebe became particularly saddened by the evidence of corruption and silencing of political opposition. The same year he attended an executive conference of African writers in English at the Makerere University College in Kampala, Uganda. He met with literary figures including Ghanaian poet Kofi Awoonor, Nigerian playwright and novelist Wole Soyinka, and American poet Langston Hughes. Among the topics of discussion was an attempt to determine whether the term African literature ought to include work from the diaspora, or solely that writing composed by people living within the continent itself. Achebe indicated that it was not "a very significant question", and that scholars would do well to wait until a body of work was large enough to judge. Writing about the conference in several journals, Achebe hailed it as a milestone for the literature of Africa, and highlighted the importance of community among isolated voices on the continent and beyond.

While at Makerere, Achebe was asked to read a novel written by a student named James Ngugi (later known as Ngũgĩ wa Thiong'o) called Weep Not, Child. Impressed, he sent it to Alan Hill at Heinemann, which published it two years later to coincide with its paperback line of books from African writers. Achebe also recommended works by Flora Nwapa. Achebe became the General Editor of the African Writers Series, a collection of postcolonial literature from African writers. As these works became more widely available, reviews and essays about African literature—especially from Europe—began to flourish.

Achebe published an essay entitled "Where Angels Fear to Tread" in the December 1962 issue of Nigeria Magazine in reaction to critiques African work was receiving from international authors. The essay distinguished between the hostile critic (entirely negative), the amazed critic (entirely positive), and the conscious critic (who seeks a balance). He lashed out at those who critiqued African writers from the outside, saying: "no man can understand another whose language he does not speak (and 'language' here does not mean simply words, but a man's entire worldview)." In September 1964 he attended the Commonwealth Literature conference at the University of Leeds, presenting his essay "The Novelist as Teacher".

==== Personal life ====
Achebe and Christie married on 10 September 1961, holding the ceremony in the Chapel of Resurrection on the campus of the University of Ibadan. Their first child, a daughter named Chinelo, was born on 11 July 1962. They had a son, Ikechukwu, on 3 December 1964, and another boy, Chidi, on 24 May 1967. Their last child, a daughter, named Nwando, was born on 7 March 1970. When the children began attending school in Lagos, their parents became worried about the worldview—especially with regard to race, gender and how Africans were portrayed—expressed at the school, particularly through the mostly white teachers and books that presented a prejudiced view of African life. In 1966, Achebe published his first children's book, Chike and the River, to address some of these concerns.

=== Arrow of God (1964–1966) ===
Achebe's third book, Arrow of God, was published in 1964. The idea for the novel came in 1959, when Achebe heard the story of a chief priest being imprisoned by a district officer. He drew further inspiration a year later when he viewed a collection of Igbo objects excavated from the area by archaeologist Thurstan Shaw; Achebe was startled by the cultural sophistication of the artefacts. When an acquaintance showed him a series of papers from colonial officers, Achebe combined these strands of history and began work on Arrow of God. Like Achebe's previous works, Arrow was roundly praised by critics. A revised edition was published in 1974 to correct what Achebe called "certain structural weaknesses".

Like its predecessors, the work explores the intersections of Igbo tradition and European Christianity. Set in the village of Umuaro at the start of the twentieth century, the novel tells the story of Ezeulu, a chief Priest of Ulu. Shocked by the power of British Empire, he orders his son to learn the foreigners' secrets. Ezeulu is consumed by the resulting tragedy. In a letter written to Achebe, American writer John Updike expressed his surprised admiration for the sudden downfall of Arrow of God's protagonist and praised the author's courage to write "an ending few Western novelists would have contrived". Achebe responded by suggesting that the individualistic hero was rare in African literature, given its roots in communal living and the degree to which characters are "subject to non-human forces in the universe".

=== A Man of the People (1966–1967) ===
Achebe's fourth novel, A Man of the People, was published in 1966. A bleak satire set in an unnamed African state which has just attained independence, the novel follows a teacher named Odili Samalu from the village of Anata who opposes a corrupt Minister of Culture named Nanga for his Parliament seat. Upon reading an advance copy of the novel, Achebe's friend John Pepper Clark declared: "Chinua, I know you are a prophet. Everything in this book has happened except a military coup!" Soon afterwards, Nigerian Army officer Chukwuma Kaduna Nzeogwu seized control of the northern region of the country as part of the 1966 Nigerian coup d'état. Commanders in other areas failed, and the coup was followed by a military crackdown. A massacre of three thousand people from the eastern region living in the north occurred soon afterwards, and stories of other attacks on Igbo Nigerians began to filter into Lagos.

The ending of his novel had brought Achebe to the attention of the Nigerian Armed Forces, who suspected him of having foreknowledge of the coup. When he received word of the pursuit, he sent his wife (who was pregnant) and children on a squalid boat through a series of unseen creeks to the Eastern stronghold of Port Harcourt. They arrived safely, but Christie suffered a miscarriage at the journey's end. Chinua rejoined them soon afterwards in Ogidi. These cities were safe from military incursion because they were in the southeast, a part of the region that would later secede.

Once the family had resettled in Enugu, Achebe and his friend Christopher Okigbo started a publishing house called Citadel Press to improve the quality and increase the quantity of literature available to younger readers. One of its first submissions was a story called How the Dog was Domesticated, which Achebe revised and rewrote, turning it into a complex allegory for the country's political tumult. Its final title was How the Leopard Got His Claws. Years later a Nigerian intelligence officer told Achebe, "of all the things that came out of Biafra, that book was most important."

=== Nigeria-Biafra War (1967–1970) ===
Map of the Biafra secession in June 1967 that caused the ensuing Nigerian Civil War

In May 1967, the southeastern region of Nigeria broke away to form the Republic of Biafra; in July the Nigerian military attacked to suppress what it considered an unlawful rebellion. The Achebe family narrowly escaped disaster several times during the war, including a bombing of their house. In August 1967, Okigbo was killed fighting in the war. Achebe was shaken considerably by the loss; in 1971 he wrote "Dirge for Okigbo", originally in the Igbo language but later translated to English.

As the war intensified, the Achebe family was forced to leave Enugu for the Biafran capital of Aba. He continued to write throughout the war, but most of his creative work during this time took the form of poetry. The shorter format was a consequence of living in a war zone. "I can write poetry," he said, "something short, intense more in keeping with my mood [...] All this is creating in the context of our struggle." Many of these poems were collected in his 1971 book Beware, Soul Brother. One of his most famous, "Refugee Mother and Child", spoke to the suffering and loss that surrounded him. Dedicated to the promise of Biafra, he accepted a request to serve as foreign ambassador, refusing an invitation from the Program of African Studies at Northwestern University in the US. (Note: During the war, relations between writers in Nigeria and Biafra were strained. Achebe and John Pepper Clark had a tense confrontation in London over their respective support for opposing sides of the conflict. Achebe demanded that the publisher withdraw the dedication of A Man of the People he had given to Clark. Years later, their friendship healed and the dedication was restored.) Meanwhile, their contemporary Wole Soyinka was imprisoned for meeting with Biafran officials and spent two years in jail. Speaking in 1968, Achebe said: "I find the Nigerian situation untenable. If I had been a Nigerian, I think I would have been in the same situation as Wole Soyinka is—in prison." In his ambassador role, Achebe travelled to European and North American cities to promote the Biafra cause.

An interview with Achebe on WOI-TV

Conditions in Biafra worsened as the war continued. In September 1968, the city of Aba fell to the Nigerian military and Achebe once again moved his family, this time to Umuahia, where the Biafran government had relocated. He was chosen to chair the newly formed National Guidance Committee, charged with the task of drafting principles and ideas for the post-war era. In 1969, the group completed a document entitled The Principles of the Biafran Revolution, later released as The Ahiara Declaration. In October of the same year, Achebe joined writers Cyprian Ekwensi and Gabriel Okara for a tour of the United States to raise awareness about the dire situation in Biafra. They visited thirty college campuses and conducted numerous interviews. Although the group was well received by students and faculty, Achebe was shocked by the harsh racist attitude toward Africa he saw in the US. At the end of the tour, he said that "world policy is absolutely ruthless and unfeeling".

The beginning of 1970 saw the end of the state of Biafra. On 12 January, the military surrendered to Nigeria, and Achebe returned with his family to Ogidi, where their home had been destroyed. He took a job at the University of Nigeria in Nsukka and immersed himself once again in academia. He was unable to accept invitations to other countries, however, because the Nigerian government revoked his passport due to his support for Biafra. The Achebe family had another daughter on 7 March 1970, named Nwando.

=== Postwar academia (1971–1975) ===
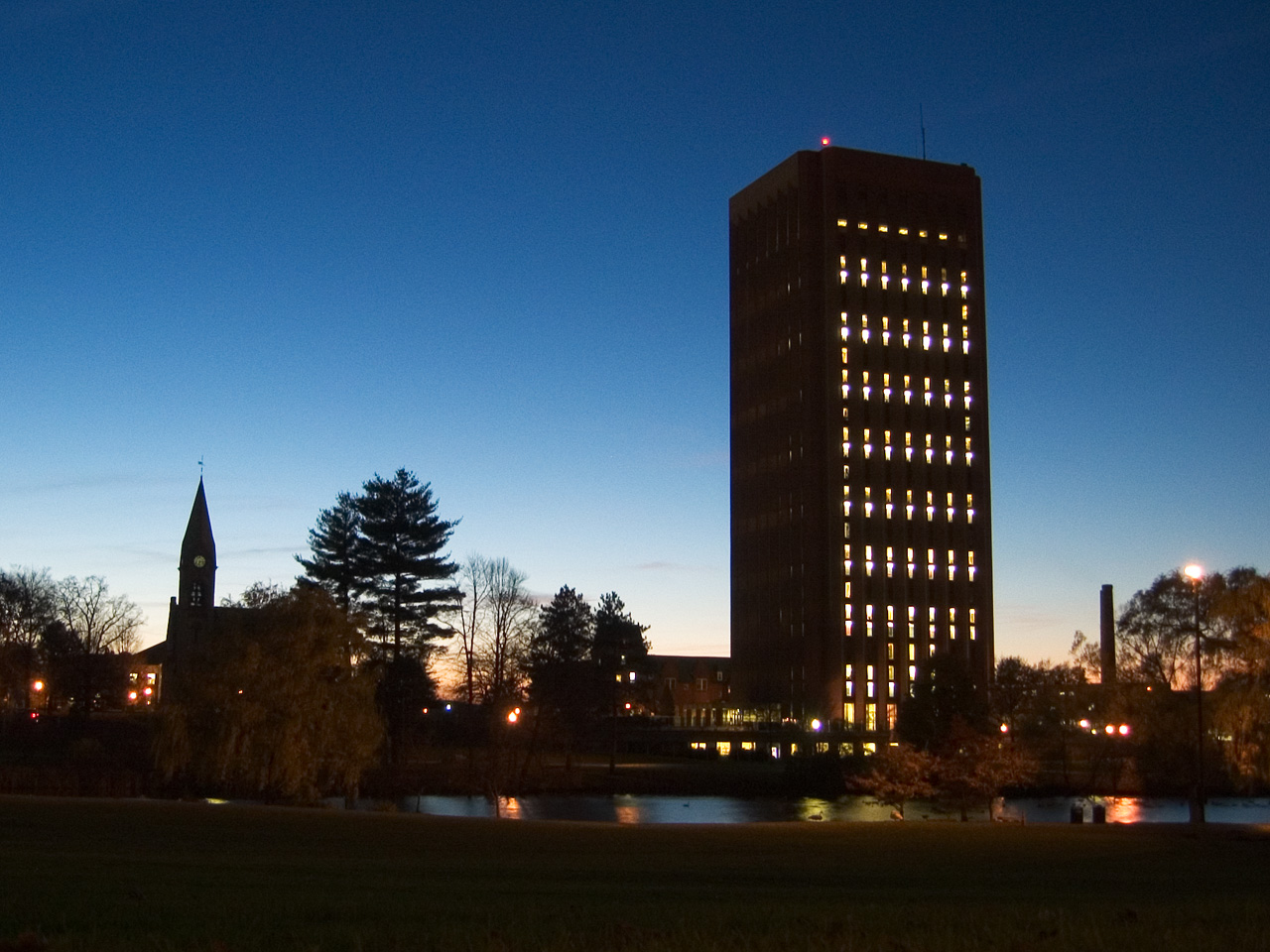
The University of Massachusetts Amherst at night

After the war, Achebe helped start two magazines in 1971: the literary journal Okike, a forum for African art, fiction, and poetry; and Nsukkascope, an internal publication of the university. Achebe and the Okike committee later established another cultural magazine, Uwa Ndi Igbo, to showcase the indigenous stories and oral traditions of the Igbo community. Achebe handed over the editorship of Okike to Onuora Osmond Enekwe, who was later assisted by Amechi Akwanya. In February 1972, Chinua Achebe released Girls at War, a collection of short stories ranging in time from his undergraduate days to the recent bloodshed. It was the 100th book in Heinemann's African Writers Series.

The University of Massachusetts Amherst offered Achebe a professorship in September 1972, and the family moved to the United States. Their youngest daughter was displeased with her nursery school, and the family soon learned that her frustration involved language. Achebe helped her face what he called the "alien experience" by telling her stories during the car trips to and from school. As he presented his lessons to a wide variety of students (he taught only one class, to a large audience), he began to study the perceptions of Africa in Western scholarship: "Africa is not like anywhere else they know [...] there are no real people in the Dark Continent, only forces operating; and people don't speak any language you can understand, they just grunt, too busy jumping up and down in a frenzy".

==== Further criticism (1975) ====
Achebe expanded this criticism when he presented a Chancellor's Lecture at Amherst on 18 February 1975, "An Image of Africa: Racism in Conrad's Heart of Darkness". Decrying Joseph Conrad as "a bloody racist", Achebe asserted that Conrad's novel Heart of Darkness dehumanises Africans, rendering Africa as "a metaphysical battlefield devoid of all recognisable humanity, into which the wandering European enters at his peril." Achebe also discussed a quotation from Albert Schweitzer, a 1952 Nobel Peace Prize laureate: "That extraordinary missionary, Albert Schweitzer, who sacrificed brilliant careers in music and theology in Europe for a life of service to Africans in much the same area as Conrad writes about, epitomizes the ambivalence. In a comment which has often been quoted Schweitzer says: 'The African is indeed my brother but my junior brother.' And so he proceeded to build a hospital appropriate to the needs of junior brothers with standards of hygiene reminiscent of medical practice in the days before the germ theory of disease came into being."

The lecture was immediately controversial. Many English professors in attendance were upset by his remarks; one elderly professor reportedly approached him, said, "How dare you!", and stormed away. Another suggested that Achebe had "no sense of humour", but several days later Achebe was approached by a third professor, who told him: "I now realize that I had never really read Heart of Darkness although I have taught it for years."

Achebe's criticism has become a mainstream perspective on Conrad's work. The essay was included in the 1988 Norton critical edition of Conrad's novel. Editor Robert Kimbrough called it one of "the three most important events in Heart of Darkness criticism since the second edition of his book." Critic Nicolas Tredell divides Conrad's criticism "into two epochal phases: before and after Achebe." Asked frequently about his essay, Achebe once explained that he never meant for the work to be abandoned: "It's not in my nature to talk about banning books. I am saying, read it—with the kind of understanding and with the knowledge I talk about. And read it beside African works." Interviewed on National Public Radio with Robert Siegel in October 2009, Achebe stated that he was still critical of Heart of Darkness. He tempered this criticism in a discussion entitled "'Heart of Darkness' is inappropriate", stating: "Conrad was a seductive writer. He could pull his reader into the fray. And if it were not for what he said about me and my people, I would probably be thinking only of that seduction."

=== Retirement and politics (1976–1986) ===
After his service at UMass Amherst and a visiting professorship at the University of Connecticut, Achebe returned to the University of Nigeria in 1976, where he held a chair in English until his retirement in 1981. When he returned to the University of Nigeria, he hoped to accomplish three goals: finish the novel he had been writing, renew the native publication of Okike, and further his study of Igbo culture. In an August 1976 interview, he lashed out at the archetypal Nigerian intellectual, stating that the archetype was divorced from the intellect "but for two things: status and stomach. And if there's any danger that he might suffer official displeasure or lose his job, he would prefer to turn a blind eye to what is happening around him." In October 1979, Achebe was awarded the first-ever Nigerian National Merit Award.

After his 1981 retirement, he devoted more time to editing Okike and became active with the left-leaning People's Redemption Party (PRP). In 1983, he became the party's deputy national vice-president. He published a book called The Trouble with Nigeria to coincide with the upcoming elections. On the first page, Achebe says: "the Nigerian problem is the unwillingness or inability of its leaders to rise to the responsibility and to the challenge of personal example which are the hallmarks of true leadership." The elections that followed were marked by violence and charges of fraud. Asked whether he thought Nigerian politics had changed since A Man of the People, Achebe replied: "I think, if anything, the Nigerian politician has deteriorated." After the elections, he engaged in a heated argument—which almost became a fistfight—with Sabo Bakin Zuwo, the newly elected governor of Kano State. He left the PRP and kept his distance from political parties, expressing sadness with his perception of the dishonesty and weakness of the people involved.

He spent most of the 1980s delivering speeches, attending conferences, and working on his sixth novel. In 1986 he was elected president-general of the Ogidi Town Union; he reluctantly accepted and began a three-year term. In the same year, he stepped down as editor of Okike.

=== Anthills and paralysis (1987–1999) ===
In 1987 Achebe released his fifth novel, Anthills of the Savannah, about a military coup in the fictional West African nation of Kangan. A finalist for the Booker Prize, the novel was hailed in the Financial Times: "in a powerful fusion of myth, legend and modern styles, Achebe has written a book which is wise, exciting and essential, a powerful antidote to the cynical commentators from 'overseas' who see nothing ever new out of Africa." An opinion piece in the magazine West Africa said the book deserved to win the Booker Prize, and that Achebe was "a writer who has long deserved the recognition that has already been accorded him by his sales figures." The prize went instead to Penelope Lively's novel Moon Tiger.

On 22 March 1990, Achebe was riding in a car to Lagos when an axle collapsed and the car flipped. His son Ikechukwu and the driver suffered minor injuries, but the weight of the vehicle fell on Achebe and his spine was severely damaged. He was flown to the Paddocks Hospital in Buckinghamshire, England, and treated for his injuries. In July doctors announced that although he was recuperating well, he was paralyzed from the waist down and would require the use of a wheelchair for the rest of his life. Soon afterwards, Achebe became the Charles P. Stevenson Professor of Languages and Literature at Bard College in Annandale-on-Hudson, New York; he held the position for more than fifteen years. Throughout the 1990s, Achebe spent little time in Nigeria but remained actively involved in the country's politics, denouncing the usurpation of power by General Sani Abacha.

=== Later years and death (2000–2013) ===
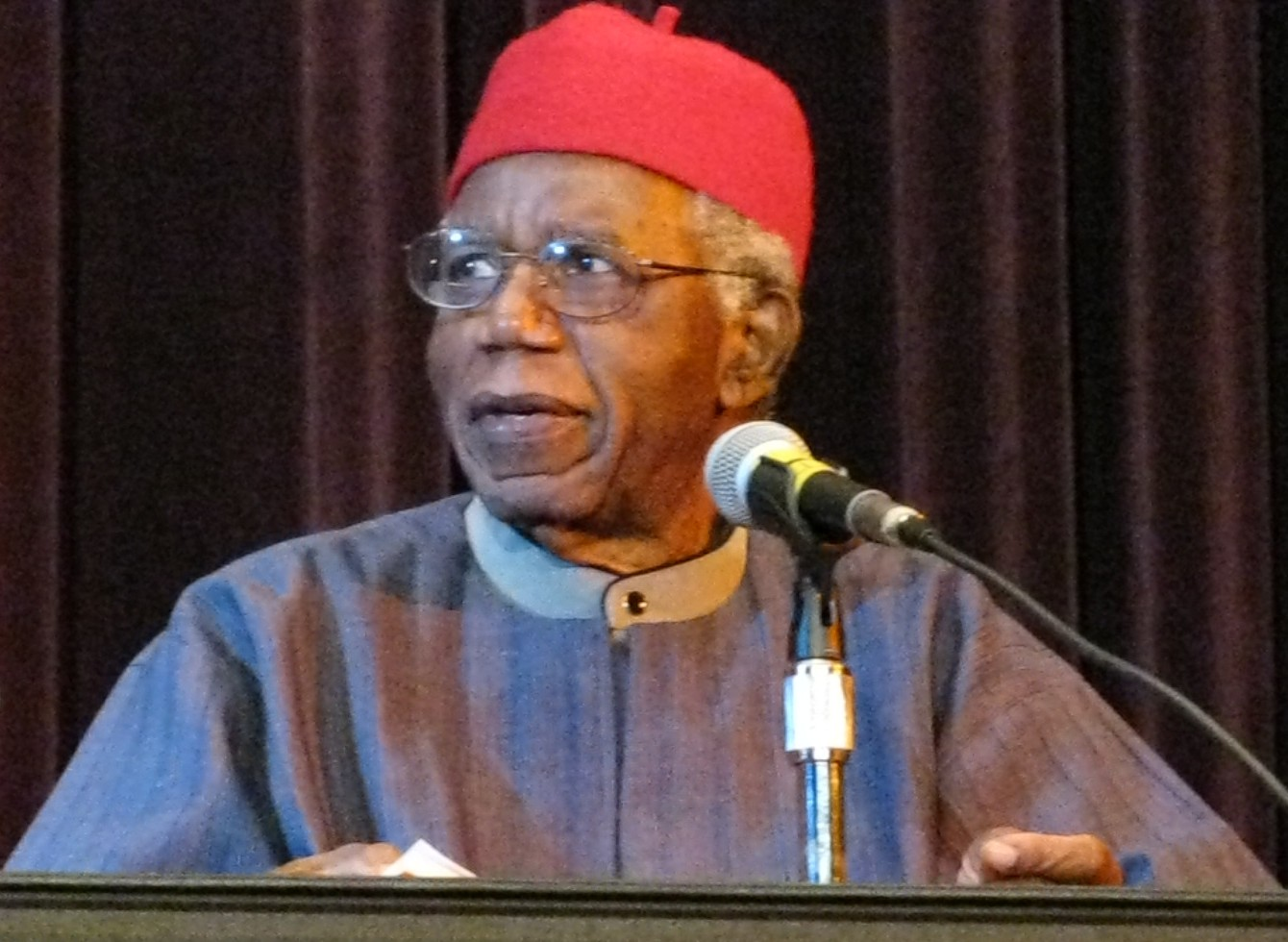
Achebe speaking at Asbury Hall, Buffalo, in 2008

In 2000 Achebe published Home and Exile, a semi-biographical collection of both his thoughts on life away from Nigeria, as well as discussion of the emerging school of Native American literature. (Note: His comments on the emerging school of Native American literature was largely based on lectures he had given at Harvard University in 1998.) In October 2005, the London Financial Times reported that Achebe was planning to write a novella for the Canongate Myth Series, a series of short novels in which ancient myths from myriad cultures are reimagined and rewritten by contemporary authors.

Achebe was awarded the Man Booker International Prize in June 2007. The judging panel included American critic Elaine Showalter, who said he "illuminated the path for writers around the world seeking new words and forms for new realities and societies"; and South African writer Nadine Gordimer, who said Achebe's "early work made him the father of modern African literature as an integral part of world literature." The award helped correct what "many perceived as a great injustice to African literature, that the founding father of African literature had not won some of the key international prizes." For the International Festival of Igbo culture, Achebe briefly returned to Nigeria to give the Ahajioku Lecture. Later that year he published The Education of A British-Protected Child, a collection of essays. In autumn he joined the Brown University faculty as the David and Marianna Fisher University Professor of Africana Studies. In 2010, Achebe was awarded The Dorothy and Lillian Gish Prize for $300,000, one of the richest prizes for the arts.

In 2012, Achebe published There Was a Country: A Personal History of Biafra. The work re-opened the discussion about the Nigerian Civil War. It would be his last publication during his lifetime; Achebe died after a short illness on 21 March 2013 in Boston, United States. An unidentified source close to the family said that he was ill and was hospitalised in the city. The New York Times described him in his obituary as "one of Africa's most widely read novelists and one of the continent's towering men of letters." The BBC wrote that he was "revered throughout the world for his depiction of life in Africa". He was buried in his hometown of Ogidi.

== Style ==
=== Oral tradition ===
The style of Achebe's fiction draws heavily on the oral tradition of the Igbo people. He incorporates folk tales into his stories, exposing community values in both the content and the form of storytelling. For example, the tale about the Earth and Sky in Things Fall Apart emphasises the interdependency of the masculine and the feminine. Although Nwoye enjoys hearing his mother tell the tale, Okonkwo's dislike for it is evidence of his imbalance.

Achebe used proverbs to describe the values of the rural Igbo tradition. He includes them throughout the narratives, repeating points made in conversation. Critic Anjali Gera notes that the use of proverbs in Arrow of God "serves to create through an echo effect the judgement of a community upon an individual violation." The use of such repetition in Achebe's urban novels, No Longer at Ease and A Man of the People, is less pronounced.

Achebe's short stories are not as widely studied as his novels, and Achebe himself did not consider them a major part of his work. In the preface for Girls at War and Other Stories, he writes: "A dozen pieces in twenty years must be accounted a pretty lean harvest by any reckoning." Like his novels, the short stories are heavily influenced by the oral tradition. They often have morals emphasising the importance of cultural traditions, as influenced by folk tales.

=== Use of English ===
During decolonisation in the 1950s, a debate about choice of language erupted and pursued authors around the world. Achebe's work is scrutinised for its subject matter, insistence on a non-colonial narrative, and use of English. In his essay "English and the African Writer", Achebe discusses how the process of colonialism—for all its ills—provided colonised people from varying linguistic backgrounds "a language with which to talk to one another". As his purpose is to communicate with readers across Nigeria, he uses "the one central language enjoying nationwide currency". Using English also allowed his books to be read in the colonial ruling nations.

Achebe recognises the shortcomings of what Audre Lorde called "the master's tools". In another essay, he notes:

For an African writing in English is not without its serious setbacks. He often finds himself describing situations or modes of thought which have no direct equivalent in the English way of life. Caught in that situation he can do one of two things. He can try and contain what he wants to say within the limits of conventional English or he can try to push back those limits to accommodate his ideas [...] I submit that those who can do the work of extending the frontiers of English so as to accommodate African thought patterns must do it through their mastery of English and not out of innocence.

In another essay, he refers to James Baldwin's struggle to use the English language to accurately represent his experience and his realisation that he needed to take control of the language and expand it. Achebe's novels were a foundation for this process; by altering syntax, usage, and idiom, he transformed the language into a distinctly African style. In some spots this takes the form of repetition of an Igbo idea in standard English parlance; elsewhere it appears as narrative asides integrated into descriptive sentences.

== Themes ==
In his early writing, a depiction of the Igbo culture itself is paramount. Critic Nahem Yousaf highlights the importance of these depictions: "Around the tragic stories of Okonkwo and Ezeulu, Achebe sets about textualising Igbo cultural identity". The portrayal of indigenous life is not simply a matter of literary background, he adds: "Achebe seeks to produce the effect of a precolonial reality as an Igbo-centric response to a Eurocentrically constructed imperial 'reality' ". Certain elements of Achebe's depiction of Igbo life in Things Fall Apart match those in Olaudah Equiano's autobiographical Narrative. Responding to charges that Equiano was not actually born in Africa, Achebe wrote in 1975: "Equiano was an Igbo, I believe, from the village of Iseke in the Orlu division of Nigeria".

=== Tradition and colonialism ===
At a time when African writers were being admonished for being obsessed with the past, Achebe argued that confronted by colonial denigration, evacuated from the category of the human, and denied the capacity for thinking and creativity, the African needed a narrative of redemption. A redemptive hermeneutics was pegged on a deep historical sense.

— Simon Gikandi

A prevalent theme in Achebe's novels is the intersection of African tradition (particularly Igbo varieties) and modernity, especially as embodied by European colonialism. For example, the village of Umuofia in Things Fall Apart is violently shaken with internal divisions when the white Christian missionaries arrive. Nigerian English professor Ernest N. Emenyonu describes the colonial experience in the novel as "the systematic emasculation of the entire culture". Achebe later embodied this tension between African tradition and Western influence in the figure of Sam Okoli, the president of Kangan in Anthills of the Savannah. Distanced from the myths and tales of the community by his Westernised education, he does not have the capacity for reconnection shown by the character Beatrice.

The colonial impact on the Igbo in Achebe's novels is often affected by individuals from Europe, but institutions and urban offices frequently serve a similar purpose. The character of Obi in No Longer at Ease succumbs to colonial-era corruption in the city; the temptations of his position overwhelm his identity and fortitude. Having shown his acumen for portraying traditional Igbo culture in Things Fall Apart, Achebe demonstrated in No Longer at Ease an ability to depict modern Nigerian life.

The standard Achebean ending results in the destruction of an individual, which leads to the downfall of the community. Odili's descent into the luxury of corruption and hedonism in A Man of the People, for example, is symbolic of the post-colonial crisis in Nigeria and elsewhere. Even with the emphasis on colonialism, Achebe's tragic endings embody the traditional confluence of fate, individual and society, as represented by Sophocles and Shakespeare.

Achebe seeks to portray neither moral absolutes nor a fatalistic inevitability. In 1972, he said: "I never will take the stand that the Old must win or that the New must win. The point is that no single truth satisfied me—and this is well founded in the Igbo worldview. No single man can be correct all the time, no single idea can be totally correct." His perspective is reflected in the words of Ikem, a character in Anthills of the Savannah: "whatever you are is never enough; you must find a way to accept something, however small, from the other to make you whole and to save you from the mortal sin of righteousness and extremism." In a 1996 interview, Achebe said: "Belief in either radicalism or orthodoxy is too simplified a way of viewing things ... Evil is never all evil; goodness on the other hand is often tainted with selfishness."

=== Masculinity and femininity ===
The gender roles of men and women, as well as society's conceptions of the associated concepts, are frequent themes in Achebe's writing. He has been criticised as a sexist author, in response to what many call the uncritical depiction of traditionally patriarchal Igbo society, where the most masculine men take numerous wives, and women are beaten regularly. Paradoxically, Igbo society immensely values individual achievement but also sees the ownership over or acquisition of women as a signifier of success. The African studies scholar Rose Ure Mezu suggests that Achebe is representing the limited gendered vision of the characters, or that he purposefully created exaggerated gender binaries to render Igbo history recognizable to international readers. Conversely, the scholar Ajoke Mimiko Bestman has stated that reading Achebe through the lens of womanism is "an afrocentric concept forged out of global feminism to analyze the condition of Black African women" which acknowledges the patriarchal oppression of women and highlights the resistance and dignity of African women, which enables an understanding of Igbo conceptions of gender complementarity.

According to Bestman, in Things Fall Apart Okonkwo's furious manhood overpowers everything "feminine" in his life, including his own conscience, while Achebe's depiction of the chi, or personal god, has been called the "mother within". Okonkwo's father was considered an agbala—a word that refers to a man without title, but is also synonymous with 'woman'. Okonkwo's feminization of his father's laziness and cowardice is typical of the Igbo perspective on any man seen as unsuccessful. His obsession with maleness is fueled by an intense fear of femaleness, which he expresses through the physical and verbal abuse of his wives, his violence towards his community, his constant worry that his son Nwoye is not manly enough, and his wish that his daughter Ezinma had been born a boy. The women in the novel are obedient, quiet, and absent from positions of authority—despite the fact that Igbo women were traditionally involved in village leadership. The desire for feminine balance is highlighted by Ani, the earth goddess, and the extended discussion of "Nneka" ("Mother is supreme") in chapter fourteen. The perseverance and love from Okonkwo's second wife Ekwefi towards Ezinma, despite her many miscarriages, is seen as a tribute to Igbo womanhood, which is typically defined by motherhood. Okonkwo's defeat is seen by Mezu and literature scholar Nahem Yousaf as a vindication of the need for a balancing feminine ethos. Bestman argued that Okonkwo's failures are tied to his contempt for and fear of women and his inability to form quality personal relationships with the women in his life. Achebe expressed frustration at frequently being misunderstood on this point, saying that "I want to sort of scream that Things Fall Apart is on the side of women [...] And that Okonkwo is paying the penalty for his treatment of women; that all his problems, all the things he did wrong, can be seen as offenses against the feminine." On this, Bestman states that Okonkwo's violent and vehement anti-women position is the exception, not the norm, within his community of Umuofia and the wider Igbo society.

== Influence and legacy ==
=== Overview ===
It is a tag of either literary ignorance or 'momentary exuberance' [...] Those who seriously believe or promote this must be asked: have you the sheerest acquaintance with the literature of other African nations, in both indigenous and adopted colonial languages? [...] Education is lacking in most of those who pontificate.

— Chinua Achebe on being called the "father of African literature"

Achebe is regarded as the most dominant and influential writer of modern African literature, and has been called the "father of African literature", the "founding father of African literature", and the "'father of the African novel in English". (Note: Literature scholar Leonard A. Podis noted that Achebe's "stature as the patriarch of modern African literature" was reinforced upon his death, as many obituaries described him in such a way.) Achebe rejected such descriptions as patronising and eurocentric, which were qualities his work sought to critique in the first place. He countered white descriptions of himself as such by claiming that "education is lacking in most of those who pontificate". Things Fall Apart has been described as the most important book in modern African literature and was described as his masterpiece by critic Dwight Garner. Selling over 20 million copies worldwide, it has been translated into 57 languages, making Achebe the most translated, studied, and read African author. His legacy as a writer is particularly unique in regard to its substantial impact on not only African literature but Western literature as well.

At the ceremony for his honorary degree from the University of Kent, professor Robert Gibson said that the Nigerian writer "is now revered as Master by the younger generation of African writers and it is to him they regularly turn for counsel and inspiration." In November 2015 the theme of the Pan African Writers' Association's 22nd International African Writers' Day and three-day conference was "Celebrating the Life and Works of Chinua Achebe: The Coming of Age of African Literature?" The scholar Simon Gikandi, recalling the schooling of himself and his classmates in Kenya, said Things Fall Apart "changed the lives of many of us". The South African president and anti-apartheid activist Nelson Mandela, who was incarcerated for 27 years, remarked that "There was a writer named Chinua Achebe [...] in whose company the prison walls fell down".

Outside of Africa, Achebe's impact resonates strongly in literary circles. Novelist Margaret Atwood called him "a magical writer—one of the greatest of the twentieth century". Poet Maya Angelou lauded Things Fall Apart as a book wherein "all readers meet their brothers, sisters, parents and friends and themselves along Nigerian roads". Nobel laureate Toni Morrison noted that Achebe's work inspired her to become a writer and "sparked her love affair with African literature".

=== Awards and honours ===
Achebe received over 30 honorary degrees from universities in Nigeria, Canada, South Africa, the United Kingdom and the United States, including Dartmouth College, Harvard, and Brown. Among his other honours are the first Commonwealth Poetry Prize (1972); the Nigerian National Order of Merit, the Order of the Federal Republic (1979); an Honorary Fellowship of the American Academy of Arts and Letters (1982); the St. Louis Literary Award (1999); the Peace Prize of the German Book Trade (2002); the Man Booker International Prize (2007); and the Dorothy and Lillian Gish Prize (2010). In 1992 he became the first living writer to be represented in the Everyman's Library collection (reprints of classic literature) published by Alfred A. Knopf. He was appointed a Goodwill Ambassador by the United Nations Population Fund in 1999.

Although he accepted numerous honours from the Nigerian government, Achebe refused its Commander of the Federal Republic award in 2004. Citing his frustration with the political environment, he explained:

Forty-three years ago, at the first anniversary of Nigeria's independence I was given the first Nigerian National Trophy for Literature. In 1979, I received two further honours—the Nigerian National Order of Merit and the Order of the Federal Republic—and in 1999 the first National Creativity Award. I accepted all these honours fully aware that Nigeria was not perfect; but I had a strong belief that we would outgrow our shortcomings under leaders committed to uniting our diverse peoples. Nigeria's condition today under your [Olusegun Obasanjo's] watch is, however, too dangerous for silence. I must register my disappointment and protest by declining to accept the high honour awarded me in the 2004 Honours List.

In 2011, Achebe was again offered the Commander of the Federal Republic, but he declined it asserting "the reasons for rejecting the offer when it was first made have not been addressed let alone solved. It is inappropriate to offer it again to me". Then-President Goodluck Jonathan claimed that Achebe's refusal was regrettable and may have been influenced by misinformation, but said he still held him in high regard.

Despite his international renown, Achebe never received the Nobel Prize for Literature, which some—particularly Nigerians—viewed as unjust. In 1988 Achebe was asked by a reporter for Quality Weekly how he felt about never winning a Nobel Prize; he replied: "My position is that the Nobel Prize is important. But it is a European prize. It's not an African prize ... Literature is not a heavyweight championship. Nigerians may think, you know, this man has been knocked out. It's nothing to do with that." Despite his own indifference, Nobel laureate in literature, Wole Soyinka reports that immediately after Achebe's death he received a great many letters urging him to nominate Achebe posthumously. Soyinka denied such requests, explaining that Achebe "is entitled to better than being escorted to his grave with that monotonous, hypocritical aria of deprivation's lament, orchestrated by those who, as we say in my part of the world, 'dye their mourning weeds a deeper indigo than those of the bereaved'. He deserves his peace. Me too! And right now, not posthumously."

=== Memorials and recognition ===
Bard College founded the Chinua Achebe Center in 2005, to "create dynamic projects for the most talented of a new generation of writers and artists of African origin." Bard also established a Chinua Achebe Fellowship in Global African Studies. Achebe was created the "Ugonabo" of Ogidi, a Nigerian chieftain, by the people of his ancestral hometown in 2013. In Igbo culture, taking a title such as this is the highest honour a man may receive. On Achebe's 86th birthday in 2016, young writers in Anambra State began the Chinua Achebe Literary Festival. In 2019, 2,000 film stills by Stephen Goldblatt, production documents, correspondence and more from the film production Things Fall Apart were found in Berlin. The film was produced in Nigeria in 1970 and considered lost for decades. After an extensive research and digitisation project, exhibitions and film screenings were held in Lagos, Kampala, Abidjan, Accra, Atlanta and other cities. Achebe himself had attended the film's premiere in Atlanta in 1974. In December 2019, a memorial bust commemorating Achebe and the opening of the Chinua Achebe Literary Court was unveiled at the University of Nigeria, Nsukka. Achebe was honoured as Grand Prix de la Mémoire (Grand Prize for Memory) of the 2019 edition of the Grand Prix of Literary Associations prize.

== Selected writings ==
- Things Fall Apart (1959)
- No Longer at Ease (1961)
- Arrow of God (1964)
- A Man of the People (1966)
- Anthills of the Savannah (1987)
