= Double-barrelled name =

Family name that combines two family names

A double-barrelled name or double-barrelled surname, also called a double surname or a hyphenated surname, is a type of compound surname, typically featuring two words (occasionally more), often joined by a hyphen. Notable people with double-barrelled names include Winnie Madikizela-Mandela, Julia Louis-Dreyfus, and Beyoncé Knowles-Carter.

In the British tradition, a double surname is heritable, usually taken to preserve a family name that would have become extinct due to the absence of male descendants bearing the name, connected to the inheritance of a family estate. Examples include Harding-Rolls, Stopford-Sackville, and Spencer-Churchill.

In the Spanish tradition, double surnames are the norm and not an indication of social status. People used to take the (first) surname of their fathers, followed by the (first) surname of their mothers (i.e., their maternal grandfather's surname). In Spain (since 2000) and Chile (since 2022), parents can choose the order of the last names of their children, with the provision that all children from the same couple need to have them in the same order; the double surname itself is not heritable. These names are combined without hyphen (but optionally using y, which means "and" in Spanish). In addition to this, there are heritable double surnames (apellidos compuestos), which are mostly but not always combined with a hyphen. Hyphenated last names usually correspond to both last names of one of the parents, but both last names can be hyphenated, so some Hispanics may legally have two double-barrelled last names corresponding to both last names of both parents. Many Spanish scholars use a pen name, where they enter a hyphen between their last names to avoid being misrepresented in citations.

In the German tradition, double surnames can be taken upon marriage, written with or without hyphen, combining the husband's surname with the wife's (more recently, the sequence has become optional under some legislations). These double surnames are "alliance names" (Allianznamen).

== Etymology ==
The term "double-barrelled surname" was in origin used for British double names indicative of (partially) aristocratic background. Earlier usage prefers "double-barrelled name" in reference to the British double surnames; the more specific "double-barrelled surname" is a recharacterization after the tendency to use "double-barrelled name" for the fashion of hyphenated given names. The term "double-barrelled (sur)name" appears to have been coined in the Victorian era, originally with a sarcastic undertone implying pomposity. (Note: For example: "It is looked on as a public blessing, a boon to the general good-humor, when a statesman is endowed with a double-barreled name. It brings on a perpetual feu de joie of squibs, and makes him so much the more agreeable to everybody but himself."; "The hero, who was a prince, had a sort of double-barreled name, which would defy all sorts at pronunciation; and so had the heroine. They were names which, no doubt, would be instrumental in selling any fever and ague mixture should they be affixed to it."; "an extravagant superfluity of new-coined phraseology and technical terms, which every distinguished person's illness elicits from some fashionable physician with a double-barreled surname and none denoting Christianity.")

However, it is now also used more generally of any double surname (an example being when using "double-barrelled" to refer to a Danish double surname.) The word "barrel" possibly refers to the barrel of a gun, as in "double-barreled shotgun" or "double-barreled rifle".

== By country ==
=== British tradition ===
==== Double-barrelled surnames ====
Many British noble or gentry families have double-barrelled surnames, many of which are written without a hyphen. This may lead to confusion as to whether it is a surname or a given name combined with a single-word surname.

In Wales, many families have double-barrelled surnames. The preponderance of a few surnames (such as Jones, Williams, and Davies) led to the usage of double-barrelled names in Wales to avoid confusion of unrelated but similarly named people.

==== Triple-barrelled surnames ====
A few British noble or gentry families have triple-barrelled surnames. These indicate prima facie the inheritance of multiple estates and thus the consolidation of great wealth. They are sometimes created when the legator has a double-barrelled name and the legatee has a single surname, or vice versa. Nowadays, such names are almost always abbreviated in everyday usage to a single or double-barrelled version. For example, actress Isabella Anstruther-Gough-Calthorpe calls herself Isabella Calthorpe. There is at least one instance of an unhyphenated triple-barrelled surname: that of the Montagu Douglas Scott family, to which the Dukes of Buccleuch belong.

==== Examples ====
===== Unhyphenated double-barrel surnames =====
- Politicians Catherine Fleming Bruce, David Lloyd George (who used the hyphen when appointed to the peerage), and Iain Duncan Smith
- Composers Ralph Vaughan Williams and Andrew Lloyd Webber
- Writers Charles and Mary Cowden Clarke
- Military historian B. H. Liddell Hart
- Soldier and translator C. K. Scott Moncrieff
- Evolutionary biologist John Maynard Smith
- Astronomers Jocelyn Bell Burnell and Robert Hanbury Brown
- Actresses Kristin Scott Thomas and Helena Bonham Carter (the latter of whom has said the hyphen is optional, and indeed several of her relatives use it in their names)
- Footballer Emile Smith Rowe
- Musician Romy Madley Croft
- Comedian Sacha Baron Cohen (whose cousins, psychologist Simon Baron-Cohen and filmmaker Ash Baron-Cohen, use the hyphen in their names).
- The surname of the Holmes à Court family is double-barrelled; the birth surname of the 2nd Baron Heytesbury was 'à Court', and he took the surname 'Holmes à Court' after marrying Elizabeth Holmes.

===== Hyphenated double-barrel surnames =====
- Bowes-Lyon, a Scottish noble family
- Cavendish-Bentinck, a name associated with the Dukes of Portland and their descendants
- Chetwynd-Talbot, a name associated with the Earls of Shrewsbury and their descendants
- Crichton-Stuart, a name associated with the Marquesses of Bute and their descendants
- Douglas-Hamilton, the family surname of the Dukes of Hamilton and Earls of Selkirk
- Douglas-Home
- FitzAlan-Howard
- Gascoyne-Cecil, a name associated with the Marquesses of Salisbury and their descendants
- Gathorne-Hardy
- Gordon-Lennox, a name associated with the Dukes of Richmond and their descendants
- Hely-Hutchinson
- Innes-Ker, a name associated with the Dukes of Roxburghe and their descendants
- Monckton-Arundell
- Mountbatten-Windsor, the family surname available to and used by descendants of Queen Elizabeth II and Prince Philip, Duke of Edinburgh, when one is required.
- Petty-Fitzmaurice
- Pleydell-Bouverie
- Sackville-West
  - In literature : Otho, Lotho and Lobelia Sackville-Baggins, in J. R. R. Tolkien's stories The Hobbit and The Lord of the Rings. Lobelia (née Bracegirdle) may be an unfavourable caricature of Vita Sackville-West, of the above real-life family.
- Scudamore-Stanhope
- Spencer-Churchill, a name associated with the Dukes of Marlborough and their descendants
- Windsor-Clive

===== Triple-barrelled surnames =====
- Anstruther-Gough-Calthorpe, a name associated with the baronets of Hampshire and their descendants
- Baillie-Hamilton-Arden, the name used by George Baillie-Hamilton-Arden, 11th Earl of Haddington
- Cave-Browne-Cave, a name associated with the Barons of Stanford and their descendants
- Douglas-Scott-Montagu, a name associated with the Barons of Hampshire and their descendants
- Elliot-Murray-Kynynmound, a name associated with the Earls of Minto and their descendants
- Heathcote-Drummond-Willoughby, the surname used by the Barons Willoughby de Eresby
- Lyon-Dalberg-Acton
- Pelham-Clinton-Hope
- Sutherland-Leveson-Gower, a name associated with the Dukes of Sutherland and their descendants
- Vane-Tempest-Stewart, a name associated with the Marquesses of Londonberry and their descendants
- Venables-Vernon-Harcourt
- Twisleton-Wykeham-Fiennes, the name used by the descendants of the 16th Baron Saye and Sele

===== Quadruple-barrelled surnames =====
- Cameron-Ramsay-Fairfax-Lucy
- Hepburn-Stuart-Forbes-Trefusis, a name associated with the Barons of Clinton and their descendants
- Hovell-Thurlow-Cumming-Bruce, a name associated with the Barons of Thurlow and their descendants
- Lane Fox Pitt-Rivers, the full name of Augustus Pitt Rivers
- Montagu-Stuart-Wortley-Mackenzie, a name associated with the Earls of Wharncliffe and their descendants
- Plunkett-Ernle-Erle-Drax, the surname of the descendants of Admiral The Honourable Sir Reginald Aylmer Ranfurly Plunkett-Ernle-Erle-Drax
- Stirling-Home-Drummond-Moray

===== Quintuple-barrelled surnames =====
The surname of the extinct family of the Dukes of Buckingham and Chandos was the quintuple-barrelled Temple-Nugent-Brydges-Chandos-Grenville.

=== Traditions in the Iberian Peninsula ===
In Spain, surnames are strictly regulated by the Civil Code and the Law of the Civil Registry. When a person is born, the law requires them to take the first surname of the father and then the first surname of the mother. Thus, when D. Julio Iglesias de la Cueva and Dª Isabel Preysler Arrastía had a son named Enrique, he legally was Enrique Iglesias Preysler. On the other hand, actual double-barrelled names exist (called apellidos compuestos), such as Calvo-Sotelo or López-Portillo. For example, Leopoldo Calvo-Sotelo y Bustelo is the son of Leopoldo Calvo Sotelo and Mercedes Bustelo Vázquez. Such names may reflect the attempt to preserve a family name that would be lost without this practice. The creation of such names must be approved by request to the Ministry of the Interior. Sometimes a conjunction meaning "and" is inserted between the paternal and maternal surnames, as in the Castilian name Leonor de Borbón y Ortiz and the Catalan Francesc Ferrer i Guàrdia.

Spain's hidalgo families often used double-barrelled names in conjunction with the nobiliary particle de (of). Toponymic family such as the surnames García de las Heras, Pérez de Arce, or López de Haro combine a regular family name with the branch of the family. For example, the "López" branch hailing from the Rioja town of Haro, La Rioja. Surnames associated with Spanish nobility follow the same custom, such as Álvarez de Toledo, Ramírez de Arellano, or Fernández de Córdoba. In these cases, the first surname indicates the original name of the family, whereas the second surname denotes the nobiliary fief of that family. In this context, the conjunction "de" (of) reflects that the family used to be the feudal lords of that place. Thus, the Ramírez were the lords of the village of Arellano, in Navarra.

In Portugal, where most of the population have two to four surnames (apelidos de família), the practice of using a double combination of surnames is very common. The person can either use a paternal and a maternal surname combined (Aníbal Cavaco Silva) or use a double last name that has been passed down through one of the parents (António Lobo Antunes). The last surname (normally the paternal one) is usually considered the "most important", but people may choose to use another one, often favouring the more resonant or less common of their surnames in their daily or professional life (such as Manuel Alegre or José Manuel Barroso, who is known in Portugal by his double surname Durão Barroso). The use of more than two surnames in public life is less common, but not unusual (see Sophia de Mello Breyner Andresen). Combined surnames of two gentry families from Portugal are also prevalent, such as Nogueira Ferrão.

One historic early aviator, Alberto Santos-Dumont, is known to have not only often used an equal sign (=) between his two surnames in place of a hyphen but also seems to have preferred that practice, to display equal respect for his father's French ethnicity and the Brazilian nationality of his mother.

=== Germanic tradition ===
In Germany, a double surname (German: Doppelname) is generally joined with a single hyphen. Other types of double surnames are not accepted by German name law. However, exceptions are made for immigrants and for marriages where the double surname was already the official name of one partner before marriage. A 1993 law forbids surnames with more than two components. Prior to this, it was permitted for adults (e.g., Simone Greiner-Petter-Memm and formerly Elisabeth Noelle-Neumann-Maier-Leibniz), but their children would not inherit the name. The 1993 ban was upheld by the Constitutional Court in 2009. The crew members of the World War I light cruiser SMS Emden were allowed to add the name Emden with a hyphen to their surname as a special honour after the war. There is the possibility that one partner can combine both names with a hyphen; thus, one of them then bears a Doppelname. Only one partner can take this option, making it impossible for both to have Doppelnamen. In a marriage between Herr Schmidt and Frau Meyer, the couple could not be known as Herr Meyer-Schmidt and Frau Meyer-Schmidt. If they have children, the family has to decide on one surname for all the children, either Meyer or Schmidt, but not Meyer-Schmidt. Until the late 20th century, it was only possible for a woman to add her maiden name to that of her husband, not the other way around. Therefore, Frau Meyer would become Mrs. Schmidt-Meyer. This tradition has continued, for the most part.

In Switzerland, double surnames are traditionally written with a hyphen and combine the surnames of a married couple, with the husband's surname in first place and the wife's second. This double name is called "alliance name" (German: Allianzname). The first name as such, however, is the official family name, which will be inherited by their legitimate children. So, for example, if Werner Stauffacher is married to Gertrud Baumgarten, both can use the name Stauffacher-Baumgarten. Their children, however, bear only the surname Stauffacher. Prominent bearers of an alliance name are Micheline Calmy-Rey (former Federal Minister for Foreign Affairs), Eveline Widmer-Schlumpf (former Federal Minister for Finance), and Johann Schneider-Ammann (former Federal Minister for the Economy). While it is traditional for the family name to be that of the husband, either name may be chosen, with the person who changes their surname being allowed to add a hyphen to their original name. Alternatively, both partners may keep their own name and choose which of the surnames is passed on to children upon the birth of their first child.

Doubling of surnames is also practised by the Dutch. An example is the name of footballer Jan Vennegoor of Hesselink. According to The Guardian, his name derives from "the 17th century, when two farming families in the Enschede area of the Netherlands intermarried. Both the Vennegoor and Hesselink names carried equal social weight, and so – rather than choose between them – they chose to use both. Of in Dutch translates to "or", which means that a strict translation of his name reads Jan Vennegoor or Hesselink." Some of these Dutch surnames also survive in South Africa, for example, the rugby player Rohan Janse van Rensburg's surname is Janse van Rensburg, not just van Rensburg (which is itself an existing surname). In addition, it was common for a wife to be known by her husband's surname (first) and her original/birth name (second) hyphenated. Nowadays, couples can choose any combination of surnames for official use (although their legal name will remain unchanged). It remains most prevalent for the wife either to use a hyphenated surname or her original/birth name. Few husbands use a hyphenated surname. All children of a couple need to go by the same surname (either their father's or their mother's) and will not normally have a hyphenated surname.

=== Scandinavia ===
Denmark has a tradition of double surnames originating in the 19th century. This was a result of two naming acts obliging commoners to adopt heritable surnames, passed first for the Duchy of Schleswig in 1771 and then for Denmark proper in 1828. Most people chose their patronymic as their heritable surname, resulting in an overwhelming dominance of a few surnames.

To reduce the risk of mistaken identity, many Danes started using their mothers' original/birth names as a heritable middle name (similar to the Russian or Hispanic system), rather than as a second given name (as in the English system). One example is three successive prime ministers of Denmark all sharing the same last name, Rasmussen, so they are usually referred to by their middle name: Nyrup, Fogh, and Løkke.

Currently, the Danish order of names invariably places the patronymic -sen at the end, regardless of whether that name has been passed down by the father or mother, or adopted through marriage. Unlike the Russian or Hispanic systems, this surname-style middle name is not considered a proper last name in official documents, unless hyphenated into one compound name.

=== Poland ===
In Poland, a double surname (Polish: nazwisko złożone, "complex surname") is generally joined with a hyphen. Polish surnames (Polish: nazwisko, singular), like those in most of Europe, are hereditary and generally patrilineal, i.e., passed from the father to his children. A married woman usually adopts her husband's name. However, other combinations are legally possible. The wife may keep her original/birth name (Polish: nazwisko panieńskie, literally: "maiden surname") or add her husband's surname to hers, thus creating a double name (nazwisko złożone). A married man can also adopt his wife's surname, or add it to his. Polish triple-barreled surnames are known to exist: an example is the one borne by Ludwik Kos-Rabcewicz-Zubkowski, a university professor and writer living in Canada.

=== Russia ===
In Russia, double-barreled surnames are somewhat uncommon, but normal and accepted practice, often associated with some families of note wishing to preserve both of their lineages. Federal law #143-FZ "On Civil State Acts" explicitly allows double-barreled names in its Article 18 but limits such compound surnames to two parts only.

Статья 18. Запись фамилии, имени и отчества ребенка при государственной регистрации рождения

1. При государственной регистрации рождения фамилия ребенка записывается по фамилии его родителей. При разных фамилиях родителей по соглашению родителей ребенку присваивается фамилия отца, фамилия матери или двойная фамилия, образованная посредством присоединения фамилий отца и матери друг к другу в любой последовательности, если иное не предусмотрено законами субъектов Российской Федерации. Не допускается изменение последовательности присоединения фамилий отца и матери друг к другу при образовании двойных фамилий у полнородных братьев и сестер. Двойная фамилия ребенка может состоять не более чем из двух слов, соединенных при написании дефисом.

Article 18. Recording a child's surname, first name, and patronymic during state registration of birth

1. During state registration of birth, the surname of the child is recorded according to the surname of his parents. With different surnames of the parents, by agreement of the parents, the child is assigned the surname of the father, the surname of the mother, or a double surname formed by joining the surnames of the father and mother to each other in any sequence, unless otherwise provided by the laws of the constituent entities of the Russian Federation. It is not allowed to change the sequence of joining the surnames of the father and mother to each other when forming double surnames for full brothers and sisters. The double surname of the child may consist of no more than two words, connected when written with a hyphen.

=== Turkey ===
The Turkish civil code previously prohibited women from using their maiden names alongside their new surnames after marriage. In 2014, the Turkish Constitutional Court ruled that this was a violation of a woman's rights, and the law was amended.

=== French Canadian tradition ===
Until the late 19th century, some French Canadian families had a nom-dit tradition. This was a family nickname (literally a 'said name'). The origins of the noms-dits were various. Some noms-dits were the war-name of the first settler, while he was a soldier: Hébert dit Jolicœur ('pretty heart', compare 'Braveheart'), Thomas dit Tranchemontagne ('mountain chopper'). Some denoted the place of origin of the first settler: Langevin (Anjou), Barbeau dit Poitevin (Poitou). Others denoted a characteristic of the person or of his dwelling: Lacourse ('the run'), Lépine ('the thorn'), Larivière ('the river').

In Canada adding matronymics to create double-barrelled surnames is permitted, such as the example of Yannick Nézet-Séguin, who chose to add his mother's name when he was in his teens in order to distinguish himself as an artist.

=== China ===
Most Chinese surnames are a single character. However, in modern times, some families have combined the surnames of both parents to create new names. Some examples of double-barrelled surnames include the Changchien (張簡) clan in Taiwan, being a combination of the surnames Zhang and Jian. This practice is different from having a Chinese compound surname, where more than one character is used in a surname.

In 2007, Chinese officials suggested that parents should be encouraged to create two-syllable (two-character) surnames for their children by combining their parents' (one-syllable) surnames; this could make people's names more unique and "could help solve the problem of widely recurring names".

=== Nigeria ===
In Nigeria, a double-barrelled surname is adopted when an aristocratic woman marries a lower-ranked man. It also occurs when a ruling family adopts the forename of their patriarch as part of their surname to distinguish themselves from others who might share their surname. An example of the former is that of the Vaughan-Richards family, a group of descendants of the Nigerian royal-turned-American-emancipated-slave Prince Scipio Vaughan, who maintain their mother Ayo's last name as well as their father Alan's (at the time of the marriage, the Vaughan family awarded the couple land in Lagos as a wedding gift). An example of the latter is that of the royal family of King Adeniji Adele of Lagos, who are distinguished from their numerous Adele cousins by the use of the double-barrelled name "Adeniji-Adele" (which ties them to the era of his reign).

=== Philippines ===
The Filipino naming tradition is derived from the Hispanic system but was influenced by the American (Anglo-Saxon) naming tradition when the Philippines became a United States colony in 1901. A child will customarily carry the mother's original/birth name as the middle name and carry the father's surname. When a woman marries, she keeps her original/birth surname and adds the husband's surname, but does not typically hyphenate it. So, when Maria Santos Aguon marries José Lujan Castro, her name becomes Maria Aguon Castro, and their children will typically carry the middle name Aguon and the surname Castro.

The use of the maternal surname as a middle name derives from American influence, with Filipinos adopting English naming customs, when they once used Spanish naming customs, which use two surnames (paternal and maternal) joined with the particle y (or e before /i/). This still remains in use but is restricted to formal purposes, police records, and legal proceedings. In the original Spanish naming system, the middle name corresponds to the paternal surname, not the maternal one. In the Philippines, this middle name (or the maternal surname) is often abbreviated to a middle initial. Thus, a person with the full name Juan Santos Macaraig may become Juan S. Macaraig, whereas according to the Spanish naming system, they would be Juan Macaraig y Santos.

However, the maternal surname may not always be the middle name. In some cases, a second given name may be abbreviated instead, as is the case for Jose P. Laurel.

== Recent developments ==
Since the late 20th century, increasingly permissive legislation on the inheritance of surnames in Western countries has led to the emergence of non-traditional or ad hoc combined surnames. For example, Hispanic American politician Antonio Villar and his wife Corina Raigosa adopted the "blended" surname Villaraigosa upon their marriage in 1987.

In Belgium and Germany, member states of the European Union, courts have refused to register children under the surname given according to a foreign naming tradition.

In France, a practice abolished in 2010 was to use two consecutive hyphens (--) (not the same as a "long hyphen" or dash, nor as a double hyphen) to distinguish between recently formed double surnames and ancient hyphenated family names (French: nom composé). The use of double surnames is legal but not customary. Children traditionally take on their father's surname (or, more recently, optionally their mother's).

In Canada, especially Quebec, it is common for children born since the 1970s to bear both parents' surnames, with no established rules as to whether the father's or mother's name should come first. (In Quebec, under the provisions of the Civil Code enacted in 1980, both spouses must retain their original surnames upon marriage.) This situation was frequent enough that naming laws had to be amended in the early 1990s, when those with double surnames began to marry and wished to give their children double surnames. In such cases, any combination involving at most two elements of the father's or the mother's surname is permitted.

In Italy, a 2016 court ruling held that the previous law, under which children automatically took their father's surname as long as the parents were married or the father recognised the child, was discriminatory; the government therefore clarified that the mother's surname could also be added if both parents so desired, providing that it followed the father's surname. A further court case in 2022 found that this latter requirement was also discriminatory. Consequently, parents have since been able to give their children one or both of their surnames, in any order.

Finland liberalised their name law in 2017, allowing double surnames in some cases, either hyphenated or as such. A double name can be formed when marrying or having children, combining the surnames of the parents. Double names can be combined by taking one part of each. Either spouse or both can take a double name. Based on a family's foreign name tradition, children can also get surnames based on a grandparent's surname. The former law, from 1985, allowed either taking a spouse's surname and optionally continuing using one's own surname as a hyphen-joined prefix, but formally, a person did not get a double surname, and their children got the spouse's surname.

With the rise of same-sex marriage, many same-sex couples have hyphenated each other's names upon marriage. For instance, American attorney and former chair of the Libertarian National Committee Joe Bishop-Henchman changed his surname from Henchman upon marriage to his husband Ethan Bishop, who also changed his surname to Bishop-Henchman at that time.

== See also ==
- Bilingual tautological names
- Double name
- Dual naming
- Name blending
- List of double placenames
