= Remi Vaughan-Richards =

Nigerian film director

- Born: Nigeria
- Education: Kingston University
- Occupation: Filmmaker
- Notable work: Judge Dredd

Remi Vaughan-Richards is a Nigerian filmmaker.

== Early life and education ==
Remi was born in Nigeria, one of four children born to British architect Alan Richards (1925-1989) and Ayo Vaughan (1928-1993), a nurse educator who created the Lagos State School of Nursing. Ayo was from a prominent Lagos family whose patriarch was the 19th-century American artisan Scipio Vaughan. The family members all used the hyphenated surname Vaughan-Richards. Her maternal great-grandfather is the Lagos aristocrat Taiwo Olowo.

She attended Kingston University and the Royal College of Art in London.

== Career ==
Vaughan-Richards started her filmmaking career in the art department, where she worked on such films as Judge Dredd (1995) and Eyes Wide Shut (1999).

In 2020, Remi Vaughan-Richards completed the documentary “The Lost Legacy of Bida Bikini” which is now permanently on the British Museum website. Remi Vaughan-Richards body of work includes Wetin Dey for the BBC World Service Trust; “Laraba’s World” for MoFilm (UK)/Unilever; One Small Step; “Hidden Treasures” series on the first wave of contemporary Western trained artists in Nigeria. In 2015 Pulse magazine named her as one of "9 Nigerian female movie directors you should know" in the Nollywood film industry.

Vaughan-Richards spent six years making Faaji Agba (2016), a full-length documentary about the history of the music scene in Lagos, as told by older musicians assembled by record store owner Kunle Tejuoso. She is creative director at her production company, Singing Tree Films. Vaughan-Richards's Unspoken was selected to appear at the 6th Annual Africa International Film Festival (AFRIFF) in Lagos, in November 2016. In 2019, Vaughan-Richards was featured in the Polaris catalogue produced by Visual Collaborative, she was interviewed alongside other practitioners from around the world.

== Personal life ==
Vaughan-Richards lives in the house known as the Alan Vaughan-Richards House in Lagos, designed by her father Alan. She has also been active in the preservation of the house and her father's papers, and in historic architecture in Lagos more generally. Her ancestry includes Yoruba, British and Catawba.

== See also ==
- List of Nigerian film producers
