= John W. Rogers Sr. =

American attorney, judge, military officer, & fighter pilot (1918–2014)

- Born: September 3, 1918; Knoxville, Tennessee, U.S.
- Died: January 24, 2014 (aged 95); Chicago, Illinois, U.S.
- Resting place: Oak Woods Cemetery in Chicago
- Occupations: Military officer; fighter pilot; attorney; judge

John W. Rogers Sr. (September 3, 1918 – January 21, 2014) was an American attorney and military aviator. He served as a Cook County, Illinois Juvenile Court judge, attorney, U.S. Army Air Force/U.S. Air Force officer and combat fighter pilot with the 332nd Fighter Group's 99th Pursuit Squadron, best known as the Tuskegee Airmen or "Red Tails". He was one of the 1007 documented Tuskegee Airmen Pilots.

He was the father of John W. Rogers Jr. (born March 31, 1958), an investor.

== Early life ==
He was born in Knoxville, Tennessee on September 3, 1918. In 1922, his mother Ann died when he was 4. In 1930, his father died when he was 12. Soon after, he and his sisters were relocated to Chicago to live with their uncle, Henry Tanner, who proved to be very benevolent and an exceptional role model for him and his sisters.

He attended Tilden Technical High School. In 1941, he earned a bachelor's degree in education from Chicago State University. During this time, he earned a pilot's license through the Civilian Pilot Training Program offered on the South Side of Chicago.

== Military career, Tuskegee airmen ==
After obtaining his pilot license, he enlisted in the U.S. Army Air Corps. On August 5, 1942, he graduated from the Tuskegee Advanced Pilot Cadet program as a member of the fifth-ever Cadet Class Single Engine Section SE-42-G, receiving his wings and commission as a 2nd Lieutenant. He was one of America's first thirty-four African American combat fighter pilots. He was assigned to the 332nd Fighter Group's 99th Fighter Squadron and was one of the original 28 99th Fighter Squadron pilots to be deployed overseas.

During World War II, he flew 120 combat missions throughout the European Theater. Fellow pilots considered him a highly skilled dive bomber pilot.

After the war he left the U.S. Army Air Corps with the rank of Captain.

== Law career ==
Rogers Sr. attended the University of Chicago Law School, graduating in 1948 with a Juris Doctor degree. Though the University of Chicago's admissions office initially rejected him, he returned to the office donning his U.S. Army Air Corps' officer uniform, making an argument that anyone who has served America during the war deserved admittance. The University of Chicago Law School rescinded its rejection, admitting Rogers Sr relied on academic funding provided by the GI Bill.

After graduating from the University of Chicago Law School in 1948, he and his then-wife, attorney Jewel Lafontant, formed their own law firm. In 1974, he joined the law firm Earl L. Neal & Associates (now Neal & Leroy), working there until 1977.

In May 1977, he was appointed a Cook County Associate Judge. Several months later, he was assigned to the Juvenile Division where he served 21 years as a Cook County Juvenile Court Judge. In 1998 he retired from the bench.

== Personal life ==
On his first day at law school at the University of Chicago Law School, he met Jewel Lafontant (born Jewel Carter Stradford), a young woman who would become the first African-American woman to graduate from the University of Chicago Law School and serve under two U.S. presidents. They married in 1946. After graduating from the University of Chicago Law School in 1948, Rogers Sr and Jewel formed their own law firm.

He and Jewel had only one child, John W. Rogers Jr. (born March 31, 1958), an investor, philanthropist and founder of Ariel Capital Management (now Ariel Investments, LLC), founded in 1983.

In 1961, he and Jewel divorced. In 1968, he met fellow University of Chicago graduate Gwendolyn on a blind date. After dating for 33 years, they married in 2001.

He was a longtime resident of Chicago, Illinois's Hyde Park neighborhood.

== Death ==
On January 21, 2014, he died at the University of Chicago Medical Center. His memorial service was held at the Rockefeller Memorial Chapel in Chicago. He was interred at Oak Woods Cemetery in Chicago.

== Legacy ==
- In 2007 the collective group of Tuskegee Airmen, received the Congressional Gold Medal.
- In 2012, the University of Chicago Law School named its Admissions Office after him and his late first wife, Jewel Lafontant.
- In January 2012, President Barack Obama, a friend of his son John W. Rogers Jr., invited him and a group of surviving Tuskegee Airmen to the White House to view the movie Red Tails.
- In 2014, the Illinois House of Representatives filed House Resolution HR0839-LRB098-19210-MST 54362 in honor of him and his enduring legacy.
- In 2016, the City of Chicago renamed section of 57th Street between Stony Island and Cornell Drive on the Chicago's South Side in honor of Rogers Sr.

== See also ==
- List of Tuskegee Airmen Cadet Pilot Graduation Classes
- List of Tuskegee Airmen
- Military history of African Americans
- Dogfights (TV series)
- Executive Order 9981 – 1948 order by President Truman
- The Tuskegee Airmen (movie) – 1995 American television film
