= Elizabeth Abimbola Awoliyi =

Nigerian physician (1910–1971)

Chief Elizabeth Abimbola Awoliyi LRCSI, MRCP, MRCOG, DRCPCH, MBE, OFR
- Awoliyi in the 1940s-50s
- Born: Elizabeth Abimbola Akerele; 11 November 1910; Lagos, Nigeria
- Died: 14 September 1971 (aged 60)
- Citizenship: Nigeria
- Education: Queen's College, Lagos; Trinity College Dublin
- Occupation: Physician
- Known for: First woman to practise medicine in Nigeria; Empowerment of women in Nigeria
- Spouse: S. O. Awoliyi
- Children: 2

Chief Elizabeth Abimbola Awoliyi, MBE, OFR (née Akerele, 11 November 1910 – 14 September 1971) was the first female physician practitioner in Nigeria. She was also the first West African woman to earn a license of Royal Surgeon in Dublin. In 1938, Elizabeth Awoliyi became the second West African woman to qualify as an orthodox-medicine trained physician after Agnes Yewande Savage who graduated from medical school in 1929. She served as the second President of the National Council of Women's Societies of Nigeria from 1964 until her death in 1971.

== Life ==
Elizabeth Abimbola Awoliyi was born in the year 1910, in Lagos, the southwestern part of Nigeria, to an Aguda-origin family and her parents were David Evaristo and Rufina Akerele. The Aguda people are descendants of emancipated Afro-Brazilians and Afro-Cuban returnees who began arriving in Nigeria from 1830 onwards. She commenced her basic education at St. Mary's Catholic School, Lagos from where she proceeded to Queen's College, Lagos. Elizabeth Abimbola Awoliyi earned her medical degree in 1938 from Trinity College Dublin, Cafreys College. She graduated from Dublin with first class honors, including a medal in Medicine and distinction in Anatomy. She became the first West African woman to be awarded a Licentiate of Royal College of Surgeons in Ireland, in Dublin. She was a Member of the Royal College of Physicians (United Kingdom) and the Royal College of Obstetricians and Gynaecologists and a Diplomate of the Royal College of Paediatrics and Child Health.

Awoliyi returned to Nigeria and became a gynaecologist and junior medical officer at the Massey Street Hospital Lagos. She later became a chief consultant and medical director at that hospital, holding the latter position from 1960 through 1969. In 1962, she was appointed as a senior specialist gynaecologist and obstetrician by the Federal Ministry of Health.

Some of her awards are Member of the Most Excellent Order of the British Empire (MBE), Iya Abiye of Lagos, Iyalaje of Oyo Empire, and Nigerian National Honor – Officer of the Order of the Federal Republic (OFR).

The novel Return to Life, by her son Tunji Awoliyi, is dedicated to her.

Awoliyi is included as a "Nigerian Heroine of the 20th Century" in the book Nigerian Heroes and Heroines: and other issues in citizenship education, by Godwin Chukwuemeka Ezeh.

The Dr. Abimbola Awoliyi Memorial Hospital is located in Lagos Island, Lagos, Nigeria.

Awoliyi owned a 27-acre poultry and orange farm in Agege, Lagos, and became director of the commercial medical store in Lagos.

=== NCWS ===
Awoliyi was the pioneer president of the Lagos branch of the National Council of Women's Societies (NCWS) and a member of the national committee of the organization and she contributed to their policies and activities. She negotiated for the gift of a national headquarters located at Tafawa Balewa Square and was a consultant to the organization's family planning clinic which later became the planned parenthood federation of Nigeria. She succeeded Kofo Ademola as the second president of the NCWS in 1964.

=== Leadership and philanthropy ===
- She was the first president of the Holy Cross Parish Women Council at the Holy Cross Cathedral in Lagos
- Motherless Babies Home Governing Council
- Business and Professional Women's Association (president)
- Child Care Voluntary Association (President)
- Lagos Colony Red Cross
- National Council of Women's Societies (Also became the first President of the Lagos branch)

== Personal life ==
Elizabeth Abimbola Awoliyi was married to fellow physician Dr. S. O. Awoliyi and had two children; a son and a daughter. Her husband died in 1965. Dr Elizabeth Abimbola Awoliyi died on 14 September 1971 at the age of 61.

== Awards and honours ==
- Member of the Order of the British Empire (MBE)
- Iya Abiye of Lagos
- Iyalaje of Oyo
- Nigerian National Honor – Officer of the Order of the Federal Republic (OFR)

== See also ==
- Timeline of women in science
- Women in medicine
