= Douglas-Home (surname) =

Douglas-Home is a surname. Notable people with this name include:

- Alec Douglas-Home (1903–1995), British Conservative politician
- Andrew Douglas-Home (born 1950), Scottish former first-class cricketer
- Charles Douglas-Home (disambiguation), several people
- Cospatrick Douglas-Home, 11th Earl of Home (1799–1881), Scottish diplomat and politician
- David Douglas-Home, 15th Earl of Home (1943–2022), British businessman and Conservative politician
- Elizabeth Douglas-Home (1909–1990), the wife of Alec Douglas-Home
- Margaret Douglas-Home (1906–1996), English musician, writer and arts promoter
- Mark Douglas-Home (born 1951), Scottish author and journalist
- Rachel Douglas-Home, 27th Baroness Dacre (1929–2012), English peer
- Robin Douglas-Home (1932–1968), Scottish aristocrat, jazz pianist and author.
- William Douglas-Home (1912–1992), British dramatist and politician
