= Richard Nixon judicial appointment controversies =

Aspect of US presidency

During President Richard Nixon's presidency, federal judicial appointments played a central role. Nixon appointed four individuals to the Supreme Court of the United States in just over five and a half years.

In 1969 President Richard Nixon nominated Warren E. Burger to be the new Chief Justice of the United States after the retirement of Earl Warren. Burger was quickly confirmed. However, when in the same year, he nominated Clement Haynsworth for a vacancy created by the resignation of Abe Fortas, controversy ensued. Haynsworth was rejected by the United States Senate. In 1970 Nixon nominated G. Harrold Carswell, who also was rejected by the Senate. Nixon then nominated Harry Blackmun, who was confirmed.

Nixon was shortly afterward faced with two new vacancies on the high bench due to the retirements of John Marshall Harlan and Hugo Black in 1971.

In spite of the rejections of Haynesworth and Carswell, Nixon announced that he would nominate Hershel Friday and Mildred Lillie to the high bench. Neither was well regarded. Friday was a former member of the American Bar Association House of Delegates; Lillie was then a little-known judge on an intermediate state appellate court in California. After the ABA reported both Friday and Lillie as "unqualified", Nixon nominated Lewis Powell and William H. Rehnquist for the vacancies instead, and both were confirmed.

At the appellate level, Nixon formally nominated one person, Charles A. Bane, for a federal appellate judgeship who was never confirmed. Nixon withdrew Bane's nomination on October 22, 1969 after controversies involving a tax case and allegations of antisemitism. Nixon wound up filling that seat with another nominee. Nixon also considered other appeals court nominees whom he never wound up nominating.

== List of failed appellate nominees ==
- United States Court of Appeals for the Seventh Circuit
  - Illinois seat - Charles A. Bane (judgeship later filled by Nixon nominee John Paul Stevens) (Stevens later was appointed by President Gerald Ford to the Supreme Court of the United States)

== Others who were considered for nomination ==
During Nixon's second term, his administration considered appointing then-Deputy Solicitor General Jewel Lafontant to an unspecified federal appeals court judgeship (likely on the Seventh Circuit in her home city of Chicago). Lafontant would have been the first African-American woman to serve on a federal appeals court. However, the American Bar Association's Committee on Federal Judiciary rated Lafontant as "unqualified," even though she held a J.D. degree from the University of Chicago Law School and had worked in government since 1969. As a result of the "unqualified" rating, the Nixon administration dropped Lafontant from consideration.

== See also ==
- United States federal judge
- Judicial appointment history for United States federal courts
