= Charles Douglas =

Charles, Charlie, or Chuck Douglas may refer to:

== Law and politics ==
- Charles Eurwicke Douglas (1806–1887), English MP
- Charles Douglas (Canadian politician) (1852–1917)
- Charles Mackinnon Douglas (1865–1924), Scottish MP
- Chuck Douglas (born 1942), American politician

== Nobility ==
- Charles Douglas, 2nd Earl of Selkirk (1663–1739), Scottish aristocrat and courtier
- Charles Douglas, 5th Lord Mordington (fl. 1740s), Scottish peer
- Charles Douglas, 3rd Duke of Queensberry (1698–1778), Scottish nobleman
- Charles Douglas, 6th Marquess of Queensberry (1777–1837), Scottish peer

== Others ==
- Sir Charles Douglas, 1st Baronet (1727–1789), British naval officer
- Charles Douglas, 3rd Baron Douglas (1775–1848), English cricketer
- Charles F. Douglas (1833–1904), American architect
- Charlie Douglas (1840–1916), New Zealand explorer and surveyor
- Charles Douglas (British Army officer) (1850–1914)

== See also ==
- Charles Douglass (1910–2003), American inventor
- Charles Henry Douglass (1870–1940), American businessman in Georgia
- Charles Remond Douglass, son of Frederick Douglass
- Charles Douglas-Home (disambiguation)
