= Scipio Vaughan =

African-American artisan and slave (c. 1784–1840)

Omoba Scipio Vaughan
- Born: c. 1784; Owu Kingdom
- Died: 1840; Camden, South Carolina, U.S.
- Occupations: Slave, artisan
- Spouse: Maria Theresa Louisa Matilda Conway (m. 1815)
- Children: 9 (possibly up to 13)
- Family: Vaughan family

Scipio Vaughan (c. 1784–1840) was an African-American artisan and slave who inspired a "back to Africa" movement among some of his offspring to connect with their roots in Africa, specifically the Yoruba of West Africa in the early 19th century.

After gaining his freedom, he spent the latter part of his life in the United States and started the movement with his immediate family members in his final moments. Several generations of Scipio's descendants are dispersed across three continents where they mostly live or lived, except for occasional cousin reunions, which includes people from Nigeria, Sierra Leone, Liberia, Ghana and Tanzania in Africa; Jamaica and Barbados in the Caribbean; the United States and Canada in North America; and the United Kingdom in Europe.

== Early life and career ==
Scipio was born as an Omoba in 1784 in the Owu kingdom of Abeokuta in Yorubaland. He was captured by European trans-Atlantic slave traders in 1805 and taken together with other captured slaves to the Velekete Slave Market in Badagry, one of Nigeria's slave portal, from where he was shipped in a slave ship to America and taken upcountry to Camden, about 30 miles northeast of Columbia, South Carolina to Charleston, South Carolina, United States. There he was sold as a slave to a white master, Wiley Vaughan and brought to live in Camden. As per the prevailing tradition, he took the surname of his master in addition to his given name; Scipio, as Scipio Vaughan. Scipio was so skilled as an ironmonger that he established a reputation in the area as a talented artisan for his work in fashioning iron gates and fences. As a result of his exceptional gifts, his master Wiley Vaughan valued him so much that he granted him his freedom, his tools, and one hundred dollars as stated in his will after his death. In 1827, Scipio Vaughan became a free man and remained one for the rest of his life.

== Marriage and children ==
In 1815, Scipio married Maria Theresa Louisa Matilda Conway. Of Native American descent, she was the second daughter of Bonds Conway. Bonds Conway was born in Virginia, had come to Camden from Virginia as the body servant of his Master Peter Conway. He was also the first free black of Camden and a successful small businessman and land-owner. Scipio Vaughan and Maria Theresa Louisa Matilda Conway bore and raised 9 children; 7 daughters and 2 sons. All were born in South Carolina, namely: Burrell Churchill Vaughan in 1816; Elizabeth Margaret Hall in 1818; Kitty Ann Hammond in 1820; Nancy Carter Vaughan in 1822; Sarah Ann Vaughan in 1825; James Churchill Vaughan in 1828; Harriet Amanda in 1829; Maria Virginia Vaughan in 1832 and Mary Elizabeth Vaughan Mac Laughlin in 1838. By the early 1800s, Conway had become a successful landowner in Camden. One of his properties included a "small Charleston type house," which has been restored to its former state.

== "Back-to-Africa" movement, descendancy, and legacy ==
On his deathbed in 1840, Scipio told his sons to return to his native Yorubaland in Africa. It is most likely that Scipio was determined to reverse the effects of the transAtlantic slave trade, through some members of his immediate family by rebuilding their roots in Africa in order to restore some of their lost dignity, pride, wealth, power and security. To grant their father's last request, James Churchill Vaughan, 24 years old at the time, and his elder brother Burrell Vaughan, enrolled with the American Colonization Society as emigrants to Liberia. They left Camden in 1852 in an attempt to also escape the oppressive laws against coloured men and sailed to Liberia in 1853. There, they started a new life and James Churchill Vaughan soon became prominent.

However, after arriving in Liberia, they did not settle for long. They lived there for two years before accepting an offer of employment to go with Thomas Jefferson Bowen, a Missionary with the Southern Baptist Convention and his wife to Yorubaland in 1855 to spread the Baptist religion. They came to Nigeria in 1854 and arrived in Ijaye to work as builders in 1855. During the brutal Ibadan-Ijaye War, James was taken captive. He escaped, took refuge in Abeokuta and served as a military sharpshooter. After missionaries were driven out of Abeokuta in 1867, he and other Christian refugees resettled in Lagos, where he built a successful hardware business and raised his family. He became part of the Lagos elite, and was a wealthy and prosperous merchant. He also led a revolt against white missionaries, in the 1880s, helping to establish the Ebenezer Baptist Church, the first indigenous and independent church in West Africa in 1888, located at 50a, Campbell Street, Lagos Island.

James also kept in touch with his relatives in America, who were also embroiled in their own separate struggles for survival, prosperity, and dignity in post-Civil War South Carolina and elsewhere. James Churchill Vaughan revisited his South Carolinian home and family before his death in Lagos, Nigeria in 1893. Scipio Vaughan's descendants included several state legislators during the Reconstruction period, politicians, diplomats, entrepreneurs and a high proportion of teachers, doctors and lawyers, among other professionals. Members of the Vaughans of Nigeria and the United States have maintained contact with one another for several decades over the century.

=== Nigerian lineage ===
Vaughan's descendants include the Nigerian nationalist Dr. James C. Vaughan Jr., and Nigerian educationist and royal Kofoworola, Lady Ademola (the wife of Nigeria's aristocratic chief justice, the Rt. Hon. Omoba Sir Adetokunbo Ademola). James Churchill Vaughan's daughter, Aida Arabella Vaughan Moore, married the Hon. Omoba Eric Olawolu Moore, a prominent Lagos lawyer and one-time member of the Nigerian Legislative Council who was educated in England at Monkton Combe School. They had three children: Kofoworola, Lady Ademola and Oloye Oladipo Moore, Q.C. The Oloye was also educated in England at Monkton Combe School and became another of Nigeria's most prominent lawyers. His wife Aduke Moore was legal counsel to Mobil Oil, West Africa, and later went to New York as a Nigerian delegate to the United Nations General Assembly. James Churchill Vaughan Sr.'s first son, James Wilson Vaughan, married Clara Zenobia Allen and had five children, including the famous Lagos medical doctor, activist and founder of the Nigerian Youth Movement, Dr. James Churchhill Vaughan Jr.. James Churchhill Vaughan Jr.'s brother John Richard Oladeinde Vaughan married Remi Taiwo (also a descendant of royalty); they had four children; Apinke Coker, Ayo Vaughan ,Taiwo Vaughan and Dr James Olufemi Vaughan; Ayo Vaughan became a nursing administrator and married a British architect, Alan Richards, with whom she had four children including the filmmaker Remi Vaughan-Richards.

=== American lineage ===
James Churchill Vaughan's sister, Mary Elizabeth Vaughan Mac Laughlin (1838-1863) who remained in the United States, married a Scot named Mac Laughlin. They had one child, Harriet Josephine Mac Laughlin Carter (1856-1917). Harriet Josephine Mac Laughlin had 12 children. Aida Arabella Stradford was Harriet's third child. Arabella Stradford who married Cornelius Francis Stradford, a renowned Chicago attorney and historic activist, was the driving force behind the survival of the family tradition in the United States. Aida Arabella Stradford had three children, Jewel Lafontant-Mankarious, Burrell Carter and Cornelius Francis Jr. Jewel Lafontant-Mankarious (1922-1997) was the first woman to earn a J.D. degree from the University of Chicago Law School. In 1973, U.S. President Nixon also appointed her to be the first woman to hold the post of Deputy Solicitor General in the Justice Department. Jewel's son is the American businessman John W. Rogers Jr., and her cousin was the civic activist Muriel Snowden.

=== Cousin reunions ===
The American Vaughans started the incentive to trace their African heritage and re-unite with the African group of the Vaughan family. The Vaughans first attempt to convene a reunion started in August 1970, when several family members convened a meeting in Pittsburgh and decided to arrange an annual reunion of all their known relatives. They read the research of a deceased family member, Aida Arabella Stradford, a South Carolina school teacher, and studied census figures, family Bible records and other documents. The Nigerian Vaughans and their American relatives stayed in touch through the years after Churchill's death with periodic "Cousin" reunions. Today, the American Vaughans are now a network of more than 3,000 cousins from over 22 states – along with their Nigerian cousins. From the daughters, who remained in the United States, the cousins have traced the eight main family lines - Barnes, Brevard, Bufford, Cauthen, McGriff, Peay, Truesdale and Vaughan.

Prominent lines amongst the Nigerian Vaughans include Vaughan, Coker, Moore and Vaughan-Richards. The Nigerian Vaughans and their American relatives have stayed in touch through the years after James Churchill Vaughan Sr.'s death, and today the Nigerians take part in the periodic "Cousin" reunions in America.
