= Ayo Vaughan-Richards =

Nigerian nurse and educator

Omoba Ayo Vaughan-Richards
- Born: c. 1927; Lagos
- Died: 1993; Lagos
- Occupations: Nurse, educationist, socialite, author
- Spouse: Alan Vaughan-Richards (m. 1959)
- Children: 4
- Family: Vaughan family

Gladys Ayo Vaughan-Richards (née Vaughan, c. 1927 – 1993) was a Nigerian nurse, educationist, socialite and author. As a descendant of the American freedman Scipio Vaughan, she was a member of the prominent Vaughan family of Lagos.

After being educated in Lagos and studying nursing in Edinburgh, Vaughan-Richards returned to Nigeria and established the Lagos State School of Nursing, one of the earliest nursing and general care teaching hospitals in the country. She also later produced cosmetic products, being a notable early Nigerian beauty influencer, before eventually becoming an author with the book Black Is Beautiful.

The wife of the influential British Nigerian architect Alan Vaughan-Richards (who took her surname following their marriage in 1959), she raised a family of four children with him on land in Ikoyi that had been gifted to them as a wedding present by the Vaughan family. Her children would ultimately include the Nigerian filmmaker Remi Vaughan-Richards.

In addition to being descended from Scipio, who was a prince of the Owu Egba, Vaughan-Richards was a member of the Akinsemoyin royal family of Lagos. She was also related to the Lagos aristocrat Chief Taiwo Olowo, who was her grandfather, and the women's rights activist Kofo, Lady Ademola, who was her first cousin once removed.

She died in 1993.
