= Laila Dogonyaro =

Nigerian activist (1944 – 2011)

- Born: 10 December 1944; Garun Gabas, Jigawa State
- Died: 28 April 2011 (aged 66); Kano, Nigeria
- Occupations: Feminist activist, Politician
- Known for: Founder of the Women's Opinion Leaders Forum (WOLF)
- Political party: National Party of Nigeria

Laila Dogonyaro (10 December 1944 – 28 April 2011) was a Nigerian activist who was president of the National Council of Women's Societies from 1993 to 1995. In the early 1970s, she was Secretary of Jam'iyyar Matan Arewa, a women's welfare organization.

== Early years ==
Laila Dogonyaro was born on 10 December 1944 at Garun Gabas, a town in Hadejia District of the then Kano State (now Jigawa State), northern Nigeria. She was born of a Syrian father and Hausa-Fulani mother. Laila attended Saint Louis Primary School, Kano, and got admission into the Ilorin Secondary School but could not further her education due to the Northern culture on girls’ education. She was married at the young age of 13 to Alhaji Ahmed Gusau, an older man who worked for G.B. Ollivant.

== Activism ==
Laila's husband was said to have first introduced her to advocacy issues which her second husband, Ambassador MBG Dogonyaro, fully supported. In 1963, she became a founding member of Jam'iyyar Matan Arewa (JMA), a women's group affiliated with the ruling NPC with a focus on the welfare of poor families in northern Nigerian communities. The organization established schools, WAEC centres and gave support to women's suffrage in the region.

In 1977, Dogonyaro made a foray into politics when she contested an election in the Tudun Wada Constituency in Kaduna State. In 1979, she was a member of the ruling National Party of Nigeria. Having failed to win the election, she continued with her advocacy for women's inclusion. Soon she became more prominent in campaigns on issues concerning children and women. She was associated with a number of feminist movements. Her fight against patriarchy and sexism helped to change the perception about women in northern Nigeria.

From 1985 to 1993, she was the Kaduna State chairperson for the National Council for Women's Societies (NCWS) and became the president of the association in 1993. In 1998, she started her organization, Women's Opinion Leaders Forum (WOLF).

== Honors ==
Laila Dogonyaro was the recipient of many honors and awards, the most prominent being the national title of Officer of the Order of the Niger (OON) which the Federal Government gave her in 2001 in recognition of her activism. Dogonyaro was also conferred with the chieftaincy title of Garkuwar Garki by the Emir of Gumel, Alhaji Ahmed Muhammad Sani and was installed at an elaborate ceremony in January, 1995, making her the first woman in northern Nigeria to be given a traditional title.

== Children ==
Laila Dogonyaro had six children: Mohammed Ahmed, a businessman; Maryam Dogonyaro, Bilkisu Dogonyaro, Amina Dogonyaro; Binta Dogonyaro, a magistrate in Abuja, and Isa Dogonyaro, a staffer of the Economic and financial Crimes Commission (EFCC). Binta, the magistrate, is the founder of the Laila Dogonyaro Islamic Centre (LDIC), Abuja.

== Death ==
Laila Dogonyaro died at the Aminu Kano Teaching Hospital (AKTH) in Kano on Thursday, 28 April 2011, after a brief illness. She was buried in her hometown of Garki in Jigawa State. In a tribute, a former Vice-President, Atiku Abubakar, said, "Hajiya Dogonyaro stood shoulder to shoulder among the nation's illustrious women: Mrs Funmilayo Ransome Kuti, Mrs Eyo Ita and Queen Amina of Zaria, among others". He said that the late activist was an inspiration to many women in Nigeria and that the best way to honour her was for others to keep pace with her passion for women's education and mobilisation for national development.
