= John W. Rogers Jr. =

American investor (born 1958)

John Rogers
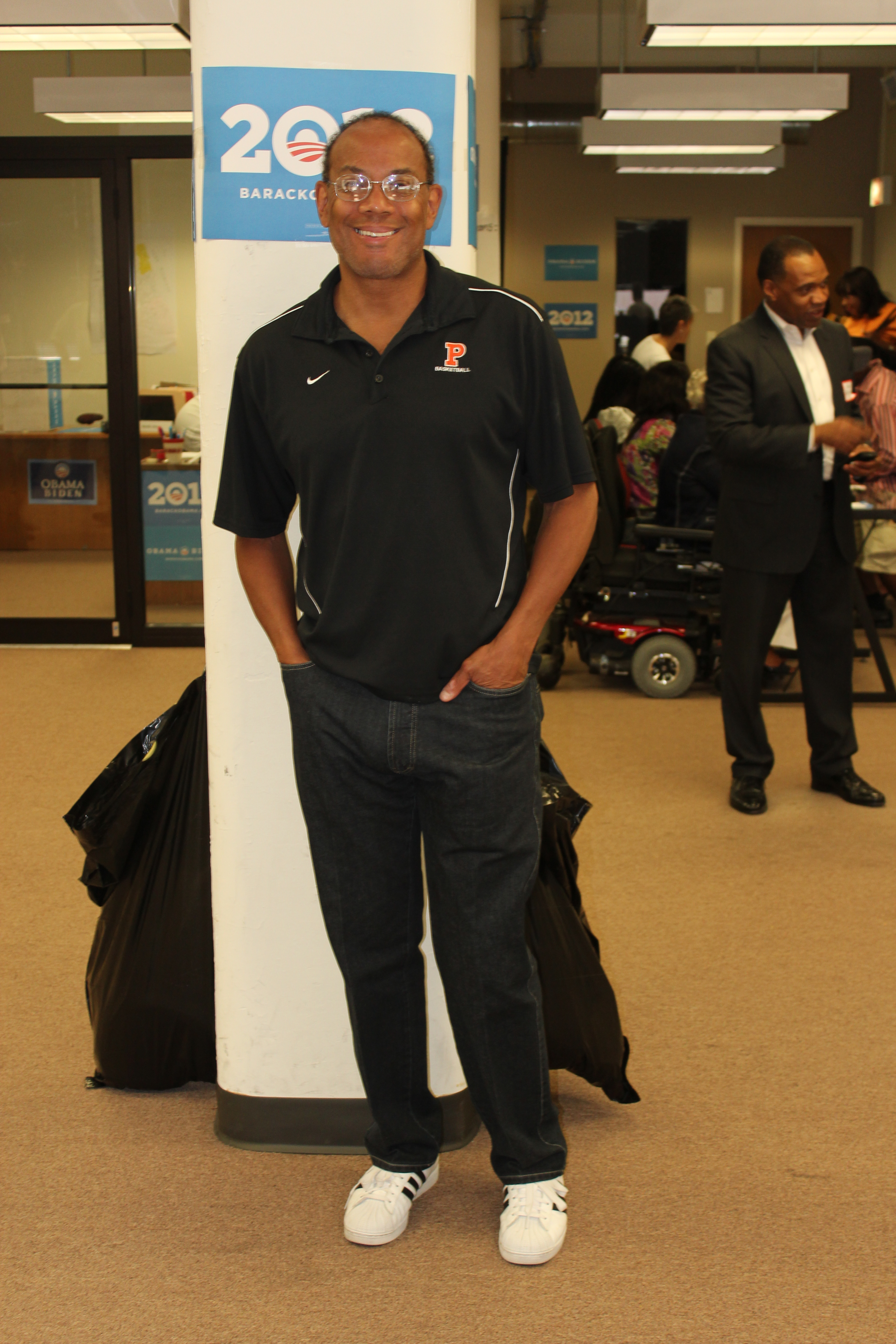

Personal details
- Born: John Washington Rogers Jr. March 31, 1958 (age 68) Chicago, Illinois, U.S.
- Party: Democratic
- Spouse(s): Desirée Rogers (divorced); Sharon Fairley (divorced)
- Children: 1
- Relatives: Jewel Lafontant (mother); John W. Rogers Sr. (father)
- Education: Princeton University (BA)

John Washington Rogers Jr. (born March 31, 1958) is an American investor and founder of Ariel Capital Management (now Ariel Investments, LLC), founded in 1983. He is chairman and co-CEO of the company, which is the United States' largest minority-run mutual fund firm. He has been a regular contributor to Forbes magazine for most of the last decade. Active in the 2008 Barack Obama presidential campaign, Rogers was a leader of the 2009 inauguration committee.

Rogers was appointed the board president of the Chicago Park District for six years in the 1990s. He has also been appointed board member to several companies, as a leader of several organizations affiliated with his collegiate alma mater, and as a leader in youth education in his native Chicago. In 2007, Rogers was honored with the Woodrow Wilson Award from Princeton University for the breadth and depth of his service to many organizations. While a student at Princeton, he was captain of the 1979–80 Ivy League co-champion Princeton Tigers men's basketball team, and in his later life would go on to beat Michael Jordan in a 1-on-1 match, recorded by The Wall Street Journal.

== Early life ==
=== Family ===
He is the only son of Jewel Lafontant and John W. Rogers Sr. His mother was the first African American woman to graduate from the University of Chicago Law School in 1946. She became a prominent Republican lawyer, and she nominated Richard Nixon, who won the Republican Party Presidential Nomination, at the 1960 Republican National Convention. His father was a Tuskegee airman pilot with over 100 combat missions of service during World War II and an eventual Cook County judge for twenty years. His parents divorced in 1961 and his mother died in 1997. Rogers was three years old when his parents divorced.

One of Rogers' great-grandfathers owned the Stratford Hotel in Greenwood, Tulsa, Oklahoma, known as The Black Wall Street. The hotel was destroyed in the Tulsa race massacre. Rogers helped finance Before They Die!, a documentary detailing some survivor accounts, and made a brief appearance in the film. Another of his ancestors is the Yoruba royal-turned-American slave Scipio Vaughan, whose family has had many prominent members over the years.

=== Education ===
Rogers was raised in the Hyde Park community area of Chicago's South Side, and graduated from the University of Chicago Laboratory Schools in 1976. At the age of 12 his father started giving him dividend-paying stocks. He went to college at Princeton University, where he spent time at his local stock brokerage and where he was influenced by Burton Malkiel's A Random Walk Down Wall Street.

He was a college basketball teammate of Craig Robinson, and was captain of the 1979–80 Ivy League co-champion Princeton Tigers men's basketball team. He had a habit of perusing business journals and calling his broker from stadium payphones. Rogers credits Pete Carril, his basketball coach, as his greatest college influence because Carril stressed precision and teamwork.

Rogers studied economics at Princeton. After graduating in 1980, he worked for William Blair & Company in Chicago. A few years later, and with the financial backing of family and friends, he opened his own firm, starting with the Municipal Employees' Annuity & Benefit Fund of Chicago as his first account.

== Career ==
=== Ariel Capital Management ===
Rogers is the founder of Ariel Capital Management. The firm was established in July 1983 with $10,000 in financial support from friends and family. The Ariel fund became public on November 6, 1986. In November 2000, he had 41 employees. In February 2002, the company had 51 employees and more than 120 institutional clients (including United Airlines, ChevronTexaco, and the California State Teachers' Retirement System), which grew to include institutional clients such as Wal-Mart and PepsiCo by April 2005. The company had over 100 employees as of 2008. In 2008, the company changed its name to Ariel Investments, LLC.

Rogers also has served on the boards of directors of other publicly traded Chicago-based corporations, including Exelon, and Bally Total Fitness Corporation, where he was named lead director.

Rogers has been a regular contributor to Forbes for many years and online archives of his commentaries go back as far as 2001. He provides regular personal finance commentaries in a column that has recently been appearing under the title "The Patient Investor".

=== Public service ===
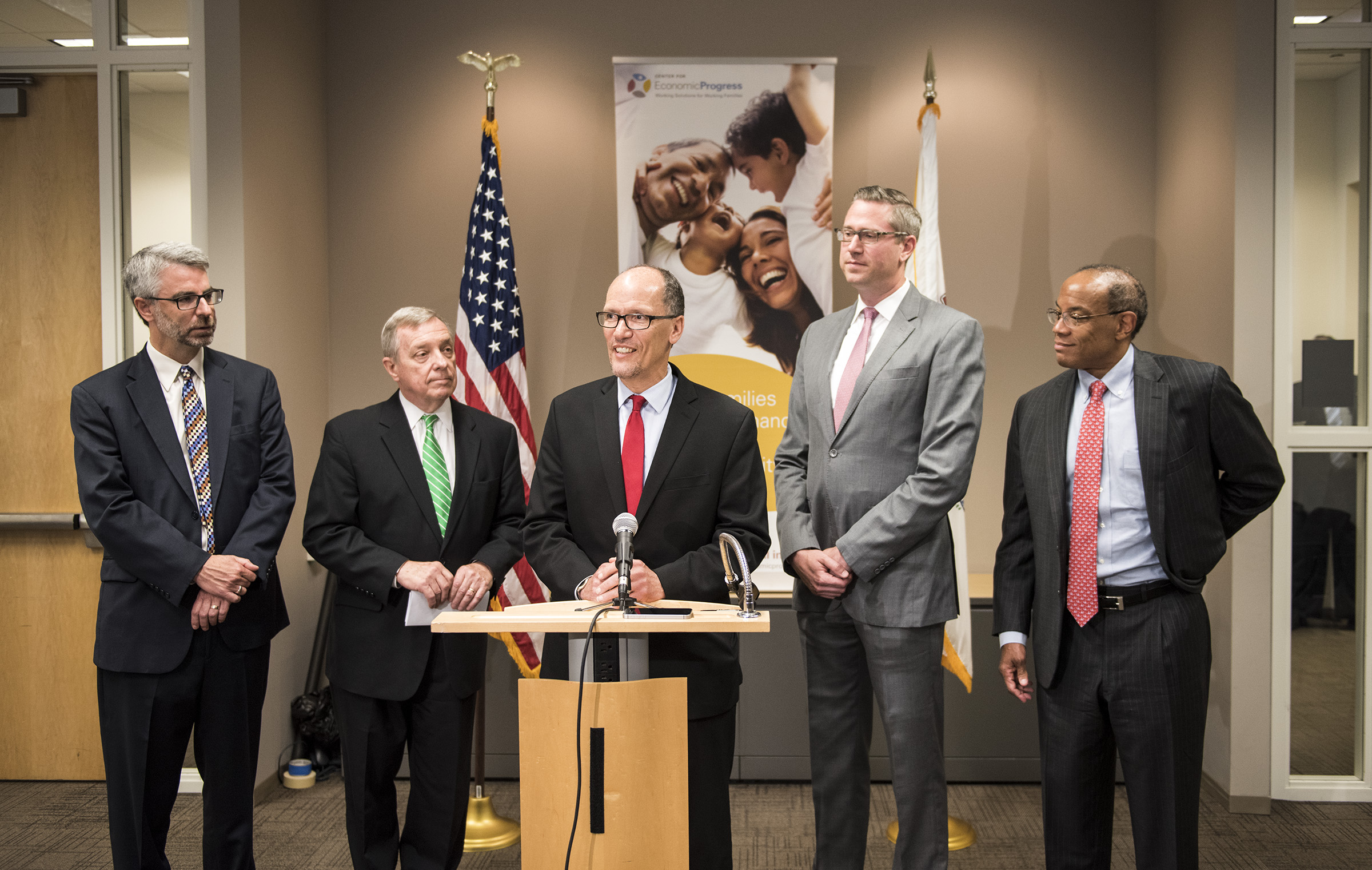
Secretary of Labor Thomas Perez (center) speaks at a press conference at Chicago's Center for Economic Progress. Rogers is on the far right.

On February 23, 2008, Rogers became the first African-American winner of a Woodrow Wilson Award from Princeton University for his service to the Princeton alumni community, the Chicago community, the African American community and the financial community. In 1994, Time featured him as one of its 50 leaders under 40. Rogers is co-chairman of Jesse Jackson's annual Wall Street Project minority conference, chairman of the Chicago Urban League, a member of four corporate boards and was a leading campaigner for Princeton basketball legend and United States Senator Bill Bradley's 2000 United States presidential campaign. Three of the boards he serves on are for Fortune 500 companies: Aon Corporation, Exelon Corporation, McDonald's and in 2018 Nike. He is a trustee of the University of Chicago. He has served numerous civic, educational and arts organizations as a director or trustee, including the Rainbow/PUSH Coalition, and the Chicago Symphony Orchestra. At Princeton, he was a trustee of the university from 1990 to 1994 and more recently has served as a member of the Association of Black Princeton Alumni (ABPA) and the Princeton Varsity Club board of directors, as well as the Alumni Schools Committee. In 1990, Rogers was elected a trustee of Lake Forest College. In the early 1990s, Rogers served as a fundraising leader in Project Vote efforts led by former United States President Barack Obama. He has been an advocate for greater diversity in upper-level corporate positions.

Rogers and his company were part of a network of community partners that supported the Ariel Community Academy, which emphasizes financial literacy in its curriculum. He has designed curricula and brings students to board meetings. As a result of his money and time investment 80% of the eighth-grade graduates from the academy are accepted at elite area high schools. Rogers adopted a class of 40 sixth graders at a cost of $200,000 per year through the "I Have A Dream Foundation". He expected to pay for college for about 30 of the students.

He was part of the inner circle of the Barack Obama presidential campaign. He is a long-time Obama associate who serves as the co-chair of Obama's Illinois finance committee and who has been a major fundraiser for Democratic Party candidates. He served along with Bill Daley, Pat Ryan, Penny Pritzker and Julianna Smoot on Barack Obama 2009 presidential inauguration committee. In June 2009, Rogers became chairman of the University of Chicago Laboratory Schools' board. John left the board in 2016.

=== Honors ===
Since late December 2011, the basketball court in the main competition gym at the University of Chicago Laboratory Schools has been named after Rogers. Rogers graduated from and played basketball at Lab. His name was printed on the floor during Winter Break of the 2011–12 school year, and the court's new title was officially adopted on February 8, 2012, in a ceremony corresponding with Lab's home game against conference rival Northridge Prep.

== Personal life ==
He has a daughter, Victoria, with his former wife Desirée Rogers.

On December 28, 2002, Rogers married Sharon Fairley. At the time of their 2002 wedding announcement in The New York Times, Fairley was the executive director of consumer marketing and trademark development at Pharmacia. Rogers and Fairley later divorced in February 2015.

Rogers beat Michael Jordan in a game of 1-on-1 in Las Vegas in August 2003 at Michael Jordan's Senior Flight School. The camp, attended by affluent businessmen in the early 2000s, had a registration fee of $15,000. The Wall Street Journal posted video in 2008 of a glasses-wearing Rogers driving and scoring on Jordan, winning 3–2 in a game of make-it, take-it after Jordan's last season with the Washington Wizards. The result caused spectator and actor Damon Wayans to tell Jordan in front of the campers, “How do you feel about getting humiliated by a man five years older?".
