= Nogueira Ferrão =

Nogueira Ferrão is a European (Portuguese) double-barrelled surname that derives from the combined surnames of two gentry families from northern Portugal, Nogueira and Ferrão. The literal meaning of these surnames is "Walnut Tree" (Nogueira) and "Stinger" or "Point on a Knight's Round Shield" (Ferrão). Only one family exists with this precise surname; anyone named Nogueira or Ferrão, but not both, may not be related to this family.

== History ==
The surnames of Nogueira and Ferrão were united through the marriage in the cathedral city of Viseu of Dr. José António Ribeiro Nogueira (1716-1764) and Ana Joaquina Bernarda Ferrão Cardoso de Almeida (1723-1793) on February 26, 1743. Both families trace their roots to the city of Viseu, with the Nogueiras having direct lineage to João Nogueira, "o Velho" ("the Older"), who was born on or about 1600 and died on September 12, 1661, and was laid to rest in Massorim, Viseu, whilst direct lineage on the Ferrões can be traced to Maria Ferrão (1655-1710). From there the Nogueira Ferrão family continued to flourish, and research is able to demonstrate direct lineage dating back to around 1600 through to our present day.

The family name Nogueira dates back as early as 1088, before Portugal became an independent country, and historical documents of the period refer to a noble Templar Knight, Dom ("Sir") Mendo Nogueira, who earned his noble title and coat of arms through his brave combat against the Moors during the country's mission to expel the infidels from the County of Portucale (later becoming the Kingdom of Portugal), and other historical documents reflect that his lineage was carried on by a nephew of his. Although no known records exist demonstrating a direct lineage of João Nogueira, the Older, to this knight, it is nonetheless striking that another nobleman, Filipe Nogueira, a direct descendant of the original Nogueiras, bearing the same coat of arms, established himself in Viseu circa 1350, where he was appointed by the Bishop of Viseu as his Archdeacon, a secular, administrative position of paramount political importance.

The noble Nogueira Ferrão family have been landed gentry throughout the past four hundred years during Portugal's monarchic period and its subsequent republican era. During these centuries the Nogueiras Ferrões joined the ranks of the educated classes with its first university graduate, Dr. João Ribeiro Nogueira (1668-1743), Surgeon to the Hospital Real de Todos os Santos in Lisbon, later returning to his native city of Viseu as County Surgeon. His son, José António Ribeiro Nogueira, followed in his footsteps in pursuing higher education and became an attorney-at-law upon completing his education at the University of Coimbra.

It would not be until Major José António Ribeiro Nogueira Ferrão (1790-1830) of the 11th Royal Army Infantry Regiment that a member of this family would take part in world history. Major Nogueira Ferrão joined the Royal Army as a 17-year-old cadet officer at the onset of the Peninsular War (1808-1814), shortly after the first of the three unsuccessful attempts by Napoleon to invade Portugal, and fought in six decisive battles (Roliça, Vimeiro, Buçaco, Albuhera, Salamanca, Vitoria and Pyrenees) and in two major sieges (Ciudad Rodrigo and Badajoz) against the French forces both on his native soil and in Spanish territory.

From that point forward, this gentried family would carry on its tradition by perpetuating its duty and service to the Crown (and later to the Republic) as high-ranking military officers, senior civil servants, literary authors, politicians, university professors, medical doctors, lawyers, engineers, architects and business owners, also to the Roman Catholic Church as members of the clergy. The family's service to their Country has been frequently rewarded by heads of state.

The most noteworthy bearers of the Nogueira Ferrão surname are Captain Carlos Ribeiro Nogueira Ferrão, Colonel António Ribeiro Nogueira Ferrão, João Ribeiro Nogueira Ferrão (Mayor of Viseu) and Major José António Ribeiro Nogueira Ferrão.

Carlos Ribeiro Nogueira Ferrão published in Lisbon Estudos Sobre a Ilha de Santo Antão, Vol 1, Imprensa Nacional (1898), which is one of the first, fully comprehensive geographical books detailing a country's (in this case Cape Verde) geography, topography, climatology, geology, anthropology, wildlife, etc. In addition to finding this publication in some of Europe's libraries and institutes, it also has been housed at the Dwight Eizenhower Presidential Library-Institute and Stanford University in the United States of America.

In modern times the family has moved beyond its Portuguese borders, by having some of its members move to other European countries, the United States of America and Brazil.
