= Kofoworola Ademola =

Nigerian educationist, philanthropist and politician (1913–2002)

Kofoworola, Lady Ademola
- Born: Kofoworola Aina Moore; 21 May 1913; Lagos, Nigeria
- Died: 15 May 2002 (aged 88)
- Education: CMS Girls School, Lagos, Vassar College, St Hugh's College, Oxford University
- Occupations: Educator, writer
- Known for: being the first black African woman graduate of Oxford University, women's education in Nigeria.
- Spouse: Omoba Sir Adetokunbo Ademola (m. 1939; died 1993)
- Children: 5
- Relatives: Oyinkan, Lady Abayomi (cousin); Omoba Ayo Vaughan-Richards (first cousin once removed); Oloori Charlotte Obasa (aunt)

Oloori Kofoworola Aina, Lady Ademola MBE, MFR, OFR (née Moore; 21 May 1913 – 15 May 2002) was a Nigerian educationist. She was a writer and advocate for women's education and president of the National Council of Women's Societies in Nigeria; she was the head of the women's organization from 1958 to 1964. Ademola was the first black African woman to earn a degree from Oxford University, studying at St Hugh's College. She was also an author of children's books.

She was the first president of the National Council of Women's Societies in Nigeria, the first Nigerian graduate teacher in Queen's College, the first female member and later chairperson of the Board of Trustees of the United Bank for Africa, and a member of the Nigerian Scholarship Board.

== Life ==
Kofo Ademola was born on May 21, 1913, to the family of the Lagos lawyer Omoba Eric Olawolu Moore, a member of an Egba royal family who was educated at Lagos Grammar School, Sierra Leone Grammar School and Monkton Combe School in England, and his wife Aida Arabella (née Vaughan), who herself belonged to a family that was descended from Scipio Vaughan (through whom she also had Native American ancestry). She was a first cousin of Oyinkan, Lady Abayomi, a first cousin once removed of Omoba Ayo Vaughan-Richards, and a niece of Oloori Charlotte Obasa. She spent half of her young life in Lagos and the other half in the U.K. Ademola was educated at C.M.S. Girls School, Lagos; Vassar College, New York; and Portway College, Reading. From 1931 to 1935 she studied at St Hugh's College, Oxford, where she earned a degree in education and English. Whilst at St Hugh's she wrote a 21-page autobiography at the insistence of Margery Perham to challenge British stereotypes about Africans, she wrote of her childhood as a mixture of western cultural orientation and African orientation.

She did not report overt racism while in Britain, but expressed annoyance at "being regarded as a 'curio' or some weird specimen of Nature’s product, not as an ordinary human being" and at "ineffectual remarks about our 'amazing cleverness' at being able to speak English and at being able to wear English clothes". Ademola returned to Nigeria in 1935 and took up appointment as a teacher at Queens College. While in Lagos she participated in some women organizations such as YWCA.

In 1939, she married Adetokunbo Ademola, a civil servant. They had five children. As the wife of a Yoruba prince, she was entitled to the style of Oloori—and as the daughter of one, she was herself an Omoba—but because her husband was also a knight, she was best known as Lady Ademola.

Her husband's work took the family to Warri and later to Ibadan, and Ademola established links with the women's organizations in both towns.

An authorized biography of Ademola, Gbemi Rosiji's Portrait of a Pioneer, was published in 1996.

== Career ==
While in Warri with her husband, Ademola was a member of a women's literary circle and a teacher at Warri College. When she moved to Ibadan, she began to cultivate a friendship with Elizabeth Adekogbe of the Council of Nigerian Women and Tanimowo Ogunlesi of the Women's Improvement Society. She was a member of the latter and was a bridge linking both organizations and a few others to form a collective organization. When the National Council of Women Societies was formed in 1958, she was chosen as the first president. As president, she became a board member of the International Council of Women. Ademola was the director of the board of trustees of the United Bank for Africa and secretary of the Western Region Scholarship Board. She co-founded two schools: the Girls Secondary Modern School in Lagos and New Era Girls' Secondary School, Lagos.

Ademola also wrote children's books, many of them based on West African folklore, including Greedy Wife and the Magic Spoon, Ojeje Trader and the Magic Pebbles, Tutu and the Magic Gourds, and Tortoise and the Clever Ant, all part of the "Mudhut Book" series.

== Recognition ==
She was appointed a Member of the Order of the British Empire in 1959, receiving the award from Queen Elizabeth the Queen Mother. Abubakar Tafawa Balewa's government awarded her the honor of membership of the Order of the Federal Republic.

Lady Ademola also held the chieftaincy titles of the Mojibade of Ake and the Lika of Ijemo.

== Sources ==
- Ojewusi, Sola (1996). Speaking for Nigerian women: (a history of the National Council of Women's Societies, Nigeria). Abuja: All State Pub. and Print. Co.
- George, Abosede (2014). Making modern girls: a history of girlhood, labor, and social development in colonial Lagos. Athens: Ohio University Press.
