= Monckton-Arundell =

Monckton-Arundell is a surname. Notable people with the surname include:

- George Monckton-Arundell (disambiguation), multiple people
- Robert Monckton-Arundell, 4th Viscount Galway (1752–1810), British politician
- William Monckton-Arundell, 2nd Viscount Galway (died 1772), British politician
