= National Council of Women's Societies =

- Founded: 1959; 67 years ago
- Type: Non-governmental organization
- Headquarters: Abuja, Nigeria
- Location: Abuja, Nigeria
- President: Princess Edna D D Azura (Kwatam Mutaku)
- Key people: Princess Edna D D Azura (Kwatam Mutaku) (President)
- Website: https://ncwsnigeria.com/

National Council of Women's Societies, also known by its acronym NCWS, is a Nigerian non-governmental and non-partisan women's organization composed of a network of independent women organizations in Nigeria binding together to use NCWS' platform to advocate gender welfare issues to the government and society.

Though criticized by some for its lukewarm opposition and warm reception to government policies, Justice Nzeako, a former NCWS president emphasized that the organization is "apolitical but acts as a pressure group to make the government amend its ways". The organisation works through national, regional and local structures, while engaging government and other stakeholders on issues affecting women and children.

== History ==
The formation of the National Council of Women's Societies (NCWS) was prompted by the large number of women's organizations in the Western region during the nation’s First Republic. The regional minister in charge of social welfare, Oba Akran, called on these organizations to unite and present a common platform in their rapport with governmental and international institutions. In March 1958, members of these women organizations attended a meeting in Ibadan to discuss the establishment of an umbrella organization to unite women in the country. The NCWS was formally inaugurated in 1959 as an organization for women's group in the country.

Key organizations that came together to form NCWS include the Women's Cultural and Philanthropic Organization in Eastern Nigeria, Women's Improvement Society, Women's Movement, Nigerian Women's Union and Federation of Women's Societies. Between 1961 and 1962, the organization established regional branches in Kaduna, Enugu and Lagos.

In the formative years, NCWS was a group of elite women interested in promoting their interest and the interests of less privileged women.

In the early 1960s, NCWS took an active role in promoting initiatives to increase the participation of women in the Economy of Nigeria through training classes and credit programmes. Economic lectures on self-sustenance were delivered by individuals such as Aduke Alakija and other elite women. In the early 1980s, after the crash of oil prices, NCWS organized economic literacy programmes for the market women community.

NCWS goal of affecting national life through active participation of women has led the organization to support women's suffrage in Northern Nigeria during the First Republic. In the late 1950s, it started a voting rights campaign to allow women to vote and be voted for and visited regional leaders such as Ahmadu Bello to press on those interests. The NCWS was also involved in mobilizing women to participate in the political process during the short-lived Third Republic.

=== Affiliates ===
Some organizations that have been affiliated with NCWS are:

- Association of Professional Women Bankers.
- International Federation of Women Lawyers (FIDA).
- Young Women's Christian Association (YCWA).
- Zonta International.
- The Nigerian Guides Association.
- Medical Women's Association.
- Amata Progressive Women's League.
- Ward Women's Vanguard.
- Ibibio Women's Cooperative Societies.
- Muslim Mothers Association.
- National Market Women's Association

== Women's Organisations in Colonial Lagos before NCWS ==
The history of the NCWS is connected to women's voluntary organisations in colonial Lagos, whose work and signficance paved the way for the NCWS. During the colonial period, women had established voluntary organisations to address education, economic and social interests. Among these organisations were the Lagos Ladies League, which was an initiative established under Governor Sir Williams MacGregor in 1901. The League participated in public health campaigns targeted at reducing the infant mortality rate in Lagos, working with medical professionals like Dr Obasa and Dr Cole. Though the League later declined, it re-emerged in the 1920s as the Lagos Women's League and petitioned the colonial government on matters related to children, women and the society.

Other organisations also include the Ladies Progressive Club which organised free literacy classes for women and raised funds for the establishment of Queen's College; and the Nigeria Women's Party, founded by Oyinkansola Abayomi, a staunch woman activist. These organisations provide historical context for NCWS. While the NCWS was founded in Ibadan in 1959, the Lagos branch was founded in 1960 with Oyinkansola Abayomi as its head.

== Goals ==
The goals of NCWS include among others, to improve the welfare, progress and standard of living of women in Nigeria, and to increase the role of women in affecting political life through access to decision making. Other aims include to ensure through legal and political means that women have the opportunity to participate as responsible members of their communities development and growth. In addition, it encourages the affiliation of all women NGO's in the country to come under its platform.

=== Special programs ===
In 1985, NCWS started a Vesico Vaginal Fistula project with assistance from Ford Foundation. The organization is also involved in other educational campaigns including maternal and child health in local governments of the federation and was involved in the establishment of Planned Parenthood Federation of Nigeria. During the 2011 presidential campaign, the government pledged to implement a 35% affirmative action in political appointments for women as part of a promise made to women in the country and NCWS . And then the state (Kebbi) president Haj. Halima Hassan Kamba who was innugurated in 2022 who have being working very well to see the progress and security of women societies in Kebbi state.

== Presidents ==
The following women have led the National Council of Women Societies.

- Kofo Ademola (1958–1964)
- Elizabeth Abimbola Awoliyi (1964–1971)
- Kofoworola Abeni Pratt (1971–1976)
- Ronke Doherty (1976–1980)
- Ifeyinwa Nzeako (1980–1984)
- Hilda Adefarasin (1984–1988)
- Emily Aig-Imoukhuede (1988–1993)
- Laila Dogonyaro (1993–1995)
- Amina Sambo (1995–1997)
- Hajia Zainab Maina(1997-2001)
- Bolere Ketebu (2001-2006)
- Ramatu Usman (2006-2011)
- Nkechi Mba (20011-2016
- Laraba Gloria Shoda (2016-2022)
- Hajia Lami Adamu Lau (2022-2024)
- Acting Geraldine Etuk (June, 2024-Jan, 2025)
- Princess Edna D D Azura (2025-present)

== Criticism ==
During its formative years, NCWS was plagued with conflicts bordering on religious and geographical divisions, state subvention and support of specific government policies such as the austerity programme of President Shehu Shagari's administration and the harassment of street vendors. The issue of financing has earned NCWS criticism from some groups. For a long time, federal and state government gave subventions to NCWS that allowed the organization to build a national headquarters in Abuja and also own a commercial building in Victoria Island, Lagos. This financing relationship have sometimes made NCWS less critical of some actions of the government such as the annulment of the democratic process in 1993 a few years after mobilizing women to come out and participate in the electoral process.

== See also ==
- Women in Nigeria
