= Jewel Lafontant =

American lawyer (1922–1997)

- Lafontant, c. 1972

Personal details
- Born: Jewel Carter Stradford; April 28, 1922 Chicago, Illinois, U.S.
- Died: May 31, 1997 (aged 75) Chicago, Illinois, U.S.
- Party: Republican
- Spouses: John W. Rogers Sr. (m. 1946; div. 1961) Ernest Lafontant (m. 1961; died 1976) Naguib Mankarious (m. 1989)
- Children: John (with Rogers)
- Education: Oberlin College (BA); University of Chicago (JD)

Jewel Stradford Lafontant-Mankarious (April 28, 1922 – May 31, 1997) was the first female (and African American female) deputy solicitor general of the United States, an official in the administration of President George H. W. Bush, and an attorney in Chicago. She also was considered by President Richard Nixon as a Supreme Court nominee.

== Early life and education ==
Born in Chicago as Jewel Carter Stradford, she was the daughter of noted attorney and co-founder of the National Bar Association, C. Francis Stradford, and Aida Arabella Stradford. She was a descendant of the 19th century American artisan, Scipio Vaughan, and his wife, Maria Conway, from whom she acquired Yoruba Nigerian, Native American and Scottish ancestries. Jewel earned a bachelor's degree in political science from Oberlin College in 1943. While at Oberlin College, Jewel was captain of the volleyball team and a member of the Musical Union, Forensic Union, Cosmopolitan Club, and many other activities. Jewel began law school in 1943 and was the only African-American woman in her class. In 1946, she was the first African American woman to graduate from the University of Chicago Law School.

== Professional career ==
In 1947, she was admitted to the Illinois State Bar. The same year, Jewel became a trial lawyer for the Legal Aid Bureau of Chicago, now Legal Aid Society of Metropolitan Family Services. She formed a law firm in Chicago in 1949 with her first husband, John W. Rogers Sr. In 1955, President Dwight Eisenhower appointed Jewel as an assistant U.S. attorney for the Northern District of Illinois. She served in that role until 1958.

In July 1960, she was a delegate to the Republican National Convention. She gave the seconding speech for Nixon's nomination to be the Republican candidate for President during the 1960 Presidential election. In 1961, she started a new law firm in Chicago with her father and second husband called Stradford, Lafontant and Lafontant. In 1963, she argued a case before the Supreme Court of the United States. Her case, Beatrice Lynumn v. The State of Illinois set the precedent for the landmark Miranda v. Arizona case in 1966. She ran unsuccessfully for Illinois judgeships in both 1962 and 1970. Her 1962 campaign saw her run as a Republican nominee in elections to the Superior Court of Cook County. Only a single Republican nominee won any of the seventeen judgeships that were up for election, with the other sixteen being won by Democratic nominees. In 1972, she was a delegate-at-large to the Republican National Convention.

She sat on many corporate and non-profits boards, including the boards of Jewel Companies, Trans World Airlines, Mobil Corporation, Revlon, the Illinois Humane Society, Howard University, Lake Forest College, and Oberlin College.

== Work in the Nixon administration ==
In 1969, Nixon tapped her to serve as vice chairman of the U.S. Advisory Commission on International, Educational and Cultural Affairs. In 1972, Nixon appointed Jewel to serve as a representative to the General Assembly of the United Nations. In 1973, Nixon appointed Jewel to be the first-ever female Deputy Solicitor General. She left the administration in 1975 to return to practicing law in Chicago, which she continued to do until 1989.

== Work in the George H. W. Bush administration ==
She was admitted to the D.C. Court of Appeals in 1985. From 1989 until 1993, Jewel held the title of Ambassador-at-Large and was the U.S. Coordinator for Refugee Affairs while in the administration of President George H. W. Bush. Jewel traveled extensively during this time all over the world. She made a yearly recommendation to President Bush about the number of refugees that should be admitted to the United States. She succeeded Jonathan Moore in this position. After Bush lost his reelection campaign, Jewel returned to Chicago to continue practicing law until her death in 1997.

== Consideration for nomination to the Supreme Court and to an appeals court ==
In his book Witness to Power, John Ehrlichman wrote that Nixon was "intrigued" with the idea of nominating Lafontant to the Supreme Court. Nixon also considered nominating Lafontant to an appeals-court post, but the American Bar Association found her to be unqualified, according to Sheldon Goodman's book Picking Federal Judges, and Nixon dropped the idea.

== Personal life ==
Jewel Stradford married John W. Rogers Sr., a former member of the Tuskegee Airmen during World War II, on December 7, 1946; they had one child, investment executive John W. Rogers Jr. (born 1958). The couple divorced in 1961. She remarried, to Haitian-American attorney H. Ernest Lafontant in 1961, and remained married to him until his death in October 1976. She married Washington-based Egyptian business consultant Naguib Soby Mankarious in 1989 and was married to him until her death in 1997.

She received a Candace Award for Distinguished Service from the National Coalition of 100 Black Women in 1983.

== Death ==
Jewel Stradford Lafontant-Mankarious died of breast cancer at her home in Chicago on May 31, 1997, aged 75.

== See also ==
- Richard Nixon judicial appointment controversies
