= Windsor-Clive =

Windsor-Clive is a surname. Notable people with the surname include:

- Archer Windsor-Clive (1890–1914), English first-class cricketer and British Army officer
- George Windsor-Clive (politician, born 1835) (1835–1918), British Conservative Party politician
- George Windsor-Clive (politician, born 1878) (1878–1968), Conservative Party politician elected as the Member of Parliament for Ludlow between 1923 and 1945
- Harriet Windsor-Clive, 13th Baroness Windsor (1797–1869), British baroness
- Ivor Windsor-Clive, 2nd Earl of Plymouth (1889–1943), English nobleman and Conservative politician
- Other Windsor-Clive, 3rd Earl of Plymouth (1923–2018), British peer
- Robert Windsor-Clive (MP) (1824–1859), British Conservative Party politician
- Robert Windsor-Clive, 1st Earl of Plymouth (1857–1923), British nobleman and Conservative politician known as The Lord Windsor from 1869 to 1905
