= Elizabeth Adekogbe =

Nigerian women's rights activist

Chief Elizabeth Adekogbe

Iyalaje of Ikija

Personal details
- Born: 1919
- Died: 1968 (aged 48–49) Ibadan
- Spouse: L. A. G. Adekogbe
- Education: St Agnes Catholic Training School, Yaba College of Technology
- Alma mater: Yaba College of Technology
- Occupation: Nationalist, Politician, Women's rights leader, traditional aristocrat

Chief Elizabeth Adekogbe (1919–1968) was a Nigerian nationalist, politician, women's rights leader and traditional aristocrat. She was the leader of the Ibadan-based Women's Movement of Nigeria. In 1954, the movement changed its name to Nigerian Council of Women, which in 1959 merged with the Women's Improvement League to form the National Council of Women Societies, a dominant pressure group and a leading women's coalition in Nigeria.

== Biography ==
=== Early life and education ===
Adekogbe was born to a royal family of the Ajaloorun, the king of Ijebu-Ife, in southwestern Nigerian in 1919. She studied at St Agnes Catholic Training School and Yaba College of Technology. She soon joined the civil service and rose to become an Assistant Inspector of Prices during World War II.

=== Political career ===
The Women's Movement was formed in Ibadan in 1952. The group's objectives were universal suffrage, admission of women to Native Authority councils, the nomination of members to the Western House of Assembly, enrollment of more girls in secondary schools, a reduction in the bride price and controls over Syrian and Lebanese trading monopolies. The organization was sometimes aligned with the Action Group. However, few or zero politicians and parties put forth women candidates in federal elections during the period, though women played a major role in electioneering at the time. The women groups were more likely used for gaining votes.

In 1953, a women's conference was convened in Abeokuta. The conference contained all the major women's organizations in the country. A leader of the assembly, Funmilayo Ransome-Kuti, who was favorably disposed towards the National Council of Nigeria and the Cameroons (NCNC), named the congregation the Federation of Nigerian Women's Societies. However, there was a battle of wills among the two prominent women at the assembly: Adekogbe and Kuti. Adekogbe lost, and left the assembly. Later, she supported an alliance with the women's league of the Action Group.

=== Personal life ===
As a chieftain of the Yoruba people to which she belonged, she held the title of the Iyalaje of Ikija.

Her husband, L. A. G. Adekogbe, was a civil servant.

She died in Ibadan in 1968.
