= George Monckton-Arundell =

George Monckton-Arundell may refer to:

- George Monckton-Arundell, 8th Viscount Galway (1882–1943), British politician
- George Monckton-Arundell, 7th Viscount Galway (1844–1931), British Conservative politician and courtier
- George Monckton-Arundell, 6th Viscount Galway (1805–1876), Anglo-Irish Conservative politician
