= Ariel Investments =

American investment company located in Chicago, Illinois

- Genre: Investments
- Founded: 1983
- Founder: John W. Rogers, Jr.
- Headquarters: Chicago, Illinois, United States
- Key people: John W. Rogers, Jr. (founder, chairman, co-CEO and chief investment officer); Mellody Hobson (co-CEO and president)
- AUM: $13.8 billion
- Website: www.arielinvestments.com

Ariel Investments is an investment company located in Chicago, Illinois. It specializes in small and mid-capitalized stocks based in the United States.

== History ==
Ariel was founded as Ariel Capital Management in 1983 by John W. Rogers, Jr., who is chairman, co-CEO and chief investment officer of the company.

Rogers started the firm with a small-cap value mutual fund, called the Ariel Fund. Rogers remains the lead manager on the Ariel Fund. In 2002, Ariel started the mid-cap value-oriented Ariel Appreciation Fund mutual fund, which the firm's then-vice chairman, Eric McKissack, managed until McKissack's departure in 2002. From 2012 until 2025, Rogers was the lead manager on the Ariel Appreciation Fund. Rogers stepped down from the management of that fund as of February 1, 2025.

Longtime Chicago investment banker Charlie Bobrinskoy signed on as Ariel's vice chairman in 2004. Bobrinskoy began managing his own all-cap concentrated mutual fund, the Ariel Focus Fund, in 2005.

In May 2008, the firm rebranded and changed its name from Ariel Capital Management to Ariel Investments.

In August 2008, Ariel laid off 19 employees -- about 20 percent of its staff at the time -- amid what the firm's then-president called a "brutal bear market."

In 2011, Ariel built an all-cap global and international investment team, based in New York City.

In 2021, Ariel launched a private equity subsidiary, Ariel Alternatives, aimed at scaling middle-market, minority-owned businesses, under an initiative called Project Black.

In 2025, Ariel announced the creation of another private equity fund, called Project Level, aimed at women's sports.

On April 14, 2025, Ariel announced that eight employees over the age of 55 had accepted buyout packages to leave the firm, including portfolio manager John Miller, head trader Cheryl Cargie and head of compliance Wendy Fox. Firm officials cited "succession planning" for the move, but a Crain's Chicago Business article covering the announcement highlighted that assets in Ariel's flagship Ariel Fund and the Ariel Appreciation Fund -- by far the firm's two largest domestic investment strategies -- both had declined considerably since 2020.

Mellody Hobson has been president of the company since May 2000. In July 2019, Hobson was appointed co-CEO of the company. As part of that transition, Rogers sold shares in the firm to Hobson to make her the firm's largest shareholder, with Hobson owning 39.5% of the firm and Rogers owning 34.1%, down from his previous stake of 49%. "As many know, I have never been a seller of my Ariel stock and these are the only shares that I ever plan to sell. I am happily doing so to level the playing field," Rogers told Crain's Chicago Business in 2019.

Ariel Investments currently employs 143 people, with the employees and the board owning 95% of the company. The firm has $13.8 billion in assets under management as of 2025.

Ariel is a minority-owned investment company. It claims to be the largest minority-owned investment firm. The company also supports the African-American Community of Bronzeville by giving its support to nonprofits such as The Renaissance Collaborative.

== Ariel Community Academy ==
Through former Chicago Mayor Richard M. Daley’s New School Initiative Program, Ariel Investments was awarded a corporate sponsorship of a Chicago public school in 1996. Hence, the birth of Ariel Community Academy – a public school located on the Southside of Chicago.

== Logo ==
Ariel's logo features the tortoise, which is the symbol of the expression "Slow and steady wins the race," which the firm borrowed from Aesop's fable and expresses through their Active Patience mindset.

== Notable people ==
- Arne Duncan, former United States Secretary of Education, who previously ran the Ariel Education Initiative, which oversaw the creation and operation of the Ariel Community Academy
- Daniel Hynes, former Illinois Comptroller and later a part of Ariel's marketing group
- Kareem Maddox, basketball player and former Ariel intern
- Matthew T. McGuire, former United States executive director of the World Bank Group and earlier a member of Ariel's marketing group
- Jamil Soriano, former New England Patriots player and later, a member of Ariel's research team
- Jason J. Tyler, former chief financial officer, Northern Trust Corporation and prior to that a member of Ariel's research team
- Jason Wright, former Washington Commanders team president and current managing partner and head of investments for Ariel's Project Level fund
- Jitim Young, professional basketball player and former intern at Ariel
