= Alan Vaughan-Richards =

British-Nigerian architect

Alan Vaughan-Richards (1925–1989) was a British-Nigerian architect who was active in the post-colonial architecture industry of Nigeria. He engaged architects on the potential influence of African forms in architectural design through publication of the journal West Africa Builder and Architect.

Vaughan-Richards incorporated the works of Nigerian artists in many of his projects. Trained in modern architecture in England, he then studied cultural uses of architecture in Nigeria, and many of his commissions were hybrids of both influences.

== Education ==
Vaughan-Richards was educated at London Polytechnic (now University of Westminster) where he obtained a diploma in architecture in 1950. He also enrolled for a newly created course on Tropical Architecture at Architectural Association, London in 1956.

== Career ==
Vaughan-Richards began his career in the 1950s working with the Architect Development Board in Iraq and subsequently Architect Co-Partnership in London. The firm was engaged in the design of a newly reconstructed Bristol Hotel and housing for oil and gas companies in Lagos. In the course of the project, Vaughan-Richards was involved in preliminary design and as a site supervisor visited Nigeria during tours of the projects. When Architect Co-Partnership pulled out of Nigeria, Vaughan-Richards stayed in the country and became a Nigerian citizen. His house in Ikoyi close to the Lagos lagoon and which was influenced by forms in Hausa village and designed in a modern style was used as his office. Many of his commissions included private houses and a staff housing facility for University of Lagos. He gained recognition among his private clients with his designs of generous shared or public spaces and broad corridors in his commissions.

American novelist Elaine Neil Orr described Vaughan-Richards' architectural style, writing that he "consistently applied curvilinear geometries in his designs, sometimes as adornment but often as integral elements of walls and rooms. Modular designs were his staple, initially from blocks and roof sheeting, and then from timber framing".

Vaughan-Richards co-founded and edited the West African Builder and Architect to provide information about architecture in Africa and later co-wrote Building Lagos with Kunle Akinsemoyin, a book documenting the development of Lagos.

Vaughan-Richards merged with Felix Ibru's Roye Ibru and Co. He was supervisor of the Architecture department of the University of Lagos where his commissions included Jaja Hall, University of Lagos, University of Lagos master plan; modern designs with tropical and West African forms such as Olaoluwakitan House and Alan Vaughan-Richards house. Many of his works were neglected or poorly maintained.

In the 1980s, he was involved in writing an inventory of Brazilian houses in Lagos for use by a preservation movement. In the 1950s, new construction projects designed from adopted modern European architectural forms with consideration for Nigerian climate and which was led by Maxwell Fry and London trained Nigerian architects began to emerge as the dominant style in Lagos. Vaughan-Richards was among the modernist architect, but he wanted more exploration with the adoption of existing African forms, African art and use of materials such as timber. He was an advocate of incorporating African cultural forms and lifestyles in modern Nigerian architecture, a departure of the orthodox styles emerging in the 1950s that largely incorporated adaptation to the climatic conditions in Africa. His personal house built in the 1960s was an experimentation of traditional West African architectural forms with modern architecture principles such as the use of curvi-linear and circular geometries. Other projects such as the Ola-oluwakitan House stood out for the consideration given to African forms and originality, and later served as a model for other private houses.

== Personal life ==
He married Ayo Vaughan-Richards (née Vaughan), a nurse who was the daughter of a hotelier from the Vaughan family of Lagos. They had four children including the filmmaker Remi Vaughan-Richards.

== Publications ==
- "Le Nigeria" in Rives coloniales : architectures, de Saint-Louis à Douala. 1993. ISBN 2863640569.
- Editor. ''West African Builder and Architect. Journal. 1963 - 1967.
- Co-author. Building Lagos. 1977. Pengrail Ltd
