= Charles Douglas-Home =

Charles Douglas-Home may refer to:

- Charles Douglas-Home, 12th Earl of Home (1834–1918)
- Charles Douglas-Home (journalist) (1937–1985), Scottish journalist
- Charles Douglas-Home, 13th Earl of Home (1873–1951)

== See also ==
- Charles Douglas (disambiguation)
