= Vaughan family =

Nigerian American family

Vaughan
- Parent house: Oodua
- Current region: Nigeria; America
- Origin: Owu Egba
- Founded: 1815; 211 years ago
- Founder: Scipio Vaughan; Maria Theresa Conway
- Connected families: Ademola family Rogers family
- Estate: Camden House

The Vaughan family is a Nigerian American family with branches on both sides of the Atlantic Ocean. In Nigeria, it has links to the Nigerian chieftaincy system and the Nigerian bourgeoisie, while in America, it belongs to the African-American upper class.

== Family history ==
The Vaughans claim descent from the union of Scipio Vaughan, an American freedman of royal Owu Egba origin, and Maria Theresa Conway, who was herself of Catawba descent. On Scipio's deathbed, he told his two sons Burrell Churchill Vaughan and James Churchill Vaughan Sr. to return to his ancestral home in Yorubaland following his death. The pair ultimately did so, and later established the Nigerian branch of the family before their own deaths. The American branch, meanwhile, was itself established by those of their siblings that remained behind.

== Nigerian lineage ==
Vaughan's Nigerian descendants include the nationalist Dr. James C. Vaughan Jr. and Nigerian women's rights activist Kofoworola, Lady Ademola.

== American lineage ==
Vaughan's American descendants include the U.S. government official Jewel Lafontant-Mankarious and her son, the businessman John W. Rogers Jr.

== Today ==
The Vaughan family, while being either Nigerian or American, has provided a large number of doctors, lawyers, businesspeople and politicians over the years of its existence.

The American branch started the incentive to trace its African heritage and re-unite with the African group of Vaughan descendants. Its members first attempt to convene a reunion started in August, 1970, when several Vaughans convened a meeting in Pittsburgh and decided to arrange an annual reunion of all their known relatives. They read the research of a deceased family member, Aida Arabella Stradford, a South Carolina school teacher, and studied census figures, family Bible records and other documents. Today, the American Vaughans are a network of more than 3,000 cousins from over 22 states. From the daughters, who remained in the United States, the cousins have traced the eight main family lines - Barnes, Brevard, Bufford, Cauthen, McGriff, Peay, Truesdale and Vaughan.

The Nigerian branch, for its part, was involved in major events back in the family's homeland: it took part in colonial politics, was active in the women's movement in the Independence era, and intermarried with various Nigerian royal families. Prominent lines amongst the Nigerian Vaughans include Vaughan, Coker, Moore and Vaughan-Richards. The Nigerian Vaughans and their American relatives have stayed in touch through the years after James Churchill Vaughan Sr.'s death, and today the Nigerians take part in the periodic "Cousin" reunions in America.

They may also have descendants in Jamaica.

== Gallery ==
Kofoworola, Lady Ademola, a member of the Nigerian branch

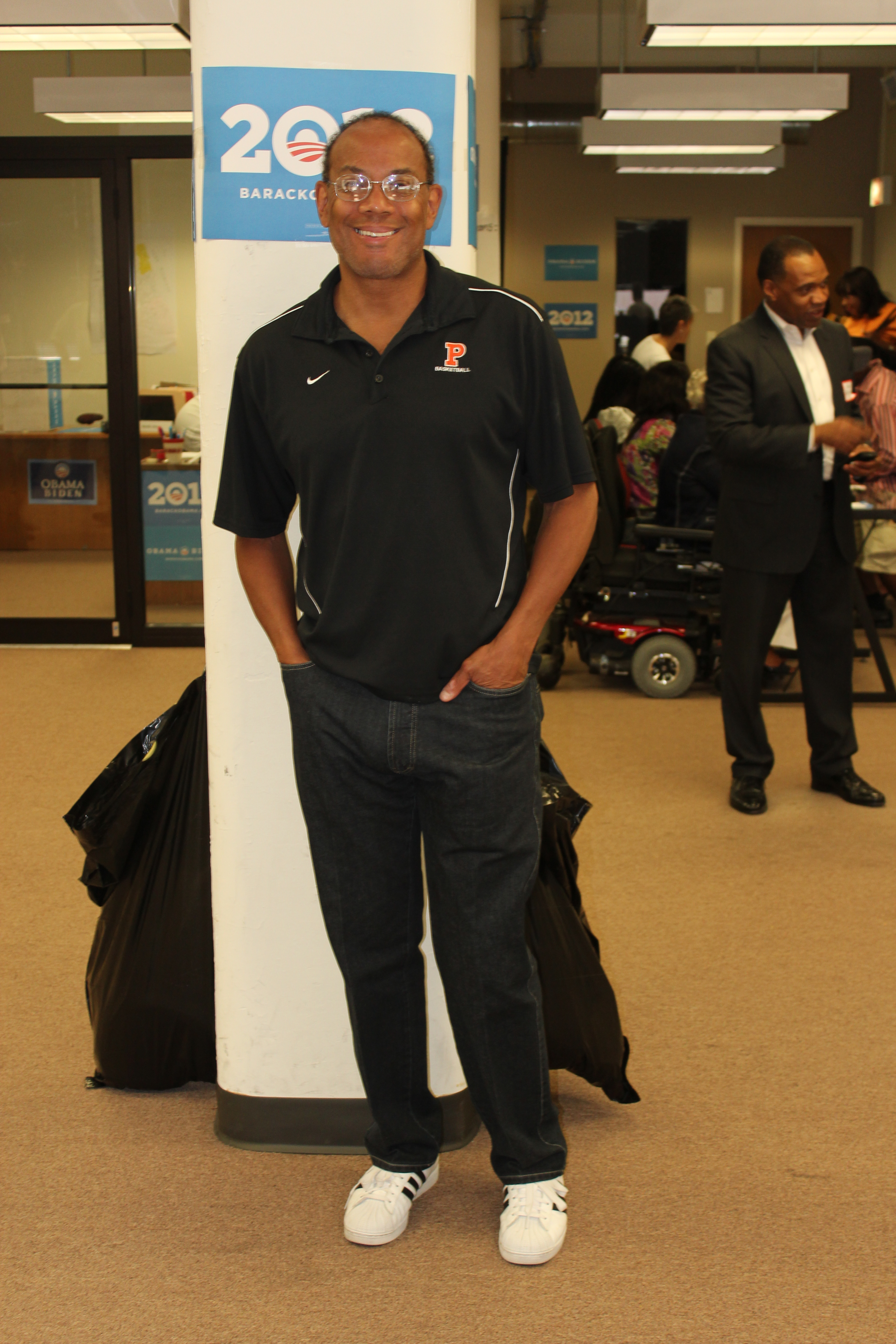
John W. Rogers, Jr., a member of the American branch

== See also ==
- Bustill family
- Cripps–Appiah–Edun family
- Quander family
- Ransome-Kuti family
- Syphax family
